= 2023 Pacific Games opening ceremony =

The opening ceremony of the 2023 Pacific Games took place on Sunday, 19 November 2023, at the Solomon Islands National Stadium in Honiara, Solomon Islands.

== Proceedings ==
=== Parade of nations ===
Order	Nation	Flag bearer(s)	Sport(s)	Ref.
1	American Samoa	Micah Masei	Swimming	
2	Australia	Ryan Tyack	Archery	
3	Cook Islands	Stephen Willis	Football	
3	Cook Islands	Julieanne Westrupp	Touch rugby	
4	Federated States of Micronesia	Tasi Limtiaco	Swimming	
5	Fiji	Taniela Rainibogi	Weightlifting	
6	Guam	Camden Camacho	Tennis	
7	Kiribati	Ruben Katoatau	Weightlifting	
8	Marshall Islands	Mattie Sasser	Weightlifting	
9	Nauru	Maximina Uepa	Weightlifting	
10	Niue	Ramsi Edwards	Weightlifting	
11 |	New Caledonia	Armonie Konhu	Volleyball	
11 |	New Caledonia	Teva Gouriou	Judo	
12	New Zealand	David Liti	Weightlifting	
13	Norfolk Island	Malcolm Tarrant	Chef de Mission	
14	Northern Mariana Islands	Isaiah Aleksenko	Swimming	
15	Palau			
16	Papua New Guinea	Matthew Stubbings	Tennis	
16	Papua New Guinea	Ramona Padio	Football	
17	Samoa	Don Opeloge	Weightlifting	
18	Tahiti	Keha Desbordes	Swimming	
18	Tahiti	Keala Tehahetua	Table tennis	
19	Tokelau	Ilai Ualesi Elekana Manu	Judo	
20	Tonga			
21	Tuvalu	Ioane Hawaii	Table tennis	
22	Vanuatu	Anolyn Lulu	Table tennis	
23	Wallis and Futuna			
24	Solomon Islands	Jenly Tegu Wini	Weightlifting	

== Officials and guests ==
=== Host country dignitaries ===
- Governor-General of Solomon Islands David Vunagi
- Prime Minister of Solomon Islands Manasseh Sogavare and his wife Emmy Sogavare

=== Foreign dignitaries ===
- Australia – Prime Minister of Australia Anthony Albanese
- China – Vice President of the People's Republic of China Han Zheng
- Palau – President of Palau Surangel Whipps Jr.
- Papua New Guinea – Prime Minister of Papua New Guinea James Marape

=== International Organizations ===
- (International Olympic Committee) President of the IOC Thomas Bach
- President of the Oceania National Olympic Committees Robin E. Mitchell
- President of the Pacific Games Council Vidhya Lakhan
- Secretary-General of the United Nations António Guterres

== See also ==
- 2022 Asian Games opening ceremony
