= Australia at the 2023 Pacific Games =

- Flag of Australia
- IOC code: AUS
- National federation: Australian Olympic Committee

19 November 2023 – 2 December 2023
- Competitors: 75 (37 men and 38 women) in 8 sports
- Flag bearer: Ryan Tyack
- Officials: Kenneth Wallace (chef de mission)
- Medals Ranked 3rd: Gold 50 Silver 24 Bronze 10 Total 84

Pacific Games appearances
- 2015; 2019; 2023

Australia competed at the 2023 Pacific Games in Honiara from 19 November to 2 December 2023. This was Australia's third appearance at the games since first appearing in 2015.

The games saw Australia field their largest team ever to the Pacific Games with 75 athletes from eight sports selected.

== Competitors ==
The following is the list of number of competitors in the Games.

Sport	Men	Women	Total
Archery	2	2	4
Athletics	9	9	18
Boxing	7	6	13
Judo	4	4	8
Sailing	4	4	8
Taekwondo	4	4	8
Volleyball	2	2	4
Weightlifting	5	7	13
Total	37	38	75

== Archery ==
The Australian Olympic Committee (AOC) has selected a team of four archers in September 2023. Their selections were based on their performances at the recent 2023 World Archery Championships in Berlin (31 July–6 August) and also domestic and international performances in 2023.

Athlete	Event	Ranking round		Round of 32	Round of 16	Quarterfinals	Semifinals	Final / BM	
Athlete	Event	Score	Seed	Opposition Score	Opposition Score	Opposition Score	Opposition Score	Opposition Score	Rank
Peter Boukouvalas	Men's individual	635	2	bye	Aisik (VAN); W 6–0	Teng (TAH); W 7–1	Winkelstroeter (TAH); W 6–0	Tyack (AUS); L 1–7	2nd place, silver medalist(s)
Ryan Tyack	Men's individual	650	1	bye	Giramur (PLW); W 6–0	Richert (NCL); W 6–0	Giband (NCL); W 6–4	Boukouvalas (AUS); W 7–1	1st place, gold medalist(s)
Sarah Haywood	Women's individual	590	2	bye		Pendu (TAH); W 7–1	Edmundson (NZL); W 6–4	Paeglis (AUS); L 0–6	2nd place, silver medalist(s)
Laura Paeglis	Women's individual	617	1	bye		Tangulu (TGA); W 6–0	David (NCL); W 6–0	Haywood (AUS); W 6–0	1st place, gold medalist(s)
	Mixed team			–	–	–	–	–	3rd place, bronze medalist(s)

== Athletics ==
On 14 September 2023, a 20-member track and field team was announced by the Australian Olympic Committee. The updated roster in October saw the team reduced to 18 (9 men and 9 women).

Key

- Note–Ranks given for track events are within the athlete's heat only
- Q = Qualified for the next round
- q = Qualified for the next round as a fastest loser or, in field events, by position without achieving the qualifying target
- qR = Qualified to the next round by referee judgement
- NR = National record
- N/A = Round not applicable for the event
- Bye = Athlete not required to compete in round

Track and road events
Men

Athlete	Event	Heat		Semifinal		Final	
Athlete	Event	Result	Rank	Result	Rank	Result	Rank
Lachlan Kennedy	100 m	10.34	1 Q	10.53	1 Q	10.49	2nd place, silver medalist(s)
Calab Law	100 m	10.60	1 Q	10.66	3 Q	10.40	1st place, gold medalist(s)
Calab Law	200 m	21.48	1 Q	21.72	1 Q	20.60	1st place, gold medalist(s)
Jack Lunn	800 m	1:53.35	1 Q			1:48.43 GR	1st place, gold medalist(s)
Mitch Lightfoot	110 m hurdles	14.28	1 Q			14.19 GR	1st place, gold medalist(s)

Women

Athlete	Event	Heat		Semifinal		Final	
Athlete	Event	Result	Rank	Result	Rank	Result	Rank
Georgia Harris	100 m	11.85	1 Q	11.82	1 Q	11.70	1st place, gold medalist(s)
Ellie Beer	400 m	55.24	1 Q			52.67	1st place, gold medalist(s)
Imogen Breslin	100 m hurdles	13.97	1 Q			14.21	1st place, gold medalist(s)
Isabella Guthrie	400 m hurdles	59.48	1 Q			57.77	2nd place, silver medalist(s)

Field events
Men

Athlete	Event	Final	
Athlete	Event	Distance	Position
Connor Murphy	Triple jump	16.45m	1st place, gold medalist(s)
Nash Lowis	Javelin throw	74.40m	1st place, gold medalist(s)

Women

Athlete	Event	Preliminaries		Final	
Athlete	Event	Distance	Position	Distance	Position
Samantha Dale	Long jump	6.29m	1 Q	6.42m	1st place, gold medalist(s)
Katie Gunn	Long jump	5.82m	2 Q	6.03m	2nd place, silver medalist(s)
Desleigh Owusu	Triple jump			13.23m	1st place, gold medalist(s)

Combined events – Women's heptathlon

Athlete	Event	100H	HJ	SP	200 m	LJ	JT	800 m	Final	Rank
Mia Scerri	Result	14.54	1.77m				32.15		5624	1st place, gold medalist(s)
Mia Scerri	Points	903	941	774	812	908	517	769	5624	1st place, gold medalist(s)

== Boxing ==
A total of 13 boxers (7 men and 6 women) were selected by the AOC on 4 October 2023. Gold medal winners qualified for the 2024 Summer Olympics.

Men

Athlete	Event	Quarterfinals	Semifinals	Final	
Athlete	Event	Opposition Result	Opposition Result	Opposition Result	Rank
Yusuf Chothia	51 kg	Temakau (KIR); W 5–0	Fauma Keama (PNG); W 5–0	Tetekana (SOL); W 5–0	1st place, gold medalist(s)
Charlie Senior	57 kg	Rounds (TGA); W 5–0	Mukuka (NZL); W 5–0	Oaike (PNG); W 5–0	1st place, gold medalist(s)
Harry Garside	63.5 kg	Ume (PNG); W 5–0	Lele (SOL); W 5–0	Rokobuli (FIJ); W 3–0	1st place, gold medalist(s)
Shannan Davey	71 kg	Toheriri (COK); W 4–1	Lavemaau (TGA); W 5–0	Stanley (NZL); W 5–0	1st place, gold medalist(s)
Callum Peters	80 kg	bye	Saratibau (FIJ); W 5–0	Viney (TGA); W 5–0	1st place, gold medalist(s)
Adrian Paoletti	92 kg	bye	Mathes (NZL); W 5–0	Faoagali (SAM); L 0–5	2nd place, silver medalist(s)
Teremoana Teremoana	+92 kg	Leo (SOL); W 5–0	Maitaka (TGA); W 5–0	Leafa (SAM); W 5–0	1st place, gold medalist(s)

Women

Athlete	Event	Quarterfinals	Semifinals	Final	
Athlete	Event	Opposition Result	Opposition Result	Opposition Result	Rank
Monique Suraci	50 kg	bye		Benny (NZL); W 5–0	1st place, gold medalist(s)
Tiana Echegaray	54 kg	bye	Gillespie (NZL); W 5–0	Tuitupou (TGA); W 5–0	1st place, gold medalist(s)
Tina Rahimi	57 kg	bye	Peters (NZL); W 5–0	Epenisa (TGA); W 5–0	1st place, gold medalist(s)
Tyla McDonald	60 kg	Nansen (SAM); W 5–0	Koputu (SOL); W 5–0	Walsh (NZL); W 4–1	1st place, gold medalist(s)
Marissa Williamson Pohlman	66 kg	bye		Wharerau (NZL); W 4–1	1st place, gold medalist(s)
Caitlin Parker	75 kg	bye	Flint (TGA); W 4–1	Read (NZL); W 5–0	1st place, gold medalist(s)

== Judo ==
The AOC has selected a team of eight judokas (4 men and 4 women) in September 2023.

Athlete	Event	Round of 32	Round of 16	Quarterfinals	Semifinals	Repechage	Final / BM	
Athlete	Event	Opposition Result	Opposition Result	Opposition Result	Opposition Result	Opposition Result	Opposition Result	Rank
Jordon Greenbank	Men's -66 Kg	bye			Taramarcaz (NCL); W 10-00s1		Idmont (NCL); W 10-00s1	1st place, gold medalist(s)
Ryan Koenig	Men's -73 Kg	bye	Sumor (PLW); W 00 Ippon -00	Pandabela (SOL); W 1 Ippon -0	Lafon (TAH); W 01 -0s2		Jaszczyszyn (NCL); W 0 Ippon -0s3	1st place, gold medalist(s)
Carstens Beyers	Men's -81 Kg	bye		Samin (TAH); W 00 Ippon -00	Apavou (NCL); L 00 -00 Ippon		Munuake (NRU); W 00 Ippon -00	3rd place, bronze medalist(s)
Carstens Beyers	Open	bye	Kole (TAH); W 00-00	Apavou (NCL); W 0s20s1-0s10s1	Le Gayic (TAH); W 1s20s2-00s1		Gouriou (NCL); L 00s1-1s20s2	2nd place, silver medalist(s)
Danny Vojnikovich	Open	Jolif (TAH); W 10-00	Gouriou (NCL); L 00-00s1					11
Danny Vojnikovich	Men's -90 Kg			Dowabobo (NRU); W 00 Ippon-00	Neris (NCL); W 1s1-0s1		Le Gayic (TAH); W 1s1-00	1st place, gold medalist(s)
Anneliese Fielder	Women's -48 Kg	bye		Golhen (TAH); W 0s10-00	Tiebwa (KIR); W 00 Ippon -00		Quemener (NCL); W 00 Ippon -00	1st place, gold medalist(s)
Saya Middleton	Women's -70kg	bye		Aguon (PLW); W 10 Ippon -00	Vitielli (TAH); W 10 Ippon -00		Gopea (NCL); W 1s1 -0s2	1st place, gold medalist(s)
Korfoi Biu	Women's +78 Kg	bye					Kofela (SOL); W 10s21 -00	1st place, gold medalist(s)
Saya Middleton	Open	bye	Teumere (TAH); W 0s21 -00	Masae (SOL); W 00 Ippon -00	Gopea (NCL); L 00 -1s1 0s2		Joyce (AUS); W 1s10 -00	3rd place, bronze medalist(s)
Alannah Joyce	Open	bye		Bopp (TAH); L 00 -00s1		Vitielli (TAH); W 00 Ippon -00	Middleton (AUS); L 00 -1s10	5

Women's -78kg

Athlete	Event	Match 1	Match 2	Final / BM
Athlete	Event	Opposition Result	Opposition Result	Rank
Alannah Joyce	Women's -78 Kg	Masae (SOL); W 10 -00	Tengai (SOL); W 10 -00	1st place, gold medalist(s)

== Sailing ==
Eight sailors (4 men and 4 women) were selected by the Australian Olympic Committee on 2 September 2023.

Men

Athlete	Event	Race															Net points + MR	Rank
Athlete	Event	1	2	3	4	5	6	7	8	9	10	11	12	13	14	M*	Net points + MR	Rank
Isaac Schotte	One Person Dinghy (Open)	2	2	2	1	1	2	2	1	1	3	2	3	1	1	6	27	3rd place, bronze medalist(s)
Thomas Farley	One Person Dinghy (Open)	2	2	2	3	2	1	3	2	1	2	2	2	2	2	4	29	4
Jarrod Jones	Heavyweight Sailboard	4	3	3	4	3	4	3	3	4	3	3	4	4	4	3	49	4
Lachlan Vize	Lightweight Sailboard	4	3	2	2	2	2	2	3	3	4	3	3	3	4	2	38	2nd place, silver medalist(s)

Women

Athlete	Event	Race															Net points + MR	Rank
Athlete	Event	1	2	3	4	5	6	7	8	9	10	11	12	13	14	M*	Net points + MR	Rank
Evie Saunders	One Person Dinghy (Open)	1	1	1	1	1	1	2	1	1	2					3	13	1st place, gold medalist(s)
Ellen Sampson	One Person Dinghy (Open)	2	2	2	1	2	2	1	2	2	2					5	21	4
Amelia Wilson	Sailboard	3	3	3	4	3	4	4	3	3	4	3	4	3	4	3	47	3rd place, bronze medalist(s)
Charlotte Wormald	Sailboard	4	4	4	3	5	3	3	3,7	4	3	4	3	4	3	4	49,7	4

== Taekwondo ==
Australia have selected eight athletes into the taekwondo competition at the Games.

Athlete	Event	Quarterfinals	Semifinals	Final / BM	
Athlete	Event	Opposition Result	Opposition Result	Opposition Result	Rank
Ben Camua	Men's −58 kg	bye	Soeunon (NCL); W 2-0	Scotaz (SOL); W 2-0	1st place, gold medalist(s)
Matthew Summerfield	Men's −68 kg	bye	Tapelu (SAM); W 2-0	Scotaz (SOL); W w/o	1st place, gold medalist(s)
Liam Sweeney	Men's −80 kg	Eteuati (SAM); W 2-0	Valente (TAH); W 2-0	Chare (PNG); W 2-0	1st place, gold medalist(s)
Tyrone Staben	Men's +80 kg	bye	Fafale (SOL); W 2-0	Mai Apa (TAH); W 2-0	1st place, gold medalist(s)
Juliet Lahood	Women's −49 kg	bye	Rove (SOL); W 2-0	Huaatua (TAH); W 2-0	1st place, gold medalist(s)
Stacey Hymer	Women's −57 kg	bye	Toves (GUM); W 2-0	Gavin (NCL); W 2-0	1st place, gold medalist(s)
Rebecca Murray	Women's −67 kg	bye	Lisa (SOL); W 2-0	Lolohea (TGA); W 2-0	1st place, gold medalist(s)
Reba Stewart	Women's +67 kg	bye	Soma (PNG); W 2-0	Tepea (TAH); W 2-0	1st place, gold medalist(s)

== Volleyball ==
=== Beach ===
In September 2023, the AOC announced the selection of two Beach Volleyball pairs to represent Australia.

Athlete	Event	Preliminary round				Quarterfinal	Semifinal	Final / GM	
Athlete	Event	Opposition Result	Opposition Result	Opposition Result	Rank	Opposition Result	Opposition Result	Opposition Result	Rank
(Australia) Benjamin Hood (Australia) D'Artagnan Potts	Men's	New Caledonia; Hnassil (NCL); Waneux (NCL); W 2 - 0 (21-9, 23-21)	Wallis and Futuna; Vanai (WLF); Moleana (WLF); W 2 - 0 (21-10, 21-10)	Fiji; Fisher (FIJ); Valentine (FIJ); W 2 - 0 (21-12, 21-16)	1 Q	Vanuatu; Chilia (VAN); Banga (VAN); W 2 - 0 (21-19, 21-19)	Northern Mariana Islands; Johnson (NMI); Mister (NMI); W 2 - 0 (21-11, 21-18)	Tuvalu; Malosa (TUV); Isaac (TUV); W 2 - 1 (19-21, 21-18, 15-12)	1st place, gold medalist(s)
(Australia) Stefanie Fejes (Australia) Jana Milutinovic	Women's	Tahiti; Teikihuavanaka (TAH); Taquaitahuata (TAH); W 2 - 0 (21-16, 21-8)	Samoa; Toleafoa (SAM); Luamanuave (SAM); W 2 - 0 (21-16, 21-9)		1 Q	Tuvalu; Pasefika (TUV); Taimanuga (TUV); W 2 - 0 (21-7, 21-5)	Vanuatu; Lawac (VAN); Toko (VAN); W 2 - 0 (21-13, 24-22)	Solomon Islands; U'una (SOL); Puia (SOL); W 2 - 0 (21-9, 21-10)	1st place, gold medalist(s)

== Weightlifting ==
The Australian Olympic Committee on 1 September 2023, announced a team of 13 weightlifters for the games (6 men and 7 women). In October, a finalized roster of 12 weightlifters was confirmed.

Men

Athlete	Event	Snatch	Rank	Clean & jerk	Rank	Total	Rank
Rory Scott	81 kg	131	2nd place, silver medalist(s)	170	2nd place, silver medalist(s)	301	2nd place, silver medalist(s)
Kyle Bruce	89 kg	146 GR	1st place, gold medalist(s)	184	1st place, gold medalist(s)	330	1st place, gold medalist(s)
Oliver Saxton	89 kg	145	3rd place, bronze medalist(s)	182	2nd place, silver medalist(s)	327	2nd place, silver medalist(s)
Matthew Lydement	109 kg	152	2nd place, silver medalist(s)	181	2nd place, silver medalist(s)	333	2nd place, silver medalist(s)

Women

Athlete	Event	Snatch	Rank	Clean & jerk	Rank	Total	Rank
Kiana Elliott	59 kg	89	2nd place, silver medalist(s)	104	2nd place, silver medalist(s)	193	2nd place, silver medalist(s)
Darcy Kay	64 kg	84	1st place, gold medalist(s)	102	3rd place, bronze medalist(s)	186	2nd place, silver medalist(s)
Brenna Kean	64 kg			108	1st place, gold medalist(s)		
Sarah Cochrane	71 kg	93 GR	1st place, gold medalist(s)	119 GR	(gold) '	212 GR	1st place, gold medalist(s)
Jacqueline Nichele	71 kg	90	2nd place, silver medalist(s)	107	3rd place, bronze medalist(s)	197	3rd place, bronze medalist(s)
Olivia Shelton	76 kg	96 GR	1st place, gold medalist(s)	119 GR	1st place, gold medalist(s)	215 GR	1st place, gold medalist(s)
Eileen Cikamatana	81 kg	115 GR	1st place, gold medalist(s)	145 GR	1st place, gold medalist(s)	260 GR	1st place, gold medalist(s)
