= Boxing at the 2023 Pacific Games =

- Boxing pictogram for the Games
- Venue: Friendship Hall
- Location: Honiara, Solomon Islands
- Dates: 27 November and 2 December 2023

The boxing competitions at the 2023 Pacific Games in Honiara took place from 27 November to 2 December 2023 at the Friendship Hall.

Apart from the Pacific Games boxing tournament, the Olympic qualifying tournament for Oceania was also held for the 2024 Summer Olympics in Paris, France, with the winner of each category gaining a direct quota to the Games. Each tournament was split among 13 events, seven for men and six for women. Only medalists for the Pacific Games boxing competition will have their medals added to the final medal table for the 2023 Pacific Games.

== Medal summary ==
=== Medal table ===
* Host nation (Solomon Islands)

| Rank | Nation | Gold | Silver | Bronze | Total |
|---|---|---|---|---|---|
| 1 | Papua New Guinea | 8 | 3 | 3 | 14 |
| 2 | Tahiti | 2 | 2 | 1 | 5 |
| 3 | Fiji | 1 | 0 | 1 | 2 |
| 4 | Niue | 1 | 0 | 0 | 1 |
| 5 | Solomon Islands* | 0 | 2 | 4 | 6 |
| 6 | Samoa | 0 | 1 | 1 | 2 |
| 7 | Nauru | 0 | 1 | 0 | 1 |
| 8 | New Caledonia | 0 | 0 | 2 | 2 |
| 9 | Tonga | 0 | 0 | 1 | 1 |
| 9 | Vanuatu | 0 | 0 | 1 | 1 |
| Totals (10 entries) | | 12 | 9 | 14 | 35 |

=== Medalists ===
==== Men ====
| Event | Gold | Silver | Bronze |
|---|---|---|---|
| 48 kg | Kantie Oaike; Papua New Guinea | Peto Turua Junior; Papua New Guinea | Ronit Chand; Fiji |
| 48 kg | Kantie Oaike; Papua New Guinea | Peto Turua Junior; Papua New Guinea | Phineus Pitakoe; Solomon Islands |
| 54 kg | Jamie Chang; Papua New Guinea | Marvin Canon; Nauru | Bid Inoino; Papua New Guinea |
| 54 kg | Jamie Chang; Papua New Guinea | Marvin Canon; Nauru | Ricksen Nomleas; Vanuatu |
| 60 kg | Jone Davule; Fiji | Maximillian Makana; Solomon Islands | Ryan Gavin; Solomon Islands |
| 60 kg | Jone Davule; Fiji | Maximillian Makana; Solomon Islands | Herehau Tuieinui; Tahiti |
| 67 kg | Raphael Dauphin; Tahiti | Joshua O'Oku; Solomon Islands | Alai Faauila; Samoa |
| 67 kg | Raphael Dauphin; Tahiti | Joshua O'Oku; Solomon Islands | Fineasi Tuipulotu; Tonga |
| 75 kg | Kendu Steven; Papua New Guinea | Saliuafi Tuautu; Samoa | Tuliki Takatai; New Caledonia |
| 75 kg | Kendu Steven; Papua New Guinea | Saliuafi Tuautu; Samoa | Osward Talaka; Solomon Islands |
| 86 kg | Duken Williams; Niue | Gabriel Dauphin; Tahiti | Arthur Lavalou; Papua New Guinea |
| 86 kg | Duken Williams; Niue | Gabriel Dauphin; Tahiti | Francis Jr. Niusaru; Solomon Islands |

==== Women ====
| Event | Gold | Silver | Bronze |
|---|---|---|---|
| 48 kg | Goli Bali; Papua New Guinea | Not awarded | |
| 52 kg | Grace Sabou; Papua New Guinea | Angelyn Kadiu; Papua New Guinea | Not awarded |
| 63 kg | Petronella Nokenoke; Papua New Guinea | Flore Hani; Tahiti | Laizani Soma; Papua New Guinea |
| 63 kg | Petronella Nokenoke; Papua New Guinea | Flore Hani; Tahiti | Fiona Tuilekutu; New Caledonia |
| 70 kg | Sheila Yama; Papua New Guinea | Leontine Kevin; Papua New Guinea | Not awarded |
| 81 kg | Liranda Kidu; Papua New Guinea | Not awarded | |
| +81 kg | Hereani Temarono; Tahiti | Not awarded | |

== Olympic qualifying tournament ==
A total of 13 athletes (six women and seven men) secured their NOC an Olympic quota for Paris 2024 by winning their weight category. All Oceania National Olympic Committees were eligible to enter one male and one female boxer for each of the 13 events. Australia qualified 12 athletes for Olympics, while Samoa just 1.

Medals won in the Olympic qualifying event will not be added to the 2023 Pacific Games medal table.

=== Medalists ===
==== Men ====
| Event | Gold | Silver | Bronze |
|---|---|---|---|
| Flyweight; 51 kg | Yusuf Chothia; Australia | Clinton Tetekana; Solomon Islands | Charles Keama; Papua New Guinea |
| Flyweight; 51 kg | Yusuf Chothia; Australia | Clinton Tetekana; Solomon Islands | Nehal Chand; Fiji |
| Featherweight; 57 kg | Charlie Senior; Australia | Allan Oaike; Papua New Guinea | Ron Taniveke; Solomon Islands |
| Featherweight; 57 kg | Charlie Senior; Australia | Allan Oaike; Papua New Guinea | Alex Mukuka; New Zealand |
| Light welterweight 63.5 kg | Harry Garside; Australia | Elia Rokobuli; Fiji | Pemberton Lele; Solomon Islands |
| Light welterweight 63.5 kg | Harry Garside; Australia | Elia Rokobuli; Fiji | Kalani Marra; New Zealand |
| Light middleweight 71 kg | Shannan Davey; Australia | Wendell Stanley; New Zealand | Melman Halstead; Nauru |
| Light middleweight 71 kg | Shannan Davey; Australia | Wendell Stanley; New Zealand | Taufa Lavemaau; Tonga |
| Light heavyweight 80 kg | Callum Peters; Australia | Roman Viney; Tonga | Jolando Taala; Samoa |
| Light heavyweight 80 kg | Callum Peters; Australia | Roman Viney; Tonga | Aminiasi Saratibau; Fiji |
| Heavyweight; 92 kg | Ato Plodzicki-Faoagali; Samoa | Adrian Paoletti; Australia | Michael Schuster; Cook Islands |
| Heavyweight; 92 kg | Ato Plodzicki-Faoagali; Samoa | Adrian Paoletti; Australia | Malcolm Mathes; New Zealand |
| Super heavyweight +92 kg | Teremoana Junior; Australia | Elijah Mercury-Leafa; Samoa | Patrick Mailata; New Zealand |
| Super heavyweight +92 kg | Teremoana Junior; Australia | Elijah Mercury-Leafa; Samoa | Amato Mataika; Tonga |

==== Women ====
| Event | Gold | Silver | Bronze |
|---|---|---|---|
| Flyweight; 50 kg | Monique Suraci; Australia | Tasmyn Benny; New Zealand | Constance Abana; Solomon Islands |
| Flyweight; 50 kg | Monique Suraci; Australia | Tasmyn Benny; New Zealand | Only three entrants |
| Bantamweight; 54 kg | Tiana Echegaray; Australia | Hainite Tuitupou; Tonga | Christine Gillespie; New Zealand |
| Bantamweight; 54 kg | Tiana Echegaray; Australia | Hainite Tuitupou; Tonga | Jennifer Chieng; Federated States of Micronesia |
| Featherweight; 57 kg | Tina Rahimi; Australia | Fe'ofa'aki Epenisa; Tonga | Jen Peters; New Zealand |
| Featherweight; 57 kg | Tina Rahimi; Australia | Fe'ofa'aki Epenisa; Tonga | Teretia Toauriri; Kiribati |
| Lightweight; 60 kg | Tyla McDonald; Australia | Erin Walsh; New Zealand | Baby Nansen; Samoa |
| Lightweight; 60 kg | Tyla McDonald; Australia | Erin Walsh; New Zealand | Elizabeth Teaupa; Tonga |
| Welterweight; 66 kg | Marissa Williamson; Australia | Cara Wharerau; New Zealand | Only two entrants |
| Middleweight; 75 kg | Caitlin Parker; Australia | Deanne Read; New Zealand | Eseta Flint; Tonga |
| Middleweight; 75 kg | Caitlin Parker; Australia | Deanne Read; New Zealand | Tilomai Lafaialii; Samoa |

== See also ==
- Boxing at the Pacific Games
- Boxing at the 2024 Summer Olympics
