= American Samoa at the 2023 Pacific Games =

- IOC code: ASA
- National federation: American Samoa National Olympic Committee

19 November 2023 – 2 December 2023
- Competitors: 189 in 11 sports
- Flag bearer: Micah Masei
- Officials: Trevor Kaituu (chef de mission)
- Medals Ranked 21st: Gold 0 Silver 3 Bronze 3 Total 6

Pacific Games appearances
- 1963; 1966; 1969; 1971; 1975; 1979; 1983; 1987; 1991; 1995; 1999; 2003; 2007; 2011; 2015; 2019; 2023

American Samoa competed at the 2023 Pacific Games in Honiara, Solomon Islands from 19 November to 2 December 2023.

== Competitors ==
The following is the list of number of competitors confirmed for the Games.

Sport	Men	Women	Total
Athletics	5	3	8
Basketball	3	0	3
Bodybuilding			
Boxing			
Football	23	23	46
Golf			
Powerlifting			
Rugby sevens	12	12	24
Swimming	2	2	4
Volleyball	16	16	32
Weightlifting	2	0	2
Total	63	56	119

== Athletics ==
American Samoa Track & Field Association will enter eight athletes in track and field.

Key

- Note–Ranks given for track events are within the athlete's heat only
- Q = Qualified for the next round
- q = Qualified for the next round as a fastest loser or, in field events, by position without achieving the qualifying target
- qR = Qualified to the next round by referee judgement
- NR = National record
- N/A = Round not applicable for the event
- Bye = Athlete not required to compete in round

Men

Athlete	Event	Heat		Semifinal		Final	
Athlete	Event	Result	Rank	Result	Rank	Result	Rank
	100 m						
Ailepata Fetuao; Audiescott Iakopo; Mametto Iakopo; Stanley Iakopo	4×100 m relay			—N/a			
Brandon Solaita	High jump			—N/a			
Brandon Solaita	Long Jump			—N/a			
Brandon Solaita	Triple jump			—N/a			

Women

Athlete	Event	Heat		Semifinal		Final	
Athlete	Event	Result	Rank	Result	Rank	Result	Rank
Filomenaleonisa Iakopo	100 m						
Filomenaleonisa Iakopo	200 m						
Lela Waetin	100 m						
Princess Spitzenberg	Javelin throw	—N/a					

== Basketball ==
American Samoa qualified only one team, men's 3x3 basketball team, for the Games based on their FIBA Oceania rankings. The American Samoa women's 5x5 team, who are the defending Pacific Games champions from Apia 2019, failed to qualify for this edition.

=== 3×3 basketball ===
Summary

Team	Event	Pool play						Semifinals	Final / GM	
Team	Event	Opposition Score	Opposition Score	Opposition Score	Opposition Score	Opposition Score	Rank	Opposition Score	Opposition Score	Rank
American Samoa men's	Men's tournament	Papua New Guinea –	Solomon Islands –	Samoa –	New Caledonia –	Marshall Islands –				

==== Men's tournament ====
Team roster

- Esene Desmond Alaia Jr.
- Virgil Lawrence Burton
- Jeremiah Toma Tuimaseve
- Clayton Tini Aputi Lam Yuen

== Weightlifting ==
The ASNOC selected two weightlifters (2 men) for the 2023 Games.

Men

Athlete	Event	Snatch	Rank	Clean & jerk	Rank	Total	Rank
Kennedy Nofoagatoto'a	96 kg						
Martin Folau	109 kg						
