= Northern Mariana Islands at the 2023 Pacific Games =

- IOC code: NMI
- National federation: Northern Marianas Sports Association

19 November 2023 – 2 December 2023
- Officials: Nick Gross (chef de mission)
- Medals Ranked 13th: Gold 5 Silver 1 Bronze 6 Total 12

Pacific Games appearances
- 1979; 1983; 1987; 1991; 1995; 1999; 2003; 2007; 2011; 2015; 2019; 2023

The Northern Mariana Islands competed at the 2023 Pacific Games in Honiara from 19 November to 2 December 2023. This was the Northern Marianas eleventh appearance at the games since first appearing in 1979.

== Competitors ==
The following is the list of number of competitors confirmed for the Games.

Sport	Men	Women	Total
Athletics	4	3	7
Bodybuilding	1	1	2
Football	21	0	21
Golf	6	1	7
Outrigger canoeing	7	9	16
Swimming			15
Tennis	4	0	4
Triathlon			1
Volleyball	2	2	4
Weightlifting			6
Total			

== Athletics ==
CNMI announced a team of 7 athletes in track and field on 20 October 2023.

Key

- Note–Ranks given for track events are within the athlete's heat only
- Q = Qualified for the next round
- q = Qualified for the next round as a fastest loser or, in field events, by position without achieving the qualifying target
- qR = Qualified to the next round by referee judgement
- NR = National record
- N/A = Round not applicable for the event
- Bye = Athlete not required to compete in round

Men

Athlete	Event	Heat		Semifinal		Final	
Athlete	Event	Result	Rank	Result	Rank	Result	Rank
Theodore Rodgers	100 m						
Theodore Rodgers	200 m						
Alexander Camacho	100 m						
Alexander Camacho	Long jump	—N/a					
Pony Tang	1500 m	—N/a					
Pony Tang	5000 m	—N/a					
Pony Tang	3000 m steeplechase	—N/a					
Lyle Andrew	Discus throw	—N/a					
Lyle Andrew	Hammer throw	—N/a					

Women

Athlete	Event	Heat		Semifinal		Final	
Athlete	Event	Result	Rank	Result	Rank	Result	Rank
Casey Cruz	100 m						
Casey Cruz	200 m						
Maria Quitugua	100 m						
Maria Quitugua	Javelin throw	—N/a					
Tania Tan	5000 m	—N/a					
Tania Tan	10000 m	—N/a					
Tania Tan	Half marathon	—N/a					

== Bodybuilding ==
The NMSA selected two bodybuilders (1 male and 1 female) for the Pacific Games bodybuilding competition.

Men

- Davy Laxa

Women

- Christina Tudela

== Football ==
The Northern Marianas fielded both men's and women's football teams with only 15 players each.

Summary

Team	Event	Preliminary round					Final	
Team	Event	Opposition Score	Opposition Score	Opposition Score	Opposition Score	Rank	Opposition Score	Rank
NMI men's	Men's tournament	Fiji	Tahiti	—N/a				

=== Men's tournament ===
Team roster

Head coach: (Japan) Mita Michiteru

Michiteru named his 21-man squad on 13 November 2023.

No.	Pos.	Player	Date of birth (age)	Caps	Goals	Club
	GK	Casey Chambers		0	0	(Northern Mariana Islands Football Association) Kanoa
	GK	Mark Chavez		0	0	(Northern Mariana Islands Football Association) Tan Holdings
	GK	Merrick Toves		0	0	(Northern Mariana Islands Football Association) Kanoa
	DF	Jonne Navarro		0	0	(Northern Mariana Islands Football Association) Tan Holdings
	DF	Nolan Ngewakl		0	0	
	DF	Ronnel Ocanada	26 February 2001 (aged 22)	2	0	(Northern Mariana Islands Football Association) Matansa
	DF	Daniell Mar Pablo	16 January 2005 (aged 18)	1	0	(Northern Mariana Islands Football Association) Kanoa
	DF	Jerald Aquino		0	0	(Philippine Football Federation) Tuloy
	DF	Leland DeLeon Guerrero		0	0	(Northern Mariana Islands Football Association) Kanoa
	MF	Brian Lubao		0	0	
	MF	Ariel Narvaez		0	0	(Northern Mariana Islands Football Association) Eleven Tiger
	MF	Jireh Yobech	8 July 1996 (aged 27)	8	0	(Northern Mariana Islands Football Association) Inter Godfather's
	MF	Markus Toves		0	0	(Northern Mariana Islands Football Association) Kanoa
	MF	Dev Bachani	4 May 2005 (aged 18)	2	0	(United States Soccer Federation) Park–Gilbert Buccaneers
	MF	Anthony Bergancia		0	0	(Northern Mariana Islands Football Association) Tan Holdings
	FW	Mark Costales		0	0	
	FW	Akira Kadokura		0	0	(Northern Mariana Islands Football Association) Tan Holdings
	FW	Wataru Kadokura		0	0	
	FW	Zhi Xiang Lin		0	0	(Northern Mariana Islands Football Association) Eleven Tiger
	FW	Tyler Omelau		0	0	(Northern Mariana Islands Football Association) Tan Holdings
	FW	Anthony Austria		0	0	(Northern Mariana Islands Football Association) Tan Holdings

== Golf ==
On 4 October 2023, following five Pacific Games tryouts for the CNMI national team, 7 golfers (6 male and 1 female) were selected.

Men

- Joseph Camacho
- Ben Jones Jr.
- Marco Peter
- Franco Santos
- Joe Sasamoto
- Kaegel Taitano (alternate)

Women

- Zhi Min Jin

== Outrigger canoeing (Va'a) ==
The Northern Marianas National Paddling Sports Federation (NMNPSF) announced a squad of 16 (7 men and 9 women) as part of their Pacific Games Va'a team.

Men

- Tyler Andrew
- Willie Cabrera
- Yu Ling Chai
- Oliver Igisaiar
- Mitchell Kukkun
- Michael Peters
- Terry Ruben

Women

- Guillerma Chong
- Jenisha Dubrall
- Momoko Halstead
- Sakurako Halstead
- Dayna Macaranas
- Gracie Mendiola
- Vinalynn Oronigo
- Ashley Pangelinan
- Eva Weaver

== Tennis ==
The final 4 men squad for the CNMI was announced in September 2023 following the conclusion of a three-day tryout for the team.

Men

- La Hun Lam
- Colin Ramsey
- Moris Villanueva
- June Yu
