= Rugby sevens at the 2023 Pacific Games =

Sports tournament for multi-sport event

- Rugby 7's pictogram for the Games
- Venue: National Stadium
- Location: Honiara, Solomon Islands
- Dates: 23–25 November 2023

Rugby sevens at the 2023 Pacific Games will be held in Honiara, Solomon Islands from 23 to 25 November 2023. The rugby sevens competition will take place at the Solomon Islands National Stadium. This will be the seventh time that the men's competition will be held, following rugby sevens's debut at the 1999 Games, with women's rugby sevens making its fourth appearance since 2011. A total of thirteen men's and eight women's teams are scheduled to compete (at 12 per team) in each respective tournament.

== Participating nations ==
Thirteen countries and territories have entered teams for the rugby sevens competitions.

- American Samoa (24)
- Cook Islands (24)
- Fiji (24)
- Kiribati (12)
- Nauru (24)
- Papua New Guinea (24)
- Samoa (12)
- Solomon Islands (24) (Host)
- (French Polynesia) Tahiti (12)
- Tonga (24)
- Tuvalu (12)
- Vanuatu (12)
- Wallis and Futuna (24)

== Medal summary ==
Medal table

* Host nation (Solomon Islands)

Rank	Nation	Gold	Silver	Bronze	Total
1	Fiji	2	0	0	2
2	Papua New Guinea	0	1	0	1
2	Samoa	0	1	0	1
4	Tonga	0	0	1	1
4	Wallis and Futuna	0	0	1	1
Totals (5 entries)		2	2	2	6

Medalists

Event	Gold	Silver	Bronze
Men's tournament	Fiji; Rubeni Kabu; Netava Koroisau; Waisea Lawebuka; Iliavi Nasova; Joji Nasova; Iowane Raturaciri; Ropate Rere; Ratu Siqila; Isimeli Tikomaimereke; Jone Tuwai; Alusio Vakadranu; Suliano Volivolituevei	Samoa; Enosa Misitea; Fuli Faafouina; Reupena Filimaua; George Iefata; Pasia Tuifua; Junior Maalo; Tominiko Maiava; Panaua Niulevaea; Daniel Patelesio; Ah Sheck Tafu; Ravuama Seruvakula; Paulo Tuala	Tonga; William Helu; Siaosi Huihui; Gordon Kava; Semisi Maasi; Ngase Ata Maile; Lemisio Moala; Kiunga Ofahulu; Netaleni Taufaeteau; Sione Taufeulungaki; Taniela Tuipulotu; Sione Tupou; Siaosi Vakapuna
Women's tournament	Fiji; Varitema Adi; Mereani Bunawa; Verenaisi Ditavutu; Elesi Leweni; Laisana Likuceva; Mereseini Naidau; Elenoa Naimata; Adi Railumu; Seini Raoma; Lavenia Tinai; Milika Tokaicake; Mereula Torooti	Papua New Guinea; Alice Alois; Marie Biyama; Esther Gigimat; Naomie Kelly; Helen Alo; Janina Nightingale; Cynthiah Peters; Fatima Rama; Gemma Schnaubelt; Barbara Sigere; Magdelene Swaki; Joyce Taravuna	Wallis and Futuna; Malia Fakailo; Marlencka Feleu; Teani Feleu; Nathalie Fiafialoto; Taïna Maka; Filihigoa Maluia; Anemone Mulikihaamea; Emma Receveur; Aneymone Talalua; Eleanore Tialetagi; Rose Fiafialoto

== See also ==
- Rugby sevens at the Pacific Games
