= Field hockey at the 2023 Pacific Games =

- Hockey pictogram for the Games
- Venues: King George Hockey Turf
- Location: Honiara, Solomon Islands
- Dates: 28 November-1 December 2023
- Nations: 6

Field Hockey at the 2023 Pacific Games in Honiara was held on 28 November to 1 December 2023. The hockey5s format was played as it was in 2015.

== Participating teams ==
Six nations are confirmed for the hockey-5s tournament.

- Fiji (18)
- Papua New Guinea (18)
- Samoa (18)
- Solomon Islands (18) (Host)
- Tonga (18)
- Vanuatu (18)

== Medal summary ==
=== Medal table ===
* Host nation (Solomon Islands)

Rank	Nation	Gold	Silver	Bronze	Total
1	Fiji	2	0	0	2
2	Papua New Guinea	0	1	1	2
3	Solomon Islands*	0	1	0	1
4	Vanuatu	0	0	1	1
Totals (4 entries)		2	2	2	6

=== Medalists ===
Event	Gold	Silver	Bronze
Men's	Fiji; Zane Ah Yuk; Cecil Leger; Denzel Mock; Kelvin Ratubuli; Darren-Lee Sawaki; Richard Sekiguchi; Johann Smith; Clapton Underwood; Joseph Vatubua	Papua New Guinea; Jersey Dusty; Lionel Hebei; Chanan Herman; Martin Kanamon; Terence Pomaleu; Henry Pomoso; Trent Pomoso; Ignatius Pou; Andrew Raoma	Vanuatu; John Iawila; Nicholsen Job; Jacklyniho Katawa; John Katmatem; Jossie Lily; Johnson Limus; Nasse Maltungtung; Jeremy Nukur; Francois Simeon
Women's	Fiji; Lora Bukalidi; Elita Burusova; Losalini Dansey; Catherine Fabiano; Magaret King; Divyankar Kumar; Melba Nautu; Lucretia Pickering; Lala Ravatu	Solomon Islands; Gwen Bale; Miriam Bobby; Olivia Ghailobo; Everlyn Hathera; Angela Maena; Lovelyn Maeoli; Evina Roger; Alice Samo; Donasiana Talise	Papua New Guinea; Danielle Bon; Georgina Bon; Ruby kisapai Vanessa Perry; Tricia Pomaleu; Rachael Rabbie; Sullyanne Sissi; Nikita Terence; Monica Wadi

== See also ==
- Field hockey at the Pacific Games
