= Sailing at the 2023 Pacific Games =

Sailing competition

- Sailing pictogram for the Games
- Venue: DC Park
- Location: Honiara, Solomon Islands
- Dates: 20 November–2 December 2023
- Competitors: 38 from 7 nations

Sailing at the 2023 Pacific Games was held in the Solomon Islands from 20 November–2 December at DC Park, Honiara. The competition schedule included men's, women's and team events. The equipment classes used were the Laser and Laser Radial dinghies, plus the windsurfer LT.

== Participating nations ==
Seven nations competed in sailing at the Games.

- Australia (8)
- Fiji (6)
- New Caledonia (6)
- Samoa (4)
- Solomon Islands (7) (Host)
- Tahiti (5)
- Wallis and Futuna (2)

== Medal summary ==
=== Medal table ===
* Host nation (Solomon Islands)

Sailing medal table
Rank	Nation	Gold	Silver	Bronze	Total
1	New Caledonia	7	1	0	8
2	Australia	2	3	3	8
3	Fiji	0	2	2	4
4	Tahiti	0	2	0	2
5	Samoa	0	1	3	4
Totals (5 entries)		9	9	8	26

=== Medalists ===
==== Men's events ====
Event	Gold	Silver	Bronze	Ref
Laser	Étienne Le Pen (NCL)	Eroni Leilua (SAM)	Isaac Schotte (AUS)	
Laser team	New Caledonia (NCL); Étienne Le Pen; Vincent Trinquet	Australia (AUS); Isaac Schotte; Thomas Farley	Samoa (SAM); Eroni Leilua; Vitolio Iamafana	
Sailboard lightweight	Samuel Launay (NCL)	Lachlan Vize (AUS)	Andrew Rhodes (FIJ)	
Sailboard heavyweight	Laurent Cali (NCL)	Teiva Veronique (TAH)	Scott O'Connor (FIJ)	
Sailboard team	New Caledonia (NCL); Samuel Launay; Laurent Cali	Tahiti (TAH); Teiva Veronique; Gilles Le Chevalier De Preville	Australia (AUS); Lachlan Vize; Jarrod Jones	

==== Women's events ====
Event	Gold	Silver	Bronze	Ref
Laser radial	Evie Saunders (AUS)	Sophia Morgan (FIJ)	Vaimooia Ripley (SAM)	
Laser radial team	Australia (AUS); Evie Saunders; Ellen Sampson	Fiji (FIJ); Sophia Morgan; Nelle Leenders	Samoa (SAM); Vaimooia Ripley; Elizabeth Rasch	
Sailboard	Solenn Gourand ép. Calvet (NCL)	Sarah Hebert (NCL)	Amelia Wilson (AUS)	
Sailboard team	New Caledonia (NCL); Solenn Gourand ép. Calvet; Sarah Hebert	Australia (AUS); Amelia Wilson; Charlotte Wormald	(Not awarded)	

== See also ==
- Sailing at the Pacific Games
