= Powerlifting at the 2023 Pacific Games =

2023 Pacific Games event

- Powerlifting pictogram for the Games
- Venue: Maranatha Hall
- Location: Honiara, Solomon Islands
- Dates: 28–30 November

Powerlifting at the 2023 Pacific Games was held on 28–30 November 2023 at the Maranatha Hall in Honiara, Solomon Islands. The competition included eight men's and eight women's weight classes.

== Medal summary ==
=== Medal table ===
* Host nation (Solomon Islands)

Powerlifting medal table
Rank	Nation	Gold	Silver	Bronze	Total
1	Nauru	8	2	0	10
2	Papua New Guinea	2	4	3	9
3	Tahiti	2	1	3	6
4	Samoa	2	0	0	2
5	New Caledonia	1	1	0	2
6	Kiribati	1	0	0	1
7	Solomon Islands*	0	4	3	7
8	American Samoa	0	2	2	4
9	Fiji	0	2	1	3
10	Niue	0	0	1	1
Totals (10 entries)		16	16	13	45

=== Men ===
Event	Gold	Silver	Bronze
−59 kg	Blanco Wharton; Nauru	Kalau Andrew; Papua New Guinea	Martin Taitus; Papua New Guinea
−66 kg	Kaiti Tentau; Kiribati	Rocky Ramo; Solomon Islands	Vinesh Chand; Fiji
−74 kg	Brocka Scotty; Nauru	Anderson Mangela; Papua New Guinea	Klensman Fugui; Solomon Islands
−83 kg	Deamo Baguga; Nauru	Marc Lisan; Tahiti	Gurudyal Samuel Singh; Niue
−93 kg	Jesse Roland; Nauru	Axel Raymond; New Caledonia	Manutea Ozoux; Tahiti
−105 kg	Roy Detabene; Nauru	Salacieli Tamanitadruku; Fiji	Matahi Tinorua-Papai; Tahiti
−120 kg	Barassi Bottelanga; Nauru	Kurt Wise; Fiji	Michael Maomaiasi; Solomon Islands
+120 kg	Oliva Kirisome; Samoa	Justin Pedro; American Samoa	John Ioane; American Samoa

=== Women ===
Event	Gold	Silver	Bronze
−47 kg	Juliette Vizier; Tahiti	Naville Benson; Papua New Guinea	Not awarded
−52 kg	Mihi'iti Malateste; Tahiti	Prettyka Menke; Nauru	Not awarded
−57 kg	Samantha Gware; Papua New Guinea	Nei-Tua Hossain; Nauru	Poetea Guehenneuc; Tahiti
−63 kg	Ludivine Breymand; New Caledonia	Lalmah Sifi; Solomon Islands	Dika Igo; Papua New Guinea
−69 kg	Eteline Tiraa; Samoa	Annette Fanagalo; Solomon Islands	Linda Pulsan; Papua New Guinea
−76 kg	Ao Morea; Papua New Guinea	Vicky Maomaiasi; Solomon Islands	Not awarded
−84 kg	Mesha'h Denuga; Nauru	Cecilia Kanawi; Papua New Guinea	Lorraine Babalu; Solomon Islands
+84 kg	Bessie O'Brien; Nauru	Nolita Motu; American Samoa	Marcel McMoore; American Samoa

== Doping ==
In December 2024, the Pacific Games Council confirmed that Nauru's Mahaasin Daoe, original winner of the men's under 66 kg category, had failed his doping test and was stripped of the gold medal. Medals were reallocated respectively.
