= Boukouvalas =

Boukouvalas (Greek: Μπουκουβάλας) is a Greek surname. Notable people with the surname include:

- Ioulietta Boukouvala (born 1983), Greek judoka
- Michalis Boukouvalas (born 1988), Greek footballer
- Peter Boukouvalas (born 1998), Australian archer
