= Sione Tupou =

- Full name: Sione Maile Tupou
- Born: 25 May 1994 (age 32)
- Height: 189 cm (6 ft 2 in)
- Weight: 105 kg (231 lb)

Rugby union career
- Position: Back-row
International career
Years	Team	Apps	(Points)
2023–	Tonga	1	(0)
Medal record
Men's rugby sevens
Representing Tonga
Pacific Games
Bronze medal – third place	2019 Apia	Team competition
Bronze medal – third place	2023 Honiara	Team competition

Sione Maile Tupou (born 25 May 1994) is a Tongan international rugby union player.

A back-row forward, Tupou captains Tonga in rugby sevens. He led the team at the 2022 Rugby World Cup Sevens and 2022 Commonwealth Games, where he was a flag bear for Tonga in the Parade of Nations.

Tupou made his debut for the Tonga XV in a 2023 Test against Canada in Nukuʻalofa.

== See also ==
- List of Tonga national rugby union players
