= Taekwondo at the 2023 Pacific Games =

Karate competition

- Taekwondo pictogram for the Games
- Venue: SIFF Academy
- Location: Honiara, Solomon Islands
- Dates: 28–29 November 2023
- Competitors: 90

Taekwondo at the 2023 Pacific Games was held on 28–29 November, 2023, at the SIFF Academy in Honiara, Solomon Islands.

== Medal summary ==
A total of 64 medals were won by 10 PGA's.

=== Medal table ===
* Host nation (Solomon Islands)

Taekwondo medal table
Rank	Nation	Gold	Silver	Bronze	Total
1	Australia	8	0	0	8
2	French Polynesia	6	3	3	12
3	Guam	2	0	1	3
4	Solomon Islands*	1	5	7	13
5	Papua New Guinea	1	2	8	11
6	Fiji	0	3	3	6
7	Tonga	0	3	2	5
8	Kiribati	0	1	2	3
9	New Caledonia	0	1	1	2
10	Samoa	0	0	1	1
Totals (10 entries)		18	18	28	64

=== Men's Results ===
Event	Gold	Silver	Bronze	Refs
−54 kg	Isaac Myrie (SOL)	Bobby Willie (PNG)	Not awarded	
−58 kg	Benjamin Camua (AUS)	Jarmine Scotaz (SOL)	Mou Paul (PNG)	
−58 kg	Benjamin Camua (AUS)	Jarmine Scotaz (SOL)	Noah Souenon (NCL)	
−63 kg	Leon Ho (GUM)	Shen Lin (FIJ)	Dereq Kassman (PNG)	
−63 kg	Leon Ho (GUM)	Shen Lin (FIJ)	Monovai Maheahea (PYF)	
−68 kg	Matthew Summerfield (AUS)	Nicholas Sulumae (SOL)	Edo Miyaguchi (PYF)	
−68 kg	Matthew Summerfield (AUS)	Nicholas Sulumae (SOL)	Ozwald Tapelu (SAM)	
−74 kg	Rahiti Iorss (PYF)	Uhila Langi (TGA)	Baddeley Ludawane (SOL)	
−74 kg	Rahiti Iorss (PYF)	Uhila Langi (TGA)	Suliano Ieli (FIJ)	
−80 kg	Liam Sweeney (AUS)	Gerard Chare (PNG)	Tivini Valente (PYF)	
−80 kg	Liam Sweeney (AUS)	Gerard Chare (PNG)	Apisai Karuru (FIJ)	
−87 kg	Tyrone Staben (AUS)	Raihau Mai Apa (PYF)	Rojie Fafale (SOL)	
−87 kg	Tyrone Staben (AUS)	Raihau Mai Apa (PYF)	Nakibwae Kanimisu (KIR)	
+87 kg	Manu Huaatua (PYF)	Charlton Lao (SOL)	Vespa John (PNG)	
+87 kg	Manu Huaatua (PYF)	Charlton Lao (SOL)	Vi Ofa Vaiangina (TGA)	
Team	French Polynesia	Solomon Islands	Papua New Guinea	

=== Women's Results ===
Event	Gold	Silver	Bronze	Refs
−46 kg	Yvette Boyama (PNG)	Tanisha Chand (FIJ)	Not awarded	
−49 kg	Juliet Lahood (AUS)	Tiare Huaatua (PYF)	Tenalyn Rove (SOL)	
−49 kg	Juliet Lahood (AUS)	Tiare Huaatua (PYF)	Rose Tona (PNG)	
−53 kg	Tierra-Lynn Chargualaf (GUM)	Erika Maetia (SOL)	Not awarded	
−57 kg	Stacey Hymer (AUS)	Lindsay Gavin (NCL)	Amber Toves (GUM)	
−57 kg	Stacey Hymer (AUS)	Lindsay Gavin (NCL)	Angel Sitapa (TGA)	
−62 kg	Kawehi Iorss (PYF)	Lolohea Naitasi (FIJ)	Cuthberta Kaekae (SOL)	
−62 kg	Kawehi Iorss (PYF)	Lolohea Naitasi (FIJ)	Fiona Johe (PNG)	
−67 kg	Rebecca Murray (AUS)	Pauline Lolohea (TGA)	Stella Lisa (SOL)	
−67 kg	Rebecca Murray (AUS)	Pauline Lolohea (TGA)	Uriamteiti Teakaua (KIR)	
−73 kg	Hiritea Tepea (PYF)	Ketty Ataia (KIR)	Patricia Kulinias (PNG)	
−73 kg	Hiritea Tepea (PYF)	Ketty Ataia (KIR)	Moddie Foufaka (SOL)	
+73 kg	Reba Stewart (AUS)	Hinavai Tepea (PYF)	Enila Soma (PNG)	
+73 kg	Reba Stewart (AUS)	Hinavai Tepea (PYF)	Venice Traill (FIJ)	
Team	French Polynesia	Tonga	Solomon Islands	
