= Marissa Williamson =

Australian boxer (born 2002)

Personal information
- Nationality: Australian
- Born: Marissa Williamson Pohlman; 19 February 2002 (age 24) Geelong, Victoria, Australia
- Height: 1.73 m (5 ft 8 in)
- Weight: Welterweight

Boxing career
- Stance: Orthodox
Medal record
Women's amateur boxing
Representing Australia
Pacific Games
| Gold medal – first place | 2023 Honiara | Welterweight |

Marissa Williamson Pohlman (born 19 February 2002) is an Australian amateur boxer who competes in the welterweight division. She (Note: Williamson uses both she/her and they/them pronouns; this article uses she/her pronouns for consistency.) won a gold medal at the 2023 Pacific Games in Honiara, Solomon Islands, qualifying for the 2024 Summer Olympics. She was the first female Indigenous Australian boxer to compete at an Olympic Games.

On 1 August 2024, Williamson made her Olympic debut in the round of 16 against Hungarian Luca Hámori, losing the bout 5–0. Amidst the Imane Khelif controversy, she called for bans of athletes with failed gender eligibility tests from competing against women.

Williamson was born in Geelong, Victoria. She has stated she has Aboriginal Australian (Ngarrindjeri) ancestry. She identifies as queer.
