= Table tennis at the 2023 Pacific Games =

- Table tennis pictogram for the Games
- Location: Honiara, Solomon Islands
- Dates: 23 – 25 November 2023

Table tennis at the 2023 Pacific Games in Solomon Islands were held on 23 until 25 November 2023. The events took place at the King George VI National High School.

== Medal table ==
* Host nation (Solomon Islands)

Rank	Nation	Gold	Silver	Bronze	Total
1	French Polynesia	7	6	3	16
2	Fiji	2	2	0	4
3	Vanuatu	2	0	2	4
4	Solomon Islands*	1	3	2	6
5	New Caledonia	1	1	2	4
6	New Zealand	0	1	0	1
7	Papua New Guinea	0	0	3	3
Totals (7 entries)		13	13	12	38

== Men's ==
Event	Gold	Silver	Bronze
Singles	Ocean Belrose (TAH)	Hugo Gendron (TAH)	Kenji Hotan (TAH)
Singles Ambulant	Allgower Maruae (TAH)	Rodney Satini (SOL)	Haoda Agari (PNG)
Singles Seated	Vincent Tehei (TAH)	James Goulding (NZL)	Shadrack Timothy (SOL)
Doubles	New Caledonia	Belrose/Hotan (TAH)	Carnet/Gendron (TAH)
Team	French Polynesia	New Caledonia	Papua New Guinea

== Women's ==
Event	Gold	Silver	Bronze
Singles	Priscilla Tommy (VAN)	Keala Tehahetua (TAH)	Kelley Tehahetua (TAH)
Singles Ambulant	Heiava Lamaud (TAH)	Noela Olo (SOL)	Véronique Lussiez (NCL)
Singles Seated	Merewalesi Roden (FIJ)	Akanisi Latu (FIJ)	Andrynor Sale (SOL)
Doubles	Vanuatu	French Polynesia	Vanuatu
Team	French Polynesia	Fiji	Vanuatu

== Mixed ==
Event	Gold	Silver	Bronze
Doubles	Belrose/Tehahetua (TAH)	Hotan/Tehahetua (TAH)	Morisseau/Waneguii (NCL)

== Para ==
Event	Gold	Silver	Bronze
Team male	Solomon Islands	French Polynesia	Papua New Guinea
Team female	Fiji	Solomon Islands	–
