= Teremoana Teremoana =

Australian boxer (born 1998)

Personal information
- Nationality: Australian
- Born: Teremoana Samson Junior Leon Teremoana; 17 February 1998 (age 28) Campbelltown, New South Wales, Australia
- Height: 1.98 m (6 ft 6 in)
- Weight: Heavyweight

Boxing career
- Stance: Orthodox

Boxing record
- Total fights: 13
- Wins: 13
- Win by KO: 13
Medal record
Men's amateur boxing
Representing Australia
Pacific Games
Gold medal – first place	2023 Honiara	Super-heavyweight

Teremoana Samson Junior Leon Teremoana (born 17 February 1998) is an Australian professional boxer. As of October 2026, he is world ranked #15 by the International Boxing Federation (IBF) in the heavyweight division.

== Early life ==
Teremoana was born in Campbelltown, a suburb of Sydney, New South Wales and moved to Brisbane, Queensland at six months of age where he was raised for the remainder of his childhood. His Australian mother has Scottish ancestry and his father is from the Cook Islands. He attended Centenary State High School throughout his upbringing and graduated from the school in 2015. Although his official first name is Teremoana, his father gave him the middle name Samson after the biblical figure and he would be known by his middle name until his 21st birthday, at which point he started using his official first name and committed to not cutting his hair in honour of his recently deceased grandfather, with whom he shared the namesake.

Teremoana grew up playing rugby league from the age of five for the West Centenary Panthers in the Brisbane Rugby League junior grades before giving away the sport at 12 years of age when his father he signed him up to participate in boxing at the Inala PCYC. Following high school graduation, Teremoana undertook a four-year plumbing apprenticeship and worked as a full-time plumber for two years before leaving the industry to focus solely on boxing at the age of 24. He has become known for performing the Tila ceremonial dance upon victory in the boxing ring in recognition of his family as well as his Cook Islander heritage.

== Amateur career ==
As a gold medallist at the 2023 Pacific Games in Honiara, Solomon Islands, he qualified to represent Australia in the super-heavyweight event at the 2024 Summer Olympics. In his Olympic debut, he faced Ukraine's Dmytro Lovchynskyi, winning the bout via a first round knockout. In the quarter-finals, he faced Uzbek Bakhodir Jalolov, the reigning Olympic champion, losing the match 5–0 and Jalolov would later go on to win the gold medal again after defeating Teremoana.

== Professional career ==
Teremoana made his professional debut on 3 December 2020 against Drew Jackson. Teremoana would win the fight by technical knockout in the second round. On 30 November 2024, it was announced that he signed for Eddie Hearn's promotion Matchroom Boxing. He made his debut for the promotion on 14 December 2024 against Volodymyr Kutsk, with Teremoana winning the bout via a firsr round technical knockout.

On 18 November 2026, Teremoana stopped Hemi Ahio in the second round at the Pullman Hotel Albert Park in Melbourne, Australia, to win the vacant IBF Inter-Continental heavyweight title.

== Professional boxing record ==
13 fights	13 wins	0 losses
By knockout	13	0
By decision	0	0

No.	Result	Record	Opponent	Type	Round, time	Date	Location	Notes
13	Win	13–0	Hemi Ahio	TKO	2 (10), 1:36	18 Nov 2026	Pullman Hotel Albert Park, Melbourne, Australia	Won vacant IBF Inter-Continental heavyweight title
12	Win	12–0	DeAndre Savage	KO	2 (10), 1:26	12 Aug 2026	The Star, Gold Coast, Australia	
11	Win	11–0	Bowie Tupou	KO	1 (8), 1:14	29 Apr 2026	The Melbourne Pavilion, Melbourne, Australia	
10	Win	10–0	Curtis Harper	KO	1 (8), 2:59	21 Mar 2026	Caribe Royale Orlando, Orlando, Florida, U.S.	
9	Win	9–0	German Garcia Montes	KO	1 (6), 2:37	6 Dec 2025	Convention and Exhibition Center, Gold Coast, Australia	
8	Win	8–0	Aleem Whitfield	TKO	1 (6), 2:28	14 Jun 2025	Madison Square Garden Theater, New York City, New York, U.S.	
7	Win	7–0	James Singh	TKO	1 (6), 2:41	22 Mar 2025	Qudos Bank Arena, Sydney, Australia	
6	Win	6–0	Osasu Otobo	KO	1 (6), 0:57	8 Jan 2025	Convention and Exhibition Center, Gold Coast, Australia	
5	Win	5–0	Volodymyr Katsuk	TKO	1 (6), 2:04	14 Dec 2024	Casino de Monte Carlo, Monte Carlo, Monaco	
4	Win	4–0	Bensyn Pauga	TKO	1 (4), 1:45	10 Sep 2022	Fortitude Music Hall, Brisbane, Australia	
3	Win	3–0	Hunter Sam	TKO	2 (6), 0:54	4 Dec 2021	Fortitude Music Hall, Brisbane, Australia	
2	Win	2–0	Daniel Joyce	TKO	1 (4), 0:59	23 Oct 2021	Convention and Exhibition Center, Gold Coast, Australia	
1	Win	1–0	Drew Jackson	TKO	2 (4), 1:40	3 Dec 2020	Fortitude Music Hall, Brisbane, Australia	
