= Bodybuilding at the 2023 Pacific Games =

- Venue: Maranatha Hall
- Dates: 27 November

Bodybuilding was an event which took place at the 2023 Pacific Games in Honiara, Solomon Islands on November 27.

== Medal summary ==
=== Medal table ===
* Host nation (Solomon Islands)

Bodybuilding medal table
| Rank | Nation | Gold | Silver | Bronze | Total |
|---|---|---|---|---|---|
| 1 | Samoa | 4 | 1 | 1 | 6 |
| 2 | Solomon Islands* | 3 | 4 | 1 | 8 |
| 3 | Papua New Guinea | 3 | 2 | 0 | 5 |
| 4 | New Caledonia | 3 | 1 | 1 | 5 |
| 5 | Tahiti | 1 | 2 | 0 | 3 |
| 6 | Northern Mariana Islands | 1 | 0 | 0 | 1 |
| Totals (6 entries) | | 15 | 10 | 3 | 28 |

=== Men's Results ===
| Event | Gold | Silver | Bronze | Refs |
|---|---|---|---|---|
| −65 kg | Tome Kelesi (SOL) | Iso Finch (PNG) | —N/a | |
| −70 kg | Rexford Viyufa (PNG) | Mustafa Rade (SOL) | Jeremy Vaipule (SAM) | |
| −75 kg | Steve Bomal (PNG) | Silas Kiu (SOL) | Dorian Xenie (NCL) | |
| −80 kg | Barnabas Waga (SOL) | Dominic Yuanis (PNG) | —N/a | |
| −85 kg | Kuaoleni Mercier (TAH) | Alpheus Fiuramo (SOL) | —N/a | |
| −90 kg | Allen Atai (SOL) | John Lemoa (SAM) | —N/a | |
| −100 kg | Lafaele Aukuso (SAM) | Grégory Le Pironnec (NCL) | —N/a | |
| +100 kg | Douglas Yurasi (PNG) | David Ama (SOL) | —N/a | |
| Overall title | Lafaele Aukuso (SAM) | —N/a | —N/a | |

=== Women's Results ===
| Event | Gold | Silver | Bronze | Refs |
|---|---|---|---|---|
| Athletic Physique −165cm | Diane Mouniapin (NCL) | —N/a | —N/a | |
| Athletic Physique +165cm | Sauaso Matautia (SAM) | Gwendo Bouyer (TAH) | —N/a | |
| Overall Athletic Physique | Sauaso Matautia (SAM) | —N/a | —N/a | |
| Model Physique −165cm | Christina Tudela (NMI) | Christine Tahi (TAH) | Yu Chen Guo (SOL) | |
| Model Physique +165cm | Odile Tran (NCL) | —N/a | —N/a | |
| Overall Model Physique | Odile Tran (NCL) | —N/a | —N/a | |
