= Archery at the 2023 Pacific Games =

- Archery pictogram
- Location: Honiara, Solomon Islands
- Dates: 21 – 24 November 2023

Archery at the 2023 Pacific Games in Solomon Islands was held on 21 – 24 November 2023.

== Medal summary ==
=== Medal table ===
* Host nation (Solomon Islands)

Rank	Nation	Gold	Silver	Bronze	Total
1	Australia	4	4	1	9
2	New Caledonia	4	3	3	10
3	French Polynesia	2	2	3	7
4	Tonga	0	1	3	4
5	Samoa	0	0	0	0
Totals (5 entries)		10	10	10	30

== Men's ==
Event	Gold		Silver		Bronze	
Compound - Single 720 Round 50 m	Laurent Clerte (NCL)	662	Henry Shiu (NCL)	653	Xavier Mangoen (NCL)	651
Compound - Match play	Laurent Clerte (NCL)		Xavier Mangoen (NCL)		Julien Ravaudet (TAH)	
Recurve - Single 720 Round 70 m	Ryan Tyack (AUS)		Peter Boukouvalas (AUS)		Jean-Pierre Winkelstroeter (TAH)	
Recurve - Match play	Ryan Tyack (AUS)		Peter Boukouvalas (AUS)		Jean-Pierre Winkelstroeter (TAH)	

== Women's ==
Event	Gold		Silver		Bronze	
Compound - Single 720 Round 50 m	Caroline Balber (NCL)	613	Aurore Cottet (TAH)	587	Ana Fifita (TGA)	569
Compound - Match play	Aurore Cottet (TAH)		Caroline Balber (NCL)		Ana Fifita (TGA)	
Recurve - Single 720 Round 70 m	Laura Paeglis (AUS)		Sarah Haywood (AUS)		Jordane David (NCL)	
Recurve - Match play	Laura Paeglis (AUS)		Sarah Haywood (AUS)		Jordane David (NCL)	

== Mixed ==
Event	Gold	Silver	Bronze
Compound - Team	New Caledonia	French Polynesia	Tonga
Recurve - Team	French Polynesia	Tonga	Australia

== Para Sport ==
Event	Gold	Silver	Bronze
Compound Open - Female			
Compound Open - Male			
