= Outrigger canoeing at the 2023 Pacific Games =

- Va'a pictogram for the Games
- Venue: DC Park
- Location: Honiara, Solomon Islands
- Dates: 27 November – 1 December

The outrigger canoeing competition, mostly referred to as Vaʻa in the Pacific region, at the 2023 Pacific Games was held from 27 November – 1 December 2023 at DC Park in Honiara, Solomon Islands.

== Medal summary ==
=== Medal table ===
* Host nation (Solomon Islands)

Vaʻa medal table
Rank	Nation	Gold	Silver	Bronze	Total
1	Tahiti	12	6	1	19
2	New Caledonia	5	4	7	16
3	Fiji	2	2	3	7
4	Samoa	1	5	0	6
5	Wallis and Futuna	0	3	0	3
6	Cook Islands	0	0	6	6
7	Norfolk Island	0	0	1	1
7	Solomon Islands*	0	0	1	1
Totals (8 entries)		20	20	19	59

=== Men's results ===
Event	Gold		Silver		Bronze		Ref
V1 500 m	Temoana Taputu (TAH)	2:23.51	Maël Legras (NCL)	2:29.87	Andre Tutaka (COK)	2:31.47	
V6 500 m	Tahiti (TAH)	1:41.69	Wallis and Futuna (WLF)	1:42.81	New Caledonia (NCL)	1:43.83	
V6 1500 m	Tahiti (TAH)	8:07.89	Wallis and Futuna (WLF)	8:15.50	Fiji (FIJ)	8:29.89	
V12 500 m	New Caledonia (NCL)	1:55.62	Wallis and Futuna (WLF)	1:56.60	Tahiti (TAH)	2:01.90	
V1 Marathon 16 km (time= h:min:s)	Tuatea Teraiamano (TAH)	1:24:55.00	Titouan Puyo (NCL)	1:27:04.00	Andre Tutaka (COK)	1:31:59.00	
V6 Marathon 24 km (time= h:min:s)	Tahiti (TAH)	1:49:37.00	New Caledonia (NCL)	1:56:58.00	Fiji (FIJ)	2:01:04.00	

=== Women's results ===
Event	Gold		Silver		Bronze		Ref
V1 500 m	Elenoa Vateitei (FIJ)	2:50.42	Anne Cairns (SAM)	2:54.38	Ada Nebauer (NFK)	3:01.01	
V6 500 m	New Caledonia (NCL)	2:00.26	Tahiti (TAH)	2:01.02	Cook Islands (COK)	2:03.16	
V6 1500 m	Tahiti (TAH)	9:52.02	Fiji (FIJ)	10:03.43	Cook Islands (COK)	10:09.32	
V12 500 m	Tahiti (TAH)	2:22.65	New Caledonia (NCL)	2:26.92	Fiji (FIJ)	2:32.95	
V1 Marathon 16 km (time= h:min:s)	Elenoa Vateitei (FIJ)	1:30:09	Mahia Poroi (TAH)	1:31:33	Rosemelle Terii (NCL)	1:32:35	
V6 Marathon 24 km (time= h:min:s)	Tahiti (TAH)	1:58:36.00	Fiji (FIJ)	2:05:13.00	New Caledonia (NCL)	2:07:33.00	

=== Kayak ===
Men's results

Event	Gold		Silver		Bronze		Ref
K1 500 m	Tuva'a Clifton (SAM)	2:00.03	Nohoarii Thuau (TAH)	2:02.06	Andre George (COK)	2:02.73	
K2 500 m	New Caledonia (NCL); Christophe Barrielle; Benjamin Legavre	1:47.99	Tahiti (TAH); Charles Taie; Nohoarii Thuau	1:55.23	Solomon Islands (SOL); Paul Bouro; Saeni Kofela	1:58.23	
K1 Marathon 16 km (time= h:min:s)	Benjamin Legavre (NCL)	1:11:52	Nohoarii Thuau (TAH)	1:11:55	Andre George (COK)	1:17:52	
K2 Marathon 16 km (time= h:min:s)	New Caledonia (NCL); Christophe Barrielle; Benjamin Legavre	1:12:20	Tahiti (TAH); Charles Taie; Nohoarii Thuau	1:12:28			

Women's results

Event	Gold		Silver		Bronze		Ref
K1 500 m	Iloha Eychenne (TAH)	2:11.67	Anne Cairns (SAM)	2:16.30	Charlotte Robin (NCL)	2:24.47	
K2 500 m	Tahiti (TAH); Nateahi Sommer; Iloha Eychenne	2:00.75	Samoa (SAM); Jayde Leota; Anne Cairns	2:08.82	New Caledonia (NCL); Charlotte Robin; Myriam Wejieme	2:11.10	
K1 Marathon 16 km (time= h:min:s)	Iloha Eychenne (TAH)	1:03:16	Anne Cairns (SAM)	1:08:50	Charlotte Robin (NCL)	1:10:25	
K2 Marathon 16 km (time= h:min:s)	Tahiti (TAH); Nateahi Sommer; Iloha Eychenne	1:23:31	Samoa (SAM); Jayde Leota; Anne Cairns	1:36:03	New Caledonia (NCL); Charlotte Robin; Myriam Wejieme	1:43:22	

== See also ==
- Outrigger canoeing at the Pacific Games
