= Alex Mukuka =

Zambian-born New Zealand boxer

Personal information
- Nationality: New Zealand
- Born: 24 March 1996 (age 30) Lusaka, Zambia
- Height: 153 cm (5 ft 0 in)

Boxing career
Medal record
Men's amateur boxing
Representing New Zealand
Pacific Games
Bronze medal – third place	2023 Honiara	Featherweight

Alex Mukuka (born 24 March 1996) is a Zambian-born New Zealand boxer. He competed at the 2023 Pacific Games, winning the bronze medal in the men's featherweight event.

According to The New Zealand Herald, Mukuka was named a "four-time New Zealand boxing champion" in 2025.
