= Samoa at the 2023 Pacific Games =

- IOC code: SAM
- National federation: Samoa Association of Sports and National Olympic Committee

19 November 2023 – 2 December 2023
- Competitors: 332 (182 men and 150 women) in 24 sports
- Flag bearer: Don Opeloge
- Officials: Leiataualesā Jerry Brunt (chef de mission)
- Medals Ranked 4th: Gold 34 Silver 21 Bronze 21 Total 76

Pacific Games appearances
- 1963; 1966; 1969; 1971; 1975; 1979; 1983; 1987; 1991; 1995; 1999; 2003; 2007; 2011; 2015; 2019; 2023

Samoa competed at the 2023 Pacific Games in Honiara, Solomon Islands from 19 November to 2 December 2023.

== Competitors ==
The following is the list of number of competitors in the Games.

Sport	Men	Women	Total
Archery			5
Athletics			26
Basketball	16	16	32
Bodybuilding			8
Boxing			13
Football	21	22	43
Golf	4	4	8
Judo			3
Karate			
Powerlifting			
Rugby league nines	12	12	24
Rugby sevens	12	0	12
Sailing			4
Swimming			7
Table tennis			6
Taekwondo			4
Tennis			8
Touch rugby	14	14	28
Triathlon	3	3	6
Va'a			24
Volleyball	16	16	32
Weightlifting			14
Total			
