= Tyla McDonald =

Australian boxer (born 2003)

Personal information
- Born: 19 April 2003 (age 23) Melbourne, Victoria, Australia
- Height: 5 ft 5 in (165 cm)

Sport
- Sport: Boxing
- Weight class: Lightweight
Medal record
Women's amateur boxing
Representing Australia
Pacific Games
Gold medal – first place	2023 Honiara	60kg

Tyla McDonald (born 19 April 2003) is an Australian boxer. A four-time national champion, she won the gold medal in the 60kg division at the 2023 Pacific Games to secure a place in the same weight category at the 2024 Summer Olympics, where she lost in the round-of-16 to María José Palacios from Ecuador.
