= Shannan Davey =

Australian boxer (born 1999)

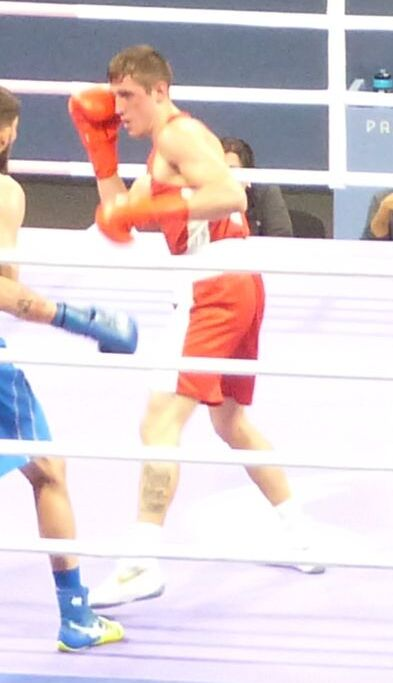

Personal information
- Nationality: Australia
- Born: 3 September 1999 (age 26) Narrabri, New South Wales, Australia

Boxing career
Medal record
Men's amateur boxing
Representing Australia
Pacific Games
Gold medal – first place	2023 Honiara	Light middleweight

Shannan Davey (born 3 September 1999) is an Australian boxer. He competed in the men's 71 kg event at the 2024 Summer Olympics.
