= Rugby league nines at the 2023 Pacific Games =

- Rugby league 9's pictogram for the Games
- Venue: National Stadium
- Location: Honiara, Solomon Islands
- Dates: 20–22 November 2023
- Competitors: 5 men's teams 6 women's teams

Medalists
gold medal	Men	Samoa
gold medal	Women	Cook Islands
silver medal	Men	Fiji
silver medal	Women	Tonga
bronze medal	Men	Cook Islands
bronze medal	Women	Fiji

Rugby league nines at the 2023 Pacific Games was held in Honiara, Solomon Islands, from 20 to 22 November 2023. The rugby league nines competition took place at the Solomon Islands National Stadium.

== Participating teams ==
These are the following teams participating in the Rugby league nines at the 2023 Pacific Games in the Solomon Islands.

Men

- Solomon Islands
- Cook Islands
- Fiji
- Samoa
- Tonga

Women

- Tonga
- Cook Islands
- Fiji
- Samoa
- Vanuatu
- Solomon Islands

== Medal summary ==
=== Medal table ===
* Host nation (Solomon Islands)

Rank	Nation	Gold	Silver	Bronze	Total
1	Cook Islands	1	0	1	2
2	Samoa	1	0	0	1
3	Fiji	0	1	1	2
4	Tonga	0	1	0	1
Totals (4 entries)		2	2	2	6

=== Medalists ===
Event	Gold	Silver	Bronze
Men's tournament	Samoa; Alosio Afa; James Atonio; Bessie Aufaga; Eseroma Lewer; Tupea Matau; Holly Pesamino; Larry Sang Yum; Sounda Seumanutafa; Ono Sooialo; Kyran Tanuvasa; Faresa Timo Perenise; Ionatana Tinoa Sua; Kalepo Tuifua; Chris Vaifale; Jerome Veve	Fiji; Eremasi Batibasaga; Aminio Cama; Ilisevani Jegesa; Penaia Nadakuni; Viliame Naikausa; Rusiate Ratukana; Kelevi Rawalai; Ratu Rokonavutoro; Etonia Saukuru; Jone Sauvaka; Jona Sawailau; Ropate Tobe; Vilikesa Tuidama; Poseci Tuivanuavou; Jovesa Vetaukula; Josese Yaya	Cook Islands; Adyn Anguna; Delano Atai; Kadiyae Ioka; Utah Ioka; Andre Iro; Toru Katuke; Emphraim Morgan; Malachi Morgan; Joshua Motu; Eric Newbigging; Tama Nicholas; Jaman Rio; Habasaloma Tamarua; Adam Tangata; Daniel Toa; Mark Tuaati
Women's tournament	Cook Islands; Ngatokotoru Arakua; Kaiyah Atai; Jamie Gotty; Chantelle Holloway-Samuels; Jodeci Joseph; Chantay Kiria-Ratu; Chelsea Makira; Kerehitina Matua; Stephanie Nooroa; Kiana Sword-Tua; Lydia Turua-Quedley; June Willie	Tonga; Courtney Afeaki; Iunaise Fakahua; Mele Fotu-Moala; Metanoia Fotu-Moala; Lose Mafi; Sositine Misinale; Ana Ngahe; Kimberly Nikua; Siunipa Pahulu; Lavinia Tauhalaliku; Printney Tuiaki; Lumi Uhila; Pauline Vailanu; Ileana Vea; Eseta Vuki	Fiji; Shannon Batibasaga; Asenava Diranuve; Litia Kereburogo; Alesi Kilawekana; Alena Lako; Sokoveti Mokubula; Ateca Nacaucauceva; Vilimaina Naituku; Vasemaca Ralaca; Salote Sukukinamena; Laisa Takayawa; Laisa Vosa; Kinisalote Vusawa; Adi Waqa; Grace Waqa

== Match results ==
All matches were played at the National Stadium, Honiara.

=== Men ===
20 November 2023
16:15 (UTC+11:00)

Cook Islands	16 – 8	Solomon Islands
	Scores

20 November 2023
16:40 (UTC+11:00)

Fiji	20 – 0	Tonga
	Scores

20 November 2023
18:20 (UTC+11:00)

Samoa	18 – 12	Fiji
	Scores

20 November 2023
18:45 (UTC+11:00)

Tonga	14 – 12	Solomon Islands
	Scores

21 November 2023
15:00 (UTC+11:00)

Fiji	28 – 6	Solomon Islands
	Scores

21 November 2023
15:25 (UTC+11:00)

Samoa	22 – 6	Cook Islands
	Scores

21 November 2023
17:05 (UTC+11:00)

Samoa	22 – 4	Solomon Islands
	Scores

21 November 2023
17:30 (UTC+11:00)

Cook Islands	18 – 10	Tonga
	Scores

21 November 2023
19:10 (UTC+11:00)

Fiji	24 – 8	Cook Islands
	Scores

21 November 2023
19:35 (UTC+11:00)

Samoa	30 – 12	Tonga
	Scores

==== Points table ====
Pos	Team	Pld	W	D	L	PF	PA	PD	Pts	Qualification
1	Samoa	4	4	0	0	92	34	58	8	Qualified for Gold Medal Match
2	Fiji	4	3	0	1	84	32	52	6	Qualified for Gold Medal Match
3	Cook Islands	4	2	0	2	48	64	-16	4	Qualified for Bronze Medal Match
4	Tonga	4	1	0	3	36	80	-44	2	Qualified for Bronze Medal Match
5	Solomon Islands	4	0	0	4	30	80	-50	0	

==== Bronze medal match ====
22 November 2023
18:30 (UTC+11:00)

Cook Islands	16 – 7	Tonga
	Scores

==== Gold medal match ====
22 November 2023
19:00 (UTC+11:00)

Samoa	8 – 0	Fiji
	Scores

=== Women ===
20 November 2023
15:00 (UTC+11:00)

Cook Islands	36 – 0	Solomon Islands
	Scores

20 November 2023
15:25 (UTC+11:00)

Tonga	16 – 0	Vanuatu
	Scores

20 November 2023
15:50 (UTC+11:00)

Fiji	22 – 10	Samoa
	Scores

20 November 2023
17:05 (UTC+11:00)

Cook Islands	28 – 6	Vanuatu
	Scores

20 November 2023
17:30 (UTC+11:00)

Samoa	20 – 8	Solomon Islands
	Scores

20 November 2023
17:55 (UTC+11:00)

Tonga	14 – 8	Fiji
	Scores

20 November 2023
19:10 (UTC+11:00)

Fiji	44 – 0	Vanuatu
	Scores

20 November 2023
19:35 (UTC+11:00)

Cook Islands	20 – 4	Samoa
	Scores

20 November 2023
20:00 (UTC+11:00)

Tonga	16 – 6	Solomon Islands
	Scores

21 November 2023
15:50 (UTC+11:00)

Fiji	18 – 10	Cook Islands
	Scores

21 November 2023
16:15 (UTC+11:00)

Tonga	18 – 0	Samoa
	Scores

21 November 2023
16:40 (UTC+11:00)

Vanuatu	8 – 4	Solomon Islands
	Scores

21 November 2023
17:55 (UTC+11:00)

Tonga	12 – 10	Cook Islands
	Scores

21 November 2023
18:20 (UTC+11:00)

Samoa	28 – 8	Vanuatu
	Scores

21 November 2023
18:45 (UTC+11:00)

Fiji	18 – 0	Solomon Islands
	Scores

==== Points table ====
Pos	Team	Pld	W	D	L	PF	PA	PD	Pts	Qualification
1	Tonga	5	5	0	0	76	24	52	10	Qualified for Gold Medal Match
2	Cook Islands	5	4	0	1	112	32	80	8	Qualified for Gold Medal Match
3	Fiji	5	3	0	2	102	42	60	6	Qualified for Bronze Medal Match
4	Samoa	5	2	0	3	62	76	-14	4	Qualified for Bronze Medal Match
5	Vanuatu	5	1	0	4	22	120	-98	2	
6	Solomon Islands	5	0	0	5	18	98	-80	0	

==== Fifth place match ====
22 November 2023
17:30 (UTC+11:00)

Vanuatu	12 – 4	Solomon Islands
	Scores

==== Bronze medal match ====
22 November 2023
18:00 (UTC+11:00)

Fiji	4 – 0	Samoa
	Scores

==== Gold medal match ====
22 November 2023
18:30 (UTC+11:00)

Cook Islands	16 – 8	Tonga
	Scores
