= Northern Mariana Islands at the 2019 Pacific Games =

- IOC code: NMI

8 July 2019 – 20 July 2019
- Competitors: in 9 sports
- Medals: Gold 0 Silver 0 Bronze 0 Total 0

Pacific Games appearances
- 1979; 1983; 1987; 1991; 1995; 1999; 2003; 2007; 2011; 2015; 2019; 2023

Northern Mariana Islands competed at the 2019 Pacific Games in Apia, Samoa from 7 to 20 July 2019. The country participated in nine sports at the 2019 games.

== Badminton ==
The Marianas named five men and two women in their badminton team for the 2019 games.

Men

- Andreau Galvez
- Nathan Guerrero
- Daniel Macario
- Ezekiel Macario
- Jordan Pangilinan

Women

- Nicole Malasarte
- Janelle Pangilinan

== Basketball ==
=== 5x5 ===
==== Men's basketball ====
- TBC

==== Women's basketball ====
- TBC

=== 3x3 ===
==== Men ====
- TBC

==== Women ====
- TBC

== Golf ==
Northern Marianas nominated five players male for the tournament in Samoa, with one to be omitted.

Men

- Joseph Camacho
- Marco Peter
- Sebastian Camacho
- Jessie Atalig
- Ryan Kim

== Volleyball ==
=== Beach volleyball ===
CNMI selected a men's pair (father and son) for their beach volleyball team at the 2019 games.

Men

- Tyce Mister
- Logan Mister
