= Tiana Echegaray =

Australian boxer (born 1993)

Personal information
- Born: Tiana Marie Baker Echegaray; 16 September 1993 (age 32) Brisbane, Queensland, Australia
- Height: 5 ft 3 in (160 cm)

Sport
- Sport: Boxing
- Weight class: Bantamweight
Medal record
Women's amateur boxing
Representing Australia
Pacific Games
Gold medal – first place	2023 Honiara	54kg

Tiana Echegaray (born 16 September 1993) is an Australian boxer. Having taken up boxing in 2019 as a way to keep fit, she had her first competitive bout two years later and won national titles in 2022 and 2023, before claiming the gold medal in the 54kg division at the 2023 Pacific Games to secure a place at the 2024 Summer Olympics. Echegaray lost in the 54kg round-of-16 at the Games in Paris to eventual silver medalist Hatice Akbaş from Turkey.
