= Football at the 2023 Pacific Games =

- Football pictogram for the Games
- Venue: Various
- Location: Honiara, Solomon Islands
- Dates: 17 November–1 December 2023
- Teams: 12 (Men's); 10 (Women's)

Medalists
gold medal	New Caledonia (men); Papua New Guinea (women)
silver medal	Solomon Islands (men); Fiji (women)
bronze medal	Fiji (men); New Caledonia (women)

Football at the 2023 Pacific Games was held in Honiara, Solomon Islands from 17 November–1 December 2023.

== Participants ==
Men's

- American Samoa
- Cook Islands
- Fiji
- ~~Kiribati~~
- New Caledonia
- Northern Mariana Islands
- Papua New Guinea
- Samoa
- Solomon Islands (Host)
- Tahiti
- Tonga
- Tuvalu
- Vanuatu

Women's

- American Samoa
- Cook Islands
- Fiji
- New Caledonia
- Papua New Guinea
- Samoa
- Solomon Islands (Host)
- Tahiti
- Tonga
- Vanuatu

== Medal summary ==
=== Medal table ===
* Host nation (Solomon Islands)

Rank	Nation	Gold	Silver	Bronze	Total
1	New Caledonia	1	0	1	2
2	Papua New Guinea	1	0	0	1
3	Fiji	0	1	1	2
4	Solomon Islands*	0	1	0	1
Totals (4 entries)		2	2	2	6

=== Medalists ===
Event	Gold	Silver	Bronze
Men	New Caledonia; Gabriel Vakoume; William Rokuad; Vincent Vakié; Martin Makam; Morgan Mathelon; Pierre Bako; Lues Waya; Willy Read; César Lolohea; Shene Wélépane; Josué Welepane; Titouan Richard; Gérard Waia; Jean-Jacques Katrawa; Bernard Iwa; Makalué Xowi; Roberto Néoéré; Gianni Manmieu	Solomon Islands; Philip Mango; Loea Taisara; Allen Peter; Leon Kofana; Javin Alick; Atkin Kaua; Micah Lea'alafa; Molis Gagame; Bobby Leslie; Raphael Lea'i; Gagame Feni; Michael Laulae; John Orobulu; Molea Tigi; William Komasi; Calvin Ohasio; Alwin Hou; Aengari Gagame; Joses Nawo; Timothy Mae'arasia; David Supa; Alick Stanton; Marlon Tahioa	Fiji; Alzaar Alam; Brendan McMullen; Epeli Leiroti; Patrick Joseph; Sitiveni Cavuilagi; Thomas Dunn; Dave Radrigai; Setareki Hughes; Roy Krishna; Nabil Begg; Ilimotama Jese; Tevita Waranaivalu; Ramzan Khan; Sairusi Nalaubu; Etonia Dogalau; Gabiriele Matanisiga; Filipe Baravilala; Lekima Gonerau; Merrill Nand; Isikeli Sevanaia; Sterling Vasconcellos; Akuila Mateisuva; Kishan Sami
Women	Papua New Guinea; Faith Kasiray; Serah Waida; Anashtasia Gunemba; Olivia Upaupa; Georgina Bakani; Rumona Morris; Ramona Padio; Michaelyne Butubu; Calista Maneo; Marie Kaipu; Nenny Elipas; Lavina Hola; Christie Maneu; Phylis Pala; Mavis Singara; Merolyne Sali; Ginnimari Wambi; Mayah Samai; Glories Miag; Fidorah Namuesh; Grace Batiy; Gloria Laeli; Arnolda Dou	Fiji; Filomena Racea; Adi Litia Bakaniceva; Vanisha Kumar; Cema Nasau; Narieta Leba; Aliza Hussein; Trina Davis; Luisa Tamanitoakula; Jotivini Tabua; Louisa Simmons; Ema Mereia; Unaisi Tuberi; Sonia Alfred; Sofi Diyalowai; Imeri Nai; Naomi Waqanidrola; Angeline Rekha; Seruwaia Laulaba; Sereana Naweni; Selai Tikosuva; Shayal Sindhika	New Caledonia; Anais Walei Konhu; Madeleine Jaine; Claire Kaemo; Mélissa Iekawe; Kamen Simane; Marthe Katrawa; Edsy Matao; Henako Wahnawe; Fiona Ihage; Alice Wenessia; Ronaldine Hnaune; Waohma Ophelie Ujicas; Cécilia Waheo; Julia Honakoko; Deborah Waika Selefen; Jennel Ligneul; Marie-Laure Palene; Océanne Elineau; Louise Luepak; Lorenza Hnamano; Germaine Pouye
