= Judo at the 2023 Pacific Games =

Judo competition

Judo Judo at the 2023 Pacific Games
- Judo pictogram for the Games
- Venue: SIFF Academy
- Location: Honiara, Solomon Islands
- Dates: 20–21 November

Competition at external databases
- Links: IJF • JudoInside

Judo competitions at the 2023 Pacific Games in the Solomon Islands took place on 20 and 21 November at SIFF Academy in Honiara.

== Participating nations ==
Eleven countries and territories entered judokas for the tournament.

- Australia (8)
- French Polynesia (21)
- Kiribati (4)
- Nauru (7)
- New Caledonia (17)
- Palau (2)
- Samoa (3)
- Solomon Islands (26) (Host)
- Tokelau (1)
- Tonga (3)
- Vanuatu (4)

== Medal summary ==
A total of 17 medal events (8 per gender and 1 mixed event) were scheduled for the judo tournament.

=== Medal table ===
* Host nation (Solomon Islands)

Rank	Nation	Gold	Silver	Bronze	Total
1	Australia	8	1	2	11
2	New Caledonia	5	7	9	21
3	French Polynesia	4	6	8	18
4	Solomon Islands*	0	2	1	3
5	Vanuatu	0	1	2	3
6	Tonga	0	0	2	2
7	Kiribati	0	0	1	1
7	Samoa	0	0	1	1
Totals (8 entries)		17	17	26	60

=== Men's events ===
Event	Gold	Silver	Bronze
Extra-lightweight (60 kg)	Tamaterai Herve; French Polynesia	Matteo Lepauvre; New Caledonia	Antoine Deprez; New Caledonia
Extra-lightweight (60 kg)	Tamaterai Herve; French Polynesia	Matteo Lepauvre; New Caledonia	Tebania Mwemwenikeaki; Kiribati
Half-lightweight (66 kg)	Jordon Greenbank; Australia	Pierrick Idmont; New Caledonia	Maxime Taramarcaz; New Caledonia
Half-lightweight (66 kg)	Jordon Greenbank; Australia	Pierrick Idmont; New Caledonia	Manatoa Luciani; French Polynesia
Lightweight (73 kg)	Ryan Koenig; Australia	Cedric Jaszczyszyn; New Caledonia	Antoine Marcuzzo; New Caledonia
Lightweight (73 kg)	Ryan Koenig; Australia	Cedric Jaszczyszyn; New Caledonia	Gaston Lafon; French Polynesia
Half-middleweight (81 kg)	Jason Apavou; New Caledonia	Toanui Lucas; French Polynesia	Paulo Taukafauli; New Caledonia
Half-middleweight (81 kg)	Jason Apavou; New Caledonia	Toanui Lucas; French Polynesia	Carstens Beyers; Australia
Middleweight (90 kg)	Danny Vojnikovich; Australia	Maevarau Le Gayic; French Polynesia	Maasi Falevalu; New Caledonia
Middleweight (90 kg)	Danny Vojnikovich; Australia	Maevarau Le Gayic; French Polynesia	Vincent Neris; New Caledonia
Half-heavyweight (100 kg)	Ponove Falevalu; New Caledonia	Julien Ragusa; French Polynesia	Evan Jolif; French Polynesia
Half-heavyweight (100 kg)	Ponove Falevalu; New Caledonia	Julien Ragusa; French Polynesia	Yasmin Aho; Tonga
Heavyweight (+100 kg)	Jeremy Picard; French Polynesia	Teva Gouriou; New Caledonia	Derek Sua; Samoa
Heavyweight (+100 kg)	Jeremy Picard; French Polynesia	Teva Gouriou; New Caledonia	Sailosi Ealelei; Tonga
Open	Teva Gouriou; New Caledonia	Carstens Beyers; Australia	Jeremy Picard; French Polynesia
Open	Teva Gouriou; New Caledonia	Carstens Beyers; Australia	Ponove Falevalu; New Caledonia

=== Women's events ===
Event	Gold	Silver	Bronze
Extra-lightweight (48 kg)	Ambre Popoff; French Polynesia	Veronica Tari; Vanuatu	Anna Bumseng; Vanuatu
Extra-lightweight (48 kg)	Ambre Popoff; French Polynesia	Veronica Tari; Vanuatu	—N/a
Half-lightweight (52 kg)	Anneliese Fielder; Australia	Joy Quemener; New Caledonia	Poeiti Golhen; French Polynesia
Half-lightweight (52 kg)	Anneliese Fielder; Australia	Joy Quemener; New Caledonia	Prisicillia Monthouel; Vanuatu
Lightweight (57 kg)	Joyce Brival; New Caledonia	Laetitia Wuilmet; French Polynesia	Deborah Bocahut; New Caledonia
Lightweight (57 kg)	Joyce Brival; New Caledonia	Laetitia Wuilmet; French Polynesia	—N/a
Half-middleweight (63 kg)	Teraimatuatini Bopp; French Polynesia	Teipoteani Tevenino; French Polynesia	Georgina George; Solomon Islands
Half-middleweight (63 kg)	Teraimatuatini Bopp; French Polynesia	Teipoteani Tevenino; French Polynesia	—N/a
Middleweight (70 kg)	Saya Middleton; Australia	Anais Gopea; New Caledonia	Haukea Vitielli; French Polynesia
Middleweight (70 kg)	Saya Middleton; Australia	Anais Gopea; New Caledonia	Imihia Teumere; French Polynesia
Half-heavyweight (78 kg)	Alannah Joyce; Australia	Elizabeth Tengai; Solomon Islands	—N/a
Half-heavyweight (78 kg)	Alannah Joyce; Australia	Elizabeth Tengai; Solomon Islands	—N/a
Heavyweight (+78 kg)	Korfoi Biu; Australia	Edith Kofela; Solomon Islands	—N/a
Heavyweight (+78 kg)	Korfoi Biu; Australia	Edith Kofela; Solomon Islands	—N/a
Open	Anais Gopea; New Caledonia	Teraimatuatini Bopp; French Polynesia	Ashley Suta dit Saponia; New Caledonia
Open	Anais Gopea; New Caledonia	Teraimatuatini Bopp; French Polynesia	Saya Middleton; Australia

=== Mixed team ===
Event	Gold	Silver	Bronze
Mixed team	Australia; Anneliese Fielder; Ryan Koenig; Saya Middleton; Carstens Beyers; Alannah Joyce; Danny Vojnikovich	New Caledonia; Joyce Brival; Cedric Jaszczyszyn; Anais Gopea; Pierrick Idmont; Vincent Neris; Ashley Suta dit Saponia; Teva Gouriou	French Polynesia; Poeiti Golhen; Noa Gustin; Laetitia Wuilmet; Gaston Lafon; Imihia Teumere; Toanui Lucas; Maevarau Le Gayic; Teraimatuatini Bopp; Evan Jolif; Jeremy Picard

== See also ==
- Judo at the Pacific Games
- Judo at the 2024 Summer Olympics
