= Monique Suraci =

Australian boxer (born 2001)

Personal information
- Nickname: Slique
- Born: 12 January 2001 (age 25) Canberra, Australian Capital Territory, Australia
- Height: 5 ft 2 in (157 cm)

Sport
- Sport: Boxing
- Weight class: Flyweight
Medal record
Women's amateur boxing
Representing Australia
Pacific Games
Gold medal – first place	2023 Honiara	50kg

Monique Suraci (born 12 January 2001) is an Australian boxer. Having taken up boxing aged six, she won the gold medal in the 50kg division at the 2023 Pacific Games to secure a place in the same weight category at the 2024 Summer Olympics, where she lost in the round-of-16 to Ingrit Valencia from Colombia.
