= Golf at the 2023 Pacific Games =

- Golf pictogram for the Games
- Venue: Honiara Golf Club
- Location: Honiara, Solomon Islands
- Dates: 22–25 November 2023

Golf at the 2023 Pacific Games in Honiara, Solomon Islands featured four events, individual competitions for men and women and team competitions as well.

== Participating nations ==
The list shows the number of participating athletes from each nation.

- Cook Islands
- Fiji
- New Caledonia
- Northern Mariana Islands
- Papua New Guinea
- Samoa
- Solomon Islands (Host)
- Tahiti
- Tonga
- Vanuatu

== Medal summary ==
=== Medal table ===
* Host nation (Solomon Islands)

Rank	Nation	Gold	Silver	Bronze	Total
1	New Caledonia	3	1	1	5
2	Tonga	1	0	0	1
3	Papua New Guinea	0	3	0	3
4	Samoa	0	0	2	2
5	Tahiti	0	0	1	1
Totals (5 entries)		4	4	4	12

=== Men's results ===
Event	Gold		Silver		Bronze	
Individual	Guillaume Castagne; New Caledonia	281	Morgan Annato; Papua New Guinea	286	Hugo Denis; New Caledonia	287
Team	New Caledonia	865	Papua New Guinea	878	Samoa	899

=== Women's results ===
Event	Gold		Silver		Bronze	
Individual	Alexis Vakasiuola; Tonga	291	Priscilla Gracia Lormand; New Caledonia	301	Kirra St. Laurent; Tahiti	306
Team	New Caledonia	927	Papua New Guinea	934	Samoa	949

== See also ==
- Golf at the Pacific Games
