= Volleyball at the 2023 Pacific Games =

- Volleyball pictogram for the Games
- Venue: Friendship Hall (indoor); SIFF Academy (beach)
- Location: Honiara, Solomon Islands
- Dates: 17 – 25 November (indoor); 28 November – 2 December (beach)

The volleyball tournaments at the 2023 Pacific Games in Honiara were held from 17 November to 2 December 2023. 18 volleyball teams and 29 beach volleyball teams participated in the tournament. Indoor volleyball competitions took place at Friendship Hall with the beach volleyball tournament staged at the SIFF Academy.

== Participating countries ==
- Australia
- Tahiti
- New Caledonia
- Solomon Islands
- Tuvalu
- Fiji
- Northern Mariana Islands
- Samoa
- Vanuatu

== Medal summary ==
=== Medal table ===
* Host nation (Solomon Islands)

Rank	Nation	Gold	Silver	Bronze	Total
1	Australia	2	0	0	2
1	Tahiti	2	0	0	2
3	New Caledonia	0	1	0	1
3	Papua New Guinea	0	1	0	1
3	Solomon Islands*	0	1	0	1
3	Tuvalu	0	1	0	1
7	Fiji	0	0	1	1
7	Northern Mariana Islands	0	0	1	1
7	Samoa	0	0	1	1
7	Vanuatu	0	0	1	1
Totals (10 entries)		4	4	4	12

=== Medalists ===
Beach volleyball

Event	Gold	Silver	Bronze
Men	Australia; Ben Hood; D'Artagnan Potts	Tuvalu; Saaga Malosa; Ampex Isaac	Northern Mariana Islands; Andrew Johnson; Logan Mister
Women	Australia; Stefanie Fejes; Jana Milutinovic	Solomon Islands; Hannah U'una; Kirstain Puia	Vanuatu; Majabelle Lawac; Sherysyn Toko

Indoor volleyball

Event	Gold	Silver	Bronze
Men	Tahiti; Kayan Siksou; Yoan Paofai; Vatea Tauraa; Manuarii Roopinia; Vaianuu Mare; Raitini Tetuanui; Keitagi Labaste; Christophe Ariitai; Hevanoa Vaki; Torea Mare; Torii Tehaeura	Papua New Guinea; Jnr Harold Gima; Edward Aisi; David John; Arnold Daera; Paul Solomon; Billy Anton; Rolley Forova; Eka Solomon; Andrew Kapi; Ani Alipet; Koi Onne; John Soi; Heni Botiba; Joe Mora	Samoa; Iaone Talalelei Gago; Harold Talamaivao; Glen Young Yen; Angelbenn Iosefo; Michael Teofilo; Tofamamao Leiite Paulo; Duane Kuresa Motu; Lolopo Dave-Agalulu; Tui Talaia; Matthew Gafoa Tofilua; Jason Tavita Manuo; Joseph Vaetoe; Palota Utuva; Koki Koki Mate
Women	Tahiti; Lokelani Vero; Marie-Rose Adams; Lanahei Touaitahuata; Kumuhei Heitaa; Vaiarava Rochette; Vaikehu Teikihuavanaka; Maihiti Huria; Makea Taupua; Hanalei Pecheret; Taiana Tere; Vaiteani Vaki; Hinanui Teai	New Caledonia; Melyssandre Eatene; Wakalen Ngaiohni; Fatima Tuutaane; Liwenda Manuohalalo; Moone Konhu; Jasmina Wahiobe; Sarah Nehoune; Blanche Nyipe; Joyce Xolawawa; Marie Natu; Madeleine Haewegene; Beverly Vaoheilala; Orlane Wayaridri; Lonelzy Sio	Fiji; Marica Togayali; Miriama Francis; Sereana Turova; Saravina Veredamu; Miliana Ratuleva; Roko Eka Tabakaucoro; Ulamila Karisitiana; Verenaisi Caginavanua; Sally Aitcheson; Vunise Mateiwai; Sainimere Sema; Peniana Tokaduadua; Gloria Taylor

== Draw ==
=== Men ===
The teams were distributed according to their position at the 2019 Pacific Games.

Pool A

- Solomon Islands (Host)
- New Caledonia
- Samoa
- Kiribati
- Tonga

Pool B

- French Polynesia
- Papua New Guinea
- American Samoa
- Tuvalu
- Fiji

=== Women ===
The teams were distributed according to their position at the 2019 Pacific Games.

Pool A

- Solomon Islands (Host)
- French Polynesia
- American Samoa
- Papua New Guinea

Pool B

- New Caledonia
- Samoa
- Tuvalu
- Fiji
