= Yusuf Chothia =

South African born Australian boxer (born 2001)

Personal information
- Nationality: (Australia) Australian
- Born: 20 February 2001 (age 25) Johannesburg, Gauteng, South Africa
- Height: 5 ft 3 in (160 cm)

Sport
- Sport: Boxing
- Weight class: Flyweight
Medal record
Men's amateur boxing
Representing Australia
Pacific Games
Gold medal – first place	2023 Honiara	51kg

Yusuf Chothia (born 20 February 2001) is a South African born Australian boxer. A three-time national champion, he represented Australia in the 51kg division at the 2024 Summer Olympics, losing in the round-of-16 to Spain's Rafael Lozano Serrano.
