= Tennis at the 2023 Pacific Games =

- Tennis pictogram for the Games
- Venue: National Tennis Center
- Location: Honiara, Solomon Islands
- Dates: 17 – 30 November 2023

The tennis competition at the 2023 Pacific Games took place from 17 to 30 November 2023 at the National Tennis Center in Honiara, Solomon Islands. Tennis is one of four sports on the 2023 Pacific Games programme that is scheduled to begin two days prior to the official opening of the Games.

== Participating nations ==
Thirteen countries and territories have confirmed their participation in the Games. Each Pacific Games association is allowed to enter a maximum of eight athletes, with no more than five of the same gender.

Pacific Games Associations
- Cook Islands (7)
- Fiji (8)
- Guam (7)
- Nauru (6)
- New Caledonia (3)
- Northern Mariana Islands (4)
- Papua New Guinea (8)
- Samoa (8)
- Solomon Islands (8) (Host)
- Tahiti (8)
- Tonga (6)
- Tuvalu (4)
- Vanuatu (7)

== Medal summary ==
=== Medal table ===
* Host nation (Solomon Islands)

Rank	Nation	Gold	Silver	Bronze	Total
1	Samoa	2	1	1	4
2	Papua New Guinea	2	0	2	4
3	Fiji	1	0	2	3
4	Guam	1	0	1	2
4	New Caledonia	1	0	1	2
6	Tahiti	0	3	0	3
7	Solomon Islands*	0	2	0	2
8	Tuvalu	0	1	0	1
Totals (8 entries)		7	7	7	21

=== Medal events ===
Event	Gold	Silver	Bronze
Men's singles	Heremana Courte; New Caledonia	Heve Kelley; French Polynesia	Matthew Stubbings; Papua New Guinea
Men's doubles	Fiji; Charles Cornish; William O'Connell	Tuvalu; Faolina Haleti; Maka Ofati	Guam; Camden Camacho; Daniel Llarenas
Men's team	Guam	French Polynesia	New Caledonia
Women's singles	Abigail Tere-Apisah; Papua New Guinea	Annerly Georgopoulos; Samoa	Eleanor Schuster; Samoa
Women's doubles	Samoa; Annerly Georgopoulos; Eleanor Schuster	Solomon Islands; Zorika Morgan; Georgimah Row	Fiji; Ruby Coffin; Tarani Kamoe
Women's team	Samoa	Solomon Islands	Papua New Guinea
Mixed doubles	Papua New Guinea; Abigail Tere-Apisah; Matthew Stubbings	Tahiti; Mehitia Boosie; Antoine Voisin	Fiji; Tarani Kamoe; William O'Connell

== See also ==
- Tennis at the Pacific Games
