= Vanuatu at the 2023 Pacific Games =

- National federation: Vanuatu Association of Sports and National Olympic Committee

19 November 2023 – 2 December 2023
- Competitors: 158 (85 men and 73 women) in 9 sports
- Flag bearer: Anolyn Lulu
- Medals Ranked 15th: Gold 3 Silver 5 Bronze 11 Total 19

Pacific Games appearances
- 1983; 1987; 1991; 1995; 1999; 2003; 2007; 2011; 2015; 2019; 2023

Vanuatu competed at the 2023 Pacific Games in Honiara from 19 November to 2 December 2023. Vanuatu athletes have appeared in every edition of the Pacific Games since the inaugural games in 1963.

== Competitors ==
The following is the list of number of competitors confirmed for the Games.

Sport	Men	Women	Total
Archery	3	0	3
Athletics	15	7	22
Field hockey	9	9	18
Football	23	23	46
Judo	2	3	5
Netball	—N/a	12	12
Rugby league nines	16	16	32
Volleyball	16	2	18
Weightlifting	1	1	2
Total	85	73	158

== Archery ==
The Vanuatu Achery Federation (VAF) has announced three archers.

- Francis Runa
- Danick Aisik
- Bradley Nuaita

== Athletics ==
Vanuatu will enter 22 athletes for the Games. Athletics Vanuatu selected 16 athletes in track and field on 2 November 2023. Six para-athletes have also been entered for the Games.

Key

- Note–Ranks given for track events are within the athlete's heat only
- Q = Qualified for the next round
- q = Qualified for the next round as a fastest loser or, in field events, by position without achieving the qualifying target
- qR = Qualified to the next round by referee judgement
- NR = National record
- N/A = Round not applicable for the event
- Bye = Athlete not required to compete in round

Track and road events
Men

Athlete	Event	Heat		Semifinal		Final	
Athlete	Event	Result	Rank	Result	Rank	Result	Rank
Toho Joshua	100 m						
Toho Joshua	200 m						
Tikie Terry Mael	100 m						
Tikie Terry Mael	200 m						
Kieron Kapea Meake	100 m						
Obediah Timbaci	200 m						
Obediah Timbaci	400 m						
Rizon Leo Rara	400 m						
Elijah Aru	800 m						
Elijah Aru	1500 m						
Steven Hungai	800 m						
Steven Hungai	1500 m						
Sam Kuras	5000 m						
Sam Kuras	10000 m						
Sam Kuras	Half marathon						
Sam Kuras	3000 m steeplechase						
	4×100 m relay			—N/a			
	4×400 m relay	—N/a					

Women

Athlete	Event	Heat		Semifinal		Final	
Athlete	Event	Result	Rank	Result	Rank	Result	Rank
Lyza Malres	100 m						
Chloe David	100 m						
Chloe David	200 m						
Claudie David	100 m						
Claudie David	200 m						
Talap Napuat	1500 m						
Talap Napuat	5000 m						
Talap Napuat	10000 m						
Talap Napuat	3000 m steeplechase						
Marie Harry	5000 m						
Marie Harry	10000 m						
Marie Harry	Half marathon						
Melody Sam	5000 m						
Melody Sam	10000 m						
Melody Sam	Half marathon						
Melody Sam	3000 m steeplechase						
	4×100 m relay			—N/a			
	4×400 m relay	—N/a					

Field events
Men

Athlete	Event	Heat		Final	
Athlete	Event	Result	Rank	Result	Rank
Junior Phillip Numake	Long jump				
Junior Phillip Numake	Triple jump				
Jack Nasawa	Javelin throw				

Women

Athlete	Event	Heat		Final	
Athlete	Event	Result	Rank	Result	Rank
Lyza Malres	Long jump				
Lyza Malres	Triple jump				

=== Para-athletics ===
Men

Athlete	Event	Heat		Semifinal		Final	
Athlete	Event	Result	Rank	Result	Rank	Result	Rank
Georges Langa	100 m ambulant						
Rodney Talo	100 m ambulant						
Rodney Ben	100 m wheelchair						
Rodney Ben	Shot put secured throw						
Ken Kahu	Shot put ambulant						
Daniel Matal	Shot put ambulant						

Women

Athlete	Event	Heat		Semifinal		Final	
Athlete	Event	Result	Rank	Result	Rank	Result	Rank
Elie Enock	Shot put secured throw						

== Field hockey ==
Summary

Team	Event	Round-robin						Semifinal	Final	
Team	Event	Opposition Score	Opposition Score	Opposition Score	Opposition Score	Opposition Score	Rank	Opposition Score	Opposition Score	Rank
Vanuatu men's	Men's tournament									
Vanuatu women's	Women's tournament									

=== Men's tournament ===
Team roster

- Men's team event – one team of 9 players

=== Women's tournament ===
Team roster

- Women's team event – one team of 9 players

== Football ==
Summary

Team	Event	Group Stage			Semifinal	Final	
Team	Event	Opposition Score	Opposition Score	Rank	Opposition Score	Opposition Score	Rank
Vanuatu men's	Men's	Tuvalu; W 6-0	Papua New Guinea; D 1-1	1	New Caledonia; L 0-1	Did not qualify	4
Vanuatu women's	Women's	Solomon Islands; L 0-1	Fiji; L 2-3	3	Did not qualify	Did not qualify	5

=== Men's tournament ===
Team roster

Takaro named his 23-man squad on 24 October 2023.

Head coach: TBD

No.	Pos.	Player	Date of birth (age)	Caps	Goals	Club
	GK	Massing Kalotang	26 August 2002 (aged 21)	7	0	(Vanuatu Football Federation) Yatel
	GK	Andreas Duch	12 October 1998 (aged 25)	0	0	(Vanuatu Football Federation) Ifira Black Bird
	DF	Tasso Jeffrey	12 August 1998 (aged 25)	1	0	(Football Australia) Gawler Eagles
	DF	Timothy Boulet	29 November 1998 (aged 24)	6	0	(New Zealand Football) Auckland City
	DF	Zidane Maguekon	3 June 2000 (aged 23)	0	0	(Vanuatu Football Federation) Vaum United
	DF	Michel Coulon	3 December 1995 (aged 27)	12	1	(Vanuatu Football Federation) Yatel
	DF	Brian Kaltak	30 September 1993 (aged 30)	20	5	(Football Australia) Central Coast Mariners
	DF	Jesse Kalopong	1 January 1998 (aged 25)	1	0	(Vanuatu Football Federation) Erakor Golden Star
	MF	John Alick	25 April 1991 (aged 32)	12	0	(Solomon Islands Football Federation) Solomon Warriors
	MF	Raoul Coulon	3 December 1995 (aged 27)	3	0	(Vanuatu Football Federation) Yatel
	MF	Barry Mansale	1 November 1995 (aged 28)	4	0	(Vanuatu Football Federation) Yatel
	MF	Claude Aru	25 April 1997 (aged 26)	6	1	(Vanuatu Football Federation) North Efate United
	MF	Joe Moses	22 May 2002 (aged 21)	1	0	(Vanuatu Football Federation) ABM Galaxy
	MF	Jean Taussi	17 July 1996 (aged 27)	3	0	(Vanuatu Football Federation) Ifira Black Bird
	MF	John Wohale	9 July 1997 (aged 26)	2	0	(Vanuatu Football Federation) Ifira Black Bird
	MF	Bong Kalo	18 January 1997 (aged 26)	20	1	(Vanuatu Football Federation) ABM Galaxy
	MF	Mitch Cooper	18 September 1994 (aged 29)	6	5	(Football Australia) Hume City
	MF	Jonathan Spokeyjack	13 November 1998 (aged 25)	3	0	(Vanuatu Football Federation) Ifira Black Bird
	FW	Alex Saniel	8 November 1996 (aged 27)	13	1	(Fiji Football Association) Suva
	FW	Azariah Soromon	1 March 1999 (aged 24)	17	7	(Fiji Football Association) Suva
	FW	Jordy Tasip	14 July 2000 (aged 23)	0	0	(New Zealand Football) Auckland City
	FW	Godine Tenene	3 May 1998 (aged 25)	5	0	(Vanuatu Football Federation) Ifira Black Bird
	FW	Kensi Tangis	20 January 1990 (aged 33)	29	8	(Vanuatu Football Federation) ABM Galaxy

=== Women's tournament ===
Team roster

- Women's team event – one team of 23 players

== Judo ==
VASANOC have selected 5 judokas for the Games.

Athlete	Event	Round of 32	Round of 16	Quarterfinals	Semifinals	Repechage	Final / GM	
Athlete	Event	Opposition Result	Opposition Result	Opposition Result	Opposition Result	Opposition Result	Opposition Result	Rank
Alan Monthouel	Men's -60 kg							
Maxence Cugola	Men's -66 kg							
Anna Bumseng	Women's -48 kg							
Veronica Tari	Women's -48 kg							
Prisicillia Monthouel	Women's -52 kg							

== Rugby league nines ==
VASANOC have confirmed participation in both the men's and women's rugby league nines. Marking this Games as their debut competition.

Summary

Team	Event	Preliminary round				Semifinal	Final	
Team	Event	Opposition Score	Opposition Score	Opposition Score	Rank	Opposition Score	Opposition Score	Rank
Vanuatu men's	Men's							
Vanuatu women's	Women's							

=== Men's tournament ===
Team roster

- Men's team event – one team of 16 players

=== Women's tournament ===
Vanuatu Rugby League announced its first ever women's rugby league team, thirteens or nines, to debut at these Games. The squad was announced on

Team roster

- Dahlia Sese
- Diana Boar
- Emmanuella Nguyen
- Ericka Rono
- Grace Bebe
- Jaimeen Kenni
- Joana Kaluatman
- Lavinia Qwari
- Louise Obed
- Majory Thompson
- Melta Cyrus
- So’oletaua Motuliki
- Stephanie Kalfen
- Teau Nawalu
- Winona Kalpukai
- Yvanka Kalfen

== Volleyball ==
=== Beach ===
Vanuatu Volleyball Federation (VVF) will enter one men's and one women's pair. The men's pair is yet to be announced.

Athlete	Event	Preliminary round				Quarterfinals	Semifinals	Final / GM	
Athlete	Event	Opposition Score	Opposition Score	Opposition Score	Rank	Opposition Score	Opposition Score	Opposition Score	Rank
	Men's	–	–	–		–	–	–	
Sherysyn Toko; Majabelle Lawac	Women's	–	–	–		–	–	–	

=== Indoor ===
Men's tournament

Team roster

- Men's team event – one team of 14 players

== Weightlifting ==
VASANOC selected two weightlifters for the 2023 Games.

Athlete	Event	Snatch	Rank	Clean & jerk	Rank	Total	Rank
Thomas Wilbur	Men's –102 kg						
Ajah Pritchard Lolo	Women's –87 kg						
