= Peter Boukouvalas =

Australian archer (born 1998)

Personal information
- Nationality: Australia
- Born: 2 December 1998 (age 27) Liverpool, NSW
- Home town: Georges Hall
- Occupation(s): Customer Service Attendant, Professional Archer

Sport
- Country: Australia
- Sport: Archery
- Rank: 67
- Club: Sydney Olympic Park Archers
- Coached by: Alex King

Achievements and titles
- Highest world ranking: 44
- Personal best: 680
Medal record
Archery
Representing Australia
Pacific Games
Silver medal – second place	2023 Pacific Games	Archery Recurve – Single 720 Round 70m Male
Silver medal – second place	2023 Pacific Games	Archery Recurve – Match Play Male
- Updated on 1 August 2024

Peter Boukouvalas (born 2 December 1998) is an Australian archer. He represented Australia in the 2024 Summer Olympic Games. He is currently ranked 68th in the world.

== Personal life ==
Boukouvalas discovered archery after he watched the 2004 Olympic Games on TV, but didn't begin his career in Archery until 2016 because of his commitments with competitive swimming. He trained with his coach Alex King in the Sydney Olympic Park Archery Centre. He is of Greek origin. Boukouvalas works as Station Master at St Peters railway station.

== Career ==
In 2018, Boukouvalas competed in the 2018 Asia Cup Stage 3, where he placed 17th. He won gold in the 2021 Australian Open. In 2022, he competed in stages one and three of the Archery world cup, placing 65th in both. In 2023, he competed in the Archery World Championships, placing 33rd, and Stages one, two and four, of the Archery world cup, finishing 65th, 17th and 33rd respectively. He also competed in the 2023 Pacific Games, winning silver for both the Archery Recurve –Single 720 Round 70m Male and Archery Recurve – Match Play Male events. In 2024, Peter again competed in the Archery world cup stages one and two, placing 33rd in both.

In 2024, Boukouvalas was selected to represent Australia in the 2024 Paris Olympics in the Archery team. He placed 60th in the Men's Individual ranking round, and placed =33rd overall, after being beaten 6-0 by Wooseok Lee in the Men's Individual 1/32 Elimination Round.
