= New Caledonia at the 2023 Pacific Games =

- Flag of New Caledonia
- IOC code: NCL
- National federation: Comité Territorial Olympique et Sportif de Nouvelle-Calédonie

in Honiara, Solomon Islands 19 November 2023 – 2 December 2023
- Competitors: 285 (167 men and 118 women) in 19 sports
- Flag bearer: Armonie Konhu
- Medals Ranked 1st: Gold 82 Silver 57 Bronze 58 Total 197

Pacific Games appearances
- 1963; 1966; 1969; 1971; 1975; 1979; 1983; 1987; 1991; 1995; 1999; 2003; 2007; 2011; 2015; 2019; 2023

New Caledonia competed at the 2023 Pacific Games in Honiara, Solomon Islands from 19 November to 2 December 2023. New Caledonian athletes have appeared at every edition of the Pacific Games since the inaugural games in 1963.

== Competitors ==
The following is the list of number of competitors in the Games.

Sport	Men	Women	Total
Archery	5	4	9
Athletics	23	16	38
Basketball	16	4	20
Bodybuilding	2	2	4
Boxing	6	2	8
Football	21	21	42
Golf	4	4	8
Judo	12	5	17
Karate	13	7	20
Powerlifting	3	1	4
Sailing	4	2	6
Swimming	8	8	16
Table tennis	6	5	11
Taekwondo	3	1	4
Tennis	3	2	5
Triathlon	3	3	6
Va'a	15	13	28
Volleyball	16	14	30
Weightlifting	4	4	8
Total	167	118	285

== Basketball ==
=== 5×5 basketball ===
Summary

Team	Event	Preliminary round				Qualifying finals	Semifinals	Final / GM	
Team	Event	Opposition Score	Opposition Score	Opposition Score	Rank	Opposition Score	Opposition Score	Opposition Score	Rank
New Caledonia men's	Men's tournament	Tonga; L 80–82	Tahiti; 50–53 W	Fiji; L 66–68	3rd	Papua New Guinea; 78–87 W	Fiji; L 71–60		

==== Men's tournament ====
New Caledonia national basketball team qualified for the Pacific Games by securing one of two berths after winning gold at the 2022 FIBA Melanesia Basketball Cup in Suva.

Team roster

- Men's team event – one team of 12 players

=== 3×3 basketball ===
Summary

Team	Event	Preliminary round						Semifinals	Final / GM	
Team	Event	Opposition Score	Opposition Score	Opposition Score	Opposition Score	Opposition Score	Rank	Opposition Score	Opposition Score	Rank
New Caledonia men's	Men's tournament	Solomon Islands –	Marshall Islands –	Papua New Guinea –	American Samoa –	Samoa –				
New Caledonia women's	Women's tournament	Tonga –	Guam –	Papua New Guinea –	French Polynesia –	—N/a				

== Football ==
Summary

Team	Event	Preliminary round				Semifinal	Final	
Team	Event	Opposition Score	Opposition Score	Opposition Score	Rank	Opposition Score	Opposition Score	Rank
New Caledonia men's	Men's	Tonga	Cook Islands	—N/a				
New Caledonia women's	Women's	Cook Islands	American Samoa	Papua New Guinea				

=== Men's tournament ===
Team roster

Head coach: (France) Johann Sidaner

Sidaner named his 21-man squad on 15 November 2023

No.	Pos.	Player	Date of birth (age)	Caps	Goals	Club
1	GK	Rocky Nyikeine	26 May 1992 (aged 31)	23	0	(New Caledonian Football Federation) Hienghène Sport
2	DF	Gabriel Vakoume	9 February 1989 (aged 34)	3	0	(New Caledonian Football Federation) Kunié
3	DF	William Rokaud	3 October 2001 (aged 22)	3	1	(New Caledonian Football Federation) Magenta
4	DF	Vincent Vakié	20 October 1990 (aged 33)	4	0	(New Caledonian Football Federation) Kunié
5	MF	Fonzy Ranchain	22 July 1994 (aged 29)	2	0	(New Caledonian Football Federation) Hienghène Sport
6	DF	Martin Makam	15 September 2001 (aged 22)	2	0	(New Caledonian Football Federation) Magenta
7	MF	Morgan Mathelon	12 September 1991 (aged 32)	7	0	(New Caledonian Football Federation) Tiga Sport
8	MF	Pierre Bako	9 August 2001 (aged 22)	6	1	(New Caledonian Football Federation) Gaïtcha
9	FW	Lues Waya	1 August 2001 (aged 22)	1	0	(French Football Federation) USSA Vertou
10	MF	Willy Read	11 January 2003 (aged 20)	3	1	(New Caledonian Football Federation) Lössi
11	MF	César Zeoula	29 August 1989 (aged 34)	35	10	(French Football Federation) US Chauvigny
12	MF	Shene Wélépane	9 December 1997 (aged 25)	13	4	(New Caledonian Football Federation) Tiga Sport
13	DF	Josué Welepane	19 April 2000 (aged 23)	1	0	(New Caledonian Football Federation) Tiga Sport
14	FW	Titouan Richard	4 December 2000 (aged 22)	1	0	(French Football Federation) Olympique Salaise Rhodia
15	MF	Gérard Waia	22 December 2004 (aged 18)	1	1	(New Caledonian Football Federation) Tiga Sport
16	GK	Mickaël Ulile	16 July 1997 (aged 26)	11	0	(New Caledonian Football Federation) Magenta
17	MF	Jean-Jacques Katrawa	2 August 1999 (aged 24)	3	0	(New Caledonian Football Federation) Gaïtcha
18	MF	Ritchi Iwa	31 August 1999 (aged 24)	3	0	(New Caledonian Football Federation) Païta
20	MF	Makalu Xowi	20 April 1999 (aged 24)	4	3	(Tahitian Football Federation) Central Sport
21	MF	Robert Neoere	18 April 1996 (aged 27)	3	0	(New Caledonian Football Federation) Kunié
23	DF	Gianni Manmieu		2	0	(New Caledonian Football Federation) Kunié

=== Women's tournament ===
Team roster

- Women's team event – One team of 21 players

== Judo ==
New Caledonia will enter a team of 16 judokas (12 men and 4 women).

Men

Athlete	Event	Round of 32	Round of 16	Quarterfinals	Semifinals	Repechage	Final / GM	
Athlete	Event	Opposition Result	Opposition Result	Opposition Result	Opposition Result	Opposition Result	Opposition Result	Rank
Matteo Lepauvre	-60 kg							
Antoine Deprez	-60 kg							
Maxime Taramarcaz	-66 kg							
Pierrick Idmont	-66 kg							
Cedric Jaszczyszyn	-73 kg							
Antoine Marcuzzo	-73 kg							
Jason Apavou	-81 kg							
Paulo Taukafauli	-81 kg							
Vincent Neris	-90 kg							
Maasi Falevalu	-90 kg							
Ponove Falevalu	-100 kg							
Teva Gouriou	+100 kg							

Women

Athlete	Event	Round of 32	Round of 16	Quarterfinals	Semifinals	Repechage	Final / GM	
Athlete	Event	Opposition Result	Opposition Result	Opposition Result	Opposition Result	Opposition Result	Opposition Result	Rank
Joy Quemener	-52 kg							
Deborah Bocahut	-57 kg							
Anais Gopea	-70 kg							
Ashley Suta Dit Saponia	-70 kg							

== Swimming ==
=== Men's Swimming ===
Medal	Name	Event
Gold	Nathan Hudan	200 meter Freestyle
Gold	John-William Dabin	200 meter Backstroke
Gold	Alexandre Gane	100 meter Breaststroke
Gold	Ethan Dumesnil	50 meter Butterfly
Gold	Ethan Dumesnil	100 meter Butterfly
Gold	John-William Dabin	200 meter Individual Medley
Gold		100 meter Freestyle Relay
Gold		200 meter Freestyle Relay
Gold		100 meter Medley Relay
Silver	John-William Dabin	200 meter Freestyle
Silver	Baptiste Savignac	1500 meter Freestyle
Silver	Ethan Dumesnil	50 meter Backstroke
Silver	Ethan Dumesnil	100 meter Backstroke
Silver	Chrissander Cersa	200 meter Backstroke
Silver	Alexandre Gane	200 meter Breaststroke
Silver	Thibaut Mary	100 meter Butterfly
Silver	Alexandre Gane	200 meter Individual Medley
Silver	John-William Dabin	5 km Open Water
Bronze	John-William Dabin	400 meter Freestyle
Bronze	Chrissander Cersa	100 meter Backstroke
Bronze	Alexandre Gane	50 meter Breaststroke
Bronze	Thibaut Mary	50 meter Butterfly
Bronze	Baptiste Savignac	200 meter Butterfly
Bronze	Baptiste Savignac	400 meter Individual Medley

== Weightlifting ==
CTOS selected ten weightlifters (5 men, 5 women) for the 2023 Games.

Men

Athlete	Event	Snatch	Rank	Clean & jerk	Rank	Total	Rank
Mathieu Lao Yan	55 kg						
Mattéo Perraud	73 kg						
Sylvain Duclos	81 kg						
Jérémy Lancette	89 kg						
Kyle Michel	+109 kg						

Women

Athlete	Event	Snatch	Rank	Clean & jerk	Rank	Total	Rank
Prescillia Piotrowsky	55 kg						
Diane Dam Wan	59 kg						
Julia Paul	59 kg						
Jessica Idjan	64 kg						
Demy Dabin	71 kg						
