= 2023 Pacific Games =

17th edition of the Pacific Games

XVII Pacific Games
- Host city: Honiara
- Country: Solomon Islands
- Motto: Challenge, Celebrate, Unite
- Nations: 24
- Events: 342 in 24 sports
- Opening: 19 November 2023
- Closing: 2 December 2023
- Opened by: Manasseh Sogavare
- Athlete's Oath: Marx Boussougou; Lara Grangeon
- Website: sol2023.com.sb

The 2023 Pacific Games, officially known as the XVII Pacific Games and commonly known as Sol 2023 or Honiara 2023, was a continental multi-sport event for Oceania countries and territories held in Honiara, Solomon Islands between 19 November and 2 December 2023. This was the first time that the Solomon Islands have hosted the Pacific Games.

The Games were originally scheduled for 16–29 July 2023. However, in July 2021, the Games organizers requested a date change due to delays in preparation for the games caused by the COVID-19 pandemic in Solomon Islands.

New Caledonia topped the medal table by both total golds (82) and total medals (197), with Tahiti finishing second by both respects (57 and 160). Australia finished third, setting a record for the most gold medals and total medals ever won by its delegation at a Pacific Games with 50 and 84. Samoa finished fourth, with a total of 34 gold and 76 medals. Papua New Guinea rounded off the top five list with 29 gold medals and third in the overall medal count, with 105 medals. Host nation Solomon Islands won twelve gold medals and 78 medals, its best result at any Pacific Games, finishing in seventh place. The Marshall Islands won its first ever Pacific Games gold medals, a record five, all from weightlifting.

== Host selection ==
Two countries expressed interest and launched bids for the 17th games. Tahiti, French Polynesia, which hosted the event in 1971 and 1995, was the first to express their intentions in hosting the 2023 Games during the Pacific Games Council (PGC) General Assembly in Port Moresby in July 2015. The other bidder, the Solomon Islands, in 2016 expressed interest with Prime Minister Manasseh Sogavare launching the country's bid for a potential first time host of the quadrennial event. On 11 May 2016, during the PGC General Assembly in Port Vila, with the decision taken by the 22 members of the PGC awarded the hosting rights to the Solomon Islands. The margin of victory was reportedly a single vote.

2023 Pacific Games bidding results
City	PGA	Final Votes
Honiara	Solomon Islands	12
Pape'ete	Tahiti, French Polynesia	10

== Development and preparation ==
The 'Pacific Games 2023 Act 2017' created the National Hosting Authority (NHA) as the 2023 Pacific Games Hosting Authority to manage the duties of the committees created by the Act, including the Games Organizing Committee, Games Facilities Committee, and NHA Secretariat. The NHA's responsibility is to oversee the 2023 Pacific Games overall by making sure the Solomon Islands Pacific Games Association and the Government fulfill their obligations under the host contract and by managing the Games' financial planning and budgeting. This strives to ensure vital connection between public services, venues, and building. Additionally, NHA makes sure that the provisions of the Pacific Games 2023 Act (2017) are followed and upheld.

=== Security ===
Military and police personal from Australia, Fiji, Papua New Guinea, and New Zealand assisted the Royal Solomon Islands Police Force throughout the games.

== Venues ==
The games will take place in 11 venues spread across the host city of Honiara. The 2023 Pacific Games' sport venues are conveniently close to one another and can be reached in 5 to 30 minutes. The following venues have been confirmed:

- Aquatic Center (new) – Swimming
- DC Park (existing) – Archery, Sailing, Open water swimming, Touch rugby, Va’a/Outrigger canoeing
- Friendship Hall (new) – Basketball, Boxing, Netball, Volleyball
- HCC Sports Precinct (existing) – Table tennis
- Honiara Golf Club (existing) – Golf
- King George Hockey Turf (renovated) – Field hockey
- Lawson Tama Stadium (existing) – Football
- Maranatha Hall (existing) – Bodybuilding, Powerlifting, Weightlifting
- National Stadium (Solomon Islands)/Main Stadium (new) – Opening Ceremony, Closing Ceremony, Athletics, Football, Rugby league 9s, Rugby 7s
- National Tennis Center (renovated) – Tennis
- SIFF Academy (existing) – 3x3 Basketball, Beach volleyball, Karate, Judo
  - SIFF Academy (Field 1 & 2) – Football

== Participating nations ==
24 countries and territories participated: the 22 Pacific Games Associations (PGA), and two Associate members - New Zealand, and Australia.

- American Samoa (189)
- Australia (75)
- Cook Islands (103)
- Federated States of Micronesia (4)
- Fiji (592)
- Guam (49)
- Kiribati (111)
- Marshall Islands (8)
- Nauru (100)
- New Caledonia (285)
- New Zealand (46)
- Niue (47)
- Norfolk Island (30)
- Northern Mariana Islands (92)
- Palau (23)
- Papua New Guinea (382)
- Samoa (112)
- Solomon Islands (601) (Host)
- Tahiti (223)
- Tokelau (1)
- Tonga (58)
- Tuvalu (81)
- Vanuatu (158)
- Wallis and Futuna (63)

== Sports ==
As amended in the Pacific Games charter on 14 July 2019, in Apia, Samoa, the programme of the Pacific Games shall consist of 17 mandatory sports and 7 optionals who have to reflect the local interests. The following sports are scheduled for the games:

- Archery (11)
- Athletics (54)
- Basketball
  - Basketball (2)
  - 3x3 basketball (2)
- Bodybuilding (15)
- Boxing (12)
- Field hockey (2)
- Football (2)
- Golf (4)
- Judo (17)
- Karate (17)
- Netball (1)
- Outrigger canoeing
  - Va'a (12)
  - Kayak (8)
- Powerlifting (16)
- Rugby league nines (2)
- Rugby sevens (2)
- Sailing (9)
- Swimming (43)
- Table tennis (11)
- Taekwondo (18)
- Tennis (7)
- Touch rugby (3)
- Triathlon (6)
- Volleyball
  - Volleyball (2)
  - Beach volleyball (2)
- Weightlifting (60)

== Calendar ==
The 2023 schedule by session was released by the Games Organizing Committee on 19 June 2023.

Daily medal events for all sports are yet to be confirmed.

All dates are Solomon Islands Time (GMT+11)

OC	Opening ceremony	●	Event competitions	1	Gold medal events	CC	Closing ceremony

November/December 2023		November														December		Events
November/December 2023		17 Fri	18 Sat	19 Sun	20 Mon	21 Tue	22 Wed	23 Thu	24 Fri	25 Sat	26 Sun	27 Mon	28 Tue	29 Wed	30 Thu	1 Fri	2 Sat	Events
Ceremonies				OC													CC	
Archery						4		●	7									11
Athletics												7	10	10	12	13	2	54
Basketball	Basketball	●	●		●	●	●	●	●	2								2
Basketball	3×3 Basketball													●	●	●	2	2
Bodybuilding												15						15
Boxing													●		●	4	9	13
Field hockey													●	●	●	2		2
Football		●	●		●	●		●	●			●	●		●	1	1	2
Golf							●	●	●	4								4
Judo					10	7												17
Karate								11	6									17
Netball												●	●	●	●	●	1	1
Outrigger canoeing												4	6	4	4	2		20
Powerlifting													8	4	4			16
Rugby league nines					●	●	2											2
Rugby sevens								●	●	2								2
Sailing					●	●	●	●	●	5		●	●	●	●	●	4	9
Swimming					8	8	8	8	8	3								43
Table tennis					●	●	4	●	1	8								13
Taekwondo													9	9				18
Tennis		●	●		●	2	●	●	●	●		●	●	1	4			7
Touch rugby												●	●	2	●	●	1	3
Triathlon														●	2	4		6
Volleyball	Indoor volleyball	●	●		●	●	●	●	●	2								2
Volleyball	Beach volleyball												●	●	●	●	2	2
Weightlifting					15	12	12	12	9									60
Total events					33	33	26	31	31	26		26	33	30	26	26	22	343
Cumulative total					33	66	92	123	154	180		206	239	269	295	321	343	343
November/December		Fri 17	Sat 18	Sun 19	Mon 20	Tue 21	Wed 22	Thu 23	Fri 24	Sat 25	Sun 26	Mon 27	Tue 28	Wed 29	Thu 30	Fri 1	Sat 2	Events

== Medal table ==
* Host nation (Solomon Islands)

2023 Pacific Games medal table
Rank	Nation	Gold	Silver	Bronze	Total
1	New Caledonia	82	57	58	197
2	Tahiti	57	51	51	159
3	Australia	50	24	10	84
4	Samoa	34	23	19	76
5	Papua New Guinea	29	37	39	105
6	Fiji	21	31	41	93
7	Solomon Islands*	12	38	29	79
8	New Zealand	10	12	12	34
9	Nauru	9	12	7	28
10	Guam	7	4	6	17
11	Cook Islands	5	3	10	18
12	Marshall Islands	5	3	2	10
13	Northern Mariana Islands	5	1	6	12
14	Kiribati	4	1	6	11
15	Wallis and Futuna	3	6	6	15
16	Vanuatu	3	5	11	19
17	Federated States of Micronesia	3	1	0	4
18	Tonga	2	8	9	19
19	Niue	1	0	1	2
20	Tuvalu	0	5	0	5
21	American Samoa	0	3	3	6
22	Palau	0	0	3	3
23	Norfolk Island	0	0	1	1
24	Tokelau	0	0	0	0
Totals (24 entries)		342	325	330	997

== Ceremonies ==
=== Opening ceremony ===
The opening ceremony of the 2023 Pacific Games took place on Sunday, 19 November 2023, at the Solomon Islands National Stadium in Honiara, Solomon Islands.

=== Closing ceremony ===
The closing ceremony was held on 2 December 2023, in Solomon Islands National Stadium.

== Controversies ==
=== Doping ===
In December 2024, the Pacific Games Council confirmed two positive doping tests. Nauru's Mahaasin Daoe failed a doping test and was stripped of a gold medal in the men's 66 kg powerlifting. In the men's shot put, Tahiti's Tumatai Dauphin was stripped from a silver medal after initially placing second. Medals for both events were reallocated respectively.

== See also ==
- 2022 Asian Games
