= Tahiti at the 2023 Pacific Games =

- IOC code: TAH
- National federation: Comité Olympique de Polynésie Française

19 November 2023 – 2 December 2023
- Competitors: 153 (86 men and 67 women) in 6 sports
- Medals Ranked 2nd: Gold 57 Silver 53 Bronze 50 Total 160

Pacific Games appearances
- 1963; 1966; 1969; 1971; 1975; 1979; 1983; 1987; 1991; 1995; 1999; 2003; 2007; 2011; 2015; 2019; 2023

Tahiti competed at the 2023 Pacific Games in Honiara from 19 November to 2 December 2023. Tahitian athletes have appeared at every edition of the Pacific Games since the inaugural games in 1963.

== Competitors ==
The following is the list of number of competitors in the Games.

Sport	Men	Women	Total
Athletics	15	15	30
Basketball	16	16	32
Football	22	22	44
Judo	13	9	22
Rugby sevens	12	0	12
Weightlifting	8	5	13
Total	86	67	153

== Athletics ==
Fédération d'athlétisme de Polynésie française announced a 30 member roster (15 men and 15 women) for the 2023 Games which also include one male para-athlete. Tahiti's sole gold medalist from Apia 2019 in the men's 5000 metres, Samuel Aragaw, will not be on the team to defend his title. However, the Tahitian team will feature 2015 Pacific Games long jump champion, Raihau Maiau, who was absent from the games in 2019.

Key

- Note–Ranks given for track events are within the athlete's heat only
- Q = Qualified for the next round
- q = Qualified for the next round as a fastest loser or, in field events, by position without achieving the qualifying target
- qR = Qualified to the next round by referee judgement
- NR = National record
- N/A = Round not applicable for the event
- Bye = Athlete not required to compete in round

Track and road events
Men

Athlete	Event	Heat		Semifinal		Final	
Athlete	Event	Result	Rank	Result	Rank	Result	Rank
Raihau Maiau	100 m						
Manuihei Teaha	100 m						
Paul Chouteau	800 m						
Paul Chouteau	5000 m						
Paul Chouteau	10000 m						
Paul Chouteau	3000 m steeplechase						
Felice Covillon	800 m						
Felice Covillon	3000 m steeplechase						
Damien Troquenet	5000 m						
Damien Troquenet	10000 m						
Damien Troquenet	Half marathon						
Benjamin Zorgnotti	5000 m						
Benjamin Zorgnotti	10000 m						
Benjamin Zorgnotti	Half marathon						
Timona Poareu	110 m hurdles						
Pole-Elie Raoult	400 m hurdles						
	4×100 m relay	—N/a					
	4×400 m relay	—N/a					

Women

Athlete	Event	Heat		Semifinal		Final	
Athlete	Event	Result	Rank	Result	Rank	Result	Rank
Hereiti Bernardino	200 m						
Hereiti Bernardino	400 m						
Hereiti Bernardino	400 m hurdles						
Estelle Gentilly	200 m						
Estelle Gentilly	400 m						
Estelle Gentilly	800 m						
Estelle Gentilly	1500 m						
Mihivai Atrewe	400 m						
Mihivai Atrewe	400 m hurdles						
Teanavai Perez	400 m						
Angèle Richard	800 m						
Angèle Richard	1500 m						
Amandine Matera	800 m						
Amandine Matera	1500 m						
Amandine Matera	5000 m						
Amandine Matera	3000 m steeplechase						
Lauriane Bisch	5000 m						
Lauriane Bisch	10000 m						
Lauriane Bisch	Half marathon						
Sophie Bouchonnet	5000 m						
Sophie Bouchonnet	10000 m						
Sophie Bouchonnet	Half marathon						
Salomé De Barthez	5000 m						
Salomé De Barthez	10000 m						
Salomé De Barthez	Half marathon						
Clémence Dede	5000 m						
Clémence Dede	10000 m						
Clémence Dede	Half marathon						
Pauline Moreau	5000 m						
Pauline Moreau	10000 m						
Pauline Moreau	Half marathon						
Timeri Lamorelle	100 m hurdles						
Kiara Gilroy	100 m hurdles						
Kiara Gilroy	400 m hurdles						
	4×100 m relay	—N/a					
	4×400 m relay	—N/a					

Field events
Men

Athlete	Event	Heat		Final	
Athlete	Event	Distance	Position	Distance	Position
Kilian Lidec-Potateuatahi	High jump				
Kilian Lidec-Potateuatahi	Javelin throw				
Manuihei Teaha	High jump				
Mathéo Lada	Pole vault				
Kevin Maroaunui	Pole vault				
Timona Poareu	Pole vault				
Timona Poareu	Long jump				
Raihau Maiau	Long jump				
Teaiki Lenoir	Triple jump				
Tumatai Dauphin	Shot put				
Maitoa Pito	Discus throw				
Maitoa Pito	Hammer throw				

Women

Athlete	Event	Heat		Final	
Athlete	Event	Distance	Position	Distance	Position
Teanavai Perez	High jump				
Tess Ayat	Pole vault				
Timeri Lamorelle	Long jump				
Loveleina Wong-Sang	Shot put				
Loveleina Wong-Sang	Discus throw				

Combined events – Men's decathlon

Athlete	Event	100 m	LJ	SP	HJ	400 m	110H	DT	PV	JT	1500 m	Final	Rank
Timona Poareu	Result												
Timona Poareu	Points												

Combined events – Women's heptathlon

Athlete	Event	100H	HJ	SP	200 m	LJ	JT	800 m	Final	Rank
Teanavai Perez	Result									
Teanavai Perez	Points									

=== Para-athletics ===
Men

Athlete	Event	Heat		Final	
Athlete	Event	Result	Rank	Result	Rank
Christian Chee Ayee	100 m wheelchair				
Christian Chee Ayee	Shot put secured throw				

== Basketball ==
=== 5×5 basketball ===
Summary

Team	Event	Preliminary round				Qualifying finals	Semifinals	Final / GM	
Team	Event	Opposition Score	Opposition Score	Opposition Score	Rank	Opposition Score	Opposition Score	Opposition Score	Rank
Tahiti Men's	Men's	Fiji –	New Caledonia –	Tonga –					
Tahiti Women's	Women's	Papua New Guinea –	New Caledonia –	Cook Islands –					

==== Men's tournament ====
Tahiti national basketball team qualified for the Pacific Games by securing one of two berths after winning gold at the 2022 FIBA Polynesia Basketball Cup in Kaitaia, New Zealand.

Team roster

- Men's team event – one team of 12 players

==== Women's tournament ====
Tahiti women's national basketball team have received a wildcard entry for the Pacific Games from FIBA Oceania.

Team roster

- Women's team event – one team of 12 players

== Football ==
Summary

Team	Event	Preliminary round				Semifinal	Final	
Team	Event	Opposition Score	Opposition Score	Opposition Score	Rank	Opposition Score	Opposition Score	Rank
Tahiti men's	Men's	Northern Mariana Islands	Fiji	—N/a				
Tahiti women's	Women's	Samoa	Tonga	—N/a				

=== Men's tournament ===
Team roster

Head coach: (French Polynesia) Samuel Garcia

Tahiti's 22-man squad was announced on 7 November 2023.

No.	Pos.	Player	Date of birth (age)	Caps	Goals	Club
	GK	Moana Pito	25 January 2000 (aged 23)	2	0	(Tahitian Football Federation) Tefana
	GK	Tevaearai Tamatai	15 January 2001 (aged 22)	0	0	(Tahitian Football Federation) Vénus
	GK	Teave Teamotuaitau	17 April 1992 (aged 31)	11	0	(Tahitian Football Federation) Vénus
	DF	Marama Amau	13 January 1991 (aged 32)	10	0	(Tahitian Football Federation) Vénus
	DF	Mauri Heitaa	31 July 1999 (aged 24)	1	0	(Tahitian Football Federation) Vénus
	DF	Terai Bremond	16 May 2001 (aged 22)	4	0	(Tahitian Football Federation) Vénus
	DF	Keanu Vernaudon	18 October 2002 (aged 21)	0	0	(Tahitian Football Federation) Tefana
	DF	François Hapipi	10 March 1999 (aged 24)	4	0	(Tahitian Football Federation) Tefana
	DF	Téva Lossec	3 December 2002 (aged 20)	0	0	(United States Soccer Federation) Campbell Fighting Camels
	MF	Honoura Maraetefau	27 July 2002 (aged 21)	4	0	(Tahitian Football Federation) Tefana
	MF	Kavai'ei Morgant	8 October 2001 (aged 22)	3	1	(Tahitian Football Federation) Tefana
	MF	Eddy Kaspard	27 May 2001 (aged 22)	4	2	(Tahitian Football Federation) Tefana
	MF	Frank Papaura	6 April 2005 (aged 18)	1	0	(Tahitian Football Federation) Pueu
	MF	Tauhiti Keck	1 August 1994 (aged 29)	10	6	(Tahitian Football Federation) Vénus
	MF	Roonui Tehau	15 December 1999 (aged 23)	6	1	(Tahitian Football Federation) Vénus
	MF	Paolo Haussner	21 February 2002 (aged 21)	0	0	(French Football Federation) FCM Troyes
	MF	Matéo Degrumelle	22 August 2003 (aged 20)	0	0	(French Football Federation) Le Havre B
	FW	Teaonui Tehau	1 September 1992 (aged 31)	36	24	(Tahitian Football Federation) Vénus
	FW	Manuarii Shan	23 February 2004 (aged 19)	1	0	(Tahitian Football Federation) Vénus
	FW	Roonui Tinirauarii	14 March 1997 (aged 26)	3	2	(Tahitian Football Federation) Dragon
	FW	Tauatua Lucas	23 November 1994 (aged 28)	0	2	(Tahitian Football Federation) Tefana
	FW	Raimana Tetuanui	1 January 1994 (aged 29)	2	0	(Tahitian Football Federation) Pueu

=== Women's tournament ===
Team roster

- Women's team event – One team of 22 players

== Judo ==
The Polynesian Judo Federation has selected a team of 22 judokas (13 men and 9 women) on 12 January, 2023.

Men

Athlete	Event	Round of 32	Round of 16	Quarterfinals	Semifinals	Repechage	Final / GM	
Athlete	Event	Opposition Result	Opposition Result	Opposition Result	Opposition Result	Opposition Result	Opposition Result	Rank
Tamaterai Herve	-60 kg							
Anthony Kaan	-60 kg							
Manatoa Luciani	-66 kg							
Gaston Lafon	-73 kg							
Noa Gustin	-73 kg							
Toanui Lucas	-81 kg							
Vydal Samin	-81 kg							
David Chevalier	-90 kg							
Maevarau Le Gayic	-90 kg							
Evan Jolif	-100 kg							
Julien Ragusa	-100 kg							
Jeremy Picard	+100 kg							
Samasona Tevaearai	+100 kg							

Women

Athlete	Event	Round of 32	Round of 16	Quarterfinals	Semifinals	Repechage	Final / GM	
Athlete	Event	Opposition Result	Opposition Result	Opposition Result	Opposition Result	Opposition Result	Opposition Result	Rank
Ambre Popoff	-48 kg							
Ynes Balcon Mouzaoui	-48 kg							
Poeiti Gohlen	-52 kg							
Ramahere Deflandre	-52 kg							
Laetitia Wuillmet	-57 kg							
Teramatuatini Bopp	-63 kg							
Teipoteani Tevenino	-63 kg							
Imihia Teumere	-70 kg							
Haukea Vitielli	-70 kg							

== Rugby sevens ==
Summary

Team	Event	Pool round				Quarterfinal	Semifinal	Final / BM	
Team	Event	Opposition Result	Opposition Result	Opposition Result	Rank	Opposition Result	Opposition Result	Opposition Result	Rank
Tahiti men's	Men's tournament	Solomon Islands	Papua New Guinea	Wallis and Futuna					

=== Men's tournament ===
Team roster

- Men's team event – one team of 12 players

== Weightlifting ==
COPF selected thirteen weightlifters (8 men, 5 women) for the 2023 Games.

Men

Athlete	Event	Snatch	Rank	Clean & jerk	Rank	Total	Rank
Tutearii Ebbs	81 kg						
Arnaud Sicot	81 kg						
Matahi Tahiaipuoho	89 kg						
Konotu Gatien	89 kg						
Steven Tehihira	96 kg						
Tahiri Metua	102 kg						
Tefatanui Metua	109 kg						
Kutea Utia	+109 kg						

Women

Athlete	Event	Snatch	Rank	Clean & jerk	Rank	Total	Rank
Vanina Teheipuarii	64 kg						
Storm Wolff	71 kg						
Tapeta Mai	71 kg						
Faahei Vaiauri	76 kg						
Zéphrine Tinirau	81 kg						
