= List of flag bearers for the Federated States of Micronesia at the Olympics =

Federated States of Micronesia at the Olympics
- Flag of the Federated States of Micronesia
- IOC code: FSM
- NOC: Federated States of Micronesia Olympic Committee
- Website: www.oceaniasport.com/fsm
- Medals: Gold 0 Silver 0 Bronze 0 Total 0

Summer appearances
- 2000; 2004; 2008; 2012; 2016; 2020; 2024

This is a list of flag bearers who have represented the Federated States of Micronesia at the Olympics.

Flag bearers carry the national flag of their country at the opening ceremony of the Olympic Games.

#	Event year	Season	Flag bearer	Sport
1	2000 Sydney	Summer	Manuel Minginfel	Weightlifting
2	2004 Athens	Summer	Manuel Minginfel	Weightlifting
3	2008 Beijing	Summer	Manuel Minginfel	Weightlifting
4	2012 London	Summer	Manuel Minginfel	Weightlifting
5	2016 Rio de Janeiro	Summer	Jennifer Chieng	Boxing
6	2020 Tokyo	Summer	Taeyanna Adams	Swimming
6	2020 Tokyo	Summer	Scott Fiti	Athletics
7	2024 Paris	Summer	Kestra Kihleng	Swimming
7	2024 Paris	Summer	Tasi Limtiaco	Swimming

== See also ==
- Federated States of Micronesia at the Olympics
