= Federated States of Micronesia at the 2025 World Aquatics Championships =

- Flag of Federated States of Micronesia
- World Aquatics code: FSM
- National federation: Federated States of Micronesia Swimming Association

in Singapore
- Competitors: 2 in 1 sport
- Medals: Gold 0 Silver 0 Bronze 0 Total 0

World Aquatics Championships appearances
- 2003; 2005; 2007; 2009; 2011; 2013; 2015; 2017; 2019; 2022; 2023; 2024; 2025

Federated States of Micronesia is competing at the 2025 World Aquatics Championships in Singapore from 11 July to 3 August 2025.

== Competitors ==
The following is the list of competitors in the Championships.

Sport	Men	Women	Total
Swimming	1	1	2
Total	1	1	2

== Swimming ==
Men

Athlete	Event	Heat		Semifinal		Final	
Athlete	Event	Time	Rank	Time	Rank	Time	Rank
Katerson Moya	100 m freestyle	55.44	90	Did not advance			
Katerson Moya	50 m butterfly	26.67	81	Did not advance			

Women

Athlete	Event	Heat		Semifinal		Final	
Athlete	Event	Time	Rank	Time	Rank	Time	Rank
Kestra Kihleng	100 m freestyle	1:03.30	69	Did not advance			
Kestra Kihleng	50 m butterfly	30.51	69	Did not advance			
