= Pacific Games Council =

Governing body of the Pacific Games

- Conseil des Jeux du Pacifique (French)
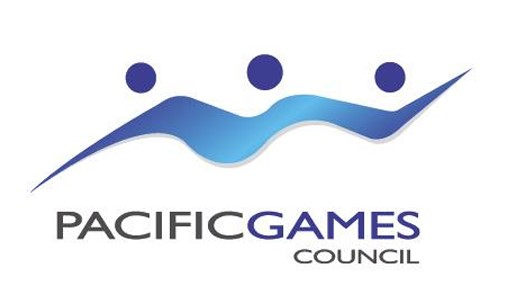
- Abbreviation: PGC (English), CJP (French)
- Formation: 1962; 64 years ago
- Founders: South Pacific Commission
- Type: Sports governing body
- Headquarters: Suva, Fiji
- Members: 22 active members, 2 associate members, 17 individual National Olympic Committees
- Official language: English, French (reference language), and the host country's language when necessary
- President: Vidhya Lakhan
- Vice Presidents: Marcus Stephen; Laurent Cassier; Tamzin Wardley
- Chief Executive Officer: Andrew Minogue
- Athletes' Representative: Ryan Pini

The Pacific Games Council (PGC; French: Conseil des Jeux du Pacifique, CJP) is the sports governing body for the Pacific Games, a multi-sport competition involving nations and territories across the Pacific region. The Council is responsible for managing and coordinating the Games, supporting the growth of sport throughout the Pacific, and promoting regional unity and cultural exchange through athletic competition.

In addition to the main event, the PGC administers the Pacific Mini Games, which are staged every four years between the main Games. It collaborates with national Olympic committees, governmental bodies, and sporting federations to enhance sports development and performance standards within the region.

== Structure ==
The Council is governed by:

- A General Assembly—the supreme decision‑making body, with one vote per member association.
- An Executive Board including the President and Vice‑Presidents overseeing sport, finance, marketing and athletes.
- Various technical and development committees.

The Council adheres to a constitution (its Charter), with Official languages of English and French.

== Member associations ==
Membership of the Council includes internationally recognised National Multisport Organisations within countries and territories who are members of the Pacific Community. There are currently 22 members, 15 of which are members of the International Olympic Committee (IOC). The Pitcairn Islands are the only Pacific Community member that is not a member of the Pacific Games Council, whereas Norfolk Island was admitted as a member of the Council despite not being a member of the Pacific Community.

In July 2014, the Oceania National Olympic Committees voted to allow Australia and New Zealand to take part in the 2015 Pacific Games. The risk of seeing the two wealthy, populous developed nations dominate the competition had previously prevented their inclusion. They were allowed to send participants only in rugby sevens, sailing, taekwondo and weightlifting — sports where other Pacific countries had proved sufficiently competitive against them in the past. New Zealand was allowed to compete in the 2019 men's football competition with an U-23 team, which won the gold medal. Australia and New Zealand have since continued to compete on an invitational basis.

In 2018, the Council created an "associate membership" category for other territories in Oceania. Potential candidates for membership include Bougainville, Easter Island, Western New Guinea, Hawaii and Christmas Island.

Nation	Organisation	Website
American Samoa	American Samoa National Olympic Committee (ASNOC)	asnoc.org/
Cook Islands	Cook Islands Sports and National Olympic Committee (CISNOC)	oceaniasport.com/cookis
Federated States of Micronesia	Federated States of Micronesia National Olympic Committee (FSMNOC)	oceaniasport.com/fsm
Fiji	Fiji Association of Sports and National Olympic Committee (FASANOC)	fijiolympiccommittee.com
Guam	Guam National Olympic Committee (GNOC)	oceaniasport.com/guam
Kiribati	Kiribati National Olympic Committee (KNOC)	oceaniasport.com/kiribati
Marshall Islands	Marshall Islands National Olympic Committee (MINOC)	oceaniasport.com/marshalls
Nauru	Nauru Olympic Committee	oceaniasport.com/nauru
New Caledonia	Comité Territorial Olympique et Sportif de Nouvelle-Calédonie (CTOS)	www.ctos.nc
Niue	Niue Island Sports and Commonwealth Games Association (NISCGA)	oceaniasport.com/niue
Norfolk Island	Norfolk Island Amateur Sports & Commonwealth Games Association	sportingpulse.com/assoc_page.cgi?assoc=3852
Northern Mariana Islands	Northern Marianas Amateur Sports Association	sportingpulse.com/assoc_page.cgi?assoc=3859
Palau	Palau National Olympic Committee (PNOC)	oceaniasport.com/palau
Papua New Guinea	Papua New Guinea Sports Federation & National Olympic Committee (PNGSFOC)	oceaniasport.com/png
Samoa	Samoa Association of Sports and National Olympic Committee (SASNOC)	oceaniasport.com/samoa
Solomon Islands	Solomon Islands National Olympic Committee (NOCSI)	oceaniasport.com/solomon
Tahiti	Comité olympique de Polynésie française (COPF)	www.copftahiti.com
Tokelau	Tokelau Sports Federation	sportingpulse.com/assoc_page.cgi?assoc=3861
Tonga	Tonga Sports Association and National Olympic Committee (TASANOC)	oceaniasport.com/tonga
Tuvalu	Tuvalu Association of Sports and National Olympic Committee (TASNOC)	oceaniasport.com/tuvalu
Vanuatu	Vanuatu Association of Sports and National Olympic Committee (VASANOC)	oceaniasport.com/vanuatu
Wallis and Futuna	Comité Territorial Olympique et Sportif des Iles Wallis et Futuna (CTOSWF)	wallisetfutuna.franceolympique.com

== Executive board ==
The executive board manages the affairs of the PGC. Its members include the President, three Vice Presidents, and two other members. All members are elected, by secret ballot, by a majority of votes cast, for a four-year term.

Designation	Name	Country
President	Vidhya Lakhan	Fiji
Vice Presidents	Marcus Stephen	Nauru
Vice Presidents	Laurent Cassier	New Caledonia
Vice Presidents	Tamzin Wardley	Papua New Guinea
Chief Executive Officer	Andrew Minogue	Australia
Athletes' Representative	Ryan Pini	Papua New Guinea

=== Committees ===
Committee	Designation	Name	Country
Sports	Chair	Marcus Stephen	Nauru
Sports	Members	Ryan Pini	Papua New Guinea
Sports	Members	Roger Wahl	Guam
Sports	Members	Michel Quintin	New Caledonia
Sports	Members	Milton Bradley	Norfolk Island
Sports	Members	Yvonne Mullins	Australia
Marketing	Chair	Laurent Cassier	New Caledonia
Marketing	Members	Damien Beddoes	Cook Islands
Marketing	Members	Joseph Rodan Sr.	Fiji
Marketing	Members	Tala Pauga	Samoa
Marketing	Members	Allan Kalfabun	Vanuatu
Marketing	Members	Jerry Tan	Northern Mariana Islands
Audit and Finance	Chair	Tamzin Wardley	Papua New Guinea
Audit and Finance	Members	Joey Miranda III	Guam
Audit and Finance	Members	Charles Tauziet	Tahiti

== Presidents ==
Name	Country/Territory	Term
Vidhya Lakhan	Fiji	current (as of 2025)
Paul Wallwork	Samoa	(elected 1991)

== See also ==
- Pacific Games
- Pacific Mini Games
- Oceania National Olympic Committees
- International Olympic Committee
