= Federated States of Micronesia at the 2008 Summer Olympics =

- Flag of the Federated States of Micronesia
- IOC code: FSM
- NOC: Federated States of Micronesia National Olympic Committee
- Website: www.oceaniasport.com/fsm

in Beijing
- Competitors: 5 in 3 sports
- Flag bearer: Manuel Minginfel
- Medals: Gold 0 Silver 0 Bronze 0 Total 0

Summer Olympics appearances (overview)
- 2000; 2004; 2008; 2012; 2016; 2020; 2024; 2028

The Federated States of Micronesia sent a team of five athletes to compete at the 2008 Summer Olympics in Beijing, China. The appearance of the delegation marked the third appearance by a Micronesian team at the Olympics since its debut at the 2000 Summer Olympics in Sydney, Australia. Three male athletes (Jack Howard in athletics, Kerson Hadley in swimming and Manuel Minginfel in weightlifting) and two female athletes (Maria Ikelap in athletics and Debra Daniel in swimming) comprised the Olympic team. None of the track or swimming athletes advanced past the qualification round, and Minginfel placed second to last in his event. There has yet to be a medalist from the Federated States of Micronesia. Minginfel held the Micronesian flag in the opening ceremony.

== Background ==
The Federated States of Micronesia is a collection of some 6,000 islands in the South Pacific Ocean that includes approximately 100,000 people. The nation is composed of several states that each embody a prominent ethnic group amongst the island group, and lies approximately three-quarters of the way between Hawaii and Indonesia. After World War II, the Micronesian island chain became a United Nations trust territory administered by the United States. The Federated States of Micronesia became an independent country on 1986, but freely associates with the United States, which handles matters of defense. The Federated States of Micronesia sent its first delegation to participate in the Olympics approximately 14 years after it became a sovereign entity, sending three men and two women to the 2000 Summer Olympics in Sydney, Australia. Between then and Beijing in 2008, three male and two female Micronesian athletes participating across three sports have appeared at the Olympics at every instance. Prior to Beijing, there had been no medalists from the Federated States of Micronesia; no medals were won by Micronesian athletes at the Beijing games either. Up to and including the Beijing Olympics, weightlifter Manuel Minginfel had been the flagbearer for Micronesia at every opening ceremony.

At the Beijing games, the youngest athlete was swimmer Debra Daniel, who was 17 years old. The eldest was Minginfel at age 29. Of the delegation, the only one who had been to multiple Olympic games was Minginfel.

== Athletics ==
Jack Howard represented the Federated States of Micronesia as its only male track athlete at the Beijing Olympics. He competed in the men's 100 meters races. Born in the island of Weno in the Chuuk Lagoon along with his twin brother John Howard, Jack Howard was born in July 1981 and was 27 years old when he competed in Beijing. Howard had not previously competed at any Olympic games. Howard competed in heat seven against seven other athletes in the qualification round of the event on August 14. He finished the race in 11.03 seconds, ranking seventh in his heat; he placed ahead of Gordon Heather of the Cook Islands (11.41 seconds) and immediately behind Monaco's Sebastien Gattuso (10.70 seconds) in a heat led by Qatar's Samuel Francis (10.40 seconds) and Trinidad and Tobago's Marc Burns (10.46 seconds). Overall, 80 competitors took part in the qualification round of the event. Howard ranked 66th. Of the 80 competitors to compete the top 41 qualified for the second round and, therefore, Howard did not advance to later rounds.

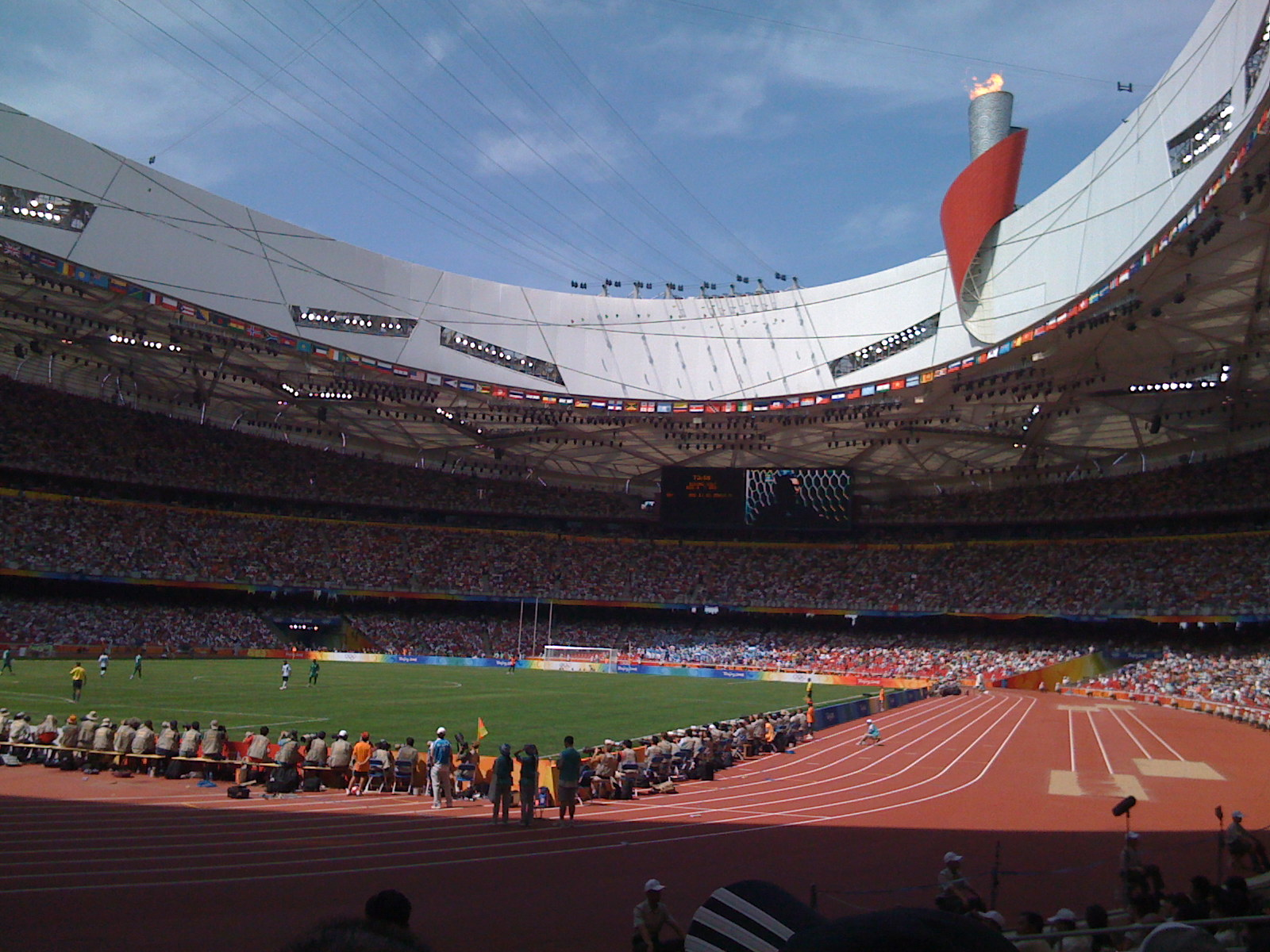
The Beijing National Stadium, where Howard and Ikelap competed in their events

Maria Epiph Ikelap competed on the Federated States of Micronesia's behalf at the Beijing Olympics in the women's 100 meters races. Born in 1987 in Weno, an island in the archipelago of Chuuk, Ikelap was 21 years old at the time of her participation in the 2008 Olympics. Ikelap had not previously competed in any Olympic games. During the qualification round of her event, which took place on August 15, Ikelap competed in the ninth heat against eight other athletes. She finished the race in 13.73 seconds, ending in eighth place. Lao's Philaylack Sackpaseuth ranked immediately behind Ikelap (13.86 seconds), while Yemen's Waseelah Saad ranked immediately ahead (13.60 seconds). The heat itself was led by Russia's Evgeniya Polyakova (11.24 seconds) and Barbados's Jade Bailey (11.46 seconds). Of the 85 competitors in the event's first round, Ikelap ranked 80th and, therefore, that was the end of her competition.

Key

- Note–Ranks given for track events are within the athlete's heat only
- Q = Qualified for the next round
- q = Qualified for the next round as a fastest loser or, in field events, by position without achieving the qualifying target
- NR = National record
- N/A = Round not applicable for the event
- Bye = Athlete not required to compete in round

Athlete	Event	Heat		Quarterfinal		Semifinal		Final	
Athlete	Event	Result	Rank	Result	Rank	Result	Rank	Result	Rank
Jack Howard	Men's 100 m	11.03	7	Did not advance					
Maria Ikelap	Women's 100 m	13.73	8	Did not advance					

== Swimming ==
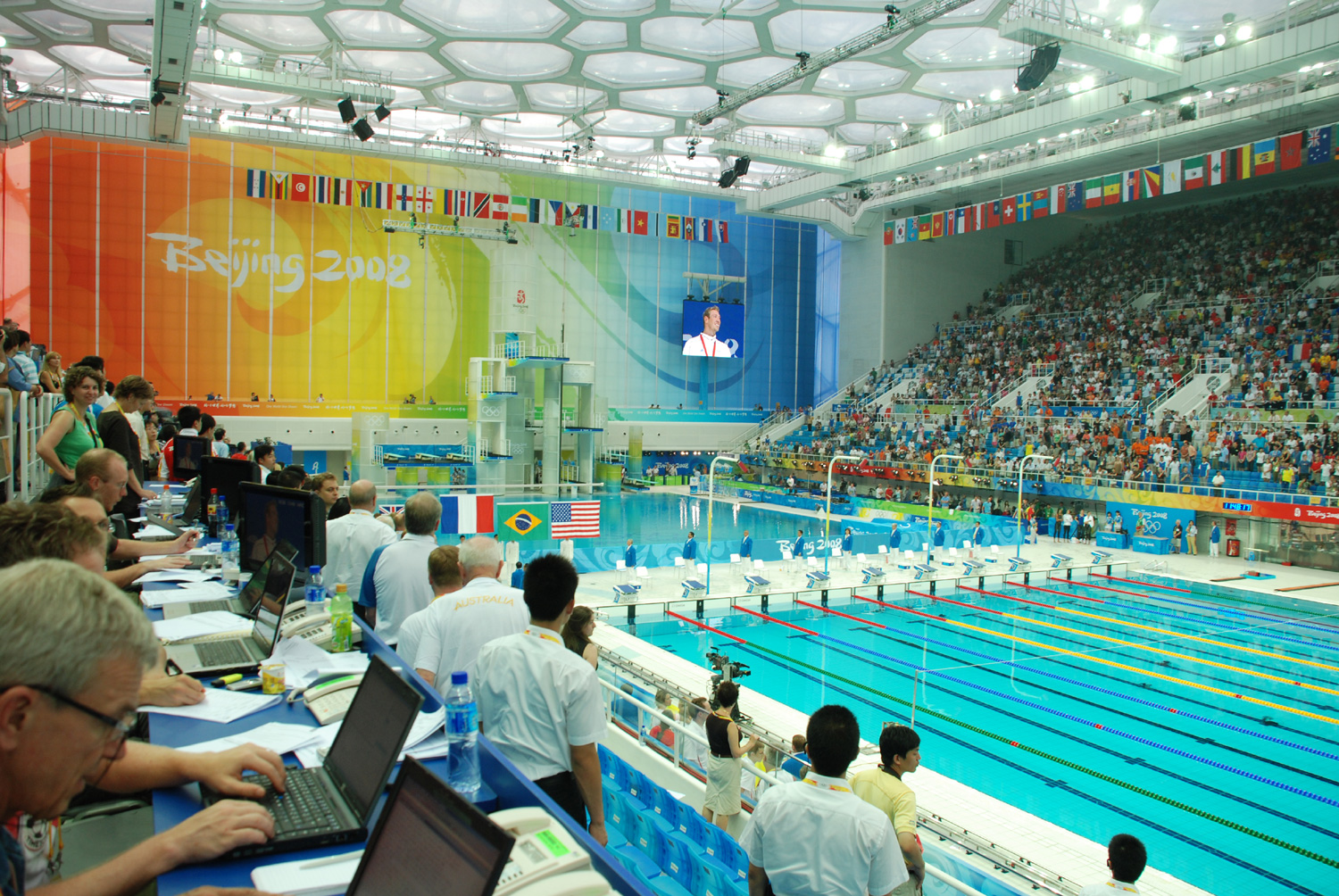
The Beijing National Aquatics Center is where Hadley and Daniel competed in their events.

Kerson Hadley represented the Federated States of Micronesia as its only male swimmer competing in the Beijing Olympics. Hadley took part in the men's 50 meters freestyle race. He was born in May 1989, and was 19 years old when he appeared in Beijing for his races. Hadley had not previously competed at any Olympic games. The preliminary round for the men's 50 meters freestyle took place on August 14, with Hadley in the eight-person fifth heat. With a time of 25.34 seconds, Hadley finished fifth, displacing John Kamyuka of Botswana (25.54 seconds) but falling behind Andrey Molchanov of Turkmenistan (25.02 seconds). The heat was led by Cameroon's Alain Brigion Tobe (24.53 seconds) and Sidni Hoxha of Albania (24.56 seconds). Of the 97 people who competed in the event's preliminary round, Hadley ranked 70th. He did not advance to later rounds.

Debra Daniel, Federated States of Micronesia's youngest competitor at the Beijing games, represented the Federated States of Micronesia at Beijing as its only female swimmer, as she was a competitor in the women's 50 meters freestyle event. Born in March 1991, Daniel was 17 years old when she arrived in Beijing to compete at the 2008 Summer Olympics. Daniel had not previously competed at any Olympic games. The preliminary round of her event took place on August 15; Daniel was placed in the third heat against seven other athletes for the races. She finished in 30.61 seconds, placing fifth. Daniel ranked immediately ahead of Tanzania's Magdalena Moshi (31.37 seconds) and immediately behind Julianne Kirchner of the Marshall Islands in a heat led by Ugandan swimmer Olivia Aya Nakitanda (29.38 seconds) and Botswana's Samantha Paxinos (29.92 seconds). Of the 90 athletes who finished the event, Debra Daniel ranked 76th. Therefore, Daniel did not advance to later rounds.

Athlete	Event	Heat		Semifinal		Final	
Athlete	Event	Time	Rank	Time	Rank	Time	Rank
Debra Daniel	Women's 50 m freestyle	30.61	76	Did not advance			
Kerson Hadley	Men's 50 m freestyle	25.34	70	Did not advance			

== Weightlifting ==
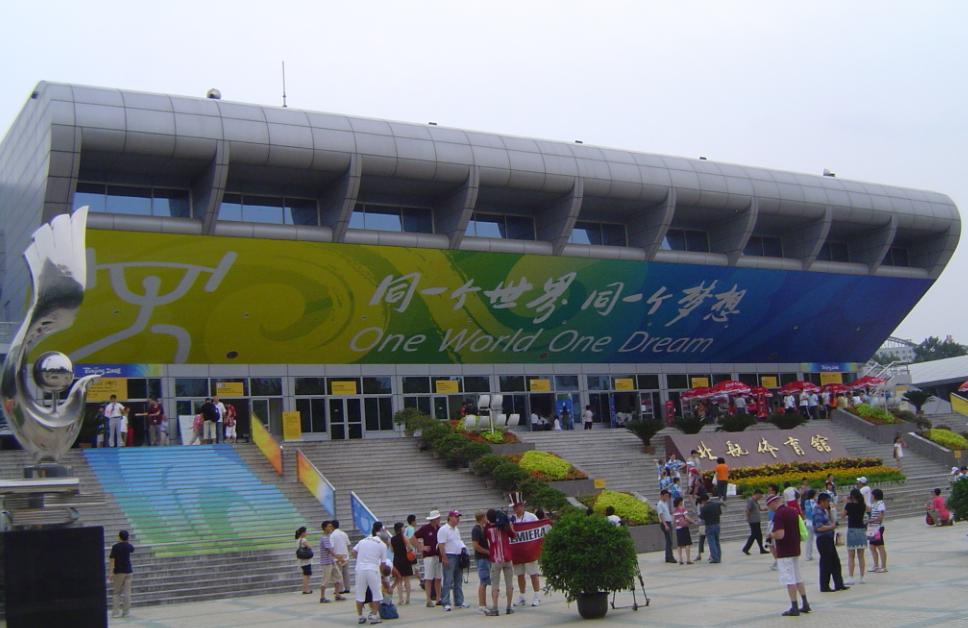
The Beihang University Gymnasium, where Minginfel competed in weightlifting.

Manuel Minginfel was the only weightlifter at the Beijing Olympics who competed under the banner of the Federated States of Micronesia. He participated in the men's featherweight class, which includes athletes of 62 kilograms and below. Born in Yap, Minginfel was 21 years old when he first competed at the 2000 Summer Olympics in Sydney, Australia. Although he was unable to successfully lift any snatches at those games, Minginfel finished in his event when at the 2004 Summer Olympics in Athens, Greece, at 25 years old. The Micronesian athlete was 29 years old when he returned to the Olympics for the third time in 2008. During the course of his event, which took place on August 11, Minginfel was the only Oceanian competing against 16 other athletes. While on the snatch phase, Minginfel successfully lifted 115 kilograms on his first attempt and 120 kilograms on his second attempt, but failed to lift 123 kilograms on his third try. However, he succeeded in all of his clean and jerks, and successfully lifted 145 kilograms; 150 kilograms; then 155 kilograms. His final score, which combines his highest lifted weight from the snatch and clean and jerk categories, was 275 kilograms. Of the 12 athletes who finished the event, Minginfel ranked 11th ahead of Canadian weightlifter Jasvir Singh (266 kilograms) and behind Henadzy Makhveyenia of Belarus (278 kilograms). In comparison, gold medalist Zhang Xiangxiang of China lifted a combined total of 319 kilograms.

Athlete	Event	Snatch		Clean & Jerk		Total	Rank
Athlete	Event	Result	Rank	Result	Rank	Total	Rank
Manuel Minginfel	Men's −62 kg	120	15	155	10	275	11
