= List of Micronesian records in swimming =

The Micronesian records in swimming are the fastest ever performances of swimmers from the Federated States of Micronesia, which are recognised and ratified by the Federated States of Micronesia Swimming Association.

All records were set in finals unless noted otherwise.

== Long Course (50 m) ==
=== Men ===
Event	Time		Name	Club	Date	Meet	Location	Ref
50m freestyle	24.82		Kerson Hadley	-	2012			
100 m freestyle	55.44	h	Katerson Moya	Micronesia	30 July 2025	World Championships	Singapore, Singapore	
200 m freestyle	2:07.89	h	Kyler Kihleng	Micronesia	24 July 2023	World Championships	Fukuoka, Japan	
400 m freestyle								
800 m freestyle								
1500 m freestyle								
50 m backstroke	29.69		Kerson Hadley	-	2011			
100 m backstroke	1:05.29	r	Katerson Moya	Micronesia	24 April 2024	Oceania Championships	Gold Coast, Australia	
200 m backstroke	2:26.49		Kerson Hadley	-	2006			
50 m breaststroke	29.17		Tasi Limtiaco	Micronesia	21 November 2023	Pacific Games	Honiara, Solomon Islands	
100 m breaststroke	1:03.53	h	Tasi Limtiaco	Micronesia	23 July 2023	World Championships	Fukuoka, Japan	
200 m breaststroke	2:18.88		Tasi Limtiaco	Micronesia	19 June 2019	Singapore National Championships	Singapore, Singapore	
50 m butterfly	26.67	h	Katerson Moya	Micronesia	27 July 2025	World Championships	Singapore, Singapore	
100 m butterfly	1:01.46		Kaleo Kihleng	Micronesia	28 June 2018	Oceania Championships	Port Moresby, Papua New Guinea	
200 m butterfly	2:55.00		Tony Augustine	-	2006			
200 m individual medley	2:06.87		Tasi Limtiaco	Micronesia	24 October 2020	Thailand Open Championships	Samutprakarn, Thailand	
400 m individual medley	4:44.99		Tasi Limtiaco	Micronesia	24 November 2023	Pacific Games	Honiara, Solomon Islands	
4×100 m freestyle relay	3:54.78		Tasi Limtiaco (55.71); Katerson Moya (56.26); Kyler Kihleng (57.56); Elijah Eperiam (1:05.25)	Micronesia	23 April 2024	Oceania Championships	Gold Coast, Australia	
4×200 m freestyle relay	9:29.65			-	2006			
4×100 m medley relay	4:19.03		Katerson Moya (1:05.29); Tasi Limtiaco (1:05.25); Kyler Kihleng (1:03.84); Elijah Eperiam (1:04.65)	Micronesia	24 April 2024	Oceania Championships	Gold Coast, Australia	

Legend: # – Record awaiting ratification by Federated States of Micronesia Swimming Association; WR – World record; OC – Oceanian record;
Records not set in finals: h – heat; sf – semifinal; r – relay 1st leg; rh – relay heat 1st leg; b – B final; † – en route to final mark; so – swim-off; tt – time trial

=== Women ===
Event	Time		Name	Club	Date	Meet	Location	Ref
50m freestyle	28.81	h	Kestra Kihleng	Micronesia	3 August 2024	Olympic Games	Paris, France	
100m freestyle	1:03.30	h	Kestra Kihleng	Micronesia	31 July 2025	World Championships	Singapore, Singapore	
200m freestyle	2:25.48		Kestra Kihleng	Micronesia	10 April 2026	Malaysia Open Championships	Kuala Lumpur, Malaysia	
400m freestyle	5:16.51		Kestra Kihleng	Micronesia	26 April 2025	Malaysia Open Championships	Kuala Lumpur, Malaysia	
800m freestyle								
1500m freestyle								
50m backstroke	33.75	h	Debra Daniel	Micronesia	5 August 2015	World Championships	Kazan, Russia	
100m backstroke	1:15.19	h	Debra Daniel	Micronesia	21 June 2016	Oceania Championships	Suva, Fiji	
200m backstroke	2:44.69		Debra Daniel	-	2007			
50m breaststroke	36.55	h	Kestra Kihleng	Micronesia	29 July 2023	World Championships	Fukuoka, Japan	
100m breaststroke	1:23.56	h	Kestra Kihleng	Micronesia	23 November 2023	Pacific Games	Honiara, Solomon Islands	
200m breaststroke	3:05.26		Kestra Kihleng	Micronesia	9 April 2026	Malaysia Open Championships	Kuala Lumpur, Malaysia	
50m butterfly	30.51	h	Kestra Kihleng	Micronesia	1 August 2025	World Championships	Singapore, Singapore	
100m butterfly	1:12.23		Kestra Kihleng	Micronesia	11 April 2026	Malaysia Open Championships	Kuala Lumpur, Malaysia	
200m butterfly	2:47.35		Tracey Route	-	2003			
200m individual medley	2:45.26		Kestra Kihleng	Micronesia	27 April 2025	Malaysia Open Championships	Kuala Lumpur, Malaysia	
400m individual medley	6:04.34		Kestra Kihleng	Micronesia	24 May 2024	Malaysia Open Championships	Kuala Lumpur, Malaysia	
4×100m freestyle relay								
4×200m freestyle relay								
4×100m medley relay								

Legend: # – Record awaiting ratification by Federated States of Micronesia Swimming Association; WR – World record; OC – Oceanian record;
Records not set in finals: h – heat; sf – semifinal; r – relay 1st leg; rh – relay heat 1st leg; b – B final; † – en route to final mark; so – swim-off; tt – time trial

=== Mixed relay ===
Event	Time		Name	Club	Date	Meet	Location	Ref
4×100 m freestyle relay	4:07.97	h	Tasi Limtiaco (54.53); Margie Winter (1:07.33); Taeyanna Adams (1:09.81); Kaleo Kihleng (56.30)	Micronesia	27 July 2019	World Championships	Gwangju, South Korea	
4×100 m medley relay	4:29.25	h	Katerson Moya (1:07.31); Tasi Limtiaco (1:04.60); Kestra Kihleng (1:11.67); Taeyanna Adams (1:05.67)	Micronesia	14 February 2024	World Championships	Doha, Qatar	

Legend: # – Record awaiting ratification by Federated States of Micronesia Swimming Association; WR – World record; OC – Oceanian record;
Records not set in finals: h – heat; so – swim-off

== Short Course (25 m) ==
=== Men ===
Event	Time		Name	Club	Date	Meet	Location	Ref
50 m freestyle	25.47	h	Kaleo Kihleng	Micronesia	13 December 2018	World Championships	Hangzhou, China	
100 m freestyle	51.48	h	Tasi Limtiaco	Micronesia	20 October 2010	World Cup	Tokyo, Japan	
200 m freestyle	2:04.18	h	Kaleo Kihleng	Micronesia	24 September 2017	Asian Indoor and Martial Arts Games	Ashgabat, Turkmenistan	
400 m freestyle								
800 m freestyle								
1500 m freestyle								
50 m backstroke	29.15	h	-	Micronesia	11 April 2008	World Championships	Manchester, United Kingdom	
100 m backstroke	1:12.93	h	Dionisio Augustine	Micronesia	3 December 2014	World Championships	Doha, Qatar	
200 m backstroke								
50 m breaststroke	28.26	h	Tasi Limtiaco	Micronesia	17 December 2022	World Championships	Melbourne, Australia	
100 m breaststroke	1:01.98	h	Tasi Limtiaco	Micronesia	14 December 2022	World Championships	Melbourne, Australia	
200 m breaststroke	2:18.58		Tasi Limtiaco	Micronesia	24 October 2021	TSA-AIMG Swim Trials	Thailand	
50 m butterfly	26.98	h, †	Tasi Limtiaco	Micronesia	11 December 2018	World Championships	Hangzhou, China	
100 m butterfly	1:00.65	h	Kaleo Kihleng	Micronesia	23 September 2017	Asian Indoor and Martial Arts Games	Ashgabat, Turkmenistan	
200 m butterfly								
100 m individual medley	57.05	h	Tasi Limtiaco	Micronesia	18 December 2021	World Championships	Abu Dhabi, United Arab Emirates	
200 m individual medley	2:05.06	h	Tasi Limtiaco	Micronesia	16 December 2021	World Championships	Abu Dhabi, United Arab Emirates	
400 m individual medley								
4×50 m freestyle relay								
4×100 m freestyle relay								
4×200 m freestyle relay								
4×50 m medley relay								
4×100 m medley relay								

Legend: # – Record awaiting ratification by Federated States of Micronesia Swimming Association; WR – World record; OC – Oceanian record;
Records not set in finals: h – heat; sf – semifinal; r – relay 1st leg; rh – relay heat 1st leg; b – B final; † – en route to final mark; so – swim-off; tt – time trial

=== Women ===
Event	Time		Name	Club	Date	Meet	Location	Ref
50 m freestyle	28.86	h	Margie Winter	Micronesia	15 December 2018	World Championships	Hangzhou, China	
100 m freestyle	1:05.25	h	Jourdyn Adams	Micronesia	17 December 2021	World Championships	Abu Dhabi, United Arab Emirates	
200 m freestyle								
400 m freestyle								
800 m freestyle								
1500 m freestyle								
50m backstroke	33.94	h	Debra Daniel	Micronesia	18 December 2010	World Championships	Dubai, United Arab Emirates	
100 m backstroke								
200 m backstroke								
50 m breaststroke	37.00	h	Taeyanna Adams	Micronesia	11 December 2018	World Championships	Hangzhou, China	
100 m breaststroke	1:30.71	h	Taeyanna Adams	Micronesia	22 September 2017	Asian Indoor and Martial Arts Games	Ashgabat, Turkmenistan	
200 m breaststroke								
50 m butterfly	31.57	h	Margie Winter	Micronesia	13 December 2018	World Championships	Hangzhou, China	
100 m butterfly								
200m butterfly	3:07.76	h	Debra Daniel	Micronesia	15 December 2010	World Championships	Dubai, United Arab Emirates	
100m individual medley	1:21.07	h	Mayra-Linda Paul	Micronesia	4 December 2014	World Championships	Doha, Qatar	
200 m individual medley								
400 m individual medley								
4×50 m freestyle relay								
4×100 m freestyle relay								
4×200 m freestyle relay								
4×50 m medley relay								
4×100 m medley relay								

Legend: # – Record awaiting ratification by Federated States of Micronesia Swimming Association; WR – World record; OC – Oceanian record;
Records not set in finals: h – heat; sf – semifinal; r – relay 1st leg; rh – relay heat 1st leg; b – B final; † – en route to final mark; so – swim-off; tt – time trial
