= Federated States of Micronesia at the 2012 Summer Olympics =

- Flag of the Federated States of Micronesia
- IOC code: FSM
- NOC: Federated States of Micronesia National Olympic Committee
- Website: www.oceaniasport.com/fsm

in London
- Competitors: 6 in 4 sports
- Flag bearers: Manuel Minginfel (opening); Debra Daniel (closing)
- Medals: Gold 0 Silver 0 Bronze 0 Total 0

Summer Olympics appearances (overview)
- 2000; 2004; 2008; 2012; 2016; 2020; 2024

The Oceanic island nation of the Federated States of Micronesia competed at the 2012 Summer Olympics in London, held from 27 July to 12 August 2012. This was the nation's fourth consecutive appearance at the Olympics.

Federated States of Micronesia National Olympic Committee (FSMNOC) exceeded by one its athletes sent to any of the previous three Olympic Games. Six athletes were selected to the team, competing in 4 different sports; two of them had competed in Beijing, including swimmer Kerson Hadley, who set his personal best in the men's freestyle event. Weightlifter Manuel Minginfel, who competed in the Olympics since the national debut, repeated his best performance from Athens, after finishing in tenth place. FSMNOC appointed him to reprise his role for the fourth time as the national flag bearer at the opening ceremony. The island nation has yet to win its first Olympic medal.

== Athletics ==
Key

- Note–Ranks given for track events are within the athlete's heat only
- Q = Qualified for the next round
- q = Qualified for the next round as a fastest loser or, in field events, by position without achieving the qualifying target
- NR = National record
- N/A = Round not applicable for the event
- Bye = Athlete not required to compete in round

Men

Athlete	Event	Heat		Quarterfinal		Semifinal		Final	
Athlete	Event	Result	Rank	Result	Rank	Result	Rank	Result	Rank
John Howard	100 m	11.05	5	did not advance					

Women

Athlete	Event	Heat		Quarterfinal		Semifinal		Final	
Athlete	Event	Result	Rank	Result	Rank	Result	Rank	Result	Rank
Mihter Wendolin	100 m	13.67	8	did not advance					

== Swimming ==
Men

Athlete	Event	Heat		Semifinal		Final	
Athlete	Event	Time	Rank	Time	Rank	Time	Rank
Kerson Hadley	50 m freestyle	24.82	40	did not advance			

Women

Athlete	Event	Heat		Semifinal		Final	
Athlete	Event	Time	Rank	Time	Rank	Time	Rank
Debra Daniel	50 m freestyle	30.32	56	did not advance			

== Weightlifting ==
Micronesia has won 1 quota in weightlifting.

Athlete	Event	Snatch		Clean & Jerk		Total	Rank
Athlete	Event	Result	Rank	Result	Rank	Total	Rank
Manuel Minginfel	Men's −62 kg	127	11	158	10	285	10

== Wrestling ==
Micronesia has qualified in the following events.

Key:

- VT - Victory by Fall.
- PP - Decision by Points - the loser with technical points.
- PO - Decision by Points - the loser without technical points.

Men's Greco-Roman

Athlete	Event	Qualification	Round of 16	Quarterfinal	Semifinal	Repechage 1	Repechage 2	Final / BM	
Athlete	Event	Opposition Result	Opposition Result	Opposition Result	Opposition Result	Opposition Result	Opposition Result	Opposition Result	Rank
Keitani Graham	−84 kg	Betts (USA); L 0–3 ^{PO}	did not advance						20
