= Federated States of Micronesia at the 2016 Summer Olympics =

- Flag of the Federated States of Micronesia
- IOC code: FSM
- NOC: Federated States of Micronesia National Olympic Committee
- Website: www.oceaniasport.com/fsm

in Rio de Janeiro
- Competitors: 5 in 3 sports
- Flag bearer: Jennifer Chieng
- Medals: Gold 0 Silver 0 Bronze 0 Total 0

Summer Olympics appearances (overview)
- 2000; 2004; 2008; 2012; 2016; 2020; 2024

The Federated States of Micronesia competed at the 2016 Summer Olympics in Rio de Janeiro, Brazil, from 5 to 21 August 2016. This was the nation's fifth consecutive appearance at the Summer Olympics.

Federated States of Micronesia National Olympic Committee (FSMNOC) selected a team of five athletes, two men and three women, to compete only in athletics, swimming, and women's boxing (the country's Olympic debut in Rio de Janeiro) at the Games. The nation's roster was similar to those sent to Sydney (2000), Athens (2004), and Beijing (2008). Among the Micronesian athletes were freestyle swimmer Debra Daniel, who competed in her third consecutive Games, and lightweight boxer Jennifer Chieng, who led the squad as the nation's flag bearer in the opening ceremony. Federated States of Micronesia, however, have yet to win its first ever Olympic medal.

== Athletics ==
Federated States of Micronesia has received universality slots from IAAF to send two athletes (one male and one female) to the Olympics.

Key

- Note–Ranks given for track events are within the athlete's heat only
- Q = Qualified for the next round
- q = Qualified for the next round as a fastest loser or, in field events, by position without achieving the qualifying target
- NR = National record
- N/A = Round not applicable for the event
- Bye = Athlete not required to compete in round

Track & road events

Athlete	Event	Heat		Quarterfinal		Semifinal		Final	
Athlete	Event	Time	Rank	Time	Rank	Time	Rank	Time	Rank
Kitson Kapiriel	Men's 100 m	11.42	5	did not advance					
Lerissa Henry	Women's 100 m	13.53	8	did not advance					

== Boxing ==
Federated States of Micronesia have received an invitation from the Tripartite Commission to send a female boxer competing in the lightweight division to the Games, signifying the nation's debut in the sport.

Athlete	Event	Round of 16	Quarterfinals	Semifinals	Final	
Athlete	Event	Opposition Result	Opposition Result	Opposition Result	Opposition Result	Rank
Jennifer Chieng	Women's lightweight	Mayer (USA); L 0–3	did not advance			

== Swimming ==
Federated States of Micronesia have received a Universality invitation from FINA to send two swimmers (one male and one female) to the Olympics.

Athlete	Event	Heat		Semifinal		Final	
Athlete	Event	Time	Rank	Time	Rank	Time	Rank
Dionisio Augustine	Men's 50 m freestyle	26.17	65	did not advance			
Debra Daniel	Women's 50 m freestyle	30.83	72	did not advance			
