= Federated States of Micronesia at the Olympics =

- Flag of the Federated States of Micronesia
- IOC code: FSM
- NOC: Federated States of Micronesia National Olympic Committee
- Website: www.oceaniasport.com/fsm
- Medals: Gold 0 Silver 0 Bronze 0 Total 0

Summer appearances
- 2000; 2004; 2008; 2012; 2016; 2020; 2024

Athletes from the Federated States of Micronesia have competed in 7 Summer Olympic Games since 2000, but have yet to win any medals. The nation has not competed in the Winter Olympic Games.

== Medal tables ==
=== Medals by Summer Games ===
Games	Athletes	Gold	Silver	Bronze	Total	Rank
2000 Sydney	5	0	0	0	0	–
2004 Athens	5	0	0	0	0	–
2008 Beijing	5	0	0	0	0	–
2012 London	6	0	0	0	0	–
2016 Rio de Janeiro	5	0	0	0	0	–
2020 Tokyo	3	0	0	0	0	–
2024 Paris	3	0	0	0	0	–
2028 Los Angeles	future event					
2032 Brisbane	future event					
Total		0	0	0	0	–

== See also ==
- List of flag bearers for the Federated States of Micronesia at the Olympics
- List of participating nations at the Summer Olympic Games
- List of participating nations at the Winter Olympic Games
