= Federated States of Micronesia at the 2023 World Athletics Championships =

- Flag of the Federated States of Micronesia
- WA code: FSM

in Budapest, Hungary 19 August 2023 – 27 August 2023
- Competitors: 1 (1 man and 0 women)
- Medals: Gold 0 Silver 0 Bronze 0 Total 0

World Athletics Championships appearances
- 1997; 1999; 2001; 2003; 2005; 2007; 2009; 2011; 2013; 2015; 2017; 2019; 2022; 2023; 2025

The Federated States of Micronesia competed at the 2023 World Athletics Championships in Budapest, Hungary, which were held from 19 to 27 August 2023. The athlete delegation of the country was composed of one competitor, sprinter Scott Fiti who competed in the men's 100 metres. He qualified for the Championships upon being selected by the Federated States of Micronesia Athletic Association. In his preliminary round, Fiti placed last and failed to advance further.

== Background ==
The 2023 World Athletics Championships in Budapest, Hungary, were held from 19 to 27 August 2023. The Championships were held at the National Athletics Centre. To qualify for the World Championships, athletes had to reach an entry standard (e.g. time or distance), place in a specific position at select competitions, be a wild card entry, or qualify through their World Athletics Ranking at the end of the qualification period.

As Federated States of Micronesia did not meet any of the four standards, they could send either one male or one female athlete in one event of the Championships who has not yet qualified. The Federated States of Micronesia Athletic Association selected sprinter Scott Fiti, who would compete in the men's 100 metres. Prior to the Championships, Fiti held a personal best of 11.10 seconds and a season's best of 11.68 seconds in the event. Previously, he had competed for the nation at the 2020 Summer Olympics and the past three editions of the World Championships.

== Results ==
Fiti competed in the fourth preliminary round heat of the men's 100 metres on 19 August against five other sprinters. There, he recorded a time of 11.69 seconds and placed last, failing to advance further to the heats as only the top two of each heat and the two next fastest would be able to do so.

Key

- Q = Qualified for the next round
- q = Qualified for the next round as a fastest loser or, in field events, by position without achieving the qualifying target
- NR = National record
- PB = Personal best
- SB = Season best
- N/A = Round not applicable for the event

Men's track and road events
Athlete	Event	Preliminary		Heat		Semifinal		Final	
Athlete	Event	Result	Rank	Result	Rank	Result	Rank	Result	Rank
Scott Fiti	100 metres	11.69	6	Did not advance					
