= Federated States of Micronesia at the 2020 Summer Olympics =

- Flag of the Federated States of Micronesia
- IOC code: FSM
- NOC: Federated States of Micronesia National Olympic Committee
- Website: www.oceaniasport.com/fsm

in Tokyo July 23, 2021 – August 8, 2021
- Competitors: 3 in 2 sports
- Flag bearers (opening): Taeyanna Adams; Scott Fiti
- Flag bearer (closing): N/A
- Medals: Gold 0 Silver 0 Bronze 0 Total 0

Summer Olympics appearances (overview)
- 2000; 2004; 2008; 2012; 2016; 2020; 2024

The Federated States of Micronesia competed at the 2020 Summer Olympics in Tokyo. Originally scheduled to take place from 24 July to 9 August 2020, the Games were postponed to 23 July to 8 August 2021, due to the COVID-19 pandemic. This was the nation's sixth appearance at the Olympics, since its debut in 2000.

== Competitors ==
The following is the list of number of competitors in the Games:

Sport	Men	Women	Total
Athletics	1	0	1
Swimming	1	1	2
Total	2	1	3

== Athletics ==
Federated States of Micronesia received a universality invitation from the World Athletics to send a male track and field athlete to the Olympics.

Key

- Note–Ranks given for track events are within the athlete's heat only
- Q = Qualified for the next round
- q = Qualified for the next round as a fastest loser or, in field events, by position without achieving the qualifying target
- NR = National record
- N/A = Round not applicable for the event
- Bye = Athlete not required to compete in round

Track & road events

Athlete	Event	Heat		Quarterfinal		Semifinal		Final	
Athlete	Event	Result	Rank	Result	Rank	Result	Rank	Result	Rank
Scott Fiti	Men's 100 m	11.25 SB	6	Did not advance					

== Swimming ==
Federated States of Micronesia received a universality invitation from FINA to send two top-ranked swimmers (one per binary gender) in their respective individual events to the Olympics, based on the FINA Points System of June 28, 2021.

Athlete	Event	Heat		Semifinal		Final	
Athlete	Event	Time	Rank	Time	Rank	Time	Rank
Tasi Limtiaco	Men's 200 m individual medley	2:07.69	45	Did not advance			
Taeyanna Adams	Women's 100 m breaststroke	1:25.36	41	Did not advance			
