= Federated States of Micronesia at the 2004 Summer Olympics =

- Flag of the Federated States of Micronesia
- IOC code: FSM
- NOC: Federated States of Micronesia National Olympic Committee
- Website: www.oceaniasport.com/fsm

in Athens
- Competitors: 5 in 3 sports
- Flag bearer: Manuel Minginfel
- Medals: Gold 0 Silver 0 Bronze 0 Total 0

Summer Olympics appearances (overview)
- 2000; 2004; 2008; 2012; 2016; 2020; 2024

The Federated States of Micronesia was represented at the 2004 Summer Olympics in Athens, Greece by the Federated States of Micronesia National Olympic Committee.

In total, five athletes including three men and two women represented the Federated States of Micronesia in three different sports including athletics, swimming and weightlifting.

== Competitors ==
In total, five athletes represented the Federated States of Micronesia at the 2004 Summer Olympics in Athens, Greece across three different sports.

Sport	Men	Women	Total
Athletics	1	1	2
Swimming	1	1	2
Weightlifting	1	0	1
Total	3	2	5

== Athletics ==
In total, two Micronesian athletes participated in the athletics events – John Howard in the men's 100 m and Evangeleen Ikelap in the women's 100 m.

The heats for the men's 100 m took place on 21 August 2004. Howard finished seventh in his heat in a time of 10.85 seconds and he did not advance to the quarter-final.

Athlete	Event	Heat		Quarterfinal		Semifinal		Final	
Athlete	Event	Result	Rank	Result	Rank	Result	Rank	Result	Rank
John Howard	100 m	10.85 NR	7	did not advance					

The heats for the women's 100 m took place on 20 August 2004. Ikelap finished seventh in her heat in a time of 13.5 seconds and she did not advance to the quarter-finals.

Athlete	Event	Heat		Quarterfinal		Semifinal		Final	
Athlete	Event	Result	Rank	Result	Rank	Result	Rank	Result	Rank
Evangeleen Ikelap	100 m	13.50	7	did not advance					

== Swimming ==
In total, two Micronesian athletes participated in the swimming events – Anderson Bonabart in the men's 50 m freestyle and Tracy Ann Route in the women's 50 m freestyle.

The heats for the men's 50 m freestyle took place on 19 August 2004. Bonabart finished first in his heat in a time of 26.75 seconds which was ultimately not fast enough to advance to the semi-finals.

Athlete	Event	Heat		Semifinal		Final	
Athlete	Event	Time	Rank	Time	Rank	Time	Rank
Anderson Bonabart	50 m freestyle	26.75	68	did not advance			

The heats for the women's 50 m freestyle took place on 20 August 2004. Route finished third in her heat in a time of 31.26 seconds which was ultimately not fast enough to advance to the semi-finals.

Athlete	Event	Heat		Semifinal		Final	
Athlete	Event	Time	Rank	Time	Rank	Time	Rank
Tracy Ann Route	50 m freestyle	31.26	=65	did not advance			

== Weightlifting ==
In total, one Micronesian athlete participated in the weightlifting events – Manuel Minginfel in the men's −62 kg category.

The men's −62 kg category took place on 16 August 2004. Minginfel lifted 120 kg (snatch) and 152.5 kg (clean and jerk) for a combined total of 272.5 kg to finish 10th.

Athlete	Event	Snatch		Clean & Jerk		Total	Rank
Athlete	Event	Result	Rank	Result	Rank	Total	Rank
Manuel Minginfel	Men's −62 kg	120	=12	152.5	11	272.5	10
