= Federated States of Micronesia at the 2015 World Aquatics Championships =

- Flag of the Federated States of Micronesia
- World Aquatics code: FSM
- National federation: Federated States of Micronesia Swimming Association

in Kazan, Russia
- Competitors: 3 in 1 sport
- Medals: Gold 0 Silver 0 Bronze 0 Total 0

World Aquatics Championships appearances
- 2003; 2005; 2007; 2009; 2011; 2013; 2015; 2017; 2019; 2022; 2023; 2024; 2025

The Federated States of Micronesia competed at the 2015 World Aquatics Championships in Kazan, Russia from 24 July to 9 August 2015.

== Swimming ==
Micronesian swimmers have achieved qualifying standards in the following events (up to a maximum of 2 swimmers in each event at the A-standard entry time, and 1 at the B-standard):

Men

Athlete	Event	Heat		Semifinal		Final	
Athlete	Event	Time	Rank	Time	Rank	Time	Rank
Dionisio Augustine	50 m freestyle	26.92	90	did not advance			
Dionisio Augustine	50 m breaststroke	33.91	67	did not advance			
Kaleo Kihleng	100 m freestyle	1:01.71	111	did not advance			
Kaleo Kihleng	50 m butterfly	30.15	69	did not advance			

Women

Athlete	Event	Heat		Semifinal		Final	
Athlete	Event	Time	Rank	Time	Rank	Time	Rank
Debra Daniel	50 m freestyle	30.48	93	did not advance			
Debra Daniel	50 m backstroke	33.75	48	did not advance			
