= Federated States of Micronesia at the 2023 World Aquatics Championships =

- Flag of the Federated States of Micronesia
- FINA code: FSM
- National federation: Federated States of Micronesia Swimming Association

in Fukuoka, Japan
- Competitors: 4 in 1 sport

World Aquatics Championships appearances
- 2003; 2005; 2007; 2009; 2011; 2013; 2015; 2017; 2019; 2022; 2023; 2024

Federated States of Micronesia is set to compete at the 2023 World Aquatics Championships in Fukuoka, Japan from 14 to 30 July.

== Swimming ==
Federated States of Micronesia entered 4 swimmers.

Men

| Athlete | Event | Heat | | Semifinal | | Final | |
| Athlete | Event | Time | Rank | Time | Rank | Time | Rank |
|---|---|---|---|---|---|---|---|
| Kyler Anthony Kihleng | 100 metre freestyle | 58.21 | 106 | Did not advance | | | |
| Kyler Anthony Kihleng | 200 metre freestyle | 2:07.89 | 72 | Did not advance | | | |
| Tasi Limtiaco | 50 metre breaststroke | 28.95 | 40 | Did not advance | | | |
| Tasi Limtiaco | 100 metre breaststroke | 1:03.53 | 47 | Did not advance | | | |

Women

| Athlete | Event | Heat | | Semifinal | | Final | |
| Athlete | Event | Time | Rank | Time | Rank | Time | Rank |
|---|---|---|---|---|---|---|---|
| Taeyanna Adams | 100 metre breaststroke | 1:25.99 | 56 | Did not advance | | | |
| Taeyanna Adams | 50 metre butterfly | 32.53 | 57 | Did not advance | | | |
| Kestra Kihleng | 50 metre freestyle | 29.17 | 77 | Did not advance | | | |
| Kestra Kihleng | 50 metre breaststroke | 36.55 | 43 | Did not advance | | | |

Mixed

| Athlete | Event | Heat | | Final | |
| Athlete | Event | Time | Rank | Time | Rank |
|---|---|---|---|---|---|
| Taeyanna Adams; Tasi Limtiaco; Kyler Anthony Kihleng; Kestra Kihleng | 4 × 100 m freestyle relay | 4:03.87 | 38 | Did not advance | |
| Kyler Anthony Kihleng; Tasi Limtiaco; Kestra Kihleng; Taeyanna Adams | 4 × 100 m medley relay | 4:36.96 | 37 | Did not advance | |
