= Federated States of Micronesia at the 2011 World Aquatics Championships =

- Flag of the Federated States of Micronesia
- FINA code: FSM
- National federation: Federated States of Micronesia Swimming Association

in Shanghai, China
- Competitors: 3 in 1 sport
- Medals: Gold 0 Silver 0 Bronze 0 Total 0

World Aquatics Championships appearances
- 2003; 2005; 2007; 2009; 2011; 2013; 2015; 2017; 2019; 2022; 2023; 2024

Federated States of Micronesia competed at the 2011 World Aquatics Championships in Shanghai, China between 16 and 31 July 2011.

== Swimming ==
The Federated States of Micronesia qualified 3 swimmers.

Men

Athlete	Event	Heats		Semifinals		Final	
Athlete	Event	Time	Rank	Time	Rank	Time	Rank
Dionisio Augustine	100 m freestyle	1:02.41	94	did not advance			
Dionisio Augustine	50 m butterfly	30.59	51	did not advance			
Kerson Hadley	50 m freestyle	25.72	70	did not advance			
Kerson Hadley	50 m backstroke	30.46	33	did not advance			

Women

Athlete	Event	Heats		Semifinals		Final	
Athlete	Event	Time	Rank	Time	Rank	Time	Rank
Debra Daniel	100 m freestyle	1:06.87	69	did not advance			
Debra Daniel	100 m butterfly	1:14.51	47	did not advance			
