= Federated States of Micronesia at the 2019 World Athletics Championships =

Federated States of Micronesia at the 2019 World Championships in Athletics
- Flag of the Federated States of Micronesia
- WA code: FSM
- National federation: Federated States of Micronesia Athletic Association
- Website: Official website

in Doha, Qatar 27 September 2019 – 6 October 2019
- Competitors: 1 in 1 event
- Medals: Gold 0 Silver 0 Bronze 0 Total 0

World Championships in Athletics appearances
- 1997; 1999; 2001; 2003; 2005; 2007; 2009; 2011; 2013; 2015; 2017; 2019; 2022; 2023

The Federated States of Micronesia competed at the 2019 World Championships in Athletics in Doha, Qatar, from 27 September to 6 October 2019.

== Results ==
=== Men ===
Track and road events

Athlete	Event	Preliminary Round		Heat		Semifinal		Final	
Athlete	Event	Result	Rank	Result	Rank	Result	Rank	Result	Rank
Scott Fiti	100 metres	11.34	19	Did not advance					
