= Federated States of Micronesia at the 2019 World Aquatics Championships =

- Flag of the Federated States of Micronesia
- FINA code: FSM
- National federation: Federated States of Micronesia Swimming Association

in Gwangju, South Korea
- Medals: Gold 0 Silver 0 Bronze 0 Total 0

World Aquatics Championships appearances
- 2003; 2005; 2007; 2009; 2011; 2013; 2015; 2017; 2019; 2022; 2023; 2024

Federated States of Micronesia competed at the 2019 World Aquatics Championships in Gwangju, South Korea from 12 to 28 July.

== Swimming ==
Federated States of Micronesia entered four swimmers.

Men

| Athlete | Event | Heat | | Semifinal | | Final | |
| Athlete | Event | Time | Rank | Time | Rank | Time | Rank |
|---|---|---|---|---|---|---|---|
| Kaleo Kihleng | 50 m freestyle | 25.71 | 106 | did not advance | | | |
| Kaleo Kihleng | 100 m freestyle | 55.97 | 101 | did not advance | | | |
| Tasi Limtiaco | 100 m breaststroke | 1:05.10 | 65 | did not advance | | | |
| Tasi Limtiaco | 200 m breaststroke | 2:23.26 | 50 | did not advance | | | |

Women

| Athlete | Event | Heat | | Semifinal | | Final | |
| Athlete | Event | Time | Rank | Time | Rank | Time | Rank |
|---|---|---|---|---|---|---|---|
| Taeyanna Adams | 50 m breaststroke | 37.13 | 47 | did not advance | | | |
| Taeyanna Adams | 100 m breaststroke | 1:26.13 | 53 | did not advance | | | |
| Margie Winter | 50 m freestyle | 29.80 | 80 | did not advance | | | |
| Margie Winter | 100 m freestyle | 1:07.08 | 81 | did not advance | | | |

Mixed

| Athlete | Event | Heat | | Final | |
| Athlete | Event | Time | Rank | Time | Rank |
|---|---|---|---|---|---|
| Tasi Limtiaco; Margie Winter; Taeyanna Adams; Kaleo Kihleng | 4×100 m freestyle relay | 4:07.97 | 33 | did not advance | |
| Kaleo Kihleng; Tasi Limtiaco; Margie Winter; Taeyanna Adams | 4×100 m medley relay | 4:30.16 | 32 | did not advance | |
