= Federated States of Micronesia at the 2024 World Aquatics Championships =

- Flag of the Federated States of Micronesia
- FINA code: FSM
- National federation: Federated States of Micronesia Swimming Association

in Doha, Qatar
- Competitors: 4 in 1 sport
- Medals: Gold 0 Silver 0 Bronze 0 Total 0

World Aquatics Championships appearances
- 2003; 2005; 2007; 2009; 2011; 2013; 2015; 2017; 2019; 2022; 2023; 2024

The Federated States of Micronesia competed at the 2024 World Aquatics Championships in Doha, Qatar from 2 to 18 February 2024.

== Swimming ==
Federated States of Micronesia entered 4 swimmers.

Men

Athlete	Event	Heat		Semifinal		Final	
Athlete	Event	Time	Rank	Time	Rank	Time	Rank
Katerson Moya	50 metre freestyle	25.80	86	Did not advance			
Katerson Moya	50 metre butterfly	27.66	53	Did not advance			
Tasi Limtiaco	50 metre breaststroke	29.06	43	Did not advance			
Tasi Limtiaco	100 metre breaststroke	1:04.16	52	Did not advance			

Women

Athlete	Event	Heat		Semifinal		Final	
Athlete	Event	Time	Rank	Time	Rank	Time	Rank
Taeyanna Adams	50 metre breaststroke	37.87	38	Did not advance			
Taeyanna Adams	100 metre breaststroke	1:24.70	51	Did not advance			
Kestra Kihleng	50 metre freestyle	28.94	74	Did not advance			
Kestra Kihleng	100 metre freestyle	1:04.93	69	Did not advance			

Mixed

Athlete	Event	Heat		Final	
Athlete	Event	Time	Rank	Time	Rank
Tasi Limtiaco; Kestra Kihleng; Katerson Moya; Taeyanna Adams	4 × 100 m freestyle relay	4:05.31	19	Did not advance	
Katerson Moya; Tasi Limtiaco; Kestra Kihleng; Taeyanna Adams	4 × 100 m medley relay	4:29.25	30	Did not advance	
