= Federated States of Micronesia at the 2024 Summer Olympics =

- IOC code: FSM
- NOC: Federated States of Micronesia National Olympic Committee

in Paris, France 26 July 2024 – 11 August 2024
- Competitors: 3 (2 men and 1 woman) in 2 sports
- Flag bearers: Tasi Limtiaco & Kestra Kihleng
- Medals: Gold 0 Silver 0 Bronze 0 Total 0

Summer Olympics appearances (overview)
- 2000; 2004; 2008; 2012; 2016; 2020; 2024

The Federated States of Micronesia competed at the 2024 Summer Olympics in Paris, which took place from 26 July 2024 to 11 August 2024. This was the nation's seventh appearance at the Olympics, since its debut in 2000.

== Competitors ==
The following is the list of number of competitors in the Games.

Sport	Men	Women	Total
Athletics	1	0	1
Swimming	1	1	2
Total	2	1	3

== Athletics ==
Federated States of Micronesia sent one sprinter to compete at the 2024 Summer Olympics.

Key

- Note–Ranks given for track events are within the athlete's heat only
- Q = Qualified for the next round
- q = Qualified for the next round as a fastest loser or, in field events, by position without achieving the qualifying target
- NR = National record
- N/A = Round not applicable for the event
- Bye = Athlete not required to compete in round

Track events

Athlete	Event	Heat		Semifinal		Final	
Athlete	Event	Result	Rank	Result	Rank	Result	Rank
Scott Fiti	Men's 100 m	11.61 SB	7	Did not advance			

== Swimming ==
Federated States of Micronesia sent two swimmers to compete at the 2024 Paris Olympics.

Athlete	Event	Heat		Semifinal		Final	
Athlete	Event	Time	Rank	Time	Rank	Time	Rank
Tasi Limtiaco	Men's 100 m breaststroke	1:04.14	29	Did not advance			
Kestra Kihleng	Women's 50 m freestyle	28.81	52	Did not advance			

Qualifiers for the latter rounds (Q) of all events were decided on a time only basis, therefore positions shown are overall results versus competitors in all heats.
