= Federated States of Micronesia at the 2000 Summer Olympics =

- Flag of the Federated States of Micronesia
- IOC code: FSM
- NOC: Federated States of Micronesia National Olympic Committee
- Website: www.oceaniasport.com/fsm

in Sydney
- Competitors: 5 in 3 sports
- Flag bearer: Manuel Minginfel
- Medals: Gold 0 Silver 0 Bronze 0 Total 0

Summer Olympics appearances (overview)
- 2000; 2004; 2008; 2012; 2016; 2020; 2024

The Federated States of Micronesia competed in the Olympic Games for the first time at the 2000 Summer Olympics in Sydney, Australia.

== Athletics ==
Key

- Note–Ranks given for track events are within the athlete's heat only
- Q = Qualified for the next round
- q = Qualified for the next round as a fastest loser or, in field events, by position without achieving the qualifying target
- NR = National record
- N/A = Round not applicable for the event
- Bye = Athlete not required to compete in round

Men

Athlete	Event	Heat		Quarterfinal		Semifinal		Final	
Athlete	Event	Result	Rank	Result	Rank	Result	Rank	Result	Rank
Elias Rodriguez	marathon	n/a						3.09:14	81

Women

Athlete	Event	Heat		Quarterfinal		Semifinal		Final	
Athlete	Event	Result	Rank	Result	Rank	Result	Rank	Result	Rank
Regina Shotaro	100 m	13.69	8	did not advance					

== Swimming ==
Men

Athlete	Event	Heat		Semifinal		Final	
Athlete	Event	Time	Rank	Time	Rank	Time	Rank
Welbert Samuel	100m backstroke	1.12:38	55	did not advance			

Women

Athlete	Event	Heat		Semifinal		Final	
Athlete	Event	Time	Rank	Time	Rank	Time	Rank
Tracy Ann Route	100m butterfly	1.13:53	49	did not advance			

== Weightlifting ==
Men

Athlete	Event	Snatch			Clean & Jerk			Total	Rank
Athlete	Event	1	2	3	1	2	3	Total	Rank
Manuel Minginfel	– 56 kg	~~97.5~~	~~97.5~~	~~97.5~~	—	—	—	DNF	—
