= Federated States of Micronesia at the 2022 World Aquatics Championships =

- Flag of the Federated States of Micronesia
- FINA code: FSM
- National federation: Federated States of Micronesia Swimming Association

in Budapest, Hungary
- Competitors: 3 in 1 sport
- Medals: Gold 0 Silver 0 Bronze 0 Total 0

World Aquatics Championships appearances
- 2003; 2005; 2007; 2009; 2011; 2013; 2015; 2017; 2019; 2022; 2023; 2024

Federated States of Micronesia competed at the 2022 World Aquatics Championships in Budapest, Hungary from 18 June to 3 July.

== Swimming ==
Swimmers from Federated States of Micronesia have achieved qualifying standards in the following events.

Athlete	Event	Heat		Semifinal		Final	
Athlete	Event	Time	Rank	Time	Rank	Time	Rank
Kyler Anthony Kihleng	Men's 50 m freestyle	27.56	85	did not advance			
Kyler Anthony Kihleng	Men's 100 m freestyle	1:00.72	94	did not advance			
Tasi Limtiaco	Men's 50 m breaststroke	29.23	41	did not advance			
Tasi Limtiaco	Men's 100 m breaststroke	1:04.63	48	did not advance			
Kestra Kihleng	Women's 50 m breaststroke	38.97	52	did not advance			
Kestra Kihleng	Women's 50 m butterfly	31.76	57	did not advance			
