= Oceania National Olympic Committees =

International organization

- Formation: 1981
- Headquarters: Suva, Fiji
- Members: 17 National Olympic Committees and 7 associate members
- Official language: English
- President: (Palau) Baklai Temengil
- Website: oceanianoc.org

The Oceania National Olympic Committees (ONOC) is an international organization which represents the current 17 National Olympic Committees of Oceania.

It is affiliated with the International Olympic Committee and its affiliated bodies, including the Association of National Olympic Committees, and serves as the continental association of Oceania.

Together with the Pacific Games Council, the ONOC organises the quadrennial Pacific Games, held since 1963.

== Member associations ==
In the following table, the year in which the NOC was recognized by the International Olympic Committee (IOC) is also given if it is different from the year in which the NOC was created.

Nation	IOC Code	National Olympic Committee	President	Created	IOC member	Ref.
American Samoa	ASA	American Samoa National Olympic Committee	Ed Imo	1987	Yes	
Australia	AUS	Australian Olympic Committee	Ian Chesterman	1895	Yes	
Cook Islands	COK	Cook Islands Sports and National Olympic Committee	Hugh Richard Graham	1986	Yes	
FS Micronesia	FSM	Federated States of Micronesia Olympic Committee	Berney Martin	1995/1997	Yes	
Fiji	FIJ	Fiji Association of Sports and National Olympic Committee	Makarita Leona	1949/1955	Yes	
Guam	GUM	Guam National Olympic Committee	Ricardo Blas	1976/1986	Yes	
Kiribati	KIR	Kiribati National Olympic Committee	Nicholas McDermott	2002/2003	Yes	
Marshall Islands	MHL	Marshall Islands National Olympic Committee	Kenneth Kramer	2001/2006	Yes	
Nauru	NRU	Nauru Olympic Committee	Marcus Stephen	1991/1994	Yes	
New Zealand	NZL	New Zealand Olympic Committee	Liz Dawson	1911/1919	Yes	
Palau	PLW	Palau National Olympic Committee	Frank Kyota	1997/1999	Yes	
Papua New Guinea	PNG	Papua New Guinea Olympic Committee	Sir John Dawanincura, KT OBE	1973/1974	Yes	
Samoa	SAM	Samoa Association of Sports and National Olympic Committee	Patrick Fepulea'i	1983	Yes	
Solomon Islands	SOL	National Olympic Committee of Solomon Islands	Martin Bai Rara	1983	Yes	
Tonga	TGA	Tonga Sports Association and National Olympic Committee	Michael Bloomfield	1963/1984	Yes	
Tuvalu	TUV	Tuvalu Association of Sports and National Olympic Committee	Iakopo Molotii	2004/2007	Yes	
Vanuatu	VAN	Vanuatu Association of Sports and National Olympic Committee	Antoine Boudier	1987	Yes	

=== Associate members ===
There are seven associate members. Pitcairn Islands Sports is sometimes added

Nation	National Olympic Committee
New Caledonia	Comité Territorial Olympique et Sportif de Nouvelle-Calédonie (CTOS)
Niue	Niue Island Sports Commonwealth Games Association (NISCGA)
Norfolk Island	Norfolk Island Amateur Sports & Commonwealth Games Association
Northern Mariana	Northern Marianas Amateur Sports Association
Tahiti	Olympic Committee of French Polynesia (COPF)
Tokelau	Tokelau Sports Federation
Wallis and Futuna	Comité Territorial Olympique et Sportif des Iles Wallis et Futuna (CTOSWF)

== Events ==
- Pacific Games
- Pacific Mini Games

== See also ==
- Asian Games
- Asian Winter Games
- Oceania Paralympic Committee
