= Federated States of Micronesia at the 2013 World Aquatics Championships =

- Flag of the Federated States of Micronesia
- FINA code: FSM
- National federation: Federated States of Micronesia Swimming Association

in Barcelona, Spain
- Competitors: 2 in 1 sports
- Medals: Gold 0 Silver 0 Bronze 0 Total 0

World Aquatics Championships appearances
- 2003; 2005; 2007; 2009; 2011; 2013; 2015; 2017; 2019; 2022; 2023; 2024

The Federated States of Micronesia competed at the 2013 World Aquatics Championships in Barcelona, Spain between 19 July and 4 August 2013.

== Swimming ==
Micronesian swimmers achieved qualifying standards in the following events (up to a maximum of 2 swimmers in each event at the A-standard entry time, and 1 at the B-standard):

Men

Athlete	Event	Heat		Semifinal		Final	
Athlete	Event	Time	Rank	Time	Rank	Time	Rank
Derek Dainard	50 m freestyle	25.99	77	did not advance			
Derek Dainard	50 m butterfly	35.88	78	did not advance			

Women

Athlete	Event	Heat		Semifinal		Final	
Athlete	Event	Time	Rank	Time	Rank	Time	Rank
Danisha Paul	50 m freestyle	34.29	78	did not advance			
Danisha Paul	50 m butterfly	38.39	60	did not advance			
