= Federated States of Micronesia at the 2011 World Championships in Athletics =

- WA code: FSM
- National federation: Federated States of Micronesia Athletic Association
- Website: www.sportingpulse.com/assoc_page.cgi?c=2-1143-0-0-0&sID=13841&&news_task=DETAIL&articleID=96619&sectionID=13841

in Daegu
- Competitors: 2
- Medals: Gold 0 Silver 0 Bronze 0 Total 0

World Championships in Athletics appearances
- 1997; 1999; 2001; 2003; 2005; 2007; 2009; 2011; 2013; 2015; 2017; 2019; 2022; 2023

The Federated States of Micronesia competed at the 2011 World Championships in Athletics from August 27 to September 4 in Daegu, South Korea. A team of 2 athletes was announced to represent the country in the event.

== Results ==
=== Men ===
Athlete	Event	Preliminaries		Heats		Semifinals		Final	
Athlete	Event	Time Width Height	Rank	Time Width Height	Rank	Time Width Height	Rank	Time Width Height	Rank
John Howard	100 metres	11.71 (SB)	27	did not advance					

=== Women ===
Athlete	Event	Preliminaries		Heats		Semifinals		Final	
Athlete	Event	Time Width Height	Rank	Time Width Height	Rank	Time Width Height	Rank	Time Width Height	Rank
Mihter Wendolin	100 metres	14.69	35	did not advance					
