= Evangeleen Ikelap =

Micronesian sprinter

Personal information
- Nationality: Micronesian
- Born: 18 January 1982 (age 44)

Sport
- Sport: Sprinting
- Event(s): 100 metres, 200 metres, 400 metres.
Medal record
Women's athletics
Representing Chuuk
Micronesian Games
Silver medal – second place	1998 Koror	400 m

Evangeleen Ikelap (born 18 January 1982), also spelled as Evangeline Ikelap, (Note: Cited to World Athletics.) is a Micronesian sprinter. Her sister Maria Ikelap is also an Olympic sprinter. Evangeleen would compete at the 1998 Micronesian Games representing Chuuk State in women's athletics. She would compete in the 200 metres and 400 metres, winning a silver medal in the latter event. She would also be entered in the 100 metres but would not start in the event.

Eventually, she represented the Federated States of Micronesia at the 2004 Summer Olympics in the women's 100 metres. She would finish seventh in her heat with a time not enough to progress further. She would also compete at the 2005 World Championships in Athletics competing in the same event. Though, she would place last in her heat and would again not advance further.

== Biography ==
Evangeleen Ikelap was born on 18 January 1982. Her sister Maria Ikelap is a sprinter who would compete at the 2008 Summer Olympics in Beijing, China.

Evangeleen would compete at the 1998 Micronesian Games held in Koror, Palau, representing Chuuk State in women's athletics. She would compete in the women's 200 metres against five other competitors and would place last with a time of 29.49 seconds. Her next competition would be the women's 400 metres, again against five other competitors. She would place second with a time of 1:04.76, earning the silver medal. Ikelap would also be entered in the women's 100 metres but did not start in the event.

Ikelap would compete at the 2004 Summer Olympics in Athens, Greece, representing the Federated States of Micronesia in women's athletics. She would compete in the heats of the women's 100 metres on 20 August. There, she would place seventh in her heat with a time of 13.50 seconds; she would not advance to the quarterfinals of the event.

In 2005, she would set a personal best in the 100 metres with a time of 13.42 seconds. In the same year, she would also compete at the 2005 World Championships in Athletics held in Helsinki, Finland. She would compete in the heats of the women's 100 metres against five other competitors. She would finish last in her heat with a time of 13.51 seconds and would not advance to the quarterfinals of the event.
