= Jennifer Chieng =

American-Micronesian boxer and mixed martial arts fighter

- Born: Jennifer Dugwen Chieng; 29 April 1986 (age 40); Maryland, USA
- Nationality: Federated States of Micronesia
- Height: 1.61 m (5 ft 3 in)
- Weight: Lightweight (boxing); Strawweight (MMA)
- Years active: 2008–present (boxing); 2018-present (MMA)

Mixed martial arts record
- Total: 3
- Wins: 1
- By knockout: 1
- Losses: 2
- By decision: 2

Jennifer Dugwen Chieng (born April 29, 1986) is an American-born boxer and mixed martial artist who represents the Federated States of Micronesia in sports. She competed at the 2016 Summer Olympics in the women's boxing - lightweight event, in which she was eliminated in the round of 16 by Mikaela Mayer. She was the flag bearer for her country at the Parade of Nations.

== Mixed martial arts career ==
=== Bellator MMA ===
Chieng made her pro MMA debut on Oct. 13, 2018 at Bellator 208 with a TKO victory over Jessica Ruiz.

Chieng faced Alyssa Linduska on May 11, 2022 at Invicta FC 47. She lost the bout via unanimous decision.

== Mixed martial arts record ==
Professional record breakdown
3 matches	1 win	2 losses
By knockout	1	0
By decision	0	2

Res.	Record	Opponent	Method	Event	Date	Round	Time	Location	Notes
Loss	1–2	Alyssa Linduska	Decision (unanimous)	Invicta FC 47: Ducote vs. Zappitella	May 11, 2022	3	5:00	Kansas City, Kansas, United States	
Loss	1–1	Helen Peralta	Decision (unanimous)	Invicta FC 42: Cummins vs. Zappitella	September 17, 2020	3	5:00	Kansas City, Kansas, United States	
Win	1–0	Jessica Ruiz	TKO (strikes)	Bellator 208	October 13, 2018	1	1:22	Uniondale, New York, U.S.	

Olympic Games
Preceded by Manuel Minginfel	Flagbearer for Federated States of Micronesia; Rio de Janeiro 2016	Succeeded by Incumbent
