= Federated States of Micronesia at the 2017 World Aquatics Championships =

- Flag of the Federated States of Micronesia
- FINA code: FSM
- National federation: Federated States of Micronesia Swimming Association

in Budapest, Hungary
- Competitors: 3 in 1 sport
- Medals: Gold 0 Silver 0 Bronze 0 Total 0

World Aquatics Championships appearances
- 2003; 2005; 2007; 2009; 2011; 2013; 2015; 2017; 2019; 2022; 2023; 2024

The Federated States of Micronesia competed at the 2017 World Aquatics Championships in Budapest, Hungary from 14 July to 30 July.

== Swimming ==
The Federated States of Micronesia have received a Universality invitation from FINA to send three swimmers (two men and one woman) to the World Championships.

Athlete	Event	Heat		Semifinal		Final	
Athlete	Event	Time	Rank	Time	Rank	Time	Rank
Dionisio Augustine	Men's 50 m freestyle	26.76	110	did not advance			
Dionisio Augustine	Men's 50 m breaststroke	32.28	66	did not advance			
Kaleo Kihleng	Men's 100 m freestyle	56.79	97	did not advance			
Kaleo Kihleng	Men's 50 m butterfly	27.98	73	did not advance			
Kestra Kihleng	Women's 50 m freestyle	32.10	79	did not advance			
Kestra Kihleng	Women's 50 m butterfly	33.06	54	did not advance			
