= Lihen Jonas =

Micronesian sprinter

Personal information
- Born: 22 October 1998 (age 27) Federated States of Micronesia

Sport
- Sport: Track and field
- Updated on 29 August 2015

Lihen Jonas (born 22 October 1998) is a female sprinter from Federated States of Micronesia. She competed in the Women's 100 metres event at the 2015 World Championships in Athletics in Beijing, China.

== See also ==
- Federated States of Micronesia at the 2015 World Championships in Athletics
