= 2024 Oceania Swimming Championships =

- Host city: Gold Coast, Australia
- Date(s): 21–24 April
- Venue(s): Gold Coast Aquatic Centre
- Nations participating: 14
- Events: 46

The 2024 Oceania Swimming Championships was held from 21 to 24 April 2024 at the Gold Coast Aquatic Centre in Gold Coast, Queensland, Australia.

Following the cancellation of both the 2020 and 2022 competitions due to the COVID-19 pandemic in Oceania, this championships became the thirteenth edition of the event as well as the third to be held in Australia.

== Participating nations ==
A total of fourteen teams participated at the 2024 championships.

- American Samoa
- Australia (16) (Host)
- Cook Islands
- Federated States of Micronesia
- Fiji
- Guam
- New Zealand
- Northern Mariana Islands
- Palau
- Papua New Guinea
- Samoa
- Solomon Islands
- Tonga
- Vanuatu

== Medal table ==
* Host nation (Australia)

Rank	Nation	Gold	Silver	Bronze	Total
1	Australia*	39	8	7	54
2	New Zealand	6	10	3	19
3	American Samoa	1	1	0	2
4	Fiji	0	5	8	13
5	Samoa	0	3	8	11
6	Papua New Guinea	0	3	5	8
7	Tonga	0	2	3	5
8	Cook Islands	0	2	0	2
9	Micronesia	0	1	3	4
10	Guam	0	1	0	1
10	Palau	0	1	0	1
12	Northern Mariana Islands	0	0	1	1
Totals (12 entries)		46	37	38	121

== Event summary ==
=== Men's events ===
Event	Gold		Silver		Bronze	
50m freestyle	Jack Hendy; New Zealand	23.13	Chris Elson; New Zealand	23.19	Jackson Anderson; Australia	23.54
100m freestyle	Chris Elson; New Zealand Charlie Russell; Australia	51.25	Not awarded		Jackson Anderson; Australia	51.31
200m freestyle	Charlie Russell; Australia	1:52.31	Lucas Fackerell; Australia	1:52.58	Kai Gilbert; Australia	1:52.68
400m freestyle	Lucas Fackerell; Australia	3:59.44	Kai Gilbert; Australia	4:07.74	Kyler Kihleng; Micronesia	4:39.35
800m freestyle	Lucas Fackerell; Australia	8:21.48				
1500m freestyle	Lucas Fackerell; Australia	16:13.27				
50m backstroke	Jack Hendy; New Zealand	26.30	Samuel Hicks; Australia	26.99	Kokoro Frost; Samoa	27.50 NR
100m backstroke	Samuel Hicks; Australia	58.44	Alan Uhi; Tonga	59.90	Jazz Teuhema; Tonga	1:00.26
200m backstroke	Samuel Hicks; Australia	2:21.58				
50m breaststroke	Micah Masei; American Samoa	29.00	Tasi Limtiaco; Micronesia	29.26	Thomas Sutherland; Australia	29.57
100m breaststroke	Thomas Sutherland; Australia	1:04.25	Micah Masei; American Samoa	1:04.64	Tasi Limtiaco; Micronesia	1:04.79
200m breaststroke	Thomas Sutherland; Australia	2:24.88	Thomas Chen; Papua New Guinea	2:36.46	La'auli Hamilton; Samoa	2:39.53
50m butterfly	Chris Elson; New Zealand	24.31	Jack Hendy; New Zealand	24.89	Johann Stickland; Samoa	25.05
100m butterfly	Chris Elson; New Zealand	54.52	Jake Tysoe; Australia	55.72	Joel Crampton; New Zealand	56.69
200m butterfly	Jake Tysoe; Australia	2:02.95	Joel Crampton; New Zealand	2:03.34	Erik Tokona; Fiji	2:24.57
200m individual medley	Grayson Doig; Australia	2:06.60	Israel Poppe; Guam	2:14.01	Taiyo Akimaru; Northern Mariana Islands	2:18.17
400 individual medley	Grayson Doig; Australia	4:34.80				
4 × 100m freestyle relay	Australia	3:28.14	Samoa	3:37.98	Fiji	3:45.09
4 × 200m freestyle relay	Australia	7:45.66	Palau	8:45.18	Fiji	9:00.25
4 × 100m medley relay	Australia	3:53.59	Samoa	4:04.24	Fiji	4:16.58

=== Women's events ===
Event	Gold		Silver		Bronze	
50m freestyle	Sylvia Czajko; Australia	25.52	Lillie McPherson; Australia	26.24	Phoebe Nelson; New Zealand	26.32
100m freestyle	Lillie McPherson; Australia Sylvia Czajko; Australia	56.07	Not awarded		Jesse Welsh; New Zealand	57.54
200m freestyle	Lillie McPherson; Australia	2:02.40	Marseleima Moss; Fiji	2:20.47	Man Thoms; Fiji	2:25.79
400m freestyle	Amelie Smith; Australia	4:27.71	Marseleima Moss; Fiji	4:56.79	Charissa Panuve; Tonga	5:03.89
800m freestyle	Neve Tassicker; New Zealand	8:59.57				
1500m freestyle	Amelie Smith; Australia	17:04.21				
50m backstroke	Jessica Wilson; Australia	29.67	Salani Sa'aga; Samoa	31.41	Jhnayali Tokome-Garap; Papua New Guinea	32.29
100m backstroke	Jessica Wilson; Australia	1:02.38	Jesse Welsh; New Zealand	1:03.81	Salani Sa'aga; Samoa	1:07.79
200m backstroke	Jessica Wilson; Australia	2:17.62	Jesse Welsh; New Zealand	2:18.64	Nafanua Hamilton; Samoa	2:29.05
50m breaststroke	Olympia Pope; Australia	32.46	Lanihei Connolly; Cook Islands	32.54	Kelera Mudunasoko; Fiji	33.83
100m breaststroke	Olympia Pope; Australia	1:09.57	Lanihei Connolly; Cook Islands	1:11.16	Lilla Ribot de Bresac; Australia	1:13.33
200m breaststroke	Olympia Pope; Australia	2:32.23	Lilla Ribot de Bresac; Australia	2:37.75	Kelera Mudunasoko; Fiji	2:43.65
50m butterfly	Jessica Cole; Australia	27.72	Isabella Osborn; Australia	27.97	Georgia-Leigh Vele; Papua New Guinea	29.57
100m butterfly	Jessica Cole; Australia	59.68	Esme Paterson; New Zealand	1:01.32	Lillie McPherson; Australia	1:01.40
200m butterfly	Jessica Cole; Australia	2:13.78	Neve Tassicker; New Zealand	2:16.18	Isabella Osborn; Australia	2:17.07
200m individual medley	Amelie Smith; Australia	2:21.77	Patricia Verebasaga; Fiji	2:39.94	Joanna Chen; Papua New Guinea	2:41.53
400 individual medley	Amelie Smith; Australia	4:52.04	Neve Tassicker; New Zealand	5:05.43		
4 × 100m freestyle relay	Australia	3:52.88	Papua New Guinea	4:14.43	Fiji	4:20.80
4 × 200m freestyle relay	Australia	8:37.40	Fiji	9:43.89	Papua New Guinea	9:43.93
4 × 100m medley relay	Australia	4:14.10	Fiji	4:43.41	Papua New Guinea	4:48.41

=== Mixed events ===
Event	Gold		Silver		Bronze	
4 × 50m freestyle relay	Australia	1:36.85	New Zealand	1:38.52	Samoa	1:41.38
4 × 100m freestyle relay	Australia	3:36.50	Papua New Guinea	3:52.20	Tonga	3:53.51
4 × 50m medley relay	Australia	1:49.63	New Zealand	1:51.51	Samoa	1:54.77
4 × 100m medley relay	Australia	4:00.18	Federated States of Micronesia	4:29.47	Tonga	4:29.63
