= Comité Territorial Olympique et Sportif des Iles Wallis et Futuna =

Olympic Committee for Wallis and Futuna

- Country/Region: Wallis and Futuna
- Code: WLF
- Continental Association: ONOC
- Headquarters: Hahake, France
- President: Etuato Mulikihaamea
- Secretary General: Yvanoel Kaikilekofe

The Comité Territorial Olympique et Sportif des Iles Wallis et Futuna (CTOSWF) is a National Olympic Committee. It is an associate member of the Oceania National Olympic Committees. It represents Wallis and Futuna at sporting events such as the Pacific Games and the Pacific Mini Games. However, the association does not participate in the Olympic Games.

== See also ==
- Wallis and Futuna at the 2011 Pacific Games
- Wallis and Futuna at the 2015 Pacific Games
- Wallis and Futuna at the 2019 Pacific Games
