= Olympic Committee of French Polynesia =

National Olympic Committee

Surf in Paea, French Polynesia

The Olympic Committee of French Polynesia is the national Olympic committee of French Polynesia, a French overseas country. It is chaired by Louis PROVOST.

== Committee ==
Created on January 3, 1973, as an association under the law of July 1, 1901, as a "Territorial Sports Committee" (CTS) then "Territorial Olympic and Sports Committee" (CTOS), it became the COPF by decision of September 2, 2000. Its headquarters is in Pirae and its statutes, following a deliberation of the Assembly of French Polynesia dated October 14, 1999, are decided by the Polynesian Council of Ministers.

Its social purpose is to bring together all the sports federations of French Polynesia by coordinating their efforts and to represent Polynesian sport to official bodies such as the Pacific Games Council, the Pacific Community, to the exclusion of international federations and organizations which directly depend on it. He liaises with the French National Olympic and Sports Committee. The COPF is not a member of the International Olympic Committee (IOC) but effectively participates in international competitions (world championships), with the sole exception of the Olympic Games, with its own flag and anthem.
