= Niue Island Sports Commonwealth Games Association =

Unrecognized National Olympic Committee

- Country: Niue
- Code: NIU
- Created: 1976
- Continental Association: ONOC
- President: Maru Talagi
- Secretary General: Hagen Siosikefu

The Niue Island Sports Commonwealth Games Association (NISCGA) is an unrecognized National Olympic Committee and associate member of the Oceania National Olympic Committees. The organization is the national federation for all sports within Niue and represents the country at the Commonwealth Games, making its debut at the Manchester 2002. The association also organises the country's participation in the Commonwealth Youth Games. It is a signatory to the World Anti-Doping Agency.

During the 2015 Pacific Games, the nation won a silver medal at the Female Lawn Bowls event and Individual BodyBuilding +100kg Male event.

== See also ==
- Niue at the Commonwealth Games
- Niue Athletics Association
