= Comité Territorial Olympique et Sportif de Nouvelle-Calédonie =

Olympic committee for New Caledonia

- Country: New Caledonia
- Code: NCL
- Continental Association: ONOC
- Headquarters: Nouméa, France
- President: Christophe Dabin
- Secretary General: Antoine Dahlia

The Comité Territorial Olympique et Sportif de Nouvelle-Calédonie (CTOS) is a National Olympic Committee. The committee is an associate member of the Oceania National Olympic Committees. It represents New Caledonia in sporting events such as the Pacific Games and the Pacific Mini Games. However, the association does not participate in the Olympic Games.

== History ==
The organization was founded in 1961. In 2006, it joined the Oceania National Olympic Committees.

== See also ==
- New Caledonia at the 2011 Pacific Games
- New Caledonia at the 2015 Pacific Games
- New Caledonia at the 2019 Pacific Games
- New Caledonia at the 2023 Pacific Games
