= Margie Winter =

Micronesian swimmer

Personal information
- Born: 20 February 2002 (age 24)

Sport
- Sport: Swimming

Margie Winter (born 20 February 2002) is a Micronesian swimmer.

In 2018, she competed in the girls' 50 metre butterfly and girls' 50 metre freestyle events at the Summer Youth Olympics in Buenos Aires, Argentina. In both events she did not advance to compete in the semi-finals.

She represented Federated States of Micronesia at the 2019 World Aquatics Championships held in Gwangju, South Korea. She competed in the women's 50 metre freestyle and women's 100 metre freestyle events. In both events she did not advance to compete in the semi-finals. She also competed in the 4 × 100 metre mixed freestyle relay and 4 × 100 metre mixed medley relay events.
