= Federated States of Micronesia at the 2009 World Championships in Athletics =

- WA code: FSM

in Berlin
- Competitors: 1
- Medals: Gold 0 Silver 0 Bronze 0 Total 0

World Championships in Athletics appearances
- 1997; 1999; 2001; 2003; 2005; 2007; 2009; 2011; 2013; 2015; 2017; 2019; 2022; 2023

The Federated States of Micronesia competed at the 2009 World Championships in Athletics from 15–23 August. A team of 1 athlete was announced in preparation for the competition.

== Team selection ==
Track and road events

Event	Athletes	
Event	Men	Women
100 metres	Yondan Namelo	
