= Northern Marianas Amateur Sports Association =

Olympic committee for Northern Mariana Islands

- Country/Region: Northern Mariana Islands
- Code: MNP
- Continental Association: ONOC
- Headquarters: Saipan, United States
- President: Jerry Tan
- Secretary General: Valerie Hofschneider

The Northern Marianas Amateur Sports Association is a National Olympic Committee. It is an associate member of the Oceania National Olympic Committees. It represents the Northern Mariana Islands in sporting events such as the Pacific Games and the Pacific Mini Games. However, the association does not participate in the Olympic Games.

== See also ==
- Northern Mariana Islands at the 2011 Pacific Games
- Northern Mariana Islands at the 2015 Pacific Games
- Northern Mariana Islands at the 2019 Pacific Games
- Northern Mariana Islands at the 2023 Pacific Games
