= Norfolk Island Amateur Sports & Commonwealth Games Association =

Olympic committee for Norfolk Island

- Country/Region: Norfolk Island
- Code: NFK
- Continental Association: ONOC
- Headquarters: Norfolk Island, Australia
- President: Malcolm Tarrant
- Secretary General: Jacqueline Grundy

The Norfolk Island Amateur Sports & Commonwealth Games Association (NIASCGA) is a National Olympic Committee. It is an associate member of the Oceania National Olympic Committees. It represents Norfolk Island in sporting events such as the Commonwealth Games, the Pacific Games, and the Pacific Mini Games. However, the association does not participate in the Olympic Games. The organization is also a signatory of the World Anti-Doping Agency's Code.

== See also ==
- Norfolk Island at the Commonwealth Games
- Norfolk Island at the 2011 Pacific Games
- Norfolk Island at the 2015 Pacific Games
- Norfolk Island at the 2019 Pacific Games
- Norfolk Island at the 2023 Pacific Games
