= Kerson Hadley =

Micronesian swimmer

Personal information
- Born: May 22, 1989 (age 35); Pohnpei
- Height: 1.68 m (5 ft 6 in)
- Weight: 68 kg (150 lb)

Sport
- Country: Micronesia
- Sport: Swimming
- Event: Men's 50m Freestyle
- Updated on 7 August 2012

Kerson Hadley (born May 22, 1989 in Pohnpei) is a Micronesian swimmer. He competed at the 2008 Summer Olympics. He finished in 70th place in a time of 25.34s.

He qualified for the 2012 Summer Olympics in the Men's 50 metre freestyle where he ranked 40th. In London Olympics 2012 he won his heat in a time of 24.82s but it wasn't quick enough to qualify to the next round.
