= Federated States of Micronesia Athletic Association =

Governing body of athletics in Micronesia

- Sport: Athletics
- Abbreviation: FSMAA
- Founded: 1996
- Affiliation: IAAF
- Affiliation date: 1997
- Regional affiliation: OAA
- Headquarters: Kolonia, Pohnpei
- President: Ted Rutun
- Vice president: Marcellus Akapito
- Secretary: Jim Tobin

Official website
- www.foxsportspulse.com/assoc_page.cgi?c=2-1143-0-0-0
- (Federated States of Micronesia)

The Federated States of Micronesia Athletic Association (FSMAA) is the governing body for the sport of athletics in the Federated States of Micronesia (FSM).

== History ==
Athletes from Yap, Truk (now Chuuk), Ponape (now Pohnpei) and Kusaie (now Kosrae), but then part of the Ponape District (then still being part of the Trust Territory of the Pacific Islands), participated already in three separate teams at the 1969 Micronesian Games, at the 1975 South Pacific Games as part of a combined Micronesia team, and also after re-establishment of the Micronesian Games in 1990, in four separate teams.

It is reported, that a FSM Athletics Federation was already formed many years ago, but the official foundation of FSMAA occurred only in 1996, and its affiliation to the IAAF in the year 1997.

Julio Akapito from Chuuk formerly served as president of FSMAA.

Current president is Ted Rutun from Yap.

== Affiliations ==
- International Association of Athletics Federations (IAAF)
- Oceania Athletics Association (OAA)

Moreover, it is part of the following national organizations:

- Federated States of Micronesia National Olympic Committee (FSMNOC)

== Members ==
FSMAA (most probably) comprises the associations of the four member states of Micronesia.

Flag	State	Organisation
Chuuk State	Chuuk	Chuuk Track and Field Association
Kosrae	Kosrae	
Pohnpei State	Pohnpei	
Yap State	Yap	Yap Track and Field Association

== National records ==
FSMAA maintains the Micronesian records in athletics.
