= Federated States of Micronesia Olympic Committee =

National Olympic Committee

- Country: Micronesia
- Code: FSM
- Created: 1995
- Recognized: 6 September 1997
- Continental Association: ONOC
- President: Berney Martin
- Secretary General: Jim Tobin

The Federated States of Micronesia National Olympic Committee (IOC code: FSM) is the National Olympic Committee representing Federated States of Micronesia.

== History ==
FSMNOC was created in 1996 and achieved International Olympic Committee (IOC) recognition on 6 September 1997.

In support of its application for the IOC, the Federated States of Micronesia held the first and second FSM Games and started affiliation to international sport federations. In June 1995, the first FSM Games were held on the island of Pohnpei. From 1995 to 1997, seven national sport federations became affiliated with their respective international sport federations. In July 1997, the second FSM Games were held on the island of Kosrae. In June 1997, the FSMNOC formally submitted an application for IOC membership.
