= Taeyanna Adams =

Micronesian swimmer

Personal information
- National team: Federated States of Micronesia
- Born: March 14, 2002 (age 24) Micronesia

Sport
- Sport: Swimming
- Strokes: Breaststroke; Freestyle
- Club: Kona

Taeyanna Adams (born March 14, 2002) is a Micronesian swimmer, who is the national record holder in multiple events. She competed in the 100 metre breaststroke event at the delayed 2020 Summer Olympics.

== Personal life ==
Adams has Japanese and Pohnpeian heritage. In 2020, she moved to Hawaii. Aside from swimming, she does CrossFit training, and was part of the basketball team at Calvary Christian Academy. She was a member of the North Carolina Tar Heels rowing squad during the 2021–22 and 2022–23 seasons, but did not compete for the team. She was studying biology there.

== Career ==
Adams is the Micronesian record holder in the short course 50 and 100 metres breaststroke events, as well as the standard course 100 metres breaststroke and freestyle events. In Hawaii, she trains at the Kona Aquatics Club.

Adams competed at the 2018 Oceania Swimming Championships, finishing last in the 50 metres breaststroke event. She was also part of the Micronesian team that finished last in the 4 × 100 metres freestyle relay. At the 2018 FINA World Swimming Championships (25 m), she set a national record of 37.00 seconds in the 50 metres breaststroke event, and also competed in the 100 metres breaststroke competition. She competed in the 100 metre breastroke event at the 2019 World Aquatics Championships, finishing 53rd out of 55 in the heats.

Adams was given a wildcard place for the 100 metre breaststroke event at the delayed 2020 Summer Olympics, competing for the Federated States of Micronesia. She was Micronesia's flag bearer at the Games' opening ceremony. After arriving in Tokyo, Adams trained with swimmers from Guam. At the Games, Adams finished fourth in her heat, and 41st overall. Her time of 1:25.26 was a national record, beating her own previous best. Nevertheless, Adams did not qualify for the semi-finals of the competition, as only the top 16 finishers progressed. Later in the year, she competed in the 100 metre breastroke event at the 2021 FINA World Swimming Championships (25 m). She went out in the heats. She competed in the mixed 4 × 50 metre freestyle relay at the 2022 FINA World Swimming Championships (25 m).
