= Manuel Minginfel =

Micronesian weightlifter

Personal information
- Nationality: Micronesian
- Born: September 28, 1978 (age 47) Yap
- Height: 1.58 m (5 ft 2 in)
- Weight: 62 kg (137 lb)

Sport
- Country: Federated States of Micronesia
Medal record
Men's weightlifting
Representing Federated States of Micronesia
Oceania Championships
Gold medal – first place	2006 Apia	62 kg
Gold medal – first place	2007 Apia	62 kg
Gold medal – first place	2008 Auckland	62 kg
Gold medal – first place	2012 Apia	62 kg
Gold medal – first place	2015 Port Moresby	69 kg
Silver medal – second place	2010 Suva	62 kg
Silver medal – second place	2011 Darwin (Note: Arafura Games also)	62 kg
Silver medal – second place	2013 Brisbane	62 kg
Silver medal – second place	2016 Suva	69 kg
Bronze medal – third place	2014 Le Mont-Dore	69 kg
Pacific Games
Gold medal – first place	1999 Guam	56 kg
Gold medal – first place	2003 Suva	62 kg
Gold medal – first place	2007 Apia	56 kg
Gold medal – first place	2011 Nouméa	62 kg
Gold medal – first place	2015 Port Moresby	69 kg

Manuel Minginfel (born September 28, 1978) is a former weightlifter representing the Federated States of Micronesia.

In the 62 kg category, he ranked 10th at the 2004 Summer Olympics, 7th at the 2005 World Weightlifting Championships, and 4th at the 2006 World Weightlifting Championships.

At the 2008 Oceania Championships he won the gold medal in the 62 kg category. He also represented the Federated States of Micronesia in weightlifting at the 2008 Summer Olympics in Beijing, China, where he ranked 11th in the 62 kg category. He was also his country's flag bearer during the Games' opening ceremony.

He competed in the 2012 Summer Olympics where he ranked #10 in the Men's 62 kg category.

Minginfel is a native of Yap. He set a new record snatch in the men's 56 kilo category at the South Pacific Games in Samoa in 2007.

== Major results ==
Year	Venue	Weight	Snatch (kg)					Clean & Jerk (kg)					Total	Rank
Year	Venue	Weight	1	2	3	Result	Rank	1	2	3	Result	Rank	Total	Rank
Representing Federated States of Micronesia
Summer Olympics
2012	London, United Kingdom	62 kg	122	127	~~130~~	127	11	~~158~~	~~158~~	158	158	10	285	10
2008	Beijing, China	62 kg	115	120	~~123~~	120	14	145	150	155	155	10	275	11
2004	Athens, Greece	62 kg	~~115.0~~	115.0	120.0	120.0	11	~~147.5~~	147.5	152.5	152.5	10	272.5	10
2000	Sydney, Australia	56 kg	~~97.5~~	~~97.5~~	~~97.5~~	—	—	—	—	—	—	—	—	—
Pacific Games
2015	Port Moresby, Papua New Guinea	69 kg	112	117	120	120	1st place, gold medalist(s)	146	150	156	156	2nd place, silver medalist(s)	276	1st place, gold medalist(s)
2011	Nouméa, New Caledonia	62 kg	110	115	~~120~~	115	1st place, gold medalist(s)	140	145	150	150	1st place, gold medalist(s)	265	1st place, gold medalist(s)
2007	Apia, Samoa	56 kg	—N/a	—N/a	—N/a	124	1st place, gold medalist(s)	—N/a	—N/a	—N/a	152	1st place, gold medalist(s)	276	1st place, gold medalist(s)
2003	Suva, Fiji	62 kg	—N/a	—N/a	—N/a	117.5	1st place, gold medalist(s)	—N/a	—N/a	—N/a	150.0	1st place, gold medalist(s)	267.5	(gold)
1999	Guam	56 kg	—N/a	—N/a	—N/a	95.0	1st place, gold medalist(s)	—N/a	—N/a	—N/a	125.0	1st place, gold medalist(s)	220.0	(gold)

== Child Sex abuse controversy and conviction ==
It was reported by herald that a child reported in 2018 that an inappropriate touch has occurred twice, then at age younger than 13. Minginfel initially denied the allegations, but he admitted sexually touching the girl once. He was pleaded guilty to indecent liberties in November 2019 for sexual contact with a girl incapable of consent. He was sentenced the week before in January. On his release from prison, Minginfel will be on probation for three years and will also have to register as a sex offender.
