= Scott Fiti =

Micronesian athlete (born 1995)

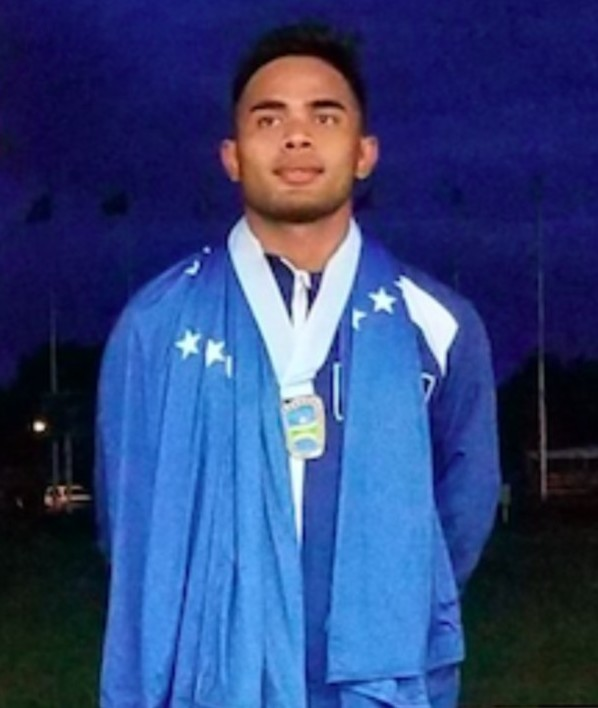
- Fiti in 2021

Personal information
- Full name: Scott James Fiti
- Nationality: American, Micronesian
- Born: July 17, 1995 (age 30) Tamuning, Guam
- Height: 1.74 m (5 ft 9 in)

Sport
- Country: FS Micronesia
- Sport: Athletics
- Events: 100 metres; 200 metres

Achievements and titles
- Personal bests: 11.10s (100 m); 22.24s (200 m)

Scott James Fiti (born July 17, 1995) is a sprinter. Born in Guam, he represented the Federated States of Micronesia at the 2020 and 2024 Olympic Games.

He represents Chuuk State. Fiti finished in 5th place for the men's 100m in qualification heat 3 in the 2019 IAAF World Championships in Doha running 11.34 seconds.

After being chosen for the 2020 Summer Games, he was given the honour of being the flag bearer for the nation in the opening ceremony.

He later competed at the 2023 World Athletics Championships, in Budapest in the 100 metres.

He competed in the 2024 World Athletics Indoor Championships – Men's 60 metres race and ran a personal best time of 7.52 seconds. He competed in the 100 metres at the 2024 Paris Olympics.
