= Debra Daniel =

Micronesian swimmer

Personal information
- Born: 4 March 1991 (age 35) Pohnpei, Micronesia
- Height: 1.53 m (5 ft 0 in)
- Weight: 68 kg (150 lb)

Sport
- Country: Federated States of Micronesia
- Sport: Swimming
- Event: 50m Freestyle

Debra Daniel (born 4 March 1991 in Pohnpei) is a Micronesian swimmer. At the 2008 Summer Olympics, she competed in the women's 50 m freestyle, failing to advance beyond the first round. She competed for Micronesia at the 2012 Summer Olympics and ranked 56th. Daniel did not advance to the semifinals. She also competed in the women's 50 m freestyle at the 2016 Summer Olympics and finished 72nd, again failing to advance.
