= Tasi Limtiaco =

Micronesia male swimmer

Personal information
- Born: 4 January 1994 (age 32) Federated States of Micronesia

Sport
- Sport: Swimming

Tasi Limtiaco, OLY (born 4 January 1994) is a Micronesian swimmer, He competed in the men's 200 metre individual medley event at the 2020 Summer Olympics.

== Life ==
He is the national record holder in multiple events. He studied abroad in Japan and attended Yamanashi Gakuin University. While in university, he joined the swim team.

== Competition record ==
Year	Competition	Venue	Position	Event	Notes
Representing the Federated States of Micronesia
2019	World Aquatics Championships	Gwangju, South Korea	65th	100 metre breaststroke	1:05.10
2019	World Aquatics Championships	Gwangju, South Korea	50th	200 metre breaststroke	2:23.26
2019	World Aquatics Championships	Gwangju, South Korea	33rd	4×100 metre mixed freestyle relay	4:07.97
2019	World Aquatics Championships	Gwangju, South Korea	32nd	4×100 metre mixed medley relay	4:30.16
2020	Olympics	Tokyo, Japan	45th	200 metre individual medley	2:07.69

== Best Results ==
Event	Time	Date	Venue	Notes
50 metre freestyle	25.28	7 April 2019	THA	
100 metre freestyle	56.42	9 April 2019	THA	
50 metre backstroke	29.66	21 June 2019	SGP	NR
100 metre backstroke	1:04.60	23 October 2020	THA	
200 metre backstroke	2:18.88	19 June 2019	SGP	NR
50 metre butterfly	26.68	26 June 2018	PNG	NR
200 metre individual medley	2:06.87	24 October 2020	THA	
