= National Olympic Committee =

National constituent of the worldwide Olympic movement

A National Olympic Committee (NOC) is a national constituent of the worldwide Olympic movement. Subject to the controls of the International Olympic Committee, NOCs are responsible for organizing their athletes' participation in the Olympic Games. They may nominate cities within their respective areas as candidates for future Olympic Games. NOCs also promote the development of athletes and the training of coaches and officials at the national level within their national territories.

== National Olympic Committees ==
As of 2026, there are 206 National Olympic Committees. These include each of the 193 member states of the United Nations, one UN General Assembly observer state (Palestine), two states without UN recognition (Kosovo and Taiwan (Note: Designated as Chinese Taipei by the IOC.)) and one associated state of New Zealand (the Cook Islands).

There are also nine dependent territories with recognized NOCs: four territories of the United States (American Samoa, Guam, Puerto Rico, and the United States Virgin Islands), three British Overseas Territories (Bermuda, the British Virgin Islands, and the Cayman Islands), one constituent country of the Kingdom of the Netherlands (Aruba) and one special administrative region of China (Hong Kong).

Prior to 1996, rules for recognizing dependent territories or constituent countries as separate countries within the IOC were not as strict as those within the United Nations, which allowed these territories to field teams separately from their sovereign state. Following an amendment to the Olympic Charter in 1996, NOC recognition can only be granted after recognition as an independent country by the international community. Since the rule does not apply retroactively, the dependent territories and constituent countries which were recognized before the rule change are allowed to continue sending separate teams to the Olympics, while the Faroe Islands and Macau send their own Paralympic teams.

The only state which thus qualifies to participate in the future is the Vatican City, a UN General Assembly observer state. Niue, an associated state of New Zealand, could also be eligible as it conducts its own foreign relations and participates independently in UN specialized agencies and treaties, though this is unclear. Currently, all other remaining states are ineligible to join the IOC as they are not recognized by a majority of United Nations member countries. Constituent countries and dependent territories such as Curaçao, the Faroe Islands, Gibraltar, Greenland, Macau, New Caledonia and French Polynesia can also no longer be recognized, so athletes from these territories can only participate in the Olympics as part of their parent nation's national team. This rule also applies to territories experiencing a change in status – the Netherlands Antilles Olympic Committee was dissolved at the 123rd IOC session in July 2011 as the Netherlands Antilles ceased to exist in 2010.

For those countries and territories that are part of the Commonwealth of Nations, their National Olympic Committees usually also serve as the members of the Commonwealth Games Association, though not for the constituent countries of the United Kingdom (England, Scotland, Wales and Northern Ireland), nor for Canada or Australia, who maintain separate organisations for Commonwealth and Olympic sport. For the other Commonwealth members, their NOCs are responsible for organising and overseeing their national teams at the Commonwealth Games.

=== Listed NOCs ===
This section lists the current:

- 206 National Olympic Committees who are recognised by the International Olympic Committee, and so are the members of the Association of National Olympic Committees.
- 7 National Olympic Committees who are recognised by their continental Olympic associations, but are not recognised by the International Olympic Committee (Italics).

The ANOC members are eligible to enter the Olympic Games. Some National Olympic Committees who are members of a continental Olympic association but not ANOC members compete in continental-level and subregional-level tournaments. These committees, however, are not allowed to participate in the Olympic Games.

The five continental Olympic associations are:

- Africa – Association of National Olympic Committees of Africa (ANOCA)
- America – Pan American Sports Organization (PASO)
- Asia – Olympic Council of Asia (OCA)
- Europe – European Olympic Committees (EOC)
- Oceania – Oceania National Olympic Committees (ONOC)

The IOC runs the Summer Olympic Games and the Winter Olympic Games as competitions in which all IOC-recognized NOCs can participate. Each continent also runs its own championships for their members:

- ANOCA – African Games
- PASO – Pan American Games and Pan American Winter Games
- OCA – Asian Games and Asian Winter Games
- EOC – European Games
- ONOC – Pacific Games

While not continental unions in themselves, the Union of Arab National Olympic Committees (UANOC) and International Committee of Mediterranean Games (CIJM) organize multi-sport events between Arab League countries and Mediterranean countries respectively. All 22 National Olympic Committees that form the UANOC and the 26 from CIJM are also members of either the ANOCA, EOC or OCA and are eligible to send their athletes to either the African, European or Asian Games. National Olympic Committees from the UANOC and CIJM are noted in the list below.

==== Africa (ANOCA) ====
- (Algeria) Algeria^{1} ^{2}
- Angola
- Benin
- Botswana ^{3}
- Burkina Faso
- Burundi
- Cameroon ^{3}
- Cape Verde
- Central African Republic
- Chad
- (Comoros) Comoros^{1}
- (Republic of the Congo) Congo
- (Democratic Republic of the Congo) DR Congo
- (Ivory Coast) Côte d'Ivoire
- (Djibouti) Djibouti^{1}
- (Egypt) Egypt^{12}
- Equatorial Guinea
- Eritrea
- Eswatini ^{3}
- Ethiopia
- Gabon ^{3}
- (The Gambia) Gambia ^{3}
- Ghana ^{3}
- Guinea
- Guinea-Bissau
- Kenya ^{3}
- Lesotho ^{3}
- Liberia
- (Libya) Libya^{12}
- Madagascar
- Malawi ^{3}
- Mali
- (Mauritania) Mauritania^{1}
- Mauritius ^{3}
- (Morocco) Morocco^{12}
- Mozambique ^{3}
- Namibia ^{3}
- Niger
- Nigeria ^{3}
- Rwanda ^{3}
- São Tomé and Príncipe
- Senegal
- Seychelles ^{3}
- Sierra Leone ^{3}
- (Somalia) Somalia^{1}
- South Africa ^{3}
- South Sudan
- (Sudan) Sudan^{1}
- United Republic of Tanzania ^{3}
- Togo ^{3}
- (Tunisia) Tunisia^{12}
- Uganda ^{3}
- Zambia ^{3}
- Zimbabwe ^{3}

1: National Olympic Committee is a member of the UANOC.
2: National Olympic Committee is a member of the CIJM.
3: National Olympic Committee is also National Commonwealth Games Association

==== Americas (Panam Sports) ====
- (Antigua and Barbuda) Antigua and Barbuda^{1}
- Argentina
- Aruba
- (The Bahamas) Bahamas^{1}
- (Barbados) Barbados^{1}
- (Belize) Belize^{1}
- (Bermuda) Bermuda^{1}
- Bolivia
- Brazil
- (British Virgin Islands) British Virgin Islands^{1}
- (Canada) Canada^{1}
- (Cayman Islands) Cayman Islands^{1}
- Chile
- Colombia
- Costa Rica
- Cuba
- (Dominica) Dominica^{1}
- Dominican Republic
- Ecuador
- El Salvador
- (Grenada) Grenada^{1}
- Guatemala
- (Guyana) Guyana^{1}
- Haiti
- Honduras
- (Jamaica) Jamaica^{1}
- Mexico
- Nicaragua
- Panama
- Paraguay
- Peru
- Puerto Rico
- (Saint Kitts and Nevis) Saint Kitts and Nevis^{1}
- (Saint Lucia) Saint Lucia^{1}
- (Saint Vincent and the Grenadines) Saint Vincent and the Grenadines^{1}
- Suriname
- (Trinidad and Tobago) Trinidad and Tobago^{1}
- United States of America
- Uruguay
- Venezuela
- (United States Virgin Islands) Virgin Islands, US

1: National Olympic committee also a member of the Commonwealth Sport

==== Asia (OCA) ====
- (Islamic Republic of Afghanistan) Afghanistan
- (Bahrain) Bahrain^{1}
- (Bangladesh) Bangladesh^{5}
- Bhutan
- (Brunei) Brunei^{5}
- Cambodia
- People's Republic of China
- Hong Kong, China
- (India) India^{5}
- Indonesia
- Iran
- (Iraq) Iraq^{1}
- Japan
- (Jordan) Jordan^{1}
- Kazakhstan
- (North Korea) DPR Korea
- (South Korea) Republic of Korea
- (Kuwait) Kuwait^{1}
- Kyrgyzstan
- Laos
- (Lebanon) Lebanon^{14}
- Macau, China^{2}
- (Malaysia) Malaysia^{5}
- (Maldives) Maldives^{5}
- Mongolia
- Myanmar
- Nepal
- (Oman) Oman^{1}
- (Pakistan) Pakistan^{5}
- (Palestine) Palestine^{1}
- Philippines
- (Qatar) Qatar^{1}
- (Saudi Arabia) Saudi Arabia^{1}
- (Singapore) Singapore^{5}
- (Sri Lanka) Sri Lanka^{5}
- (Syria) Syria^{14}
- (Chinese Taipei) Chinese Taipei^{3}
- Tajikistan
- Thailand
- Timor-Leste
- Turkmenistan
- (United Arab Emirates) United Arab Emirates^{1}
- Uzbekistan
- Vietnam
- (Yemen) Yemen^{1}

1: National Olympic Committee is a member of the UANOC.
2: National Olympic Committee is a member of the OCA but not an ANOC member.
3: Official name used by the IOC, ANOC and OCA for the Republic of China (Taiwan).
4: National Olympic Committee is a member of the CIJM.
5: National Olympic committee also the national Commonwealth Games Association.

==== Europe (EOC) ====
- (Albania) Albania^{2}
- (Andorra) Andorra^{2}
- Armenia
- Austria
- Azerbaijan
- Belarus ^{4}
- Belgium
- (Bosnia and Herzegovina) Bosnia and Herzegovina^{2}
- Bulgaria
- (Croatia) Croatia^{2}
- (Cyprus) Cyprus^{23}
- (Czech Republic) Czechia
- Denmark
- Estonia
- Finland
- (France) France^{2}
- (Georgia (country)) Georgia
- Germany
- (Greece) Greece^{2}
- Hungary
- Iceland
- (Republic of Ireland) Ireland
- (Israel) Israel^{1}
- (Italy) Italy^{2}
- (Kosovo) Kosovo^{2}
- Latvia
- Liechtenstein
- Lithuania
- Luxembourg
- (Malta) Malta^{23}
- Republic of Moldova
- Monaco ^{2}
- Montenegro ^{2}
- Netherlands
- North Macedonia ^{2}
- Norway
- Poland
- Portugal ^{2}
- Romania
- (Russia) Russian Federation^{4}
- San Marino ^{2}
- Serbia ^{2}
- Slovakia
- Slovenia ^{2}
- Spain ^{2}
- Sweden
- Switzerland
- (Turkey) Türkiye ^{2}
- Ukraine
- United Kingdom

1: Israel was a member of the OCA, but was expelled from the organization between 1952 and 1981. Joined the EOC in 1994.
2: National Olympic Committee is a member of the CIJM.
3: National Olympic committee also the national Commonwealth Games Association.
4: National Olympic Committee is suspended by the IOC.

==== Oceania (ONOC) ====
- American Samoa
- Australia
- Cook Islands
- Fiji
- Guam
- Kiribati
- Marshall Islands
- (Federated States of Micronesia) FS Micronesia
- (Nauru) Naoero
- (New Caledonia) New Caledonia^{1}
- New Zealand
- (Niue) Niue^{1}
- (Norfolk Island) Norfolk Island^{1}
- (Northern Mariana Islands) Northern Mariana Islands^{1}
- Palau
- Papua New Guinea
- Samoa
- Solomon Islands
- (French Polynesia) French Polynesia^{1}
- Tonga
- Tuvalu
- Vanuatu
- (Wallis and Futuna) Wallis and Futuna^{1}

1: National Olympic Committee is an associate member of the ONOC but not an ANOC member.

== Divisions ==
The NOCs are all members of the Association of National Olympic Committees (ANOC), which is also split among five continental associations:

Continent	Association	NOCs	Oldest NOC	Newest NOC
Africa	Association of National Olympic Committees of Africa	54	Egypt (1910)	South Sudan (2015)
Americas	Pan American Sports Organization	41	United States (1894)	Dominica (1993); Saint Kitts and Nevis (1993); Saint Lucia (1993)
Asia	Olympic Council of Asia	44	Japan (1912)	Timor-Leste (2003)
Europe	European Olympic Committees	50	France (1894)	Kosovo (2014)
Oceania	Oceania National Olympic Committees	17	Australia (1895)	Tuvalu (2007)

See the article for each continental association for the complete lists of all NOCs.

== Unrecognized National Olympic Committees ==
The Faroe Islands and Macau both have recognized National Paralympic Committees and compete at the Paralympic Games. However, neither territory's National Olympic Committee is recognized by the IOC, so they cannot participate in the Olympics. Macau remains recognized by the Olympic Council of Asia and takes part in the Asian Games.

Other existing countries/regions with unrecognized Olympic committees: Catalonia, Gibraltar, French Polynesia, Niue, New Caledonia, Curaçao, Guadeloupe, French Guiana, Martinique, Sint Maarten, the Northern Mariana Islands, Anguilla, Montserrat, Turks and Caicos Islands, Transnistria, Kurdistan, Northern Cyprus, Somaliland, Abkhazia, and Native Americans.

It was reported in 2014 that South Ossetia intend to establish a National Olympic Committee.

=== Olympic Sport ===
Name of organization	Sport	Non-IOC member is member in world level	Non-IOC member is only member in continental level	Case of United Kingdom
FIFA	Association football	Anguilla, Montserrat, Turks and Caicos Islands, Curaçao, Macau, China, Faroe Islands, Gibraltar, (French Polynesia) Tahiti, New Caledonia	Northern Mariana Islands, Sint Maarten, (Collectivity of Saint Martin) Saint-Martin, Guadeloupe, Martinique, French Guiana, Bonaire, (Réunion) Reunion (club competitions only), Zanzibar (club and CECAFA competitions only))	England Scotland Wales Northern Ireland
World Aquatics	Swimming	Anguilla, Curaçao, Sint Maarten, Macau, China, Faroe Islands, Gibraltar, Northern Mariana Islands		As Great Britain
World Athletics	Athletics	(French Polynesia) Tahiti, Norfolk Island, Gibraltar, Macau, China, Anguilla, Montserrat, Turks and Caicos Islands,	New Caledonia, Wallis and Futuna, Niue, Martinique, Guadeloupe, French Guiana, Sint Maarten, Curaçao	As Great Britain
World Archery Federation	Archery	(French Polynesia) Tahiti, Norfolk Island, Falkland Islands, Macau, China, Faroe Islands		As Great Britain
Badminton World Federation	Badminton	Curaçao, (French Polynesia) Tahiti, Gibraltar, Greenland, Falkland Islands, Macau, China, Faroe Islands, Saint Helena, Norfolk Island, Isle of Man, (Réunion) Reunion, French Guiana, Guadeloupe, Martinique, New Caledonia, Martinique, Northern Mariana Islands, Wallis and Futuna		England, Scotland, Wales
FIBA	Basketball	Montserrat, Turks and Caicos Islands, (French Polynesia) Tahiti, Norfolk Island, Macau, China, Gibraltar		As Great Britain
International Boxing Association (amateur)	Amateur boxing	Anguilla, (French Polynesia) Tahiti, Sint Maarten, Curaçao, Macau, China, Gibraltar		England, Scotland, Wales
International Canoe Federation	Canoeing	Sint Maarten, (French Polynesia) Tahiti, Macau, China		As Great Britain
International Cycling Union	Cycling	Sint Maarten, Curaçao, Macau, China (Vatican City) Vatican		As Great Britain
World DanceSport Federation	DanceSport	Macau, China		England, Scotland, Wales
International Federation for Equestrian Sports	Equestrian			England, Scotland, Wales
International Federation of Sport Climbing	Sport Climbing	Macau, China	New Caledonia	As Great Britain
International Fencing Federation	Fencing	Macau, China		As Great Britain
International Golf Federation	Golf			England, Scotland, Wales
International Gymnastics Federation	Gymnastics			England, Scotland, Wales
International Handball Federation	Handball	Faroe Islands, Greenland, French Guiana, (French Polynesia) Tahiti, New Caledonia, Northern Mariana Islands, Guadeloupe, Martinique, Macau, China		As Great Britain, but England and Scotland are association members
International Hockey Federation	Field hockey	Macau, China, Gibraltar		England, Scotland, Wales; but Great Britain is adherent member
International Judo Federation	Judo	Macau, China, Niue, Norfolk Island, New Caledonia, (French Polynesia) Tahiti, Martinique, Guadeloupe, (Réunion) Reunion, Faroe Islands, Curaçao		As Great Britain
International Modern Pentathlon Union	Modern pentathlon			As Great Britain
World Rowing Federation	Rowing	Gibraltar		As Great Britain
World Rugby	Rugby union	Niue	New Caledonia, (French Polynesia) Tahiti, Wallis and Futuna, Macau, China, Martinique, Guadeloupe, French Guiana, Curaçao, (Réunion) Reunion, Mayotte	England, Scotland, Wales
World Sailing	Sailing	(French Polynesia) Tahiti, Netherlands Antilles		As Great Britain
International Shooting Sport Federation	Shooting sports	Faroe Islands, Macau, China		As Great Britain
International Surfing Association	Surfing	Hawaii, (French Polynesia) Tahiti, (Jersey) Channel Islands		England, Scotland, Wales
ITTF	Table tennis	Jersey, Guernsey, Gibraltar, Greenland, Faroe Islands, Macau, China, (French Polynesia) Tahiti, Falkland Islands, Sint Maarten, Northern Mariana Islands, New Caledonia, Niue, Tokelau, Wallis and Futuna		England, Scotland, Wales
World Taekwondo	Taekwondo	Isle of Man, Macau, China, New Caledonia, (French Polynesia) Tahiti, Martinique, Guadeloupe, (Vatican City) Vatican		As Great Britain
ITF	Tennis	(French Polynesia) Tahiti, Curaçao, Macau, China, Anguilla, Bonaire, (Norfolk Island) Norfolk Islands, Northern Mariana Islands	Sint Maarten, Martinique, Guadeloupe, French Guiana	As Great Britain
World Triathlon	Triathlon	Gibraltar, Macau, China, New Caledonia, (French Polynesia) Tahiti, Northern Mariana Islands		As Great Britain
Fédération Internationale de Volleyball	Volleyball	Macau, China, Gibraltar, Greenland, Faroe Islands, (French Polynesia) Tahiti, Northern Mariana Islands, Martinique, Guadeloupe, French Guiana, Bonaire, (Saba (island)) Saba, Sint Eustatius, Sint Maarten, (Collectivity of Saint Martin) Saint-Martin, Curaçao		England, Scotland, Wales
International Weightlifting Federation	Olympic weightlifting	Zanzibar, Niue, New Caledonia, (French Polynesia) Tahiti, Wallis and Futuna, Northern Mariana Islands, Turks and Caicos Islands, Curaçao		(United Kingdom) Great Britain, Northern Ireland, Scotland, Wales
United World Wrestling	Amateur wrestling	Tokelau, Niue, (French Polynesia) Tahiti, Northern Mariana Islands, Turks and Caicos Islands, Curaçao		As Great Britain
International Bobsleigh and Skeleton Federation	Bobsleigh and Skeleton			As Great Britain
International Biathlon Union	Biathlon	Greenland		As Great Britain

=== Association of IOC Recognized International Sports Federations ===
Name of organization	Sport	Non-IOC member is member in world level	Non-IOC member is only member in continental level	Case of Great Britain
World Pool-Billiard Association	Pool (cue sports)	(Northern Cyprus) North Cyprus, Bonaire, Curaçao, (French Polynesia) Tahiti, Macau, China		As Great Britain
International Billiards and Snooker Federation	Snooker and English billiards (amateur)	Isle of Man		None
Union Mondiale de Billard	Carom billiards	(Northern Cyprus) North Cyprus, Isle of Man, Curaçao		None
Tug of War International Federation	Tug of War	(Guernsey) Channel Islands, (Basque Country (autonomous community)) Basque Country, Macau, China		England, Scotland, Wales, Northern Ireland
International Wushu Federation	Wushu	New Caledonia, Macau, China		As Great Britain
Confédération Mondiale des Activités Subaquatiques	Underwater sport	(French Polynesia) Tahiti, Northern Mariana Islands		As Great Britain
World Squash Federation	Squash	Guernsey, Jersey, Isle of Man, Gibraltar, Macau, China, New Caledonia, (French Polynesia) Tahiti, Norfolk Island		England, Scotland, Wales
Union Internationale Motonautique	Powerboating	Macau, China		As Great Britain
Federation of International Polo	Polo			England
International Orienteering Federation	Orienteering	Macau, China		As Great Britain
International Life Saving Federation	Lifesaving	Macau, China, Faroe Islands		As Great Britain
World Skate	Roller sports	Macau, China		As Great Britain
International Federation of Muaythai Associations	Muay Thai	Macau, China, (French Polynesia) Tahiti		As Great Britain
World Lacrosse	Lacrosse	Catalonia, Curaçao, Haudenosaunee, Macau, China,		England, Scotland, Wales
International Floorball Federation	Floorball	Macau, China		As Great Britain
World Flying Disc Federation	Flying Disc	Macau, China		As Great Britain
International Bowling Federation	Bowling	Catalonia, Macau, China, Jersey, Gibraltar, Northern Mariana Islands, Curaçao		(United Kingdom) Great Britain, Scotland, Wales, Northern Ireland
World Karate Federation	Karate	Macau, China, Martinique, New Caledonia, (French Polynesia) Tahiti, Wallis and Futuna, Curaçao		Great Britain is full member, but Home Nations participate separately as England, Scotland, Wales, Northern Ireland
World Bridge Federation	Contract bridge	Faroe Islands, Macau, China, (Réunion) Reunion, Martinique, Guadeloupe		England, Scotland, Wales
International Federation Icestocksport	ice stock sport			As Great Britain
International Waterski & Wakeboard Federation	(3-Event Waterskiing), Wakeboard, Barefoot, Show Skiing, Cable Wakeboard, Cableski, Ski Racing, and Disabled Skiing			As Great Britain
World Association of Kickboxing Organizations	Kickboxing	Macau, China		As Great Britain
Fédération Internationale de Motocyclisme	Motorcycle racing	Macau, China		As Great Britain
FIDE	Chess	Faroe Islands, Macau, China, (Curaçao) Netherlands Antilles, Guernsey, Jersey, Isle of Man		England, Scotland, Wales
International Racquetball Federation	Racquetball	Catalonia, (Northern Mariana Islands) Saipan		England
Fédération Internationale de Sambo	Sambo			As Great Britain
International Ski Mountaineering Federation	Ski Mountaineering			As Great Britain
International Climbing and Mountaineering Federation	Climbing and Mountaineering			As Great Britain
International Sumo Federation	Sumo			As Great Britain
International Cricket Council	Cricket	West Indies, Ireland, Isle of Man, Jersey, Guernsey, Gibraltar, Saint Helena, Faroe Islands, Turks and Caicos Islands, Falkland Islands	Nevis, Anguilla, Montserrat, Sint Maarten	England, Scotland

== See also ==
- Refugee Olympic Team at the Olympics
- Independent Olympians at the Olympic Games
- National Paralympic Committee
- List of IOC country codes
- District of Columbia Olympic Committee
- Commonwealth Games Association
