= Flag of the Federated States of Micronesia =

Federated States of Micronesia
- Flag of the Federated States of Micronesia
- Use: Civil and state flag, civil and state ensign
- Proportion: 10:19
- Adopted: 30 November 1978; 47 years ago
- Design: A light blue field with four white five-pointed stars arranged in the diamond pattern in the center.
- Use: Civil and state flag, civil and state ensign
- Proportion: 10:19
- Design: A blue field with four white five-pointed stars arranged in the diamond pattern in the center.

The flag of the Federated States of Micronesia was adopted on 30 November 1978. The blue field represents the Pacific Ocean. In an echo of U.S. heraldic practice, the stars represent the four federated states: Chuuk, Pohnpei, Kosrae and Yap, arranged like the points of the compass. It is based on the flag of the Trust Territory of the Pacific Islands.

== History ==
Flag of the Trust Territory of the Pacific Islands, which inspired the modern Micronesian flag

At the start of the First World War, Japan occupied Micronesia, and in 1920, the newly formed League of Nations entrusted the islands to Japan. This was the beginning of the South Seas Mandate. This lasted until the American occupation, which began in 1944, but wasn't officially revoked until 1947. The United Nations then created the Trust Territory of the Pacific Islands (TTIP), which were transferred to the trusteeship of the United States. In the 1950s, the residents had protested the adoption of a flag, citing the lack of a cohesive identity for the disparate group of islands, and the scheme to create one was dropped.

The trust territory first adopted a flag on 24 October 1962, which featured a design of six white stars around a shade of blue based on the flag of the United Nations. The flag was designed by Gonzalo Santos and officially approved in 1965 by the National Congress. The six stars represented the districts of Yap, Truk, Pohnpei, Palau, Marshall Islands, and Northern Mariana Islands; the latter three did not become part of the eventual Federated States of Micronesia (FSM) in 1979.

A four-star variation of the former trust territory flag was adopted on 30 November 1978 prior to independence; Kosrae was split from Pohnpei and is represented by the fourth star. The blue shade based on the United Nations flag was substituted for a darker blue after the FSM ascended to the Compact of Free Association with the United States on 3 November 1986.

== Design ==
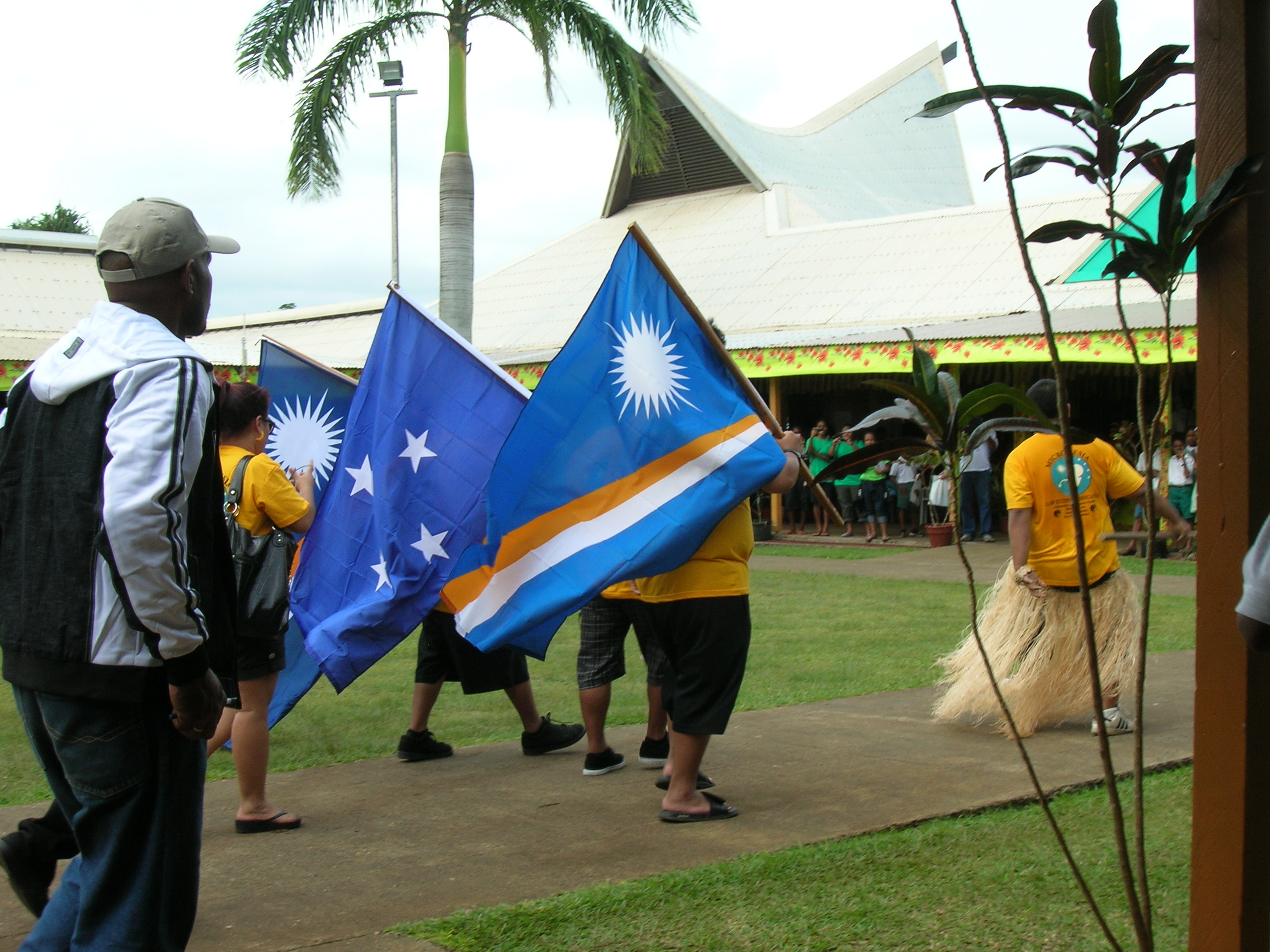
Students in Port Vila, Vanuatu, with Marshall Islands and Micronesia flags.

The four white stars are oriented in a circle with none of the "rays" pointing inwards, adorning a shade of blue representing the Pacific Ocean. The ratio of the flag is 10:19 and the width of each star to the flag is 1:5, though it is permissible to reproduce the flag in other dimensions for unofficial purposes.

=== Colours ===
The colours on the Micronesian flag are:

Scheme	Blue	White
Pantone (Paper)	277 C	White
Web colours	#ABCAE9	#FFFFFF
RGB	171, 202, 233	255, 255, 255
CMYK	27%, 13%, 0%, 9%	0%, 0%, 0%, 0%

== Regulation and use ==
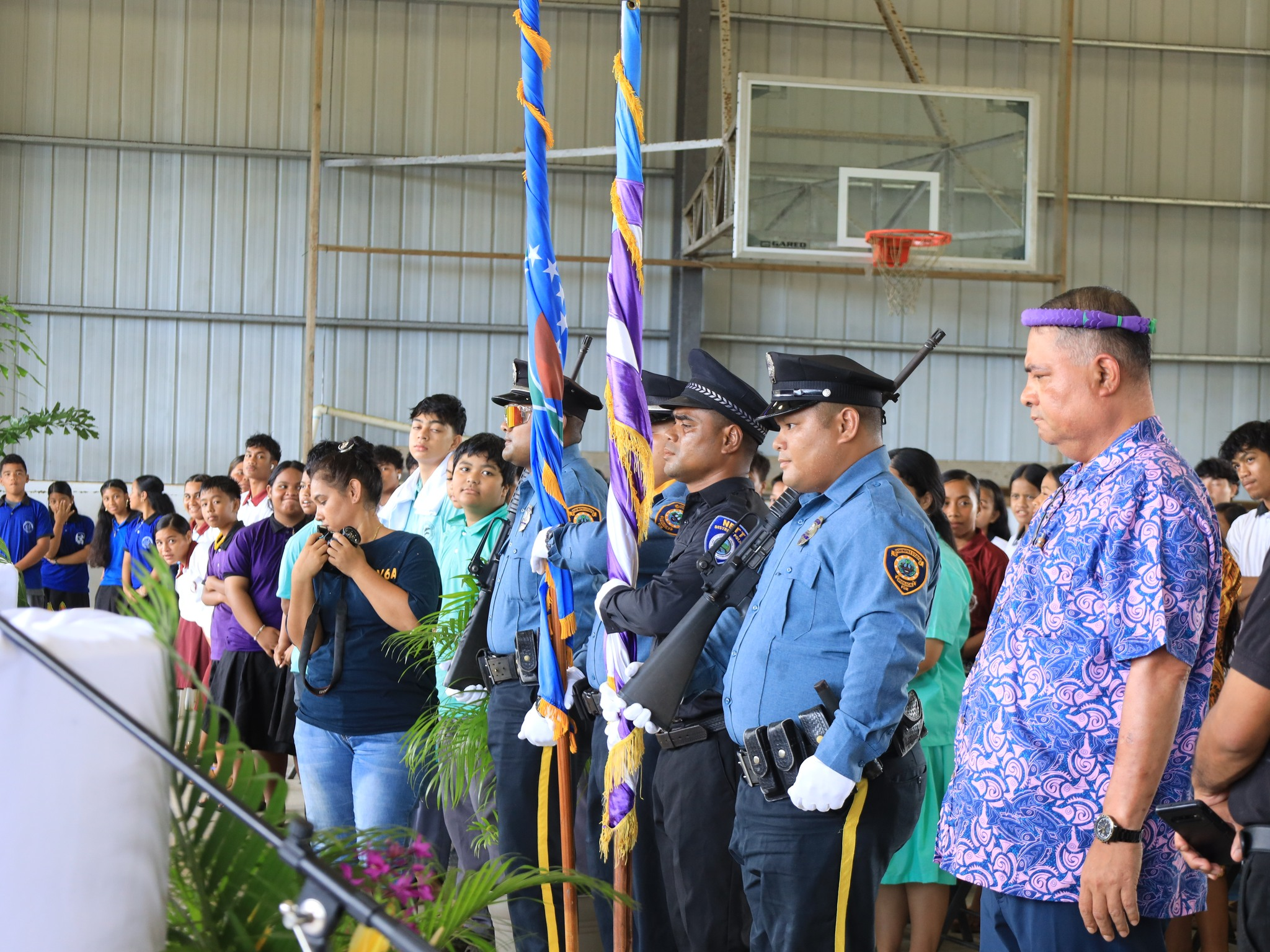
The flags of Pohnpei State and the municipality of Nett

The flag code establishes that the flag shall be flown, in the open air, from sunrise to sunset, only on buildings, boats which are registered in the Federated States of Micronesia, staffs or halyards. It shall be raised promptly, but lowered ceremoniously. On national territory, except in the case of embassies, consulates, diplomatic missions and offices of international agencies, it shall not be in a lower position than any other flag. When the national anthem is playing and the flag of the Federated States of Micronesia is displayed, all persons present shall stand and face the flag. The President may establish rules and procedures for the presentation of the flag at half-mast and its use at official funerals.

Willful desecration in public is punishable by a fine of no more than $100 or imprisonment for no more than six months, or both. The captain of a vessel registered in the Federated States of Micronesia who fails to display the national flag or displays another flag in such a manner as to imply another nationality is liable to a fine not exceeding $50,000. Knowingly displaying the flag of the Federated States of Micronesia on board a vessel in such a manner as to falsely appear to be a vessel registered in the country is punishable by a fine not exceeding $100,000 or imprisonment for not more than one year, or both. The vessel may also be forfeited to the national government.

Subnational flags are permitted. Each of the four states of the Federated States of Micronesia and many municipalities have one. They are always to be positioned in a logical inferiority to the national flag.

=== Practical use ===
Little information is available on how the flag is perceived by the population. A 2003 study on the perception of flags highlighted that, although clan, municipal, state or national flags are flown during sports competitions or contests as a sign of recognition and belonging, and religious flags are used during processions and ceremonies of the Protestant church, the Micronesian population attaches little importance to flags and the rituals that surround them as an element of cultural cohesion. Obtaining a flag is difficult.

== Historical flags ==
Flag of the Trust Territory of the Pacific Islands; was used in the FSM 1965 to 1978.

Flag of Pohnpei from 1977 to 1992

== State flags ==
Chuuk

Kosrae

Pohnpei

Yap

== See also ==
- List of Micronesian flags
