= Papua New Guinea at the 2023 Pacific Games =

- IOC code: PNG
- National federation: Papua New Guinea Olympic Committee

19 November 2023 – 2 December 2023
- Competitors: 310 (164 men and 146 women) in 14 sports
- Flag bearers: Ramona Padio; Matthew Stubbings
- Officials: Faye-Zina Lalo (chef de mission)
- Medals Ranked 5th: Gold 29 Silver 37 Bronze 39 Total 105

Pacific Games appearances
- 1963; 1966; 1969; 1971; 1975; 1979; 1983; 1987; 1991; 1995; 1999; 2003; 2007; 2011; 2015; 2019; 2023

Papua New Guinea competed at the 2023 Pacific Games in Honiara, Solomon Islands from 19 November to 2 December 2023. Papua New Guinean athletes have appeared in every edition of the Pacific Games since the inaugural games in 1963.

On 11 October 2023, the Papua New Guinea Olympic Committee confirmed 20 sports for participation at the games. Papua New Guinea women's national football team captain, Ramona Padio, and Tennis number one Matthew Stubbings were named flag bearers for the opening ceremony on 10 November 2023.

== Administration ==
In September, 2022, the Papua New Guinea Pacific Games Association (PNGPGA) appointed Faye-Zina Lalo as Chef de Mission.

== Competitors ==
The following is the list of number of competitors confirmed for the Games.

| Sport | Men | Women | Total |
|---|---|---|---|
| Athletics | 32 | 14 | 46 |
| Basketball | 16 | 16 | 32 |
| Bodybuilding | 7 | 0 | 7 |
| Boxing | 12 | 8 | 20 |
| Field hockey | 9 | 9 | 18 |
| Football | 23 | 23 | 46 |
| Golf | 4 | 4 | 8 |
| Netball | —N/a | 12 | 12 |
| Rugby sevens | 12 | 12 | 24 |
| Swimming | 5 | 6 | 11 |
| Tennis | 4 | 4 | 8 |
| Touch rugby | 14 | 14 | 28 |
| Volleyball | 16 | 16 | 32 |
| Weightlifting | 10 | 8 | 18 |
| Total | 164 | 146 | 310 |

== Athletics ==
Athletics Papua New Guinea announced a team of 35 athletes in track and field on 11 September 2023. The PNG team will feature three defending champions from Apia 2019, namely long-distance runner Simbai Kaspar (men's 3000 m steeplechase), long jumper Rellie Kaputin, and javelin thrower Sharon Toako. Eleven para-athletes were made known on 6 November 2023 after Oceania Athletics published the preliminary entry-list for the Games.

Key

- Note–Ranks given for track events are within the athlete's heat only
- Q = Qualified for the next round
- q = Qualified for the next round as a fastest loser or, in field events, by position without achieving the qualifying target
- qR = Qualified to the next round by referee judgement
- NR = National record
- N/A = Round not applicable for the event
- Bye = Athlete not required to compete in round

=== Track and road events ===
Men

| Athlete | Event | Heat | | Semifinal | | Final | |
| Athlete | Event | Result | Rank | Result | Rank | Result | Rank |
|---|---|---|---|---|---|---|---|
| Emmanuel Anis | 100 m | 10.76 | 2 Q | 10.99 | 4 | Did not advance | |
| Leroy Kamau | 100 m | 10.51 | 1 Q | 10.73 | 1 Q | DSQ | |
| Pais Wisil | 100 m | 10.60 | 1 Q | 10.63 | 1 Q | 10.76 | 4 |
| Daniel Baul | 200 m | 21.62 | 2 Q | 21.82 | 2 Q | 21.36 | 3rd place, bronze medalist(s) |
| Leroy Kamau | 200 m | 21.61 | 1 Q | 22.15 | 4 q | 21.24 | 2nd place, silver medalist(s) |
| Pais Wisil | 200 m | 21.94 | 1 Q | 22.37 | 1 Q | 21.92 | 6 |
| Benjamin Aliel | 400 m | 48.23 | 1 Q | —N/a | | 47.17 | 1st place, gold medalist(s) |
| Daniel Baul | 400 m | 48.44 | 1 Q | —N/a | | 47.21 | 2nd place, silver medalist(s) |
| Emmanuel Wanga | 400 m | 49.34 | 2 Q | —N/a | | 48.43 | 3rd place, bronze medalist(s) |
| Adolf Kauba | 800 m | 1:53.89 | 4 q | —N/a | | 1:54.99 | 5 |
| Jiuteis Robinson | 800 m | DSQ | | —N/a | | Did not advance | |
| Lot Samare | 800 m | 1:56.50 | 5 q | —N/a | | 2:00.60 | 8 |
| Juteis Robinson | 1500 m | —N/a | | | | 4:06.44 | 6 |
| Israel Takap | 1500 m | —N/a | | | | 4:18.86 | 10 |
| Aquila Turalom | 1500 m | —N/a | | | | 3:59.02 | 5 |
| Wilford Baia | 5000 m | —N/a | | | | 16:34.26 | 9 |
| Dilu Goiye | 5000 m | —N/a | | | | 16:05.52 | 7 |
| Siune Kagl | 5000 m | —N/a | | | | 15:30.02 | 3rd place, bronze medalist(s) |
| Dilu Goiye | 10000 m | —N/a | | | | 33:57.08 | 3rd place, bronze medalist(s) |
| James Kuadua | 10000 m | —N/a | | | | 34:38.13 | 4 |
| Siune Kagl | 10000 m | —N/a | | | | 35:00.87 | 8 |
| Robert Oa | 110 m hurdles | 15.18 | 3 Q | —N/a | | 14.81 | 3rd place, bronze medalist(s) |
| Daniel Baul | 400 m hurdles | 53.23 | 1 Q | —N/a | | 52.75 | 1st place, gold medalist(s) |
| Sialis Passinghan | 400 m hurdles | 55.23 | 1 Q | —N/a | | 54.37 | 3rd place, bronze medalist(s) |
| William Peka | 400 m hurdles | 55.58 | 2 Q | —N/a | | 52.86 | 2nd place, silver medalist(s) |
| Abel Siune | 3000 m steeplechase | —N/a | | | | 10:03.13 | 5 |
| Israel Takap | 3000 m steeplechase | —N/a | | | | 10:13.89 | 6 |
| Aquila Turalom | 3000 m steeplechase | —N/a | | | | 9:26.10 | 2nd place, silver medalist(s) |
| Emmanuel Anis; Daniel Baul; Pais Wisil; Leroy Kamau; Emmanuel Wanga^{[a]} | 4 × 100 m relay | 41.31 | 2 Q | —N/a | | 40.59 | 1st place, gold medalist(s) |
| Daniel Baul; Emmanuel Wanga; Leroy Kamau; Benjamin Aliel | 4 × 400 m relay | —N/a | | | | 3:13.53 | 1st place, gold medalist(s) |
| James Gundu | Half marathon | —N/a | | | | 1:16:42.00 | 8 |
| Siune Kagl | Half marathon | —N/a | | | | 1:11:34.00 | 2nd place, silver medalist(s) |
| Wilford Baia | Half marathon | —N/a | | | | 1:21:21.00 | 12 |

Women

| Athlete | Event | Heat | | Semifinal | | Final | |
| Athlete | Event | Result | Rank | Result | Rank | Result | Rank |
|---|---|---|---|---|---|---|---|
| Isila Apkup | 100 m | 12.00 | 1 Q | 12.06 | 2 Q | 11.86 | 2nd place, silver medalist(s) |
| Isila Apkup | 200 m | 24.87 | 2 Q | —N/a | | 24.43 | 4 |
| Isila Apkup | 400 m | 60.45 | 3 Q | —N/a | | 57.14 | 4 |
| Leonie Beu | 100 m | 12.19 | 2 Q | 12.15 | 3 Q | 12.17 | 5 |
| Leonie Beu | 200 m | 24.78 | 1 Q | —N/a | | 24.22 | 2nd place, silver medalist(s) |
| Leonie Beu | 400 m | 57.40 | 2 Q | —N/a | | 56.42 | 3rd place, bronze medalist(s) |
| Adrine Monagi | 100 m | 12.00 | 1 Q | 12.17 | 2 Q | 12.10 | 4 |
| Adrine Monagi | 100 m hurdles | 14.13 | 1 Q | —N/a | | 14.29 | 2nd place, silver medalist(s) |
| Salome Yaling | 200 m | 27.42 | 6 | —N/a | | Did not advance | |
| Scholastica Herman | 1500 m | —N/a | | | | 4:44.79 | 4 |
| Scholastica Herman | 5000 m | —N/a | | | | 18:38.93 | 2nd place, silver medalist(s) |
| Scholastica Herman | 10,000 m | —N/a | | | | DNF | – |
| Mary Kua | 800 m | —N/a | | | | 2:30.18 | 7 |
| Mary Kua | 1500 m | —N/a | | | | 5:16.95 | 9 |
| Mary Kua | 3000 m steeplechase | —N/a | | | | DNF | – |
| Christina Moiyang | 5000 m | —N/a | | | | 20:27.76 | 11 |
| Christina Moiyang | 10,000 m | —N/a | | | | 48:46.48 | 7 |
| Mary Tenge | 5000 m | —N/a | | | | 19:43.31 | 7 |
| Mary Tenge | 10,000 m | —N/a | | | | DNF | – |
| Mary Tenge | 3000 m steeplechase | —N/a | | | | 12:11.04 | 3rd place, bronze medalist(s) |
| Adrine Monagi; Isila Apkup; Edna Boafob; Leonie Beu | 4 × 100 m relay | 46.49 | 1 Q | —N/a | | 46.10 | 1st place, gold medalist(s) |
| Isila Apkup; Edna Boafob; Adrine Monagi; Leonie Beu | 4 × 400 m relay | —N/a | | | | 3:49.11 | 1st place, gold medalist(s) |
| Scholastica Herman | Half marathon | —N/a | | | | 1:32:30.00 | 7 |
| Mary Tenge | Half marathon | —N/a | | | | 1:43:00.00 | 10 |

=== Field events ===
Men

| Athlete | Event | Final | |
| Athlete | Event | Distance | Position |
|---|---|---|---|
| Eldan Toti | Long jump | 5.80 m | 12 |
| Eldan Toti | High jump | DNS | |
| Karo Iga | Long jump | 6.49 m | 8 |
| Karo Iga | Pole vault | NM | — |
| Robert Oa | Triple jump | 14.22 m | 5 |
| Lakona Gerega | Javelin throw | 61.67 m | 6 |
| Kenny Moalley | Javelin throw | 62.62 m | 5 |

Women

| Athlete | Event | Final | |
| Athlete | Event | Distance | Position |
|---|---|---|---|
| Edna Boafob | High jump | 1.45 m | =6 |
| Rellie Kaputin | Long jump | 5.89 m | 3rd place, bronze medalist(s) |
| Rellie Kaputin | Triple jump | 11.90 m | 3rd place, bronze medalist(s) |
| Rellie Kaputin | High jump | 1.60 m | 2nd place, silver medalist(s) |
| Sharon Toako | Discus throw | 37.82 m | 7 |
| Sharon Toako | Javelin throw | 45.49 m | 1st place, gold medalist(s) |
| Sharon Toako | Hammer throw | 36.22 m | 9 |

=== Combined events ===
Men's decathlon

| Athlete | Event | 100 m | LJ | SP | HJ | 400 m | 110H | DT | PV | JT | 1500 m | Final | Rank |
|---|---|---|---|---|---|---|---|---|---|---|---|---|---|
| Karo Iga | Result | 10.93 | 6.83 m | 10.78 m | 1.94 m | 49.72 | 16.13 | 30.20 m | 4.00 m | 52.84 m | 4:58.71 | 7479 pts | 1st place, gold medalist(s) |
| Karo Iga | Points | 876 | 774 | 533 | 749 | 828 | 718 | 468 | 617 | 631 | 567 | 7479 pts | 1st place, gold medalist(s) |

Women's heptathlon

| Athlete | Event | 100H | HJ | SP | 200 m | LJ | JT | 800 m | Final | Rank |
|---|---|---|---|---|---|---|---|---|---|---|
| Edna Boafob | Result | 15.53 | 1.47 m | 12.18 m | 25.24 | 5.05 m | 32.76 m | 2:37.21 | 4606 pts | 2nd place, silver medalist(s) |
| Edna Boafob | Points | 773 | 588 | 673 | 865 | 573 | 529 | 605 | 4606 pts | 2nd place, silver medalist(s) |

=== Para-athletics ===
Men

| Athlete | Event | Heat | | Final | |
| Athlete | Event | Result | Rank | Result | Rank |
|---|---|---|---|---|---|
| Steven Abraham (T46) | 100 m ambulant | 11.81 | 1 q | 11.63 | 2nd place, silver medalist(s) |
| Judah Gomoga (T/F37) | 100 m ambulant | 13.20 | 4 q | 13.47 | 8 |
| Joel Weibiong (T/F46) | 100 m ambulant | 12.31 | 2 q | 12.23 | 4 |
| Junior Dennis (T47/F46) | Shot put ambulant | —N/a | | 9.35 m | 12 |
| Junior Dennis (T47/F46) | Javelin throw ambulant | —N/a | | 44.25 m | 5 |
| Netty Kave (F44) | Shot put ambulant | —N/a | | 9.61 m | 7 |
| Netty Kave (F44) | Javelin throw ambulant | —N/a | | 38.84 m | 8 |
| Archie Raiwong (F37) | Shot put ambulant | —N/a | | 9.22 m | 13 |
| Archie Raiwong (F37) | Javelin throw ambulant | —N/a | | 18.95 m | 12 |
| Jerome Bunge | Shot put secured throw | —N/a | | 8.97 m | 5 |
| Morea Mararos | Shot put secured throw | —N/a | | 7.70 m | 3rd place, bronze medalist(s) |

Women

| Athlete | Event | Heat | | Final | |
| Athlete | Event | Result | Rank | Result | Rank |
|---|---|---|---|---|---|
| Manega Tapari (T47/F46) | 100 m ambulant | —N/a | | 15.05 | 4 |
| Manega Tapari (T47/F46) | Shot put ambulant | —N/a | | 8.14 m | 6 |
| Manega Tapari (T47/F46) | Javelin throw ambulant | —N/a | | 25.24 m | 6 |
| Regina Edward | Shot put ambulant | —N/a | | 8.48 m | 4 |
| Regina Edward | Javelin throw ambulant | —N/a | | 26.56 m | 4 |

^{a} Athletes who participated in the heats only.

== Basketball ==
=== 5×5 basketball ===
Summary

| Team | Event | Preliminary round | | | | Qualifying finals | Semifinals | Final / GM | |
| Team | Event | Opposition Score | Opposition Score | Opposition Score | Rank | Opposition Score | Opposition Score | Opposition Score | Rank |
|---|---|---|---|---|---|---|---|---|---|
| Papua New Guinea Men's | Men's | Solomon Islands; W 81–34 | Guam; L 77–96 | Samoa; W 87–72 | 2 | New Caledonia; L 78–87 | Did not advance | | |
| Papua New Guinea Women's | Women's | Tahiti; L 38–84 | Cook Islands; L 37–59 | Tonga; L 46–67 | 4 | did not advance | | | |

==== Men's tournament ====
Papua New Guinea men's national basketball team qualified for the Pacific Games by securing one of two berths after being runners-up at the 2022 FIBA Melanesia Basketball Cup in Suva.

Team roster

- Apia Muri
- Augustine Kaupa
- Conillus Muri
- Purari Muri
- Michael Henry
- Moses Kairi
- Harold Elavo
- Morea Elavo
- Eddie Moses
- Anderson Hewe
- Ryan Tetemo
- Christian Pang

==== Women's tournament ====
Papua New Guinea women's national basketball team qualified for the Pacific Games by securing one of two berths after being runners-up at the 2022 FIBA Women's Melanesia Basketball Cup in Suva.

Team roster

- Rosa Kairi
- Marca Muri
- Jonita Warabe
- Normalisa Dobunaba
- Betinah Dobunaba
- Mary Elavo
- Jackie Asiba
- Shera Yawasing
- Osma Legas
- Clarice Hane
- Magrette Jevin
- Jennifer Haro

=== 3×3 basketball ===
Summary

| Team | Event | Pool play | | | | | | Semifinals | Final / GM | |
| Team | Event | Opposition Score | Opposition Score | Opposition Score | Opposition Score | Opposition Score | Rank | Opposition Score | Opposition Score | Rank |
|---|---|---|---|---|---|---|---|---|---|---|
| Papua New Guinea men's | Men's tournament | American Samoa; W 13–10 | Samoa; W 21–9 | New Caledonia; L 11–21 | Marshall Islands; W 17–16 | Solomon Islands – | | | | |
| Papua New Guinea women's | Women's tournament | Guam; W 18–14 | French Polynesia; L 9–21 | Tonga; L 12–13 | New Caledonia – | —N/a | | | | |

==== Men's tournament ====
Team roster

- Jabez Geita
- Tony Haro
- Sibona Kala
- Moses Lune

==== Women's tournament ====
Team roster

- Betty Angula
- Hannah Kuwimb
- Ronnie Pomat
- Nester Sape

== Bodybuilding ==
The Papua New Guinea Bodybuilding Federation announced a team of seven athletes on 9 November 2023.

- Iso Finch –65 kg
- Rexford Viyufa –70 kg
- Steve Bomal –75 kg
- Dominic Yuanis –80 kg
- Elvis Gero –90 kg
- Rex Tonga –95 kg
- Douglas Yurasi

== Boxing ==
The Papua New Guinea Boxing Union announced an initial 20-member squad (12 men and 8 women) on 12 October 2023.

| Athlete | Event | Round of 32 | Round of 16 | Quarterfinals | Semifinals | Final | |
| Athlete | Event | Opposition Result | Opposition Result | Opposition Result | Opposition Result | Opposition Result | Rank |
|---|---|---|---|---|---|---|---|
| | | – | – | – | – | – | |
| | | – | – | – | – | – | |
| | | – | – | – | – | – | |
| | | – | – | – | – | – | |
| | | – | – | – | – | – | |
| | | – | – | – | – | – | |
| | | – | – | – | – | – | |
| | | – | – | – | – | – | |
| | | – | – | – | – | – | |
| | | – | – | – | – | – | |
| | | – | – | – | – | – | |
| | | – | – | – | – | – | |
| | | – | – | – | – | – | |
| | | – | – | – | – | – | |
| | | – | – | – | – | – | |
| | | – | – | – | – | – | |
| | | – | – | – | – | – | |
| | | – | – | – | – | – | |
| | | – | – | – | – | – | |
| | | – | – | – | – | – | |

== Field hockey ==
Summary

Key:

- FT = After full time
- P = Match decided by penalty-shootout

| Team | Event | Round-robin | | | | | | Semifinal | Final | |
| Team | Event | Opposition Score | Opposition Score | Opposition Score | Opposition Score | Opposition Score | Rank | Opposition Score | Opposition Score | Rank |
|---|---|---|---|---|---|---|---|---|---|---|
| Papua New Guinea men's | Men's tournament | Vanuatu; W 6–1 | Solomon Islands; W 2–1 | Tonga; L 2–3 | Samoa; W 4–2 | Fiji; L 3–5 | 2 | Solomon Islands | | |
| Papua New Guinea women's | Women's tournament | Vanuatu; D 2–2 | Solomon Islands; L 0–2 | Samoa; L 0–1 | Fiji; L 0–2 | Tonga; W 3–1 | 4 | Fiji | | |

=== Men's tournament ===
The Papua New Guinea Hockey Federation selected a 9-member roster for the Games.

Team roster

- Jersey Dusty
- Lionel Hebei
- Chanan Herman
- Martin Kanamon
- Terence Pomaleu
- Henry Pomoso
- Trent Pomoso
- Ignatius Pou
- Andrew Raoma

=== Women's tournament ===
The Papua New Guinea Hockey Federation selected a 9-member roster for the Games.

Team roster

- Danielle Bon
- Georgina Bon
- Ruby Kisapai
- Vanessa Perry
- Tricia Pomaleu
- Rachael Rabbie
- Sullyanne Sissi
- Nikita Terence
- Monica Wadi

== Football ==
Summary

| Team | Event | Preliminary round | | | | Semifinal | Final | |
| Team | Event | Opposition Score | Opposition Score | Opposition Score | Rank | Opposition Score | Opposition Score | Rank |
|---|---|---|---|---|---|---|---|---|
| Papua New Guinea men's | Men's | Tuvalu; W w/o | Vanuatu; D 1–1 | —N/a | 2 | Did not advance | | |
| Papua New Guinea women's | Women's | American Samoa; W 9–0 | Cook Islands; W 3–0 | New Caledonia; D 2–2 | 1 | Samoa; W 5–1 | Fiji; W 4–1 | 1st place, gold medalist(s) |

=== Men's tournament ===
Team roster

Head coach: (Australia) Warren Moon

Moon named his 23-man squad on 13 November 2023.

| No. | Pos. | Player | Date of birth (age) | Caps | Goals | Club |
|---|---|---|---|---|---|---|
| | GK | Dave Tomare | 26 April 1997 (aged 26) | 0 | 0 | (Papua New Guinea Football Association) Hekari United |
| | GK | Ronald Warisan | 20 September 1989 (aged 34) | 22 | 0 | (Papua New Guinea Football Association) Lae City |
| | GK | Vagi Koniel | 26 October 1996 (aged 27) | 0 | 0 | (Papua New Guinea Football Association) Lae City |
| | DF | Abel Redenut | 17 April 1995 (aged 28) | 0 | 0 | (Papua New Guinea Football Association) Hekari United |
| | DF | Daniel Joe | 29 May 1990 (aged 33) | 21 | 0 | (Papua New Guinea Football Association) Hekari United |
| | DF | Godfrey Haro | 30 June 1998 (aged 25) | 0 | 0 | (Papua New Guinea Football Association) Southern Strikers |
| | DF | Thomas Yagum | 21 May 1995 (aged 28) | 0 | 0 | (Papua New Guinea Football Association) Lae City |
| | DF | Nathaniel Eddie | | 0 | 0 | (Papua New Guinea Football Association) Hekari United |
| | DF | Karo Kila | 27 September 2002 (aged 21) | 0 | 0 | (Papua New Guinea Football Association) Hekari United |
| | DF | Philip Steven | 19 January 1995 (aged 28) | 3 | 0 | (Papua New Guinea Football Association) Port Moresby |
| | MF | Emmanuel Simon | 25 December 1992 (aged 30) | 23 | 4 | (Papua New Guinea Football Association) Lae City |
| | MF | Joseph Joe | 14 June 2002 (aged 21) | 0 | 0 | (Papua New Guinea Football Association) Hekari United |
| | MF | Rex Naime | 23 October 2003 (aged 20) | 0 | 0 | (Papua New Guinea Football Association) Hekari United |
| | MF | Oberth Simon | 1 January 2001 (aged 22) | 0 | 0 | (Papua New Guinea Football Association) Hekari United |
| | MF | Yagi Yasasa | 17 August 2000 (aged 23) | 3 | 0 | (Papua New Guinea Football Association) Hekari United |
| | MF | Nigel Dabinyaba | 26 October 1992 (aged 31) | 19 | 11 | (Papua New Guinea Football Association) Hekari United |
| | MF | Tizoki Tangol | | 0 | 0 | (Papua New Guinea Football Association) |
| | FW | Troy Dobbin | | 0 | 0 | (Papua New Guinea Football Association) Gulf Komara |
| | FW | Ati Kepo | 15 January 1996 (aged 27) | 7 | 3 | (Papua New Guinea Football Association) Hekari United |
| | FW | Tommy Semmy | 30 September 1994 (aged 29) | 14 | 5 | (Football Australia) Dandenong City |
| | FW | Kenneth Arah | 15 January 1996 (aged 27) | 0 | 0 | (Papua New Guinea Football Association) Gulf Komara |
| | FW | Kolu Kepo | 15 July 1993 (aged 30) | 9 | 4 | (Papua New Guinea Football Association) Hekari United |
| | FW | Pascal Kundi | 15 January 1996 (aged 27) | 0 | 0 | (Papua New Guinea Football Association) Port Moresby Strikers |

Group play

| Pos | Team | Pld | W | D | L | GF | GA | GD | Pts | Qualification |
|---|---|---|---|---|---|---|---|---|---|---|
| 1 | Vanuatu | 2 | 1 | 1 | 0 | 7 | 1 | +6 | 4 | Knockout stage |
| 2 | Papua New Guinea | 2 | 1 | 1 | 0 | 4 | 1 | +3 | 4 | |
| 3 | Tuvalu | 2 | 0 | 0 | 2 | 0 | 9 | −9 | 0 | |

Updated to match(es) played on 23 November 2023. Source: SOL23
17 November 2023
12:00

| Papua New Guinea | 3–0 (w/o) | Tuvalu |
|---|---|---|
| | Report |

Lawson Tama Stadium, Honiara

23 November 2023
12:00

| Vanuatu | 1–1 | Papua New Guinea |
|---|---|---|
| Soromon 52' | | Kepo 45+7' |

Lawson Tama Stadium, Honiara

=== Women's tournament ===
Team roster

Head coach: (Papua New Guinea) Frederica Siwin-Sakette

| No. | Pos. | Player | Date of birth (age) | Caps | Goals | Club |
|---|---|---|---|---|---|---|
| 1 | GK | Faith Kasiray | 20 December 1999 (age 26) | 6 | 0 | (Papua New Guinea Football Association) POM |
| | DF | Anashtasia Gunemba | | | | |
| 5 | DF | Olivia Upaupa | 6 June 1992 (age 33) | 30 | 9 | (Papua New Guinea Football Association) Lae |
| | DF | Serah Waida | | | | |
| | DF | Georgina Bakani | | | | |
| | DF | Michaelyne Butubu | | | | |
| 2 | DF | Lavinia Hola | 22 March 1999 (age 27) | 5 | 0 | (Papua New Guinea Football Association) POM |
| 20 | DF | Gloria Laeli | 25 March 1997 (age 29) | 2 | 0 | (Papua New Guinea Football Association) POM |
| 16 | MF | Rumona Morris | 5 June 1993 (age 32) | 2 | 0 | (Papua New Guinea Football Association) POM |
| | MF | Ramona Padio | | | | |
| | MF | Phylis Pala | | | | |
| | FW | Calista Maneo | | | | |
| | FW | Marie Kaipu | | | | |
| | FW | Nenny Elipas | | | | |
| | | Christie Maneu | | | | |
| | | Mavis Singara | | | | |
| | | Merolyne Sali | | | | |
| | | Arnolda Dou | | | | |
| | | Ginnimarie Wambi | | | | |
| | | Glories Miag | | | | |
| | | Mayah Samai | | | | |
| | | Fidorah Namuesh | | | | |
| | | Grace Batiy | | | | |

Group play

| Pos | Team | Pld | W | D | L | GF | GA | GD | Pts | Qualification |
|---|---|---|---|---|---|---|---|---|---|---|
| 1 | Papua New Guinea | 3 | 2 | 1 | 0 | 14 | 2 | +12 | 7 | Knockout stage |
| 2 | New Caledonia | 3 | 2 | 1 | 0 | 11 | 4 | +7 | 7 | Knockout stage |
| 3 | Cook Islands | 3 | 1 | 0 | 2 | 5 | 8 | −3 | 3 | Advance to 5th–8th placement matches |
| 4 | American Samoa | 3 | 0 | 0 | 3 | 0 | 16 | −16 | 0 | Advance to 9th place match |

Updated to match(es) played on 20 November 2023. Source: SOL23
17 November 2023
19:00

| Papua New Guinea | 9–0 | American Samoa |
|---|---|---|
| Padio 7', 34', 49', 53' (pen.), 78', 84'; Elipas 50'; Kaipu 58', 76' | Report |

SIFF Academy fields 1 & 2, Honiara
Referee: Ben Ariel Aukwai (Solomon Islands)

20 November 2023
16:00

| Papua New Guinea | 3–0 | Cook Islands |
|---|---|---|
| Padio 16', 26'; Butubu 81' | Report |

SIFF Academy fields 1 & 2, Honiara
Referee: Norbert Hauata (Tahiti)

23 November 2023
19:00

| New Caledonia | 2–2 | Papua New Guinea |
|---|---|---|
| Wenessia 26'; Hnaune 88' | Report | Ligneul 24' (o.g.); Butubu 50' |

SIFF Academy Fields 1 & 2, Honiara
Referee: Ben Ariel Aukwai (Solomon Islands)

Semifinal

27 November 2023
12:00

| Papua New Guinea | 5–1 | Samoa |
|---|---|---|
| Padio 7', 26', 78'; Kaipu 40', 64' | Report | Lyne-Lewis 56' |

Lawson Tama Stadium, Honiara
Referee: Bernard Mutukera (Solomon Islands)

Gold medal final

1 December 2023
19:00

| Papua New Guinea | 4–1 | Fiji |
|---|---|---|
| Pala 20'; Kaipu 72'; Maneo 80', 90+8' | Report | Davis 90+2' |

National Stadium, Honiara
Referee: Calvin Berg (New Zealand)

== Golf ==
Papua New Guinea will enter four male and four female golfers into the Pacific Games tournament.

Individual

| Athlete | Event | Round 1 | Round 2 | Round 3 | Round 4 | Total | | |
| Athlete | Event | Score | Score | Score | Score | Score | Par | Rank |
|---|---|---|---|---|---|---|---|---|
| Morgan Annato | Men's | 70 | 76 | 71 | 69 | 286 | | 2nd place, silver medalist(s) |
| Soti Dinki | Men's | 82 | 76 | 79 | 72 | 309 | | =14 |
| Vagi James | Men's | 73 | 71 | 78 | 74 | 296 | | =4 |
| Gideon Tikili | Men's | 77 | 77 | 74 | 71 | 299 | | =6 |
| Margaret Lavaki | Women's | 76 | 77 | 78 | 77 | 308 | | =5 |
| Natalie Mok | Women's | 80 | 79 | 77 | 72 | 308 | | =5 |
| Kristine Seko | Women's | 80 | 77 | 81 | DSQ | —N/a | | |
| Aiomana Winchcombe | Women's | 86 | 90 | 84 | 85 | 345 | | 24 |

Team

| Athlete | Event | Round 1 | Round 2 | Round 3 | Round 4 | Total | | |
| Athlete | Event | Score | Score | Score | Score | Score | Par | Rank |
|---|---|---|---|---|---|---|---|---|
| Papua New Guinea men's Morgan Annato; Soti Dinki; Vagi James; Gideon Tikili | Men's team | 220 | 223 | 223 | 212 | 878 | | 2nd place, silver medalist(s) |
| Papua New Guinea women's Margaret Lavaki; Natalie Mok; Kristine Seko; Aiomana Winchcombe | Women's team | 236 | 233 | 239 | 226 | 934 | | 2nd place, silver medalist(s) |

== Netball ==
Summary

| Team | Event | Group stage | | | | | Semifinal | Final / GM / Cl. | |
| Team | Event | Opposition Result | Opposition Result | Opposition Result | Opposition Result | Rank | Opposition Result | Opposition Result | Rank |
|---|---|---|---|---|---|---|---|---|---|
| Papua New Guinea | Women's tournament | Tonga; L 54–62 | Cook Islands; W 68–36 | Vanuatu; W 98–13 | Niue; W 90–24 | 2 | Fiji; L 45–59 | Samoa; L 49–52 | 4 |

Roster

Following the Pacific Games selection trials for the Papua New Guinea national netball team on 2 September 2023, Netball Papua New Guinea announced a 17-member squad on 13 September 2023. The final twelve players were selected on 10 November 2023.

- Hana Barretto
- Shannaz Apelis
- Lesieli Taviri
- Jayden Molo
- Jeperth Tulapi (c)
- Micheala Kadlecek
- Yves Chee
- Jacklyn Lahari
- Maddison Sivyer
- Goloa Ovoa
- Kala Ali
- Rowyna Vele

== Rugby sevens ==
Summary

| Team | Event | Pool round | | | | Quarterfinal | Semifinal | Final / BM / GM | |
| Team | Event | Opposition Result | Opposition Result | Opposition Result | Rank | Opposition Result | Opposition Result | Opposition Result | Rank |
|---|---|---|---|---|---|---|---|---|---|
| Papua New Guinea men's | Men's tournament | Wallis and Futuna; W 35–0 | Tahiti; W 62–0 | Solomon Islands; W 21–10 | 1 | American Samoa; W 39–5 | Fiji; L 10–24 | Tonga; L 7–19 | 4 |
| Papua New Guinea women's | Women's tournament | American Samoa; W 35–0 | Nauru; W 31–0 | Tonga; W 33–5 | 1 | —N/a | Wallis and Futuna; W 26–5 | Fiji; L 7–17 | 2nd place, silver medalist(s) |

=== Men's tournament ===
Team roster

- Derrick Voku
- Emmanuel Alfred
- Benjamin Boas
- Benson Hayai
- Benjamin Kennedy
- Mhustapha Kura
- Kunak Late
- Kadum Mais
- Richard Mautu
- Shaun Ongapa
- Edward Ramit
- Jacky Winas

=== Women's tournament ===
Team roster

- Alice Alois
- Marie Biyama
- Esther Gigimat
- Naomie Kelly
- Helen Alo
- Janina Nightingale
- Cynthiah Peters
- Fatima Rama
- Gemma Schnaubelt
- Barbara Sigere
- Magdelene Swaki
- Joyce Taravuna

== Swimming ==
The Papua New Guinea Swimming Incorporation (PNGSI) selected a squad of eleven swimmers on 26 October 2023.

Events will be confirmed by close of entries.

Men

| Athlete | Event | Heat | | Semifinal | | Final | |
| Athlete | Event | Time | Rank | Time | Rank | Time | Rank |
|---|---|---|---|---|---|---|---|
| Thomas Chen | | | | | | | |
| Felix Devlin | | | | | | | |
| Holly John | | | | | | | |
| Josh Tarere | | | | | | | |
| Mathew Vali | | | | | | | |

Women

| Athlete | Event | Heat | | Semifinal | | Final | |
| Athlete | Event | Time | Rank | Time | Rank | Time | Rank |
|---|---|---|---|---|---|---|---|
| Abigail Ai Tom | | | | | | | |
| Joanna Chen | | | | | | | |
| Allana Kirarock | | | | | | | |
| Rhannah Makail | | | | | | | |
| Jhnayali Tokome-Garap | | | | | | | |
| Georgia-Leigh Vele | | | | | | | |

== Tennis ==
The Papua New Guinea Tennis Association announced an eight-member squad (4 men and 4 women) for the Games.

Men

| Athlete | Event | Round of 64 | Round of 32 | Round of 16 | Quarter Final | Semi Final | Final | Rank |
| Athlete | Event | Opposition Results | Opposition Result | Opposition Result | Opposition Result | Opposition Result | Opposition Result | Rank |
|---|---|---|---|---|---|---|---|---|
| Christopher Kaiulo | Singles | Justus (SOL); L 1–6, 0–6 | Did not advance | | | | | |
| Eddie Mera | Singles | Carruthers (SAM); W 6–1, 5–7, 6–2 | Ofati (TUV); L 3–6, 2–6 | Did not advance | | | | |
| Matthew Stubbings | Singles | Bye | Andre (VAN); W 6–0, 6–1 | Miki (SOL); W 6–2, 6–2 | Laisan (TAH); W 5–7, 6–3, 6–3 | Courte (NCL); L 1–6, 2–6 | Camacho (GUM); W 6–2, 6–3 | 3rd place, bronze medalist(s) |
| Mark Gibbons; Matthew Stubbings | Doubles | —N/a | Bye | Payne / Pierre (COK); W 6–2, 6–2 | Courte / Rollin (NCL); L 7–6, 3–6, 9–11 | Did not advance | | |
| Christopher Kaiuolo; Eddie Mera | Doubles | —N/a | Bye | Kelley / Laisan (TAH); L 2–6, 1–6 | Did not advance | | | |

Women

| Athlete | Event | Round of 64 | Round of 32 | Round of 16 | Quarter Final | Semi Final | Final | Rank |
| Athlete | Event | Opposition Results | Opposition Result | Opposition Result | Opposition Result | Opposition Result | Opposition Result | Rank |
|---|---|---|---|---|---|---|---|---|
| Pauline Hyun | Singles | Bye | Morgan (SOL); L 1–6, 0–6 | Did not advance | | | | |
| Michaela Mesa | Singles | Bye | Shan (TAH); L 5–7, 0–6 | Did not advance | | | | |
| Namet Sanewai | Singles | Bye | Gibson (GUM); L 1–6, 0–6 | Did not advance | | | | |
| Abigail Tere-Apisah | Singles | Bye | Ah San (SAM); W 6–0, 6–3 | Teally (SOL); W 6–1, 6–0 | Kamoe (FIJ); W 6–2, 6–1 | Schuster (SAM); W 6–0, 7–6(0) | Georgopoulos (SAM); W 7–5, 6–1 | 1st place, gold medalist(s) |
| Michaela Mesa; Namet Sanewai | Doubles | —N/a | | Teally / Waita (SOL); L 1–6, 2–6 | Did not advance | | | |

Mixed

| Athlete | Event | Round of 64 | Round of 32 | Round of 16 | Quarter Final | Semi Final | Final | Rank |
| Athlete | Event | Opposition Results | Opposition Result | Opposition Result | Opposition Result | Opposition Result | Opposition Result | Rank |
|---|---|---|---|---|---|---|---|---|
| Abigail Tere-Apisah; Matthew Stubbings | Doubles | Bye | Tealei / Pese (TUV); W 6–0, 6–2 | Chung / Laisan (TAH); W 6–1, 7–5 | Schuster / Soonalole (SAM); W 6–1, 6–3 | Kamoe / O'Connell (FIJ); W 6–4, 6–3 | Boosie / Voisin (TAH); W 6–3, 6–0 | 1st place, gold medalist(s) |
| Pauline Hyun; Mark Gibbons | Doubles | Bye | Vakaukamea / Huni (TGA); L 5–7, 3–6 | Did not advance | | | | |
| Michaela Mesa; Eddie Mera | Doubles | Bye | Nigelita / Kanano (NRU); W 6–2, 6–0 | Boosie / Voisin (TAH); L 1–6, 0–6 | Did not advance | | | |
| Namet Sanewai; Christopher Kaiuolo | Doubles | Bye | Packbier / Caldwell (GUM) w/o | Did not advance | | | | |

Team event

| Team | Event | Preliminary round | | | | Semifinals | Final / BM | |
| Team | Event | Opposition Score | Opposition Score | Opposition Score | Rank | Opposition Score | Opposition Score | Rank |
|---|---|---|---|---|---|---|---|---|
| Papua New Guinea men's | Men's team | Tonga; W 3–0 | Guam; L 0–2 | —N/a | 2 | did not advance | | |
| Papua New Guinea women's | Women's team | Nauru; W 3–0 | Tonga; W 2–1 | —N/a | 1 Q | Solomon Islands; L 1–2 | Tonga; W 2–0 | 3rd place, bronze medalist(s) |

== Touch rugby ==
Summary

| Team | Event | Round-robin | | | | | | | | Semifinal | Final | |
| Team | Event | Opposition Score | Opposition Score | Opposition Score | Opposition Score | Opposition Score | Opposition Score | Opposition Score | Rank | Opposition Score | Opposition Score | Rank |
|---|---|---|---|---|---|---|---|---|---|---|---|---|
| Papua New Guinea men's | Men's | (Kiribati) Kiribati; W 18–2 | (Solomon Islands) Solomon Islands; W 14–2 | (Cook Islands) Cook Islands; W 6–2 | (Niue) Niue; W 5–1 | (Fiji) Fiji; W 3–2 | (Samoa) Samoa; D 2–2 | Norfolk Island – | 1 | (Niue) Niue; W 3–2 | (Samoa) Samoa; L 7–8 | 2nd place, silver medalist(s) |
| Papua New Guinea women's | Women's | (Niue) Niue; W 10–3 | (Solomon Islands) Solomon Islands; W 18–0 | (Cook Islands) Cook Islands; W 9–2 | (Fiji) Fiji; D 4–4 | (Samoa) Samoa; W 3–2 | —N/a | | 1 | (Cook Islands) Cook Islands; W 7–5 | (Samoa) Samoa; L 7–8 | 2nd place, silver medalist(s) |
| Papua New Guinea mixed | Mixed | (Niue) Niue; W 6–3 | (Solomon Islands) Solomon Islands; W 13–1 | (Cook Islands) Cook Islands; W 9–3 | (Fiji) Fiji; D 6–6 | (Samoa) Samoa; L 6–7 | —N/a | | 2 | (Fiji) Fiji; W 6–5 | (Samoa) Samoa; L 6–7 | 2nd place, silver medalist(s) |

=== Men's tournament ===
Men's roster

- David Aruha
- Casper Berry
- Eugene Eka
- Freddy Gelam
- Ken Gogote
- Junior Hoki
- Sam Hoki
- Kele Lessy
- Farapo Makura
- Ravu Ravu
- Suckling Ray
- Andrew Turlom
- Bobby Vavona
- Elison Waluka

=== Women's tournament ===
Women's roster

- Grace Kouba
- Natalie Kuper
- Nadya Taubuso
- Angelena Watego
- Maria Alu
- Mangai Elomi
- Georgina Genaka
- Angela Geno
- Emmalyn John
- Kelly Peter
- Rita Rema
- Monica Teite
- Joylyne Tikot
- Vavine Yore

=== Mixed tournament ===
Mixed team roster

- Mixed team event – one team of 14 players from men's and women's squads

== Volleyball ==
=== Beach ===
Papua New Guinea Volleyball Federation (PNGVF) will enter one men's and one women's pair.

| Athlete | Event | Preliminary round | | | | Quarterfinals | Semifinals | Final / GM | |
| Athlete | Event | Opposition Score | Opposition Score | Opposition Score | Rank | Opposition Score | Opposition Score | Opposition Score | Rank |
|---|---|---|---|---|---|---|---|---|---|
| Damien Aisi; Tonnie Gima | Men's | Malosa / Isaac (TUV); L (17–21, 21–13, 11–15) | Mare / Paraue (TAH); W (25–23, 13–21, 15–12) | Coleman / Vaea (ASA); W (21–14, 21–16) | | – | – | – | |
| Lauren Allen; Veuga Sinari | Women's | Speed / Nima (FIJ); L (17–21, 21–13, 11–15) | U'Una / Puia (SOL); L (8–21, 14–21) | —N/a | 3 | – | – | – | |

=== Indoor ===
Summary

| Team | Event | Preliminary round | | | | | Quarterfinals | Semifinals | Final / GM | |
| Team | Event | Opposition Score | Opposition Score | Opposition Score | Opposition Score | Rank | Opposition Score | Opposition Score | Opposition Score | Rank |
|---|---|---|---|---|---|---|---|---|---|---|
| Papua New Guinea men's | Men's | Tuvalu; W 3–0 | American Samoa; W 3–1 | Fiji; W 3–0 | French Polynesia; W 3–2 | 1 | Tonga; W 3–0 | New Caledonia; W 3–1 | French Polynesia; L 0–3 | 2nd place, silver medalist(s) |
| Papua New Guinea women's | Women's | Solomon Islands; W 3–2 | French Polynesia; L 0–3 | American Samoa; L 0–3 | —N/a | 3 | Fiji; L 0–3 | Did not advance | | |

==== Men's tournament ====
Team roster

- Edward Aisi
- Alipat Ani
- Billy Anton
- Heni Botiba
- Arnold Daera
- Rolley Forova
- Junior Harold Gima
- David John
- Andrew Kapi
- Joe Mora
- Koi Onne
- John Soi
- Eka Solomon
- Paul Solomon

==== Women's tournament ====
Team roster

The roster was announced 8 November 2023.

Head coach: Ula Gima

- Lois Garena (c) OS
- Hitolo Raka MB
- Jaynar Bernard L
- Clara Vele S
- Sauera Dandi S
- Melisa Pokana S
- Theresa Fagau A
- Pepetua Anadu MB
- Veanne Ane MB
- Kemmy Manoni OS
- Pelehi Tupagogo OS
- Elisha Bird MB
- Antoinette Aisakana OS
- Taren Walo L

== Weightlifting ==
The Papua New Guinea Weightlifting Federation selected 24 weightlifters (16 men, 8 women) for the 2023 Games. According to the Games charter, each Pacific Games Association is allowed a maximum 20 lifters (10 men, 10 women), hence, six male lifters will be omitted prior to the start of competition.

Men

| Athlete | Event | Snatch | Rank | Clean & jerk | Rank | Total | Rank |
|---|---|---|---|---|---|---|---|
| Gahuna Nauari | 55 kg | 88 kg | 4 | NL | – | – | – |
| Simeon Dago | 55 kg | 85 kg | 6 | 105 kg | 5 | 190 kg | 5 |
| Morea Baru | 61 kg | 123 kg | 1st place, gold medalist(s) | NL | – | – | – |
| Kevau Baru | 61 kg | 88 kg | 4 | 118 kg | 5 | 206 kg | 4 |
| Kari Kari | 67 kg | 97 kg | 5 | 125 kg | 6 | 222 kg | 6 |
| Sepa Junior Simoi | 96 kg | 122 kg | 6 | 161 kg | 6 | 283 kg | 6 |

Women

| Athlete | Event | Snatch | Rank | Clean & jerk | Rank | Total | Rank |
|---|---|---|---|---|---|---|---|
| Konio Toua | 45 kg | 50 kg | 3rd place, bronze medalist(s) | 66 kg | 2nd place, silver medalist(s) | 116 kg | 2nd place, silver medalist(s) |
| Bede Igo | 45 kg | 51 kg | 2nd place, silver medalist(s) | 56 kg | 3rd place, bronze medalist(s) | 107 kg | 3rd place, bronze medalist(s) |
| Dika Toua | 49 kg | 76 kg | 1st place, gold medalist(s) | 90 kg | 1st place, gold medalist(s) | 166 kg | 1st place, gold medalist(s) |
| Thelma Toua | 49 kg | 66 kg | 2nd place, silver medalist(s) | 82 kg | 3rd place, bronze medalist(s) | 148 kg | 3rd place, bronze medalist(s) |
| Noi Igo | 87 kg | 86 kg | 3rd place, bronze medalist(s) | 109 kg | 2nd place, silver medalist(s) | 195 kg | 3rd place, bronze medalist(s) |
