= Tuvalu at the 2023 Pacific Games =

- Flag of Tuvalu
- National federation: Tuvalu Association of Sports and National Olympic Committee

in Honiara, Solomon Islands 19 November 2023 – 2 December 2023
- Flag bearer: Ioane Hawaii
- Medals Ranked 20th: Gold 0 Silver 5 Bronze 0 Total 5

Pacific Games appearances (overview)
- 1979; 1983–1995; 1999; 2003; 2007; 2011; 2015; 2019; 2023

Tuvalu participated in the 2023 Pacific Games in Honiara, Solomon Islands from 19 November to 2 December 2023.

Tuvalu made its first appearance at the 1979 South Pacific Games held in Suva, Fiji.

In the 2023 Pacific Games, team members won silver medals:

- Manuila Raobu in Weightlifting at the 2023 Pacific Games: 73 kg Snatch - 125 kg, 73 kg Clean & jerk - 152 kg, 73 kg Total - 277 kg.
- Maka Foster Ofati and Faolina Tepa Haleti in Tennis Men’s doubles.

== Competitors ==
The following is the list of number of competitors in the Games.

Sport	Men	Women	Total
Athletics	7	2	9
Boxing	1	0	1
Football	23	0	23
Powerlifting	1	0	1
Rugby Union 7s	12	0	12
Table tennis	4	0	4
Tennis	4	1	5
Indoor Volleyball	11	12	23
Weightlifting	2	1	3
Total	65	16	81

== Athletics ==
Tuvalu entered a track and field team. The Men’s Men 4x100 metre relay team finished 6th.

The Tuvalu Association of Sports and National Olympic Committee (TASNOC) organizes Tuvalu's participation in the Pacific Games.

Key

- Note–Ranks given for track events are within the athlete's heat only
- Q = Qualified for the next round
- q = Qualified for the next round as a fastest loser or, in field events, by position without achieving the qualifying target
- qR = Qualified to the next round by referee judgement
- NR = National record
- N/A = Round not applicable for the event
- Bye = Athlete not required to compete in round

Track events
Men

Athlete	Event	Heat		Semifinal		Final	
Athlete	Event	Result	Rank	Result	Rank	Result	Rank
Karalo Maibuca	100 m	Heat 4, time of 11.35 seconds	6th	Did not advance			
Karalo Maibuca	200 m	Heat 4, time of 23.31 seconds	4th	Heat 2, time of 23.66 seconds	7th	Did not advance	
Kanae Saloa Malua	100 m	Heat 5, time of 11.40 seconds	6th	Did not advance			
Kanae Saloa Malua	200 m	Heat 4, time of 23.31 seconds	4th	Did not advance			
Iosefa Tamoa	100 m	Heat 1, time of 12.11 seconds	6th	Did not advance			
Iosefa Tamoa	200 m	Heat 3, time of 24.71 seconds	5th	Did not advance			
Londoni Tiso	200 m	Heat 2, time of 23.87 seconds	6th	Heat 1, time of 24.12 seconds	6th	Did not advance	
John Fola O’Brien	400 m	Heat 1, time of 55:04 seconds	5th	Did not advance			
Karalo Maibuca, Kanae Saloa Malua, Londoni Tiso, Kaumoana Teaitala	4x100 m relay	Heat 2, time of 43.56 seconds	3rd	—	—	Time of 43.29 seconds	6th

Women

Athlete	Event	Heat		Semifinal		Final	
Athlete	Event	Result	Rank	Result	Rank	Result	Rank
Vaioleta Luka	100 m	Heat 2, time of 13.30 seconds	7th	Did not advance			
Temalini Manatoa	100 m	Heat 3, time of 13.52 seconds	7th	Did not advance			

Field events
Men

Athlete	Event	Final	
Athlete	Event	Distance	Position
Pisilele Matio	Javelin Throw 800g	48.75 m	12th
Londoni Tiso	Triple jump	13.12 m	6th

source= SOL23

== Boxing ==
Athlete	Event	Preliminary Round	Quarterfinals	Semifinals	Final	
Athlete	Event	Opposition Result	Opposition Result	Opposition Result	Opposition Result	Rank
Fiu Tui	Boxing LMW 70F/71M OQ-68-71 kg Male	Melman Halstead (NRU); L 0-5	Did not advance			

== Football ==
The Tuvalu national football team experience travel delays, so that they were forced to forfeit their first game against Papua New Guinea.

Men’s football competition

Team	Event	Preliminary round		Playoff round	Playoff round	Rank
Team	Event	Opposition Score	Opposition Score	Opposition Score	Opposition Score	
Tuvalu national football team	Men's football	Papua New Guinea; Forfeited	Vanuatu; L 0-6	Tonga; W 4-0	Northern Mariana Islands; W 4-1	9th

source= SOL23

== Powerlifting ==
Men

Athlete	Event	Total	Rank
Molu Laupepa	Powerlifting Male 105 kg Male	595.0	8th

== Rugby Union Sevens ==
Tuvalu entered a rugby 7s team for the first time at the Pacific Games.

Summary

Team	Event	Pool round				Quarter final	Playoff	Final	
Team	Event	Opposition Result	Opposition Result	Opposition Result	Rank	Opposition Result	Opposition Result	Opposition Result	Rank
Tuvalu Men's	Men's Pool B	Vanuatu; L 17-19	Samoa; L 14-26	—		Nauru; W 15-10	Tahiti; W 15-0	Did not advance	

== Table tennis ==
=== Men's Table Tennis Singles event ===
Malton Melton participated in the Men’s Singles event.

Tanielu Soa participated in the Singles Ambulant Male event.

Ioane Hawaii and Taupaka Uatea participated in the Singles Seated Male event.

Men’s Singles

Athlete	Event	Group Round	Group Round	Group Round	Round 1	Quarter Final	Semi Final	Final
Athlete	Event	Opposition Results	Opposition Result	Opposition Result	Opposition Result			
Kalton Melton	Men’s Singles	Ocean Belrose (TAH); L 0-3	Inoke Pauu Pepa (GUM); W 3-0	Inoke Pauu Pepa (GUM); W 3-0	Joshua Yee (FIJ); L 0-4	Did not advance		

Singles Ambulant Male

Athlete	Event	Round 1	Quarter Final	Semi Final	Final
Athlete	Event	Opposition Results	Opposition Result		
Tanielu Soa	Singles Ambulant Male	Milo Toleafoa (TGA); W 3-1	Alain Barbu (NCL); L 1-2	Did not advance	

Singles Seated Male

Athlete	Event	Round 1	Round 2	Round 3	Quarter Final	Semi Final	Final
Athlete	Event	Opposition Results	Opposition Result	Opposition Result	Opposition Result		
Ioane Hawaii	Singles Seated Male	Roland Djaoua (NCL); W 3-1	James Goulding (NZL); L 0-3	—	Vincent Tehei (TAH); L 1-3	Did not advance	
Taupaka Uatea	Singles Seated Male	Shadrack Timothy (SOL); L 0-3	Siaosi Vaka (TGA); L 0-3	Iakoba Taubakoa (FIJ); L 0-3	Did not advance		

=== Men's Table Tennis Para Team event ===
Tuvalu sent a team of 3 to the para table tennis competition: Ioane Hawaii, Tanielu Soa and Taupaka Uatea.

Men’s Para Table Tennis Team event

Team	Event	Preliminary round				Semifinals	Final / BM	
Team	Event	Opposition Score	Opposition Score	Opposition Score	Rank	Opposition Score	Opposition Score	Rank
Ioane Hawaii, Tanielu Soa, Taupaka Uatea	Men's Para team	Solomon Islands (SOL); L 1–4	New Caledonia (NCL); W 3-2	Tonga (TGA); W 3-2		French Polynesia (TAH); L 0-3	Papua New Guinea (PNG); L 0-3	4th

source= SOL23

== Tennis ==
Maka Foster Ofati and Faolina Tepa Haleti, and also Mathew Pese and Felo Feoto, participated in the men's doubles event.

Mathew Pese and Sanapu Tepa Tealei participated in the mixed doubles event.

Faolaina Tepa Haleti, Mathew Pese, Felo Feoto and Maka Foster Ofati participated in the men's singles event.

Men’s Singles

Athlete	Event	Round of 64	Round of 32	Round of 16	Quarter Final	Semi Final	Final
Athlete	Event	Opposition Results	Opposition Result	Opposition Result			
Mathew Pese	Men’s singles	Sebastian Payne (COK); W 6-2, 6-2	Daniel Llarenas (GUM); W 6-3, 6-4	Heimanarii Lai San (TAH); L 6-7, 3-6	Did not advance		
Maka Foster Ofati	Men’s singles	Bye	Israel Mera (GUM); W 6-3, 6-2	Camden Camacho (GUM); L 4-6, 5-7	Did not advance		
Faolaina Tepa Haleti	Men’s singles	Samuel Ramoni (SOL); L 6-1, 6-1	Did not advance				
Felo Feoto	Men’s singles	June Yu (NMI); L 6-1, 6-4	Did not advance				

Women’s Singles

Athlete	Event	Round of 64	Round of 32	Round of 16	Quarter Final	Semi Final	Final
Athlete	Event	Opposition Results	Opposition Result				
Sanapu Tepa Tealei	Women’s Singles	—	Ela I Puleni Vakaukamea (TGA); L 6-2, 2-6, 3-6	Did not advance			

Tennis Men’s Doubles

Athlete	Event	Round of 32	Round of 16	Quarter Final	Semi Final	Final	Rank
Athlete	Event	Opposition Results	Opposition Result	Opposition Result	Opposition Result	Opposition Result	Rank
Maka Foster Ofati, Faolina Tepa Haleti	Men's Doubles	Bye	Guam; W 6-4, 6-0	French Polynesia; W 3-6, 6-4, 10-8	New Caledonia; W 7-6, 4-6, 10-8	Fiji; L 5-7, 2-6	Silver medal
Mathew Pese, Felo Feoto	Men's Doubles	Vanuatu; L 1-6, 5-7					

Mixed Doubles

Athlete	Event	Round of 32	Round of 16	Quarter Final	Semi Final	Final
Athlete	Event	Opposition Results	Opposition Result			
Mathew Pese, Sanapu Tepa Tealei	Mixed Doubles	Cook Islands; W 6-1, 6-4	Papua New Guinea; L 0-6, 2-6	Did not advance		

Tennis Team Event

Team	Event	Preliminary round				Semifinals	Final
Team	Event	Opposition Score	Opposition Score	Opposition Score	Rank		
Maka Foster Ofati, Faolina Tepa Haleti	Men's Team Group D	New Caledonia; L 0-3	Nauru; W 3-0	Cook Islands; W 2-0	2nd	Did not advance	

source= SOL23
tournamentsoftware.com

== Volleyball ==
=== Indoor ===
Men’s team: Suifita Malaelua Tepoga, Kato Paani Lopeta, Kilifi Keli, Ionatana Nemaia, Kanae Saloa Tauia Malua, Kaitu Kaitu, Usa Patikata, Lotogalue Napoe, Krizz Pasivao and Mitilelei Shalom Fiamalua.

Women’s team: Mesepele Lauti, Masetapu Freda Jr Resture, Kalite Penaia, Loliza Pasefika, Minime Kitiseni, Lilian Tusitala, Sepoima Tokaga, Savali Silafaga Teuina, Lafotua Grace Pelesipene Fiamalua, Meleala Timena, Aloiti Namoto and Sepola Ioelu.

Athlete	Event	Preliminary round				Quarterfinals	Semifinals	Final
Athlete	Event	Opposition Score	Opposition Score	Opposition Score	Opposition Score	Opposition Score		
Men’s team	Men's Pool B	Papua New Guinea; L 0-3	French Polynesia; L 0-3	Fiji; L 1-3	American Samoa; L 1-3	Did not advance		
Women’s team	Women's Pool B	Samoa; L 0-3	Fiji; L 0-3	New Caledonia; L 0-3	—	French Polynesia; L 0-3	Did not advance	

source= SOL23

== Weightlifting ==
The Tuvalu Weightlifting Federation sent 3 weightlifters to the 2023 Games.

=== Men's tournament ===
Athlete	Event	Snatch	Rank	Clean & jerk	Rank	Total	Rank
Manuila Raobu	Men's 73 kg	125 kg	Silver medal	152 kg	Silver medal	277 kg	Silver medal
Kaueta Kausea	Men's 89 kg	117 kg	9th	151 kg	9th	268 kg	9th

=== Women's tournament ===
Athlete	Event	Snatch	Rank	Clean & jerk	Rank	Total	Rank
Malia Timo	Women's 87 kg	78 kg	5th	92 kg	6th	170 kg	5th

source= SOL23
