= Fiji at the 2023 Pacific Games =

- Flag of Fiji
- IOC code: FIJ

in Honiara, Solomon Islands 19 November 2023 – 2 December 2023
- Competitors: 592
- Flag bearer: Taniela Rainibogi
- Medals Ranked 6th: Gold 21 Silver 30 Bronze 40 Total 91

Pacific Games appearances
- 1963; 1966; 1969; 1971; 1975; 1979; 1983; 1987; 1991; 1995; 1999; 2003; 2007; 2011; 2015; 2019; 2023

Fiji competed at the 2023 Pacific Games in Honiara, Solomon Islands from 19 November to 2 December 2023. These games were Fiji's seventeenth appearance since first participating in the first edition in 1963.

== Competitors ==
The following is the list of number of competitors confirmed for the Games.

Sport	Men	Women	Total
Basketball	16	16	32
Field hockey	9	9	18
Football	23	23	46
Netball	—	12	12
Rugby sevens	12	12	24
Tennis	4	4	8
Touch rugby	14	14	28
Volleyball	14	14	28
Total	92	104	196

== Athletic ==
=== Men's athletics ===
Track and road events

Athlete	Event	Heat		Semifinal		Final	
Athlete	Event	Result	Rank	Result	Rank	Result	Rank
Joshua Daudravuni	100 metres						
Emosi Laqere	100 metres						
Ratu Penaia Ramasirai	100 metres						
Waisake Tewa	100 metres						
Joshua Daudravuni	200 metres						
Waisake Tewa	200 metres						
Jonacani Koroi	200 metres						
Jonacani Koroi	400 metres						
Sailasa Moala	400 metres						
Samuela Railoa	400 metres						
Sailasa Moala	800 metres						
Vishant Reddy	800 metres						
Vishant Reddy	1500 metres	—					
Yeshnil Karan	1500 metres	—					
Evueli Toia	1500 metres	—					
Yeshnil Karan	5000 metres	—					
Evueli Toia	5000 metres	—					
Yeshnil Karan	10,000 metres	—					
Evueli Toia	10,000 metres	—					
Avikash Lal	10,000 metres	—					
Yeshnil Karan	Half marathon	—					
Avikash Lal	Half marathon	—					
Errol Qaqa	110 metres hurdles	—					
Yeshnil Karan	3000 metres steeplechase	—					
Evueli Toia	3000 metres steeplechase	—					
	4×100 metre relay	—					
	4×400 metre relay	—					
	100 metres ambulant						

Field events

Athlete	Event	Final	
Athlete	Event	Distance	Position
	High jump		
	Pole vault		
	Long jump		
	Triple jump		
	Shot put		
	Discus throw		
	Hammer throw		
	Javelin throw		
	Shot put secured		

Combined events – Decathlon

Athlete	Event	100 m	LJ	SP	HJ	400 m	110H	DT	PV	JT	1500 m	Final	Rank
	Result												
	Points												

== Basketball ==
=== 5×5 basketball ===
Summary

Team	Event	Preliminary round				Qualifying finals	Semifinals	Final / GM	
Team	Event	Opposition Score	Opposition Score	Opposition Score	Rank	Opposition Score	Opposition Score	Opposition Score	Rank
Fiji Men's	Men's	Tahiti; W 70-45	Tonga	New Caledonia					
Fiji Women's	Women's	Solomon Islands; W 82-43	Guam; W 55-40	Samoa					

=== 3×3 basketball ===
Summary

Team	Event	Pool play						Semifinals	Final / GM	
Team	Event	Opposition Score	Opposition Score	Opposition Score	Opposition Score	Opposition Score	Rank	Opposition Score	Opposition Score	Rank
Fiji men's	Men's tournament	Guam	Cook Islands	Palau	Tonga	French Polynesia				
Fiji women's	Women's tournament	Marshall Islands	Samoa	Cook Islands	Solomon Islands	—				

==== Men's tournament ====
Group play

Pos	Team	Pld	W	L	PF	PA	PD	Pts	Qualification
1	Fiji	1	1	0	70	45	+25	2	Advance to the semi-final round
2	New Caledonia	0	0	0	0	0	0	0	Advance to the quarter-final round
3	Tonga	0	0	0	0	0	0	0	Advance to the quarter-final round
4	Tahiti	1	0	1	45	70	−25	1	Advance to the classification round

Source: FIBA Oceania
Rules for classification: a. points; b. win–loss record; c. goal average; d. head-to-head records; e. quotient system

18 November 2023
09:00

Report

Fiji	70–45	Tahiti
Scoring by quarter: 19-9, 14-16, 16-10, 21-10

Friendship Hall, Honiara

20 November 2023
18:00

Report

Fiji	vs.	Tonga

Friendship Hall, Honiara

21 November 2023
15:45

Report

New Caledonia	vs.	Fiji

Friendship Hall, Honiara

==== Women's tournament ====
Group play

Pos	Team	Pld	W	L	PF	PA	PD	Pts	Qualification
1	Samoa	2	2	0	152	90	+62	4	Advance to the semi-final round
2	Fiji	2	2	0	137	83	+54	4	Advance to the quarter-final round
3	Guam	2	0	2	84	124	−40	2	Advance to the quarter-final round
4	Solomon Islands (H)	2	0	2	89	165	−76	2	Advance to the classification round

Source: FIBA Oceania
Rules for classification: a. points; b. win–loss record; c. goal average; d. head-to-head records; e. quotient system
(H) Hosts

18 November 2023
13:30

Report

Fiji	82–43	Solomon Islands
Scoring by quarter: 21-14, 29-11, 12-3, 20-15

Friendship Hall, Honiara

19 November 2023
11:15

Report

Fiji	55–40	Guam
Scoring by quarter: 14-10, 9-9, 18-19, 14-2

Friendship Hall, Honiara

20 November 2023
09:00

Report

Samoa	vs.	Fiji

Friendship Hall, Honiara

== Field hockey ==
Summary

Key:

- FT = After full time
- P = Match decided by penalty-shootout

Team	Event	Round-robin						Semifinal	Final	
Team	Event	Opposition Score	Opposition Score	Opposition Score	Opposition Score	Opposition Score	Rank	Opposition Score	Opposition Score	Rank
Fiji men's	Men's tournament	Samoa	Tonga	Vanuatu	Solomon Islands	Papua New Guinea				
Fiji women's	Women's tournament	Samoa	Vanuatu	Tonga	Papua New Guinea	Samoa				

== Football ==
Summary

Team	Event	Preliminary round				Semifinal	Final	
Team	Event	Opposition Score	Opposition Score	Opposition Score	Rank	Opposition Score	Opposition Score	Rank
Fiji men's	Men's	Northern Mariana Islands; W 10-0	Tahiti	—				
Fiji women's	Women's	Vanuatu	Solomon Islands	—				

=== Men's tournament ===
Group play

Pos	Team	Pld	W	D	L	GF	GA	GD	Pts	Qualification
1	Fiji	1	1	0	0	10	0	+10	3	Knockout stage
2	Tahiti	0	0	0	0	0	0	0	0	
3	Northern Mariana Islands	1	0	0	1	0	10	−10	0	

First match(es) will be played: 18 November 2023. Source: SOL23
18 November 2023
19:00

Fiji	10–0	Northern Mariana Islands
Begg 1'; Krishna 6', 8', 35'; Nalaubu 18', 43'; Dogalau 56'; Khan 61'; Dunn 66'; Matanisiga 82'	Report

SIFF Academy Field, Honiara
Referee: Timothy Niu (Solomon Islands)

24 November 2023
19:00

Fiji	0-0	Tahiti

SIFF Academy Field, Honiara

=== Women's tournament ===
Group play

Pos	Team	Pld	W	D	L	GF	GA	GD	Pts	Qualification
1	Fiji	0	0	0	0	0	0	0	0	Knockout stage
2	Vanuatu	0	0	0	0	0	0	0	0	
3	Solomon Islands (H)	0	0	0	0	0	0	0	0	

First match(es) will be played: 18 November 2023. Source: SOL23
(H) Hosts

21 November 2023
15:00

Fiji	v	Vanuatu

Lawson Tama Stadium, Honiara

24 November 2023
15:00

Fiji	v	Solomon Islands

Lawson Tama Stadium, Honiara

== Netball ==
Summary

Team	Event	Group stage					Semifinal	Final / BM / Cl.	
Team	Event	Opposition Result	Opposition Result	Opposition Result	Opposition Result	Rank	Opposition Result	Opposition Result	Rank
Fiji women's	Women's tournament	Solomon Islands	Samoa	Norfolk Island	—				

== Rugby sevens ==
Summary

Team	Event	Pool round				Quarterfinal	Semifinal	Final / BM	
Team	Event	Opposition Result	Opposition Result	Opposition Result	Rank	Opposition Result	Opposition Result	Opposition Result	Rank
Fiji men's	Men's tournament	American Samoa	Kiribati	—					
Fiji women's	Women's tournament	Wallis and Futuna	Solomon Islands	Cook Islands					

== Table tennis ==
=== Individual event ===
Men

Athlete	Event	Round of 32	Round of 16	Quarter Final	Semi Final	Final	Rank
Athlete	Event	Opposition Results	Opposition Result	Opposition Result	Opposition Result	Opposition Result	Rank
Wu Vicky	Singles						
Yee Joshua	Singles						
Zhang Baiyan	Singles						
Yee Joshua; Wu Vicky	Doubles						

Women

Athlete	Event	Round of 32	Round of 16	Quarter Final	Semi Final	Final	Rank
Athlete	Event	Opposition Results	Opposition Result	Opposition Result	Opposition Result	Opposition Result	Rank
Li Carolyn	Singles						
Yee Sally	Singles						
Yee Grace Rosi	Singles						
Yee Sally; Yee Grace Rosi	Doubles						

Mixed

Athlete	Event	Round of 32	Round of 16	Quarter Final	Semi Final	Final	Rank
Athlete	Event	Opposition Results	Opposition Result	Opposition Result	Opposition Result	Opposition Result	Rank
Li Carolyn; Zhang Baiyan	Doubles						
Yee Sally; Wu Vicky	Doubles						
Yee Grace Rosi; Yee Joshua	Doubles						

=== Team event ===
Team	Event	Preliminary round				Semifinals	Final / GM	
Team	Event	Opposition Score	Opposition Score	Opposition Score	Rank	Opposition Score	Opposition Score	Rank
Fiji men's	Men's team	Palau	Papua New Guinea	Wallis and Futuna				
Fiji women's	Women's team	Solomon Islands	Samoa	—				
Fiji Para women's	Women's Para team	—					Solomon Islands	

== Tennis ==
Team event

Team	Event	Preliminary round				Semifinals	Final / GM	
Team	Event	Opposition Score	Opposition Score	Opposition Score	Rank	Opposition Score	Opposition Score	Rank
Fiji men's	Men's team	Solomon Islands; W 3-0	Samoa	—				
Fiji women's	Women's team	Solomon Islands; L 0-3	French Polynesia; L 1-2	Vanuatu				

== Touch rugby ==
Summary

Team	Event	Round-robin								Semifinal	Final	
Team	Event	Opposition Score	Opposition Score	Opposition Score	Opposition Score	Opposition Score	Opposition Score	Opposition Score	Rank	Opposition Score	Opposition Score	Rank
Fiji men's	Men's	Samoa	(Norfolk Island) Norfolk Islands	Kiribati	Solomon Islands	Papua New Guinea	Niue	(Cook Islands) Cook Island				
Fiji women's	Women's	Solomon Islands	Papua New Guinea	Kiribati	Samoa	Niue	Cook Islands	—				
Fiji mixed	Mixed	Solomon Islands	Papua New Guinea	Kiribati	Samoa	Niue	Cook Islands	—				

== Volleyball ==
=== Indoor ===
Summary

Team	Event	Preliminary round					Quarterfinals	Semifinals	Final / GM	
Team	Event	Opposition Score	Opposition Score	Opposition Score	Opposition Score	Rank	Opposition Score	Opposition Score	Opposition Score	Rank
Fiji men's	Men's	French Polynesia; L 1-3	American Samoa; W 3-1	Tuvalu	Papua New Guinea					
Fiji women's	Women's	New Caledonia; L 1-3	Samoa	Tuvalu	—					
