= Niue national touch rugby team =

- Association: Niue Touch Association
- Head coach: Jason Silimaka (men); Alec Palupe (women)
- Website: Website

The Niue national touch rugby team is the international touch rugby team that represents the self-governing island country of Niue. It is controlled by the Niue Touch Association.

== History ==
=== 2023 Pacific Games ===
The team took part in the 2023 Pacific Games, held in Honiara. The team finished fourth in the men's tournament, fourth in the women's tournament, and fifth in the mixed tournament.

== Coaching staff ==
As of 1 November 2023

=== Men's ===
Position	Name
Head coach	(Niue) Jason Silimaka
Assistant coach	(Niue) Quincy Ikifana
Physio	(Niue) Tamar Emerym
Manager	(Niue) Josilina Silimaka

=== Women's ===
Position	Name
Head coach	(Niue) Alec Palupe
Assistant coach	(Niue) Bronson Edwards
Manager	(Niue) Zelda Nicoll

== Players ==
As of 1 November 2023

=== Men's ===
- Troy Harrison
- Tana Love-Hepi
- Ngakau Perry
- Patrick Moore-Lam
- Nathaniel Manase
- Torynn Atamu
- Joel Stowers
- Taimana Simi
- Riwhi Rex-George
- Honour Silimaka
- Jeremiah Makavilitogia
- Joshua Scully
- Tyrese Coromandel
- Heaven Silimaka

=== Women's ===
- Brytten Reynolds
- Lisa Vaimalu
- Mariko Viliko Edwards
- Quilaine Papua
- Sheeniell Viliko
- Teri King
- Turiti Galiki
- Harmony Perry
- Truniqua Silimaka
- Tracey Palupe
- Peyton Holamotu
- Xanthe Vaimalu
- Jaimee Holamotutama
- Brooke Holamotutama

== Honors ==
=== Men's U-20 ===
- Asia Pacific Youth Touch Cup

Third place (1): (bronze) 2023

- Youth World Cup

Third place (1): (bronze) 2001

=== Men's Over-40 ===
- Touch Football World Cup

Third place (1): (bronze) 2011

=== Mixed ===
- Touch Football World Cup

Second place (1): (silver) 2015 (Division 2)

=== Mixed U-18 ===
- Youth World Cup

Third place (1): (bronze) 2001
