= Norfolk Island at the 2023 Pacific Games =

- Flag of Norfolk Island
- National federation: Norfolk Island Amateur Sports and Commonwealth Games Association

in Honiara, Solomon Islands 19 November 2023 – 2 December 2023
- Competitors: 30 (16 men and 14 women) in 5 sports
- Flag bearer: Mal Tarrant
- Officials: Mal Tarrant (chef de mission)
- Medals Ranked 23rd: Gold 0 Silver 0 Bronze 1 Total 1

Pacific Games appearances
- 1979; 1983; 1987; 1991; 1995; 1999; 2003; 2007; 2011; 2015; 2019; 2023

Norfolk Island competed at the 2023 Pacific Games in Honiara, Solomon Islands from 19 November to 2 December 2023. This was Norfolk Island's twelfth appearance at the Pacific Games since first competing in 1979.

== Competitors ==
The following is the list of number of competitors in the Games.

Sport	Men	Women	Total
Athletics	1	1	2
Boxing	1	0	1
Netball	—N/a	12	12
Touch rugby	14	0	14
Va'a	0	1	1
Total	16	14	30

== Athletics ==
Athletics Norfolk Island have selected two athletes (one male and one female).

Key

- Note–Ranks given for track events are within the athlete's heat only
- Q = Qualified for the next round
- q = Qualified for the next round as a fastest loser or, in field events, by position without achieving the qualifying target
- qR = Qualified to the next round by referee judgement
- NR = National record
- N/A = Round not applicable for the event
- Bye = Athlete not required to compete in round

Men – field events

Athlete	Event	Heat		Final	
Athlete	Event	Result	Rank	Result	Rank
Brentt Jones	Hammer throw				

Women – field events

Athlete	Event	Heat		Final	
Athlete	Event	Result	Rank	Result	Rank
Taleyah Jones	Shot put				
Taleyah Jones	Discus throw				
Taleyah Jones	Hammer throw				

== Boxing ==
Norfolk Island entered one boxer for the games.

Athlete	Event	Round of 32	Round of 16	Quarterfinals	Semifinals	Final	
Athlete	Event	Opposition Result	Opposition Result	Opposition Result	Opposition Result	Opposition Result	Rank
Rhys Schmitz		–	–	–	–	–	

== Netball ==
The Norfolk Island national netball team was announced on 29 October 2023 along with the rest of the Norfolk Island Pacific Games contingent.

Summary

Team	Event	Group stage				Semifinal	Final / BM / Cl.	
Team	Event	Opposition Result	Opposition Result	Opposition Result	Rank	Opposition Result	Opposition Result	Rank
Norfolk Island	Women's tournament	Samoa; L 14-73	Solomon Islands; W 40-34	Fiji; L 16-98	3	Did not qualify	Did not qualify	6

Team roster

- Amelia Murry
- Amy Steven
- Bekki Meers
- Candice Nobbs
- Emily Ryves
- Jordan Murray
- Kylie Sterling
- Lara Bigg
- Mere Sadrata
- Rianna Christian
- Tahlia Evans
- Tyla Bigg

== Touch rugby ==
Norfolk Island entered a single touch rugby team in the men's tournament. This was their debut touch rugby appearance at the Pacific Games.

Summary

Team	Event	Round-robin								Semifinal	Final	
Team	Event	Opposition Score	Opposition Score	Opposition Score	Opposition Score	Opposition Score	Opposition Score	Opposition Score	Rank	Opposition Score	Opposition Score	Rank
Norfolk Island men's	Men's	Niue; L 8-10	Fiji; L 4-8	Samoa; L 3-7	Cook Islands; D 4-4	Kiribati; W 9-1	Solomon Islands; W 7-6	Papua New Guinea; L 5-9	6	Did not qualify	Did not qualify	6

=== Men's tournament ===
Men's roster

- Reuben Bigg
- Shane Evans
- Kya Snell
- James Bigg
- Mark Kalsrap
- Nathaniel Kalsrap
- Ben Wieczorek
- Cameron Christian
- Jordan Bigg
- Carl Quintal
- Jesse Schmitz
- Winton Steven
- William Partridge
- Taj Quintal

== Outrigger canoeing ==
Norfolk Island was represented by one female paddler.

Women

- Ada Nebauer
