= Tennis at the 2023 Pacific Games – Team competition =

Tennis team competition at the 2023 Pacific Games
- Venue: National Tennis Center
- Dates: 17–21 November 2023
- Nations: 13

The team competition for Tennis at the 2023 Pacific Games took place at the Solomon Islands National Tennis Center in Honiara from 17 to 21 November 2023.

== Schedule ==
Date	17 November	18 November	20 November	21 November
Team competition	Pool matches	Pool matches	Pool matches	Semi-finals and Finals

== Men's team event ==
=== Group stage ===
Four groups were drawn for the men's event. With only thirteen teams entered, Groups A, B and C consists of 3 teams each while group D featured 4 teams. Each team played each other once with only the top ranked team of each group advancing through to the play-offs.

==== Group A ====
Pos.	Country	Ties	Matches	Sets	Sets %	Games	Games %
1	French Polynesia	2	5 - 0	10 - 0	100.0%	43 - 14	75.4%
2	Vanuatu	2	2 - 4	4 - 8	33.3%	27 - 42	39.1%
3	Northern Mariana Islands	2	1 - 4	2 - 8	20.0%	21 - 35	37.5%

==== Group B ====
Pos.	Country	Ties	Matches	Sets	Sets %	Games	Games %
1	Guam	2	5 - 0	10 - 2	83.3%	49 - 32	60.5%
2	Papua New Guinea	2	3 - 2	7 - 4	63.6%	37 - 22	62.7%
3	Tonga	2	0 - 6	1 - 12	7.7%	22 - 54	28.9%

==== Group C ====
Pos.	Country	Ties	Matches	Sets	Sets %	Games	Games %
1	Fiji	2	5 - 1	10 - 3	76.9%	49 - 31	61.3%
2	Samoa	2	3 - 3	6 - 6	50.0%	38 - 37	50.7%
3	Solomon Islands	2	1 - 5	3 - 10	23.1%	30 - 49	38.0%

==== Group D ====
Pos.	Country	Ties	Matches	Sets	Sets %	Games	Games %
1	New Caledonia	3	8 - 0	16 - 1	94.1%	67 - 21	76.1%
2	Tuvalu	3	5 - 3	11 - 7	61.1%	62 - 45	57.9%
3	Cook Islands	3	2 - 6	5 - 12	29.4%	34 - 57	37.4%
4	Nauru	3	1 - 7	2 - 14	12.5%	20 - 60	25.0%

== Women's team event ==
=== Group stage ===
Three groups were drawn for the women's event. With only ten teams entered, Groups A and B consists of 3 teams each while group C featured 4 teams. Each team played each other once with only the top ranked team of each group advancing through to the play-offs along with the highest ranked second-placed team combined.

==== Group A ====
Pos.	Country	Ties	Matches	Sets	Sets %	Games	Games %
1	Samoa	2	6 - 0	12 - 1	92.3%	58 - 32	64.4%
2	Guam	2	3 - 3	7 - 7	50.0%	47 - 43	52.2%
3	Cook Islands	2	0 - 6	1 - 12	7.7%	20 - 50	28.6%

==== Group B ====
Pos.	Country	Ties	Matches	Sets	Sets %	Games	Games %
1	Papua New Guinea	2	5 - 1	10 - 2	83.3%	44 - 15	74.6%
2	Tonga	2	4 - 2	8 - 4	66.7%	37 - 22	62.7%
3	Nauru	2	0 - 6	0 - 12	0.0%	4 - 48	7.7%

==== Group C ====
Pos.	Country	Ties	Matches	Sets	Sets %	Games	Games %
1	Solomon Islands	3	8 - 1	17 - 5	77.3%	87 - 46	65.4%
2	French Polynesia	3	6 - 3	14 - 8	63.6%	76 - 64	54.3%
3	Fiji	3	3 - 6	8 - 12	40.0%	49 - 62	44.1%
4	Vanuatu	3	1 - 8	2 - 16	11.1%	29 - 69	29.6%
