= Niue at the 2023 Pacific Games =

- Flag of Niue
- National federation: Niue Island Sports Commonwealth Games Association

19 November 2023 – 2 December 2023
- Competitors: 47 (19 men and 28 women) in 5 sports
- Flag bearer: Ramsi Edwards
- Officials: Sidney Lui (chef de mission)
- Medals Ranked 19th: Gold 1 Silver 0 Bronze 1 Total 2

Pacific Games appearances
- 1963; 1966–1975; 1979; 1983; 1987; 1991; 1995; 1999; 2003; 2007; 2011; 2015; 2019; 2023

Niue competed at the 2023 Pacific Games in Honiara from 19 November to 2 December 2023. This was Niue's tenth appearance at the Pacific Games, since first competing in 1979.

== Competitors ==
The following is the list of number of competitors in the Games

Sport	Men	Women	Total
Boxing	3	0	3
Netball	—N/a	12	12
Powerlifting	1	1	2
Touch rugby	14	14	28
Weightlifting	1	1	2
Total	19	28	47

== Boxing ==
Niue announced three boxers for the event.

Athlete	Event	Preliminary	Quarterfinals	Semifinals	Final	
Athlete	Event	Opposition Result	Opposition Result	Opposition Result	Opposition Result	Rank
Duken Tutakitoa-Williams	Men's 86 kg	Bye	Dominique Tunoa (TAH); W 5–0	Francis Junior Niusaru (SOL); W 5–0	Gabriel Dauphin (TAH); W 5–0	1st place, gold medalist(s)
De Niro Pao	Men's 67 kg	Josaia Veiqarav (FIJ); W 4–1	Raphael Dauphin (TAH); L 0–5	Did not advance		
Keanu Naden	Men's 86 kg	Kua Gunua Mua (PNG); L 0–5	Did not advance			

== Netball ==
Summary

Team	Event	Group stage					Semifinal	Final / BM / Cl.	
Team	Event	Opposition Result	Opposition Result	Opposition Result	Opposition Result	Rank	Opposition Result	Opposition Result	Rank
Norfolk Island	Women's tournament	Tonga; L 17-90	Cook Islands; L 18-72	Vanuatu; W 59-28	Papua New Guinea; L 24-90	4	Did not qualify	Did not qualify	7

Team roster

- Leilani Lui-Ikiua
- Rosena Charina Jackson
- Francine Falaniua Morris
- Jazelle Dilworth
- Jenessa Noble
- Rosalina Holamotu Tausi
- Tiana Ikinofo
- Florence Ngan Woo
- Khalais Tanevesi
- Shakayah Tanevesi
- Kiana Kifoto Jackson
- Riley Nothdurft

== Powerlifting ==
Men

- Samuel Singh

Women

- Maxine Edwards

== Touch rugby ==
Summary

Team	Event	Round-robin								Semifinal	Final	
Team	Event	Opposition Score	Opposition Score	Opposition Score	Opposition Score	Opposition Score	Opposition Score	Opposition Score	Rank	Opposition Score	Opposition Score	Rank
Niue men's	Men's	Norfolk Island; W 10-8	Kiribati; W 12-1	Solomon Islands; W 6-4	Papua New Guinea; L 1-5	Cook Islands; W 7-6	Fiji; W 8-5	Samoa; L 4-6	4	Papua New Guinea; L 2-3	Bronze medal match Fiji; L 5-2	4
Niue women's	Women's	Papua New Guinea –	Kiribati –	Samoa –	Cook Islands –	Fiji –	Solomon Islands –	—N/a				
Niue mixed	Mixed	Papua New Guinea –	Kiribati –	Samoa –	Cook Islands –	Fiji –	Solomon Islands –	—N/a				

=== Men's tournament ===
Men's roster

- Troy Harrison
- Tana Love-Hepi
- Ngakau Perry
- Patrick Moore-Lam
- Nathaniel Manase
- Torynn Atamu
- Joel Stowers
- Taimana Simi
- Riwhi Rex-George
- Honour Silimaka
- Jeremiah Makavilitogia
- Joshua Scully
- Tyrese Coromandel
- Heaven Silimaka

=== Women's tournament ===
Women's roster

- Brytten Reynolds
- Lisa Vaimalu
- Mariko Viliko Edwards
- Quilaine Papua
- Sheeniell Viliko
- Teri King
- Turiti Galiki
- Harmony Perry
- Truniqua Silimaka
- Tracey Palupe
- Peyton Holamotu
- Xanthe Vaimalu
- Jaimee Holamotutama
- Brooke Holamotutama

=== Mixed tournament ===
Mixed team roster

- Mixed team event – one team of 14 players from men's and women's squads

== Weightlifting ==
Athlete	Event	Snatch	Rank	Clean & jerk	Rank	Total	Rank
Callum Makatoa	Men's -109 kg						
Ramsi Edwards	Women's +87 kg						
