= Cook Islands at the 2023 Pacific Games =

- National federation: Cook Islands Sports and National Olympic Committee

19 November 2023 – 2 December 2023
- Competitors: 105 (48 men and 57 women) in 5 sports
- Flag bearers: Stephen Willis; Julieanne Westrupp
- Medals Ranked 11th: Gold 5 Silver 3 Bronze 10 Total 18

Pacific Games appearances
- 1963; 1966; 1969; 1971; 1975; 1979; 1983; 1987; 1991; 1995; 1999; 2003; 2007; 2011; 2015; 2019; 2023

Cook Islands competed at the 2023 Pacific Games in Honiara from 19 November to 2 December 2023.

== Competitors ==
The following is the list of number of competitors in the Games.

Sport	Men	Women	Total
Athletics	6	3	9
Basketball	4	16	20
Football	23	23	46
Touch rugby	14	14	28
Weightlifting	1	1	2
Total	48	57	105

== Athletics ==
Athletics Cook islands announced a team of 9 athletes in track and field on 21 September 2023. The team will feature Alex Beddoes who is the defending champion from Apia 2019 in the 800m and 1500m.

Key

- Note–Ranks given for track events are within the athlete's heat only
- Q = Qualified for the next round
- q = Qualified for the next round as a fastest loser or, in field events, by position without achieving the qualifying target
- qR = Qualified to the next round by referee judgement
- NR = National record
- N/A = Round not applicable for the event
- Bye = Athlete not required to compete in round

Track and field events
Men

Athlete	Event	Heat		Semifinal		Final	
Athlete	Event	Result	Rank	Result	Rank	Result	Rank
Daniel Tolosa	100 m						
Daniel Tolosa	200 m						
Alex Beddoes	800 m						
Alex Beddoes	1500 m						
Rupeni Mataitoga	800 m						
Rupeni Mataitoga	1500 m						
	4×100 m relay	—					
	4×400 m relay	—					
Piri Nga	Long jump						
Willynn Karika	Javelin throw						

Women

Athlete	Event	Heat		Final	
Athlete	Event	Result	Rank	Result	Rank
Estelle Short	Long jump				
Ana Ellison-Lupena	Discus throw				
Ana Ellison-Lupena	Hammer throw				
Tatiana Sherwin	Javelin throw				

Combined events – Men's decathlon

Athlete	Event	100 m	LJ	SP	HJ	400 m	110H	DT	PV	JT	1500 m	Final	Rank
Max Teuruaa	Result												
Max Teuruaa	Points												

== Basketball ==
Cook Islands qualified three teams for the pacific Games basketball tournament.

=== 5×5 basketball ===
Summary

Team	Event	Preliminary round				Qualifying finals	Semifinals	Final / GM	
Team	Event	Opposition Score	Opposition Score	Opposition Score	Rank	Opposition Score	Opposition Score	Opposition Score	Rank
Cook Islands Women's	Women's	New Caledonia –	Papua New Guinea –	Tahiti –					

==== Women's tournament ====
Cook Islands women's national basketball team qualified for the Pacific Games by securing one of two berths after winning gold at the 2022 FIBA Women's Polynesia Basketball Cup in Kaitaia, New Zealand.

Team roster

- Women's team event – one team of 12 players

=== 3×3 basketball ===
Summary

Team	Event	Pool play						Semifinals	Final / GM	
Team	Event	Opposition Score	Opposition Score	Opposition Score	Opposition Score	Opposition Score	Rank	Opposition Score	Opposition Score	Rank
Cook Islands men's	Men's tournament	Guam –	French Polynesia –	Palau –	Tonga –	Fiji –				
Cook Islands women's	Women's tournament	Samoa –	Fiji –	Solomon Islands –	Marshall Islands –	—				

==== Men's tournament ====
Team roster

- Men's team event – one team of 4 players

==== Women's tournament ====
Team roster

- Women's team event – one team of 4 players

== Football ==
Summary

Team	Event	Preliminary round					Final	
Team	Event	Opposition Score	Opposition Score	Opposition Score	Opposition Score	Rank	Opposition Score	Rank
Cook Islands men's	Men's tournament							
Cook Islands women's	Women's tournament							

=== Men's tournament ===
Team roster

- Men's team event – one team of 23 players

=== Women's tournament ===
Team roster

- Women's team event – one team of 23 players

== Touch rugby ==
Cook Islands touch rugby teams are scheduled to compete.

Summary

Team	Event	Round-robin								Semifinal	Final	
Team	Event	Opposition Score	Opposition Score	Opposition Score	Opposition Score	Opposition Score	Opposition Score	Opposition Score	Rank	Opposition Score	Opposition Score	Rank
Cook Islands men's	Men's	Solomon Islands –	Samoa –	Papua New Guinea –	Norfolk Island –	Niue –	Kiribati –	Fiji –				
Cook Islands women's	Women's	Solomon Islands –	Samoa –	Papua New Guinea –	Niue –	Kiribati –	Fiji –	—				
Cook Islands mixed	Mixed	Solomon Islands –	Samoa –	Papua New Guinea –	Niue –	Kiribati –	Fiji –	—				

=== Men's tournament ===
Team roster

- Men's team event – one team of 14 players

=== Women's tournament ===
Team roster

- Women's team event – one team of 14 players

=== Mixed tournament ===
Team roster

- Mixed team event – one team of 14 players from men's and women's rosters

== Weightlifting ==
CISNOC selected two weightlifters for the 2023 Games.

Athlete	Event	Snatch	Rank	Clean & jerk	Rank	Total	Rank
Jerome Tura	Men's –89 kg						
Tehei Napa	Women's –55 kg						
