= Touch rugby at the 2023 Pacific Games – Women's tournament =

Women's touch rugby at the 2023 Pacific Games
- Venue: DC Park
- Location: Honiara, Solomon Islands
- Dates: 27-29 November 2023
- Teams: 6

Medalists
gold medal	Samoa
silver medal	Papua New Guinea
bronze medal	Fiji

Women's touch rugby at the 2023 Pacific Games is scheduled for 27-29 November at DC Park in Honiara, Solomon Islands.

== Participating teams ==
Six Pacific Games Associations are scheduled to compete.

- Cook Islands (14)
- Fiji (14)
- Niue (14)
- Papua New Guinea (14)
- Samoa (14)
- Solomon Islands (14) (Host)

== Preliminary round ==
Pos	Team	Pld	W	D	L	PF	PA	PD	Pts	Qualification
1	Papua New Guinea	5	4	1	0	44	11	+33	14	Semi-final stage
2	Samoa	5	3	0	2	32	14	+18	11	Semi-final stage
3	Fiji	5	2	2	1	32	17	+15	11	Semi-final stage
4	Cook Islands	5	2	1	2	25	21	+4	10	Semi-final stage
5	Niue	5	2	0	3	19	28	−9	9	
6	Solomon Islands	5	0	0	5	2	63	−61	5	

Source: SOL23 and FIT

=== Day 1 ===
Round 1

27 November 2023
08:30

Kiribati	–	Samoa

DC Park, Field 2

27 November 2023
08:30

Niue	–	Papua New Guinea

DC Park, Field 1

27 November 2023
09:20

Fiji	–	Solomon Islands

DC Park, Field 1

Round 2

27 November 2023
11:00

Kiribati	–	Niue

DC Park, Field 2

27 November 2023
11:50

Fiji	–	Papua New Guinea

DC Park, Field 1

27 November 2023
11:50

Cook Islands	–	Solomon Islands

DC Park, Field 2

Round 3

27 November 2023
14:20

Solomon Islands	–	Papua New Guinea

DC Park, Field 2

27 November 2023
14:20

Cook Islands	–	Samoa

DC Park, Field 1

27 November 2023
15:10

Fiji	–	Kiribati

DC Park, Field 1

=== Day 2 ===
Round 4

27 November 2023
08:30

Samoa	–	Niue

DC Park, Field 2

27 November 2023
08:30

Solomon Islands	–	Kiribati

DC Park, Field 1

27 November 2023
09:20

Cook Islands	–	Papua New Guinea

DC Park, Field 1

Round 5

27 November 2023
11:00

Samoa	–	Fiji

DC Park, Field 2

27 November 2023
11:50

Cook Islands	–	Niue

DC Park, Field 2

27 November 2023
11:50

Papua New Guinea	–	Kiribati

DC Park, Field 1

Round 6

27 November 2023
14:20

Samoa	–	Solomon Islands

DC Park, Field 2

27 November 2023
14:20

Niue	–	Fiji

DC Park, Field 1

27 November 2023
15:10

Cook Islands	–	Kiribati

DC Park, Field 2

=== Day 3 ===
Round 7

27 November 2023
08:30

Niue	–	Solomon Islands

DC Park, Field 1

27 November 2023
08:30

Papua New Guinea	–	Samoa

DC Park, Field 2

27 November 2023
09:20

Cook Islands	–	Fiji

DC Park, Field 1

== Playoffs ==
Fifth place match

29 November 2023
14:20

Niue	6–1	Solomon Islands

DC Park, Field 1

== Finals ==
=== Semi-finals ===
29 November 2023
12:40

Samoa	6–2	Fiji

DC Park, Field 2

29 November 2023
11:00

Papua New Guinea	7–5	Cook Islands

DC Park, Field 1

=== Bronze medal match ===
29 November 2023
15:10

(bronze) Fiji	7–6	Cook Islands

DC Park, Field 1

=== Gold medal match ===
29 November 2023
15:10

(gold) Samoa	8–7	Papua New Guinea (silver)

DC Park, Field 2

== Final ranking ==
Rank	Team
1st place, gold medalist(s)	Samoa
2nd place, silver medalist(s)	Papua New Guinea
3rd place, bronze medalist(s)	Fiji
4	Cook Islands
5	Niue
6	Solomon Islands
