= Touch rugby at the 2023 Pacific Games – Men's tournament =

Men's touch rugby at the 2023 Pacific Games
- Venue: DC Park
- Location: Honiara, Solomon Islands
- Dates: 27-29 November 2023
- Teams: 8

Medalists
gold medal	Samoa
silver medal	Papua New Guinea
bronze medal	Fiji

Men's touch rugby at the 2023 Pacific Games is was held from the 27th to the 29th of November at DC Park in Honiara.

== Participating teams ==
Eight Pacific Games Associations are scheduled to compete.

- Cook Islands
- Fiji
- Kiribati
- Niue
- Norfolk Island
- Papua New Guinea
- Samoa
- Solomon Islands (Host)

== Preliminary round ==
Pos	Team	Pld	W	D	L	PF	PA	PD	Pts	Qualification
1	Papua New Guinea	7	6	1	0	57	16	+41	20	Knockout stage
2	Samoa	7	6	1	0	51	21	+30	20	Knockout stage
3	Fiji	7	5	0	2	50	28	+22	17	Knockout stage
4	Niue	7	4	0	3	45	38	+7	15	Knockout stage
5	Cook Islands	7	2	1	4	38	31	+7	12	
6	Norfolk Island	7	2	1	4	40	45	−5	12	
7	Solomon Islands	7	1	0	6	28	63	−35	9	
8	Kiribati	7	0	0	7	12	79	−67	7	

Source: SOL23 and FIT

=== Day 1 ===
Round 1

27 November 2023
09:20

Kiribati	2–18	Papua New Guinea

DC Park, Field 2

27 November 2023
10:10

Cook Islands	12–1	Solomon Islands

DC Park, Field 2

27 November 2023
10:10

Niue	10–8	Norfolk Island

DC Park, Field 1

27 November 2023
11:00

Fiji	5–8	Samoa

DC Park, Field 1

Round 2

27 November 2023
12:40

Kiribati	1–12	Niue

DC Park, Field 1

27 November 2023
12:40

Solomon Islands	2–14	Papua New Guinea

DC Park, Field 2

27 November 2023
13:30

Cook Islands	3–7	Samoa

DC Park, Field 1

27 November 2023
13:30

Fiji	8–4	Norfolk Island

DC Park, Field 2

Round 3

27 November 2023
15:10

Solomon Islands	4–6	Niue

DC Park, Field 2

27 November 2023
16:00

Cook Islands	2–6	Papua New Guinea

DC Park, Field 2

27 November 2023
16:00

Samoa	7–3	Norfolk Island

DC Park, Field 1

27 November 2023
16:50

Fiji	11–1	Kiribati

DC Park, Field 2

=== Day 2 ===
Round 4

28 November 2023
09:20

Cook Islands	4–4	Norfolk Island

DC Park, Field 2

28 November 2023
10:10

Fiji	12–5	Solomon Islands

DC Park, Field 1

28 November 2023
10:10

Kiribati	1–13	Samoa

DC Park, Field 2

28 November 2023
11:00

Niue	1–5	Papua New Guinea

DC Park, Field 1

Round 5

28 November 2023
12:40

Kiribati	1–9	Norfolk Island

DC Park, Field 1

28 November 2023
12:40

Samoa	8–3	Solomon Islands

DC Park, field 2

28 November 2023
13:30

Cook Islands	6–7	Niue

DC Park, Field 1

28 November 2023
13:30

Fiji	2–3	Papua New Guinea

DC Park, Field 2

Round 6

28 November 2023
15:10

Papua New Guinea	2–2	Samoa

DC Park, Field 1

28 November 2023
16:00

Fiji	8–5	Niue

DC Park, Field 2

28 November 2023
16:00

Cook Islands	9–2	Kiribati

DC Park, Field 1

28 November 2023
16:50

Norfolk Island	7–6	Solomon Islands

DC Park, Field 2

=== Day 3 ===
Round 7

29 November 2023
09:20

Cook Islands	2–4	Fiji

DC Park, Field 2

29 November 2023
10:10

Norfolk Island	5–9	Papua New Guinea

DC Park, Field 1

29 November 2023
10:10

Niue	4–6	Samoa

DC Park, Field 2

29 November 2023
11:00

Kiribati	4–7	Solomon Islands

DC Park, Field 1

== Playoffs ==
Seventh place match

29 November 2023
14:20

Solomon Islands	8–2	Kiribati

DC Park, Field 2

Fifth place match

29 November 2023
14:20

Cook Islands	6–3	Norfolk Island

DC Park, Field 1

== Finals ==
=== Semi-finals ===
29 November 2023
13:30

Papua New Guinea	3–2	Niue

DC Park, Field 1

29 November 2023
13:30

Samoa	8–5	Fiji

DC Park, Field 2

=== Bronze medal match ===
29 November 2023
16:00

(bronze) Fiji	5–2	Niue

DC Park, Field 2

=== Gold medal match ===
29 November 2023
16:00

(gold) Samoa	6–5	Papua New Guinea (silver)

DC Park, Field 1

== Final ranking ==
Rank	Team
1st place, gold medalist(s)	Samoa
2nd place, silver medalist(s)	Papua New Guinea
3rd place, bronze medalist(s)	Fiji
4	Niue
5	Cook Islands
6	Norfolk Island
7	Solomon Islands
8	Kiribati
