= Touch rugby at the 2023 Pacific Games – Mixed tournament =

Mixed touch rugby at the 2023 Pacific Games
- Venue: DC Park
- Location: Honiara, Solomon Islands
- Dates: 30 November – 2 December 2023
- Teams: 6

Medalists
| gold medal | Samoa |
| silver medal | Papua New Guinea |
| bronze medal | Fiji |

Mixed touch rugby at the 2023 Pacific Games is scheduled for 30 November-2 December at DC Park in Honiara.

== Participating teams ==
Six Pacific Games Associations are scheduled to compete.

- Cook Islands
- Fiji
- Niue
- Papua New Guinea
- Samoa
- Solomon Islands (Host)

== Preliminary round ==
| Pos | Team | Pld | W | D | L | PF | PA | PD | Pts | Qualification |
|---|---|---|---|---|---|---|---|---|---|---|
| 1 | Samoa | 5 | 4 | 0 | 1 | 41 | 28 | +13 | 13 | Semi-final stage |
| 2 | Papua New Guinea | 5 | 3 | 1 | 1 | 40 | 20 | +20 | 12 | Semi-final stage |
| 3 | Fiji | 5 | 2 | 2 | 1 | 33 | 32 | +1 | 11 | Semi-final stage |
| 4 | Cook Islands | 5 | 2 | 1 | 2 | 34 | 30 | +4 | 10 | Semi-final stage |
| 5 | Niue | 5 | 1 | 2 | 2 | 25 | 24 | +1 | 9 | |
| 6 | Solomon Islands | 5 | 0 | 0 | 5 | 14 | 53 | −39 | 5 | |

Source: SOL23 and FIT

=== Day 1 ===
Round 1

30 November 2023
08:30

| Fiji | – | Solomon Islands |

DC Park, Field 1

30 November 2023
08:30

| Kiribati | – | Samoa |

DC Park, Field 2

30 November 2023
09:20

| Niue | – | Papua New Guinea |

DC Park, Field 1

Round 2

30 November 2023
12:00

| Cook Islands | – | Solomon Islands |

DC Park, Field 1

30 November 2023
12:00

| Fiji | – | Papua New Guinea |

DC Park, Field 2

30 November 2023
12:50

| Kiribati | – | Niue |

DC Park, Field 2

Round 3

30 November 2023
14:20

| Cook Islands | – | Samoa |

DC Park, Field 1

30 November 2023
14:20

| Solomon Islands | – | Papua New Guinea |

DC Park, Field 2

30 November 2023
15:10

| Fiji | – | Kiribati |

DC Park, Field 1

=== Day 2 ===
Round 4

1 December 2023
08:30

| Cook Islands | – | Papua New Guinea |

DC Park, Field 1

1 December 2023
08:30

| Samoa | – | Niue |

DC Park, Field 2

1 December 2023
09:20

| Solomon Islands | – | Kiribati |

DC Park, Field 1

Round 5

1 December 2023
12:00

| Papua New Guinea | – | Kiribati |

DC Park, Field 2

1 December 2023
12:00

| Cook Islands | – | Niue |

DC Park, Field 1

1 December 2023
12:50

| Samoa | – | Fiji |

DC Park, Field 1

Round 6

1 December 2023
14:20

| Cook Islands | – | Kiribati |

DC Park, Field 1

1 December 2023
14:20

| Niue | – | Fiji |

DC Park, Field 2

1 December 2023
15:10

| Samoa | – | Solomon Islands |

DC Park, Field 1

=== Day 3 ===
Round 7

2 December 2023
08:30

| Niue | – | Solomon Islands |

DC Park, Field 1

2 December 2023
08:30

| Cook Islands | – | Fiji |

DC Park, Field 2

2 December 2023
09:20

| Papua New Guinea | – | Samoa |

DC Park, Field 1

== Playoffs ==
Fifth place match

2 December 2023
11:50

| Niue | 10–4 | Solomon Islands |

DC Park, Field 1

== Finals ==
=== Semi-finals ===
2 December 2023
9:20

| Papua New Guinea | 6–5 | Fiji |

DC Park, Field 1

2 December 2023
10:10

| Samoa | 11–4 | Cook Islands |

DC Park, Field 1

=== Bronze medal match ===
2 December 2023
14:20

| (bronze) Fiji | 12–5 | Cook Islands |

DC Park, Field 1

=== Gold medal match ===
2 December 2023
15:10

| (silver) Papua New Guinea | 6–7 | Samoa (gold) |

DC Park, Field 2

== Final ranking ==
| Rank | Team |
|---|---|
| 1st place, gold medalist(s) | Samoa |
| 2nd place, silver medalist(s) | Papua New Guinea |
| 3rd place, bronze medalist(s) | Fiji |
| 4 | Cook Islands |
| 5 | Niue |
| 6 | Solomon Islands |
