= Basketball at the 2023 Pacific Games =

- Basketball pictogram for the Games
- Venue: Friendship Hall (5x5); SIFF Academy (3x3)
- Dates: 17 November – 2 December 2023
- Competitors: 284 from 12 nations

Basketball was one of the 24 sports contested at the 2023 Pacific Games held in Honiara, Solomon Islands. The 5x5 format was played at the Friendship Hall from 17–25 November while the 3x3 format took place from 30 November to 2 December at the SIFF Academy.

The tournament also served as the qualification phase for FIBA Oceania to the 2029 FIBA Asia Cup pre-qualifiers.

== Medal summary ==
=== Medal table ===
Rank	NOC	Gold	Silver	Bronze	Total
1	Tahiti	2	0	0	2
2	Fiji	1	2	1	4
3	Guam	1	1	0	2
4	Cook Islands	0	1	1	2
5	New Caledonia	0	0	2	2
Totals (5 entries)		4	4	4	12

=== Events ===
Event	Gold	Silver	Bronze
Men	Fiji; Tyron McLennan; Marques Whippy; Filimone Waqabaca; Joshua Motufaga; Orisi Naivalurua; John Yee Chief; Joshua Fox; William Qounadovu; Keenan Hughes; Mataika Koyamainavure; Jordan Lum Kon; Isimeli Koroi	Guam; Reo Aiken; Ben Borja II; Eduardo Calvo; Daniel Del Carmen; Jonathan Galloway; Aljurrell Grape; Alschea Grape; Mark Johnson Junior; Gabriel Simon; Mekeli Wesley; Tai Wesley; Jahmar White	New Caledonia; Rodrigue Tetainanuari; Jean-Sebastien Chevrin; Raymond Weber; Beniela Adjouhgniope; Ethaniel Fenuafanote; Ludovic Mitrail; Paul Boawe; Flo Patche; Edouard Esneu; Solomon Puleoto; Luther Puleoto; Cedric Tetuanui
Women	Tahiti; Oceane Lefranc; Herehau Teissier; Mahinetea Tavanae; Alizee Lefranc; Hauhere Ching-Bellais; Moina Tuieinui-Le Beherec; Maea Lextreyt; Hereiti Viriamu; Mathilde Bayle; Poehei Teissier; Temana Teururai; Romy Aitamai	Cook Islands; Tikara Jallow; Jordina Katu; Keziah Lewis; Grace Neilson; Ajiah Pepe; Dalen Pilitati; Zarya Poulava; Terai Sadler; Te Araroa Sopoanga; Elianna Tuaiti	Fiji; Letava Whippy-Kenny; Kayla Mendez; Bulou Tuisue; Delores King; Mili Koyamainavure; Ranadi Koroi; Estelle Kainamoli; Salome Masivou; Berenadeta Nauqe; Moana Liebregts; Ella Koroi; Matila Vocea
Men 3×3	Guam; Reo Aiken; Ben Borja II; Mark Johnson Junior; Michael Sakazaki	Fiji; Filimone Waqabaca; Joshua Motufaga; Joshua Fox; Keenan Hughes	New Caledonia; Jules Cassaigne; Joan Delaunay-Belleville; Jocelyn Lissarrague; Rovan Williams
Women 3×3	Tahiti; Prisca Allaguy-Salachy; Hauhere Ching-Bellais; Moina Tuieinui-Le Beherec; Mathilde Bayle	Fiji; Ranadi Koroi; Estelle Kainamoli; Moana Liebregts; Matila Vocea	Cook Islands; Tikara Jallow; Keziah Lewis; Ajiah Pepe; Elianna Tuaiti

== Qualification summary ==
The following teams are confirmed for this edition's basketball tournament for both men and women, following the conclusion of regional events and wildcard selection. The New Caledonian women's 5×5 team were originally wildcard entries for the games, however, following a decision by the Territorial Olympic and Sports Committee (CTOS) of New Caledonia the team was withdrawn from the games on 22 July 2023. Tonga, as the next alternate, were then awarded the wildcard.

PGA	Men		Women		Total
PGA	5×5	3×3	5×5	3×3	Athletes
American Samoa		Yes			4
Cook Islands		Yes	Yes	Yes	20
Fiji	Yes	Yes	Yes	Yes	32
Guam	Yes	Yes	Yes	Yes	32
Kiribati		No			
Marshall Islands		Yes		Yes	8
New Caledonia	Yes	Yes	No	Yes	20
Palau		Yes			4
Papua New Guinea	Yes	Yes	Yes	Yes	32
Samoa	Yes	Yes	Yes	Yes	32
Solomon Islands	Yes	Yes	Yes	Yes	32
Tahiti	Yes	Yes	Yes	Yes	32
Tonga	Yes	Yes	Yes	Yes	32
Total: 12 PGAs	8	12	8	10	280

== Competition schedule ==
G	Group stage	Q	Qualifying finals	C	Classification	¼	Quarterfinals	½	Semifinals	F	Finals

Event↓/Date →	17th Fri	18th Sat	19th Sun	20th Mon	21st Tue	22nd Wed	23rd Thu	24th Fri	25th Sat	29th Wed	30th Thu	1st Fri	2nd Sat	
Basketball
Men	G	G	G	G	G	Q	C	½	F					
Women	G	G	G	G	G	Q	C	½	F					
3x3 basketball
Men										G	G	G	½	F
Women										G	G	G	½	F

== 5×5 basketball ==
=== Qualification ===
The Pacific Games Associations may enter one 12-player men's team and/or one 12-player women's team.

Men's qualification

Qualification method	Date	Berths	Qualified teams
Host nation	11 May 2016	1	Solomon Islands
2022 FIBA Micronesian Cup	8−11 June 2022	1	Guam
2022 FIBA Melanesian Cup	26−29 October 2022	2	New Caledonia; Papua New Guinea
2022 FIBA Polynesian Cup	1−5 November 2022	2	(French Polynesia) Tahiti; Tonga
Wildcards	16 December 2022	2	Fiji; Samoa
Total		8	

Women's qualification

Qualification method	Date	Berths	Qualified teams
Host nation	11 May 2016	1	Solomon Islands
2022 FIBA Women's Micronesian Cup	8−11 June 2022	1	Guam
2022 FIBA Women's Melanesian Cup	26−29 October 2022	2	Fiji; Papua New Guinea
2022 FIBA Women's Polynesian Cup	1−5 November 2022	2	Cook Islands; Samoa
Wildcards	16 December 2022	2	~~New Caledonia~~ (Note: The Territorial Olympic and Sports Committee of New Caledonia withdrew their women's 5×5 team citing the team's lack of competitiveness.) (French Polynesia) Tahiti; Tonga (Note: Tongan women's 5×5 team became the eighth team following New Caledonia's withdrawal.)
Total		8	
