= Tennis at the 2023 Pacific Games – Men's doubles =

Men's doubles at the 2023 Pacific Games
- Venue: National Tennis Center
- Dates: 24–30 November

Medalists
| gold medal | Charles Cornish; William O'Connell | Fiji |
| silver medal | Faolina Haleti; Maka Ofati | Tuvalu |
| bronze medal | Camden Camacho; Daniel Llarenas | Guam |

The men's doubles tennis event at the 2023 Pacific Games took place at the National Tennis Center in Honiara, Solomon Islands from 24 to 30 November 2023.

== Schedule ==
| Date | 24 November | 25 November | 26 November | 27 November | 28 November | 29 November | 30 November |
|---|---|---|---|---|---|---|---|
| Men's doubles | Round of 32 | Round of 16 | Rest day | Quarterfinals | Semifinals | | Finals |

== Seeds ==
All seeds per ATP rankings.

1. (Guam) Camden Camacho / (Guam) Daniel Llarenas (semifinals)
2. (French Polynesia) Reynald Taaroa / (French Polynesia) Antoine Voisin (quarterfinals)
3. (Papua New Guinea) Mark Gibbons / (Papua New Guinea) Matthew Stubbings (quarterfinals)
4. (Fiji) Charles Cornish / (Fiji) William O'Connell (champions, gold medalists)
5. (New Caledonia) Heremana Courte / (New Caledonia) Nell Rollin (semifinals)
6. (French Polynesia) Heve Kelley / (French Polynesia) Heimanarii Laisan (quarterfinals)
7. (Samoa) Leon Soonalole / (Samoa) Marvin Soonalole (quarterfinals)
8. (Tuvalu) Faolina Haleti / (Tuvalu) Maka Ofati (finals, silver medalists)

== Draw ==
=== Finals ===
Semi-finals
1 | (Guam) Camden Camacho (Guam) Daniel Llarenas | 4 | 6 | 6
4 | (Fiji) Charles Cornish (Fiji) William O'Connell | 6 | 1 | 10
5 | (New Caledonia) Heremana Courte (New Caledonia) Nell Rollin | 6^{1} | 6 | 8
8 | (Tuvalu) Faolina Haleti (Tuvalu) Maka Ofati | 7^{7} | 4 | 10

Final
4 | (Fiji) Charles Cornish (Fiji) William O'Connell | 7 | 6
8 | (Tuvalu) Faolina Haleti (Tuvalu) Maka Ofati | 5 | 2
Bronze medal
1 | (Guam) Camden Camacho (Guam) Daniel Llarenas | 6 | 6
5 | (New Caledonia) Heremana Courte (New Caledonia) Nell Rollin | 3 | 3

=== Top half ===
==== Section 1 ====
Round of 32
(Solomon Islands) Lachlan Guba (Solomon Islands) Pyongil Justus | 6 | 6
(Nauru) Addi Dallas (Nauru) Scotty Mikio | 1 | 4

Round of 16
1 | (Guam) Camden Camacho (Guam) Daniel Llarenas | 6 | 6
(Solomon Islands) Lachlan Guba (Solomon Islands) Pyongil Justus | 1 | 2
(Papua New Guinea) Christopher Kaiuolo (Papua New Guinea) Eddie Mera | 2 | 1
6 | (French Polynesia) Heve Kelley (French Polynesia) Heimanarii Laisan | 6 | 6

Quarter-finals
1 | (Guam) Camden Camacho (Guam) Daniel Llarenas | 6 | 7^{7}
6 | (French Polynesia) Heve Kelley (French Polynesia) Heimanarii Laisan | 2 | 6^{2}

==== Section 2 ====
Round of 32
(Vanuatu) Fintan Molbaleh (Vanuatu) Zachary Sands | 6 | 7
(Tuvalu) Felo Feoto (Tuvalu) Mathew Pese | 1 | 5
(Northern Mariana Islands) Colin Ramsey (Northern Mariana Islands) Moris Villanueva | 6^{4} | 6 | 7
(Tonga) Filipe Huni (Tonga) Otufangavalu Noa | 7^{7} | 0 | 10

Round of 16
4 | (Fiji) Charles Cornish (Fiji) William O'Connell | 6 | 6
(Vanuatu) Fintan Molbaleh (Vanuatu) Zachary Sands | 3 | 0
(Tonga) Filipe Huni (Tonga) Otufangavalu Noa | 2 | 0^{r}
7 | (Samoa) Leon Soonalole (Samoa) Marvin Soonalole | 6 | 0

Quarter-finals
4 | (Fiji) Charles Cornish (Fiji) William O'Connell | 7 | 6
7 | (Samoa) Leon Soonalole (Samoa) Marvin Soonalole | 5 | 3

=== Bottom-half ===
==== Section 3 ====
Round of 32
(Solomon Islands) Junior Michael Miki (Solomon Islands) Samuel Ramoni | 6 | 6
(Samoa) Darius Carruthers (Samoa) Faafetai Pritchard | 2 | 1
(Fiji) Amit Lal (Fiji) Raynal Singh | 6 | 3 | 11
(Cook Islands) Sebastian Payne (Cook Islands) Jason Pierre | 3 | 6 | 13

Round of 16
5 | (New Caledonia) Heremana Courte (New Caledonia) Nell Rollin | 6 | 6
(Solomon Islands) Junior Michael Miki (Solomon Islands) Samuel Ramoni | 2 | 2
(Cook Islands) Sebastian Payne (Cook Islands) Jason Pierre | 2 | 2
3 | (Papua New Guinea) Mark Gibbons (Papua New Guinea) Matthew Stubbings | 6 | 6

Quarter-finals
5 | (New Caledonia) Heremana Courte (New Caledonia) Nell Rollin | 6^{6} | 6 | 11
3 | (Papua New Guinea) Mark Gibbons (Papua New Guinea) Matthew Stubbings | 7^{8} | 3 | 9

==== Section 4 ====
Round of 32
(Vanuatu) Jean Andre (Vanuatu) Roberto Wong | 1 | 3
(Guam) Mason Caldwell (Guam) Aarman Sachdev | 6 | 6
(Tonga) Teufolau Huni (Tonga) Filimone Junior Noa | 7^{7} | 4 | 7
(Northern Mariana Islands) Nason Wessel (Northern Mariana Islands) June Yu | 6^{5} | 6 | 10

Round of 16
8 | (Tuvalu) Faolina Haleti (Tuvalu) Maka Ofati | 6 | 6
(Guam) Mason Caldwell (Guam) Aarman Sachdev | 4 | 0
(Northern Mariana Islands) Nason Wessel (Northern Mariana Islands) June Yu | 1 | 0
2 | (French Polynesia) Reynald Taaroa (French Polynesia) Antoine Voisin | 6 | 6

Quarter-finals
8 | (Tuvalu) Faolina Haleti (Tuvalu) Maka Ofati | 3 | 6 | 10
2 | (French Polynesia) Reynald Taaroa (French Polynesia) Antoine Voisin | 6 | 4 | 8
