= Tennis at the 2023 Pacific Games – Women's doubles =

Men's doubles at the 2023 Pacific Games
- Venue: National Tennis Center
- Dates: 24–30 November

Medalists
gold medal	Annerly Georgopoulos; Eleanor Schuster	Samoa
silver medal	Zorika Morgan; Georgimah Row	Solomon Islands
bronze medal	Ruby Coffin; Tarani Kamoe	Fiji

The women's doubles tennis event at the 2023 Pacific Games took place at the National Tennis Center in Honiara, Solomon Islands from 24 to 30 November 2023.

== Schedule ==
Date	24 November	25 November	26 November	27 November	28 November	29 November	30 November
Women's doubles	Round of 16		Rest day	Quarterfinals	Semifinals		Finals

== Seeds ==
All seeds per ATP rankings.

1. (Samoa) Annerly Georgopoulos / (Samoa) Eleanor Schuster (champions, gold medalists)
2. (Solomon Islands) Zorika Morgan / (Solomon Islands) Georgimah Row (finals, silver medalists)
3. (French Polynesia) Mehitia Boosie / (French Polynesia) Tavero Chung (semifinals, fourth place)
4. (Tonga) Sisilia Teu / (Tonga) Ela Vakaukamea (quarterfinals)

== Draw ==
First round
(Solomon Islands) Vinda Teally (Solomon Islands) Philia Waita	6	6
(Papua New Guinea) Michaela Mesa (Papua New Guinea) Namet Sanewai	1	2
3	(French Polynesia) Mehitia Boosie (French Polynesia) Tavero Chung	6	6
(Fiji) Josephine Debalevu (Fiji) Sina Izumi	3	4
(Cook Islands) Hinano Ellingham (Cook Islands) Katee Wearing	3	2
(Vanuatu) Lorraine Banimataku (Vanuatu) Abygail Coeuillet	6	6
(Nauru) Tsitsi Edwinkalin (Nauru) Itaia Nigelita	0	0
(Fiji) Ruby Coffin (Fiji) Tarani Kamoe	6	6
(French Polynesia) Mia Shan (French Polynesia) Jennifer Ly	0	2
4	(Tonga) Sisilia Teu (Tonga) Ela Vakaukamea	6	6
(Samoa) Noelleda Ah San (Samoa) Mahinarangi Warren	6^{11}	3
(Guam) Freemont Gibson (Guam) Sydney Packbier	7^{13}	6
(Cook Islands) Norah Browne (Cook Islands) Lilian Maui	2	2
2	(Solomon Islands) Zorika Morgan (Solomon Islands) Georgimah Row	6	6

Quarterfinals
1	(Samoa) Annerly Georgopoulos (Samoa) Eleanor Schuster	6	6
(Solomon Islands) Vinda Teally (Solomon Islands) Philia Waita	0	0
3	(French Polynesia) Mehitia Boosie (French Polynesia) Tavero Chung	6	6
(Vanuatu) Lorraine Banimataku (Vanuatu) Abygail Coeuillet	4	0
(Fiji) Ruby Coffin (Fiji) Tarani Kamoe	6	6
4	(Tonga) Sisilia Teu (Tonga) Ela Vakaukamea	3	3
(Guam) Freemont Gibson (Guam) Sydney Packbier	3	4
2	(Solomon Islands) Zorika Morgan (Solomon Islands) Georgimah Row	6	6

Semifinals
1	(Samoa) Annerly Georgopoulos (Samoa) Eleanor Schuster	6	6
3	(French Polynesia) Mehitia Boosie (French Polynesia) Tavero Chung	2	2
(Fiji) Ruby Coffin (Fiji) Tarani Kamoe	1	5
2	(Solomon Islands) Zorika Morgan (Solomon Islands) Georgimah Row	6	7

Final
1	(Samoa) Annerly Georgopoulos (Samoa) Eleanor Schuster	6	6
2	(Solomon Islands) Zorika Morgan (Solomon Islands) Georgimah Row	2	4
Bronze medal
3	(French Polynesia) Mehitia Boosie (French Polynesia) Tavero Chung	5	1
(Fiji) Ruby Coffin (Fiji) Tarani Kamoe	7	6
