= Tennis at the 2023 Pacific Games – Men's singles =

Men's singles at the 2023 Pacific Games
- Venue: National Tennis Center
- Dates: 22–30 November
- Competitors: 48 from 13 nations

Medalists
gold medal	Heremana Courte	New Caledonia
silver medal	Heve Kelley	Tahiti
bronze medal	Matthew Stubbings	Papua New Guinea

The men's singles tennis event at the 2023 Pacific Games took place at the National Tennis Center in Honiara, Solomon Islands from 22 to 30 November 2023.

== Schedule ==
Date	22 November	23 November	24 November	25 November	26 November	27 November	28 November	29 November	30 November
Men's singles	Round of 64	Round of 32		Round of 16	Rest day	Quarterfinals		Semifinals	Finals

== Seeds ==
All seeds per ATP rankings.

1. (New Caledonia) Heremana Courte (champion, gold medalist)
2. (French Polynesia) Heve Kelley (finals, silver medalist)
3. (Guam) Camden Camacho (semifinals, fourth place)
4. (Papua New Guinea) Matthew Stubbings (semifinals, bronze medalist)
5. (Guam) Daniel Llarenas (second round)
6. (French Polynesia) Reynald Taaroa (quarterfinals)
7. (New Caledonia) Louam Boivin (third round)
8. (Fiji) Charles Cornish (quarterfinals)
9. (French Polynesia) Antoine Voisin (quarterfinals)
10. (French Polynesia) Heimanarii Laisan (quarterfinals)
11. (Samoa) Leon Soonalole (third round)
12. (Samoa) Marvin Soonalole (second round, retired)
13. (Guam) Mason Caldwell (second round)
14. (Tuvalu) Maka Foster Ofati (third round)
15. (Vanuatu) Zachary Sands (third round)
16. (Solomon Islands) Junior Michael Miki (third round)

== Draw ==
=== Finals ===
Quarterfinals
1	(New Caledonia) Heremana Courte	6	6
6	(French Polynesia) Reynald Taaroa	2	4
4	(Papua New Guinea) Matthew Stubbings	5	6	6
10	(French Polynesia) Heimanarii Laisan	7	3	3
9	(French Polynesia) Antoine Voisin	3	0
3	(Guam) Camden Camacho	6	6
8	(Fiji) Charles Cornish	1	5
2	(French Polynesia) Heve Kelley	6	7

Semifinals
1	(New Caledonia) Heremana Courte	6	6
4	(Papua New Guinea) Matthew Stubbings	1	2
3	(Guam) Camden Camacho	2	3
2	(French Polynesia) Heve Kelley	6	6

Final
1	(New Caledonia) Heremana Courte	6	6
2	(French Polynesia) Heve Kelley	1	2
Bronze medal
4	(Papua New Guinea) Matthew Stubbings	6	6
3	(Guam) Camden Camacho	2	3

=== Top-half ===
==== Section 1 ====
First Round			Second Round				Third Round
			1	(New Caledonia) H Courte	6	6
(Tuvalu) F Haleti	1	1		(Solomon Islands) S Ramoni	1	1
(Solomon Islands) S Ramoni	6	6					1	(New Caledonia) H Courte	6	6
							15	(Vanuatu) Z Sands	0	1
				(Cook Islands) J Pierre	0	0^{r}
			15	(Vanuatu) Z Sands	6	2

==== Section 2 ====
First Round			Second Round				Third Round
			12	(Samoa) M Soonalole	6	0^{r}
(Nauru) A Dallas	2	2		(Northern Mariana Islands) M Villanueva	1	1
(Northern Mariana Islands) M Villanueva	6	6						(Northern Mariana Islands) M Villanueva	2	0
(Tonga) F Huni	1	3					6	(French Polynesia) R Taaroa	6	6
(Guam) A Sachdev	6	6		(Guam) A Sachdev	0	2
			6	(French Polynesia) R Taaroa	6	6

==== Section 3 ====
First Round				Second Round				Third Round
				4	(Papua New Guinea) Matthew Stubbings	6	6
(Northern Mariana Islands) N Wessel	2	6	3		(Vanuatu) J Andre	0	1
(Vanuatu) J Andre	6	4	6					4	(Papua New Guinea) M Stubbings	6	6
(Samoa) F Pritchard	6	6						16	(Solomon Islands) Jnr Miki	2	2
(Tonga) F Jnr Noa	2	2			(Samoa) F Pritchard	3	3
				16	(Solomon Islands) Jnr Miki	6	6

==== Section 4 ====
First Round			Second Round				Third Round
			10	(French Polynesia) H Laisan	6	7^{7}
(Fiji) R Singh	6	6		(Fiji) R Singh	0	6^{3}
(Nauru) S Mikio	2	0					10	(French Polynesia) H Laisan	7^{7}	6
(Tuvalu) M Pese	6	6						(Tuvalu) M Pese	6^{4}	3
(Cook Islands) S Payne	2	2		(Tuvalu) M Pese	6	6
			5	(Guam) D Llarenas	3	4

=== Bottom-half ===
==== Section 5 ====
First Round			Second Round				Third Round
			7	(New Caledonia) L Boivin	6	6
(Vanuatu) R Wong	6	6		(Vanuatu) R Wong	0	3
(Fiji) A Lal	0	2					7	(New Caledonia) L Boivin	6	6^{4}	3
(Solomon Islands) L Guba	6	6					9	(French Polynesia) A Voisin	0	7^{7}	6
(Cook Islands) L Pierre	0	2		(Solomon Islands) L Guba	1	0
			9	(French Polynesia) A Voisin	6	6

==== Section 6 ====
First Round				Second Round				Third Round
				14	(Tuvalu) M Ofati	6	6
(Samoa) D Carruthers	1	7	2		(Papua New Guinea) E Mera	3	2
(Papua New Guinea) E Mera	6	5	6					14	(Tuvalu) M Ofati	4	5
(Northern Mariana Islands) C Ramsey	6	6						3	(Guam) C Camacho	6	7
(Tonga) O Noa	4	1			(Northern Mariana Islands) C Ramsey	1	3
				3	(Guam) C Camacho	6	6

==== Section 7 ====
First Round				Second Round				Third Round
				8	(Fiji) C Cornish	6	6
(Nauru) N Kanano	4	6	2		(Tonga) T Huni	2	0
(Tonga) T Huni	6	2	6					8	(Fiji) C Cornish	3	6	7^{7}
(Tuvalu) F Feoto	1	4						11	(Samoa) L Soonalole	6	2	6^{3}
(Northern Mariana Islands) J Yu	6	6			(Northern Mariana Islands) J Yu	1	3
				11	(Samoa) L Soonalole	6	6

==== Section 8 ====
First Round			Second Round				Third Round
			13	(Guam) M Caldwell	3	4
(Vanuatu) F Molbaleh	2	2		(New Caledonia) N Rollin	6	6
(New Caledonia) N Rollin	6	6						(New Caledonia) N Rollin	6^{3}	2
(Papua New Guinea) C Kaiuolo	1	0					2	(French Polynesia) H Kelley	7^{7}	6
(Solomon Islands) P Justus	6	6		(Solomon Islands) P Justus	1	1
			2	(French Polynesia) H Kelley	6	6
