= Basketball at the 2023 Pacific Games – Men's 3×3 tournament =

Tournament details
- Host country: Solomon Islands
- City: Honiara
- Dates: 29 November – 2 December 2023
- Teams: 12 (from 1 confederation)
- Venue: SIFF Academy

The 2023 Pacific Games men's 3x3 basketball tournament in Honiara, will begin on 29 November and end on 2 December 2023. All games were played at the SIFF Academy.

== Format ==
The twelve teams were split into two pools of six, with a single round-robin being held within each pool. The top two teams of each pool advanced straight into the semifinals. After the preliminary round, the teams were matched according to their results with the finals featuring only four teams (top two of each pool).

== Schedule ==
The schedule of the tournament is as follows.

G	Group stage	½	Semifinals	F	Finals

Event↓/Date →	29th Wed	30th Thu	1st Fri	2nd Sat	
Men	G	G	G	½	F

== Players ==
Team	Players				Head Coach
American Samoa	Esene Alaia Jr.	Virgil Burton	Jeremiah Tuimaseve	Clayton Yuen	
Cook Islands	Te Rokurangi Bluegum	Brendon Heath	Finn Strickland	Peter Teiti	
Fiji					
Guam	Reo Aiken	Ben Borja II	Mark Johnson	Michael Sakazaki	
Marshall Islands	Malachi Aneo	Cyrus Graham	Halber Peter Pinho	Jeff Wase	
New Caledonia	Jules Cassaigne	Joan Delaunay-Belleville	Ahau Fenuafanote	Jocelyn Lissarrague	
Palau	Denzel Gabriel	Jerry Ngiraremiang	Salomon Ucherbelau	Wallace Worswick	
Papua New Guinea	Jabez Geita	Tony Haro	Sibona Kala	Moses Lune	Nick Daroa
Samoa					
Solomon Islands					
French Polynesia					
Tonga					

== Pool stage ==
=== Pool A ===
Pos	Team	Pld	W	L	PF	PA	PD	Qualification
1	New Caledonia	5	5	0	101	39	+62	Semifinals
2	Papua New Guinea	5	4	1	83	71	+12	Semifinals
3	American Samoa	5	3	2	77	76	+1	
4	Samoa	5	2	3	65	85	−20	
5	Marshall Islands	5	1	4	74	87	−13	
6	Solomon Islands (H)	5	0	5	60	102	−42	

Updated to match(es) played on 7 November 2023. Source: FIBA
Rules for classification: 1) Wins; 2) Head-to-head record; 3) Points scored.
(H) Hosts

All times are local (GMT+11).

=== Pool B ===
Pos	Team	Pld	W	L	PF	PA	PD	Qualification
1	Fiji	0	0	0	0	0	0	Semifinals
2	Guam	0	0	0	0	0	0	Semifinals
3	Cook Islands	0	0	0	0	0	0	
4	Palau	0	0	0	0	0	0	
5	Tonga	0	0	0	0	0	0	
6	French Polynesia	0	0	0	0	0	0	

Updated to match(es) played on 7 November 2023. Source: FIBA
Rules for classification: 1) Wins; 2) Head-to-head record; 3) Points scored.

All times are local (GMT+11).

== Final Stage ==
Semi-finals
1A	Fiji	18
2B	New Caledonia	14
1B	Guam	21
2A	Papua New Guinea	4

Final
1A	Fiji	18
1B	Guam	19
Third Place
2B	New Caledonia	21
2A	Papua New Guinea	5
