= Basketball at the 2023 Pacific Games – Women's 3×3 tournament =

Tournament details
- Host country: Solomon Islands
- City: Honiara
- Dates: 29 November – 2 December 2023
- Teams: 10 (from 1 confederation)
- Venue(s): SIFF Academy

The 2023 Pacific Games women's 3x3 basketball tournament in Honiara, will begin on 29 November and end on 2 December 2023. All games were played at the SIFF Academy.

== Format ==
The ten teams were split into two pools of five, with a single round-robin being held within each pool. The top two teams of each pool advanced straight into the semifinals. After the preliminary round, the teams were matched according to their results with the finals featuring only four teams (top two of each pool).

== Schedule ==
The schedule of the tournament is as follows.

G	Group stage	½	Semifinals	F	Finals

Event↓/Date →	29th Wed	30th Thu	1st Fri	2nd Sat	
Women	G	G	G	½	F

== Players ==
Team	Players				Head Coach
Cook Islands					
Fiji					
Guam	Kailie Celo	Alura Hernandez	Joylyn Pangilinan	Janniliese Quintanilla	
Marshall Islands					
New Caledonia	Enola An Ah Tchung	Loann Fisiipeau	Adeline Souque	Evalina Tartas	
Papua New Guinea	Betty Angula	Hannah Kuwimb	Ronnie Pomat	Nester Sape	Nick Daroa
Samoa					
Solomon Islands					
French Polynesia	Mathilde Bayle	Hauhere Ching-Bellais	Mahinetea Tavanae	Moïna Le Beherec	
Tonga					

== Pool stage ==
=== Pool A ===
Pos	Team	Pld	W	L	PF	PA	PD	Qualification
1	French Polynesia	2	2	0	39	24	+15	Semifinals
2	New Caledonia	2	2	0	34	24	+10	Semifinals
3	Tonga	2	1	1	25	25	0	
4	Papua New Guinea	3	1	2	39	48	−9	
5	Guam	3	0	3	41	57	−16	

Updated to match(es) played on 7 November 2023. Source: FIBA
Rules for classification: 1) Wins; 2) Head-to-head record; 3) Points scored.

All times are local (GMT+11).

29 November 2023
14:50

Papua New Guinea	18–14	Guam

Friendship Hall, Honiara

29 November 2023
15:15

New Caledonia	13–12	Tonga

Friendship Hall, Honiara

29 November 2023
18:05

New Caledonia	21–12	Guam

Friendship Hall, Honiara

29 November 2023
18:30

French Polynesia	21–9	Papua New Guinea

Friendship Hall, Honiara

30 November 2023
15:40

Tonga	13–12	Papua New Guinea

Friendship Hall, Honiara

30 November 2023
16:05

Guam	15–18	French Polynesia

Friendship Hall, Honiara

=== Pool B ===
Pos	Team	Pld	W	L	PF	PA	PD	Qualification
1	Cook Islands	2	2	0	43	9	+34	Semifinals
2	Fiji	3	2	1	39	33	+6	Semifinals
3	Marshall Islands	2	1	1	19	31	−12	
4	Solomon Islands (H)	2	1	1	29	25	+4	
5	Samoa	3	0	3	21	53	−32	

Updated to match(es) played on 7 November 2023. Source: FIBA
Rules for classification: 1) Wins; 2) Head-to-head record; 3) Points scored.
(H) Hosts

All times are local (GMT+11).

29 November 2023
15:40

Fiji	15–8	Samoa

Friendship Hall, Honiara

29 November 2023
14:50

Solomon Islands	14–15	Marshall Islands

Friendship Hall, Honiara

30 November 2023
14:50

Samoa	3–22	Cook Islands

Friendship Hall, Honiara

30 November 2023
15:15

Marshall Islands	4–17	Fiji

Friendship Hall, Honiara

30 November 2023
19:20

Samoa	10–15	Solomon Islands

Friendship Hall, Honiara

30 November 2023
19:45

Cook Islands	21–6	Fiji

Friendship Hall, Honiara
