= Guam men's national 3x3 team =

National 3x3 basketball team

Guam
- FIBA zone: FIBA Oceania

FIBA 3x3 World Championships
- Appearances: 1 (2012)
- Medals: None

Oceanian Championships
- Appearances: None

The Guam men's national 3x3 team is a national 3x3 basketball team of Guam, administered by the Guam Basketball Confederation.

== Tournament record ==
=== Asian Indoor and Martial Arts Games ===
- 2017 (Turkmenistan) – 13th

== See also ==
- Guam national basketball team
