= Touch rugby at the 2023 Pacific Games =

- Touch rugby pictogram for the Games
- Venue: DC Park
- Location: Honiara, Solomon Islands
- Dates: 27 November–2 December 2023
- Teams: 8

Touch rugby at the 2023 Pacific Games will held on 27 November–2 December at DC Park in Honiara.

== Participating teams ==
Eight Pacific Games Associations are scheduled to compete.

- Cook Islands
- Fiji
- Kiribati
- Niue
- Norfolk Island
- Papua New Guinea
- Samoa
- Solomon Islands (Host)

== Medal summary ==
=== Medal table ===
* Host nation (Solomon Islands)

Rank	Nation	Gold	Silver	Bronze	Total
1	Samoa	3	0	0	3
2	Papua New Guinea	0	3	0	3
3	Fiji	0	0	3	3
Totals (3 entries)		3	3	3	9

=== Results ===
Event	Gold	Silver	Bronze
Men	Samoa: Arran Rogers; Ryder Ah Fook; Michael Rasmussen; George Komiti; Dennis Maresa; Jesse Leituvae; Tyreese Sialapae; Stuart Toleafoa; Eteuati Togiatoamai; Dominic Afamasaga; Tapelu Tunufai; Ralphen Viane; Thomas Moors; Uelese Eteuati	Papua New Guinea: David Aruha; Casper Berry; Eugene Eka; Freddy Gelam; Ken Gogote; Junior Hoki; Sam Hoki; Kele Lessy; Farapo Makura; Ravu Ravu; Suckling Ray; Andrew Turlom; Bobby Vavona; Elison Waluka	Fiji: Aisake Sovakiwai; Eroni Kotoiwasawasa; Jalesi Young; Jerimiah Rokowaqa; Johanson Nauluvula; Lui Wye; Petueli Taufaga; Pita Waqa; Ro Veceli Mataitini; Mosese Sivo; Semi Raikuna; Ratu Timoci Siqila; Rusiate Uluimoala; Ratu Tila Kabakoro
Women	Samoa: Isabella Nasalio; Caitlyn Ah Fook; Ella Bussey-Timo; Chrioni Posini; April Ah Poe; Charlize Fleming; Fuatino Taina; Delaney Ah Fook; Saelua Vanessa Leaula; Jessemina-silvia Fong; Lutia Col Aumua; Bettina Kennar; Maria Siaosi; Ane Ah Poe	Papua New Guinea: Grace Kouba; Natalie Kuper; Nadya Taubuso; Angelena Watego; Maria Alu; Mangai Elomi; Georgina Genaka; Angela Geno; Emmalyn John; Kelly Peter; Rita Rema; Monica Teite; Joylyne Tikot; Vavine Yore	Fiji: Alanieta Marakibau; Andie Koroi; Fransisca Daveta; Lavenia Tunidau; Lice Ravai; Makereta Vodo; Makeeda Tawakilai; Phoebe Ledua; Sisilia Raravula; Siteri Tawakevou; Virginia Elo; Adi Litia Nanova; Danielle Siteri Keli; Ligieta Tukana
Mixed	Samoa	Papua New Guinea	Fiji

== See also ==
- Touch rugby at the Pacific Games
