= Netball at the 2023 Pacific Games =

- Netball pictogram for the Games
- Venues: Friendship Hall
- Location: Honiara, Solomon Islands
- Dates: 27 November – 2 December 2023
- Teams: 9

Netball was one of the sports played at the 2023 Pacific Games which were be held in Honiara, Solomon Islands. This was the thirteenth time that netball has been in the games since its inclusion in 1963. The competition took place between 27 November to 2 December 2023.

== Participating nations ==
Nine nations and territories competed. They included the following:

- Cook Islands
- Fiji
- Niue
- Norfolk Island
- Papua New Guinea
- Samoa
- Solomon Islands (Host)
- Tonga
- Vanuatu

== Preliminary round ==
=== Group A ===
Pos	Team	Pld	W	D	L	GF	GA	%	Pts	Qualification
1	Tonga	4	4	0	0	335	112		8	Semifinals
2	Papua New Guinea	4	3	0	1	310	135		6	Semifinals
3	Cook Islands	4	2	0	2	222	176		4	
4	Niue	4	1	0	3	118	280		2	
5	Vanuatu	4	0	0	4	65	347		0	

Source: SOL2023

27 November 2023; 8:30	Report	Niue	17–90	Tonga	Friendship Hall, Honiara

27 November 2023; 10:30	Report	Cook Islands	84–13	Vanuatu	Friendship Hall, Honiara

27 November 2023; 14:30	Report	Papua New Guinea	54–62	Tonga	Friendship Hall, Honiara

28 November 2023; 8:30	Report	Cook Islands	72–18	Niue	Friendship Hall, Honiara

28 November 2023; 10:30	Report	Tonga	106–11	Vanuatu	Friendship Hall, Honiara

28 November 2023; 14:30	Report	Cook Islands	36–68	Papua New Guinea	Friendship Hall, Honiara

29 November 2023; 8:30	Report	Papua New Guinea	98 – 13	Vanuatu	Friendship Hall, Honiara

29 November 2023; 14:30	Report	Niue	59 – 28	Vanuatu	Friendship Hall, Honiara

29 November 2023; 16:30	Report	Cook Islands	30 – 77	Tonga	Friendship Hall, Honiara

30 November 2023; 10:30	Report	Niue	24 – 90	Papua New Guinea	Friendship Hall, Honiara

=== Group B ===
Pos	Team	Pld	W	D	L	GF	GA	%	Pts	Qualification
1	Fiji	3	3	0	0	250	81		6	Semifinals
2	Samoa	3	2	0	1	200	95		4	Semifinals
3	Norfolk Island	3	1	0	2	70	205		2	
4	Solomon Islands (H)	3	0	0	3	78	217		0	

Source: SOL2023 (H) Hosts

27 November 2023; 12:30	Report	Norfolk Island	14–73	Samoa	Friendship Hall, Honiara

27 November 2023; 16:30	Report	Fiji	90–25	Solomon Islands	Friendship Hall, Honiara

28 November 2023; 12:30	Report	Norfolk Island	40–34	Solomon Islands	Friendship Hall, Honiara

28 November 2023; 16:30	Report	Fiji	62–40	Samoa	Friendship Hall, Honiara

29 November 2023; 10:30	Report	Samoa	87 – 19	Solomon Islands	Friendship Hall, Honiara

29 November 2023; 12:30	Report	Fiji	98 – 16	Norfolk Island	Friendship Hall, Honiara

== Consolation Stage ==
=== 5th place match ===
1 December 2023; 14:30	Cook Islands	42–36	Norfolk Island	Friendship Hall, Honiara

=== 7th place match ===
1 December 2023; 08:30	Report	Niue	55–54	Solomon Islands	Friendship Hall, Honiara

=== 8th place match ===
1 December 2023; 16:30	Solomon Islands	65–32	Vanuatu	Friendship Hall, Honiara

== Knockout stage ==
Semifinals
1 December - Honiara
Tonga	58
Samoa	56
1 December - Honiara
Fiji	59
Papua New Guinea	45

Final
2 December - Honiara
Tonga	56
Fiji	52
Third place
2 December - Honiara
Papua New Guinea	49
Samoa	52

== Final standings ==
Place	Nation
Gold	Tonga
Silver	Fiji
Bronze	Samoa
4	Papua New Guinea
5	Cook Islands
6	Norfolk Island
7	Niue
8	Solomon Islands
9	Vanuatu

== Medalists ==
Gold	Silver	Bronze
Tonga	Fiji	Samoa
Kalolaine Aukafolau; Otolose Faingaanuku; Lucia Fauonuku; Marie Hansen; Emma Mateo; Beyonce Palavi; Uneeq Palavi; Silia Setefano; Peti Talanoa; Halaevalu Toutaiolepo; Jaelin Tulikaki; Hulita Veve	Adi Bolakoro; Jimaima Kete; Unaisi Kubunameca; Alisi Naqiri; Anaseini Nauqe; Kelera Nawai; Maliana Rusivakula; Unouna Rusivakula; Naiviniya Sivo; Ro Kalesi Tawake; Reama Verekauta; Alesi Waqa	Papi Alaalatoa; Sayonara Alaalatoa; Gardenia Asiata; Grace Lui; Kristiana Manua; Abigail Meafou; Lenora Misa; Asolelei Niumata; Tiana Placid; Soli Ropati; Naomi Solomona; Auteletoa Tanimo

== See also ==
- Netball at the Pacific Games
