= Guam at the 2023 Pacific Games =

- IOC code: GUM
- National federation: Guam National Olympic Committee

19 November 2023 – 2 December 2023
- Competitors: 49 (23 men and 26 women) in 3 sports
- Medals Ranked 10th: Gold 7 Silver 4 Bronze 6 Total 17

Pacific Games appearances
- 1966; 1969; 1971; 1975; 1979; 1983; 1987; 1991; 1995; 1999; 2003; 2007; 2011; 2015; 2019; 2023

Guam competed at the 2023 Pacific Games in Honiara from 19 November to 2 December 2023. These games were Guam's sixteenth appearance since first participating in the second edition in 1966.

== Competitors ==
The following is the list of number of competitors in the Games.

Sport	Men	Women	Total
Athletics	2	6	8
Basketball	16	16	32
Weightlifting	5	4	9
Total	23	26	49

== Athletics ==
Guam Track and Field Association will enter eight athletes in track and field.

Key

- Note–Ranks given for track events are within the athlete's heat only
- Q = Qualified for the next round
- q = Qualified for the next round as a fastest loser or, in field events, by position without achieving the qualifying target
- qR = Qualified to the next round by referee judgement
- NR = National record
- N/A = Round not applicable for the event
- Bye = Athlete not required to compete in round

Men

Athlete	Event	Heat		Semifinal		Final	
Athlete	Event	Result	Rank	Result	Rank	Result	Rank
Jeofry Limitiaco	400 m			—N/a			
Jeofry Limitiaco	400 m hurdles			—N/a			
Hugh Kent	5000 m	—N/a					
Hugh Kent	10000 m	—N/a					
Hugh Kent	3000 m steeplechase	—N/a					
Hugh Kent	Half marathon	—N/a					

Women

Athlete	Event	Heat		Semifinal		Final	
Athlete	Event	Result	Rank	Result	Rank	Result	Rank
Erica Palisoc	100 m						
Erica Palisoc	200 m						
Taylor-Ann Santos	100 m						
Taylor-Ann Santos	200 m						
Taylor-Ann Santos	Long jump			—N/a			
Taylor-Ann Santos	Triple jump	—N/a					
Regine Tugade-Watson	100 m						
Regine Tugade-Watson	200 m						
Regine Tugade-Watson	Long jump			—N/a			
Regine Tugade-Watson	Triple jump	—N/a					
Gwenizah-Yvonne Barcinas	800 m	—N/a					
Gwenizah-Yvonne Barcinas	1500 m	—N/a					
Gwenizah-Yvonne Barcinas	400 m hurdles			—N/a			
Jordan Baden	1500 m	—N/a					
Jordan Baden	5000 m	—N/a					
Hazel Wilson	100 m hurdles			—N/a			
Hazel Wilson	400 m hurdles			—N/a			
	4×100 m relay			—N/a			
	4×400 m relay			—N/a			

== Basketball ==
=== 5×5 basketball ===
Summary

Team	Event	Preliminary round				Qualifying finals	Semifinals	Final / GM	
Team	Event	Opposition Score	Opposition Score	Opposition Score	Rank	Opposition Score	Opposition Score	Opposition Score	Rank
Guam men's	Men's	Papua New Guinea –	Samoa –	Solomon Islands –					
Guam Women's	Women's	Fiji –	Samoa –	Solomon Islands –					

==== Men's tournament ====
Guam national basketball team qualified for the Pacific Games after winning gold at the 2022 FIBA Micronesia Basketball Cup in Mangilao, Guam.

Team roster

- Men's team event – one team of 12 players

==== Women's tournament ====
Guam women's national basketball team qualified for the Pacific Games after winning gold at the 2022 FIBA Women's Micronesia Basketball Cup in Mangilao, Guam.

Team roster

- Women's team event – one team of 12 players

== Weightlifting ==
The Guam National Olympic Committee selected nine weightlifters (5 men, 4 women) for the 2023 Games.

Men

Athlete	Event	Snatch	Rank	Clean & jerk	Rank	Total	Rank
Vinci Levi Ebidag	55 kg						
Krysthian Villanueva	67 kg						
David Bautista	73 kg						
Ethan Elwell	96 kg						
Peter San Nicolas	+109 kg						

Women

Athlete	Event	Snatch	Rank	Clean & jerk	Rank	Total	Rank
Nicola Lagatao	45 kg						
Erica Camacho	49 kg						
Chloe Santos	55 kg						
Jacinta Sumagaysay	59 kg						
