= Australia at the 2024 Summer Olympics =

- IOC code: AUS
- NOC: Australian Olympic Committee
- Website: www.olympics.com.au

in Paris, France 26 July 2024 – 11 August 2024
- Competitors: 459 (203 men and 256 women) in 33 sports
- Flag bearers (opening): Eddie Ockenden & Jessica Fox
- Flag bearers (closing): Matthew Wearn & Kaylee McKeown
- Officials: Anna Meares (chef de mission)
- Medals Ranked 4th: Gold 18 Silver 19 Bronze 16 Total 53

Summer Olympics appearances (overview)
- 1896; 1900; 1904; 1908; 1912; 1920; 1924; 1928; 1932; 1936; 1948; 1952; 1956; 1960; 1964; 1968; 1972; 1976; 1980; 1984; 1988; 1992; 1996; 2000; 2004; 2008; 2012; 2016; 2020; 2024; 2028

Other related appearances
- 1906 Intercalated Games –––– Australasia (1908–1912)

Australia competed at the 2024 Summer Olympics at Paris from 26 July to 11 August 2024. Australian athletes have appeared in every Summer Olympic Games of the modern era, alongside France, Great Britain, Greece, and Switzerland. As Brisbane will stage the 2032 Summer Olympics, Australia and the United States, the next nation to host the 2028 Summer Olympics in Los Angeles, marched before the homebound French team entering the Place du Trocadéro during the parade of nations segment of the opening ceremony.

The Australian Olympic team left Paris with 53 medals winning 18 gold, marking the country's most successful Olympic campaign in terms of gold medals, and the second most successful in terms of overall medals after Sydney 2000, where 58 medals were won.

== Administration ==
Australia's final team consisted of 461 athletes (205 men and 256 women) competing in 33 sports, with Anna Meares selected as the chef de mission.

On July 24, 2024, field hockey player Eddie Ockenden and slalom canoeist Jessica Fox were named as the flag-bearers to lead the country's opening ceremony.

On August 10, sailor Matthew Wearn and swimmer Kaylee McKeown, both gold medalists in Paris, were named flag-bearers for the closing ceremony.

== Medalists ==
The following Australian competitors won medals at the games. In the discipline sections below, the medalists' names are bolded.

Medal	Name	Sport	Event	Date
Gold	Grace Brown	Cycling	Women's road time trial	27 July
Gold	Ariarne Titmus	Swimming	Women's 400 m freestyle	27 July
Gold	Bronte Campbell^{[a]} Meg Harris; Shayna Jack; Emma McKeon; Mollie O'Callaghan; Olivia Wunsch^{[a]}	Swimming	Women's 4 × 100 m freestyle relay	27 July
Gold	Jessica Fox	Canoeing	Women's slalom K-1	28 July
Gold	Mollie O'Callaghan	Swimming	Women's 200 m freestyle	29 July
Gold	Kaylee McKeown	Swimming	Women's 100 m backstroke	30 July
Gold	Jessica Fox	Canoeing	Women's slalom C-1	31 July
Gold	Shayna Jack^{[a]} Mollie O'Callaghan; Lani Pallister; Jamie Perkins^{[a]} Ariarne Titmus; Brianna Throssell	Swimming	Women's 4 × 200 m freestyle relay	1 August
Gold	Cameron McEvoy	Swimming	Men's 50 m freestyle	2 August
Gold	Kaylee McKeown	Swimming	Women's 200 m backstroke	2 August
Gold	Saya Sakakibara	Cycling	Women's BMX racing	2 August
Gold	Matthew Ebden; John Peers	Tennis	Men's doubles	3 August
Gold	Noemie Fox	Canoeing	Women's kayak cross	5 August
Gold	Arisa Trew	Skateboarding	Women's park	6 August
Gold	Matthew Wearn	Sailing	Men's Laser	7 August
Gold	Keegan Palmer	Skateboarding	Men's park	7 August
Gold	Oliver Bleddyn; Kelland O'Brien; Sam Welsford; Connor Leahy	Cycling	Men's team pursuit	7 August
Gold	Nina Kennedy	Athletics	Women's pole vault	7 August
Silver	Elijah Winnington	Swimming	Men's 400 m freestyle	27 July
Silver	Jack Cartwright; Kyle Chalmers; Flynn Southam; Kai Taylor; William Yang^{[a]}	Swimming	Men's 4 × 100 m freestyle relay	27 July
Silver	Chris Burton	Equestrian	Individual eventing	29 July
Silver	Ariarne Titmus	Swimming	Women's 200 m freestyle	29 July
Silver	Kyle Chalmers	Swimming	Men's 100 m freestyle	31 July
Silver	Zac Stubblety-Cook	Swimming	Men's 200 m breaststroke	31 July
Silver	Grae Morris	Sailing	Men's iQFoil	3 August
Silver	Ariarne Titmus	Swimming	Women's 800 m freestyle	3 August
Silver	Nicola Olyslagers	Athletics	Women's high jump	4 August
Silver	Meg Harris	Swimming	Women's 50 m freestyle	4 August
Silver	Iona Anderson^{[a]} Meg Harris^{[a]} Emma McKeon; Kaylee McKeown; Mollie O'Callaghan; Alexandria Perkins^{[a]} Jenna Strauch; Ella Ramsay^{[a]}	Swimming	Women's 4 × 100 m medley relay	4 August
Silver	Jack Robinson	Surfing	Men's shortboard	6 August
Silver	Moesha Johnson	Swimming	Women's marathon 10km	8 August
Silver	Riley Fitzsimmons; Pierre van der Westhuyzen; Jackson Collins; Noah Havard	Canoeing	Men's K-4 500 m	8 August
Silver	Maddison Keeney	Diving	Women's 3 m springboard	9 August
Silver	Matthew Richardson	Cycling	Men's sprint	9 August
Silver	Australia women's national water polo team: Gabriella Palm; Keesja Gofers; Elle Armit; Bronte Halligan; Sienna Green; Abby Andrews; Charlize Andrews; Sienna Hearn; Zoe Arancini; Alice Williams; Matilda Kearns; Genevieve Longman; Danijela Jackovich	Water polo	Women's tournament	10 August
Silver	Jessica Hull	Athletics	Women's 1500 m	10 August
Silver	Matthew Richardson	Cycling	Men's keirin	11 August
Bronze	Maximillian Giuliani; Zac Incerti^{[a]} Thomas Neill; Flynn Southam; Kai Taylor^{[a]} Elijah Winnington	Swimming	Men's 4 × 200 m freestyle relay	30 July
Bronze	Natalya Diehm	Cycling	Women's BMX freestyle	31 July
Bronze	Penny Smith	Shooting	Women's trap	31 July
Bronze	Jemima Montag	Athletics	Women's 20 km walk	1 August
Bronze	Jessica Morrison; Annabelle McIntyre	Rowing	Women's pair	2 August
Bronze	Kaylee McKeown	Swimming	Women's 200 m individual medley	3 August
Bronze	Iona Anderson^{[a]} Kyle Chalmers^{[a]} Emma McKeon^{[a]} Kaylee McKeown; Mollie O'Callaghan; Zac Stubblety-Cook^{[a]} Matthew Temple; Joshua Yong	Swimming	Mixed 4 × 100 m medley relay	3 August
Bronze	Eleanor Patterson	Athletics	Women's high jump	4 August
Bronze	Matthew Glaetzer; Leigh Hoffman; Matthew Richardson	Cycling	Men's team sprint	6 August
Bronze	Jemima Montag; Rhydian Cowley	Athletics	Mixed marathon walk relay	7 August
Bronze	Matthew Denny	Athletics	Men's discus throw	7 August
Bronze	Charlie Senior	Boxing	Men's 57 kg	8 August
Bronze	Caitlin Parker	Boxing	Women's 75 kg	8 August
Bronze	Jean van der Westhuyzen; Thomas Green	Canoeing	Men's K-2 500 m	9 August
Bronze	Australia women's national basketball team: Jade Melbourne; Kristy Wallace; Stephanie Talbot; Tess Madgen; Alanna Smith; Ezi Magbegor; Marianna Tolo; Cayla George; Amy Atwell; Isobel Borlase; Lauren Jackson; Sami Whitcomb	Basketball	Women's tournament	11 August
Bronze	Matthew Glaetzer	Cycling	Men's keirin	11 August

Medals by sport
Sport	1st place, gold medalist(s)	2nd place, silver medalist(s)	3rd place, bronze medalist(s)	Total
Swimming	7	9	3	**19**
Cycling	3	2	3	**8**
Canoeing	3	1	1	**5**
Skateboarding	2	0	0	**2**
Athletics	1	2	4	**7**
Sailing	1	1	0	**2**
Tennis	1	0	0	**1**
Equestrian	0	1	0	**1**
Surfing	0	1	0	**1**
Diving	0	1	0	**1**
Water Polo	0	1	0	**1**
Boxing	0	0	2	**2**
Rowing	0	0	1	**1**
Shooting	0	0	1	**1**
Basketball	0	0	1	**1**
Total	18	19	16	53

Medals by day
Day	Date	1st place, gold medalist(s)	2nd place, silver medalist(s)	3rd place, bronze medalist(s)	Total
1	27 July	3	2	0	**5**
2	28 July	1	0	0	**1**
3	29 July	1	2	0	**3**
4	30 July	1	0	1	**2**
5	31 July	1	2	2	**5**
6	1 August	1	0	1	**2**
7	2 August	3	0	1	**4**
8	3 August	1	2	2	**5**
9	4 August	0	3	1	**4**
10	5 August	1	1	0	**2**
11	6 August	1	0	1	**2**
12	7 August	4	0	2	**6**
13	8 August	0	2	2	**4**
14	9 August	0	2	1	**3**
15	10 August	0	2	0	**2**
16	11 August	0	1	2	**3**
Total		18	19	16	53

Medals by gender
Gender	1st place, gold medalist(s)	2nd place, silver medalist(s)	3rd place, bronze medalist(s)	Total
Female	13	9	8	**30**
Male	5	10	6	**21**
Mixed	0	0	2	**2**
Total	18	19	16	53

Multiple medalists
Name	Sport	1st place, gold medalist(s)	2nd place, silver medalist(s)	3rd place, bronze medalist(s)	Total
Mollie O'Callaghan	Swimming	3	1	1	**5**
Kaylee McKeown	Swimming	2	1	2	**5**
Ariarne Titmus	Swimming	2	2	0	**4**
Meg Harris	Swimming	1	2	0	**3**
Emma McKeon	Swimming	1	1	1	**3**
Kyle Chalmers	Swimming	0	2	1	**3**
Jessica Fox	Canoeing	2	0	0	**2**
Shayna Jack	Swimming	2	0	0	**2**
Matthew Richardson	Cycling	0	2	1	**3**
Iona Anderson	Swimming	0	1	1	**2**
Flynn Southam	Swimming	0	1	1	**2**
Zac Stubblety-Cook	Swimming	0	1	1	**2**
Kai Taylor	Swimming	0	1	1	**2**
Elijah Winnington	Swimming	0	1	1	**2**
Jemima Montag	Athletics	0	0	2	**2**
Matthew Glaetzer	Cycling	0	0	2	**2**

^{a} Athletes who participated in the heats only.

== Competitors ==
The following is the list of number of competitors in the Games.

Sport	Men	Women	Total
Archery	1	1	2
Artistic swimming	—N/a	8	8
Athletics	34	41	75
Badminton	0	3	3
Basketball	12	16	28
Boxing	6	6	12
Breaking	1	1	2
Canoeing	8	7	15
Cycling	12	13	25
Diving	4	5	9
Equestrian	5	5	10
Field hockey	16	16	32
Football	0	19	19
Golf	2	2	4
Gymnastics	1	11	12
Judo	1	2	3
Modern pentathlon	0	1	1
Rowing	14	21	35
Rugby sevens	12	12	24
Sailing	6	6	12
Shooting	6	4	10
Skateboarding	4	5	9
Sport Climbing	1	1	2
Surfing	2	2	4
Swimming	23	21	44
Table tennis	3	3	6
Taekwondo	2	1	3
Tennis	5	4	9
Triathlon	2	2	4
Volleyball	4	2	6
Water polo	13	13	26
Weightlifting	1	2	3
Wrestling	2	0	2
Total	203	256	459

== Archery ==
Two Australian archers qualified for the 2024 Summer Olympics men's and women's individual recurve competitions by virtue of their mixed team gold medal results at the 2023 Pacific Games in Honiara, Solomon Islands.

Athlete	Event	Ranking round		Round of 64	Round of 32	Round of 16	Quarterfinals	Semifinals	Final / BM	
Athlete	Event	Score	Seed	Opposition Score	Opposition Score	Opposition Score	Opposition Score	Opposition Score	Opposition Score	Rank
Peter Boukouvalas	Men's individual	638	60	Lee (KOR); L 0–6	Did not advance					
Laura Paeglis	Women's individual	640	44	Lopez (FRA); L 4–6	Did not advance					
Peter Boukouvalas; Laura Paeglis	Mixed team	1278	26	Did not advance						26

== Artistic swimming ==
Australia fielded a squad of eight artistic swimmers to compete in the women's duet and mixed team event as the highest-ranked Oceanian nation eligible for qualification at the 2023 FINA World Championships in Fukuoka, Japan.

Athlete	Event	Technical routine		Free routine			Acrobatic routine		
Athlete	Event	Points	Rank	Points	Total (technical + free)	Rank	Points	Total (technical + free + acrobatic)	Rank
Carolyn Rayna Buckle; Kiera Gazzard	Duet	210.0782	14	198.0271	408.1053	16	—N/a		
Carolyn Rayna Buckle; Georgia Courage-Gardiner; Raphaelle Gauthier; Kiera Gazzard; Margo Joseph-Kuo; Anastasia Kusmawan; Zoe Poulis; Milena Waldmann	Team	235.9071	10	280.5521	516.4592	9	211.9766	728.4358	9

== Athletics ==
Australian track and field athletes achieved the entry standards for Paris 2024, either by passing the direct qualifying mark (or time for track and road races) or by world ranking, in the following events (a maximum of 3 athletes each). If there are more than three qualified Australians in any event, preference will generally be given to the highest finishers at the 2024 Australian Athletics Championships.

Key

- Note–Ranks given for track events are within the athlete's heat only
- Q = Qualified for the next round
- q = Qualified for the next round as the fastest loser or, in field events, by position without achieving the qualifying target
- R = Qualified for the repechage round
- NR = National record
- N/A = Round not applicable for the event
- Bye = Athlete not required to compete in round

Track and road events
Men

Athlete	Event	Preliminary		Heat		Repechage		Semifinal		Final	
Athlete	Event	Time	Rank	Time	Rank	Time	Rank	Time	Rank	Time	Rank
Joshua Azzopardi	100 m	Bye		10.20	4	—N/a		Did not advance			
Rohan Browning	100 m	Bye		10.29 =SB	6	—N/a		Did not advance			
Calab Law	200 m	—N/a		20.75	7 R	DNS		Did not advance			
Reece Holder	400 m	—N/a		44.53 PB	3 Q	Bye		44.94	5	Did not advance	
Peter Bol	800 m	—N/a		1:47.50	7 R	1:46.12	4	Did not advance			
Peyton Craig	800 m	—N/a		1:45.81	3 Q	Bye		1:44.11	6	Did not advance	
Joseph Deng	800 m	—N/a		1:45.87	6 R	1:48.58	5	Did not advance			
Oliver Hoare	1500 m	—N/a		3:39.11	13 R	3:34.00	5	Did not advance			
Stewart McSweyn	1500 m	—N/a		3:36.55	11 R	3:37.49	12	Did not advance			
Adam Spencer	1500 m	—N/a		3:37.68	8 R	3:34.45 PB	6	Did not advance			
Morgan McDonald	5000 m	—N/a		13:52.67	9	—N/a				Did not advance	
Stewart McSweyn	5000 m	—N/a		14:12.31	12 qJ	—N/a				13:31.38	18
Tayleb Willis	Men's 110 m hurdles	—N/a		13.63	5 R	13.67	5	Did not advance			
Ben Buckingham	Men's 3000 m steeplechase	—N/a		8:32.12	10	—N/a				Did not advance	
Matthew Clarke	Men's 3000 m steeplechase	—N/a		8:49.85	11	—N/a				Did not advance	
Joshua Azzopardi; Jacob Despard; Calab Law; Lachlan Kennedy	4 × 100 m relay	—N/a		38.12 AR	6	—N/a				Did not advance	
Liam Adams	Marathon	—N/a								2:13:33	49
Andrew Buchanan	Marathon	—N/a								2:12:58	45
Patrick Tiernan	Marathon	—N/a								2:10:34	24
Rhydian Cowley	20 km walk	—N/a								1:20:04	12
Kyle Swan	20 km walk	—N/a								1:23:32	35
Declan Tingay	20 km walk	—N/a								1:19:56	11

Women

Athlete	Event	Preliminary		Heat		Repechage		Semifinal		Final	
Athlete	Event	Time	Rank	Time	Rank	Time	Rank	Time	Rank	Time	Rank
Ella Connolly	100 m	Bye		11.29	6	—N/a		Did not advance			
Bree Masters	100 m	Bye		11.26	3 Q	—N/a		11.34	7	Did not advance	
Mia Gross	200 m	—N/a		23.36	6 R	23.34	4	Did not advance			
Torrie Lewis	200 m	—N/a		22.89	4 R	23.08	1 Q	22.92	7	Did not advance	
Ellie Beer	400 m	—N/a		51.47	5 R	51.65	4	Did not advance			
Abbey Caldwell	800 m	—N/a		1:58.49	5 R	2:00.07	1 Q	1:58.52	5	Did not advance	
Catriona Bisset	800 m	—N/a		2:01.60	7 R	2:02.35	3	Did not advance			
Claudia Hollingsworth	800 m	—N/a		1:58.77	2 Q	Bye		2:01.51	7	Did not advance	
Georgia Griffith	1500 m	—N/a		3:59.22	4 Q	Bye		4:02.69	9	Did not advance	
Linden Hall	1500 m	—N/a		4:03.89	8 R	4:09.05	8	Did not advance			
Jessica Hull	1500 m	—N/a		4:02.70	2 Q	Bye		3:55.40	2 Q	3:52.56	2nd place, silver medalist(s)
Isobel Batt-Doyle	5000 m	—N/a		15:03.64	9	—N/a				Did not advance	
Rose Davies	5000 m	—N/a		15:00.86	3 Q	—N/a				14:49.67	11
Lauren Ryan	5000 m	—N/a		15:29.35	13	—N/a				Did not advance	
Lauren Ryan	10,000 m	—N/a								31:13.25	13
Liz Clay	100 m hurdles	—N/a		12.94	4 R	12.99	5	Did not advance			
Michelle Jenneke	100 m hurdles	—N/a		20.85	8 R	13.86	7	Did not advance			
Celeste Mucci	100 m hurdles	—N/a		13.05	7 R	13.00	5	Did not advance			
Sarah Carli	Women's 400 m hurdles	—N/a		55.92	6 R	55.12	4	Did not advance			
Alanah Yukich	Women's 400 m hurdles	—N/a		55.46	7 R	55.11	=2 Q	55.49	7	Did not advance	
Amy Cashin	Women's 3000 m steeplechase	—N/a		9:32.93	9	—N/a				Did not advance	
Cara Feain-Ryan	Women's 3000 m steeplechase	—N/a		9:28.72	11	—N/a				Did not advance	
Ella Connolly; Kristie Edwards; Torrie Lewis; Bree Masters	4 × 100 m relay	—N/a		42.75	4	—N/a				Did not advance	
Sinead Diver	Marathon	—N/a								DNF	
Genevieve Gregson	Marathon	—N/a								2:29:56	24
Jessica Stenson	Marathon	—N/a								2:26:45	13
Rebecca Henderson	20 km walk	—N/a								1:34:22	31
Jemima Montag	20 km walk	—N/a								1:26:25 OC	3rd place, bronze medalist(s)
Olivia Sandery	20 km walk	—N/a								DNF	

Mixed

Athlete	Event	Final	
Athlete	Event	Time	Rank
Jemima Montag; Rhydian Cowley	Marathon race walking relay	2:51:38	3rd place, bronze medalist(s)
Rebecca Henderson; Declan Tingay	Marathon race walking relay	3:09:21	22

Field events
Men

Athlete	Event	Qualification		Final	
Athlete	Event	Result	Rank	Result	Rank
Joel Baden	High jump	2.15	27	Did not advance	
Yual Reath	High jump	2.20	23	Did not advance	
Brendon Starc	High jump	2.24	13	Did not advance	
Kurtis Marschall	Pole vault	5.70	=11 q	5.85	6
Liam Adcock	Long jump	7.56	27	Did not advance	
Chris Mitrevski	Long jump	7.79	18	Did not advance	
Connor Murphy	Triple jump	16.80	10 q	16.30	12
Matthew Denny	Discus throw	66.83	2 Q	69.31	3rd place, bronze medalist(s)
Cameron McEntyre	Javelin throw	81.18	16	Did not advance	

Women

Athlete	Event	Qualification		Final	
Athlete	Event	Result	Rank	Result	Rank
Nicola Olyslagers	High jump	1.95	=1 q	2.00	2nd place, silver medalist(s)
Eleanor Patterson	High jump	1.95	3 q	1.95	3rd place, bronze medalist(s)
Nina Kennedy	Pole vault	4.55	=1 q	4.90	1st place, gold medalist(s)
Brooke Buschkuehl	Long jump	6.31	25	Did not advance	
Taryn Gollshewsky	Discus throw	62.36	15	Did not advance	
Stephanie Ratcliffe	Hammer throw	70.07	15	Did not advance	
Kelsey-Lee Barber	Javelin throw	57.73 SB	26	Did not advance	
Mackenzie Little	Javelin throw	62.82	6 Q	60.32	12
Kathryn Mitchell	Javelin throw	62.40 SB	8 Q	62.63	7

Combined events – Men's decathlon

Athlete	Event	100 m	LJ	SP	HJ	400 m	110H	DT	PV	JT	1500 m	Final	Rank
Daniel Golubovic	Result	11.32	6.60	13.89	1.93	50.37	15.15	44.65	4.60	59.33	4:39.02	7566	19
Daniel Golubovic	Points	791	720	722	740	798	831	760	790	728	686	7566	19
Ashley Moloney	Result	10.56	7.05	13.40	DNF								
Ashley Moloney	Points	965	826	692	DNF								

Combined events – Women's heptathlon

Athlete	Event	100H	HJ	SP	200 m	LJ	JT	800 m	Final	Rank
Camryn Newton-Smith	Result	13.46	1.80	13.89	24.76	5.78	44.77	2:24.63	5982	19
Camryn Newton-Smith	Points	1052	978	735	909	783	759	762	5982	19
Tori West	Result	13.62	1.68	12.81	24.73	5.41	48.79	2:20.97	5848	20
Tori West	Points	1033	867	715	912	674	837	810	5848	20

== Badminton ==
Australia entered three badminton players into the Olympic tournament based on the BWF Race to Paris Rankings.

Athlete	Event	Group stage				Round of 16	Quarter-final	Semi-final	Final / BM
Athlete	Event	Opposition Score	Opposition Score	Rank	Opposition Score	Opposition Score	Opposition Score	Opposition Score	Rank
Tiffany Ho	Women's singles	Zhang (USA); L (9–21, 4–21)	Nguyễn (VIE); L (6–21, 3–21)	—N/a	3	Did not advance			
Setyana Mapasa; Angela Yu	Women's doubles	Matsuyama / Shida (JPN); L (18–21, 14–21)	Kim / Kong (KOR); L (12–21, 17–21)	Crasto / Ponnappa (IND); W (21–15, 21–10)	3	—N/a	Did not advance		

== Basketball ==
=== 5×5 basketball ===
Summary

Team	Event	Group stage				Quarterfinal	Semifinal	Final / BM	
Team	Event	Opposition Score	Opposition Score	Opposition Score	Rank	Opposition Score	Opposition Score	Opposition Score	Rank
Australia men's	Men's tournament	Spain; W 92–80	Canada; L 83–93	Greece; L 71–77	2 Q	Serbia; L 90–95 (OT)	Did not advance		7
Australia women's	Women's tournament	Nigeria; L 62–75	Canada; W 70–65	France; W 79–72	2 Q	Serbia; W 85–67	United States; L 64–85	Bronze Medal Match; Belgium; W 85–81	3rd place, bronze medalist(s)

==== Men's tournament ====
The Australia men's basketball team qualified for the games by virtue of their results through the 2023 FIBA Basketball World Cup in Philippines, Japan & Indonesia, as the highest-ranked squad from Oceanic zone.

Team roster A 22-player roster was announced on 10 April 2024. It was cut to 17 players on 16 May. The final squad was finalized on 5 July.

Australia men's national basketball team – 2024 Summer Olympics roster
Players
Coaches

Pos.	No.	Name	Age – Date of birth	Height	Club	Ctr.
PG	1	Dyson Daniels	21 – 17 March 2003	2.01 m (6 ft 7 in)	Atlanta Hawks	(United States)
G	3	Josh Giddey	21 – 10 October 2002	2.03 m (6 ft 8 in)	Chicago Bulls	(United States)
G	5	Patty Mills (C)	35 – 11 August 1988	1.88 m (6 ft 2 in)	Miami Heat	(United States)
SF	6	Josh Green	23 – 16 November 2000	1.96 m (6 ft 5 in)	Charlotte Hornets	(United States)
SF	7	Joe Ingles	36 – 2 October 1987	2.03 m (6 ft 8 in)	Minnesota Timberwolves	(United States)
G	8	Matthew Dellavedova	33 – 8 September 1990	1.93 m (6 ft 4 in)	Melbourne United	(Australia)
PG	11	Dante Exum	29 – 13 July 1995	1.96 m (6 ft 5 in)	Dallas Mavericks	(United States)
C	13	Jock Landale	28 – 25 October 1995	2.11 m (6 ft 11 in)	Houston Rockets	(United States)
PF	15	Nick Kay	31 – 3 August 1992	2.06 m (6 ft 9 in)	Shimane Susanoo Magic	(Japan)
SF	17	Jack McVeigh	28 – 26 June 1996	2.03 m (6 ft 8 in)	Houston Rockets	(United States)
C	22	Will Magnay	26 – 10 June 1998	2.08 m (6 ft 10 in)	Tasmania JackJumpers	(Australia)
C	26	Duop Reath	28 – 26 June 1996	2.06 m (6 ft 9 in)	Portland Trail Blazers	(United States)

Head coach

- (Australia) Brian Goorjian

Assistant coach(es)

- (Australia) Adam Caporn
- (Australia) Matt Nielsen
- (Australia) David Patrick

Legend

- (C) Team captain
- Club – describes last
  club before the tournament
- Age – describes age
  on 27 July 2024

Group play

Pos	Team	Pld	W	L	PF	PA	PD	Pts	Qualification
1	Canada	3	3	0	267	247	+20	6	Quarterfinals
2	Australia	3	1	2	246	250	−4	4 (Note: Australia 3 Pts, +6 PD; Greece 3 Pts, −1 PD; Spain 3 Pts, −5 PD.)	Quarterfinals
3	Greece	3	1	2	233	241	−8	4	Quarterfinals
4	Spain	3	1	2	249	257	−8	4	

Source: FIBA
Rules for classification: 1) classification points; 2) head-to-head results; 3) head-to-head game points difference; 4) head-to-head number of game points scored.
Notes:

27 July 2024
11:00

Boxscore

Australia	92–80	Spain
Scoring by quarter: 31–21, 18–21, 20–18, 23–20
Pts: Landale 20; Rebs: Landale 9 Asts: Giddey 8		Pts: Aldama 27; Rebs: Garuba 7 Asts: Brown 7

Stade Pierre-Mauroy, Lille
Attendance: 26,991
Referees: Gatis Saliņš (LAT), Omar Bermúdez (MEX), Juan Fernández (ARG)

30 July 2024
13:30

Boxscore

Canada	93–83	Australia
Scoring by quarter: 26–28, 19–21, 27–21, 21–13
Pts: Barrett 24; Rebs: Powell 9 Asts: Barrett, Murray 5		Pts: Giddey 19; Rebs: Landale 12; Asts: Giddey 6

Stade Pierre-Mauroy, Lille
Attendance: 26,980
Referees: Yohan Rosso (FRA), Johnny Batista (PUR), Takaki Kato (JPN)

2 August 2024
13:30

Boxscore

Australia	71–77	Greece
Scoring by quarter: 24–25, 12–28, 14–9, 21–15
Pts: Landale 17; Rebs: Giddey 11; Asts: Daniels 8		Pts: Antetokounmpo 20; Rebs: three players 7 Asts: Calathes 8

Stade Pierre-Mauroy, Lille
Attendance: 26,850
Referees: Roberto Vázquez (PUR), Mārtiņš Kozlovskis (LAT), Johnny Batista (PUR)

Quarterfinal

6 August 2024
14:30

Boxscore

Serbia	95–90 (OT)	Australia
Scoring by quarter: 17–31, 25–23, 25–11, 15–17, Overtime: 13–8
Pts: Jokić 21; Rebs: Jokić 14; Asts: Jokić 9		Pts: Mills 26; Rebs: Landale, Magnay 6 Asts: Exum 5

Accor Arena, Paris
Attendance: 12,317
Referees: Yohan Rosso (FRA), Julio Anaya (PAN), Wojciech Liszka (POL)

==== Women's tournament ====
The Australia women's national basketball team qualified by placing in the top three at the 2024 Olympic Qualifying Tournaments in Belém, Brazil.

Team roster A 26-player roster was announced on 26 March 2024. The final squad was revealed on 7 July 2024.

Australia women's national basketball team – 2024 Summer Olympics roster
Players
Coaches

Pos.	No.	Name	Age – Date of birth	Height	Club	Ctr.
G	2	Jade Melbourne	21 – 18 August 2002	1.78 m (5 ft 10 in)	Washington Mystics	(United States)
PG	3	Kristy Wallace	28 – 3 January 1996	1.80 m (5 ft 11 in)	Indiana Fever	(United States)
SF	6	Stephanie Talbot	30 – 15 June 1994	1.88 m (6 ft 2 in)	Los Angeles Sparks	(United States)
G	7	Tess Madgen (C)	33 – 12 August 1990	1.80 m (5 ft 11 in)	Sydney Flames	(Australia)
F	11	Alanna Smith	27 – 10 September 1996	1.90 m (6 ft 3 in)	Minnesota Lynx	(United States)
F	13	Ezi Magbegor	24 – 13 August 1999	1.93 m (6 ft 4 in)	Seattle Storm	(United States)
C	14	Marianna Tolo	35 – 2 July 1989	1.96 m (6 ft 5 in)	Uni Girona CB	(Spain)
F	15	Cayla George	35 – 1 May 1989	1.93 m (6 ft 4 in)	Sydney Flames	(Australia)
SF	17	Amy Atwell	26 – 30 June 1998	1.83 m (6 ft 0 in)	Bendigo Braves	(Australia)
G	20	Isobel Borlase	19 – 12 September 2004	1.80 m (5 ft 11 in)	Forestville Eagles	(Australia)
C	25	Lauren Jackson	43 – 11 May 1981	1.95 m (6 ft 5 in)	Southside Flyers	(Australia)
G	32	Sami Whitcomb	36 – 20 July 1988	1.78 m (5 ft 10 in)	Seattle Storm	(United States)

Head coach

- (Australia) Sandy Brondello

Assistant coach(es)

- (Australia) Cheryl Chambers
- (Australia) Paul Goriss
- (Australia) Shannon Seebohm

Legend

- (C) Team captain
- Club – describes last
  club before the tournament
- Age – describes age
  on 28 July 2024

Group play

Pos	Team	Pld	W	L	PF	PA	PD	Pts	Qualification
1	France (H)	3	2	1	222	187	+35	5 (Note: France 3 Pts, +14 PD; Australia 3 Pts, −6 PD; Nigeria 3 Pts, −8 PD.)	Quarterfinals
2	Australia	3	2	1	211	212	−1	5	Quarterfinals
3	Nigeria	3	2	1	208	207	+1	5	Quarterfinals
4	Canada	3	0	3	189	224	−35	3	

Source: FIBA
Rules for classification: 1) classification points; 2) head-to-head results; 3) head-to-head game points difference; 4) head-to-head number of game points scored.
(H) Hosts
Notes:

29 July 2024
11:00

Boxscore

Nigeria	75–62	Australia
Scoring by quarter: 18–17, 23–11, 10–19, 24–15
Pts: Kalu 19; Rebs: Kunaiyi-Akpannah, Musa 7 Asts: Amukamara 9		Pts: Smith 15; Rebs: Talbot 10; Asts: Talbot 12

Stade Pierre-Mauroy, Lille
Attendance: 24,023
Referees: Amy Bonner (USA), Rabah Noujaim (LBN), Jenna Reneau (USA)

1 August 2024
13:30

Boxscore

Australia	70–65	Canada
Scoring by quarter: 18–16, 20–16, 13–12, 19–21
Pts: Whitcomb 19; Rebs: Talbot 9 Asts: Whitcomb 10		Pts: Carleton 19; Rebs: Carleton 8 Asts: Achonwa 8

Stade Pierre-Mauroy, Lille
Attendance: 20,962
Referees: Andrés Bartel (URU), Rabah Noujaim (LBN), Jenna Reneau (USA)

4 August 2024
21:00

Boxscore

Australia	79–72	France
Scoring by quarter: 19–17, 15–17, 25–16, 20–22
Pts: Madgen 18; Rebs: Magbegor, Talbot 6 Asts: Whitcomb 7		Pts: Williams 15; Rebs: Badiane 6 Asts: Bernies 4

Stade Pierre-Mauroy, Lille
Attendance: 27,193
Referees: Luis Castillo (ESP), Maj Forsberg (DEN), Jenna Reneau (USA)

Quarterfinal

7 August 2024
11:00

Boxscore

Serbia	67–85	Australia
Scoring by quarter: 19–26, 13–22, 16–24, 19–13
Pts: Nogić 17; Rebs: Raca 7 Asts: Anderson, Nogić 5		Pts: Smith 22; Rebs: Smith 13; Asts: Melbourne 5

Accor Arena, Paris
Attendance: 12,337
Referees: Martin Vulić (CRO), Ariadna Chueca (ESP), Yevgeniy Mikheyev (KAZ)

Semifinal

9 August 2024
17:30

Boxscore

United States	85–64	Australia
Scoring by quarter: 20–16, 25–11, 21–13, 19–24
Pts: Young 14; Rebs: Wilson 8 Asts: three players 5		Pts: Borlase 11; Rebs: Smith 7 Asts: three players 3

Accor Arena, Paris
Attendance: 11,919
Referees: Gatis Saliņš (LAT), Viola Györgyi (NOR), Péter Praksch (HUN)

Bronze medal game

11 August 2024
11:30

Boxscore

Belgium	81–85	Australia
Scoring by quarter: 19–20, 17–17, 25–23, 20–25
Pts: Vanloo 26; Rebs: Linskens 8 Asts: Vanloo 11		Pts: Magbegor 30; Rebs: Magbegor 13; Asts: Melbourne 7

Accor Arena, Paris
Attendance: 11,968
Referees: Amy Bonner (USA), Blanca Burns (USA), Jenna Reneau (USA)

=== 3×3 basketball ===
Summary

Team	Event	Group stage								Play-in game	Semifinal	Final / BM	
Team	Event	Opposition Score	Opposition Score	Opposition Score	Opposition Score	Opposition Score	Opposition Score	Opposition Score	Rank	Opposition Score	Opposition Score	Opposition Score	Rank
Australia women's	Women's tournament	Canada; L 14–22	Germany; W 21–19	China; W 21–15	United States; W 17–15	Azerbaijan; W 21–12	Spain; L 17–21	France; L 16–18 (OT)	5 PI	Canada; L 10–21	Did not advance		5

==== Women's tournament ====
The Australia women's 3x3 team by winning the FIBA Universality-driven Olympic Qualifying Tournament 2 in Utsonomiya, Japan.

Team roster

The roster was named on 8 July 2024.

- Anneli Maley
- Lauren Mansfield
- Marena Whittle
- Alex Wilson

Group play

Pos	Team	Pld	W	L	PF	PA	PD	Qualification
1	Germany	7	6	1	117	100	+17	Semifinals
2	Spain	7	4 (Note: Spain 2–1; United States 2–1; Canada 1–2; Australia 1–2. Sorted by points scored after first tie broken.)	3	115	114	+1	Semifinals
3	United States	7	4	3	108	109	−1	Play-ins
4	Canada	7	4	3	129	112	+17	Play-ins
5	Australia	7	4	3	127	122	+5	Play-ins
6	China	7	2 (Note: China 1–1; France 1–1; Azerbaijan 1–1. Sorted by points scored.)	5	107	123	−16	Play-ins
7	Azerbaijan	7	2	5	106	123	−17	
8	France (H)	7	2	5	99	105	−6	

Source: FIBA
Rules for classification: 1) Wins; 2) Head-to-head record; 3) Points scored.
(H) Hosts
Notes:

30 July 2024
18:00

Boxscore

Australia	14–22	Canada
Pts: Wilson 6		Pts: K. Plouffe 10

Place de la Concorde, Paris
Referees: Najib Chajiddine (FRA), Shi Qirong (CHN)

31 July 2024
17:30

Boxscore

Germany	19–21	Australia
Pts: Greinacher 9		Pts: Whittle 9

Place de la Concorde, Paris
Referees: Marek Maliszewski (POL), Dorothy Okatch (BOT)

1 August 2024
09:00

Boxscore

China	15–21	Australia
Pts: Wang 5		Pts: Wilson 11

Place de la Concorde, Paris
Referees: Deanna Jackson (USA), Brigitta Csabai-Kaskötő (HUN)

1 August 2024
13:00

Boxscore

United States	15–17	Australia
Pts: Howard 8		Pts: Wilson 8

Place de la Concorde, Paris
Referees: Brigitta Csabai-Kaskötő (HUN), Jasmina Juras (SRB)

2 August 2024
09:30

Boxscore

Australia	21–12	Azerbaijan
Pts: Whittle 8		Pts: Hayes 6

Place de la Concorde, Paris
Referees: Deanna Jackson (USA), Dorothy Okatch (BOT)

2 August 2024
12:30

Boxscore

Australia	17–21	Spain
Pts: Whittle 7		Pts: Gimeno, Ygueravide 9

Place de la Concorde, Paris
Referees: Marek Maliszewski (POL), Deanna Jackson (USA)

3 August 2024
18:35

Boxscore

France	18–16 (OT)	Australia
Pts: Guapo 7		Pts: Whittle 8

Place de la Concorde, Paris
Referees: Marek Maliszewski (POL), Kim Ga-in (KOR)

Play-in

3 August 2024
21:30

Boxscore

Canada	21–10	Australia
Pts: Bosch 9		Pts: Maley 5

Place de la Concorde, Paris
Referees: Najib Chajiddine (FRA), Deanna Jackson (USA)

== Boxing ==
Australia entered twelve boxers into the Olympic tournament. All of them qualified for Paris in their respective weight division after winning gold at the 2023 Pacific Games in Honiara, Solomon Islands.

Men

Athlete	Event	Round of 32	Round of 16	Quarterfinals	Semifinals	Final	
Athlete	Event	Opposition Result	Opposition Result	Opposition Result	Opposition Result	Opposition Result	Rank
Yusuf Chothia	Men's 51 kg	—N/a	Lozano (ESP); L 1–4	Did not advance			
Charlie Senior	Men's 57 kg	Bye	Usturoi (BEL); W 4–1	Paalam (PHI); W 3–2	Khalokov (UZB); L 0–5	Did not advance	3rd place, bronze medalist(s)
Harry Garside	Men's 63.5 kg	Bye	Kovács (HUN); L 0–5	Did not advance			
Shannan Davey	Men's 71 kg	Bye	Kiwan (BUL); L 0–5	Did not advance			
Callum Peters	Men's 80 kg	Bye	Oralbay (KAZ); L 2–3	Did not advance			
Teremoana Jnr	Men's +92 kg	—N/a	Lovchynskyi (UKR); W KO	Jalolov (UZB); L 0–5	Did not advance		

Women

Athlete	Event	Round of 32	Round of 16	Quarterfinals	Semifinals	Final	
Athlete	Event	Opposition Result	Opposition Result	Opposition Result	Opposition Result	Opposition Result	Rank
Monique Suraci	Women's 50 kg	Bye	Valencia (COL); L 0–5	Did not advance			
Tiana Echegaray	Women's 54 kg	Bye	Akbaş (TUR); L 0–5	Did not advance			
Tina Rahimi	Women's 57 kg	Bye	Szeremeta (POL); L 0–5	Did not advance			
Tyla McDonald	Women's 60 kg	Bye	Palacios (ECU); L 0–5	Did not advance			
Marissa Williamson	Women's 66 kg	Bye	Hámori (HUN); L 0–5	Did not advance			
Caitlin Parker	Women's 75 kg	—N/a	Ortiz (MEX); W 5–0	El-Mardi (MAR); W 4–1	Qian (CHN); L 0–5	Did not advance	3rd place, bronze medalist(s)

== Breaking ==
Australia entered two breakdancers to compete in their respective gender-based dual battles for Paris 2024. Jeffrey Dan Arpie (J Attack) and Rachael Gunn (Raygun) secured the spots by virtue of their gold-medal victory each in the B-boys and B-girls final battle at the 2023 WDSF Oceanian Breaking Championships in Sydney, Australia.

Athlete	Nickname	Event	Group Stage			Quarterfinal	Semifinal	Final / BM	
Athlete	Nickname	Event	Round	Votes	Rank	Opposition Result	Opposition Result	Opposition Result	Rank
Jeffrey Dunne	J Attack	B-Boys	0	2	4	Did not advance			
Rachael Gunn	Raygun	B-Girls	0	0	4	Did not advance			

== Canoeing ==
=== Slalom ===
Australian canoeists confirmed a boat in the men's C-1 and K-1, women's C-1, K-1, and KX classes, respectively, for the Games through the 2023 ICF Canoe Slalom World Championships in London, Great Britain, and 2024 Oceania Championships in Penrith.

Athlete	Event	Preliminary						Semifinal		Final	
Athlete	Event	Run 1	Rank	Run 2	Rank	Best	Rank	Time	Rank	Time	Rank
Tristan Carter	Men's C-1	94.19	9	103.87	14	94.19	9 Q	99.45	8 Q	100.73	9
Timothy Anderson	Men's K-1	88.37	11	85.78	5	85.78	5 Q	94.95	10 Q	90.90	7
Jessica Fox	Women's C-1	100.5	2	103.10	1	100.5	2 Q	106.08	2 Q	101.06	1st place, gold medalist(s)
Jessica Fox	Women's K-1	95.20	2	92.18	1	92.18	1 Q	104.38	8 Q	96.08	1st place, gold medalist(s)

Kayak cross

Athlete	Event	Time trial		Round 1	Repechage	Heat	Quarterfinal	Semifinal	Final	
Athlete	Event	Time	Rank	Position	Position	Position	Position	Position	Position	Rank
Timothy Anderson	Men's KX-1	71.41	20	1 Q	Bye	1 Q	3	Did not advance		10
Tristan Carter	Men's KX-1	72.94	22	4 R	1 Q	2 Q	4	Did not advance		15
Jessica Fox	Women's KX-1	70.84	2	2 Q	Bye	4	Did not advance			26
Noemie Fox	Women's KX-1	73.09	8	1 Q	Bye	1 Q	1 SF	1 F	1	1st place, gold medalist(s)

=== Sprint ===
Australian canoeists qualified one boat in each of the following distances for the Games through the 2023 ICF Canoe Sprint World Championships in Duisburg, Germany.

Athlete	Event	Heats		Quarterfinals		Semifinals		Final	
Athlete	Event	Time	Rank	Time	Rank	Time	Rank	Time	Rank
Thomas Green	Men's K-1 1000 m	3:35.99	1 SF	Bye		3:33.52	7 FB	3:32.72	16
Thomas Green; Jean van der Westhuyzen	Men's K-2 500 m	1:28.59	1 SF	Bye		1:26.85	1 FA	1:27.29	3rd place, bronze medalist(s)
Jackson Collins; Riley Fitzsimmons; Noah Havard; Pierre van der Westhuyzen	Men's K-4 500 m	1:22.28	3 QF	1:19.39	1 SF	1:19.22	1 FA	1:19.84	2nd place, silver medalist(s)
Alyce Wood	Women's K-1 500 m	1:51.39	2 SF	Bye		1:51.99	3 FB	1:55.04	16
Ella Beere; Alyssa Bull	Women's K-2 500 m	1:46.21	4 QF	1:41.89	2 SF	1:40.26	4 FA	1:40.94	7
Ella Beere; Alyssa Bull; Alexandra Clarke; Yale Steinepreis	Women's K-4 500 m	1:34.60	4 SF	Bye		1:34.25	1 FA	1:35.96	8

Qualification Legend: FA – Qualify to final (medal); FB – Qualify to final B (non-medal); SF – Qualify to semifinal; QF – Qualify to quarterfinal

== Cycling ==
=== Road ===
Australia entered a team of six road cyclists (three male and three female). Australia qualified three male and three female athletes through the UCI Nation Ranking and 2023 World Championships in Glasgow, Great Britain.

Men

Athlete	Event	Time	Rank
Simon Clarke	Road race	6:23:16	32
Michael Matthews	Road race	6:21:47	15
Ben O'Connor	Road race	6:26:57	51
Luke Plapp	Time trial	DNF	

Women

Athlete	Event	Time	Rank
Grace Brown	Road race	4:04:23	23
Lauretta Hanson	Road race	4:04:23	22
Ruby Roseman-Gannon	Road race	4:07:12	39
Grace Brown	Time trial	39:38.24	1st place, gold medalist(s)

=== Track ===
Australian riders obtained full spots for men's track events and women's team pursuit, Madison, and Omnium, and two additional quotas for women's sprint and keirin based on their country's results in the final UCI Olympic rankings.

Sprint

Athlete	Event	Qualification		Round 1	Repechage 1	Round 2	Repechage 2	Round 3	Repechage 3	Quarterfinals	Semifinals	Finals / BM	
Athlete	Event	Time Speed (km/h)	Rank	Opposition Time Speed (km/h)	Opposition Time Speed (km/h)	Opposition Time Speed (km/h)	Opposition Time Speed (km/h)	Opposition Time Speed (km/h)	Opposition Time Speed (km/h)	Opposition Time Speed (km/h)	Opposition Time Speed (km/h)	Opposition Time Speed (km/h)	Rank
Leigh Hoffman	Men's sprint	9.242; 77.905	4	Wammes (CAN); W 9.652; 74.596	Bye	Obara (JPN); W 9.819; 73.327	Bye	Ota (JPN); L 9.904	Obara (JPN); Paul (TTO); L	Did not advance			
Matthew Richardson	Men's sprint	9.091; 79.199	2	Tjon (SUR); W 9.665; 74.496	Bye	Lendel (LTU); W 9.477; 75.973	Bye	Rudyk (POL); W 9.756; 73.801	Bye	Obara (JPN); W 9.796 (73.499); W 10.010 (71.928)	Hoogland (NED); W 9.640 (74.689); W 9.698 (74.242)	Lavreysen (NED); L 9.602; L 9.539	2nd place, silver medalist(s)
Kristina Clonan	Women's sprint	10.310; 69.835	11	Peet (NED); W 10.980; 65.574	Bye	Hinze (GER); L 10.973	Kouamé (FRA); W 10.804; 66.642	Finucane (GBR); L 11.207	Mitchell (CAN); Sato (JPN); L 10.908	Did not advance			
Chloe Moran	Women's sprint	11.112; 64.795	27	Did not advance									
Matthew Glaetzer; Matthew Richardson; Leigh Hoffman	Men's team sprint	42.072; 64.176	3 Q	—N/a							China; W/QB 42.336; 63.776	France; W 41.597; 64.909	3rd place, bronze medalist(s)

Qualification legend: Q – Qualify to next round; FA – Gold medal final; FB – Bronze medal final; FC – Fifth place final; FD – Seventh place final

Pursuit

Athlete	Event	Qualification		Semifinals		Final	
Athlete	Event	Time	Rank	Opponent Time	Rank	Opponent Time	Rank
Oliver Bleddyn; Kelland O'Brien; Connor Leahy; Sam Welsford	Men's team pursuit	3:42.958	1 Q	Italy; W 3:40.70 WR	1	Great Britain; W 3:42.067	1st place, gold medalist(s)
Georgia Baker; Alexandra Manly; Sophie Edwards; Maeve Plouffe; Chloe Moran	Women's team pursuit	4:08.612	6 Q	France; L 4:09.975	7	7th–8th Place Match; Canada; W 4:11.548	7

Qualification legend: Q – Qualify to semifinal for gold medal; q – Qualify to classification semifinal; FA – Gold medal final; FB – Bronze medal final; FC – Fifth place final; FD – Seventh place final

Keirin

Athlete	Event	Round 1	Repechage	Quarterfinals	Semifinals	Final
Athlete	Event	Rank	Rank	Rank	Rank	Rank
Matthew Glaetzer	Men's keirin	1 QF	Bye	2 SF	2 F	3rd place, bronze medalist(s)
Matthew Richardson	Men's keirin	1 QF	Bye	1 SF	1 F	2nd place, silver medalist(s)
Kristina Clonan	Women's keirin	4 R	1 Q	6	Did not advance	
Chloe Moran	Women's keirin	6 R	4	Did not advance		

Omnium

Athlete	Event	Scratch race		Tempo race		Elimination race		Points race		Total	
Athlete	Event	Rank	Points	Rank	Points	Rank	Points	Rank	Points	Rank	Points
Sam Welsford	Men's omnium	14	14	18	6	5	32	14	0	14	52
Georgia Baker	Women's omnium	3	36	4	34	2	38	20	0	5	108

Madison

Athlete	Event	Sprint Points	Lap Points	Total Points	Rank
Kelland O'Brien; Sam Welsford	Men's madison	11	(−60)	(−49)	13
Georgia Baker; Alexandra Manly	Women's madison	6	0	6	9

=== Mountain biking ===
Australian mountain bikers secured one female quota place for the Olympics through the release of the final Olympic mountain biking rankings.

Athlete	Event	Time	Rank
Rebecca Henderson	Women's cross-country	1:32:44	13

=== BMX ===
Freestyle
Australian riders received a single quota spot in the men's and women's BMX freestyle for the games. The first quota is obtained at the men's event by virtue of the top three highest nation's at the 2023 UCI BMX Freestyle Park World Championships in Glasgow, Great Britain, while the second quota is obtained at the women's event by virtue of the highest continental representation, not yet qualified, at the 2022 UCI Urban Cycling World Championships in Abu Dhabi, United Arab Emirates.

Athlete	Event	Qualification				Final		
Athlete	Event	Run 1	Run 2	Average	Rank	Run 1	Run 2	Rank
Logan Martin	Men's freestyle	88.56	90.22	89.39	3 Q	64.40	~~33.40~~	9
Natalya Diehm	Women's freestyle	81.66	86.12	83.89	8 Q	88.80	~~87.70~~	3rd place, bronze medalist(s)

Race
Australian riders secured three quota places (one men's and three women's) in the race for Paris 2024 through the allocations of the final Olympic BMX ranking.

Athlete	Event	Quarterfinal		Last Chance Repechage		Semifinal		Final	
Athlete	Event	Points	Rank	Time	Rank	Points	Rank	Result	Rank
Izaac Kennedy	Men's	8	6 Q	Bye		13	8 Q	DNF	8
Lauren Reynolds	Women's	10	9 Q	Bye		15	10	Did not advance	
Saya Sakakibara	Women's	3	1 Q	Bye		3	1 Q	34.231	1st place, gold medalist(s)

== Diving ==
Australian divers secured nine quota place for Paris 2024, by advancing to the top twelve final of the men's individual platform and women's individual springboard at the 2023 World Aquatics Championships in Fukuoka, Japan; by virtue of gold medal results through 2023 Oceania Championships in Brisbane, Australia; and also by virtue top 12 individuals results and top 4 synchronized pair, not yet qualified, at the 2024 World Aquatics Championships in Doha, Qatar.

Men

Athlete	Event	Preliminary		Semifinal		Final	
Athlete	Event	Points	Rank	Points	Rank	Points	Rank
Kurtis Mathews	3 m springboard	399.20	8 Q	417.15	11 Q	383.40	10
Cassiel Rousseau	10 m platform	453.10	7 Q	469.25	4 Q	481.00	4
Jaxon Bowshire	10 m platform	390.30	14 Q	379.40	16	Did not advance	
Cassiel Rousseau; Domonic Bedggood	10 m synchronized platform	—N/a				394.74	6

Women

Athlete	Event	Preliminary		Semifinal		Final	
Athlete	Event	Points	Rank	Points	Rank	Points	Rank
Maddison Keeney	3 m springboard	337.35	2 Q	334.70	2 Q	343.10	2nd place, silver medalist(s)
Alysha Koloi	3 m springboard	276.60	16 Q	270.60	14	Did not advance	
Ellie Cole	10 m platform	290.00	9 Q	309.90	6 Q	333.30	7
Melissa Wu	10 m platform	285.20	13 Q	294.10	11 Q	278.30	11
Anabelle Smith; Maddison Keeney	3 m synchronized springboard	—N/a				292.20	5

== Equestrian ==
Australia fielded a full-squad of three equestrian riders into the team dressage, eventing and jumping competitions, respectively, by securing an outright berth each as the top-ranked nation from Southeast Asia and Oceania, vying for qualification, at the 2022 FEI World Championships in Herning, Denmark; one of two highest-ranked eligible nations at the International Equestrian Federation (FEI)-designated Olympic eventing qualifier for Group F and G (Africa, Middle East, Asia and Oceania) in Millstreet, Ireland; and one of two highest-ranked eligible nations at the International Equestrian Federation (FEI)-designated Olympic jumping qualifier for Group G in Valkenswaard, The Netherlands.

=== Dressage ===
Athlete	Horse	Event	Grand Prix		Grand Prix Special		Grand Prix Freestyle		Overall	
Athlete	Horse	Event	Score	Rank	Score	Rank	Technical	Artistic	Score	Rank
Jayden Brown	Quincy B	Individual	68.991	7	—N/a		Did not advance			
William Matthew	Mysterious Star	Individual	69.953	7	—N/a		Did not advance			
Simone Pearce	Destano	Individual	70.171	6	—N/a		Did not advance			
Jayden Brown; William Matthew; Simone Pearce	See above	Team	209.151	10 Q	207.203	10	—N/a			

Qualification Legend: Q = Qualified for the final based on position in group; q = Qualified for the final based on overall position

=== Eventing ===
Athlete	Horse	Event	Dressage		Cross-country			Jumping					
Athlete	Horse	Event	Dressage		Cross-country			Qualifier			Final		
Athlete	Horse	Event	Penalties	Rank	Penalties	Total	Rank	Penalties	Total	Rank	Penalties	Total	Rank
Chris Burton	Shadow Man	Individual	22.00	=3	0.00	22.00	3	0.40	22.40	2 Q	0.00	22.40	2nd place, silver medalist(s)
Shenae Lowings	Bold Venture	Individual	—N/a					29.20	—N/a				
Kevin McNab	Scuderia 1918 Don Quidam	Individual	34.90	41	Retired			—N/a					
Shane Rose	Virgil	Individual	34.60	38	2.80	37.40	23	4.40	41.80	22 Q	0.00	41.80	20
Chris Burton; Shenae Lowings; Kevin McNab; Shane Rose	See above	Team	91.50	8	202.80	294.30	15	34.00	328.30	15	—N/a		

=== Jumping ===
Athlete	Horse	Event	Qualification			Final			Jump-off		
Athlete	Horse	Event	Penalties	Time	Rank	Penalties	Time	Rank	Penalties	Time	Rank
Thaisa Erwin	Hialita B	Individual	8.00	78.12	51	Did not advance					
Hilary Scott	Oaks Milky Way	Individual	8.00	74.71	44	Did not advance					
Edwina Tops-Alexander	Fellow Castlefield	Individual	8.00	76.26	47	Did not advance					
Thaisa Erwin; Hilary Scott; Edwina Tops-Alexander	See above	Team	36	—N/a	15	Did not advance			—N/a		

== Field hockey ==
Summary

Key:

- FT – After full-time.
- P – Match decided by penalty-shootout.

Team	Event	Group stage						Quarterfinal	Semifinal	Final / BM	
Team	Event	Opposition Score	Opposition Score	Opposition Score	Opposition Score	Opposition Score	Rank	Opposition Score	Opposition Score	Opposition Score	Rank
Australia men's	Men's tournament	Argentina; W 1–0	Ireland; W 2–1	Belgium; L 2–6	New Zealand; W 5–0	India; L 2–3	3 Q	Netherlands; L 0–2	Did not advance		6
Australia women's	Women's tournament	South Africa; W 2–1	Great Britain; W 4–0	United States; W 3–0	Argentina; D 3–3	Spain; W 3–1	1 Q	China; L 2–3	Did not advance		5

=== Men's tournament ===
Australia men's national field hockey team qualified for the Olympics by virtue of the nation's gold medal results at the 2023 Oceania Cup in Whangārei, New Zealand.

Team roster Australia announced their squad on 8 July 2024.

Head coach: Colin Batch

No.	Pos.	Player	Date of birth (age)	Caps	Goals	Club
1	MF	Lachlan Sharp	2 July 1997 (aged 27)	101	20	(Australia) Zig Zag
2	FW	Thomas Craig	3 September 1995 (aged 28)	136	45	(Australia) Ryde Hunters Hill
3	DF	Corey Weyer	28 March 1996 (aged 28)	63	3	(Australia) Labrador
4	DF	Jake Harvie	5 March 1998 (aged 26)	139	5	(Australia) West Side Wolves
5	FW	Tom Wickham	26 May 1990 (aged 34)	108	49	(Australia) Waikerie
6	DF	Matthew Dawson	27 April 1994 (aged 30)	209	13	(Australia) Norths
7	FW	Nathan Ephraums	9 June 1999 (aged 25)	71	33	(Australia) Southern United
10	DF	Joshua Beltz	24 April 1995 (aged 29)	119	5	(Australia) Diamond Backs
11	DF	Eddie Ockenden	3 April 1987 (aged 37)	445	73	(Australia) North West Grads
12	MF	Jacob Whetton	16 May 1991 (aged 33)	277	80	(Australia) Brisbane Blaze
13	FW	Blake Govers	6 July 1996 (aged 28)	161	147	(Australia) Reds
17	MF	Aran Zalewski (Captain)	21 March 1991 (aged 33)	261	35	(Australia) Reds
20	MF	Ky Willott	15 March 2001 (aged 23)	51	14	(Australia) North Newcastle
22	MF	Flynn Ogilvie	17 September 1993 (aged 30)	169	29	(Australia) University of Wollongong
29	FW	Tim Brand	29 November 1998 (aged 25)	97	35	(Australia) Ryde Hunters Hill
30	GK	Andrew Charter	30 March 1987 (aged 37)	245	0	(Australia) Central
32	DF	Jeremy Hayward	3 March 1993 (aged 31)	227	120	(Australia) Waratahs

Group play

Pos	Team	Pld	W	D	L	GF	GA	GD	Pts	Qualification
1	Belgium	5	4	1	0	15	7	+8	13	Advance to quarter-finals
2	India	5	3	1	1	10	7	+3	10	Advance to quarter-finals
3	Australia	5	3	0	2	12	10	+2	9	Advance to quarter-finals
4	Argentina	5	2	2	1	8	6	+2	8	Advance to quarter-finals
5	Ireland	5	1	0	4	4	9	−5	3	
6	New Zealand	5	0	0	5	4	14	−10	0	

Source: FIH
Rules for classification: 1) points; 2) matches won; 3) goal difference; 4) goals for; 5) head-to-head result; 6) field goals scored.

27 July 2024
13:15
v

Australia	1–0	Argentina
Govers 30+'	Report

Pitch 2
Umpires:
Coen van Bunge (NED)
Ben Göntgen (GER)

29 July 2024
10:00
v

Ireland	1–2	Australia
Cole 25'	Report	Weyer 9'; Govers 30'

Pitch 1
Umpires:
Sarah Wilson (GBR)
Jonas van 't Hek (NED)

30 July 2024
19:45
v

Australia	2–6	Belgium
Sharp 28'; Govers 44'	Report	Hendrickx 7'; Boon 15', 30', 57'; Van Aubel 35'; Kina 38'

Pitch 1
Umpires:
Marcin Grochal (POL)
Gareth Greenfield (NZL)

1 August 2024
10:30
v

New Zealand	0–5	Australia
	Report	Wickham 22'; Govers 25', 52', 57'; Willott 42'

Pitch 2
Umpires:
Lim Hong Zhen (SGP)
Gabriel Labate (ARG)

2 August 2024
13:15
v

Australia	2–3	India
Craig 25'; Govers 55'	Report	Abhishek 12'; Harmanpreet 13', 32'

Pitch 2
Umpires:
Jonas van 't Hek (NED)
Gabriel Labate (ARG)

Quarterfinal

4 August 2024
17:30
v

Netherlands	2–0	Australia
Telgenkamp 35'; Van Dam 52'	Report

Pitch 1
Umpires:
Dan Barstow (GBR)
Gareth Greenfield (NZL)

=== Women's tournament ===
Australia women's national field hockey team qualified for the Olympics following the triumph of the nation's gold medal results at the 2023 Oceania Cup in Whangārei, New Zealand.

Team roster The squad was announced on 1 July 2024.

Head coach: Katrina Powell

No.	Pos.	Player	Date of birth (age)	Caps	Goals	Club
1	DF	Claire Colwill	19 September 2003 (aged 20)	56	5	(Australia) Brisbane Blaze
3	MF	Brooke Peris	16 January 1993 (aged 31)	208	40	(Australia) Adelaide Fire
4	MF	Amy Lawton	19 January 2002 (aged 22)	79	4	(Netherlands) Hurley
5	MF	Grace Young	23 August 2002 (aged 21)	34	0	(Australia) NSW Pride
6	DF	Penny Squibb	9 February 1993 (aged 31)	56	6	(Australia) Perth Thundersticks
8	MF	Maddison Brooks	23 September 2004 (aged 19)	32	6	(Australia) OHA
11	FW	Alice Arnott	25 February 1998 (aged 26)	22		
13	DF	Hattie Shand	11 January 2000 (aged 24)	52		
14	MF	Stephanie Kershaw	19 April 1995 (aged 29)	120	21	(Australia) Brisbane Blaze
15	MF	Kaitlin Nobbs (captain)	24 September 1997 (aged 26)	135	10	(Australia) NSW Pride
18	MF	Jane Claxton (captain)	26 October 1992 (aged 31)	246	21	(Australia) Adelaide Fire
19	GK	Jocelyn Bartram	4 May 1993 (aged 31)	107	0	(Australia) NSW Pride
20	DF	Karri Somerville	7 April 1999 (aged 25)	53	0	(Australia) Perth Thundersticks
21	MF	Renee Taylor	28 September 1996 (aged 27)	132	15	(Australia) Brisbane Blaze
22	DF	Tatum Stewart	22 February 2002 (aged 22)	30	6	(Australia) Brisbane Blaze
24	MF	Mariah Williams	31 May 1995 (aged 29)	132	20	(Australia) NSW Pride
29	MF	Rebecca Greiner	13 June 1999 (aged 25)	74	9	(Australia) Brisbane Blaze
30	FW	Grace Stewart (captain)	28 April 1997 (aged 27)	124	36	(Australia) NSW Pride

Group play

Pos	Team	Pld	W	D	L	GF	GA	GD	Pts	Qualification
1	Australia	5	4	1	0	15	5	+10	13	Quarter-finals
2	Argentina	5	4	1	0	16	7	+9	13	Quarter-finals
3	Spain	5	2	1	2	6	7	−1	7	Quarter-finals
4	Great Britain	5	2	0	3	8	12	−4	6	Quarter-finals
5	United States	5	1	1	3	5	13	−8	4	
6	South Africa	5	0	0	5	4	10	−6	0	

Source: FIH
Rules for classification: 1) points; 2) matches won; 3) goal difference; 4) goals for; 5) head-to-head result; 6) field goals scored.

28 July 2024
12:45
v

Australia	2–1	South Africa
Kershaw 16'; T. Stewart 40'	Report	De Waal 14'

Pitch 1
Umpires:
Emi Yamada (JPN)
Rachel Williams (GBR)

29 July 2024
17:00
v

Great Britain	0–4	Australia
	Report	Greiner 17'; Arnott 19'; T. Stewart 46'; G. Stewart 52'

Pitch 1
Umpires:
Alison Keogh (IRE)
Irene Presenqui (ARG)

31 July 2024
13:15
v

Australia	3–0	United States
Taylor 3'; Arnott 29'; Brooks 53'	Report

Pitch 2
Umpires:
Liu Xiaoying (CHN)
Rachel Williams (GBR)

1 August 2024
20:15
v

Argentina	3–3	Australia
Casas 10'; Sauze 10'; Granatto 50'	Report	Nobbs 37'; Kershaw 45+'; Williams 60'

Pitch 2
Umpires:
Wanri Venter (RSA)
Amber Church (NZL)

3 August 2024
12:45
v

Australia	3–1	Spain
Arnott 2'; Kershaw 55'; Nobbs 59'	Report	Riera 43'

Pitch 1
Umpires:
Ayanna McClean (TTO)
Amber Church (NZL)

Quarterfinal

5 August 2024
10:00
v

Australia	2–3	China
Arnott 10'; T. Stewart 45'	Report	Ma 11'; Dan 20'; Zhong 35'

Pitch 1
Umpires:
Annelize Rostron (RSA)
Wanri Venter (RSA)

== Football ==
Summary

Key:

- A.E.T – After extra time.
- P – Match decided by penalty-shootout.

Team	Event	Group Stage				Quarterfinal	Semifinal	Final / BM	
Team	Event	Opposition Score	Opposition Score	Opposition Score	Rank	Opposition Score	Opposition Score	Opposition Score	Rank
Australia women's	Women's tournament	Germany; L 0–3	Zambia; W 6–5	United States; L 1–2	3	Did not advance			9

=== Women's tournament ===
Australia women's football team qualified for the Olympics by winning the third round 2-legged tie of the 2024 AFC Women's Olympic Qualifying Tournament in Tashkent, Uzbekistan, and in Melbourne 13–0 on aggregate.

Team roster Australia named a squad of 18 players and 4 alternates for the tournament on 4 June 2024.

Head coach: (Sweden) Tony Gustavsson

No.	Pos.	Player	Date of birth (age)	Caps	Goals	Club
1	GK	Mackenzie Arnold	25 February 1994 (aged 30)	49	0	(The Football Association) West Ham United
2	FW	Michelle Heyman	4 July 1988 (aged 36)	66	26	(Football Australia) Canberra United
3	DF	Kaitlyn Torpey	17 March 2000 (aged 24)	5	1	(United States Soccer Federation) San Diego Wave
4	DF	Clare Polkinghorne	1 February 1989 (aged 35)	167	16	(Swedish Football Association) Kristianstad
5	FW	Cortnee Vine	9 April 1998 (aged 26)	29	3	(Football Australia) Sydney FC
6	MF	Katrina Gorry	13 August 1992 (aged 31)	107	17	(The Football Association) West Ham United
7	DF	Steph Catley (interim captain)	26 January 1994 (aged 30)	126	5	(The Football Association) Arsenal
8	MF	Kyra Cooney-Cross	15 February 2002 (aged 22)	45	0	(The Football Association) Arsenal
9	FW	Caitlin Foord	11 November 1994 (aged 29)	123	36	(The Football Association) Arsenal
10	MF	Emily van Egmond	12 July 1993 (aged 31)	144	31	(United States Soccer Federation) San Diego Wave
11	MF	Mary Fowler	14 February 2003 (aged 21)	53	15	(The Football Association) Manchester City
12	DF	Ellie Carpenter	28 April 2000 (aged 24)	77	4	(French Football Federation) Lyon
13	MF	Tameka Yallop	16 June 1991 (aged 33)	123	13	(Football Australia) Brisbane Roar
14	DF	Alanna Kennedy	21 January 1995 (aged 29)	124	9	(The Football Association) Manchester City
15	DF	Clare Hunt	12 March 1999 (aged 25)	20	0	(French Football Federation) Paris Saint-Germain
16	FW	Hayley Raso	5 September 1994 (aged 29)	87	18	(Royal Spanish Football Federation) Real Madrid
17	MF	Clare Wheeler	14 January 1998 (aged 26)	21	2	(The Football Association) Everton
18	GK	Teagan Micah	20 October 1997 (aged 26)	17	0	(The Football Association) Liverpool
19	FW	Sharn Freier	24 July 2001 (aged 23)	2	0	(Football Australia) Brisbane Roar

Group play

Pos	Team	Pld	W	D	L	GF	GA	GD	Pts	Qualification
1	United States	3	3	0	0	9	2	+7	9	Advance to knockout stage
2	Germany	3	2	0	1	8	5	+3	6	Advance to knockout stage
3	Australia	3	1	0	2	7	10	−3	3	
4	Zambia	3	0	0	3	6	13	−7	0	

Source: FIFA
Rules for classification: Group stage tiebreakers
25 July 2024
19:00

Germany	3–0	Australia
Hegering 24'; Schüller 64'; Brand 68'	Report

Stade de Marseille, Marseille
Attendance: 9,731
Referee: Katia García (Mexico)

28 July 2024
19:00

Australia	6–5	Zambia
Kennedy 7'; Raso 35'; Musole 58' (o.g.); Catley 65', 78' (pen.); Heyman 90'	Report	B. Banda 1', 33', 45+2'; Kundananji 21', 56'

Stade de Nice, Nice
Attendance: 4,441
Referee: Emikar Calderas (Venezuela)

31 July 2024
19:00

Australia	1–2	United States
Kennedy 90+2'	Report	Rodman 43'; Albert 77'

Stade de Marseille, Marseille
Attendance: 13,036
Referee: François Letexier (France)

== Golf ==
Australia entered four golfers into the Olympic tournament. All of them qualified directly to Paris 2024, based on their respective ranking performances in the top 60 on the IGF World Rankings.

Athlete	Event	Round 1	Round 2	Round 3	Round 4	Total		
Athlete	Event	Score	Score	Score	Score	Score	Par	Rank
Jason Day	Men's	69	68	67	68	272	−12	T9
Min Woo Lee	Men's	76	65	68	68	277	−7	T22
Hannah Green	Women's	77	70	66	69	282	−6	T4
Minjee Lee	Women's	71	74	71	71	287	−1	T22

== Gymnastics ==
=== Artistic ===
Australia fielded a squad of five female gymnasts and one male gymnast for Paris. All of the female gymnasts qualified for the games after advancing to the final round of team all-around and obtained one of nine available team spots for nations not yet qualified at the 2023 World Championships in Antwerp, Belgium. Later on, Jesse Moore qualified for the games after becoming the highest rank eligible gymnast through the 2024 Oceanian Championships in Auckland, New Zealand.

Men

Athlete	Event	Qualification								Final							
Athlete	Event	Apparatus						Total	Rank	Apparatus						Total	Rank
Athlete	Event	F	PH	R	V	PB	HB	Total	Rank	F	PH	R	V	PB	HB	Total	Rank
Jesse Moore	Individual all-around	13.966	13.700	13.033	14.233	14.200	13.566	82.698	15 Q	12.533	14.466	12.866	14.333	13.866	12.366	80.430	21

Women

Athlete	Event	Qualification						Final					
Athlete	Event	Apparatus				Total	Rank	Apparatus				Total	Rank
Athlete	Event	V	UB	BB	F	Total	Rank	V	UB	BB	F	Total	Rank
Kate McDonald	Team	—N/a	13.633	13.033	~~12.100~~	—N/a		Did not advance					
Emma Nedov	Team	~~13.200~~	12.766	~~11.800~~	12.333	50.099	51	Did not advance					
Ruby Pass	Team	13.350	13.900	13.300	12.866	53.866	14 Q	13.633	13.733	13.466	12.966	53.798	13
Breanna Scott	Team	13.300	—N/a	13.700	—N/a			Did not advance					
Emily Whitehead	Team	13.600	~~12.333~~	—N/a	12.733	—N/a		Did not advance					
Total	Team	40.700	40.299	40.033	37.932	158.694	10	Did not advance					

=== Rhythmic ===
Following the 2024 Oceania Rhythmic Gymnastics Championships that doubled with European Championships in Budapest, Hungary, International Gymnastics Federation announced Alexandra Kiroi-Bogatyreva as Rhythmic Gymnastics Individual qualifier and Australian Group, known as "Aspire Senior Group", as Rhythmic Gymnastics Group qualifier.

Athlete	Event	Qualification						Final					
Athlete	Event	Hoop	Ball	Clubs	Ribbon	Total	Rank	Hoop	Ball	Clubs	Ribbon	Total	Rank
Alexandra Kiroi-Bogatyreva	Individual	30.050	28.550	26.850	28.900	114.350	22	Did not advance					

Athletes	Event	Qualification				Final			
Athletes	Event	5 apps	3+2 apps	Total	Rank	5 apps.	3+2 apps	Total	Rank
Saskia Broedelet; Emmanouela Frroku; Lidiia Iakovleva; Phoebe Learmont; Jessica Weintraub	Group	31.400	27.050	58.450	11	Did not advance			

=== Trampoline ===
Australia qualified one gymnast for the men's trampoline competition in Paris through the reallocated continental quota (one of the quotas not used by another continent).

Athlete	Event	Qualification		Final	
Athlete	Event	Score	Rank	Score	Rank
Brock Batty	Men's	55.890	13	Did not advance	

== Judo ==
Australia has qualified three judokas (one man and two women) via the IJF World Ranking List and continental quotas in Oceania.

Athlete	Event	Round of 64	Round of 32	Round of 16	Quarterfinals	Semifinals	Repechage	Final / BM	
Athlete	Event	Opposition Result	Opposition Result	Opposition Result	Opposition Result	Opposition Result	Opposition Result	Opposition Result	Rank
Josh Katz	Men's −60 kg	—N/a	Carlino (ITA); L 00–01	Did not advance					
Katharina Haecker	Women's −63 kg	—N/a	Renshall (GBR); L 01–11	Did not advance					
Aoife Coughlan	Women's −70 kg	—N/a	Gercsák (HUN); W 01–00	Butkereit (GER); L 00–10	Did not advance				

== Modern pentathlon ==
Athlete	Event		Fencing (épée one touch)				Swimming (200 m freestyle)			Riding (show jumping)			Combined: shooting/running (10 m laser pistol)/(3000 m)			Total points	Final rank
Athlete	Event		RR	BR	Rank	MP points	Time	Rank	MP points	Penalties	Rank	MP points	Time	Rank	MP points	Total points	Final rank
Genevieve van Rensburg	Women's	Semifinal	215	4	15	219	2:11.61	3	287	27	16	273	12:37.73	17	543	1322	13
Genevieve van Rensburg	Women's	Final	Did not advance														

== Rowing ==
Australian rowers qualified boats in each of the following classes through the 2023 World Rowing Championships in Belgrade, Serbia.

Men

Athlete	Event	Heats		Repechage		Quarterfinals		Semifinals		Final	
Athlete	Event	Time	Rank	Time	Rank	Time	Rank	Time	Rank	Time	Rank
Patrick Holt; Simon Keenan	Pair	6:36.71	4 R	6:53.40	4	—N/a		Did not advance			
Fergus Hamilton; Alexander Hill; Timothy Masters; Jack Robertson	Four	6:06.84	2 FA	Bye		—N/a				6:00.35	6
Kendall Brodie (Cox); Ben Canham; Angus Dawson; Jack Hargreaves; Joshua Hicks; Joseph O'Brien; Alexander Purnell; Spencer Turrin; Angus Widdicombe; Jackson Kench (Reserve)	Eight	5:42.07	2 R	5:31.50	4 FA	—N/a				5:31.79	6

Women

Athlete	Event	Heats		Repechage		Quarterfinals		Semifinals		Final	
Athlete	Event	Time	Rank	Time	Rank	Time	Rank	Time	Rank	Time	Rank
Tara Rigney	Single sculls	7:30.71	1 QF	Bye		7:30.57	1 SA/B	7:23.58	2 FA	7:21.38	4
Annabelle McIntyre; Jessica Morrison	Pair	7:16.58	1 SA/B	Bye		—N/a		7:14.14	1 FA	7:03.54	3rd place, bronze medalist(s)
Amanda Bateman; Harriet Hudson	Double sculls	6:49.21	2 SA/B	Bye		—N/a		6:52.69	4 FB	6:47.66	7
Olympia Aldersey; Lily Alton; Molly Goodman; Jean Mitchell	Four	6:59.86	4 R	6:43.70	5 FB	—N/a				6:39.28	9
Caitlin Cronin; Laura Gourley; Rowena Meredith; Ria Thompson; Kathryn Rowan (Reserve)	Quadruple sculls	6:25.88	5 R	6:32.65	3 FB	—N/a				6:30.85	8
Paige Barr; Bronwyn Cox; Sarah Hawe; Giorgia Patten; Georgina Rowe; Lucy Stephan; Jacqueline Swick; Hayley Verbunt (Cox); Katrina Werry; Samantha Morton (Reserve)	Eight	6:18.61	2 R	6:06.09	3 FA	—N/a				6:00.73	4

Qualification Legend: FA=Final A (medal); FB=Final B (non-medal); FC=Final C (non-medal); FD=Final D (non-medal); FE=Final E (non-medal); FF=Final F (non-medal); SA/B=Semifinals A/B; SC/D=Semifinals C/D; SE/F=Semifinals E/F; QF=Quarterfinals; R=Repechage

== Rugby sevens ==
Summary

Team	Event	Pool round				Quarterfinal	Semifinal	Final / BM	
Team	Event	Opposition Result	Opposition Result	Opposition Result	Rank	Opposition Result	Opposition Result	Opposition Result	Rank
Australia men's	Men's tournament	Samoa; W 21–14	Kenya; W 21–7	Argentina; W 22–14	1 Q	United States; W 18–0	Fiji; L 7–31	Bronze medal match South Africa; L 19–26	4
Australia women's	Women's tournament	South Africa; W 34–5	Great Britain; W 36–5	Ireland; W 19–14	1 Q	Ireland; W 40–7	Canada; L 12–21	Bronze medal match United States; L 12–14	4

=== Men's tournament ===
Australia national rugby sevens team qualified for the Olympics by securing a fifth-place finish and the last of four available slots in the 2022–23 World Rugby Sevens Series, thumping Great Britain in a seventh-place playoff at the London leg.

Team roster Australia's squad of 12 players was named on 2 July 2024. Additionally, Michael Icely and Josh Turner were named as traveling reserves.

Head coach: John Manenti

No.	Player	Date of birth (age)
1	Henry Hutchison	12 February 1997 (aged 27)
2	Ben Dowling	5 March 2002 (aged 22)
3	Corey Toole	7 March 2000 (aged 24)
4	Dietrich Roache	6 July 2001 (aged 23)
5	Mark Nawaqanitawase	11 September 2000 (aged 23)
6	Henry Paterson	26 February 1997 (aged 27)
7	Hayden Sargeant	11 March 1998 (aged 26)
8	James Turner	29 August 1998 (aged 25)
9	Matt Gonzalez	1 June 1994 (aged 30)
10	Nick Malouf (c)	19 March 1993 (aged 31)
11	Maurice Longbottom	30 January 1995 (aged 29)
12	Nathan Lawson	23 January 1999 (aged 25)

Group stage

Pos	Team	Pld	W	D	L	PF	PA	PD	Pts	Qualification
1	Australia	3	3	0	0	64	35	+29	9	Advance to Quarter-finals
2	Argentina	3	2	0	1	73	46	+27	7	Advance to Quarter-finals
3	Samoa	3	1	0	2	52	49	+3	5	
4	Kenya	3	0	0	3	19	78	−59	3	

Source: World Rugby
Rules for classification: 1) Points; 2) Head-to-head result; 3) Point difference; 4) Points scored.

24 July 2024
15:30

Australia	21–14	Samoa
Try: Hutchison (2) 8' c, 14' c Lawson 11' c Con: Roache (3/3) 8', 11', 14'	World Rugby	Try: Opetai 3' c Falaniko 15' c Con: Scanlan (1/1) 3'; Maiava (1/1) 15'

Stade de France, Paris
Attendance: 69,000
Referee: Jérémy Rozier (France)

24 July 2024
19:00

Australia	21–7	Kenya
Try: Turner 1' c Lawson 6' c Toole 13' c Con: Roache (3/3) 1', 7', 13'	World Rugby	Try: Mboya 3' c Con: Mboya (1/1) 3'

Stade de France, Paris
Attendance: 69,000
Referee: Paulo Duarte (Portugal)

25 July 2024
14:30

Argentina	14–22	Australia
Try: Schulz 2' c Osadczuk 11' c Con: Pellandini (2/2) 2', 11'	World Rugby	Try: Hutchison 7' m Dowling 8' m Roache 9' m Malouf 13' c Con: Roache (1/4) 13'

Stade de France, Paris
Attendance: 70,000
Referee: Adam Leal (England)

Quarterfinal

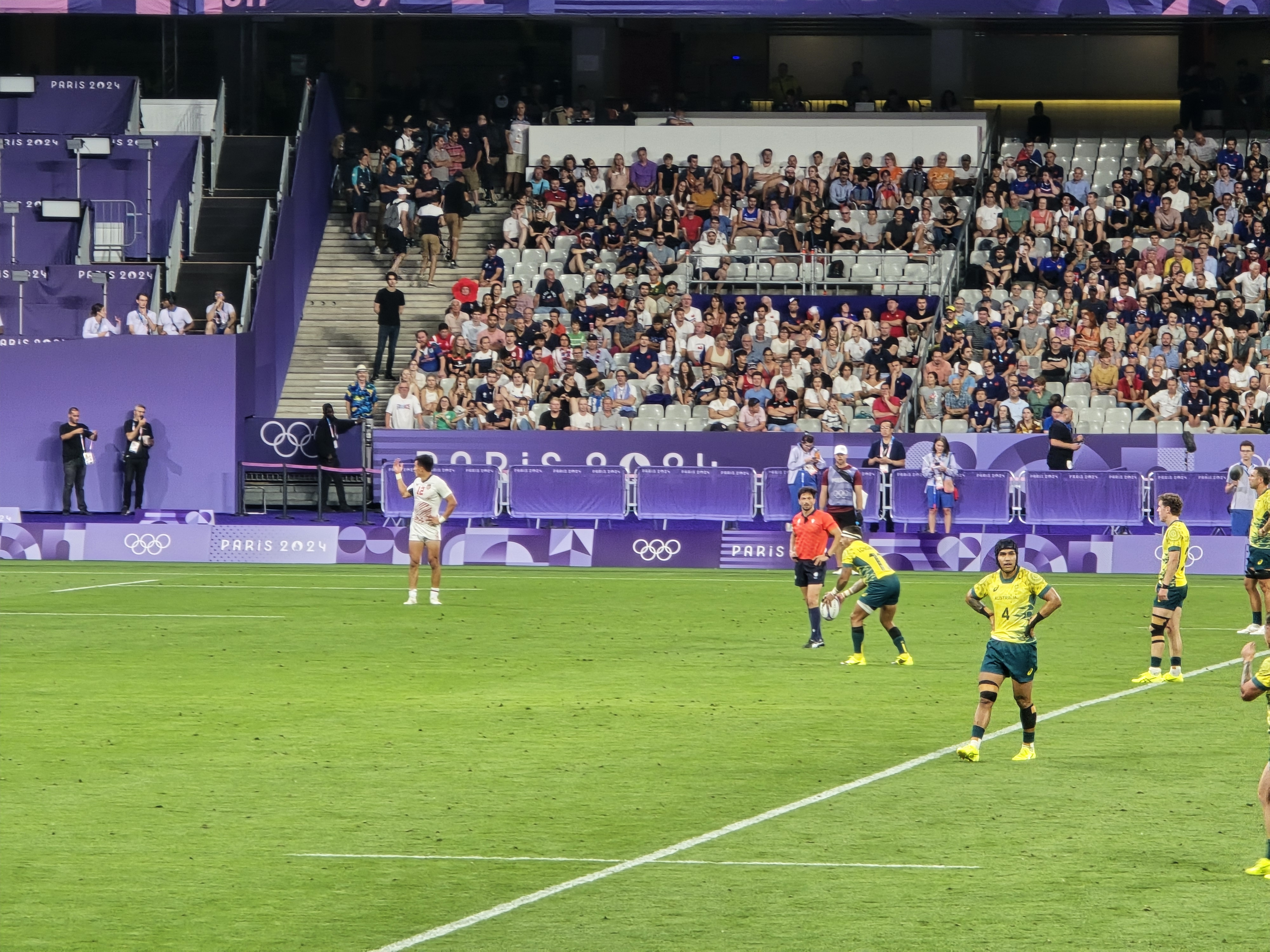
Australia take a penalty against the United States

25 July 2024
22:30

Australia	18–0	United States
Try: Turner 5' m Toole 13' m Longbottom 15' m Pen: Longbottom (1/1) 14'	World Rugby

Stade de France, Paris
Attendance: 70,000
Referee: Jérémy Rozier (France)

Semifinal

27 July 2024
16:00

Fiji	31–7	Australia
Try: Nasova 8' c Baleiwairiki 8' c Rasaku 11' c Ravutaumada 14' c Con: Teba (2/2) 8', 9'; Nacuqu (2/2) 15'; Pen: Veilawa (1/1) 14'	World Rugby	Try: Dowling 6' c Con: Roache (1/1) 6'

Stade de France, Paris
Referee: AJ Jacobs (South Africa)

Bronze medal match

27 July 2024
19:00

(bronze) South Africa	26–19	Australia
Try: S. Davids 6' m Z. Davids (2) 10' c, 11' c Williams 15' c Con: Leyds (2/3) 10', 11'; Soyizwapi (1/1) 15'	World Rugby	Try: Lawson 5' c Toole 12' c Paterson 14' m Con: Roache (2/3) 5', 13'

Stade de France, Paris
Referee: Jérémy Rozier (France)

=== Women's tournament ===
Australia women's national rugby sevens team qualified for the Olympics by advancing to the quarterfinal phase of the Hong Kong leg and securing a top-four placement in the 2022–23 World Rugby Women's Sevens Series.

Team roster Australia's squad of 12 players was named on 2 July 2024. Additionally, Kahli Henwood and Sidney Taylor were named as traveling reserves.

Head coach: Tim Walsh

- Bienne Terita
- Sharni Smale
- Faith Nathan
- Dominique Du Toit
- Teagan Levi
- Sariah Paki
- Charlotte Caslick (c)
- Kaitlin Shave
- Tia Hinds
- Isabella Nasser
- Maddison Levi
- Bridget Clark

Group stage

Pos	Team	Pld	W	D	L	PF	PA	PD	Pts	Qualification
1	Australia	3	3	0	0	89	24	+65	9	Quarter-finals
2	(United Kingdom) Great Britain	3	2	0	1	52	65	−13	7	Quarter-finals
3	(Republic of Ireland) Ireland	3	1	0	2	64	40	+24	5	Quarter-finals
4	South Africa	3	0	0	3	22	98	−76	3	

Source: World Rugby
Rules for classification: 1) Points; 2) Head-to-head result; 3) Point difference; 4) Points scored.

28 July 2024
16:00

Australia	34–5	South Africa
Try: M. Levi (4) 1' c, 6' c, 8' m, 10' m Nathan 4' m T. Levi 8' m Con: Hinds (2/6) 2', 7'	World Rugby	Try: Roos 16' m

Stade de France, Paris
Referee: Lavenia Rawaca (Fiji)

28 July 2024
19:30

Australia	36–5	Great Britain
Try: M. Levi (3) 3' c, 7' m, 10' m Terita (2) 8' c, 10' c T. Levi 14' m Con: Hinds (2/3) 3', 10'; T. Levi (1/3) 10'	World Rugby	Try: Cowell 2' m

Stade de France, Paris
Referee: Maria Latos (Germany)

29 July 2024
14:30

Australia	19–14	Ireland
Try: Nathan 1' c T. Levi 8' m M. Levi 9' c Con: T. Levi (1/2) 1'; Hinds (1/1) 10'	World Rugby	Try: Higgins (2) 6' c, 14' c Con: Higgins (2/2) 6', 14'

Stade de France, Paris
Referee: George Selwood (England/Great Britain)

Quarterfinal

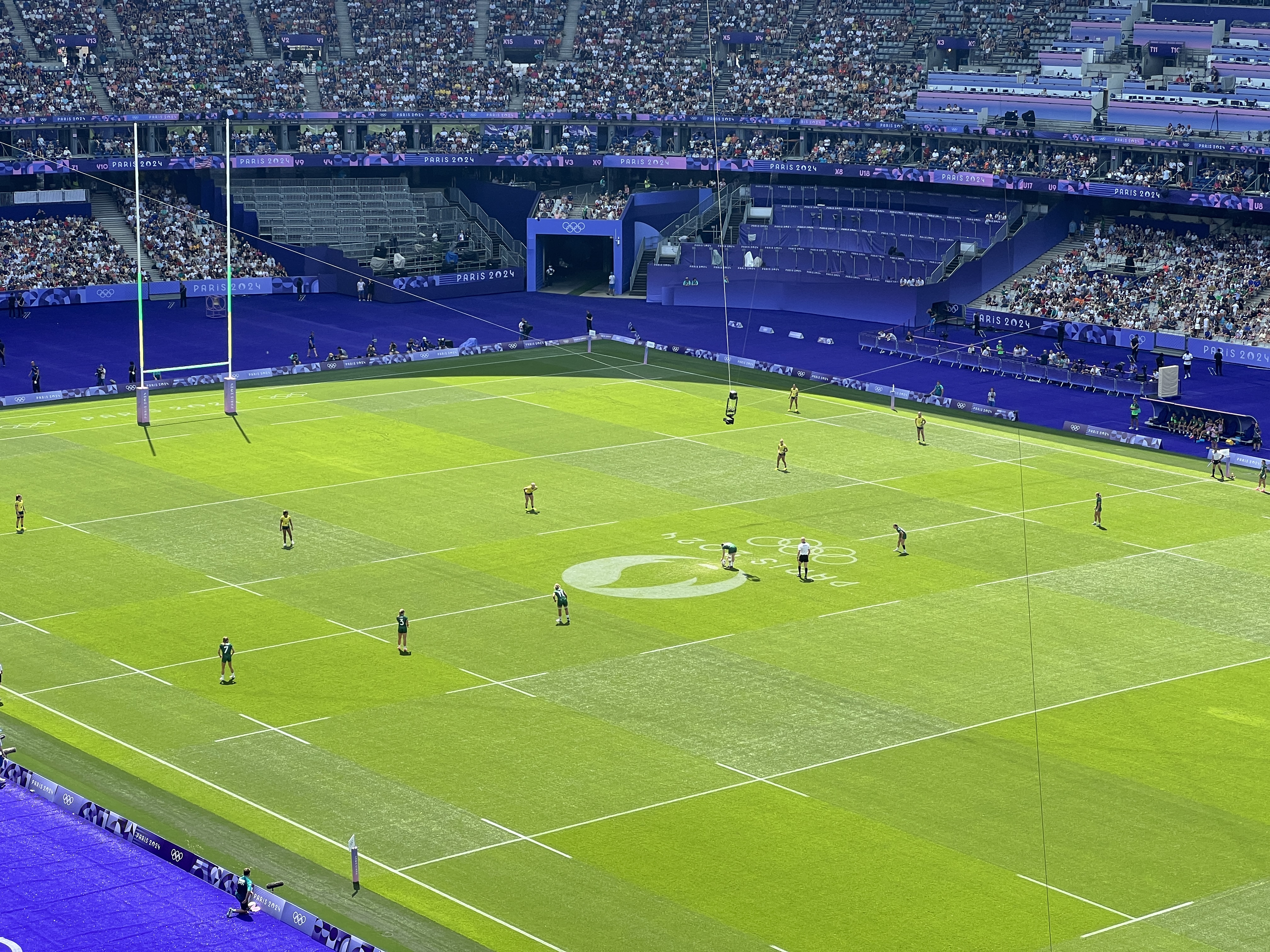
Australia vs Ireland kickoff

29 July 2024
22:30

Australia	40–7	Ireland
Try: M. Levi (3) 1' m, 4' c, 6' c Nathan 7' c Nasser 9' c Terita 14' c Con: Hinds (4/5) 4', 6', 7', 9'; Du Toit (1/1) 15'	World Rugby	Try: Flood 7' c Con: Higgins (1/1) 12'

Stade de France, Paris
Referee: Finlay Brown (Scotland/Great Britain)

Semifinal

30 July 2024
16:00

Canada	21–12	Australia
Try: Williams 8' c Hogan-Rochester 10' c Logan 13' c Con: Apps (3/3) 8', 10', 13'	World Rugby	Try: M. Levi 1' c Paki 4' m Con: Hinds (1/2) 2'

Stade de France, Paris
Referee: George Selwood (England/Great Britain)

Bronze medal match

30 July 2024
19:00

United States	14–12	Australia
Try: Kelter 6' c Sedrick 15' c Con: Kelter (1/1) 7', Sedrick (1/1) 15' c	World Rugby	Try: M. Levi (2) 2' c, 13' m Con: Hinds (1/2) 2'

Stade de France, Paris
Referee: Craig Chan (Hong Kong)

== Sailing ==
Australian sailors qualified one boat in each of the following classes through the 2023 Sailing World Championships in The Hague, Netherlands, and 2023 Sail Sydney in Sydney.

Elimination events

Athlete	Event	Opening series																						Quarterfinal	Semifinal								Final							
Athlete	Event	1	2	3	4	5	6	7	8	9	10	11	12	13	14	15	16	17	18	19	20	Net points	Rank	Rank	1	2	3	4	5	6	Total	Rank	1	2	3	4	5	6	Total	Rank
Grae Morris	Men's IQFoil	~~13~~	~~DNS~~	10	9	1	7	2	1	9	2	4	7	8	Cancelled							60	1 F	Bye	—N/a							Bye	—N/a							2nd place, silver medalist(s)
Breiana Whitehead	Women's Formula Kite	~~12~~	5	7	6	9	8	Cancelled										—N/a				35	7 SF	—N/a	4	—N/a					0	4	Did not advance							

Qualification legend: QF – Qualify to quarterfinal; SF – Qualify to semifinal; F – Qualify to final

Medal race events

Athlete	Event	Race													Net points	Final rank
Athlete	Event	1	2	3	4	5	6	7	8	9	10	11	12	M*	Net points	Final rank
Matthew Wearn	Men's ILCA 7	12	2	1	~~18~~	1	2	10	10	Cancelled		—N/a		2	40	1st place, gold medalist(s)
Jim Colley; Shaun Connor	Men's 49er	19	17	10	14	10	9	12	3	10	3	16	~~20~~	EL	123	14
Zoe Thomson	Women's ILCA 6	12	~~37~~	22	11	16	6	19	35	15	Can	—N/a		EL	136	20
Evie Haseldine; Olivia Price	Women's 49erFX	6	8	16	7	11	3	~~20~~	10	9	10	10	12	18	120	9
Conor Nicholas; Nia Jerwood	Mixed 470	6	~~UFD~~	7	7	3	16	8	15	cancelled		—N/a		12	74	9
Rhiannan Brown; Brin Liddell	Mixed Nacra 17	11	11	13	13	12	7	9	12	13	6	14	~~20~~	EL	121	13

Key: M – Medal race; EL – Eliminated, did not advance into the medal race

== Shooting ==
Australian shooters achieved quota places for the following events based on their results at the 2022 and 2023 ISSF World Championships, 2023 and 2024 Oceania Championships, and 2024 ISSF World Olympic Qualification Tournament. They must compete in two selection meets of the Australia Cup to attain their benchmark scores and assure their selection to the Olympic team.

Men

Athlete	Event	Qualification		Final	
Athlete	Event	Points	Rank	Points	Rank
Jack Rossiter	10 m air rifle	628.5	16	Did not advance	
Dane Sampson	10 m air rifle	626.9	30	Did not advance	
Jack Rossiter	50 m rifle 3 positions	585	27	Did not advance	
Dane Sampson	50 m rifle 3 positions	581	34	Did not advance	
Sergei Evglevski	25 m rapid fire pistol	573-14x	26	Did not advance	
Mitchell Iles	Trap	122 (+3)	9	Did not advance	
James Willett	Trap	123 (+1)	3 Q	19	6
Joshua Bell	Skeet	116	25	Did not advance	

Women

Athlete	Event	Qualification		Final	
Athlete	Event	Points	Rank	Points	Rank
Elena Galiabovitch	10 m air pistol	564	37	Did Not Advance	
Elena Galiabovitch	25 m pistol	569-13x	35	Did not advance	
Catherine Skinner	Trap	116	17	Did not advance	
Penny Smith	Trap	121 (+2)	6 Q	32	3rd place, bronze medalist(s)
Aislin Jones	Skeet	112	25	Did not advance	

Mixed

Athlete	Event	Qualification		Final / BM	
Athlete	Event	Points	Rank	Opposition Result	Rank
Joshua Bell; Aislin Jones	Skeet team	141	11	Did not advance	

== Skateboarding ==
Australia entered nine skateboarders (four males and five females) to compete in each of the following events at the Games.

Men

Athlete	Event	Qualification		Final	
Athlete	Event	Score	Rank	Score	Rank
Keegan Palmer	Park	93.78	1 Q	93.11	1st place, gold medalist(s)
Kieran Woolley	Park	80.04	16	Did not advance	
Keefer Wilson	Park	90.10	5 Q	58.36	8
Shane O'Neill	Street	107.50	15	Did not advance	

Women

Athlete	Event	Qualification		Final	
Athlete	Event	Score	Rank	Score	Rank
Arisa Trew	Park	82.95	6 Q	93.18	1st place, gold medalist(s)
Ruby Trew	Park	77.89	11	Did not advance	
Chloe Covell	Street	246.73	4 Q	70.33	8
Liv Lovelace	Street	118.10	21	Did not advance	
Haylie Powell	Street	125.30	20	Did not advance	

== Sport climbing ==
Australia entered two sport climbers into the Olympic tournament. Oceana Mackenzie and Campbell Harrison qualified directly for the women's and men's boulder & lead combined events, by winning the gold medal at the 2023 Oceania Olympic Qualifier in Melbourne, Australia.

Boulder & lead combined

Athlete	Event	Qualification						Final					
Athlete	Event	Boulder		Lead		Total	Rank	Boulder		Lead		Total	Rank
Athlete	Event	Result	Rank	Result	Rank	Total	Rank	Result	Rank	Result	Rank	Total	Rank
Campbell Harrison	Men's	9.4	=19	14.0	13	23.4	19	Did not advance					
Oceana Mackenzie	Women's	79.6	4	45.1	14	124.7	6 Q	59.7	3	45.1	7	104.8	7

== Surfing ==
Australian surfers confirmed four shortboard quota places (two male and two female) for Tahiti. Ethan Ewing, Jack Robinson, Tyler Wright and Molly Picklum finished among the top ten (men) and top eight (women) of those eligible for qualification in their respective shortboard races based on the results aggregated in the 2023 World Surf League rankings.

Athlete	Event	Round 1		Round 2	Round 3	Quarterfinal	Semifinal	Final / BM	
Athlete	Event	Score	Rank	Opposition Result	Opposition Result	Opposition Result	Opposition Result	Opposition Result	Rank
Ethan Ewing	Men's shortboard	9.90	1 R3	Bye	O'Leary (JPN); W 14.17–11.00	Robinson (AUS); L 13.00–15.33	Did not advance		
Jack Robinson	Men's shortboard	13.36	2 R2	Mesinas (PER); W 16.87–10.83	Florence (USA); W 13.94–9.07	Ewing (AUS); W 15.33–13.00	Medina (BRA); W 12.33–6.33	Vaast (FRA); L 7.83–17.67	2nd place, silver medalist(s)
Molly Picklum	Women's shortboard	8.44	3 R2	Defay (FRA); L 7.43–11.83	Did not advance				
Tyler Wright	Women's shortboard	7.67	1 R3	Bye	Lelior (ISR); W 11.10–7.74	Marks (USA); L 5.37–7.77	Did not advance		

Qualification legend: R3 – Qualifies to elimination rounds; R2 – Qualifies to repechage round

== Swimming ==
Australian swimmers achieved the entry standards in the following events for Paris 2024 (a maximum of two swimmers under the Olympic Qualifying Time (OST) and potentially at the Olympic Consideration Time (OCT)): To assure their nomination to the Olympic team, swimmers must finish in the top two of each individual pool event under both the benchmark standard and the World Aquatics A-cut at the 2024 Australian Championships and Olympic Trials.

Men

Athlete	Event	Heat		Semifinal		Final	
Athlete	Event	Time	Rank	Time	Rank	Time	Rank
Ben Armbruster	50 m freestyle	21.86	8 Q	21.94	14	Did not advance	
Cameron McEvoy	50 m freestyle	21.32	1 Q	21.38	=1 Q	21.25	1st place, gold medalist(s)
Kyle Chalmers	100 m freestyle	48.07	6 Q	47.58	2 Q	47.48	2nd place, silver medalist(s)
William Yang	100 m freestyle	48.46	17 q	48.42	15	Did not advance	
Maximillian Giuliani	200 m freestyle	1:46.15	5 Q	1:45.37	5 Q	1:45.57	7
Thomas Neill	200 m freestyle	1:46.27	9 Q	1:46.18	10	Did not advance	
Samuel Short	400 m freestyle	3:44.88	5 Q	—N/a		3:42.64	4
Elijah Winnington	400 m freestyle	3:44.87	4 Q	—N/a		3:42.21	2nd place, silver medalist(s)
Samuel Short	800 m freestyle	7:46.83	9	—N/a		Did not advance	
Elijah Winnington	800 m freestyle	7:42.86	4 Q	—N/a		7:48.36	8
Samuel Short	1500 m freestyle	14:58.15	13	—N/a		Did not advance	
Isaac Cooper	100 m backstroke	54.21	21	Did not advance			
Bradley Woodward	100 m backstroke	54.34	25	Did not advance			
Se-Bom Lee	200 m backstroke	1:58.30	18	Did not advance			
Bradley Woodward	200 m backstroke	2:00.50	25	Did not advance			
Samuel Williamson	100 m breaststroke	1:00.50	24	Did not advance			
Joshua Yong	100 m breaststroke	59.75	12 Q	59.64	12	Did not advance	
Zac Stubblety-Cook	200 m breaststroke	2:09.49	2 Q	2:08.57	2 Q	2:06.79	2nd place, silver medalist(s)
Joshua Yong	200 m breaststroke	2:10.68	14 Q	2:09.89	8 Q	2:11.44	8
Ben Armbruster	100 m butterfly	51.33	11 Q	51.17	9	Did not advance	
Matthew Temple	100 m butterfly	50.89	7 Q	50.95	7 Q	51.10	7
Matthew Temple	200 m butterfly	1:57.39	23	Did not advance			
William Petric	200 m individual medley	1:58.84	11 Q	1:58.13	10	Did not advance	
Thomas Neill	200 m individual medley	1:59.13	14 Q	1:58.77	11	Did not advance	
William Petric	400 m individual medley	4:13.58	12	—N/a		Did not advance	
Brendon Smith	400 m individual medley	4:14.36	13	—N/a		Did not advance	
Jack Cartwright; Kyle Chalmers; Flynn Southam; Kai Taylor; William Yang^{[b]}	4 × 100 m freestyle relay	3:12.25	2 Q	—N/a		3:10.35	2nd place, silver medalist(s)
Maximillian Giuliani; Zac Incerti^{[b]} Thomas Neill; Flynn Southam; Kai Taylor^{[b]} Elijah Winnington	4 × 200 m freestyle relay	7:05.63	4 Q	—N/a		7:01.98	3rd place, bronze medalist(s)
Ben Armbruster^{[b]} Kyle Chalmers; Isaac Cooper; Matthew Temple; Joshua Yong	4 × 100 m medley relay	3:32.24	6 Q	—N/a		3:31.86	6
Kyle Lee	10 km open water	—N/a				1:56:42.5	13
Nicholas Sloman	10 km open water	—N/a				1:56:24.4	11

Women

Athlete	Event	Heat		Semifinal		Final	
Athlete	Event	Time	Rank	Time	Rank	Time	Rank
Meg Harris	50 m freestyle	24.50	5 Q	24.33	6 Q	23.97	2nd place, silver medalist(s)
Shayna Jack	50 m freestyle	24.38	4 Q	24.29	5 Q	24.39	8
Shayna Jack	100 m freestyle	53.40	6 Q	52.72	2 Q	52.72	5
Mollie O'Callaghan	100 m freestyle	53.27	5 Q	52.75	3 Q	52.34	4
Mollie O'Callaghan	200 m freestyle	1:55.79	1 Q	1:54.70	2 Q	1:53.27 OR	1st place, gold medalist(s)
Ariarne Titmus	200 m freestyle	1:56.23	3 Q	1:54.64	1 Q	1:53.81	2nd place, silver medalist(s)
Jamie Perkins	400 m freestyle	4:03.30	5 Q	—N/a		4:04.96	8
Ariarne Titmus	400 m freestyle	4:02.46	2 Q	—N/a		3:57.49	1st place, gold medalist(s)
Lani Pallister	800 m freestyle	8:20.21	4 Q	—N/a		8:21.09	6
Ariarne Titmus	800 m freestyle	8:19.87	3 Q	—N/a		8:12.29 OC	2nd place, silver medalist(s)
Moesha Johnson	1500 m freestyle	16:04.02	5 Q	—N/a		16:02.70	6
Lani Pallister	1500 m freestyle	DNS		—N/a		Did not advance	
Kaylee McKeown	100 m backstroke	58.48	3 Q	57.99	2 Q	57.33 OR	1st place, gold medalist(s)
Iona Anderson	100 m backstroke	59.37	7 Q	58.63	4 Q	58.98	5
Jaclyn Barclay	200 m backstroke	2:10.53	17	Did not advance			
Kaylee McKeown	200 m backstroke	2:08.89	3 Q	2:07.57	2 Q	2:03.73 OR	1st place, gold medalist(s)
Jenna Strauch	100 m breaststroke	1:07.27	22	Did not advance			
Ella Ramsay	200 m breaststroke	2:25.61	14 Q	2:24.56	12	Did not advance	
Jenna Strauch	200 m breaststroke	2:24.38	8 Q	2:24.05	10	Did not advance	
Emma McKeon	100 m butterfly	56.79	5 Q	56.74	6 Q	56.93	6
Alexandria Perkins	100 m butterfly	57.46	8 Q	57.84	13	Did not advance	
Abbey Connor	200 m butterfly	2:07.13	3 Q	2:07.10	7 Q	2:08.15	7
Elizabeth Dekkers	200 m butterfly	2:08.97	8 Q	2:06.17	4 Q	2:07.11	=4
Kaylee McKeown	200 m individual medley	2:11.26	9 Q	2:09.97	7 Q	2:08.08	3rd place, bronze medalist(s)
Ella Ramsay	200 m individual medley	2:10.75	6 Q	2:10.16	8 Q	DNS	
Jenna Forrester	400 m individual medley	4:40.55	9	—N/a		Did not advance	
Ella Ramsay	400 m individual medley	4:39.04	6 Q	—N/a		4:38.01	5
Bronte Campbell^{[b]} Meg Harris; Shayna Jack; Emma McKeon; Mollie O'Callaghan; Olivia Wunsch^{[b]}	4 × 100 m freestyle relay	3:31.57	1 Q	—N/a		3:28.92 OR	1st place, gold medalist(s)
Shayna Jack^{[b]} Mollie O'Callaghan; Lani Pallister; Jamie Perkins^{[b]} Ariarne Titmus; Brianna Throssell	4 × 200 m freestyle relay	7:45.63	1 Q	—N/a		7:38.08 OR	1st place, gold medalist(s)
Iona Anderson^{[b]} Meg Harris^{[b]} Emma McKeon; Kaylee McKeown; Mollie O'Callaghan; Alexandria Perkins^{[b]} Jenna Strauch; Ella Ramsay^{[b]}	4 × 100 m medley relay	3:54.81	1 Q	—N/a		3:53.11	2nd place, silver medalist(s)
Chelsea Gubecka	10 km open water	—N/a				2:06:17.8	14
Moesha Johnson	10 km open water	—N/a				2:03:39.7	2nd place, silver medalist(s)

Mixed

Athlete	Event	Heat		Final	
Athlete	Event	Time	Rank	Time	Rank
Iona Anderson^{[b]} Kyle Chalmers^{[b]} Emma McKeon^{[b]} Kaylee McKeown; Mollie O'Callaghan; Zac Stubblety-Cook^{[b]} Matthew Temple; Joshua Yong	4 × 100 m medley relay	3:41.42	2 Q	3:38.76 OC	3rd place, bronze medalist(s)

^{b} Swimmers who participated in the heats only.

== Table tennis ==
Australia fielded a full squad of table tennis players into the Games, by virtue of their successful victory at the 2023 Oceania Championships in Townsville.

Men

Athlete	Event	Preliminary	Round 1	Round 2	Round of 16	Quarterfinals	Semifinals	Final / BM	
Athlete	Event	Opposition Result	Opposition Result	Opposition Result	Opposition Result	Opposition Result	Opposition Result	Opposition Result	Rank
Nicholas Lum	Singles	Bye	Ishiy (BRA); L 0–4	Did not advance					
Finn Luu	Singles	Bye	Miño (ECU); L 3–4	Did not advance					
Hwan Bae; Nicholas Lum; Finn Luu	Team	—N/a			Japan; L 0–3	Did not advance			

Women

Athlete	Event	Preliminary	Round of 64	Round of 32	Round of 16	Quarterfinals	Semifinals	Final / BM	
Athlete	Event	Opposition Result	Opposition Result	Opposition Result	Opposition Result	Opposition Result	Opposition Result	Opposition Result	Rank
Minhyung Jee	Singles	Bye	Mittelham (GER); L 0–4	Did not advance					
Melissa Tapper	Singles	Bye	Shin (KOR); L 0–4	Did not advance					
Michelle Bromley; Minhyung Jee; Melissa Tapper	Team	—N/a			Chinese Taipei; L 0–3	Did not advance			

Mixed

Athlete	Event	Round of 16	Quarterfinals	Semifinals	Final / BM	
Athlete	Event	Opposition Result	Opposition Result	Opposition Result	Opposition Result	Rank
Nicholas Lum; Minhyung Jee	Doubles	O Ionescu / Szőcs (ROU); L 1–4	Did not advance			

== Taekwondo ==
Australia qualified three athletes to compete at the games. Bailey Lewis, Leon Sejranovic, and Stacey Hymer qualified for Paris 2024 by winning the final match in their respective weight classes at the 2024 Oceania Qualification Tournament in Honiara, Solomon Islands. Originally, Australia were allocated 4 spots, but later, Oceania Taekwondo Union disabled one Olympic quota spot due to the event not having the minimum number of athletes participating in the weight class (Women −49 kg), that being a minimum of 4; therefore the quota places is re-allocated to the WT Olympic Rankings list.

Athlete	Event	Qualification	Round of 16	Quarterfinals	Semifinals	Repechage	Final / BM	
Athlete	Event	Opposition Result	Opposition Result	Opposition Result	Opposition Result	Opposition Result	Opposition Result	Rank
Bailey Lewis	Men's −58 kg	Bye	Issaka (NIG); W 2–0	Jendoubi (TUN); L 0–2	Did not advance			
Leon Sejranovic	Men's −80 kg	Bye	Katoussi (TUN); L 0–2	Did not advance		Hrnic (DEN); L 0–2	Did not advance	
Stacey Hymer	Women's −57 kg	—N/a	Pacheco (BRA); L 0–2	Did not advance				

== Tennis ==
The main qualifying criterion will be players' positions on the ATP and WTA ranking lists published on 10 June 2024 after the 2024 French Open. The players entering were formally submitted by the International Tennis Federation. The ATP and WTA rankings were based on performances from the previous 52 weeks, and there were several tournaments in the two-month period between the time of the rankings being frozen for entry and the beginning of the tennis events at the Olympics. Top ranked men's singles tennis player Alex de Minaur was originally planned to compete, but had to withdraw from the singles event due to a hip injury and this was the second consecutive Olympics that did not compete in singles.

Men

Athlete	Event	Round of 64	Round of 32	Round of 16	Quarterfinals	Semifinals	Final / BM	
Athlete	Event	Opposition Score	Opposition Score	Opposition Score	Opposition Score	Opposition Score	Opposition Score	Rank
Matthew Ebden	Singles	Djokovic (SRB); L 0–6, 1–6	Did not advance					
Alexei Popyrin	Singles	Jarry (CHI); W 6–3, 7–6^{(7–5)}	Wawrinka (SUI); W 6–4, 7–5	Zverev (GER); L 5–7, 3–6	Did not advance			
Rinky Hijikata	Singles	Medvedev (AIN); L 2–6, 1–6	Did not advance					
Matthew Ebden; John Peers	Doubles	—N/a	Habib / Hassan (LBN); W 7–6^{(7–5)}, 6–2	Carreño Busta / Granollers (ESP); W 6–2, 7–5	Koepfer / Struff (GER); W 7–6^{(7–2)}, 7–6^{(7–4)}	Fritz / Paul (USA); W 7–5, 6–2	Krajicek / Ram (USA); W 6–7^{(6–8)}, 7–6^{(7–1)}, [10–8]	1st place, gold medalist(s)
Alex de Minaur; Alexei Popyrin	Doubles	—N/a	Krajicek / Ram (USA); L 2–6, 3–6	Did not advance				

Women

Athlete	Event	Round of 64	Round of 32	Round of 16	Quarterfinals	Semifinals	Final / BM	
Athlete	Event	Opposition Score	Opposition Score	Opposition Score	Opposition Score	Opposition Score	Opposition Score	Rank
Ajla Tomljanović	Singles	Gauff (USA); L 3–6, 0–6	Did not advance					
Olivia Gadecki	Singles	Rus (NED); L 4–6, 1–6	Did not advance					
Olivia Gadecki; Ajla Tomljanović	Doubles	—N/a	Andreeva / Shnaider (AIN); L 3–6, 6–2, [6–10]	Did not advance				
Ellen Perez; Daria Saville	Doubles	—N/a	Gauff / Pegula (USA); L 3–6, 1–6	Did not advance				

Mixed

Athlete	Event	Round of 16	Quarterfinals	Semifinals	Final / BM	
Athlete	Event	Opposition Score	Opposition Score	Opposition Score	Opposition Score	Rank
Matthew Ebden; Ellen Perez	Doubles	Granollers / Sorribes Tormo (ESP); W 6–3, 6–4	Xin Wang / Zhang (CHN); L 7–6^{(10–8)}, 6–7^{(8–10)}, [5–10]	Did not advance		

== Triathlon ==
Australia confirmed four quota places (two per gender) in the triathlon events for Paris following the release of the final mixed relay Olympic qualification ranking.

Individual

Athlete	Event	Time						Rank
Athlete	Event	Swim (1.5 km)	Trans 1	Bike (40 km)	Trans 2	Run (10 km)	Total	Rank
Matthew Hauser	Men's	20:14	0:49	52:26	0:24	30:24	1:44:17	7
Luke Willian	Men's	22:09	0:54	53:40	0:25	34:05	1:51:13	46
Sophie Linn	Women's	23:56	0:54	57:59	0:28	35:35	1:58:52	21
Natalie Van Coevorden	Women's	24:18	0:56	1:00:26	0:29	36:52	2:03:01	42

Relay

Athlete	Event	Time						Rank
Athlete	Event	Swim (300 m)	Trans 1	Bike (7 km)	Trans 2	Run (2 km)	Total	Rank
Luke Willian	Mixed relay	4:14	1:02	9:36	0:25	4:58	20:15	—N/a
Natalie Van Coevorden	Mixed relay	5:21	1:10	11:36	0:27	6:05	24:39	—N/a
Matthew Hauser	Mixed relay	4:24	1:05	9:36	0:22	5:01	20:28	—N/a
Sophie Linn	Mixed relay	5:01	1:06	10:56	0:27	5:58	23:28	—N/a
Total	Mixed relay	—N/a					1:28:50	12

== Volleyball ==
=== Beach ===
Australian men's and women's pairs qualified for Paris based on the FIVB Beach Volleyball Olympic Ranking. Later on, another men's pair qualified for Paris after winning the 2024 AVC Continental Cup Final in Ningbo, China.

Athletes	Event	Preliminary round				LL	Round of 16	Quarterfinal	Semifinal	Final / BM	
Athletes	Event	Opposition Score	Opposition Score	Opposition Score	Rank	Opposition Score	Opposition Score	Opposition Score	Opposition Score	Opposition Score	Rank
Thomas Hodges; Zachery Schubert	Men's	Bryl / Łosiak (POL); L (16–21, 16–21)	Ehlers / Wickler (GER); L (21–16, 18–21, 17–19)	Bassereau / Lyneel (FRA); W (21–16, 22–20)	3 LL	Budinger / Evans (USA); L (19–21, 17–21)	Did not advance				=17
Izac Carracher; Mark Nicolaidis	Men's	Åhman / Hellvig (SWE); L (14–21, 19–21)	Cottafava / Nicolai (ITA); L (19–21, 18–21)	Cherif / Ahmed (QAT); L (14–21, 18–21)	4	Did not advance					=19
Taliqua Clancy; Mariafe Artacho del Solar	Women's	Xue / Xia (CHN); W (22–20, 14–21, 16–14)	Nuss / Kloth (USA); L (16–21, 16–21)	Bansley / Bukovec (CAN); W (21–10, 21–16)	2 Q	Bye	Seixas / Salgado (BRA); W (24–22, 21–14)	Böbner / Vergé-Dépré (SUI); W (21–19,16–21,15–12)	Ana Patricia / Duda (BRA); L (22–20,15–21,12–15)	Bronze Medal Match; Hüberli / Betschart (SUI); L (17–21,15–21)	4

== Water polo ==
Summary

Key:
- FT – After full time.
- P – Match decided by penalty-shootout.

Team	Event	Group stage						Quarterfinal	Semifinal	Final / BM	
Team	Event	Opposition Score	Opposition Score	Opposition Score	Opposition Score	Opposition Score	Rank	Opposition Score	Opposition Score	Opposition Score	Rank
Australia men's	Men's tournament	Spain; L 5–9	Serbia; W 8–3	France; W 9–8	Hungary; W 9–8	Japan; L 13–14	2 Q	United States; L 10–11 (P)	5th–8th Classification; Greece; L 9–15	7th–8th place match Italy; L 6–10	8
Australia women's	Women's tournament	China; W 7–5	Netherlands; W 15–14 (P)	Canada; W 10–7	Hungary; W 14–12 (P)	—N/a	1 Q	Greece; W 9–6	United States; W 14–13 (P)	Spain; L 9–11	2nd place, silver medalist(s)

=== Men's tournament ===
Australia men's national water polo team qualified for the Olympics by being the only Oceanian team at the 2024 World Aquatics Championships.

Team roster The roster was announced on 28 May 2024.

Head coach: Tim Hamill

- 1 Nic Porter GK
- 2 Angus Lambie CF
- 3 Milos Maksimovic D
- 4 Charlie Negus D
- 5 Nathan Power (c) CB
- 6 Lachlan Edwards CF
- 7 Luke Pavillard W
- 8 Jacob Mercep W
- 9 Matthew Byrnes D
- 10 Marcus Berehulak CB
- 11 Chaz Poot D
- 12 Blake Edwards D
- 13 John Hedges GK

Group play

Pos	Team	Pld	W	PSW	PSL	L	GF	GA	GD	Pts	Qualification
1	Spain	5	5	0	0	0	67	39	+28	15	Quarterfinals
2	Australia	5	3	0	0	2	44	42	+2	9 (Note: Australia 9–8 Hungary)	Quarterfinals
3	Hungary	5	3	0	0	2	62	54	+8	9	Quarterfinals
4	Serbia	5	2	0	0	3	58	63	−5	6	Quarterfinals
5	France (H)	5	1	0	0	4	50	60	−10	3 (Note: France 14–13 Japan)	
6	Japan	5	1	0	0	4	60	83	−23	3	

Source: Olympics
Rules for classification: 1) Points; 2) Head-to-head points; 3) Head-to-head goal difference; 4) Head-to-head goals scored; 5) Goal difference.
(H) Host
Notes:

28 July 2024; 10:30 v	Report	Australia	5–9	Spain	Paris Aquatic Centre, Paris; Referees: Georgios Stavridis (GRE), Darren Spiritosanto (USA)
28 July 2024; 10:30 v	Report	Score by quarters: 1–2, 2–3, 1–3, 1–1			Paris Aquatic Centre, Paris; Referees: Georgios Stavridis (GRE), Darren Spiritosanto (USA)
28 July 2024; 10:30 v	Report	Lambie, Maksimovic 2	Goals	Munárriz 3	Paris Aquatic Centre, Paris; Referees: Georgios Stavridis (GRE), Darren Spiritosanto (USA)

30 July 2024; 10:30 v	Report	Australia	8–3	Serbia	Paris Aquatic Centre, Paris; Referees: Andrej Franulović (CRO), Zhang Liang (CHN)
30 July 2024; 10:30 v	Report	Score by quarters: 1–0, 5–1, 1–0, 1–2			Paris Aquatic Centre, Paris; Referees: Andrej Franulović (CRO), Zhang Liang (CHN)
30 July 2024; 10:30 v	Report	Pavillard 4	Goals	Mandić 2	Paris Aquatic Centre, Paris; Referees: Andrej Franulović (CRO), Zhang Liang (CHN)

1 August 2024; 15:00 v	Report	France	8–9	Australia	Paris Aquatic Centre, Paris; Referees: Andrej Franulović (CRO), Veselin Mišković (MNE)
1 August 2024; 15:00 v	Report	Score by quarters: 0–1, 3–3, 2–3, 3–2			Paris Aquatic Centre, Paris; Referees: Andrej Franulović (CRO), Veselin Mišković (MNE)
1 August 2024; 15:00 v	Report	Crousillat, Bjoch 3	Goals	Maksimovic 3	Paris Aquatic Centre, Paris; Referees: Andrej Franulović (CRO), Veselin Mišković (MNE)

3 August 2024; 15:00 v	Report	Australia	9–8	Hungary	Paris Aquatic Centre, Paris; Referees: Georgios Stavridis (GRE), Veselin Mišković (MNE)
3 August 2024; 15:00 v	Report	Score by quarters: 2–2, 2–3, 2–2, 3–1			Paris Aquatic Centre, Paris; Referees: Georgios Stavridis (GRE), Veselin Mišković (MNE)
3 August 2024; 15:00 v	Report	Edwards, Maksimovic 2	Goals	Manhercz 4	Paris Aquatic Centre, Paris; Referees: Georgios Stavridis (GRE), Veselin Mišković (MNE)

5 August 2024; 13:35 v	Report	Australia	13–14	Japan	Paris La Défense Arena, Paris; Referees: Rafaele Colombo (ITA), Darren Spiritosanto (USA)
5 August 2024; 13:35 v	Report	Score by quarters: 5–2, 2–4, 2–4, 4–4			Paris La Défense Arena, Paris; Referees: Rafaele Colombo (ITA), Darren Spiritosanto (USA)
5 August 2024; 13:35 v	Report	Maksimovic 3	Goals	Inaba 6	Paris La Défense Arena, Paris; Referees: Rafaele Colombo (ITA), Darren Spiritosanto (USA)

Quarterfinal

7 August 2024; 19:00 v	Report	United States	11–10 (PSO)	Australia	Paris La Défense Arena, Paris; Referees: Rafaele Colombo (ITA), Sébastien Dervieux (FRA)
7 August 2024; 19:00 v	Report	Score by quarters: 1–3, 2–2, 2–0, 2–2 PSO: 4–3			Paris La Défense Arena, Paris; Referees: Rafaele Colombo (ITA), Sébastien Dervieux (FRA)
7 August 2024; 19:00 v	Report	Bowen, Daube 2	Goals	Pavillard 4	Paris La Défense Arena, Paris; Referees: Rafaele Colombo (ITA), Sébastien Dervieux (FRA)

5–8th place semifinal

9 August 2024; 18:00 v	Report	Greece	15–9	Australia	Paris La Défense Arena, Paris; Referees: Tamás Kovács (HUN), Andrej Franulović (CRO)
9 August 2024; 18:00 v	Report	Score by quarters: 3–1, 2–2, 5–3, 5–3			Paris La Défense Arena, Paris; Referees: Tamás Kovács (HUN), Andrej Franulović (CRO)
9 August 2024; 18:00 v	Report	Kakaris 4	Goals	three players 2	Paris La Défense Arena, Paris; Referees: Tamás Kovács (HUN), Andrej Franulović (CRO)

Seventh place game

10 August 2024; 19:35 v	Report	Australia	6–10	Italy	Paris La Défense Arena, Paris; Referees: David Gómez (ESP), Chisato Kurosaki (JPN)
10 August 2024; 19:35 v	Report	Score by quarters: 1–2, 1–3, 2–4, 2–1			Paris La Défense Arena, Paris; Referees: David Gómez (ESP), Chisato Kurosaki (JPN)
10 August 2024; 19:35 v	Report	Maksimovic 2	Goals	Iocchi Gratta 3	Paris La Défense Arena, Paris; Referees: David Gómez (ESP), Chisato Kurosaki (JPN)

=== Women's tournament ===
Australia women's national water polo team qualified for the Olympics following the triumph of the gold medal achievement through 2023 Oceania Qualifier Series in Auckland, New Zealand.

Team roster The roster was announced on 9 May 2024.

Head coach: Rebecca Rippon

- 1 Gabriella Palm GK
- 2 Keesja Gofers D
- 3 Elle Armit CB
- 4 Bronte Halligan D
- 5 Sienna Green CB
- 6 Abby Andrews W
- 7 Charlize Andrews D
- 8 Sienna Hearn D
- 9 Zoe Arancini (c) D
- 10 Alice Williams D
- 11 Matilda Kearns CF
- 12 Danijela Jackovich CF
- 13 Genevieve Longman GK

Group play

Pos	Team	Pld	W	PSW	PSL	L	GF	GA	GD	Pts	Qualification
1	Australia	4	2	2	0	0	33	28	+5	10 (Note: Netherlands 14–15 Australia)	Quarterfinals
2	Netherlands	4	3	0	1	0	52	37	+15	10	Quarterfinals
3	Hungary	4	2	0	1	1	46	37	+9	7	Quarterfinals
4	Canada	4	1	0	0	3	37	49	−12	3	Quarterfinals
5	China	4	0	0	0	4	34	51	−17	0	

Source: Olympics
Rules for classification: 1) Points; 2) Head-to-head points; 3) Head-to-head goal difference; 4) Head-to-head goals scored; 5) Goal difference.
Notes:

27 July 2024; 20:05 v	Report	Australia	7–5	China	Paris Aquatic Centre, Paris; Referees: Jennifer McCall (USA), Aurélie Blanchard (FRA)
27 July 2024; 20:05 v	Report	Score by quarters: 3–2, 2–1, 0–0, 2–2			Paris Aquatic Centre, Paris; Referees: Jennifer McCall (USA), Aurélie Blanchard (FRA)
27 July 2024; 20:05 v	Report	Andrews 3	Goals	Wang H. 2	Paris Aquatic Centre, Paris; Referees: Jennifer McCall (USA), Aurélie Blanchard (FRA)

31 July 2024; 14:00 v	Report	Netherlands	14–15 (PSO)	Australia	Paris Aquatic Centre, Paris; Referees: Jennifer McCall (USA), Natalia Markopoulou (GRE)
31 July 2024; 14:00 v	Report	Score by quarters: 3–1, 1–2, 1–3, 2–1 PSO: 7–8			Paris Aquatic Centre, Paris; Referees: Jennifer McCall (USA), Natalia Markopoulou (GRE)
31 July 2024; 14:00 v	Report	Van de Kraats, Van der Sloot 2	Goals	Green, Williams 2	Paris Aquatic Centre, Paris; Referees: Jennifer McCall (USA), Natalia Markopoulou (GRE)

2 August 2024; 14:00 v	Report	Australia	10–7	Canada	Paris Aquatic Centre, Paris; Referees: Alessia Ferrari (ITA), Georgios Stavridis (GRE)
2 August 2024; 14:00 v	Report	Score by quarters: 1–1, 3–1, 5–2, 1–3			Paris Aquatic Centre, Paris; Referees: Alessia Ferrari (ITA), Georgios Stavridis (GRE)
2 August 2024; 14:00 v	Report	Halligan, Williams 3	Goals	Wright 3	Paris Aquatic Centre, Paris; Referees: Alessia Ferrari (ITA), Georgios Stavridis (GRE)

4 August 2024; 14:00 v	Report	Hungary	12–14 (PSO)	Australia	Paris Aquatic Centre, Paris; Referees: Marta Cabañas (ESP), Adrian Alexandrescu (ROU)
4 August 2024; 14:00 v	Report	Score by quarters: 1–1, 2–2, 2–3, 4–3 PSO: 3–5			Paris Aquatic Centre, Paris; Referees: Marta Cabañas (ESP), Adrian Alexandrescu (ROU)
4 August 2024; 14:00 v	Report	Keszthelyi, Szilágyi 2	Goals	Williams 4	Paris Aquatic Centre, Paris; Referees: Marta Cabañas (ESP), Adrian Alexandrescu (ROU)

Quarterfinal

6 August 2024; 19:00 v	Report	Australia	9–6	Greece	Paris La Défense Arena, Paris; Referees: Alessia Ferrari (ITA), Sébastien Dervieux (FRA)
6 August 2024; 19:00 v	Report	Score by quarters: 1–0, 3–3, 2–1, 3–2			Paris La Défense Arena, Paris; Referees: Alessia Ferrari (ITA), Sébastien Dervieux (FRA)
6 August 2024; 19:00 v	Report	Williams 5	Goals	Xenaki 2	Paris La Défense Arena, Paris; Referees: Alessia Ferrari (ITA), Sébastien Dervieux (FRA)

Semifinals

8 August 2024; 19:35 v	Report	Australia	14–13 (PSO)	United States	Paris La Défense Arena, Paris; Referees: Georgios Stavridis (GRE), Tamás Kovács (HUN)
8 August 2024; 19:35 v	Report	Score by quarters: 1–2, 1–3, 4–2, 2–1 PSO: 6–5			Paris La Défense Arena, Paris; Referees: Georgios Stavridis (GRE), Tamás Kovács (HUN)
8 August 2024; 19:35 v	Report	Andrews 4	Goals	Flynn, Musselman 2	Paris La Défense Arena, Paris; Referees: Georgios Stavridis (GRE), Tamás Kovács (HUN)

Gold medal game

10 August 2024; 15:35 v	Report	Australia	9–11	Spain	Paris La Défense Arena, Paris; Referees: Nóra Debreceni (HUN), Andrej Franulović (CRO)
10 August 2024; 15:35 v	Report	Score by quarters: 2–2, 0–1, 3–4, 4–4			Paris La Défense Arena, Paris; Referees: Nóra Debreceni (HUN), Andrej Franulović (CRO)
10 August 2024; 15:35 v	Report	Williams 5	Goals	Ortiz 4	Paris La Défense Arena, Paris; Referees: Nóra Debreceni (HUN), Andrej Franulović (CRO)

== Weightlifting ==
Australia entered three weightlifters into the Olympic competition. Jacqueline Nichele (women's 71 kg), Eileen Cikamatana (women's 81 kg) and Kyle Bruce (Men's 89 kg) secured one of the top ten slots or the place of IWF Olympic Continental Qualification Ranking, each in their respective weight divisions based on the IWF Olympic Qualification Rankings.

Athlete	Event	Snatch		Clean & Jerk		Total	Rank
Athlete	Event	Result	Rank	Result	Rank	Total	Rank
Kyle Bruce	Men's −89 kg	148	12	182	10	330	10
Jacqueline Nichele	Women's −71 kg	94	11	115	10	209	10
Eileen Cikamatana	Women's −81 kg	117	4	145	4	262	4

== Wrestling ==
For the first time since 2016, Australia qualified two wrestlers for each of the following classes into the Olympic competition. Georgii Okorokov and Jayden Lawrence qualified for the games following the triumph of winning the semifinal round at the 2024 African & Oceania Olympic Qualification Tournament in Alexandria, Egypt.

Key:

- VT (ranking points: 5–0 or 0–5) – Victory by fall.
- VB (ranking points: 5–0 or 0–5) – Victory by injury (VF for forfeit, VA for withdrawal or disqualification)
- PP (ranking points: 3–1 or 1–3) – Decision by points – the loser with technical points.
- PO (ranking points: 3–0 or 0–3) – Decision by points – the loser without technical points.
- ST (ranking points: 4–0 or 0–4) – Great superiority – the loser without technical points and a margin of victory of at least 8 (Greco-Roman) or 10 (freestyle) points.
- SP (ranking points: 4–1 or 1–4) – Technical superiority – the loser with technical points and a margin of victory of at least 8 (Greco-Roman) or 10 (freestyle) points.

Athlete	Event	Round of 16	Quarterfinal	Semifinal	Repechage	Final / BM	
Athlete	Event	Opposition Result	Opposition Result	Opposition Result	Opposition Result	Opposition Result	Rank
Georgii Okorokov	Men's freestyle 65 kg	Rivera (PUR); L 2–12	Did not advance				10
Jayden Lawrence	Men's freestyle 86 kg	Yazdani (IRI); L 0–10	Did not advance		Kurugliev (GRE); L 0–10	Did not advance	16

== Controversy at the 2024 Olympics ==
Hockey player Tom Craig was arrested in France during the 2024 French Olympics.

B-girl Rachael "Raygun" Gunn experienced online backlash following her breakdancing round-robin battle, in which she did not score any points.

== See also ==
- Australia at the 2024 Summer Paralympics
