= Shenae Lowings =

Australian equestrian (born 1982)

Personal information
- Born: 29 August 1996 (age 29); Attadale, Australia

Sport
- Country: Australia
- Sport: Equestrian

Achievements and titles
- Olympic finals: Paris 2024

Shenae Lowings (born 29 August 1996 in Attadale, Australia) is an Australian eventing rider. She competed at the 2022 World Championships in Vivaro del Pratoni and won the CCI4*-L at the 2022 Melbourne International 3 Day Event.

Lowings represented the Australian eventing team at the 2024 Summer Olympics in Paris. She was initially reserve member, but stepped in for the show-jumping round after Kevin McNab pulled out.
