= Hilary Scott (equestrian) =

Australian equestrian

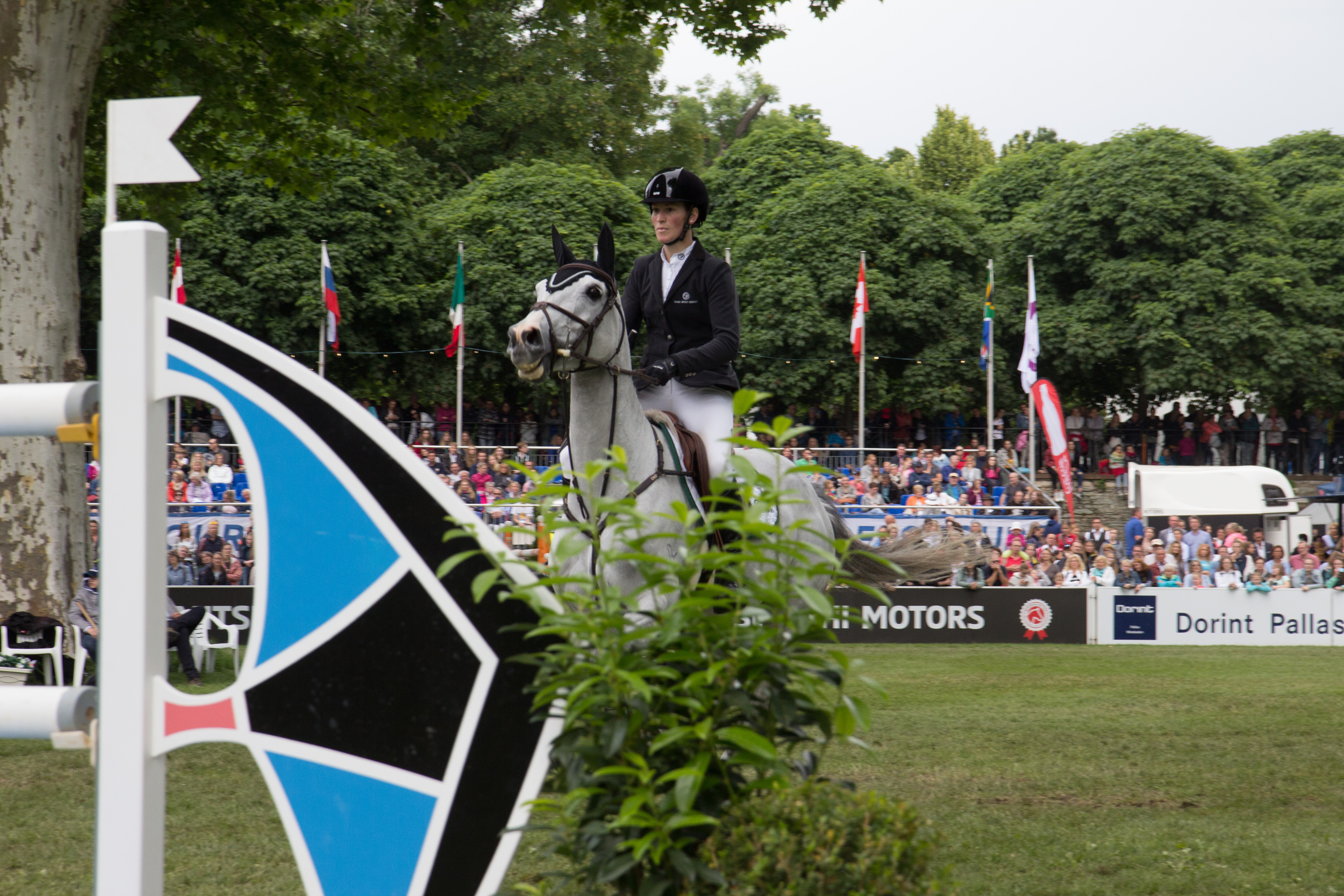
- Hilary Scott on Oaks Milky Way, 2018

Personal information
- Born: 9 April 1988 (age 38) Moree NSW, Australia

Sport
- Country: Australia
- Sport: Equestrian
- Coached by: Alois Pollmnan-Scheckhorst

Achievements and titles
- World finals: Herning 2022

Hilary Scott (born 9 April 1988 in Moree NSW, Australia) is an Australian equestrian athlete. She competed at the 2022 FEI World Championships in Herning, Denmark. In July 2024, Scott was selected by the Australian Equestrian Federation to represent the Australian team at the 2024 Summer Olympics in Paris, France.

== Personal life ==
Scott has an American mother and an Australian father. She resides in Valkenswaard, The Netherlands where she runs her equestrian business.
