= Thaisa Erwin =

Australian equestrian (born 1980)

Personal information
- Born: Thaisa Erwin; 22 August 1980 (age 45) Aberdeen, Scotland, United Kingdom

Sport
- Country: Australia
- Sport: Equestrian

Thaisa Erwin (born 22 August 1980 in Aberdeen, United Kingdom) is a British born Australian equestrian athlete. She competed at several international competitions in show-jumping. In July 2024, Erwin was selected by the Australian Equestrian Federation to represent the Australian team at the 2024 Summer Olympics in Paris, France.

== Personal life ==
Erwin was born in Aberdeen, but grew up in Russia and Australia. She attended the University of New England and the University of Newcastle, graduating with a double degree in environmental engineering.

She began riding horses as an eight-year-old and took up competitive riding as a teenager. By 2004, Erwin was in contention for a spot at the Athens Olympics. Riding her horse "The Countryman", Erwin qualified to go to Athens, however was not selected.

Erwin lives and works in Middleburg, Virginia, United States where she runs an equestrian business.
