= Field hockey at the 2023 Pacific Games – Men's tournament =

Men's Hockey5s at the 2023 Pacific games

2023 Pacific Games
Tournament details
- Host country: Solomon Islands
- City: Honiara
- Dates: 28 November – 1 December 2023
- Teams: 6 (from 1 confederation)
- Venue: 1

Final positions
- Champions: Fiji (3rd title)
- Runner-up: Papua New Guinea
- Third place: Vanuatu

Tournament statistics
- Matches played: 20
- Goals scored: 95 (4.75 per match)
- Top scorer: (Tonga) Aden Smith (10 goals)

The 2023 Pacific Games Hockey5s men's tournament was the third time the men's tournament was held whereby the Hockey5s format was used the second time instead of field hockey. It was held from 28 November to 1 December 2023, in Honiara, Solomon Islands. The tournament was held in a Round Robin format, with the first to fourth-placed teams competing in the semi-finals.

== Qualified teams ==
- Fiji
- Papua New Guinea
- Samoa
- Solomon Islands
- Tonga
- Vanuatu

== Preliminary round ==
All times are local (UTC+11:00).

=== Pool A ===
| Pos | Team | Pld | W | D | L | GF | GA | GD | Pts | Qualification |
|---|---|---|---|---|---|---|---|---|---|---|
| 1 | Fiji | 5 | 5 | 0 | 0 | 23 | 11 | +12 | 15 | Semi-finals |
| 2 | Papua New Guinea | 5 | 3 | 0 | 2 | 17 | 12 | +5 | 9 | Semi-finals |
| 3 | Solomon Islands | 5 | 2 | 1 | 2 | 13 | 8 | +5 | 7 | Semi-finals |
| 4 | Vanuatu | 5 | 2 | 1 | 2 | 12 | 13 | −1 | 7 | Semi-finals |
| 5 | Tonga | 5 | 2 | 0 | 3 | 13 | 20 | −7 | 6 | 5th place game |
| 6 | Samoa | 5 | 0 | 0 | 5 | 4 | 18 | −14 | 0 | 5th place game |

Source: FIH
Rules for classification: 1) points; 2) matches won; 3) goal difference; 4) goals for; 5) head-to-head result; 6) field goals for.

28 November 2023
08:30

| Fiji | 6–2 | Samoa |
|---|---|---|
| Ratubuli 2', 18', 13'; Underwood 12'; Mock 15'; Vatubua 18' | Report | Logopati 10'; Ioane 20' |

Umpires:
Brendan Bon (PNG)
Anton Paulin (NZL)

28 November 2023
09:20

| Solomon Islands | 7–2 | Tonga |
|---|---|---|
| Luiramo 1', 5', 12', 19'; Zuna 13'; Fairamoa 14', 18' | Report | Smith 1', 11' |

Umpires:
Epeli Tukuca (FIJ)
Frank Vira (VAN)

28 November 2023
10:10

| Vanuatu | 1–6 | Papua New Guinea |
|---|---|---|
| Maltungtung 10' | Report | Hebei 1', 13'; Kanamon 2', 17'; Pomoso 13'; Raoma 19' |

Umpires:
Aaron Wong (FIJ)
Benjamin Hocking (AUS)

28 November 2023
13:30

| Fiji | 7–5 | Tonga |
|---|---|---|
| Ratubuli 4'; Ah Yuk 5', 11', 14', 19'; Vatubua 15'; Underwood 16' | Report | Smith 1', 16'; Finau 3', 13'; Patolo 3' |

Umpires:
Benjamin Hocking (AUS)
Kelly-Anne Foskin (NZL)

28 November 2023
14:20

| Solomon Islands | 1–2 | Papua New Guinea |
|---|---|---|
| Luiramo 15' | Report | Kanamon 9'; Raoma 16' |

Umpires:
Anton Paulin (NZL)
Epeli Tukuca (FIJ)

28 November 2023
15:10

| Samoa | 0–4 | Vanuatu |
|---|---|---|
| | Report | Simeon 4'; Katmatem 8', 20'; Job 19' |

Umpires:
Aaron Wong (FIJ)
Brendan Bon (PNG)

29 November 2023
11:00

| Samoa | 0–3 | Solomon Islands |
|---|---|---|
| | Report | Temoa 4'; Luiramo 9'; Makana 13' |

Umpires:
Aaron Wong (FIJ)
Epeli Tukuca (FIJ)

29 November 2023
11:50

| Papua New Guinea | 2–3 | Tonga |
|---|---|---|
| Dusty 11'; Kanamon 17' | Report | Smith 6', 11', 15' |

Umpires:
Frank Vira (VAN)
Anton Paulin (NZL)

29 November 2023
12:40

| Vanuatu | 1–3 | Fiji |
|---|---|---|
| Maltungtung 3' | Report | Ah Yuk 5'; Smith 6'; Underwood 20' |

Umpires:
Brendan Bon (PNG)
Benjamin Hocking (AUS)

29 November 2023
16:00

| Papua New Guinea | 4–2 | Samoa |
|---|---|---|
| Dusty 3'; Kanamon 7'; Hebei 16'; Pomoso 17' | Report | Vaa 11'; Te'o 15' |

Umpires:
Aaron Wong (FIJ)
Epeli Tukuca (FIJ)

29 November 2023
16:50

| Solomon Islands | 0–2 | Fiji |
|---|---|---|
| | Report | Leger 20'; Ratubuli 20' |

Umpires:
Michelle Farnill (AUS)
Brendan Bon (PNG)

29 November 2023
17:40

| Tonga | 2–4 | Vanuatu |
|---|---|---|
| Finau 8', 12' | Report | Simeon 3'; Maltungtung 10', 20'; Johnson 18' |

Umpires:
Kelly-Anne Foskin (NZL)
Anton Paulin (NZL)

30 November 2023
08:30

| Fiji | 5–3 | Papua New Guinea |
|---|---|---|
| Ratubuli 5', 11'; Ah Yuk 9', 20+'; Underwood 18' | Report | Pomoso 7'; Pomaleu 8'; Pou 15' |

Umpires:
Anton Paulin (NZL)
Kelly-Anne Foskin (NZL)

30 November 2023
09:20

| Tonga | 1–0 | Samoa |
|---|---|---|
| Feiloaki 9' | Report |

Umpires:
Frank Vira (VAN)
Brendan Bon (PNG)

30 November 2023
10:10

| Vanuatu | 2–2 | Solomon Islands |
|---|---|---|
| Job 2'; Simeon 15' | Report | Luiramo 2'; Temoa 8' |

Umpires:
Benjamin Hocking (AUS)
Aaron Wong (FIJ)

== 5th place game ==
1 December 2023
09:50

| Tonga | 3–1 | Samoa |
|---|---|---|
| Smith 7', 14', 19' | Report | Te'o 18' |

Umpires:
Frank Vira (VAN)
Epeli Tukuca (FIJ)

== First to fourth place classification ==
=== Bracket ===
Semi-finals
30 November
Fiji (p.s.o.) | 1 (1)
Vanuatu | 1 (0)
30 November
Papua New Guinea (p.s.o.) | 2 (2)
Solomon Islands | 2 (0)

Final
1 December
Fiji (p.s.o.) | 0 (3)
Papua New Guinea | 0 (2)
Third place
1 December
Vanuatu | 2
Solomon Islands | 1

=== Semi-finals ===
30 November 2023
14:20

| Fiji | 1–1 | Vanuatu |
|---|---|---|
| Smith 8' | Report | Simeon 17' |
Penalties
| Ah Yuk (penalty shoot-out scored); Ratubuli (penalty shoot-out missed) | 1–0 | (penalty shoot-out missed) Maltungtung; (penalty shoot-out missed) Simeon |

Umpires:
Benjamin Hocking (AUS)
Anton Paulin (NZL)

30 November 2023
15:10

| Papua New Guinea | 2–2 | Solomon Islands |
|---|---|---|
| Hebei 6', 10' | Report | Temoa 11'; Satu 13' |
Penalties
| Kanamon (penalty shoot-out missed); Pou (penalty shoot-out scored); Hebei (penalty shoot-out scored) | 2–0 | (penalty shoot-out missed) Satu; (penalty shoot-out missed) Paekera |

=== Third place ===
1 December 2023
11:30

| Vanuatu | 2–1 | Solomon Islands |
|---|---|---|
| Nukur 7'; Johnson 16' | Report | Temoa 6' |

Umpires:
Epeli Tukuca (FIJ)
Anton Paulin (NZL)

=== Final ===
1 December 2023
13:10

| Fiji | 0–0 | Papua New Guinea |
|---|---|---|
| | Report |
Penalties
| Ah Yuk (penalty shoot-out scored); Mock (penalty shoot-out scored); Ratubuli (penalty shoot-out scored) | 3–2 | (penalty shoot-out scored) Kanamon; (penalty shoot-out missed) Dusty; (penalty shoot-out scored) Hebei |

Umpires:
Michelle Farnill (AUS)
Benjamin Hocking (AUS)

== Final standings ==
| Rank | Team |
|---|---|
| 1st place, gold medalist(s) | Fiji |
| 2nd place, silver medalist(s) | Papua New Guinea |
| 3rd place, bronze medalist(s) | Vanuatu |
| 4 | Solomon Islands |
| 5 | Tonga |
| 6 | Samoa |

== See also ==
- Field hockey at the 2023 Pacific Games – Women's tournament
