= Field hockey at the 2023 Pacific Games – Women's tournament =

Women's Hockey5s at the 2023 Pacific games

2023 Pacific Games
Tournament details
- Host country: Solomon Islands
- City: Honiara
- Dates: 28 November – 1 December 2023
- Teams: 6 (from 1 confederation)
- Venue: 1

Final positions
- Champions: Fiji (1st title)
- Runner-up: Solomon Islands
- Third place: Papua New Guinea

Tournament statistics
- Matches played: 20
- Goals scored: 61 (3.05 per match)
- Top scorer: (Fiji) Lala Ravatu (6 goals)

The 2023 Pacific Games Hockey5s Women's tournament was the first edition whereby the Hockey5s format is used instead of field hockey. It was held from 28 November to 1 December 2023, in Honiara, Solomon Islands. The tournament was held in a Round Robin format, with the first to fourth-placed teams competing in the semi-finals.

== Qualified teams ==
- Fiji
- Papua New Guinea
- Samoa
- Solomon Islands
- Tonga
- Vanuatu

== Preliminary round ==
All times are local (UTC+11:00).

=== Pool A ===
Pos	Team	Pld	W	D	L	GF	GA	GD	Pts	Qualification
1	Fiji	5	4	1	0	22	4	+18	13	Semi-finals
2	Solomon Islands	5	4	1	0	8	2	+6	13	Semi-finals
3	Tonga	5	2	0	3	7	13	−6	6	Semi-finals
4	Papua New Guinea	5	1	1	3	5	8	−3	4	Semi-finals
5	Samoa	5	1	1	3	4	10	−6	4	5th place game
6	Vanuatu	5	0	2	3	4	13	−9	2	5th place game

Source: FIH
Rules for classification: 1) points; 2) matches won; 3) goal difference; 4) goals for; 5) head-to-head result; 6) field goals for.

28 November 2023
11:00

Fiji	6–1	Samoa
Fabiano 3'; Bukalidi 5', 9'; Ravatu 6', 17'; Kumar 8'	Report	A. Ioane 4'

Umpires:
Lili Isiah (VAN)
Kelly-Anne Foskin (NZL)

28 November 2023
11:50

Papua New Guinea	2–2	Vanuatu
Kisapai 6'; Terence 15'	Report	Katawa 7', 11'

Umpires:
Michelle Farnill (AUS)
Anton Paulin (NZL)

28 November 2023
12:40

Tonga	0–1	Solomon Islands
	Report	Ghailobo 17'

Umpires:
Frank Vira (VAN)
Brendan Bon (PNG)

28 November 2023
16:00

Fiji	6–1	Vanuatu
Bukalidi 1', 2'; Burusova 6', 18'; Dansey 9'; Ravatu 11'	Report	Katawa 17'

Umpires:
Benjamin Hocking (AUS)
Michelle Farnill (AUS)

28 November 2023
16:50

Papua New Guinea	0–2	Solomon Islands
	Report	Hathera 7'; Ghailobo 16'

Umpires:
Kelly-Anne Foskin (NZL)
Aaron Wong (FIJ)

28 November 2023
17:40

Samoa	1–2	Tonga
Young 6'	Report	Tone 8'; Skinner 13'

Umpires:
Lili Isiah (VAN)
Michelle Farnill (AUS)

29 November 2023
08:30

Solomon Islands	3–1	Vanuatu
Ghailobo 13', 15'; Bobby 19'	Report	Kuai 2'

Umpires:
Kelly-Anne Foskin (NZL)
Epeli Tukuca (FIJ)

29 November 2023
09:20

Samoa	1–0	Papua New Guinea
Young 11'	Report

Umpires:
Michelle Farnill (AUS)
Frank Vira (VAN)

29 November 2023
10:10

Tonga	2–8	Fiji
Smith 8', 20'	Report	Dansey 4', 7'; Nautu 9', 12', 16'; Ravatu 15'; Kumar 17', 19'

Umpires:
Lili Isiah (VAN)
Benjamin Hocking (AUS)

29 November 2023
13:30

Solomon Islands	2–1	Samoa
Samo 4'; Roger 12'	Report	Muliaga 18'

Umpires:
Lili Isiah (VAN)
Aaron Wong (FIJ)

29 November 2023
14:20

Papua New Guinea	0–2	Fiji
	Report	Nautu 2'; Dansey 18'

Umpires:
Michelle Farnill (AUS)
Kelly-Anne Foskin (NZL)

29 November 2023
15:10

Vanuatu	0–2	Tonga
	Report	Skinner 2', 12'

Umpires:
Brendan Bon (PNG)
Benjamin Hocking (AUS)

30 November 2023
11:00

Fiji	0–0	Solomon Islands
	Report

Umpires:
Frank Vira (VAN)
Kelly-Anne Foskin (NZL)

30 November 2023
11:50

Vanuatu	0–0	Samoa
	Report

Umpires:
Anton Paulin (NZL)
Aaron Wong (FIJ)

30 November 2023
12:40

Tonga	1–3	Papua New Guinea
Tone 6'	Report	Perry 9', 12', 18'

Umpires:
Lili Isiah (VAN)
Epeli Tukuca (FIJ)

=== 5th place game ===
1 December 2023
09:00

Samoa	0–1	Vanuatu
	Report	Kalsav Aru 17'

Umpires:
Kelly-Anne Foskin (NZL)
Aaron Wong (FIJ)

== First to fourth place classification ==
Semi-final
30 November
Fiji	3
Papua New Guinea	0
30 November
Solomon Islands	3
Tonga	0

Final
1 December
Fiji	2
Solomon Islands	0
Third place
1 December
Papua New Guinea	2
Tonga	0

=== Semi-finals ===
30 November 2023
16:00

Fiji	3–0	Papua New Guinea
Ravatu 3'; Fabiano 18', 20'	Report

Umpires:
Kelly-Anne Foskin (NZL)
Benjamin Hocking (AUS)

30 November 2023
16:50

Solomon Islands	3–0	Tonga
Hathera 7'; Ghailobo 16'; Bobby 20'	Report

Umpires:
Michelle Farnill (AUS)
Brendan Bon (PNG)

=== Third place ===
1 December 2023
10:40

Papua New Guinea	2–0	Tonga
Kisapai 16', 17'	Report

Umpires:
Aaron Wong (FIJ)
Michelle Farnill (AUS)

=== Final ===
1 December 2023
12:20

Fiji	2–0	Solomon Islands
Ravatu 15'; Bukalidi 18'	Report

Umpires:
Brendan Bon (PNG)
Kelly-Anne Foskin (NZL)

== Final standings ==
Rank	Team
1st place, gold medalist(s)	Fiji
2nd place, silver medalist(s)	Solomon Islands
3rd place, bronze medalist(s)	Papua New Guinea
4	Tonga
5	Vanuatu
6	Samoa

== See also ==
- Field hockey at the 2023 Pacific Games – Men's tournament
