= Beach volleyball at the 2025 Junior Pan American Games =

Beach volleyball at the 2025 Junior American Games
- Venue: Los Pynandi World Cup Stadium
- Start date: August 18, 2025
- End date: August 22, 2025
- No. of events: 2 (1 men, 1 women)
- Competitors: 64

The beach volleyball tournaments at the 2025 Junior Pan American Games were held at the Los Pynandi World Cup Stadium, located in the Olympic Park in Luque, in the Greater Asuncion area.

The competition was an U-23 event and the top placed team from the NORCECA and CSV regions qualified to compete at the 2027 Pan American Games in Lima, Peru.

== Qualification ==
Qualification for the games was based on the NORCECA and CSV rankings as of January 1, 2025. NORCECA announced the teams after the last event of the 2024 season had concluded in October 2024.

=== Qualification Summary ===
Event/Criteria	Quotas	Men	Women
Host nation	1	Paraguay	Paraguay
NORCECA Rankings	8	Cuba; Costa Rica; Canada; El Salvador; United States; Dominican Republic; Nicaragua; Saint Kitts and Nevis	Dominican Republic; Canada; Costa Rica; United States; Cuba; El Salvador; Guatemala; Nicaragua
Torneo Sudamericano de Beach Volleyball U23 2025 (Cochabamba, Bolivia)	7	Ecuador; Brazil; Argentina; Uruguay; Bolivia; Chile; Peru	Brazil; Colombia; Bolivia; Argentina; Venezuela; Chile; Peru
Total	16	16	16

== Medal summary ==
=== Medal table ===
* Host nation (Paraguay)

Rank	Nation	Gold	Silver	Bronze	Total
1	United States	2	0	0	2
2	Venezuela	0	1	1	2
3	Brazil	0	1	0	1
4	Paraguay*	0	0	1	1
Totals (4 entries)		2	2	2	6

=== Medalists ===
Event	Gold	Silver	Bronze
Men's tournament	United States; Gage Basey; Thomas Hurst	Brazil; Isac de Farias; Jonathan Menezes	Venezuela; Juliangel Vargas; Esyenser Delgado
Women's tournament	United States; Portia Sherman; Emma Donley	Venezuela; Sara Sofia López; Darlin Rodríguez	Paraguay; Fiorella Núñez; Denisse Alvarez

== Men's tournament ==
=== Teams ===
Sixteen teams were drawn in four pools of four teams.

Team	NOC
Marcos González / Fausto Inostroza	Argentina
Julio Valverde / David Durán	Bolivia
Isac de Farias / Jonathan de Menezes	Brazil
David Chaput / Cameron McGregor	Canada
Martín Etcheberry / Fernando Quintero	Chile
Julián Araya / Jhostin Varela	Costa Rica
Damián Gómez / Eblis Verane	Cuba
Rolvin Maldonado / Ramón De Jesús	Dominican Republic
José Bowen / Isaac Jiménez	Ecuador
Christopher Guardado / Yoel Guardado	El Salvador
Deyner López / Jesy Umaña	Nicaragua
Juan Cañiza / Camilo Vargas	Paraguay
Clerique Ward / Julian Bristol	Saint Kitts and Nevis
Mikhail Cuadrado / Roberto Fernández	Uruguay
Gage Basey / Thomas Hurst	United States
Juliangel Vargas / Esyenser Delgado	Venezuela

=== Groups ===
==== Group A ====
Pos	Team	Pld	W	L	Pts	SW	SL	SR	SPW	SPL	SPR	Qualification
1	C. Guardado – Y. Guardado (ESA)	3	3	0	6	6	0	MAX	127	86	1.477	Quarterfinals
2	Etcheberry – Quintero (CHI)	3	2	1	5	4	2	2.000	119	97	1.227	Round of 16
3	Cañiza – Vargas (PAR)	3	1	2	4	2	5	0.400	119	136	0.875	Round of 16
4	Ward – Bristol (SKN)	3	0	3	3	1	6	0.167	99	145	0.683	13th–16th

Source: Beach Volleyball Men's Team Preliminary Phase Results

==== Group B ====
Pos	Team	Pld	W	L	Pts	SW	SL	SR	SPW	SPL	SPR	Qualification
1	Basey – Hurst (USA)	3	3	0	6	6	0	MAX	126	97	1.299	Quarterfinals
2	González – Inostroza (ARG)	3	2	1	5	4	2	2.000	111	96	1.156	Round of 16
3	Gómez – Verane (CUB)	3	1	2	4	2	4	0.500	109	106	1.028	Round of 16
4	Jiménez – Bowen (ECU)	3	0	3	3	0	6	0.000	79	126	0.627	13th–16th

Source: Beach Volleyball Men's Team Preliminary Phase Results

==== Group C ====
Pos	Team	Pld	W	L	Pts	SW	SL	SR	SPW	SPL	SPR	Qualification
1	Vargas – Delgado (VEN)	3	3	0	6	6	0	MAX	126	73	1.726	Quarterfinals
2	Chaput – McGregor (CAN)	3	2	1	5	4	2	2.000	109	102	1.069	Round of 16
3	Cuadrado – Fernández (URU)	3	1	2	4	3	4	0.750	104	115	0.904	Round of 16
4	López – Umaña (NCA)	3	0	3	3	0	6	0.000	77	126	0.611	13th–16th

Source: Beach Volleyball Men's Team Preliminary Phase Results

==== Group D ====
Pos	Team	Pld	W	L	Pts	SW	SL	SR	SPW	SPL	SPR	Qualification
1	Isac – Jonathan (BRA)	3	3	0	6	6	1	6.000	143	110	1.300	Quarterfinals
2	Araya – Varela (CRC)	3	2	1	5	5	2	2.500	141	115	1.226	Round of 16
3	Maldonado – De Jesús (DOM)	3	1	2	4	2	4	0.500	97	113	0.858	Round of 16
4	Valverde – Durán (BOL)	3	0	3	3	0	6	0.000	83	126	0.659	13th–16th

Source: Beach Volleyball Men's Team Preliminary Phase Results

=== Knockout stage ===
The winners of each group advanced directly to the quarterfinals. The teams placed second and third in each group advanced to the round of 16.

==== Bracket ====
Round of 16
20 August
Guardado – Guardado (ESA)
BYE
20 August
González – Inostroza (ARG)	2
Maldonado – De Jesús (DOM)	0
20 August
Isac – Jonathan (BRA)
BYE
20 August
Chaput – McGregor (CAN)	2
Cañiza – Vargas (PAR)	0
20 August
Vargas – Delgado (VEN)
BYE
20 August
Araya – Varela (CRC)	1
Gómez – Verane (CUB)	2
20 August
Basey – Hurst (USA)
BYE
20 August
Etcheberry – Quintero (CHI)	0
Cuadrado – Fernández (URU)	2

Quarter-finals
20 August
Guardado – Guardado (ESA)	1
González – Inostroza (ARG)	2
20 August
Isac – Jonathan (BRA)	2
Chaput – McGregor (CAN)	0
20 August
Vargas – Delgado (VEN)	2
Gómez – Verane (CUB)	1
20 August
Basey – Hurst (USA)	2
Cuadrado – Fernández (URU)	0

Semi-finals
21 August
González – Inostroza (ARG)	0
Isac - Jonathan (BRA)	2
21 August
Vargas – Delgado (VEN)	1
Basey – Hurst (USA)	2

Gold medal
22 August
Isac - Jonathan (BRA)	1
Basey – Hurst (USA)	2
Bronze medal
22 August
González – Inostroza (ARG)	1
Vargas – Delgado (VEN)	2

== Women's tournament ==
=== Teams ===
Sixteen teams were drawn in four pools of four teams.

Team	NOC
Maia Najul / Morena Abdala	Argentina
María Isabel Chacón / María José Galindo	Bolivia
Julia Lawrenz / Carolina Sallaberry	Brazil
Sophia Hladyniuk / Jaeya Brach	Canada
Viviana Urretaviscaya / Alejandra Dubost	Chile
Carolina Beleño / Mariana Gaviria	Colombia
Laura Molina / Sofía Vega	Costa Rica
Kailin Garrido / Maykelin Drik	Cuba
Yari Cleto / Crismil Paniagua	Dominican Republic
Karla Tovar / Daniela Vigil	El Salvador
Ana Sofía Arévalo / Danna Aguilar	Guatemala
Nahima Silva / Norma Brenes	Nicaragua
Fiorella Núñez / Denisse Alvarez	Paraguay
Stephannie Castillo / Yezet Romero	Peru
Portia Sherman / Emma Donley	United States
Sara López / Darlin Rodríguez	Venezuela

=== Groups ===
==== Group A ====
Pos	Team	Pld	W	L	Pts	SW	SL	SR	SPW	SPL	SPR	Qualification
1	Sherman – Donley (USA)	3	3	0	6	6	2	3.000	151	134	1.127	Quarterfinals
2	Núñez – Alvarez (PAR)	3	2	1	5	5	3	1.667	157	123	1.276	Round of 16
3	Najul – Abdala (ARG)	3	1	2	4	4	4	1.000	142	135	1.052	Round of 16
4	Silva – Brenes (NCA)	3	0	3	3	0	6	0.000	68	126	0.540	13th–16th

Source: Beach Volleyball Women's Team Preliminary Phase Results

==== Group B ====
Pos	Team	Pld	W	L	Pts	SW	SL	SR	SPW	SPL	SPR	Qualification
1	Chacón – Galindo (BOL)	3	3	0	6	6	1	6.000	135	92	1.467	Quarterfinals
2	Garrido – Drik (CUB)	3	2	1	5	5	3	1.667	139	133	1.045	Round of 16
3	Castillo – Romero (PER)	3	1	2	4	2	5	0.400	109	133	0.820	Round of 16
4	Cleto – Paniagua (DOM)	3	0	3	3	2	6	0.333	128	153	0.837	13th–16th

Source: Beach Volleyball Women's Team Preliminary Phase Results

==== Group C ====
Pos	Team	Pld	W	L	Pts	SW	SL	SR	SPW	SPL	SPR	Qualification
1	López – Rodríguez (VEN)	3	3	0	6	6	1	6.000	136	93	1.462	Quarterfinals
2	Lawrenz – Sallaberry (BRA)	3	2	1	5	5	2	2.500	137	105	1.305	Round of 16
3	Molina – Vega (CRC)	3	1	2	4	2	5	0.400	102	130	0.785	Round of 16
4	Arévalo – Aguilar (GUA)	3	0	3	3	1	6	0.167	90	137	0.657	13th–16th

Source: Beach Volleyball Women's Team Preliminary Phase Results

==== Group D ====
Pos	Team	Pld	W	L	Pts	SW	SL	SR	SPW	SPL	SPR	Qualification
1	Hladyniuk – Brach (CAN)	3	3	0	6	6	0	MAX	126	83	1.518	Quarterfinals
2	Urretaviscaya – Dubost (CHI)	3	2	1	5	4	3	1.333	130	120	1.083	Round of 16
3	Mercy – Gaviria (COL)	3	1	2	4	2	5	0.400	109	109	1.000	Round of 16
4	Tovar – Vigil (ESA)	3	0	3	3	2	6	0.333	113	113	1.000	13th–16th

Source: Beach Volleyball Women's Team Preliminary Phase Results

=== Knockout stage ===
The winners of each group advanced directly to the quarterfinals. The teams placed second and third in each group advanced to the round of 16.

==== Bracket ====
Round of 16
20 August
Sherman – Donley (USA)
BYE
20 August
Garrido – Drik (CUB)	2
Mercy – Gaviria (COL)	0
20 August
Hladyniuk – Brach (CAN)
BYE
20 August
Lawrenz – Sallaberry (BRA)	2
Najul – Abdala (ARG)	1
20 August
López – Rodríguez (VEN)
BYE
20 August
Urretaviscaya – Dubost (CHI)	0
Castillo – Romero (PER)	2
20 August
Chacón – Galindo (BOL)
BYE
20 August
Núñez – Alvarez (PAR)	2
Molina – Vega (CRC)	0

Quarter-finals
20 August
Sherman – Donley (USA)	2
Garrido – Drik (CUB)	0
20 August
Hladyniuk – Brach (CAN)	2
Lawrenz – Sallaberry (BRA)	1
20 August
López – Rodríguez (VEN)	2
Castillo – Romero (PER)	0
20 August
Chacón – Galindo (BOL)	1
Núñez – Alvarez (PAR)	2

Semi-finals
21 August
Sherman - Donley (USA)	2
Hladyniuk – Brach (CAN)	0
21 August
López - Rodríguez (VEN)	2
Núñez – Alvarez (PAR)	0

Gold medal
22 August
Sherman - Donley (USA)
López - Rodríguez (VEN)
Bronze medal
22 August
Hladyniuk – Brach (CAN)	1
Núñez – Alvarez (PAR)	2

== See also ==
- (Indoor) volleyball at the 2025 Junior Pan American Games
