= Shooting at the 2025 Junior Pan American Games =

Shooting at the 2025 Junior American Games
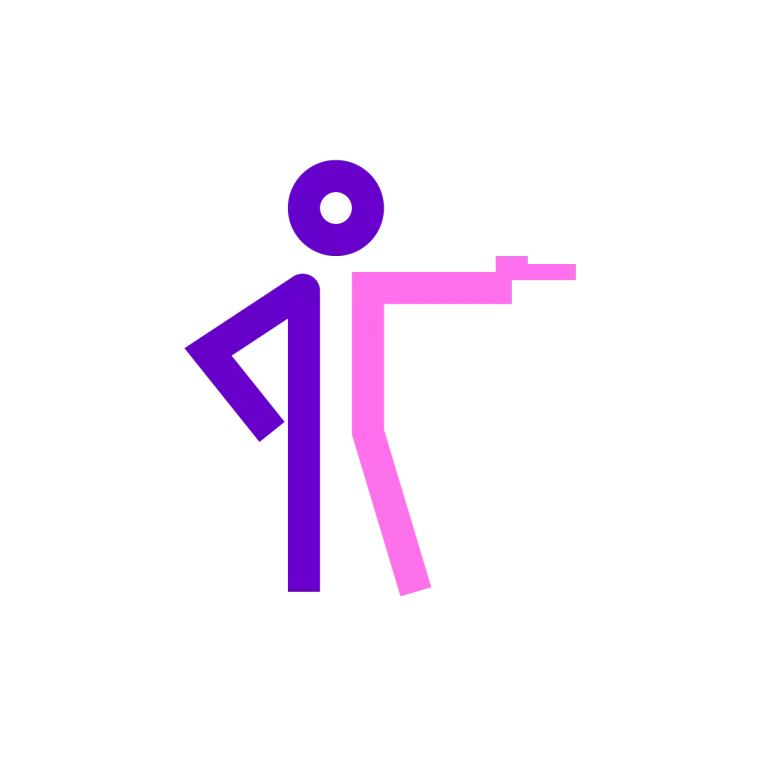
- Venue: Shooting Range
- Start date: August 9, 2025
- End date: August 12, 2025
- No. of events: 11 (4 men, 4 women, 3 mixed)
- Competitors: 104

The shooting events at the 2025 Junior Pan American Games were held at the Shooting Range, located in the Olympic Park in Luque, in the Greater Asuncion area. The events were contested between August 9 and 12, 2025.

Eleven events were contested, four for men, four for women, and three mixed. The winner of each event qualified for the 2027 Pan American Games in Lima, Peru.

== Qualification ==
A total of 104 athletes qualified for the events. Qualification was based on the results from a Rifle and Pistol Qualification Event, held in Asunción, Paraguay, and a Shotgun Qualification Event, held in Bridgetown, Barbados.

== Medal summary ==
=== Medal table ===
* Host nation (Paraguay)

| Rank | Nation | Gold | Silver | Bronze | Total |
|---|---|---|---|---|---|
| 1 | United States | 7 | 5 | 3 | 15 |
| 2 | Chile | 2 | 0 | 2 | 4 |
| 3 | Brazil | 1 | 1 | 3 | 5 |
| 4 | Guatemala | 1 | 0 | 0 | 1 |
| 5 | Mexico | 0 | 3 | 0 | 3 |
| 6 | Argentina | 0 | 1 | 2 | 3 |
| 7 | Peru | 0 | 1 | 0 | 1 |
| 8 | El Salvador | 0 | 0 | 1 | 1 |
| Totals (8 entries) | | 11 | 11 | 11 | 33 |

=== Medalists ===
==== Men ====
| Event | Gold | Silver | Bronze |
|---|---|---|---|
| 10 metre air rifle | Braden Peiser; United States | Griffin Lake; United States | Diego Santamaria; El Salvador |
| 10 metre air pistol | Diego Parra; Chile | Caio Almeida; Brazil | José Aguilera; Chile |
| Skeet | Raimundo Roche; Chile | Aidin Burns; United States | Rodrigo Moyano; Chile |
| Trap | Hussein Daruich; Brazil | Joaquín Cisneros; Argentina | Kaleb Horinek; United States |

==== Women ====
| Event | Gold | Silver | Bronze |
|---|---|---|---|
| 10 metre air rifle | Isabella Baldwin; United States | Elijah Spencer; United States | María Oblan; Argentina |
| 10 metre air pistol | Suman Sanghera; United States | Sofía Ibarra; Mexico | Josefina Mella; Argentina |
| Skeet | Emily Padilla; Guatemala | Gracelynn Hensley; United States | Alishia Layne; United States |
| Trap | Ava Downs; United States | Valentina Porcella; Peru | Ellen Mendes; Brazil |

==== Mixed ====
| Event | Gold | Silver | Bronze |
|---|---|---|---|
| 10 m air rifle | United States; Isabella Baldwin; Braden Peiser | Mexico; Hanna Cisneros; Josué Rodríguez | United States; Elijah Spencer; Griffin Lake |
| 10 m air pistol | United States; Suman Sanghera; Marcus Klemp | Mexico; Sofía Ibarra; Erick Ruiz | Brazil; Ana Beatriz Mariano; Caio Almeida |
| Trap | United States; Tony Meola; Carey Garrison | United States; Kaleb Horinek; Ava Downs | Brazil; Hussein Daruich; Ellen Mendes |

== Results ==
=== Men's 10 metre air rifle ===
Qualification round – August 11

| Rank | Athlete | Country | 1 | 2 | 3 | 4 | 5 | 6 | Total | Notes |
|---|---|---|---|---|---|---|---|---|---|---|
| 1 | Braden Peiser | United States | 104.2 | 103.5 | 105.4 | 104.5 | 103.2 | 105.5 | 626.3 | Q, JGR |
| 2 | Griffin Lake | United States | 105.1 | 103.2 | 103.8 | 103.6 | 103.7 | 104.3 | 623.7 | Q |
| 3 | Diego Santamaria | El Salvador | 104.1 | 103.3 | 104.2 | 102.3 | 102.3 | 104.1 | 620.3 | Q |
| 4 | José Pablo Piedrasanta | Guatemala | 102.6 | 104.8 | 102.1 | 102.3 | 103.3 | 101.3 | 616.4 | Q |
| 5 | Rex Liu | Canada | 103.6 | 100.7 | 103.3 | 102.9 | 103.8 | 101.8 | 616.1 | Q |
| 6 | Josue Rodríguez | Mexico | 101.9 | 101.5 | 103.3 | 104.2 | 102.0 | 101.9 | 614.8 | Q |
| 7 | Favio Salas | Peru | 102.9 | 102.3 | 102.2 | 101.8 | 102.7 | 102.4 | 614.3 | Q |
| 8 | Bruno Álvarez | Argentina | 103.2 | 99.6 | 103.9 | 102.3 | 103.5 | 101.2 | 613.7 | Q |
| 9 | José Manuel Alvarado | Mexico | 102.4 | 99.8 | 102.2 | 103.4 | 103.5 | 101.3 | 612.6 | |
| 10 | Santiago Serra | Argentina | 100.3 | 103.7 | 101.6 | 99.3 | 102.3 | 103.6 | 610.8 | |
| 11 | Juan Pablo Pineda | El Salvador | 102.0 | 102.2 | 101.1 | 102.2 | 102.7 | 100.2 | 610.4 | |
| 12 | Emanuel Lacerda | Brazil | 103.6 | 101.5 | 101.5 | 102.0 | 100.2 | 100.3 | 609.1 | |
| 13 | Jonathan González | Cuba | 101.1 | 101.7 | 102.1 | 101.9 | 100.6 | 101.4 | 608.8 | |
| 14 | Luis Cerda | Chile | 101.4 | 100.0 | 97.5 | 101.9 | 102.7 | 100.6 | 604.1 | |
| 15 | Pablo Álvarez | Chile | 99.4 | 102.4 | 99.0 | 102.5 | 102.1 | 94.7 | 600.1 | |
| 16 | Santiago Alfaro | Peru | 99.5 | 95.7 | 102.8 | 98.9 | 103.7 | 99.5 | 600.1 | |
| 17 | Jean Pedro Hodelin | Cuba | 99.3 | 100.6 | 98.9 | 98.8 | 99.4 | 99.7 | 596.7 | |
| 18 | Lucio Giménez | Paraguay | 95.9 | 91.7 | 96.7 | 90.2 | 95.1 | 96.4 | 566.0 | |

Final – August 11

| Rank | Athlete | Country | 1st Stage | | 2nd Stage | | | | | | | Total | Notes |
|---|---|---|---|---|---|---|---|---|---|---|---|---|---|
| 1st place, gold medalist(s) | Braden Peiser | United States | 52.8; 10.5; 10.1; 10.7; 10.8; 10.7 | 105.1; 10.5; 10.5; 10.6; 10.5; 10.2 | 126.0; 10.4; 10.5 | 146.9; 10.6; 10.3 | 168.3; 10.7; 10.7 | 188.8; 10.4; 10.1 | 209.1; 10.0; 10.3 | 230.0; 10.3; 10.6 | 10.8; 10.5 | 251.3 | |
| 2nd place, silver medalist(s) | Griffin Lake | United States | 51.3; 10.1; 10.5; 9.2; 10.7; 10.8 | 102.9; 10.6; 9.9; 10.0; 10.4; 10.7 | 123.6; 10.3; 10.4 | 144.6; 10.6; 10.4 | 165.7; 10.5; 10.6 | 186.4; 10.2; 10.5 | 206.8; 10.1; 10.3 | 227.0; 10.3; 9.9 | 10.7; 10.7 | 248.4 | |
| 3rd place, bronze medalist(s) | Diego Santamaria | El Salvador | 49.9; 10.2; 9.6; 9.9; 9.4; 10.8 | 100.5; 10.3; 9.8; 10.2; 10.5; 9.8 | 121.0; 10.2; 10.3 | 141.8; 10.5; 10.3 | 161.9; 10.1; 10.0 | 182.9; 10.6; 10.4 | 203.9; 10.6; 10.4 | 10.1; 10.9 | | 224.9 | |
| 4 | Bruno Álvarez | Argentina | 50.1; 10.1; 10.4; 9.3; 9.9; 10.4 | 101.5; 10.0; 10.7; 10.8; 9.8; 10.1 | 122.2; 10.4; 10.3 | 142.7; 10.1; 10.4 | 162.8; 9.7; 10.4 | 183.2; 9.8; 10.6 | 10.4; 10.2 | | | 203.8 | |
| 5 | Rex Liu | Canada | 49.8; 10.2; 9.5; 10.7; 9.4; 10.0 | 101.5; 9.6; 10.5; 10.8; 10.1; 10.7 | 121.0; 9.7; 9.8 | 141.3; 10.0; 10.3 | 161.2; 9.6; 10.3 | 10.1; 10.9 | | | | 182.2 | |
| 6 | José Pablo Piedrasanta | Guatemala | 49.0; 9.8; 9.4; 9.1; 10.2; 10.5 | 99.1; 9.2; 10.6; 9.9; 9.9; 10.5 | 119.5; 10.3; 10.1 | 139.6; 9.8; 10.3 | 10.6; 10.0 | | | | | 160.2 | |
| 7 | Josue Rodríguez | Mexico | 50.2; 9.9; 10.0; 10.3; 10.3 | 100.3; 10.6; 10.2; 9.2; 10.1 | 120.6; 10.1; 10.2 | 8.7; 9.9 | | | | | | 139.2 | |
| 8 | Favio Salas | Peru | 49.5; 9.4; 9.4; 10.2; 10.2; 10.3 | 99.6; 9.4; 10.2; 10.8; 9.1; 10.6 | 9.5; 10.3 | | | | | | | 119.4 | |

=== Men's 10 metre air pistol ===
Qualification round – August 10

| Rank | Athlete | Country | 1 | 2 | 3 | 4 | 5 | 6 | Total | Notes |
|---|---|---|---|---|---|---|---|---|---|---|
| 1 | Marcus Klemp | United States | 93 | 191 | 288 | 385 | 481 | 574 | 574 | QF, QJGR |
| 2 | Caio de Almeida | Brazil | 96 | 193 | 288 | 385 | 479 | 574 | 574 | QF, QJGR |
| 3 | Diego Parra | Chile | 95 | 189 | 283 | 379 | 475 | 571 | 571 | QF |
| 4 | José Aguilera | Chile | 95 | 190 | 283 | 380 | 475 | 571 | 571 | QF |
| 5 | Douglas Gómez | Venezuela | 90 | 185 | 278 | 369 | 466 | 560 | 560 | QF |
| 6 | Nicolás Paolino | Uruguay | 94 | 187 | 280 | 372 | 466 | 557 | 557 | QF |
| 7 | Erick Ruiz | Mexico | 95 | 187 | 278 | 370 | 463 | 555 | 555 | QF |
| 8 | Pedro Quintero | Mexico | 91 | 181 | 273 | 366 | 457 | 553 | 553 | QF |
| 9 | Nathan Lim | United States | 90 | 184 | 277 | 370 | 462 | 553 | 553 | |
| 10 | José Luis Gutiérrez | El Salvador | 90 | 183 | 277 | 368 | 461 | 552 | 552 | |
| 11 | Luis Delgado | Peru | 95 | 187 | 276 | 364 | 456 | 552 | 552 | |
| 12 | Ángel Ávila | Colombia | 94 | 182 | 274 | 365 | 458 | 551 | 551 | |
| 13 | Nicolás Colussi | Argentina | 87 | 177 | 268 | 365 | 457 | 550 | 550 | |
| 14 | Ricardo Cardona | Guatemala | 91 | 181 | 269 | 359 | 454 | 549 | 549 | |
| 15 | Carlos Herrera | Cuba | 91 | 181 | 271 | 365 | 457 | 545 | 545 | |
| 16 | Jonathan Caal | Guatemala | 88 | 178 | 268 | 360 | 441 | 536 | 536 | |
| 17 | Thor Barcelos | Brazil | 75 | 164 | 250 | 339 | 428 | 512 | 512 | |
| 18 | Waldir Zaracho | Paraguay | 88 | 171 | 256 | 335 | 421 | 511 | 511 | |

Final – August 10

| Rank | Athlete | Country | 1st Stage | | 2nd Stage | | | | | | | Total | Notes |
|---|---|---|---|---|---|---|---|---|---|---|---|---|---|
| 1st place, gold medalist(s) | Diego Parra | Chile | 49.2; 9.8; 10.4; 9.3; 9.3 | 98.3; 10.0; 9.0; 9.5; 10.4; 10.2 | 118.5; 9.7; 10.5 | 138.4; 9.8; 10.4 | 158.6; 9.8; 10.4 | 177.1; 9.5; 9.0 | 185.7; 9.3; 9.3 | 215.5; 9.7; 10.1 | 9.3; 10.2 | 235.0 | |
| 2nd place, silver medalist(s) | Caio de Almeida | Brazil | 50.3; 9.9; 10.8; 10.2; 10.0; 9.4 | 98.5; 9.6; 10.1; 9.4; 9.6; 9.5 | 116.7; 8.9; 9.3 | 136.6; 9.9; 10.0 | 157.5; 10.6; 10.3 | 117.4; 10.6; 10.4 | 195.6; 9.4; 8.8 | 214.6; 10.3; 8.7 | 8.6; 9.5 | 232.7 | |
| 3rd place, bronze medalist(s) | José Aguilera | Chile | 47.8; 9.8; 9.3; 8.7; 9.9; 10.1 | 99.2; 10.7; 9.6; 10.4; 10.8; 9.9 | 119.7; 10.4; 10.1 | 138.6; 9.3; 9.6 | 156.7; 8.6; 9.5 | 175.6; 9.2; 9.7 | 194.2; 9.2; 9.4 | 10.0; 8.8 | | 213.0 | |
| 4 | Nicolás Paolino | Uruguay | 49.6; 9.8; 10.1; 10.4; 9.3; 10.0 | 98.7; 9.2; 9.6; 10.5; 10.0; 9.8 | 117.7; 9.4; 9.6 | 136.1; 10.0; 8.4 | 155.3; 9.3; 9.9 | 174.5; 10.1; 9.1 | 9.3; 8.6 | | | 192.4 | |
| 5 | Marcus Klemp | United States | 49.5; 10.8; 10.1; 10.0; 8.3; 10.3 | 97.6; 10.5; 8.6; 10.1; 9.4; 9.5 | 117.7; 10.5; 9.6 | 136.6; 10.3; 8.6 | 155.3; 8.6; 10.1 | 9.2; 9.9 | | | | 174.4 | |
| 6 | Erick Ruiz | Mexico | 45.5; 8.2; 10.0; 8.2; 9.5; 9.6 | 94.3; 10.2; 9.9; 9.1; 10.1; 9.5 | 113.9; 9.5; 10.0 | 133.4; 9.7; 9.8 | 9.7; 10.2 | | | | | 153.3 | |
| 7 | Douglas Gómez | Venezuela | 48.9; 9.2; 10.5; 10.3; 8.9; 10.0 | 95.8; 9.7; 10.1; 9.3; 8.8; 9.0 | 113.8; 8.7; 9.3 | 9.2; 9.1 | | | | | | 132.1 | |
| 8 | Pedro Quintero | Mexico | 47.2; 7.8; 10.2; 9.4; 10.6; 9.2 | 95.0; 8.7; 10.5; 9.1; 9.3; 10.2 | 8.5; 8.7 | | | | | | | 112.2 | |

=== Men's skeet ===
Final – August 10

| Rank | Athlete | Country | Day 1 | Day 2 | Total | Final |
|---|---|---|---|---|---|---|
| 1st place, gold medalist(s) | Raimundo Roche | Chile | 72 | 50 | 122 | 55 |
| 2nd place, silver medalist(s) | Aidin Burns | United States | 68 | 45 | 113 | 51 |
| 3rd place, bronze medalist(s) | Rodrigo Moyano | Chile | 64 | 44 | 108 | 41 |
| 4 | Westley Kiter | United States | 60 | 42 | 102 | 33 |
| 5 | Miguel Hernández | Cuba | 52 | 41 | 93 | 22 |
| 6 | Patrick Taylor | Panama | 63 | 37 | 100 | 10 |
| 7 | Nicolás Vera | Guatemala | 54 | 37 | 91 | DNQ |
| 8 | Lucas Destarac | Guatemala | 51 | 37 | 88 | DNQ |

=== Men's trap ===
Qualification round – August 11

| Rank | Athlete | Country | 1 | 2 | 3 | 4 | 5 | Total | Notes |
|---|---|---|---|---|---|---|---|---|---|
| 1 | Joaquín Cisneros | Argentina | 20 | 24 | 19 | 22 | 23 | 108 | QF |
| 2 | Hussein Daruich | Brazil | 20 | 22 | 22 | 21 | 23 | 108 | QF |
| 3 | Tony Meola | United States | 20 | 22 | 17 | 20 | 21 | 100 | QF |
| 4 | Haddy Darwich | Brazil | 20 | 16 | 21 | 22 | 18 | 97 | QF |
| 5 | Jorge Clady | Argentina | 20 | 21 | 16 | 13 | 22 | 92 | QF |
| 6 | Kaleb Horinek | United States | 19 | 19 | 19 | 14 | 16 | 87 | QF |
| 7 | Gianmarco Brol | Guatemala | 18 | 12 | 14 | 13 | 13 | 70 | |
| 8 | Bruno Cárdenas | Paraguay | 14 | 8 | 11 | 13 | 9 | 55 | |
| 9 | Roberto Parr | Bolivia | 11 | 10 | 5 | 12 | 9 | 47 | |

Final – August 11

| Rank | Athlete | Country | Total | Notes |
|---|---|---|---|---|
| 1st place, gold medalist(s) | Hussein Daruich | Brazil | 41 | |
| 2nd place, silver medalist(s) | Joaquín Cisneros | Argentina | 39 | |
| 3rd place, bronze medalist(s) | Kaleb Horinek | United States | 30 | |
| 4 | Jorge Clady | Argentina | 24 | |
| 5 | Tony Meola | United States | 19 | |
| 6 | Haddy Darwich | Brazil | 16 | |

=== Women's 10 metre air rifle ===
Qualification round – August 11

| Rank | Athlete | Country | 1 | 2 | 3 | 4 | 5 | 6 | Total | Notes |
|---|---|---|---|---|---|---|---|---|---|---|
| 1 | Elijah Spencer | United States | 105.2 | 103.6 | 104.4 | 101.6 | 105.4 | 105.0 | 625.2 | Q |
| 2 | Isabella Baldwin | United States | 104.9 | 104.9 | 102.4 | 103.8 | 104.5 | 103.1 | 623.6 | Q |
| 3 | María Oblan | Argentina | 104.6 | 104.0 | 102.0 | 103.1 | 103.2 | 102.9 | 619.8 | Q |
| 4 | Hanna Cisneros | Mexico | 103.6 | 102.5 | 103.1 | 102.5 | 104.0 | 103.4 | 619.1 | Q |
| 5 | Emily Yang | Canada | 102.1 | 102.6 | 102.2 | 104.7 | 102.4 | 105.0 | 619.0 | Q |
| 6 | Micaela Arenas | Peru | 102.0 | 102.1 | 99.3 | 105.2 | 104.1 | 105.1 | 617.8 | Q |
| 7 | Aleandra Robinson | Puerto Rico | 103.2 | 102.3 | 101.7 | 104.0 | 103.4 | 102.6 | 617.2 | |
| 8 | Luisa Marquez | Mexico | 105.0 | 102.2 | 102.0 | 102.1 | 103.0 | 102.1 | 616.4 | Q |
| 9 | Aylén Miguel | Argentina | 102.2 | 103.4 | 103.2 | 103.4 | 101.9 | 101.9 | 616.0 | |
| 10 | Allison Aguilera | Chile | 103.0 | 100.9 | 103.3 | 102.6 | 100.5 | 102.3 | 612.6 | |
| 11 | Carmen Tiul de la Cruz | Guatemala | 102.0 | 103.4 | 100.6 | 100.7 | 102.6 | 102.5 | 611.8 | |
| 12 | Gracia Nuñez | Peru | 103.1 | 101.0 | 100.8 | 102.1 | 102.1 | 101.4 | 610.5 | |
| 13 | Sheileen Mauras | Puerto Rico | 99.6 | 101.8 | 100.4 | 102.5 | 101.5 | 102.3 | 608.1 | |
| 14 | Erisnelki Cruz | Cuba | 98.9 | 100.6 | 99.8 | 103.6 | 102.2 | 102.7 | 607.8 | |
| 15 | Diana López | Guatemala | 98.5 | 97.7 | 101.6 | 100.5 | 98.0 | 102.3 | 598.6 | |
| 16 | Diomaris Toro | Venezuela | 94.9 | 98.0 | 97.9 | 101.5 | 103.9 | 101.4 | 597.6 | |
| 17 | Lourdes Medero | Cuba | 96.0 | 97.0 | 97.9 | 100.3 | 100.3 | 99.0 | 590.5 | |
| 18 | Brodella Ramchere | Barbados | 95.8 | 100.7 | 99.1 | 99.3 | 97.4 | 96.5 | 588.8 | |
| 19 | Kathia Idoyaga | Paraguay | 88.8 | 98.3 | 93.7 | 97.3 | 97.2 | 101.7 | 577.0 | |
| | Luana Biazotto | Brazil | | | | | | | DSQ | |

Final – August 11

| Rank | Athlete | Country | 1st Stage | | 2nd Stage | | | | | | | Total | Notes |
|---|---|---|---|---|---|---|---|---|---|---|---|---|---|
| 1st place, gold medalist(s) | Isabella Baldwin | United States | 50.8; 10.3; 10.1; 10.1; 10.6; 9.7 | 102.7; 10.3; 10.4; 10.2; 10.3; 10.7 | 123.9; 10.5; 10.7 | 145.1; 10.7; 10.5 | 165.6; 10.2; 10.3 | 186.0; 10.5; 9.9 | 207.3; 10.6; 10.7 | 228.4; 10.5; 10.6 | 10.2; 10.4 | 249.0 | |
| 2nd place, silver medalist(s) | Elijah Spencer | United States | 50.8; 10.4; 9.7; 10.6; 10.1; 10.0 | 102.0; 10.1; 10.8; 10.5; 10.1; 9.7 | 122.8; 10.7; 10.1 | 143.6; 10.4; 10.4 | 164.2; 10.7; 9.9 | 185.3; 10.5; 10.6 | 206.1; 10.5; 10.3 | 227.2; 10.3; 10.8 | 10.1; 10.5 | 247.8 | |
| 3rd place, bronze medalist(s) | María Oblan | Argentina | 50.6; 10.1; 10.4; 10.2; 10.9; 9.0 | 102.6; 10.8; 10.3; 10.4; 9.9; 10.6 | 123.3; 10.3; 10.4 | 144.3; 10.6; 10.4 | 164.4; 9. 10.2 | 184.5; 10.2; 9.9 | 205.0; 10.1; 10.4 | 9.9; 10.5 | | 225.4 | |
| 4 | Emily Yang | Canada | 50.8; 9.7; 10.6; 9.8; 10.6; 10.1 | 102.1; 9.9; 10.5; 10.2; 10.1; 10.6 | 123.2; 10.4; 10.7 | 142.9; 9.9; 9.8 | 163.9; 10.1; 10.9 | 184.0; 10.1; 10.0 | 9.9; 9.8 | | | 203.7 | |
| 5 | Hanna Cisneros | Mexico | 50.8; 10.3; 9.7; 10.4; 10.1; 10.3 | 101.8; 10.6; 10.4; 9.7; 10.6; 9.7 | 122.7; 10.5; 10.5 | 143.3; 10.5; 10.1 | 163.6; 10.5; 9.8 | 10.5; 9.0 | | | | 183.1 | |
| 6 | Luisa Marquez | Mexico | 50.4; 9.9; 9.8; 10.2; 10.5; 10.0 | 102.6; 10.8; 10.3; 10.2; 10.4; 10.5 | 122.7; 10.0; 10.1 | 142.4; 9.5; 10.2 | 10.4; 10.4 | | | | | 163.2 | |
| 7 | Aleandra Robinson | Puerto Rico | 50.9; 9.9; 10.5; 10.8; 9.7; 10.0 | 101.1; 10.8; 9.9; 10.4; 9.1; 10.0 | 121.9; 10.5; 10.3 | 10.6; 9.8 | | | | | | 142.3 | |
| 8 | Micaela Arenas | Peru | 50.7; 10.5; 10.4; 10.5; 9.6; 9.7 | 100.4; 10.4; 9.0; 10.0; 10.2; 10.1 | 9.9; 10.1 | | | | | | | 120.4 | |

=== Women's 10 metre air pistol ===
Qualification round – August 10

| Rank | Athlete | Country | 1 | 2 | 3 | 4 | 5 | 6 | Total | Notes |
|---|---|---|---|---|---|---|---|---|---|---|
| 1 | Suman Sanghera | United States | 93 | 187 | 285 | 379 | 475 | 572 | 572 | Q, QJGR |
| 2 | Sofía Ibarra | Mexico | 97 | 190 | 282 | 376 | 568 | 561 | 561 | Q |
| 3 | Mia Rosales | Mexico | 91 | 184 | 275 | 369 | 465 | 561 | 561 | Q |
| 4 | Josefina Mella | Argentina | 95 | 189 | 286 | 378 | 467 | 558 | 558 | Q |
| 5 | Ana Mariano | Brazil | 94 | 185 | 277 | 369 | 459 | 552 | 552 | Q |
| 6 | Melany Abreus | Cuba | 94 | 183 | 271 | 362 | 456 | 551 | 551 | Q |
| 7 | Adrianet López | Cuba | 93 | 182 | 274 | 367 | 458 | 549 | 549 | Q |
| 8 | Ainoha Espinoza | Peru | 89 | 180 | 272 | 362 | 455 | 546 | 546 | Q |
| 9 | Danica Grbac | Chile | 86 | 177 | 271 | 362 | 458 | 544 | 544 | |
| 10 | Sneha Gupta | United States | 90 | 183 | 270 | 360 | 452 | 540 | 540 | |
| 11 | Maryorith Rivas | Guatemala | 87 | 178 | 262 | 353 | 446 | 533 | 533 | |
| 12 | Anasoli Rodríguez | Venezuela | 88 | 182 | 271 | 358 | 447 | 533 | 533 | |
| 13 | Mirela Herman | Venezuela | 88 | 175 | 265 | 352 | 440 | 531 | 531 | |
| 14 | Juana Munevar | Colombia | 86 | 172 | 260 | 350 | 441 | 529 | 529 | |
| 15 | Emily Herrera | Peru | 90 | 176 | 267 | 351 | 439 | 527 | 527 | |
| 16 | Frida Aguilar | El Salvador | 84 | 175 | 258 | 351 | 441 | 525 | 525 | |
| 17 | Camila Maalouf | Brazil | 92 | 182 | 268 | 356 | 445 | 523 | 523 | |
| 18 | María Rosa Cardozo | Paraguay | 83 | 173 | 255 | 343 | 431 | 516 | 516 | |
| 19 | Kelisa Clarke | Barbados | 86 | 170 | 257 | 341 | 428 | 511 | 511 | |
| 20 | María Alejandra Moreno | Panama | 76 | 163 | 248 | 332 | 417 | 501 | 501 | |

Final – August 10

| Rank | Athlete | Country | 1st Stage | | 2nd Stage | | | | | | | Total | Notes |
|---|---|---|---|---|---|---|---|---|---|---|---|---|---|
| 1st place, gold medalist(s) | Suman Sanghera | United States | 49.1; 9.7; 10.0; 9.0; 10.6; 9.8 | 99.7; 10.3; 10.4; 9.8; 9.9; 10.2 | 120.2; 10.7; 9.8 | 140.1; 10.2; 9.7 | 159.2; 8.8; 10.3 | 179.4; 9.7; 10.5 | 199.0; 9.3; 10.3 | 218.1; 9.7; 9.4 | 9.9; 9.2 | 237.2 | JGR |
| 2nd place, silver medalist(s) | Sofía Ibarra | Mexico | 48.1; 8.0; 9.9; 9.9; 10.0; 10.3 | 99.2; 10.4; 9.4; 10.2; 10.5; 10.6 | 117.8; 9.9; 8.7 | 136.6; 8.7; 10.1 | 156.8; 10.1; 10.1 | 178.0; 10.7; 10.5 | 197.6; 9.6; 10.0 | 217.8; 10.110.1 | 9.9; 9.3 | 237.0 | |
| 3rd place, bronze medalist(s) | Josefina Mella | Argentina | 41.7; 9.7; 10.1; 9.4; 10.0; 8.5 | 94.1; 8.8; 9.6; 10.5; 7.0; 10.5 | 114.8; 10.4; 10.3 | 133.5; 9.0; 9.7 | 152.9; 10.2; 9.2 | 172.8; 10.2; 9.7 | 192.7; 10.0; 9.9 | 9.1; 10.5 | | 212.3 | |
| 4 | Melany Abreus | Cuba | 48.8; 9.7; 9.5; 10.3; 9.6; 9.7 | 95.6; 9.4; 10.0; 7.9; 9.7; 9.8 | 115.6; 9.9; 10.1 | 134.2; 10.4; 8.2 | 153.2; 9.0; 10.0 | 174.1; 10.8; 10.1 | 9.1; 8.2 | | | 191.4 | |
| 5 | Ainoha Espinoza | Peru | 47.5; 9.3; 9.2; 8.2; 10.6; 10.2 | 93.2; 9.9; 9.0; 8.5; 9.5; 8.8 | 112.6; 8.9; 10.5 | 131.9; 10.1; 9.2 | 149.0; 8.4; 8.7 | 9.3; 7.7 | | | | 166.0 | |
| 6 | Adrianet López | Cuba | 48.3; 8.9; 10.5; 9.5; 9.5; 9.9 | 97.7; 9.8; 10.4; 9.9; 10.4; 8.9 | 115.9; 9.3; 8.9 | 134.8; 10.4; 8.5 | 7.1; 6.7 | | | | | 148.6 | |
| 7 | Mia Rosales | Mexico | 47.0; 7.9; 9.5; 9.7; 10.3; 9.6 | 95.4; 9.9; 9.7; 9.3; 9.5; 10.0 | 112.6; 9.2; 8.0 | 10.0; 9.0 | | | | | | 131.6 | |
| 8 | Ana Mariano | Brazil | 42.9; 8.6; 9.3; 7.9; 8.7; 8.4 | 93.1; 9.7; 10.7; 10.3; 9.8; 9.7 | 10.0; 9.2 | 10.0; 9.2 | | | | | | 112.3 | |

=== Women's skeet ===
Final – August 10

| Rank | Athlete | Country | Day 1 | Day 2 | Total | Final |
|---|---|---|---|---|---|---|
| 1st place, gold medalist(s) | Emily Padilla | Guatemala | 70 | 39 | 109 | 42 |
| 2nd place, silver medalist(s) | Gracelynn Hensley | United States | 62 | 37 | 99 | 41 |
| 3rd place, bronze medalist(s) | Alishia Layne | United States | 52 | 38 | 90 | 33 |
| 4 | Andrea Saavedra | Mexico | 38 | 35 | 93 | 19 |
| 5 | María Isabel Soto | Guatemala | 56 | 35 | 91 | 14 |
| 6 | Mara Kucharski | Argentina | 64 | 42 | 106 | 8 |
| 7 | Dayanis Montero | Cuba | 39 | 27 | 66 | DNQ |
| 8 | Daniela Nava | Mexico | 36 | 21 | 57 | DNQ |

=== Women's trap ===
Qualification round – August 11

| Rank | Athlete | Country | 1 | 2 | 3 | 4 | 5 | Total | Notes |
|---|---|---|---|---|---|---|---|---|---|
| 1 | Ava Downs | United States | 20 | 25 | 20 | 22 | 21 | 108 | QF |
| 2 | Carey Garrison | United States | 20 | 17 | 22 | 21 | 21 | 101 | QF |
| 3 | Valentina Porcella | Peru | 19 | 21 | 20 | 22 | 19 | 101 | QF |
| 4 | Josabet Hazoury | Dominican Republic | 21 | 18 | 17 | 15 | 16 | 87 | QF |
| 5 | Ellen Mendes | Brazil | 12 | 17 | 19 | 18 | 16 | 82 | QF |
| 6 | Sofía Poveda | Guatemala | 17 | 17 | 13 | 15 | 15 | 77 | QF |
| 7 | Andrea Saavedra | Mexico | 14 | 13 | 16 | 13 | 11 | 67 | |
| 8 | Giovanna Brol | Guatemala | 17 | 17 | 8 | 16 | 9 | 67 | |
| | Daniela Nava | Mexico | | | | | | DNS | |

Final – August 11

| Rank | Athlete | Country | Total | Notes |
|---|---|---|---|---|
| 1st place, gold medalist(s) | Ava Downs | United States | 45 | |
| 2nd place, silver medalist(s) | Valentina Porcella | Peru | 43 | |
| 3rd place, bronze medalist(s) | Ellen Mendes | Brazil | 29 | |
| 4 | Carey Garrison | United States | 20 | |
| 5 | Josabet Hazoury | Dominican Republic | 18 | |
| 6 | Sofía Poveda | Guatemala | 12 | |

=== Mixed team air rifle ===
Qualification round – August 12

| Rank | Athletes | Country | 1 | 2 | 3 | Total | Notes |
|---|---|---|---|---|---|---|---|
| 1 | Isabella Baldwin; Braden Peiser | United States | 207.8; 100.3; 104.8 | 205.6; 102.5; 103.1 | 209.1; 103.9; 105.2 | 622.5-44x | QG |
| 2 | Hannah Cosneros; Josue Rodríguez | Mexico | 208.8; 104.1; 104.7 | 205.4; 103.3; 102.1 | 207.8; 104.7; 103.1 | 622.0-46x | QG |
| 3 | Elijah Spencer; Griffin Lake | United States | 205.2; 102.1; 103.1 | 208.2; 104.3; 103.9 | 207.7; 103.0; 104.7 | 621.1-43x | QB |
| 4 | María Oblan; Bruno Álvarez | Argentina | 207.1; 103.0; 104.1 | 205.3; 103.0; 102.3 | 208.1; 102.9; 105.2 | 620.5-47x | QB |
| 5 | Allison Aguilera; Luis Cerda | Chile | 206.8; 104.2; 102.6 | 204.9; 101.9; 103.0 | 207.2; 104.5; 102.7 | 618.9-40x | |
| 6 | Carmen Tiul de la Cruz; José Pablo Piedrasanta | Guatemala | 204.9; 102.6; 102.3 | 208.4; 104.3; 104.1 | 204.4; 104.5; 99.9 | 617.7-41x | |
| 7 | Emily Yang; Rex Liu | Canada | 205.8; 101.1; 104.7 | 204.9; 102.2; 102.7 | 205.8; 102.6; 103.2 | 616.5-40x | |
| 8 | Aylén Miguel; Santiago Serra | Argentina | 208.0; 105.2; 102.8 | 201.6; 103.0; 98.6 | 204.7; 102.8; 101.9 | 614.3-39x | |
| 9 | Luisa Marquez; José Manuel Alvarado | Mexico | 203.3; 100.6; 102.7 | 203.0; 103.4; 99.6 | 203.1; 102.1; 101.0 | 609.4-37x | |
| 10 | Micaela Arenas; Favio Salas | Peru | 202.2; 102.7; 99.5 | 202.5; 100.9; 101.6 | 203.4; 102.3; 101.1 | 608.1-32x | |
| 11 | Erisnelki Cruz; Jonathan González | Cuba | 202.2; 102.6; 99.6 | 202.5; 101.9; 100.6 | 200.9; 99.2; 101.7 | 605.6-32x | |
| 12 | Luana Biazotto; Emanuel Lacerda | Brazil | 199.6; 101.0; 98.6 | 202.9; 101.5; 101.4 | 201.4; 102.2; 99.2 | 603.9-30x | |
| 13 | Gracia Nuñez; Santiago Alfaro | Peru | 200.4; 101.6; 98.8 | 200.1; 101.6; 98.5 | 202.8; 103.5; 99.3 | 603.3-28x | |
| 14 | Lourdes Medero; Jean Pedro Hodelin | Cuba | 198.2; 100.4; 97.8 | 199.4; 100.5; 98.9 | 199.4; 98.6; 100.8 | 597.0-22x | |
| | Kathia Idoyaga; Lucio Gimenez | Paraguay | | | | DNS | |

Final – August 12

| Rank | Athlete | Country | Total | Notes |
Gold Medal Match
| 1st place, gold medalist(s) | Isabella Baldwin; Braden Peiser | United States | 17 | |
| 2nd place, silver medalist(s) | Hannah Cosneros; Josue Rodríguez | Mexico | 7 | |
Bronze Medal Match
| 3rd place, bronze medalist(s) | Elijah Spencer; Griffin Lake | United States | 17 | |
| 4 | María Oblan; Bruno Álvarez | Argentina | 7 | |

=== Mixed team air pistol ===
Qualification round – August 12

| Rank | Athletes | Country | 1 | 2 | 3 | Total | Notes |
|---|---|---|---|---|---|---|---|
| 1 | Suman Sanghera; Marcus Klemp | United States | 185; 92; 93 | 195; 98; 97 | 193; 97; 96 | 573-19x | QG, JGR |
| 2 | Sofía Ibarra; Erick Ruiz | Mexico | 187; 93; 94 | 185; 91; 94 | 191; 93; 98 | 563-10x | QG |
| 3 | Mia Rosales; Pedro Quintero | Mexico | 191; 97; 94 | 183; 93; 90 | 188; 94; 94 | 562-14x | QB |
| 4 | Ana Beatriz Mariano; Caio Almeida | Brazil | 188; 90; 98 | 185; 88; 97 | 184; 91; 93 | 557-15x | QB |
| 5 | Ainoha Espinoza; Luis Delgado | Peru | 185; 94; 91 | 188; 91; 97 | 184; 91; 93 | 557-10x | |
| 6 | Anasoli Rodríguez; Douglas Gomez | Venezuela | 179; 88; 91 | 181; 89; 92 | 188; 94; 94 | 548-08x | |
| 7 | Juana Munevar; Ángel Ávila | Colombia | 181; 89; 92 | 181; 90; 91 | 182; 92; 90 | 544-06x | |
| 8 | Josefina Mella; Nicolás Colussi | Argentina | 186; 91; 95 | 175; 87; 88 | 181; 92; 89 | 542-09x | |
| 9 | Sneha Gupta; Nathan Lim | United States | 183; 93; 90 | 177; 81; 96 | 181; 85; 96 | 541-09x | |
| 10 | Melany Abreus; Carlos Herrera | Cuba | 179; 87; 92 | 181; 91; 90 | 180; 90; 90 | 540-05x | |
| 11 | Frida Aguilar; José Luis Gutiérrez | El Salvador | 178; 88; 90 | 184; 91; 93 | 175; 90; 85 | 537-07x | |
| 12 | Danica Grbac; Diego Parra | Chile | 178; 86; 92 | 178; 87; 91 | 180; 86; 94 | 536-09x | |
| 13 | Camila Maalouf; Thor Barcelos | Brazil | 177; 87; 90 | 176; 87; 89 | 182; 90; 92 | 535-07x | |
| 14 | Maryorith Rivas; Jonathan Caal | Guatemala | 180; 93; 87 | 175; 87; 88 | 139; 88; 51 | 494-07x | |
| | María Rosa Cardozo; Waldir Zaracho | Paraguay | | | | DNS | |

Final – August 12

| Rank | Athlete | Country | Total | Notes |
Gold Medal Match
| 1st place, gold medalist(s) | Suman Sanghera; Marcus Klemp | United States | 16 | |
| 2nd place, silver medalist(s) | Sofía Ibarra; Erick Ruiz | Mexico | 6 | |
Bronze Medal Match
| 3rd place, bronze medalist(s) | Ana Beatriz Mariano; Caio Almeida | Brazil | 17 | |
| 4 | Mia Rosales; Pedro Quintero | Mexico | 15 | |

=== Mixed team trap ===
Qualification round – August 12

| Rank | Athletes | Country | 1 | 2 | 3 | Total | Notes |
|---|---|---|---|---|---|---|---|
| 1 | Tony Meola; Carey Garrison | United States | 43; 20; 23 | 43; 22; 21 | 44; 23; 21 | 130 | QG |
| 2 | Kaleb Horinek; Ava Downs | United States | 34; 14; 20 | 45; 22; 23 | 43; 23; 20 | 122 | QG |
| 3 | Hussein Daruich; Ellen Mendes | Brazil | 34; 18; 16 | 38; 21; 17 | 32; 17; 15 | 104 | QB |
| 4 | Gianmarco Brol; Sofía Poveda | Guatemala | 30; 12; 18 | 28; 16; 12 | 29; 12; 17 | 87 | QB |

Final – August 12

| Rank | Athlete | Country | Total | Notes |
Gold Medal Match
| 1st place, gold medalist(s) | Tony Meola; Carey Garrison | United States | 39 | |
| 2nd place, silver medalist(s) | Kaleb Horinek; Ava Downs | United States | 37 | |
Bronze Medal Match
| 3rd place, bronze medalist(s) | Hussein Daruich; Ellen Mendes | Brazil | 40 | |
| 4 | Gianmarco Brol; Sofía Poveda | Guatemala | 30 | |
