= Badminton at the 2025 Junior Pan American Games =

Badminton at the 2025 Junior American Games
- Venue: SND Stadium
- Start date: August 10, 2025
- End date: August 13, 2025
- No. of events: 3 (1 men, 1 women, 1 mixed)
- Competitors: 64

The badminton events at the 2025 Junior Pan American Games were held at the SND Stadium in the Greater Asuncion area. The events were contested between August 10 and 13, 2025.

A total of three events (men's singles, women's singles and mixed doubles were contested. The winner of each singles event qualified for the 2027 Pan American Games in Lima, Peru.

== Qualification ==
A country's quota spots were determined using the BWF World Rankings as of March 4, 2025. A countries' rankings are determined by adding the points of the highest ranked player / team from each country in men's singles, women's singles and mixed doubles. Athletes must be 22 years of age or less to compete.

== Medal summary ==
=== Medal table ===
* Host nation (Paraguay)

Rank	Nation	Gold	Silver	Bronze	Total
1	Canada	2	1	0	3
2	Brazil	1	2	0	3
3	United States	0	0	4	4
4	Mexico	0	0	1	1
4	Peru	0	0	1	1
Totals (5 entries)		3	3	6	12

=== Medalists ===
Event	Gold	Silver	Bronze
Men's singles	Victor Lai; Canada	Deivid Silva; Brazil	Adriano Viale; Peru
Men's singles	Victor Lai; Canada	Deivid Silva; Brazil	Zicheng Xu; United States
Women's singles	Rachel Chan; Canada	Juliana Viana Vieira; Brazil	Ella Lin; United States
Women's singles	Rachel Chan; Canada	Juliana Viana Vieira; Brazil	Vanessa García; Mexico
Mixed doubles	Brazil; Davi Silva; Juliana Viana Vieira	Canada; Victor Lai; Rachel Chan	United States; Zicheng Xu; Ella Lin
Mixed doubles	Brazil; Davi Silva; Juliana Viana Vieira	Canada; Victor Lai; Rachel Chan	United States; Tian Zhang; Audrey Chang

== Results ==
The official draw was revealed on July 30, 2025.

=== Men's singles ===
Seeds

The following athletes were seeded:

1. Victor Lai (CAN)
2. Adriano Viale (PER)
3. Ramiro Alonso Espinoza (GUA)
4. Yeison Del Cid (GUA)
5. Javier Alas (ESA)
6. Nestor Gonzalez (MEX)
7. Deivid Silva (BRA)
8. Franco Motto (ARG)

Bracket

Date: August 10-13

Round of 32
Victor Lai (CAN)	2
Thiago Acha (PAR)	0
Judson Chilan (ECU)	2
Marcos Morales (PUR)	0
Franco Motto (ARG)	2
Frank Waddell (GUY)	0
Melvin Calzadilla (ESA)	0
Davi Silva (BRA)	2
Ramiro Alonso (GUA)	2
José María Rendon (PER)	1
Amir Mcbean (JAM)	1
Abrahan Gutiérrez (VEN)	2
Nestor Gonzalez (MEX)	2
Marc Marcano (TTO)	0
Leandro Gil (CUB)	0
Zicheng Xu (USA)	2
Joanathan Debidin (GUY)	0
Keyon'dre Mcbean (JAM)	2
Ricardo Torres (VEN)	0
Deivid Silva (BRA)	2
Juan Carlos Bencomo (CUB)	2
Sebastián Vásquez (CHI)	0
Gabriel Rosales (BOL)	0
Yeison Del Cid (GUA)	2
Mauricio Martínez (PAR)	WO
Maximiliano Peregrina (MEX)	0
Fran Benavides (CRC)	0
Javier Alas (ESA)	2
Tian Qi Zhang (USA)	2
Santiago Liotini (ARG)	0
Rivano Bisphan (SUR)	0
Adriano Viale (PER)	2

Round of 16
Victor Lai (CAN)	2
Judson Chilan (ECU)	0
Fanco Motto (ARG)	0
Davi Silva (BRA)	2
Ramiro Alonso (GUA)	2
Abrahan Gutiérrez (VEN)	0
Nestor Gonzalez (MEX)	0
Zicheng Xu (USA)	2
Keyon'dre Mcbean (JAM)	0
Deivid Silva (BRA)	2
Juan Carlos Bencomo (CUB)	1
Yeison Del Cid (GUA)	2
Mauricio Martínez (PAR)	0
Javier Alas (ESA)	2
Tian Qi Zhang (USA)	0
Adriano Viale (PER)	2

Quarterfinals
Victor Lai (CAN)	2
Davi Silva (BRA)	0
Ramiro Alonso (GUA)	0
Zicheng Xu (USA)	2
Deivid Silva (BRA)	2
Yeison Del Cid (GUA)	1
Javier Alas (ESA)	0
Adriano Viale (PER)	2

Semifinals
Victor Lai (CAN)	2
Zicheng Xu (USA)	0
Deivid Silva (BRA)	2
Adriano Viale (PER)	0

Final
Victor Lai (CAN)	2
Deivid Silva (BRA)	0

=== Women's singles ===
Seeds

The following athletes were seeded:

1. Juliana Viana Vieira (BRA)
2. Rachel Chan (CAN)
3. Adriana Barrios (GUA)
4. Vanessa García (MEX)
5. Iona Gualdi (ARG)
6. Ella Lin (USA)
7. Margareth Revelo (ESA)
8. Mariangel Garcia (VEN)

Bracket

Date: August 10-13

Round of 32
Juliana Viana Vieira (BRA)	2
Karianet Morales (PUR)	0
Brenda Garrido (PAR)	2
Sabrina Beharry (GUY)	0
Mariangel García (VEN)	2
T'shelle Barnes (TTO)	0
Vania Díaz (CHI)	2
Mustafaa Mustafaa (JAM)	0
Adriana Barrios (GUA)	1
Taisia Kasianov (PER)	2
Alina Sanz (CUB)	0
Ailen Oliva (ARG)	2
Ella Lin (USA)	2
Sion Zeegelaar (SUR)	0
Daniela Hernandez (ESA)	1
Miriam Rodríguez (MEX)	2
Sofía Junco (PER)	1
Juliana Murosaki (BRA)	2
Alison Jimenez (CRC)	0
Ioana Gualdi (ARG)	2
Sofía Rodas (PAR)	2
Verónica Condori (BOL)	0
Leyanis Contreras (CUB)	0
Vanessa García (MEX)	2
Fatima Gutiérrez (GUA)	0
Audrey Chang (USA)	2
Leshaunte Berkley (GUY)	0
Margareth Revelo (ESA)	2
Breanna Bisnott (JAM)	2
Amara Urqhart (TTO)	0
María Rojas (VEN)	0
Rachel Chan (CAN)	2

Round of 16
Juliana Viana Vieira (BRA)	2
Brenda Garrido (PAR)	0
Mariangel García (VEN)	2
Vania Díaz (CHI)	0
Taisia Kasianov (PER)	0
Ailen Oliva (ARG)	2
Ella Lin (USA)	2
Miriam Rodríguez (MEX)	0
Juliana Murosaki (BRA)	2
Iona Gualdi (ARG)	1
Sofía Rodas (PAR)	0
Vanessa García (MEX)	2
Audrey Chang (USA)	2
Margareth Revelo (ESA)	0
Breanna Bisnott (JAM)	0
Rachel Chan (CAN)	2

Quarterfinals
Juliana Viana Vieira (BRA)	2
Mariangel García (VEN)	0
Ailen Oliva (ARG)	0
Ella Lin (USA)	2
Juliana Murosaki (BRA)	0
Vanessa García (MEX)	2
Audrey Chang (USA)	0
Rachel Chan (CAN)	2

Semifinals
Juliana Viana Vieira (BRA)	2
Ella Lin (USA)	0
Mariangel García (VEN)	0
Rachel Chan (CAN)	2

Final
Juliana Viana Vieira (BRA)	0
Rachel Chan (CAN)	2

=== Mixed doubles ===
Seeds

The following pairs were seeded:

1. Yeison Del Cid / Adriana Barrios (GUA)
2. Nestor Gonzalez / Vanessa García (MEX)
3. Maximiliano Peregrina / Miriam Rodriguez (MEX)
4. Rivano Bisphan / Sion Zeegelaar (SUR)

Bracket

Date: August 10-13

Round of 32
Leyanis Contreras (CUB); Juan Carlos Bencomo (CUB)	2
Fran Benavides (CRC); Alison Jimenez (CRC)	0
Brenda Garrido (PAR); Thiago Acha (PAR)	0
Ricardo Torres (VEN); Mariangel García (VEN)	2
Rachel Chan (CAN); Victor Lai (CAN)	WO
Mishka Lavanya (GUY); Frank Waddell (GUY)	0
Miriam Rodríguez (MEX); Maximiliano Peregrina (MEX)	0
Iona Gualdi (ARG); Franco Motto (ARG)	WO
Juliana Murosaki (BRA); Deivid Silva (BRA)	2
Daniela Hernandez (ESA); Javier Alas (ESA)	0
Audrey Chang (USA); Tian Qi Zhang (USA)	2
Keyon'dre Mcbean (JAM); Mustafaa Mustafaa (JAM)	0
Taisia Kasianov (PER); José María Rendon (PER)	2
Marcos Morales (PUR); Karianet Morales (PUR)	0
Margareth Revelo (ESA); Melvin Calzadilla (ESA)	0
Adriano Viale (PER); Sofía Junco (PER)	2
Ailen Oliva (ARG); Santiago Liotini (ARG)	2
Vania Díaz (CHI); Sebastián Vásquez (CHI)	0
Davi Silva (BRA); Juliana Viana Vieira (BRA)	WO
Leshaunte Berkley (GUY); Joanathan Debidin (GUY)	0
Gabriel Rosales (BOL); Verónica Condori (BOL)	0
Sion Zeegelaar (SUR); Rivano Bisphan (SUR)	2
Leandro Gil (CUB); Alina Sanz (CUB)	0
Mauricio Martínez (PAR); Sofía Rodas (PAR)	2
Amir Mcbean (JAM); Breanna Bisnott (JAM)	0
Fatima Gutiérrez (GUA); Ramiro Alonso (GUA)	2
María Rojas (VEN); Abrahan Gutiérrez (VEN)	0
Ella Lin (USA); Zicheng Xu (USA)	2
Amara Urqhart (TTO); Marc Marcano (TTO)	0
Nestor Gonzalez (MEX); Vanessa García (MEX)	2

Round of 16
Adriana Barrios (GUA); Yeison Del Cid (GUA)	2
Leyanis Contreras (CUB); Juan Carlos Bencomo (CUB)	0
Ricardo Torres (VEN); Mariangel García (VEN)	0
Rachel Chan (CAN); Victor Lai (CAN)	2
Iona Gualdi (ARG); Franco Motto (ARG)	0
Juliana Murosaki (BRA); Deivid Silva (BRA)	2
Audrey Chang (USA); Tian Qi Zhang (USA)	2
Taisia Kasianov (PER); José María Rendon (PER)	0
Adriano Viale (PER); Sofía Junco (PER)	2
Ailen Oliva (ARG); Santiago Liotini (ARG)	0
Davi Silva (BRA); Juliana Viana Vieira (BRA)	2
Sion Zeegelaar (SUR); Rivano Bisphan (SUR)	0
Mauricio Martínez (PAR); Sofía Rodas (PAR)	0
Fatima Gutiérrez (GUA); Ramiro Alonso (GUA)	2
Ella Lin (USA); Zicheng Xu (USA)	2
Nestor Gonzalez (MEX); Vanessa García (MEX)	0

Quarterfinals
Adriana Barrios (GUA); Yeison Del Cid (GUA)	0
Rachel Chan (CAN); Victor Lai (CAN)	2
Juliana Murosaki (BRA); Deivid Silva (BRA)	0
Audrey Chang (USA); Tian Qi Zhang (USA)	2
Adriano Viale (PER); Sofía Junco (PER)	0
Davi Silva (BRA); Juliana Viana Vieira (BRA)	2
Fatima Gutiérrez (GUA); Ramiro Alonso (GUA)	0
Ella Lin (USA); Zicheng Xu (USA)	2

Semifinals
Rachel Chan (CAN); Victor Lai (CAN)	2
Audrey Chang (USA); Tian Qi Zhang (USA)	1
Davi Silva (BRA); Juliana Viana Vieira (BRA)	2
Ella Lin (USA); Zicheng Xu (USA)	1

Final
Rachel Chan (CAN); Victor Lai (CAN)	1
Davi Silva (BRA); Juliana Viana Vieira (BRA)	2
