= Water skiing at the 2025 Junior Pan American Games =

Water skiing at the 2025 Junior American Games
- Water skiing and wakeboarding pictograms
- Venue: Manene Lake
- Start date: August 18, 2025
- End date: August 21, 2025
- No. of events: 10

The water skiing and wakeboarding events at the 2025 Junior Pan American Games were held at Manene Lake in Ypacaraí. The events were contested between August 18 and 21, 2025. Water skiing was one of the six disciplines added for the 2025 games.

Ten events were contested, five for men and five for women. The winner of each event qualified for the 2027 Pan American Games in Lima, Peru.

== Qualification ==
Qualification was based on the results from the 2024 IWWF Pan American Ski Championship, held in Bogotá, Colombia, and the 2024 IWWF Pan American Wakeboard Championship, held in Auburndale, United States.

== Medal summary ==
=== Medal table ===
* Host nation (Paraguay)

Rank	Nation	Gold	Silver	Bronze	Total
1	United States	5	2	3	10
2	Canada	2	0	3	5
3	Chile	1	3	0	4
4	Argentina	1	2	1	4
5	Mexico	1	1	2	4
6	Colombia	0	2	1	3
Totals (6 entries)		10	10	10	30

=== Medalists ===
==== Men ====
Event	Gold	Silver	Bronze
Slalom	Charles Ross; Canada	Bautista Ahumada; Argentina	Jaime Palomino; Mexico
Tricks	Jake Abelson; United States	Matías González; Chile	Pablo Font; Mexico
Jump	Francisco Giorgis; Argentina	Jake Abelson; United States	Jacob Chambers; Canada
Overall	Jake Abelson; United States	Francisco Giorgis; Argentina	Jacob Chambers; Canada
Wakeboard	Diego Monsalve; Mexico	Felipe Mejía; Colombia	Ezra O'Neal; United States

==== Women ====
Event	Gold	Silver	Bronze
Slalom	Emilia Méndez; Chile	Daniela Kretschmer; Chile	Alexia Abelson; United States
Tricks	Alexia Abelson; United States	Daniela Verswyvel; Colombia	Hannah Stopnicki; Canada
Jump	Kate Pinsonneault; Canada	Emilia Méndez; Chile	Emma Davis; United States
Overall	Alexia Abelson; United States	Emma Davis; United States	Daniela Verswyvel; Colombia
Wakeboard	Kitt Smith; United States	Fernanda Larios; Mexico	Lucrecia Amoroso; Argentina

== Results ==
=== Men's slalom ===
Preliminary round – August 18

Rank	Name	Country	Result	Notes
1	Charles Ross	Canada	0.00/58/9.75	Q
2	Jaeden Eade	United States	4.50/58/10.75	Q
3	Bautista Ahumada	Argentina	3.00/58/10.75	Q
4	Jaime Palomino	Mexico	2.50/58/10.75	Q
5	Andrea Pigozzi	Dominican Republic	5.00/58/11.25	Q
6	Pablo Alvira	Colombia	2.00/58/11.25	Q
6	Matías González	Chile	2.00/58/11.25	Q
8	Jake Abelson	United States	1.50/58/11.25	Q
9	Sebastian Muñoz	Colombia	1.00/58/11.25	
10	Paolo Pigozzi	Dominican Republic	4.50/58/12.00	
11	Jacob Chambers	Canada	1.50/58/12.00	
11	Francisco Giorgis	Argentina	1.50/58/12.00	
13	Raul Ignacio Codas	Paraguay	2.00/58/13.00	
14	Philipe Martin Hon	Brazil	0.50/58/13.00	
15	Diego José Tejada	Peru	3.00/58/14.25	
16	Fernando Codas	Paraguay	0.50/58/14.25	
17	Pablo Font	Mexico	3.00/58/18.25	

Final – August 20

Rank	Name	Country	Result	Notes
1st place, gold medalist(s)	Charles Ross	Canada	4.00/58/10.25	
2nd place, silver medalist(s)	Bautista Ahumada	Argentina	2.00/58/10.75	
3rd place, bronze medalist(s)	Jaime Palomino	Mexico	1.50/58/10.75	
4	Jaeden Eade	United States	4.00/58/11.25	
5	Jake Abelson	United States	3.00/58/11.25	
6	Andrea Pigozzi	Dominican Republic	2.00/58/11.25	
7	Pablo Alvira	Colombia	0.50/58/11.25	
8	Matías González	Chile	3.50/58/12.00	

=== Men's tricks ===
Preliminary round – August 20

Rank	Name	Country	Result	Notes
1	Jake Abelson	United States	12090	Q
2	Matías González	Chile	11860	Q
3	Pablo Font	Mexico	10390	Q
4	Bautista Ahumada	Argentina	9600	Q
5	Francisco Giorgis	Argentina	8670	Q
6	Jacob Chambers	Canada	7210	Q
7	Pablo Alvira	Colombia	6210	Q
8	Jaeden Eade	United States	4120	Q
9	Sebastian Muñoz	Colombia	3830	
10	Paolo Pigozzi	Dominican Republic	3310	
11	Raul Ignacio Codas	Paraguay	2730	
12	Fernando Codas	Paraguay	1520	
13	Diego José Tejada	Peru	1080	
14	Jaime Palomino	Mexico	960	
15	Andrea Pigozzi	Dominican Republic	200	

Final – August 20

Rank	Name	Country	Result	Notes
1st place, gold medalist(s)	Jake Abelson	United States	12400	
2nd place, silver medalist(s)	Matías González	Chile	12280	
3rd place, bronze medalist(s)	Pablo Font	Mexico	10390	
4	Pablo Alvira	Colombia	6680	
5	Bautista Ahumada	Argentina	6480	
6	Jacob Chambers	Canada	6170	
7	Francisco Giorgis	Argentina	4620	
8	Jaeden Eade	United States	2750	

=== Men's jump ===
Preliminary round – August 18

Rank	Name	Country	Result	Notes
1	Jake Abelson	United States	57.1	Q
2	Francisco Giorgis	Argentina	55.8	Q
3	Jacob Chambers	Canada	53.3	Q
4	Jaeden Eade	United States	50.5	Q
5	Sebastian Muñoz	Colombia	45.8	Q
6	Andrea Pigozzi	Dominican Republic	43.7	Q
7	Paolo Pigozzi	Dominican Republic	42.8	
8	Raul Ignacio Codas	Paraguay	23.4	
9	Diego José Tejada	Peru	16.9	
10	Matías González	Chile	0.0	

Final – August 20

Rank	Name	Country	Result	Notes
1st place, gold medalist(s)	Francisco Giorgis	Argentina	54.6	
2nd place, silver medalist(s)	Jake Abelson	United States	53.6	
3rd place, bronze medalist(s)	Jacob Chambers	Canada	52.2	
4	Jaeden Eade	United States	51.8	
5	Andrea Pigozzi	Dominican Republic	48.7	
6	Sebastian Muñoz	Colombia	43.7	

=== Men's overall ===
Preliminary round – August 21 / Final – August 21

Rank	Athlete	Country	Preliminary Round					Final			
Rank	Athlete	Country	Slalom	Tricks	Jump	Total	R	Slalom	Jump	Tricks	Total
1st place, gold medalist(s)	Jake Abelson	United States	828.57	1000.00	1000.00	2,828.57	1	875.00	1000.00	1000.00	2875.00
2nd place, silver medalist(s)	Francisco Giorgis	Argentina	714.29	717.12	959.50	2,390.91	2	750.00	738.69	979.38	2468.07
3rd place, bronze medalist(s)	Jacob Chambers	Canada	714.29	596.36	881.62	2,192.27	3	826.92	599.26	927.84	2354.02
4	Jaeden Eade	United States	1000.00	340.78	794.39	2,135.17	4	1000.00	315.79	883.16	2198.95
5	Sebastian Muñoz	Colombia	819.05	316.79	647.98	1,783.82	6	846.15	357.34	725.09	1928.58
6	Matías González	Chile	838.10	980.98	0.00	1,819.08	5	DNS			
7	Bautista Ahumada	Argentina	971.43	794.04	0.00	1,765.47	7	Did not advance			
8	Paolo Pigozzi	Dominican Republic	771.43	273.78	554.52	1,599.73	8	Did not advance			
9	Andrea Pigozzi	Dominican Republic	895.24	16.54	582.55	1,494.33	9	Did not advance			
10	Pablo Alvira	Colombia	838.10	513.65	0.00	1,351.75	10	Did not advance			
11	Pablo Font	Mexico	285.71	859.39	0.00	1,145.10	11	Did not advance			
12	Jaime Palomino	Mexico	961.90	79.40	0.00	1,041.30	12	Did not advance			
13	Raul Ignacio Codas	Paraguay	609.52	225.81	0.00	835.33	13	Did not advance			
14	Diego José Tejada	Peru	514.29	89.33	0.00	603.62	14	Did not advance			
15	Fernando Codas	Paraguay	466.67	125.72	0.00	592.39	15	Did not advance			

=== Men's wakeboard ===
Heats – August 19

Rank	Name	Country	Result	Notes
Heat 1
1	Diego Monsalve	Mexico	81.11	Q
2	Felipe Mejía	Colombia	65.56	Q
3	Tobias Saidel	Argentina	60.00	L
4	Kord Holscher	Chile	37.00	L
Heat 2
1	Ezra O'Neal	United States	69.00	Q
2	Jakob Taylor	Canada	62.56	Q
3	Camilo Corrales	Paraguay	40.33	L
4	Antonio Vasconcelos	Brazil	32.45	L

Last Chance Qualifiers – August 20

Rank	Name	Country	Result	Notes
1	Tobias Saidel	Argentina	58.78	Q
2	Kord Holscher	Chile	48.67	Q
3	Antonio Vasconcelos	Brazil	45.00	
4	Camilo Corrales	Paraguay	44.22	

Final – August 21

Rank	Name	Country	Result	Notes
1st place, gold medalist(s)	Diego Monsalve	Mexico	85.67	
2nd place, silver medalist(s)	Felipe Mejía	Colombia	74.33	
3rd place, bronze medalist(s)	Ezra O'Neal	United States	64.33	
4	Tobias Saidel	Argentina	60.44	
5	Jakob Taylor	Canada	42.44	
6	Kord Holscher	Chile	20.00	

=== Women's slalom ===
Preliminary round – August 18

Rank	Name	Country	Result	Notes
1	Daniela Kretschmer	Chile	3.00/55/11.25	Q
2	Alexia Abelson	United States	2.50/55/11.25	Q
3	Emilia Méndez	Chile	2.00/55/11.25	Q, 4.00
5	Emma Davis	United States	5.50/55/12.00	Q
6	Kate Pinsonneault	Canada	4.00/55/12.00	Q
7	Hannah Stopnicki	Canada	2.00/55/12.00	Q
8	Daniela Verswyvel	Colombia	1.00/55/12.00	Q
9	Martina Piedrahita	Colombia	3.00/55/13.00	Q
4	Trinidad Espinal	Chile	2.00/55/11.25	3.50
10	Constanza Codas	Paraguay	2.50/55/16.00	
10	Delfina Renosto	Argentina	2.50/55/16.00	
12	Isabella Valero	Argentina	4.50/55/18.25	
13	Aleska Musiris	Peru	1.00/55/18.25	
14	Ileana Velazquez	Paraguay	4.00/52/18.25	
15	Isabela Giusti	Brazil	3.00/52/18.25	

Final – August 20

Rank	Name	Country	Result	Notes
1st place, gold medalist(s)	Emilia Méndez	Chile	3.00/55/11.25	1.50
2nd place, silver medalist(s)	Daniela Kretschmer	Chile	3.00/55/11.25	1.00
3rd place, bronze medalist(s)	Alexia Abelson	United States	1.00/55/11.25	
4	Emma Davis	United States	1.00/55/11.25	
5	Kate Pinsonneault	Canada	2.50/55/12.00	
6	Hannah Stopnicki	Canada	2.00/55/13.00	
7	Daniela Verswyvel	Colombia	2.00/55/13.00	
8	Martina Piedrahita	Colombia	2.00/55/13.00	

=== Women's tricks ===
Preliminary round – August 20

Rank	Name	Country	Result	Notes
1	Daniela Verswyvel	Colombia	8280	Q
2	Alexia Abelson	United States	7730	Q
3	Emma Davis	United States	7140	Q
4	Hannah Stopnicki	Canada	6660	Q
5	Delfina Renosto	Argentina	5370	Q
6	Martina Piedrahita	Colombia	4490	Q
7	Kate Pinsonneault	Canada	4050	Q
8	Aleska Musiris	Peru	2650	Q
9	Trinidad Espinal	Chile	1040	
10	Isabella Valero	Argentina	920	
11	Ileana Velazquez	Paraguay	840	
12	Constanza Codas	Paraguay	450	
13	Emilia Méndez	Chile	370	

Final – August 20

Rank	Name	Country	Result	Notes
1st place, gold medalist(s)	Alexia Abelson	United States	8370	
2nd place, silver medalist(s)	Daniela Verswyvel	Colombia	8180	
3rd place, bronze medalist(s)	Hannah Stopnicki	Canada	7640	
4	Emma Davis	United States	7290	
5	Delfina Renosto	Argentina	5460	
6	Kate Pinsonneault	Canada	4050	
7	Martina Piedrahita	Colombia	3600	
8	Aleska Musiris	Peru	2490	

=== Women's jump ===
Preliminary round – August 18

Rank	Name	Country	Result	Notes
1	Kate Pinsonneault	Canada	42.5	Q
2	Emilia Méndez	Chile	39.4	Q
3	Emma Davis	United States	35.1	Q
4	Martina Piedrahita	Colombia	33.8	Q
5	Daniela Verswyvel	Colombia	33.4	Q
6	Alexia Abelson	United States	28.7	Q
7	Isabella Valero	Argentina	27.4	
8	Constanza Codas	Paraguay	15.7	
	Aleska Musiris	Peru	DNS	

Final – August 20

Rank	Name	Country	Result	Notes
1st place, gold medalist(s)	Kate Pinsonneault	Canada	41.9	
2nd place, silver medalist(s)	Emilia Méndez	Chile	39.4	
3rd place, bronze medalist(s)	Emma Davis	United States	34.7	
4	Martina Piedrahita	Colombia	34.7	
5	Daniela Verswyvel	Colombia	33.5	
6	Alexia Abelson	United States	29.4	

=== Women's overall ===
Preliminary round – August 21 / Final – August 21

Rank	Athlete	Country	Preliminary Round					Final			
Rank	Athlete	Country	Slalom	Tricks	Jump	Total	R	Slalom	Jump	Tricks	Total
1st place, gold medalist(s)	Alexia Abelson	United States	1000.00	933.57	458.82	2,392.39	3	1000.00	1000.00	484.73	2484.73
2nd place, silver medalist(s)	Emma Davis	United States	932.58	862.32	709.80	2,504.70	1	955.56	748.54	702.29	2406.39
3rd place, bronze medalist(s)	Daniela Verswyvel	Colombia	831.46	1000.00	643.14	2,474.60	2	688.89	969.73	599.24	2257.86
4	Kate Pinsonneault	Canada	898.88	489.13	1000.00	2,388.01	4	555.56	459.84	1000.00	2015.40
5	Martina Piedrahita	Colombia	741.57	542.27	658.82	1,942.66	5	588.89	522.70	610.69	1722.28
6	Emilia Méndez	Chile	988.76	44.69	878.43	1,911.88	6	766.67	33.76	790.08	1590.51
7	Hannah Stopnicki	Canada	853.93	804.35	0.00	1,658.28	7	Did not advance			
8	Delfina Renosto	Argentina	460.67	648.55	0.00	1,109.22	8	Did not advance			
9	Isabella Valero	Argentina	370.79	111.11	407.84	889.74	9	Did not advance			
10	Aleska Musiris	Peru	292.13	320.05	0.00	612.18	10	Did not advance			
11	Constanza Codas	Paraguay	460.67	54.35	0.00	515.02	11	Did not advance			
12	Ileana Velazquez	Paraguay	224.72	101.45	0.00	326.17	12	Did not advance			

=== Women's wakeboard ===
Heats – August 19

Rank	Name	Country	Result	Notes
Heat 1
1	Ignacia Holscher	Chile	69.44	Q
2	Fernanda Larios	Mexico	68.33	Q
3	Lucrecia Amoroso	Argentina	35.00	L
4	Baye Hoctor-Duncan	Canada	10.00	L
Heat 2
1	Kitt Smith	United States	61.11	Q
2	Livia Sophia Schuler	Brazil	41.67	Q
3	Victoria Manoiloff	Paraguay	20.00	L
4	Camila Ramírez	Colombia	1.67	L

Last Chance Qualifiers – August 20

Rank	Name	Country	Result	Notes
1	Camila Ramírez	Colombia	44.11	Q
2	Lucrecia Amoroso	Argentina	40.22	Q
3	Baye Hoctor-Duncan	Canada	33.67	
4	Victoria Manoiloff	Paraguay	25.56	

Final – August 21

Rank	Name	Country	Result	Notes
1st place, gold medalist(s)	Kitt Smith	United States	82.22	
2nd place, silver medalist(s)	Fernanda Larios	Mexico	71.67	
3rd place, bronze medalist(s)	Lucrecia Amoroso	Argentina	50.00	
4	Camila Ramírez	Colombia	45.89	
5	Ignacia Holscher	Chile	31.78	
6	Livia Sophia Schuler	Brazil	24.44	
