= Table tennis at the 2025 Junior Pan American Games =

Table tennis at the 2025 Junior American Games
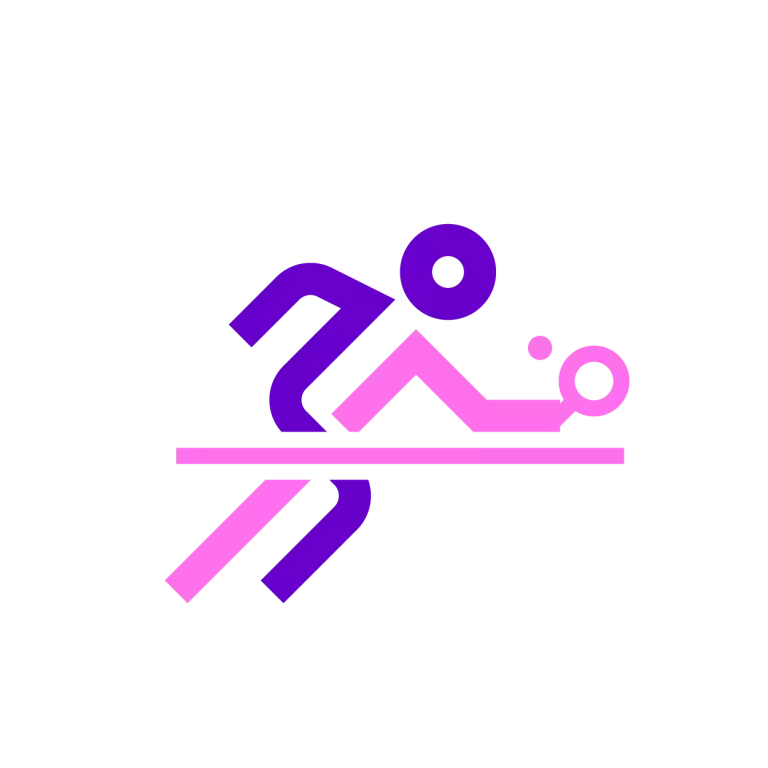
- Venue: Table Tennis Stadium
- Start date: August 16, 2025
- End date: August 22, 2025
- No. of events: 7 (3 men, 3 women, 1 mixed)

The table tennis events at the 2025 Junior Pan American Games were held at the Table Tennis Stadium in the SND Complex in Asunción. The event were contested between August 16 and 22, 2025.

A total of seven events were contested. The winner of each singles event qualified for the 2027 Pan American Games in Lima, Peru.

== Medal summary ==
=== Medal table ===
* Host nation (Paraguay)

Rank	Nation	Gold	Silver	Bronze	Total
1	Brazil	3	2	1	6
2	United States	2	1	2	5
3	Puerto Rico	1	3	3	7
4	Venezuela	1	0	1	2
5	Canada	0	1	3	4
6	Colombia	0	0	2	2
7	Dominican Republic	0	0	1	1
7	Ecuador	0	0	1	1
Totals (8 entries)		7	7	14	28

=== Medalists ===
Event	Gold	Silver	Bronze
Men's singles	Nandan Naresh; United States	Leonardo Iizuka; Brazil	Steven Moreno; Puerto Rico
Men's singles	Nandan Naresh; United States	Leonardo Iizuka; Brazil	Ramón Vila; Dominican Republic
Men's doubles	Brazil; Felipe Arado; Leonardo Iizuka	United States; Nandan Naresh; Victor Ying Xie	Canada; Laurent Jutras-Vigneault; Kenny Ly
Men's doubles	Brazil; Felipe Arado; Leonardo Iizuka	United States; Nandan Naresh; Victor Ying Xie	Ecuador; Cesar Revelo; Joshua Robayo
Men's team	Brazil; Felipe Arado; Leonardo Iizuka	Puerto Rico; Steven Moreno; Enrique Rios	United States; Nandan Naresh; Victor Ying Xie
Men's team	Brazil; Felipe Arado; Leonardo Iizuka	Puerto Rico; Steven Moreno; Enrique Rios	Venezuela; Carlos Ríos; Jesus Tovar
Women's singles	Edmarie Leon; Puerto Rico	Natalie Chan; Canada	Jessie Xu; Canada
Women's singles	Edmarie Leon; Puerto Rico	Natalie Chan; Canada	Ana Isaza; Colombia
Women's doubles	Brazil; Beatriz Fiore; Karina Shiray	Puerto Rico; Edmarie Leon; Kristal Melendez	Canada; Natalie Chan; Jessie Xu
Women's doubles	Brazil; Beatriz Fiore; Karina Shiray	Puerto Rico; Edmarie Leon; Kristal Melendez	United States; Satya Aspathi; Tashiya Piyadasa
Women's team	United States; Satya Aspathi; Tashiya Piyadasa	Brazil; Beatriz Fiore; Karina Shiray	Colombia; Ana Isaza; Mariana Rodríguez
Women's team	United States; Satya Aspathi; Tashiya Piyadasa	Brazil; Beatriz Fiore; Karina Shiray	Puerto Rico; Edmarie Leon; Kristal Melendez
Mixed doubles	Venezuela; Carlos Ríos; Dakota Ferrer	Puerto Rico; Enrique Rios; Kristal Melendez	Puerto Rico; Steven Moreno; Edmarie Leon
Mixed doubles	Venezuela; Carlos Ríos; Dakota Ferrer	Puerto Rico; Enrique Rios; Kristal Melendez	Brazil; Felipe Arado; Karina Shiray

== Results ==
=== Men's singles ===
Date: August 16–18

Round of 32
N Naresh (USA)	4
S Aviles (CRC)	0
E Martin (MEX)	1
I Pastore (PAR)	4
N Callaba (ARG)	4
R Cabrera (DOM)	2
F Molina (ESA)	0
F Arado (BRA)	4
S Bedoya (COL)	4
L Carrillo (GUA)	1
A Martínez (CUB)	4
C Revelo (ECU)	2
J Tovar (VEN)	4
M Eleuthere (LCA)	1
K Ly (CAN)	0
S Moreno (PUR)	4
L Iizuka (BRA)	4
J Lubin (LCA)	0
J Buenrostro (MEX)	4
L Jutras (CAN)	0
A Bertolo (PAR)	4
A Montoya (CRC)	1
T Alin (ARG)	2
J Robayo (ECU)	4
C Ríos (VEN)	4
A Amaya (ESA)	0
A Maqueira (CUB)	0
V Xie (USA)	4
R Vila (DOM)	4
J Castaño (COL)	0
R Gatica (GUA)	0
E Ríos (PUR)	4

Round of 16
N Naresh (USA)	4
I Pastore (PAR)	0
N Callaba (ARG)	0
F Arado (BRA)	4
S Bedoya (COL)	4
A Martínez (CUB)	0
J Tovar (VEN)	0
S Moreno (PUR)	4
L Iizuka (BRA)	4
J Buenrostro (MEX)	0
A Bertolo (PAR)	3
J Robayo (ECU)	4
C Ríos (VEN)	3
V Xie (USA)	4
R Vila (DOM)	4
E Ríos (PUR)	2

Quarterfinals
N Naresh (USA)	4
F Arado (BRA)	1
S Bedoya (COL)	3
S Moreno (PUR)	4
L Iizuka (BRA)	4
J Robayo (ECU)	1
V Xie (USA)	1
R Vila (DOM)	4

Semifinals
N Naresh (USA)	4
S Moreno (PUR)	1
L Iizuka (BRA)	4
R Vila (DOM)	3

Final
N Naresh (USA)	4
L Iizuka (BRA)	2

=== Men's doubles ===
Date: August 16–18

Round of 16
E Ríos (PUR); S Moreno (PUR)	2
K Ly (CAN); L Jutras (CAN)	3
J Buenrostro (MEX); E Martin (MEX)	3
J Castaño (COL); S Bedoya (COL)	2
A Bertolo (PAR); I Pastore (PAR)	3
M Eleuthere (LCA); J Lubin (LCA)	0
S Aviles (CRC); A Montoya (CRC)	1
N Naresh (USA); V Xie (USA)	3
J Tovar (VEN); C Ríos (VEN)	0
N Callaba (ARG); T Alin (ARG)	3
A Maqueira (CUB); A Martínez (CUB)	2
C Revelo (ECU); J Robayo (ECU)	3
R Vila (DOM); R Cabrera (DOM)	3
A Amaya (ESA); F Molina (ESA)	0
R Gatica (GUA); L Carrillo (GUA)	0
F Arado (BRA); L Iizuka (BRA)	3

Quarterfinals
K Ly (CAN); L Jutras (CAN)	3
J Buenrostro (MEX); E Martin (MEX)	0
A Bertolo (PAR); I Pastore (PAR)	0
N Naresh (USA); V Xie (USA)	3
N Callaba (ARG); T Alin (ARG)	2
C Revelo (ECU); J Robayo (ECU)	3
R Vila (DOM); R Cabrera (DOM)	2
F Arado (BRA); L Iizuka (BRA)	3

Semifinals
K Ly (CAN); L Jutras (CAN)	1
N Naresh (USA); V Xie (USA)	3
C Revelo (ECU); J Robayo (ECU)	0
F Arado (BRA); L Iizuka (BRA)	3

Final
N Naresh (USA); V Xie (USA)	0
F Arado (BRA); L Iizuka (BRA)	3

=== Men's team ===
Date: August 20–21

Quarterfinals
Brazil	3
Paraguay	0
Cuba	2
Venezuela	3
United States	3
Colombia	1
Argentina	0
Puerto Rico	3

Semifinals
Brazil	3
Venezuela	1
United States	1
Puerto Rico	3

Final
Brazil	3
Puerto Rico	0

=== Women's singles ===
Date: August 16–18

Round of 32
E León (PUR)	4
K Mendoza (PER)	1
A Corado (GUA)	1
M Rodríguez (COL)	4
K Anchundia (ECU)	3
M Aguilar (MEX)	4
M Araya (CRC)	0
D Ferrer (VEN)	4
T Piyadasa (USA)	4
P Rivarola (PAR)	1
A Estrella (DOM)	2
C Fraser (TTO)	4
J Xu (CAN)	4
S Muñoz (ESA)	1
E Domínguez (CUB)	0
B Fiore (BRA)	4
S Kashyap (ANT)	4
C Castillo (ESA)	0
A Capote (CUB)	1
L Zavaleta (CRC)	4
A Isaza (COL)	4
J Thong (TTO)	0
J Cux (GUA)	0
N Aquije (PER)	4
A Arellano (ECU)	4
D Sosa (DOM)	0
X Figueroa (MEX)	0
S Aspathi (USA)	4
N Chan (CAN)	4
L Arzamendia (PAR)	0
K Melendez (PUR)	4
K Shinay (BRA)	2

Round of 16
E León (PUR)	4
M Rodríguez (COL)	1
M Aguilar (MEX)	1
D Ferrer (VEN)	4
T Piyadasa (USA)	4
C Fraser (TTO)	0
J Xu (CAN)	4
B Fiore (BRA)	2
S Kashyap (ANT)	3
L Zavaleta (CRC)	4
A Isaza (COL)	4
N Aquije (PER)	0
A Arellano (ECU)	4
S Aspathi (USA)	2
N Chan (CAN)	4
K Melendez (PUR)	1

Quarterfinals
E León (PUR)	4
D Ferrer (VEN)	2
T Piyadasa (USA)	2
J Xu (CAN)	4
L Zavaleta (CRC)	1
A Isaza (COL)	4
A Arellano (ECU)	0
N Chan (CAN)	4

Semifinals
E León (PUR)	4
J Xu (CAN)	0
A Isaza (COL)	2
N Chan (CAN)	4

Final
E León (PUR)	4
N Chan (CAN)	0

=== Women's doubles ===
Date: August 16–18

Round of 16
D Sosa (DOM); A Estrella (DOM)	3
N Aquije (PER); K Mendoza (PER)	2
J Xu (CAN); N Chan (CAN)	3
A Capote (CUB); E Domínguez (CUB)	0
A Corado (GUA); J Cux (GUA)	2
A Arellano (ECU); K Anchundia (ECU)	3
T Piyadasa (USA); S Aspathi (USA)	3
X Figueroa (MEX); M Aguilar (MEX)	2
C Castillo (ESA); S Muñoz (ESA)	2
C Fraser (TTO); J Thong (TTO)	3
A Isaza (COL); M Rodríguez (COL)	3
L Zavaleta (CRC); M Araya (CRC)	0
L Arzamendia (PAR); P Rivarola (PAR)	0
K Melendez (PUR); E León (PUR)	3

Quarterfinals
K Shinay (BRA); B Fiore (BRA)	3
D Sosa (DOM); A Estrella (DOM)	1
J Xu (CAN); N Chan (CAN)	3
A Arellano (ECU); K Anchundia (ECU)	2
T Piyadasa (USA); S Aspathi (USA)	3
C Fraser (TTO); J Thong (TTO)	0
A Isaza (COL); M Rodríguez (COL)	1
K Melendez (PUR); E León (PUR)	3

Semifinals
K Shinay (BRA); B Fiore (BRA)	3
J Xu (CAN); N Chan (CAN)	2
T Piyadasa (USA); S Aspathi (USA)	1
K Melendez (PUR); E León (PUR)	3

Final
K Shinay (BRA); B Fiore (BRA)	3
K Melendez (PUR); E León (PUR)	2

=== Women's team ===
Date: August 20–21

Quarterfinals
United States	3
Ecuador	0
Canada	1
Puerto Rico	3
Colombia	3
Costa Rica	1
Peru	0
Brazil	3

Semifinals
United States	3
Puerto Rico	2
Colombia	0
Brazil	3

Final
United States	3
Brazil	1

=== Mixed doubles ===
Date: August 16–18

Round of 32
A Corado (GUA); L Carrillo (GUA)	1
S Aviles (CRC); L Zavaleta (CRC)	3
S Aspathi (USA); V Xie (USA)	3
J Castaño (COL); M Rodríguez (COL)	0
M Aguilar (MEX); E Martin (MEX)	0
J Robayo (ECU); A Arellano (ECU)	3
D Ferrer (VEN); C Ríos (VEN)	3
A Maqueira (CUB); E Domínguez (CUB)	1
D Sosa (DOM); R Cabrera (DOM)	3
L Arzamendia (PAR); I Pastore (PAR)	1
L Jutras (CAN); J Xu (CAN)	3
A Amaya (ESA); S Muñoz (ESA)	0
X Figueroa (MEX); J Buenrostro (MEX)	3
C Revelo (ECU); K Anchundia (ECU)	0
R Vila (DOM); A Estrella (DOM)	3
F Molina (ESA); C Castillo (ESA)	1
J Cux (GUA); R Gatica (GUA)	1
A Isaza (COL); S Bedoya (COL)	3
A Montoya (CRC); M Araya (CRC)	0
N Chan (CAN); K Ly (CAN)	3
P Rivarola (PAR); A Bertolo (PAR)	1
A Martínez (CUB); A Capote (CUB)	3

Round of 16
S Moreno (PUR); E León (PUR)	3
S Aviles (CRC); L Zavaleta (CRC)	1
S Aspathi (USA); V Xie (USA)	3
J Robayo (ECU); A Arellano (ECU)	2
D Ferrer (VEN); C Ríos (VEN)	3
D Sosa (DOM); R Cabrera (DOM)	1
L Jutras (CAN); J Xu (CAN)	0
L Iizuka (BRA); B Fiore (BRA)	3
F Arado (BRA); K Shinay (BRA)	3
X Figueroa (MEX); J Buenrostro (MEX)	0
R Vila (DOM); A Estrella (DOM)	3
A Isaza (COL); S Bedoya (COL)	2
E Ríos (PUR); K Melendez (PUR)	3
N Chan (CAN); K Ly (CAN)	2
A Martínez (CUB); A Capote (CUB)	1
T Piyadasa (USA); N Naresh (USA)	3

Quarterfinals
S Moreno (PUR); E León (PUR)	3
S Aspathi (USA); V Xie (USA)	0
D Ferrer (VEN); C Ríos (VEN)	3
L Iizuka (BRA); B Fiore (BRA)	0
F Arado (BRA); K Shinay (BRA)	3
R Vila (DOM); A Estrella (DOM)	1
E Ríos (PUR); K Melendez (PUR)	3
T Piyadasa (USA); N Naresh (USA)	1

Semifinals
S Moreno (PUR); E León (PUR)	2
D Ferrer (VEN); C Ríos (VEN)	3
F Arado (BRA); K Shinay (BRA)	0
E Ríos (PUR); K Melendez (PUR)	3

Final
D Ferrer (VEN); C Ríos (VEN)	3
E Ríos (PUR); K Melendez (PUR)	2
