= Triathlon at the 2025 Junior Pan American Games =

Triathlon at the 2025 Junior American Games
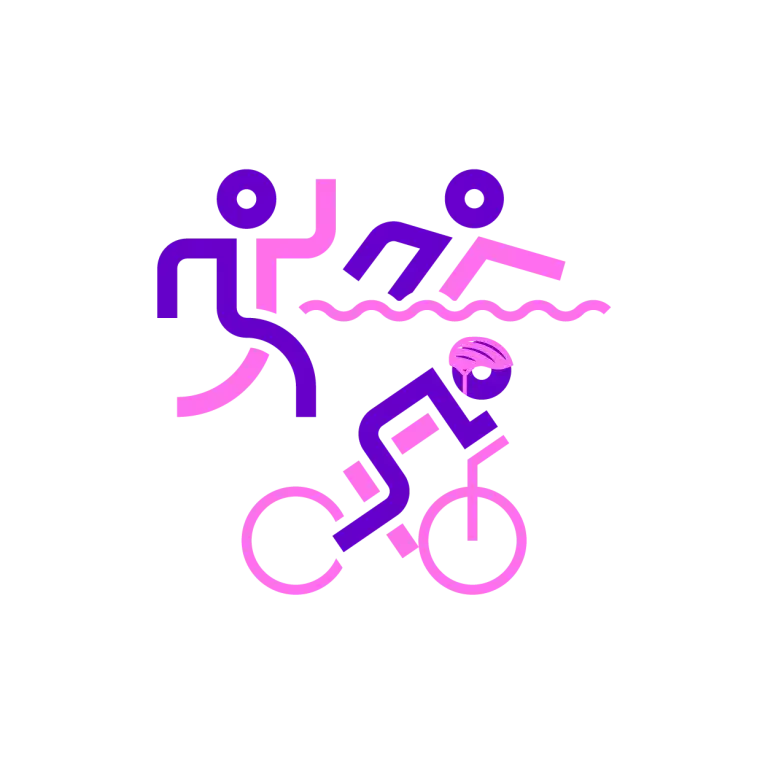
- Venue: San José Beach
- Start date: August 20, 2025
- End date: August 21, 2025
- No. of events: 3
- Competitors: 60

The triathlon events at the 2025 Junior Pan American Games were held at the San José Beach, located in Encarnación. The events were contested between August 20 and 21, 2025.

Three events were contested, one for men, one for women, and one mixed. The winner of each event qualified for the 2027 Pan American Games in Lima, Peru.

== Qualification ==
A total of 64 athletes qualified for the events (34 men and 34 women). Qualification was based on an internal selection process for North America, a Central American and the Caribbean qualification event, held in Havana, Cuba, and a South American qualification event, held in Encarnación, Paraguay.

== Medal summary ==
=== Medal table ===
* Host nation (Paraguay)

Rank	Nation	Gold	Silver	Bronze	Total
1	United States	3	1	0	4
2	Canada	0	2	0	2
3	Brazil	0	0	1	1
3	Chile	0	0	1	1
3	Mexico	0	0	1	1
Totals (5 entries)		3	3	3	9

=== Medalists ===
Event	Gold	Silver	Bronze
Men's	Braxton Legg; United States	Blake Bullard; United States	Andree Buc; Chile
Women's	Naomi Ruff; United States	Sidney Clement; Canada	Júlia Visgueiro; Brazil
Mixed relay	United States; Naomi Ruff; Blake Bullard; Jimena De La Pena; Braxton Legg	Canada; Sidney Clement; Daniel Epp; Molly Lakustiak; Blake Harris	Mexico; Regina Michel; Alfredo Rodríguez; María López; Osvaldo Zuñiga

== Results ==
=== Men's ===
Final – August 20

Rank	Triathlete	Nation	Time	Diff
1st place, gold medalist(s)	Braxton Legg	United States	54:16	__
2nd place, silver medalist(s)	Blake Bullard	United States	54:23	+0:07
3rd place, bronze medalist(s)	Andree Buc	Chile	54:30	+0:14
4	Blake Harris	Canada	54:51	+0:35
5	Thomas Chica	Ecuador	55:01	+0:45
6	Vinícius Sant’anna	Brazil	55:05	+0:49
7	Osvaldo Zuñiga	Mexico	55:10	+0:54
8	Daniel Epp	Canada	55:18	+1:02
9	David Vega	Ecuador	55:20	+1:04
10	Alfredo Rodríguez	Mexico	55:47	+1:31
11	Marcos Fernández	Cuba	55:58	+1:42
12	Thomás Castañeda	Argentina	56:28	+2:12
13	Dixon Hernández	Venezuela	56:48	+2:32
14	Cauã Diniz	Brazil	57:01	+2:45
15	Nicolás Gómez	Colombia	57:12	+2:56
16	Daniel Ubilla	Chile	57:45	+3:29
17	Jacobo Sánchez	Colombia	58:07	+3:51
18	Alain Fernández	Cuba	58:11	+3:35
19	Bautista Arbizu	Argentina	58:20	+4:04
20	Oliver Bautista	Panama	58:26	+4:10
21	Cristopher Cárdenas	Venezuela	58:29	+4:13
22	Pieter Hoornstra	Costa Rica	58:26	+4:40
23	Fynn Armstrong	Barbados	59:26	+5:10
24	Daniel Nietzen	Costa Rica	1:00:17	+6:01
25	Victor Feliz	Dominican Republic	1:02:00	+7:44
26	Iker Batista	Panama	1:02:27	+8:11
27	Matthew Lashley	Barbados	1:03:13	+8:57
28	Carlos Quintanilla	Guatemala	1:03:50	+9:34
29	Oscar Gramajo	Guatemala	1:05:46	+11:30
30	David Pardo	Paraguay	1:07:00	+12:44
	Oliver Samaniego	Paraguay	LAP	
	Michael Dizon-Bumann	Virgin Islands	DNF	

=== Women's ===
Final – August 20

Rank	Triathlete	Nation	Time	Diff
1st place, gold medalist(s)	Naomi Ruff	United States	59:49	__
2nd place, silver medalist(s)	Sidney Clement	Canada	1:00:06	+0:17
3rd place, bronze medalist(s)	Júlia Visgueiro	Brazil	1:00:08	+0:19
4	María López	Mexico	1:00:45	+0:56
5	Rafaela Capó	Chile	1:01:23	+1:34
6	Regina Michel	Mexico	1:01:34	+1:45
7	María Bonilla	Ecuador	1:02:12	+2:23
8	Molly Lakustiak	Canada	1:02:16	+2:27
9	Yaniuska Jiménez	Venezuela	1:02:24	+2:35
10	Jimena De La Pena	United States	1:02:49	+3:00
11	Bivian Díaz	Guatemala	1:03:00	+3:11
12	Zoe Adam	Puerto Rico	1:03:16	+3:27
13	Maria Clara Cunha	Brazil	1:05:00	+5:11
14	Claudia Gurri	Cuba	1:05:36	+5:47
15	Sol Ottenhsimer	Chile	1:05:47	+5:58
16	Emilia Vargas	Argentina	1:05:55	+6:06
17	Camila Alcala	Honduras	1:06:42	+6:53
18	Valeria Arce	Costa Rica	1:07:10	+7:21
19	Isis Gaskin	Barbados	1:07:36	+7:47
20	Luna Roman	Argentina	1:07:49	+8:00
21	Salamah Mahroos	Cuba	1:08:27	+8:38
22	Melanie Agreda	Ecuador	1:08:53	+9:04
23	Ariana Borbon	Costa Rica	1:09:57	+10:08
24	María Ansin	Panama	1:11:08	+11:19
25	Ana Portillo	Paraguay	1:11:38	+11:49
26	Kaya Rankine	Trinidad and Tobago	1:12:58	+13:09
27	Damelys Castillo	Venezuela	1:15:33	+15:44
	Mayda Hernández	Guatemala	LAP	
	Rocío Leaño	Bolivia	LAP	
	Celeste Aguilar	Paraguay	LAP	
	Liska Arteaga	Panama	LAP	
	Rebecca Jansen	Aruba	DNF	

=== Mixed relay ===
Final – August 22

Rank	Nation	Triathletes	Time	Diff
1st place, gold medalist(s)	United States	Naomi Ruff; Blake Bullard; Jimena De La Pena; Braxton Legg	1:23:20	__
2nd place, silver medalist(s)	Canada	Sidney Clement; Daniel Epp; Molly Lakustiak; Blake Harris	1:23:53	+0:33
3rd place, bronze medalist(s)	Mexico	Regina Michel; Alfredo Rodríguez; María López; Osvaldo Zuñiga	1:24:41	+1:21
4	Brazil	Júlia Visgueiro; Vinícius Sant’anna; Maria Clara Cunha; Cauã Diniz	1:27:42	+4:22
5	Chile	Rafaela Capó; Andree Buc; Sol Ottenhsimer; Daniel Ubilla	1:28:12	+4:52
6	Ecuador	Melanie Agreda; David Vega; María Bonilla; Thomas Chica	1:30:21	+7:01
7	Venezuela	Yaniuska Jimenez; Dixon Hernandez; Damelys Castillo; Cristopher Cárdenas	1:31:12	+7:52
8	Cuba	Claudia Gurri; Marcos Fernández; Salamah Mahroos; Alain Fernandez	1:31:45	+8:25
9	Costa Rica	Valeria Arca; Daniel Nietzen; Ariana Borbon; Pieter Hoornstra	1:31:53	+8:33
10	Guatemala	Bivian Díaz; Oscar Gramajo; Mayda Hernández; Carlos Quintanilla	1:35:35	+12:15
11	Argentina	Emilia Vargas; Thomás Castañeda; Luna Román; Bautista Arbizu	1:37:24	+14:04
12	Panama	Liska Arteaga; Oliver Bautista; María Ansin; Iker Batista	1:38:07	+14:47
13	Paraguay	Ana Portillo; David Pardo; Celeste Aguilar; Oliver Samaniego	1:45:39	+22:19
