= Saint Kitts and Nevis at the 2025 Junior Pan American Games =

- IOC code: SKN
- NOC: Saint Kitts and Nevis Olympic Committee

in Asunción, Paraguay
- Competitors: 5
- Medals: Gold 0 Silver 0 Bronze 0 Total 0

Junior Pan American Games appearances (overview)
- 2021; 2025

Saint Kitts and Nevis competed at the 2025 Junior Pan American Games in Asunción from August 9 to 23, 2025.

The team consists of 5 athletes, however, the country failed to win a medal.

== Competitors ==
The following is the list of number of competitors (per gender) participating at the games per sport/discipline.

Sport	Men	Women	Total
Athletics	1	0	1
Swimming	1	0	1
Tennis	0	1	1
Beach volleyball	2	0	2
Total	4	1	5

== See also ==
- Saint Kitts and Nevis at the Junior Pan American Games
