= Karate at the 2025 Junior Pan American Games =

Karate at the 2025 Junior American Games
- Venue: Olympic Training Centre
- Start date: August 21, 2025
- End date: August 23, 2025
- No. of events: 10
- Competitors: 80

The karate events at the 2025 Junior Pan American Games were held at the Olympic Training Centre, located in the Olympic Park in Luque, in the Greater Asuncion area. The events were contested between August 21 and 23, 2025.

Ten events were contested, five for men and five for women. The winner of each event qualified for the 2027 Pan American Games in Lima, Peru.

== Qualification ==
A total of 80 athletes qualified for the events (40 men and 40 women). Eighth athletes qualified for each weight category. Qualification was based on the results from the 2024 Pan American Championship Qualifier, held at São Bernardo do Campo, Brazil.

== Medal summary ==
=== Medal table ===
* Host nation (Paraguay)

Rank	Nation	Gold	Silver	Bronze	Total
1	Venezuela	2	3	0	5
2	Brazil	1	3	3	7
3	Ecuador	1	1	0	2
3	Nicaragua	1	1	0	2
5	Argentina	1	0	3	4
5	United States	1	0	3	4
7	Mexico	1	0	2	3
8	Canada	1	0	0	1
8	Puerto Rico	1	0	0	1
10	Peru	0	1	1	2
10	Uruguay	0	1	1	2
12	Bolivia	0	0	3	3
12	Colombia	0	0	3	3
14	Chile	0	0	1	1
Totals (14 entries)		10	10	20	40

=== Medalists ===
==== Men ====
Event	Gold	Silver	Bronze
–60 kg	Juan Gallardo; Argentina	Sebastián Chirinos; Venezuela	Hermes Moreno; Peru
–60 kg	Juan Gallardo; Argentina	Sebastián Chirinos; Venezuela	Jean Dorta; United States
–67 kg	Evangelos Akde; United States	Anderson Cano; Nicaragua	Bruno Ayphassorho; Uruguay
–67 kg	Evangelos Akde; United States	Anderson Cano; Nicaragua	Vladimir Milazzo; Argentina
–75 kg	Jesús Castro; Venezuela	Lucas Menezes; Brazil	Hayato Yoshii; Mexico
–75 kg	Jesús Castro; Venezuela	Lucas Menezes; Brazil	Luka Salesky; Argentina
–84 kg	Andrey Nazário; Brazil	Tomas Dotta; Uruguay	Sebastian Becerra; Bolivia
–84 kg	Andrey Nazário; Brazil	Tomas Dotta; Uruguay	Kristian Taneski; United States
+84 kg	Joaquin Sanchez; Venezuela	Cesar Vallejo; Ecuador	Nicolás Gamboa; Colombia
+84 kg	Joaquin Sanchez; Venezuela	Cesar Vallejo; Ecuador	Ademilton Nogueira; Brazil

==== Women ====
Event	Gold	Silver	Bronze
–50 kg	Joysi Tinoco; Nicaragua	Ana Vasquez; Venezuela	Melani Unzueta; Bolivia
–50 kg	Joysi Tinoco; Nicaragua	Ana Vasquez; Venezuela	Angélica Ospina; Colombia
–55 kg	Maria Ouyahia; Canada	Sofia Del Pilar Gómez; Peru	Sol Sandoval; Bolivia
–55 kg	Maria Ouyahia; Canada	Sofia Del Pilar Gómez; Peru	Leticia Kato; Brazil
–61 kg	Ana Herrera; Mexico	Maria Isabel Alvites; Brazil	Ana Gómez; Colombia
–61 kg	Ana Herrera; Mexico	Maria Isabel Alvites; Brazil	Micaela Pacheco; Argentina
–68 kg	Elysia Hernandez; Puerto Rico	Marena Juncosa; Venezuela	Ana Muñoz; Mexico
–68 kg	Elysia Hernandez; Puerto Rico	Marena Juncosa; Venezuela	Roberta Lopes; Brazil
+68 kg	Jahaira Manrique; Ecuador	Barbara Amaral; Brazil	Destiny Jennings; United States
+68 kg	Jahaira Manrique; Ecuador	Barbara Amaral; Brazil	Franchesca Muñoz; Chile

== Results ==
=== Men's kumite ===
==== 60 kg ====
Date: August 23

Pool A

Rk	Athlete	Pld	W	T	L	Pts.	Score
1	Hermes Moreno (PER)	3	2	0	1	6	17–8
2	Jean Dorta (USA)	3	2	0	1	6	12–5
3	Anthony Tamayo (ECU)	3	2	0	1	6	11–17
4	Edwin Castillo (PAN)	3	0	0	3	0	9–19

	Score	
Hermes Moreno (PER)	4–5	Anthony Tamayo (ECU)
Edwin Castillo (PAN)	2–3	Jean Dorta (USA)
Hermes Moreno (PER)	10–2	Edwin Castillo (PAN)
Anthony Tamayo (ECU)	0–8	Jean Dorta (USA)
Hermes Moreno (PER)	3–1	Jean Dorta (USA)
Edwin Castillo (PAN)	5–6	Anthony Tamayo (ECU)

Pool B

Rk	Athlete	Pld	W	T	L	Pts.	Score
1	Juan Gallardo (ARG)	3	3	0	0	9	8–3
2	Sebastián Chirinos (VEN)	3	2	0	1	6	12–5
3	Fabbio Ponce (MEX)	3	1	0	2	3	6–9
4	Ivan Florentin (PAR)	3	0	0	3	0	3–12

	Score	
Juan Gallardo (ARG)	2–0	Sebastián Chirinos (VEN)
Fabbio Ponce (MEX)	3–0	Ivan Florentin (PAR)
Juan Gallardo (ARG)	2–1	Fabbio Ponce (MEX)
Sebastián Chirinos (VEN)	5–1	Ivan Florentin (PAR)
Juan Gallardo (ARG)	4–2	Ivan Florentin (PAR)
Fabbio Ponce (MEX)	2–7	Sebastián Chirinos (VEN)

Finals

Semifinals
Hermes Moreno (PER)	0
Sebastián Chirinos (VEN)	4
Jean Dorta (USA)	1
Juan Gallardo (ARG)	2

Gold medal match
Sebastián Chirinos (VEN)	0
Juan Gallardo (ARG)	1

==== 67 kg ====
Date: August 22

Pool A

Rk	Athlete	Pld	W	T	L	Pts.	Score
1	Evangelos Akde (USA)	3	3	0	0	9	23–9
2	Vladimir Milazzo (ARG)	3	2	0	1	6	17–4
3	Diego Chacón (GUA)	3	1	0	2	3	17–21
4	Enzo Lopez (PAR)	3	0	0	3	0	0–23

	Score	
Evangelos Akde (USA)	12–8	Diego Chacón (GUA)
Vladimir Milazzo (ARG)	7–0	Enzo Lopez (PAR)
Evangelos Akde (USA)	2–1	Vladimir Milazzo (ARG)
Diego Chacón (GUA)	7–0	Enzo Lopez (PAR)
Evangelos Akde (USA)	9–0	Enzo Lopez (PAR)
Vladimir Milazzo (ARG)	9–2	Diego Chacón (GUA)

Pool B

Rk	Athlete	Pld	W	T	L	Pts.	Score
1	Anderson Cano (NCA)	3	2	0	1	6	21–9
2	Bruno Ayphassorho (URU)	3	2	0	1	6	11–11
3	Fernando Villegas (PER)	3	1	0	2	3	10–21
4	Maximiliano Jara (CHI)	3	1	0	2	3	21–22

	Score	
Fernando Villegas (PER)	1–9	Anderson Cano (NCA)
Bruno Ayphassorho (URU)	10–6	Maximiliano Jara (CHI)
Fernando Villegas (PER)	1–5	Bruno Ayphassorho (URU)
Anderson Cano (NCA)	8–8	Maximiliano Jara (CHI)
Fernando Villegas (PER)	12–7	Maximiliano Jara (CHI)
Bruno Ayphassorho (URU)	0–4	Anderson Cano (NCA)

Finals

Semifinals
Evangelos Akde (USA)	0
Bruno Ayphassorho (URU)	0
Vladimir Milazzo (ARG)	3
Anderson Cano (NCA)	4

Gold medal match
Evangelos Akde (USA)	10
Anderson Cano (NCA)	3

==== 75 kg ====
Date: August 22

Pool A

Rk	Athlete	Pld	W	T	L	Pts.	Score
1	Jesús Castro (VEN)	3	3	0	0	9	9–2
2	Lucas Menezes (BRA)	3	2	0	1	6	8–1
3	Lê Vinh Bricteux (CAN)	3	1	0	2	3	6–7
4	José Gómez (COL)	3	0	0	3	0	3–16

	Score	
José Gómez (COL)	0–5	Lucas Menezes (BRA)
Jesús Castro (VEN)	2–1	Lê Vinh Bricteux (CAN)
José Gómez (COL)	1–7	Jesús Castro (VEN)
Lucas Menezes (BRA)	3–1	Lê Vinh Bricteux (CAN)
José Gómez (COL)	2–4	Lê Vinh Bricteux (CAN)
Jesús Castro (VEN)	0–0	Lucas Menezes (BRA)

Pool B

Rk	Athlete	Pld	W	T	L	Pts.	Score
1	Luka Salesky (ARG)	3	2	0	1	6	8–5
2	Hayato Yoshii (MEX)	3	2	0	1	6	11–4
3	Dieter Rinck (PAR)	3	1	0	2	3	5–12
4	Keanu Feliz (DOM)	3	1	0	2	3	4–7

	Score	
Hayato Yoshii (MEX)	1–0	Keanu Feliz (DOM)
Dieter Rinck (PAR)	1–2	Luka Salesky (ARG)
Hayato Yoshii (MEX)	8–0	Dieter Rinck (PAR)
Keanu Feliz (DOM)	2–2	Luka Salesky (ARG)
Hayato Yoshii (MEX)	2–4	Luka Salesky (ARG)
Dieter Rinck (PAR)	4–2	Keanu Feliz (DOM)

Finals

Semifinals
Jesús Castro (VEN)	9
Hayato Yoshii (MEX)	3
Lucas Menezes (BRA)	2
Luka Salesky (ARG)	1

Gold medal match
Jesús Castro (VEN)	3
Lucas Menezes (BRA)	2

==== 84 kg ====
Date: August 21

Pool A

Rk	Athlete	Pld	W	T	L	Pts.	Score
1	Andrey Nazário (BRA)	2	2	0	0	6	12–3
2	Kristian Taneski (USA)	2	1	0	1	3	7–3
3	Jesús Garcia (MEX)	2	0	0	2	0	1–14

	Score	
Jesús Garcia (MEX)	1–9	Andrey Nazário (BRA)
Jesús Garcia (MEX)	0–5	Kristian Taneski (USA)
Kristian Taneski (USA)	2–3	Andrey Nazário (BRA)

Pool B

Rk	Athlete	Pld	W	T	L	Pts.	Score
1	Tomas Dotta (URU)	2	2	0	0	6	9–3
2	Sebastian Becerra (BOL)	2	1	0	1	3	9–9
3	Louis-Félix Deschamps (CAN)	2	0	0	2	0	4–10

	Score	
Tomas Dotta (URU)	6–2	Sebastian Becerra (BOL)
Tomas Dotta (URU)	3–1	Louis-Félix Deschamps (CAN)
Louis-Félix Deschamps (CAN)	3–7	Sebastian Becerra (BOL)

Finals

Semifinals
Andrey Nazário (BRA)	6
Sebastian Becerra (BOL)	2
Kristian Taneski (USA)	2
Tomas Dotta (URU)	3

Gold medal match
Andrey Nazário (BRA)	8
Tomas Dotta (URU)	0

==== +84 kg ====
Date: August 21

Pool A

Rk	Athlete	Pld	W	T	L	Pts.	Score
1	Joaquin Sanchez (VEN)	3	2	0	1	6	19–6
2	Ademilton Nogueira (BRA)	3	2	0	1	6	15–19
3	Alberto Velasco (MEX)	3	2	0	1	6	13–10
4	Jared White (USA)	3	0	0	3	0	5–15

	Score	
Joaquin Sanchez (VEN)	3–4	Alberto Velasco (MEX)
Ademilton Nogueira (BRA)	10–10	Jared White (USA)
Joaquin Sanchez (VEN)	6–2	Ademilton Nogueira (BRA)
Alberto Velasco (MEX)	6–4	Jared White (USA)
Joaquin Sanchez (VEN)	10–0	Jared White (USA)
Ademilton Nogueira (BRA)	3–3	Alberto Velasco (MEX)

Pool B

Rk	Athlete	Pld	W	T	L	Pts.	Score
1	Cesar Vallejo (ECU)	3	3	0	0	9	13–3
2	Nicolás Gamboa (COL)	3	2	0	1	6	11–3
3	Gael Muñoz (BOL)	3	1	0	2	3	7–10
4	Sebastián Rojas (CHI)	3	0	0	3	0	2–17

	Score	
Cesar Vallejo (ECU)	3–3	Gael Muñoz (BOL)
Sebastián Rojas (CHI)	1–5	Nicolás Gamboa (COL)
Cesar Vallejo (ECU)	8–0	Sebastián Rojas (CHI)
Gael Muñoz (BOL)	0–6	Nicolás Gamboa (COL)
Cesar Vallejo (ECU)	2–0	Nicolás Gamboa (COL)
Sebastián Rojas (CHI)	1–4	Gael Muñoz (BOL)

Finals

Semifinals
Joaquin Sanchez (VEN)	2
Nicolás Gamboa (COL)	1
Ademilton Nogueira (BRA)	3
Cesar Vallejo (ECU)	3

Gold medal match
Joaquin Sanchez (VEN)	3
Cesar Vallejo (ECU)	2

=== Women's kumite ===
==== 50 kg ====
Date: August 23

Pool A

Rk	Athlete	Pld	W	T	L	Pts.	Score
1	Melani Unzueta (BOL)	2	2	0	0	6	5–2
2	Ana Vasquez (VEN)	2	1	0	1	3	7–4
3	Sofia Madero (ARG)	2	0	0	2	0	3–9

	Score	
Sofia Madero (ARG)	1–3	Melani Unzueta (BOL)
Sofia Madero (ARG)	2–6	Ana Vasquez (VEN)
Ana Vasquez (VEN)	1–2	Melani Unzueta (BOL)

Pool B

Rk	Athlete	Pld	W	T	L	Pts.	Score
1	Angélica Ospina (COL)	3	2	0	1	6	18–14
2	Joysi Tinoco (NCA)	3	2	0	1	6	8–4
3	Azumi Sánchez (PER)	3	1	0	2	3	9–12
4	Emilia Salinas (MEX)	3	1	0	2	3	12–17

	Score	
Joysi Tinoco (NCA)	2–0	Azumi Sánchez (PER)
Emilia Salinas (MEX)	9–7	Angélica Ospina (COL)
Joysi Tinoco (NCA)	5–1	Emilia Salinas (MEX)
Azumi Sánchez (PER)	4–8	Angélica Ospina (COL)
Joysi Tinoco (NCA)	1–3	Angélica Ospina (COL)
Emilia Salinas (MEX)	2–5	Azumi Sánchez (PER)

Finals

Semifinals
Melani Unzueta (BOL)	3
Joysi Tinoco (NCA)	6
Ana Vasquez (VEN)	3
Angélica Ospina (COL)	2

Gold medal match
Joysi Tinoco (NCA)	2
Ana Vasquez (VEN)	1

==== 55 kg ====
Date: August 22

Pool A

Rk	Athlete	Pld	W	T	L	Pts.	Score
1	Leticia Kato (BRA)	3	3	0	0	9	16–7
2	Sol Sandoval (BOL)	3	1	0	2	3	12–11
3	Isabel Marenco (NCA)	3	1	0	2	3	7–11
4	Jenifer Bolado (ARG)	3	1	0	2	3	7–13

	Score	
Sol Sandoval (BOL)	6–1	Jenifer Bolado (ARG)
Isabel Marenco (NCA)	1–5	Leticia Kato (BRA)
Sol Sandoval (BOL)	2–5	Isabel Marenco (NCA)
Jenifer Bolado (ARG)	2–6	Leticia Kato (BRA)
Sol Sandoval (BOL)	4–5	Leticia Kato (BRA)
Isabel Marenco (NCA)	1–4	Jenifer Bolado (ARG)

Pool B

Rk	Athlete	Pld	W	T	L	Pts.	Score
1	Maria Ouyahia (CAN)	3	3	0	0	9	22–3
2	Sofia Del Pilar Gómez (PER)	3	2	0	1	6	20–5
3	Hazel Ramos (ESA)	3	1	0	2	3	12–19
4	Amalia Leyton (PAR)	3	0	0	3	0	0–27

	Score	
Maria Ouyahia (CAN)	11–1	Hazel Ramos (ESA)
Amalia Leyton (PAR)	0–10	Sofia Del Pilar Gómez (PER)
Maria Ouyahia (CAN)	9–0	Amalia Leyton (PAR)
Hazel Ramos (ESA)	3–8	Sofia Del Pilar Gómez (PER)
Maria Ouyahia (CAN)	2–2	Sofia Del Pilar Gómez (PER)
Amalia Leyton (PAR)	0–8	Hazel Ramos (ESA)

Finals

Semifinals
Leticia Kato (BRA)	1
Sofia Del Pilar Gómez (PER)	6
Sol Sandoval (BOL)	0
Maria Ouyahia (CAN)	0

Gold medal match
Sofia Del Pilar Gómez (PER)	5
Maria Ouyahia (CAN)	5

==== 61 kg ====
Date: August 22

Pool A

Rk	Athlete	Pld	W	T	L	Pts.	Score
1	Ana Herrera (MEX)	3	2	0	1	6	15–11
2	Micaela Pacheco (ARG)	3	2	0	1	6	13–6
3	Karinne Tirado (VEN)	3	2	0	1	6	9–12
4	Yaleika Mojica (PUR)	3	0	0	3	0	2–10

	Score	
Ana Herrera (MEX)	2–7	Micaela Pacheco (ARG)
Karinne Tirado (VEN)	2–1	Yaleika Mojica (PUR)
Ana Herrera (MEX)	7–3	Karinne Tirado (VEN)
Micaela Pacheco (ARG)	2–0	Yaleika Mojica (PUR)
Ana Herrera (MEX)	6–1	Yaleika Mojica (PUR)
Karinne Tirado (VEN)	4–4	Micaela Pacheco (ARG)

Pool B

Rk	Athlete	Pld	W	T	L	Pts.	Score
1	Maria Isabel Alvites (BRA)	3	2	1	0	6	8–3
2	Ana Gómez (COL)	3	1	0	2	3	12–12
3	Alyssa Floresca (USA)	3	1	0	2	3	12–14
4	Mélody Monfiston (CAN)	3	1	1	1	3	6–9

	Score	
Mélody Monfiston (CAN)	4–3	Alyssa Floresca (USA)
Maria Isabel Alvites (BRA)	3–1	Ana Gómez (COL)
Mélody Monfiston (CAN)	0–0	Maria Isabel Alvites (BRA)
Alyssa Floresca (USA)	7–5	Ana Gómez (COL)
Mélody Monfiston (CAN)	2–6	Ana Gómez (COL)
Maria Isabel Alvites (BRA)	5–2	Alyssa Floresca (USA)

Finals

Semifinals
Ana Herrera (MEX)	9
Ana Gómez (COL)	7
Micaela Pacheco (ARG)	0
Maria Isabel Alvites (BRA)	5

Gold medal match
Ana Herrera (MEX)	6
Maria Isabel Alvites (BRA)	1

==== 68 kg ====
Date: August 21

Pool A

Rk	Athlete	Pld	W	T	L	Pts.	Score
1	Elysia Hernandez (PUR)	3	3	0	0	9	7–2
2	Roberta Lopes (BRA)	3	2	0	1	6	6–3
3	Ella Crowle (CAN)	3	1	0	2	3	7–5
4	Muriel Ubeda (NCA)	3	0	0	3	0	2–12

	Score	
Elysia Hernandez (PUR)	3–1	Muriel Ubeda (NCA)
Roberta Lopes (BRA)	2–1	Ella Crowle (CAN)
Elysia Hernandez (PUR)	1–0	Roberta Lopes (BRA)
Muriel Ubeda (NCA)	0–5	Ella Crowle (CAN)
Elysia Hernandez (PUR)	3–1	Ella Crowle (CAN)
Roberta Lopes (BRA)	4–1	Muriel Ubeda (NCA)

Pool B

Rk	Athlete	Pld	W	T	L	Pts.	Score
1	Marena Juncosa (VEN)	3	3	0	0	9	26–12
2	Ana Muñoz (MEX)	3	2	0	1	6	11–10
3	Amy Lopez (ECU)	3	1	0	2	3	16–11
4	Alen Hernández (CHI)	3	0	0	3	0	2–22

	Score	
Amy Lopez (ECU)	8–0	Alen Hernández (CHI)
Marena Juncosa (VEN)	8–4	Ana Muñoz (MEX)
Amy Lopez (ECU)	7–7	Marena Juncosa (VEN)
Alen Hernández (CHI)	1–3	Ana Muñoz (MEX)
Amy Lopez (ECU)	1–4	Ana Muñoz (MEX)
Marena Juncosa (VEN)	11–1	Alen Hernández (CHI)

Finals

Semifinals
Elysia Hernandez (PUR)	9
Ana Muñoz (MEX)	1
Roberta Lopes (BRA)	1
Marena Juncosa (VEN)	5

Gold medal match
Elysia Hernandez (PUR)	6
Marena Juncosa (VEN)	2

==== +68 kg ====
Date: August 21

Pool A

Rk	Athlete	Pld	W	T	L	Pts.	Score
1	Jahaira Manrique (ECU)	2	2	0	0	6	12–2
2	Franchesca Muñoz (CHI)	2	1	0	1	3	11–5
3	Victoria Tam (CAN)	2	0	0	2	0	1–17

	Score	
Franchesca Muñoz (CHI)	2–4	Jahaira Manrique (ECU)
Franchesca Muñoz (CHI)	9–1	Victoria Tam (CAN)
Victoria Tam (CAN)	0–8	Jahaira Manrique (ECU)

Pool B

Rk	Athlete	Pld	W	T	L	Pts.	Score
1	Barbara Amaral (BRA)	3	2	1	0	6	14–2
2	Destiny Jennings (USA)	3	1	1	1	3	12–8
3	Sofia Guarin (COL)	3	1	0	2	3	12–17
4	Yamili Morales (PAR)	3	1	0	2	3	9–20

	Score	
Sofia Guarin (COL)	4–8	Destiny Jennings (USA)
Yamili Morales (PAR)	0–10	Barbara Amaral (BRA)
Sofia Guarin (COL)	6–5	Yamili Morales (PAR)
Destiny Jennings (USA)	0–0	Barbara Amaral (BRA)
Sofia Guarin (COL)	2–4	Barbara Amaral (BRA)
Yamili Morales (PAR)	4–4	Destiny Jennings (USA)

Finals

Semifinals
Jahaira Manrique (ECU)	8
Destiny Jennings (USA)	4
Franchesca Muñoz (CHI)	2
Barbara Amaral (BRA)	3

Gold medal match
Jahaira Manrique (ECU)	1
Barbara Amaral (BRA)	0
