= United States at the 2025 Junior Pan American Games =

- IOC code: USA
- NOC: United States Olympic & Paralympic Committee
- Website: www.teamusa.com

in Asunción, Paraguay 9 August 2025 – 23 August 2025
- Competitors: 220 in 24 sports
- Flag bearers: Alyssa Klebasko; Braden Peiser
- Medals Ranked 2nd: Gold 54 Silver 42 Bronze 46 Total 142

Junior Pan American Games appearances (overview)
- 2021; 2025

The United States competed at the 2025 Junior Pan American Games in Asunción, Paraguay from August 9 to 23, 2025.

The flag bearers at the opening ceremony were field hockey player Alyssa Klebasko and sport shooter Braden Peiser.

== Medalists ==
The following American competitors won medals at the games.

Medal	Name	Sport	Event	Date
Gold	Suman Sanghera	Shooting	Women's 10m Air Pistol	August 10
Gold	Braden Peiser	Shooting	Men's 10m Air Rifle	August 11
Gold	Isabella Baldwin	Shooting	Women's 10m Air Rifle	August 11
Gold	Ava Downs	Shooting	Women's Trap	August 11
Gold	Natalie de la Rosa	Gymnastics	Individual All-Around	August 12
Gold	Ryan Maccagnan	Gymnastics	Men's Individual Trampoline	August 12
Gold	Taj Gleitsman; Ryan Maccagnan	Gymnastics	Men's Synchronized Trampoline	August 12
Gold	Kennedi Roberts	Gymnastics	Women's Individual Trampoline	August 12
Gold	Suman Sanghera; Marcus Klemp	Shooting	Mixed Team Air Pistol	August 12
Gold	Isabella Baldwin; Braden Peiser	Shooting	Mixed Team Air Rifle	August 12
Gold	Tony Meola; Carey Garrison	Shooting	Mixed Team Trap	August 12
Gold	Natalie de la Rosa	Gymnastics	Individual Hoop	August 13
Gold	Anna Filipp	Gymnastics	Individual Clubs	August 13
Gold	Anna Filipp	Gymnastics	Individual Ribbon	August 13
Gold	Ellireese Niday	Diving	Women's 10m Platform	August 17
Gold	Hamilton Barclay	Sailing	One-person Dinghy (ILCA 7)	August 17
Gold	Makani Andrews	Sailing	Men's Windsurfing (iQFOiL)	August 17
Gold	Sunghyun Eric Gun	Taekwondo	Men's Individual Traditional Poomsae	August 17
Gold	Kaitlyn Reclusado	Taekwondo	Women's Individual Traditional Poomsae	August 17
Gold	Kaitlyn Reclusado; Sunghyun Eric Gun	Taekwondo	Mixed Poomsae Freestyle Pairs	August 17
Gold	Sophia Verzyl	Diving	Women's 1m Springboard	August 18
Gold	Jacob Melton	Speed skating	Men's Singles 1000m Sprint	August 18
Gold	Nandan Naresh	Table tennis	Men's Singles	August 18
Gold	Dominick Camarena; Jason Hao; Nixon Miles; William McCrea	Gymnastics	Men's Team	August 19
Gold	Sophia Verzyl	Diving	Women's 3m Springboard	August 19
Gold	Charleigh Bullock	Gymnastics	Women's All-Around	August 20
Gold	Addalye VanGrinsven; Charleigh Bullock; Kylie Smith; Lavi Crain	Gymnastics	Women's Team	August 20
Gold	Braxton Legg	Triathlon	Men's Individual	August 20
Gold	Naomi Ruff	Triathlon	Women's Individual	August 20
Gold	Jake Abelson	Water skiing	Men's Tricks	August 20
Gold	Alexia Abelson	Water skiing	Women's Tricks	August 20
Gold	Aden Attao	Wrestling	Men's Greco-Roman 130kg	August 20
Gold	Maxwell Black	Wrestling	Men's Greco-Roman 60kg	August 20
Gold	Aydin Rix	Wrestling	Men's Greco-Roman 77kg	August 20
Gold	Payton Jacobson	Wrestling	Men's Greco-Roman 87kg	August 20
Gold	Charleigh Bullock	Gymnastics	Women's Uneven Bars	August 21
Gold	Addalye VanGrinsven	Gymnastics	Women's Vault	August 21
Gold	Tashiya Piyadasa; Satya Aspathi	Table tennis	Women's Team	August 21
Gold	Jake Abelson	Water skiing	Men's Overall	August 21
Gold	Alexia Abelson	Water skiing	Women's Overall	August 21
Gold	Kitt Smith	Water skiing	Women's Wakeboard	August 21
Gold	Tristan Kelly	Wrestling	Women's Freestyle 76kg	August 21
Gold	Charleigh Bullock	Gymnastics	Women's Balance Beam	August 22
Gold	Charleigh Bullock	Gymnastics	Women's Floor Exercise	August 22
Gold	Gage Basey; Thomas Hurst	Beach volleyball	Men's Team	August 22
Gold	Portia Sherman; Emma Donley	Beach volleyball	Women's Team	August 22
Gold	Portia Sherman; Emma Donley	Beach volleyball	Women's Team	August 22
Gold	Alexis Alden	Cycling	Women's BMX Racing	August 22
Gold	Evangelos Akde	Karate	Men's -67kg	August 22
Gold	Naomi Ruff; Blake Bullard; Jimena de la Peña; Braxton Legg	Triathlon	Mixed Relay	August 22
Gold	Lucas Stoddard	Wrestling	Men's Freestyle 125kg	August 22
Gold	Bowen Bassett	Wrestling	Men's Freestyle 65kg	August 22
Gold	Mitchell Mesenbrink	Wrestling	Men's Freestyle 74kg	August 22
Gold	Rocco Welsh	Wrestling	Men's Freestyle 86kg	August 22
Gold	Thomas Dineen	Wrestling	Men's Freestyle 97kg	August 22
Silver	William J. Lim	Fencing	Men's Sabre Individual	August 10
Silver	Christopher Velazco	Judo	Men's -60kg	August 10
Silver	Jacob Yang	Judo	Men's -66kg	August 10
Silver	Aidin Burns	Shooting	Men's Skeet	August 10
Silver	Gracelynn Hensley	Shooting	Women's Skeet	August 10
Silver	Elijah Spencer	Shooting	Women's 10m Air Rifle	August 11
Silver	Iris Yang	Fencing	Women's Foil Individual	August 11
Silver	Emily Jaspe	Judo	Women's -63kg	August 11
Silver	Griffin Lake	Shooting	Men's 10m Air Rifle	August 11
Silver	Lazer Crawford	Skateboarding	Men's Street	August 11
Silver	Poe Pinson	Skateboarding	Women's Street	August 11
Silver	Kaleb Horinek; Ava Downs	Shooting	Mixed Team Trap	August 12
Silver	Emma Yul Kim; Jack Krengel	Archery	Recurve Mixed Team	August 12
Silver	Kaylee Gurney; Zachary Neilson	Archery	Compound Mixed Team	August 12
Silver	Logan Mia McCoy; Kennedi Roberts	Gymnastics	Women's Synchronized Trampoline	August 12
Silver	Daniel Liubimovski	Judo	Men's -100kg	August 12
Silver	Anna Filipp	Gymnastics	Individual All-Around	August 12
Silver	Alana Hirota; Leyla Kukhmazova; Nina Keys; Sasha Kuliyev; Ziahayana Khan	Gymnastics	Group All Around	August 12
Silver	Alana Hirota; Leyla Kukhmazova; Nina Keys; Sasha Kuliyev; Ziahayana Khan	Gymnastics	5 Club Pairs	August 13
Silver	Natalie de la Rosa	Gymnastics	Individual Ball	August 13
Silver	Anna Filipp	Gymnastics	Individual Hoop	August 13
Silver	Maikol Rodriguez	Taekwondo	Men's Kyorugi -68kg	August 15
Silver	Montana Miller	Taekwondo	Women's Kyorugi -57kg	August 15
Silver	Sophia Verzyl; Anna Kwong	Diving	Women's 3m Springboard Synchronized	August 16
Silver	Hannah McLaughlin	Diving	Women's 10m Platform	August 17
Silver	U.S. women's U21 rugby sevens team: Marley Larkin; Lionala Mayorga; Tahna Wilfley; Florinalaulaau Liufau; Annabella Vogel; Fane Tausinga; Kori Fields; Alta Vasiti Vuniwai; Kiyanah Edwards; Anneliese Henrich; Jayna Schalesky; Paola Arredondo	Rugby sevens	Women's Team	August 17
Silver	Jacob Melton	Speed skating	Men's Singles 200m Time Trial	August 18
Silver	Nandan Naresh; Victor Ying Xie	Table tennis	Men's Double	August 18
Silver	U.S. women's U21 field hockey team: Mia Myklebust; Isabella Bianco; Maci Bradford; Milaw Clause; Olivia McKenna; Ella Beach; Talia Schenck; Sofia Ferri; Lauren Masters; Ava Moore; Macy Szukics; Rylie Wollerton; Madison Beach; Gia Whalen; Alaina McVeigh; Alyssa Klebasko	Field hockey	Women's Team	August 19
Silver	Jacob Melton	Speed skating	Men's Singles 500m + Distance	August 20
Silver	Jake Abelson	Water skiing	Men's Jump	August 20
Silver	Jade Angeline	Weightlifting	Women's 53Kg	August 20
Silver	Emma Grace Davis	Water skiing	Women's Overall	August 21
Silver	William McCrea	Gymnastics	Men's Vault	August 21
Silver	Brooklyn Hays	Wrestling	Women's Freestyle 68kg	August 21
Silver	Charles Farmer	Wrestling	Men's Freestyle 57kg	August 22
Silver	Addalye VanGrinsven	Gymnastics	Women's Balance Beam	August 22
Silver	Ethan Popovich	Cycling	Men's BMX Racing	August 22
Silver	Derin Merten	Cycling	Women's BMX Racing	August 22
Silver	Blake Bullard	Triathlon	Men's Individual	August 22
Silver	Ella Nicholson	Weightlifting	Women's 77Kg	August 22
Silver	Anamaria Camero; Dempsey Raftus; Eloise Krigbaum; Hyeonseo Ryou; Isabella Bae; Jennifer Ryu; Mona Schwickert; Olivia Zhu; Samantha Chu	Artistic swimming	Mixed Team	August 23
Bronze	Zachary Neilson	Archery	Men's Individual Compound	August 12
Bronze	Kaylee Gurney	Archery	Women's Individual Compound	August 12
Bronze	Jason Hao	Gymnastics	Men's All-Around	August 19
Bronze	Jason Hao	Gymnastics	Men's Pommel Horse	August 21
Bronze	Nixon Miles	Gymnastics	Men's Rings	August 21
Bronze	Addalye VanGrinsven	Gymnastics	Women's All-Around	August 20
Bronze	Addalye VanGrinsven	Gymnastics	Women's Floor Exercise	August 22
Bronze	Sean Folstein	Artistic skating	Men's Solo Dance	August 22
Bronze	Anamaria Camero; Hyeonseo Ryou	Artistic swimming	Duets	August 22
Bronze	Zicheng Xu	Badminton	Men's Singles	August 12
Bronze	Ella Lin	Badminton	Women's Singles	August 12
Bronze	Ella Lin; Zicheng Xu	Badminton	Mixed Doubles	August 12
Bronze	Audrey Chang; Tian Zhang	Badminton	Mixed Doubles	August 12
Bronze	Evan Esposito	Cycling	Men's BMX Racing	August 22
Bronze	Collier Dyer; Luke Hernandez	Diving	Men's 3m Springboard Synchronized	August 17
Bronze	Ellireese Niday; Hannah McLaughlin	Diving	Women's 10m Platform Synchronized	August 19
Bronze	Daniel Yuan Gao	Fencing	Men's Épée Individual	August 11
Bronze	Jayden Hooshi	Fencing	Men's Foil Individual	August 12
Bronze	U.S. men's U21 handball team: Rodrigo Campos; Oskar Trummer; Matthew Spranda; Grayson Wide; Benjamin Pedersen; Benjamin Edwards; Martín Brunvold; Jamie Merkel; Maximillian Olesen; Kaeden Kuhlmeyer; Kahlil Liden; Jordan Fernández; Maksim McCauley; Csaba Darvas	Handball	Men's Team	August 22
Bronze	Kanta Ueyama	Judo	Men's +100kg	August 12
Bronze	Malia Manibog	Judo	Women's -48kg	August 10
Bronze	Mackenzie Schultz	Judo	Women's -78kg	August 12
Bronze	Rhadi Ferguson	Judo	Women's +78kg	August 12
Bronze	Daniel Schulgin; Rhadi Ferguson; Kanta Ueyama; Nicole Cancela; Jacob Yang; Emily Jaspe	Judo	Mixed Team	August 13
Bronze	Jean Dorta	Karate	Men's -60kg	August 23
Bronze	Kristian Taneski	Karate	Men's -84kg	August 21
Bronze	Destiny Jennings	Karate	Women's +68kg	August 21

Medals by sport/discipline
Sport	1st place, gold medalist(s)	2nd place, silver medalist(s)	3rd place, bronze medalist(s)	Total
Gymnastics	14	8	9	31
Wrestling	10	2	4	16
Shooting	7	5	3	15
Water skiing	5	2	3	10
Diving	3	2	2	7
Taekwondo	3	2	1	6
Triathlon	3	1	0	4
Table tennis	2	1	2	5
Sailing	2	0	1	3
Beach volleyball	2	0	0	2
Cycling	1	2	1	4
Speed skating	1	2	0	3
Karate	1	0	3	4
Judo	0	4	5	9
Archery	0	2	2	4
Fencing	0	2	2	4
Weightlifting	0	2	1	3
Skateboarding	0	2	0	2
Artistic swimming	0	1	1	2
Field hockey	0	1	0	1
Rugby sevens	0	1	0	1
Badminton	0	0	4	4
Artistic skating	0	0	1	1
Handball	0	0	1	1
Total	54	42	46	142

== Competitors ==
The following is the list of number of competitors participating at the Games per sport/discipline.

Sport	Men	Women	Total
Archery	2	2	4
Artistic skating	2	1	3
Badminton	2	2	4
Cycling	2	2	4
Diving	4	4	8
Fencing	3	2	5
Gymnastics	6	13	19
Handball	14	15	29
Field hockey	16	16	32
Judo	6	7	15
Karate	4	2	6
Rugby sevens	0	12	12
Sailing	2	2	4
Shooting	8	8	16
Skateboarding	1	1	2
Speed skating	2	2	4
Artistic swimming	0	9	9
Taekwondo	3	4	7
Triathlon	2	2	4
Table tennis	2	2	4
Beach volleyball	2	2	4
Weightlifting	1	3	4
Wrestling	12	5	17
Water skiing	3	3	6
Total	99	121	220
