= Santiago Serra =

Portuguese footballer (born 2007)

Personal information
- Full name: Santiago Ferreira e Serra
- Date of birth: 23 January 2007 (age 19)
- Place of birth: Lisbon, Portugal
- Height: 1.85 m (6 ft 1 in)
- Position: Defensive midfielder

Team information
- Current team: Estrela Amadora
- Number: 78

Youth career
- Benfica
- 2019–2024: Belenenses
- 2024–2025: Mafra

Senior career*
Years	Team	Apps	(Gls)
2025–2026	Mafra	4	(0)
2026–	Estrela Amadora	8	(0)

International career^{‡}
2025	Portugal U18	2	(0)
2026–	Portugal U20	3	(0)
- * Club domestic league appearances and goals as of 9 November 2026 ‡ National team caps and goals as of 9 November 2026

Santiago Serra (born 23 January 2007) is a Portuguese professional footballer who plays as a defensive midfielder for Estrela Amadora.

== Club career ==
Born in Lisbon, Serra is a youth product of Benfica, Belenenses and Mafra, where he started his career in the third tier of Portuguese football.

In the summer 2026, he signed for Estrela Amadora in Primeira Liga.

Serra made his professional debut with Estrela Amadora on 9 November 2026, starting in a 2–2 Primeira Liga draw with Portuguese giants Sporting Portugal.

Impressing in games such as a 2–1 win against Braga in September, Serra became a regular starter with Amadora this autumn 2026.

== International career ==
Serra is a youth international for Portugal, having played for the under-18 and under-20.
