= Peru at the 2025 Junior Pan American Games =

- IOC code: PER
- NOC: Peruvian Olympic Committee

in Asunción, Paraguay
- Competitors: 115
- Medals: Gold 3 Silver 4 Bronze 14 Total 21

Junior Pan American Games appearances (overview)
- 2021; 2025

Peru is competing at the 2025 Junior Pan American Games in Asunción from August 9 to 23, 2025.

The Peruvian team consists of 115 athletes.

== Medals by sport ==
Sport	Gold	Silver	Bronze	Total
Fencing	1	0	2	3
Athletics	1	0	1	2
Golf	1	0	0	1
Taekwondo	0	1	3	4
Karate	0	1	0	1
Shooting	0	1	0	1
Squash	0	1	0	1
Sailing	0	0	2	2
Swimming	0	0	2	2
Badminton	0	0	1	1
Judo	0	0	1	1
Tennis	0	0	1	1
Weightlifting	0	0	1	1
Totals (13 entries)	3	4	14	21

== Medalists ==
The following Peruvian competitors won medals at the games.

Medal	Name	Sport	Event	Date
Gold	Verónica Huacasi	Athletics	Women's 3000m Steeplechase	August 22
Gold	Renzo Fukuda	Fencing	Men's Foil Individual	August 12
Gold	Ariana Urrea; Alejandro del Valle; Tiago Ledgard; Alexa Vegas	Golf	Mixed Team	August 21

== See also ==
- Peru at the Junior Pan American Games
