= Bolivia at the 2025 Junior Pan American Games =

- IOC code: BOL
- NOC: Bolivian Olympic Committee

in Asunción, Paraguay
- Competitors: 55 in 20 sports
- Flag bearer (closing): Sol Sandoval
- Medals: Gold 1 Silver 1 Bronze 4 Total 6

Junior Pan American Games appearances (overview)
- 2021; 2025

Bolivia competed at the 2025 Junior Pan American Games in Asunción, Paraguay from August 9 to 23, 2025.

The Bolivian team consisted of 55 athletes competing in 20 sports.

== Medals by sport ==
Sport	Gold	Silver	Bronze	Total
Fencing	1	0	0	1
Athletics	0	1	0	1
Karate	0	0	3	3
Taekwondo	0	0	1	1
Totals (4 entries)	1	1	4	6

== Medalists ==
The following Bolivian competitors won medals at the games.

Medal	Name	Sport	Event	Date
Gold	Esteban Mayer	Fencing	Men's individual sabre	August 10
Silver	David Ninavia	Athletics	Men's 10,000 m	August 21
Bronze	Juan Montalvo	Taekwondo	Men's kyorugi -80kg	August 16
Bronze	Sebastián Becerra	Karate	Men's -84kg	August 21
Bronze	Sol Sandoval	Karate	Women's -55kg	August 22
Bronze	Melani Unzueta	Karate	Women's -50kg	August 23

== See also ==
- Bolivia at the Junior Pan American Games
