= Archery at the 2025 Junior Pan American Games =

Archery at the 2025 Junior American Games
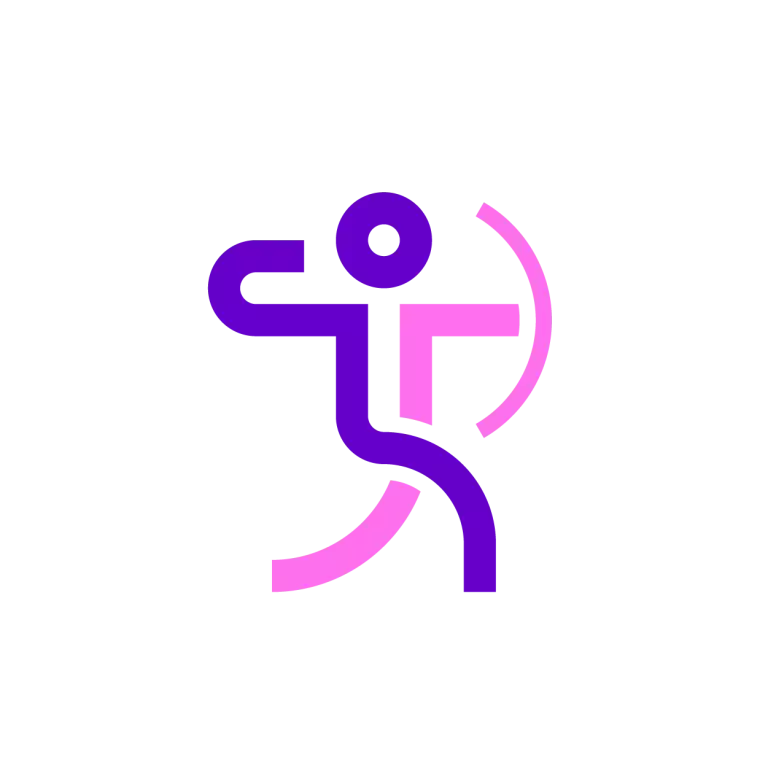
- Venue: National Archery Centre
- Start date: August 10, 2025
- End date: August 12, 2025
- No. of events: 8
- Competitors: 68

The archery events at the 2025 Junior Pan American Games were held at the National Archery Centre, located in the Olympic Park in Luque, in the Greater Asuncion area. The events were contested between August 10 and 12, 2025.

Eight events were contested: three for men, three for women and two mixed. The winner of each event qualified for the 2027 Pan American Games in Lima, Peru.

== Qualification ==
A total of 68 athletes qualified for the events. 30 athletes (15 men and 15 women) qualified through the 2024 Pan American Youth Championship in San Salvador, El Salvador, while another 30 qualified through a tournament in Buenos Aires, Argentina. As the host country, Paraguay qualified a total of four athletes. Additionally, four athletes qualified as wild cards.

== Medal summary ==
=== Medal table ===
* Host nation (Paraguay)

Rank	Nation	Gold	Silver	Bronze	Total
1	Brazil	3	1	0	4
2	Mexico	2	2	0	4
3	Colombia	1	1	2	4
4	Guatemala	1	1	0	2
5	Ecuador	1	0	0	1
6	United States	0	2	2	4
7	Canada	0	1	1	2
8	Argentina	0	0	2	2
9	Cuba	0	0	1	1
Totals (9 entries)		8	8	8	24

=== Medalists ===
==== Men ====
Event	Gold	Silver	Bronze
Individual recurve	Christian García; Guatemala	Andrés Hernández; Colombia	Esteban Silva; Argentina
Team recurve	Brazil; Leonardo Oliveira; Miguel Pereira	Guatemala; Ian Allen; Christian García	Colombia; Andrés Hernández; Javier Carrillo
Individual compound	Rafael Magalhães; Brazil	Lot Méndez; Mexico	Zachary Neilson; United States

==== Women ====
Event	Gold	Silver	Bronze
Individual recurve	Isabelle Estevez; Brazil	Janna Hawash; Canada	Alma Pueyo; Argentina
Team recurve	Mexico; Naomi Aguilar; Ángela Ruiz	Brazil; Sophia Baptista; Isabelle Estevez	Canada; Kylie Oliver; Janna Hawash
Individual compound	Blanca Rodrigo; Ecuador	Adriana Castillo; Mexico	Kaylee Gurney; United States

==== Mixed ====
Event	Gold	Silver	Bronze
Team recurve	Colombia; Tania Arias; Javier Carrillo	United States; Emma Kim; Jack Krengel	Cuba; Elaimis García; Abrham Pérez
Team compound	Mexico; Lot Méndez; Adriana Castillo	United States; Zachary Neilson; Kaylee Gurney	Colombia; Sebastián Villegas; Isabella Sepúlveda

== Results ==
=== Men's individual recurve ===
Date: August 10–12

Round of 32
17	B Nunzi (ARG)	0
16	J Roberts (BER)	6
9	J Peralta (ECU)	7
24	C Dinno (TTO)	1
25	G Ortiz (PAR)	0
8	K Ng (CAN)	6
21	J Mighty (JAM)	0
12	H Cueto (MEX)	6
13	D Cintrón (PUR)	2
20	L Áviles (ESA)	6
19	A Pérez (CUB)	5
14	C García (GUA)	6
11	F Marquez (MEX)	7
22	L Chang (GUY)	1
23	R Abramson (DOM)	1
10	E Silva (ARG)	7
15	H Pacheco (VEN)	6
18	M Pereira (BRA)	2

Round of 16
1	N Herzog (BOL)	5
16	J Roberts (BER)	6
9	J Peralta (ECU)	6
8	K Ng (CAN)	2
5	L Oliveira (BRA)	6
12	H Cueto (MEX)	4
20	L Áviles (ESA)	0
4	A Hernández (COL)	6
3	J Krengle (USA)	3
14	C García (GUA)	7
11	F Marquez (MEX)	6
6	I Allen (GUA)	0
7	A Contreras (CHI)	0
10	E Silva (ARG)	6
15	H Pacheco (VEN)	0
2	J Carrillo (COL)	6

Quarterfinals
16	J Roberts (BER)	6
9	J Peralta (ECU)	2
5	L Oliveira (BRA)	0
4	A Hernández (COL)	6
14	C García (GUA)	6
11	F Marquez (MEX)	2
10	E Silva (ARG)	6
2	J Carrillo (COL)	4

Semifinals
16	J Roberts (BER)	0
4	A Hernández (COL)	6
14	C García (GUA)	7
10	E Silva (ARG)	3

Finals
4	A Hernández (COL)	4
14	C García (GUA)	6
Bronze medal match
16	J Roberts (BER)	2
10	E Silva (ARG)	6

=== Men's team recurve ===
Date: August 10–12

Quarterfinals
5	E Silva (ARG); B Nunzi (ARG)	1
4	L Oliveira (BRA); M Pereira (BRA)	5

Semifinals
1	A Hernández (COL); J Carrillo (COL)	0
4	L Oliveira (BRA); M Pereira (BRA)	6
3	H Cueto (MEX); F Marquez (MEX)	4
2	I Allen (GUA); C García (GUA)	5

Final
4	L Oliveira (BRA); M Pereira (BRA)	6
2	I Allen (GUA); C García (GUA)	0
Bronze medal match
1	A Hernández (COL); J Carrillo (COL)	6
3	H Cueto (MEX); F Marquez (MEX)	0

=== Men's individual compound ===
Date: August 10–12

Round of 16
9	J García (ECU)	136
8	E Tillit (GUA)	142
5	R Magalhães (BRA)	144
12	B Romero (PAR)	128
13	L Rolle (BAH)	126
4	S Villegas (COL)	144
3	L Mendez (MEX)	144
14	A Orihuela (PER)	127
11	E Nunez (DOM)	136
6	D Camacho (VEN)	142
7	Z Neilson (USA)	143
10	A Luengo (ARG)	140

Quarterfinals
1	J Gonzalez (CRC)	140
8	E Tillit (GUA)	143
5	R Magalhães (BRA)	147
4	S Villegas (COL)	144
3	L Mendez (MEX)	145
6	D Camacho (VEN)	144
7	Z Neilson (USA)	146
2	A Infante (CHI)	145

Semifinals
8	E Tillit (GUA)	140
5	R Magalhães (BRA)	142
3	L Mendez (MEX)	143
7	Z Neilson (USA)	142

Finals
5	R Magalhães (BRA)	144
3	L Mendez (MEX)	142
Bronze medal match
8	E Tillit (GUA)	131
7	Z Neilson (USA)	144

=== Women's individual recurve ===
Date: August 10–12

Round of 32
17	W Labastida (VEN)	4
16	E Nakatani (PAR)	6
21	M Fernández (BOL)	0
12	N Aguilar (MEX)	6
13	K Sánchez (ECU)	0
20	A Catalán (CHI)	6
19	R Recinos (GUA)	0
14	K Urrego (COL)	6
11	A Zavala (PER)	6
22	G Díaz (DOM)	0
15	A Palomares (ESA)	7
18	J Vigil (ESA)	3

Round of 16
1	A Ruiz (MEX)	2
16	E Nakatani (PAR)	6
9	R Selley (BER)	3
8	S Baptista (BRA)	7
5	T Arias (COL)	7
12	N Aguilar (MEX)	1
20	A Catalán (CHI)	3
4	J Hawash (CAN)	7
3	I Estevez (BRA)	7
14	K Urrego (COL)	1
11	A Zavala (PER)	2
6	K Oliver (CAN)	6
7	E Kim (USA)	6
10	E García (CUB)	0
15	A Palomares (ESA)	0
2	A Pueyo (ARG)	6

Quarterfinals
16	E Nakatani (PAR)	0
8	S Baptista (BRA)	6
5	T Arias (COL)	1
4	J Hawash (CAN)	7
3	I Estevez (BRA)	6
6	K Oliver (CAN)	0
7	E Kim (USA)	0
2	A Pueyo (ARG)	6

Semifinals
8	S Baptista (BRA)	4
4	J Hawash (CAN)	6
3	I Estevez (BRA)	6
2	A Pueyo (ARG)	2

Final
4	J Hawash (CAN)	2
3	I Estevez (BRA)	6
Bronze medal match
8	S Baptista (BRA)	0
2	A Pueyo (ARG)	6

=== Women's team recurve ===
Date: August 10–12

Quarterfinals
5	A Palomares (ESA); J Vigil (ESA)	2
4	K Urrego (COL); T Arias (COL)	6

Semifinals
1	I Estevez (BRA); S Baptista (BRA)	5
4	K Urrego (COL); T Arias (COL)	4
3	K Oliver (CAN); J Hawash (CAN)	1
2	N Aguilar (MEX); A Ruiz (MEX)	5

Final
1	I Estevez (BRA); S Baptista (BRA)	4
2	N Aguilar (MEX); A Ruiz (MEX)	5
Bronze medal match
4	K Urrego (COL); T Arias (COL)	1
3	K Oliver (CAN); J Hawash (CAN)	5

=== Women's individual compound ===
Date: August 10–12

Round of 16
9	F Waib (BRA)	139
8	R Domínguez (CUB)	139
5	B Rodrigo (ECU)	137
12	J Gomez (ESA)	128
11	B Torres (PAR)	140
6	C de la Cruz (GUA)	142
7	V Villabos (CRC)	144
10	G Gonzalez (ARG)	140

Quarterfinals
1	K Gurney (USA)	146
8	R Domínguez (CUB)	143
5	B Rodrigo (ECU)	143
4	A Olea (CHI)	140
3	A Castillo (MEX)	147
6	C de la Cruz (GUA)	139
7	V Vilabos (CRC)	141
2	I Sepúlveda (COL)	143

Semifinals
1	K Gurney (USA)	142
5	B Rodrigo (ECU)	143
3	A Castillo (MEX)	145
2	I Sepúlveda (COL)	142

Final
5	B Rodrigo (ECU)	146
3	A Castillo (MEX)	141
Bronze medal match
1	K Gurney (USA)	142
2	I Sepúlveda (COL)	141

=== Recurve mixed team ===
Date: August 10–12

Round of 16
1	A Ruiz (MEX); F Marquez (MEX)	6
16	G Díaz (DOM); R Abramson (DOM)	0
9	E García (CUB); A Pérez (CUB)	6
8	K Sánchez (ECU); J Peralta (ECU)	2
5	T Arias (COL); J Carrillo (COL)	6
12	A Palomares (ESA); L Áviles (ESA)	2
13	A Catalán (CHI); A Contreras (CHI)	0
4	J Hawash (CAN); K Ng (CAN)	6
3	A Pueyo (ARG); E Silva (ARG)	6
14	M Fernández (BOL); N Herzog (BOL)	0
11	W Labastida (VEN); H Pacheco (VEN)	0
6	E Kim (USA); J Krengel (USA)	6
7	R Selley (BER); J Roberts (BER)	5
10	R Recinos (GUA); I Allen (GUA)	3
15	E Nakatani (PAR); G Ortiz (PAR)	0
2	I Estevez (BRA); L Oliveira (BRA)	6

Quarterfinals
1	A Ruiz (MEX); F Marquez (MEX)	2
9	E García (CUB); A Pérez (CUB)	6
5	T Arias (COL); J Carrillo (COL)	6
4	J Hawash (CAN); K Ng (CAN)	2
3	A Pueyo (ARG); E Silva (ARG)	4
6	E Kim (USA); J Krengel (USA)	5
7	R Selley (BER); J Roberts (BER)	5
2	I Estevez (BRA); L Oliveira (BRA)	3

Semifinals
9	E García (CUB); A Pérez (CUB)	4
5	T Arias (COL); J Carrillo (COL)	5
6	E Kim (USA); J Krengel (USA)	5
7	R Selley (BER); J Roberts (BER)	3

Final
5	T Arias (COL); J Carrillo (COL)	6
6	E Kim (USA); J Krengel (USA)	2
Bronze medal match
9	E García (CUB); A Pérez (CUB)	6
7	R Selley (BER); J Roberts (BER)	2

=== Compound mixed team ===
Date: August 10–12

Round of 16
9	G Gonzalez (ARG); A Luengo (ARG)	143
8	F Waib (BRA); R Magalhães (BRA)	150
7	B Rodrigo (ECU); J García (ECU)	149
10	B Torres (PAR); B Romero (PAR)	146

Quarterfinals
1	A Castillo (MEX); L Mendez (MEX)	155
8	F Waib (BRA); R Magalhães (BRA)	148
5	V Villabos (CRC); J Gonzalez (CRC)	149
4	A Olea (CHI); A Infante (CHI)	146
3	K Gurney (USA); Z Nielson (USA)	153
6	C de la Cruz (GUA); E Tillit (GUA)	149
7	B Rodrigo (ECU); J García (ECU)	147
2	I Sepúlveda (COL); S Villegas (COL)	156

Semifinals
1	A Castillo (MEX); L Mendez (MEX)	158
5	V Villabos (CRC); J Gonzalez (CRC)	151
3	K Gurney (USA); Z Nielson (USA)	157
2	I Sepúlveda (COL); S Villegas (COL)	143

Final
1	A Castillo (MEX); L Mendez (MEX)	153
3	K Gurney (USA); Z Nielson (USA)	140
Bronze medal match
5	V Villabos (CRC); J Gonzalez (CRC)	152
2	I Sepúlveda (COL); S Villegas (COL)	156
