= Athletics at the 2025 Junior Pan American Games =

Athletics at the 2025 Junior American Games
- Venue: Athletics Track
- Start date: August 18, 2025
- End date: August 22, 2025
- No. of events: 45
- Competitors: 430 from 38 nations

The athletics events at the 2025 Junior Pan American Games were held at the Athletics Track, located in the Olympic Park in Luque, in the Greater Asuncion area. The events were contested between August 18 and 22, 2025.

45 events were contested, 22 for men, 22 for women, and one mixed. The winner of each event qualified for the 2027 Pan American Games in Lima, Peru.

== Qualification ==
A total of 496 athletes qualified for the events, based on a Pan American area ranking. Fourteen athletes qualified for each track event except the relay events and the 3000 m steeplechase (12 athletes per race). Twelve qualified for each jumps and throws event. Ten qualified for each combined event (decathlon and heptathlon) and twelve for each race walk event.

== Medal summary ==
=== Medal table ===
* Host nation (Paraguay)

Rank	Nation	Gold	Silver	Bronze	Total
1	Cuba	8	3	2	13
2	Canada	7	7	1	15
3	Colombia	7	4	3	14
4	Mexico	4	5	10	19
5	Jamaica	4	4	4	12
6	Brazil	3	7	7	17
7	Puerto Rico	3	0	2	5
8	Argentina	2	1	3	6
9	Trinidad and Tobago	1	2	1	4
9	Venezuela	1	2	1	4
11	Dominican Republic	1	1	0	2
12	Cayman Islands	1	0	1	2
12	Paraguay*	1	0	1	2
12	Peru	1	0	1	2
15	Dominica	1	0	0	1
16	Ecuador	0	2	2	4
17	British Virgin Islands	0	1	1	2
17	Grenada	0	1	1	2
19	Barbados	0	1	0	1
19	Bermuda	0	1	0	1
19	Bolivia	0	1	0	1
19	Uruguay	0	1	0	1
19	Virgin Islands	0	1	0	1
24	Chile	0	0	2	2
24	Guyana	0	0	2	2
Totals (25 entries)		45	45	45	135

== Medalists ==
=== Men ===
Event	Gold		Silver		Bronze	
100 metres	Davonte Howell; Cayman Islands	9.98; JGR, PB	Ronal Longa; Colombia	10.07	Jaleel Croal; British Virgin Islands	10.16
200 metres	José Figueroa; Puerto Rico	20.16; JGR, NR	Jaleel Croal; British Virgin Islands	20.39; SB	Ronal Longa; Colombia	20.51; PB
400 metres	Jasauna Dennis; Jamaica	45.56; JGR	Jaden Marchan; Trinidad and Tobago	45.80	Vinícius Galeno; Brazil	45.83
800 metres	Miguel Ángel Pantojas; Puerto Rico	1:48.79; JGR	John O'Reilly; Canada	1:49.12	Amado Amador; Mexico	1:49.14
1500 metres	Jude Wheeler-Dee; Canada	3:45.08	Émile Toupin; Canada	3:45.29	Uriel Muñoz; Argentina	3:45.97
5000 metres	Pedro Marín; Colombia	14:11.50; JGR	Iker Sánchez; Mexico	14:13.14	Ian Sánchez; Mexico	14:14.42
10,000 metres	Pedro Marín; Colombia	30:57.80	David Ninavia; Bolivia	31:03.20	Nider Pecho; Peru	31:06.20
110 metres hurdles	Yander Herrera; Cuba	13.60	Thiago Ornelas; Brazil	13.61	Isaiah Patrick; Grenada	13.73; PB
400 metres hurdles	Tyreece Hyman; Jamaica	48.90	Matheus Lima; Brazil	49.28	Romario Stewart; Jamaica	50.11
3000 metres steeplechase	Oleisy Ferrer; Cuba	8:54.20; JGR	Mateus de Alencar; Brazil	8:57.82; PB	Roberto Márquez; Mexico	9:02.34
4 × 100 metres relay	Colombia; Carlos Flórez; Enoc Moreno; Óscar Baltán; Ronal Longa	38.99; JGR, AU23R	Jamaica; Requelme Reid; Jehlani Gordon; Odaine Crooks; Bouwahjgie Nkrumie	39.21	Argentina; Juan Agustín Sagasta; Lucas Villegas; Tomás Villegas; Tomás Mondino	39.45 NR
4 × 400 metres relay	Brazil; Vinícius Galeno; Jadson Lima; Matheus Lima; Elias dos Santos	3:03.76; JGR	Jamaica; Omary Robinson; Jasauna Dennis; Kevin Bliss; Tyrece Hyman	3:06.59	Puerto Rico; José Figueroa; Alejandro Rosado; Jarell Cruz; Nataenel Vigo	3:07.29
20,000 metres race walk	Miguel Peña; Colombia	1:23:06.10	Saul Wamputsrik; Ecuador	1:23:51.38	Brandon Pérez; Mexico	1:24:48.51
High jump	Diosber Hernández; Cuba	2.07 m	Santiago Barbería; Argentina	2.07 m PB	Jesús Vásquez; Mexico	2.07 m
Pole vault	Ricardo Montes de Oca; Venezuela	5.45 m JGR	Andreas Kreiss; Brazil	5.10 m	Agustín Carril; Argentina	5.00 m
Long jump	Aniel Molina; Cuba	7.95 m	Jhon Valencia; Colombia	7.39 m	Andrew Stone; Cayman Islands	7.37 m
Triple jump	Praise Aniamaka; Canada	16.94 m JGR, PB	Felipe Izidoro; Brazil	16.74 m PB	Chavez Penn; Jamaica	16.44 m
Shot put	Juan Arrieguez; Argentina	18.39 m	Vinícius Avancini; Brazil	18.31 m PB	Alessandro Borges; Brazil	17.97 m PB
Discus throw	Racquil Brodrick; Jamaica	61.79 m JGR	Christopher Young; Jamaica	59.34 m	Mateus Torres; Brazil	58.73 m PB
Hammer throw	Tomás Olivera; Argentina	70.61 m JGR	Jeremiah Nubbe; Canada	70.49 m	Benjamín Muñoz; Chile	67.04 m PB
Javelin throw	Lars Flaming; Paraguay	81.56 m JGR	Leikel Cabrera; Cuba	75.82 m	Thiago Lacerda; Brazil	69.77 m
Decathlon	Josmi Sánchez; Cuba	7550 pts JGR	Carlos Córdoba; Venezuela	7393 pts	Max Moraga; Chile	7304 pts
WR world record | AR area record | CR championship record | GR games record | NR national record | OR Olympic record | PB personal best | SB season best | WL world leading (in a given season)

=== Women ===
Event	Gold		Silver		Bronze	
100 metres	Shaniqua Bascombe; Trinidad and Tobago	11.19	Liranyi Alonso; Dominican Republic	11.40	Frances Colón; Puerto Rico	11.46
200 metres	Liranyi Alonso; Dominican Republic	22.69 JGR	Marlet Ospino; Colombia	23.14	Keliza Smith; Guyana	23.42
400 metres	Dianna Proctor; Canada	51.97; JGR	Caitlyn Bobb; Bermuda	52.14	Shanakeye Anderson; Jamaica	53.41
800 metres	Sabrina Pena; Brazil	2:05.87	Avery Pearson; Canada	2:06.09	María Rojas; Venezuela	2:06.10
1500 metres	Dafne Juárez; Mexico	4:23.58	Sabrina Salcedo; Mexico	4:24.87	Carmen Alder; Ecuador	4:25.20
5000 metres	Dafne Juárez; Mexico	15:51.27 GR	Jadyn Keeler; Canada	15:56.77	Sabrina Salcedo; Mexico	16:09.11
10,000 metres	Jadyn Keeler; Canada	34:16.61; JGR	Mariel Salazar; Mexico	36:04.08	Luz Rocha; Mexico	36:20.93
100 metres hurdles	Jocelyn Echazabal; Cuba	13.29	Maya Rollins; Barbados	13.51	Lays Cristina Rodrigues; Brazil	13.60
400 metres hurdles	Antonia Sánchez; Mexico	55.91	Michelle Smith; Virgin Islands	56.61	Daynea Colstock; Jamaica	58.78
3000 metres steeplechase	Verónica Huacasi; Peru	10:20.55	Laura Camargo; Colombia	10:42.47	Sofía Peña; Mexico	58.78
4 × 100 metres relay	Jamaica; Sabrina Dockery; Marissa Palmer; Serena Cole; Alana Reid	43.51; JGR	Trinidad and Tobago; Alexxe Henry; Shaniqua Bascombe; Sierra Joseph; Janae De Gannes	43.89	Colombia; Marlet Ospino; Laura Martínez; Danna Banquez; Natalia Linares	44.01
4 × 400 metres relay	Canada; Izzy Goudros; Emily Martin; Avery Pearson; Dianna Proctor	3:31.73; JGR	Jamaica; Shanque Williams; Oneika Brissett; Daynea Colstock; Shanakaye Anderson	3:31.74	Mexico; Jazmín López; Shakti Álvarez; Kenya Maturana; Antonia Sánchez	3:31.95
20,000 metres race walk	Karla Serrano; Mexico	1:31:40.10; JGR	Valeria Flores; Mexico	1:33:21.40	Natalia Pulido; Colombia	1:35:11.00
High jump	María Arboleda; Colombia	1.86 m	Ahshareah Enoe; Grenada	1.86 m	Tricia Madourie; Canada	1.82 m
Pole vault	Jennifer Elizarov; Canada	4.45 m JGR	Heather Abadie; Canada	4.00 m	Luana Gabriela de Moura; Brazil	3.90 m
Long jump	Natalia Linares; Colombia	6.92 m AU23R, JGR	Rosmaiby Quesada; Cuba	6.35 m	Janae De Gannes; Trinidad and Tobago	6.33 m
Triple jump	Lidsay González; Cuba	13.96 m PB	Paola del Real; Mexico	13.58 m	Ariday Girón; Cuba	13.43 m
Shot put	Treneese Hamilton; Dominica	17.21 m	Liv Sands; Canada	16.46 m	Belsy Quiñónez; Ecuador	16.40 m PB
Discus throw	Alejandra Mesa; Cuba	54.42 m	Ottaynis Febres; Venezuela	54.40 m PB	Maria Eduarda de Matos; Brazil	53.21 m PB
Hammer throw	Yarielis Torres; Puerto Rico	66.02 m	Nereida Santa Cruz; Ecuador	62.88 m	Paola Bueno; Mexico	61.84 m
Javelin throw	Valentina Barrios; Colombia	60.16 m JGR	Manuela Rotundo; Uruguay	57.44 m	Claudia Guerrero; Cuba	48.41 m
Heptathlon	Isabella Goudros; Canada	5561 pts	Ana Luísa Ferraz; Brazil	5508 pts	Ana Paula Argüello; Paraguay	5249 pts
WR world record | AR area record | CR championship record | GR games record | NR national record | OR Olympic record | PB personal best | SB season best | WL world leading (in a given season)

=== Mixed ===
Event	Gold		Silver		Bronze	
4 × 400 metres relay	Brazil; Jadson Lima; Elias dos Santos; Bianca de Almeida; Júlia Ribeiro	3:19.98	Cuba; Yohendris Bientz; Camila Rodríguez; Pierre Castillo; Melissa Padrón	3:21.01	Guyana; Malachi Austin; Narissa McPherson; Simeon Adams; Keliza Smith	3:22.30
WR world record | AR area record | CR championship record | GR games record | NR national record | OR Olympic record | PB personal best | SB season best | WL world leading (in a given season)

== Participation ==
- Antigua and Barbuda (3)
- Argentina (29)
- Aruba (1)
- Bahamas (4)
- Barbados (7)
- Belize (1)
- Bermuda (2)
- Bolivia (3)
- Brazil (53)
- British Virgin Islands (3)
- Canada (19)
- Cayman Islands (3)
- Chile (23)
- Colombia (26)
- Costa Rica (3)
- Cuba (32)
- Dominica (2)
- Dominican Republic (3)
- Ecuador (11)
- Grenada (5)
- Guatemala (6)
- Guyana (9)
- Honduras (2)
- Jamaica (40)
- Mexico (43)
- Nicaragua (1)
- Panama (2)
- Paraguay (22)
- Peru (12)
- Puerto Rico (24)
- Saint Kitts and Nevis (1)
- Saint Vincent and the Grenadines (1)
- El Salvador (3)
- Suriname (2)
- Trinidad and Tobago (14)
- Virgin Islands (2)
- Uruguay (3)
- Venezuela (10)
