= Ecuador at the 2025 Junior Pan American Games =

- IOC code: ECU
- NOC: Ecuadorian National Olympic Committee
- Website: www.coe.org.ec (in Spanish)

in Asunción, Paraguay 9 August 2025 – 23 August 2025
- Competitors: 111 (51 men and 60 women) in 22 sports
- Flag bearers: Pedro Benalcázar; Jéssica Palacios
- Medals Ranked 12th: Gold 6 Silver 13 Bronze 14 Total 33

Junior Pan American Games appearances (overview)
- 2021; 2025

Ecuador competed at the 2025 Junior Pan American Games in Asunción from August 9 to 23, 2025.

== Competitors ==
The following is the list of number of competitors (per gender) participating at the games per sport/discipline.

The Ecuadorian team consisted of 111 athletes.

Sport	Men	Women	Total
Archery	2	2	4
Artistic skating	1	1	2
Athletics	4	7	11
Badminton	1	0	1
Basketball 3x3	4	4	8
Canoeing	0	2	2
Cycling	3	6	9
Fencing	3	2	5
Gymnastics	2	5	7
Judo	2	2	4
Karate	2	2	4
Sailing	1	1	2
Speed skating	2	2	4
Squash	3	3	6
Swimming	4	6	10
Table tennis	2	2	4
Taekwondo	2	3	5
Tennis	3	2	5
Triathlon	2	2	4
Volleyball	2	0	2
Weightlifting	3	3	6
Wrestling	3	3	6
Total	51	60	111

== Medalists ==
Medal	Name	Sport	Event	Date
Gold	Jonathan Benavides	Judo	Men's –60 kg	10 August
Gold	Blanca Rodrigo	Archery	Women's individual compound	12 August
Gold	Nicolás García	Speed skating	Men's 5000 m points race	20 August
Gold	Jeremy Peralta	Wrestling	Men's Greco-Roman −67 kg	20 August
Gold	Jahaira Manrique	Karate	Women's kumite +68 kg	21 August
Gold	Jéssica Palacios	Weightlifting	Women's −63 kg	21 August
Silver	Alfredo Valdivieso	Judo	Men's –73 kg	11 August
Silver	Emilio Camacho; Francisco Castro	Tennis	Men's doubles	15 August
Silver	Ariana Álava; María Falconí; Rafaela García	Squash	Women's team	16 August
Silver	Mayte Caicedo	Taekwondo	Women's Kyorugi –67 kg	16 August
Silver	Natalie Revelo	Cycling	Women's road race	17 August
Silver	Ana Abad	Swimming	Women's 10 km open water	17 August
Silver	Jeremy Ulcuango	Speed skating	Men's 1000 m sprint	18 August
Silver	Saúl Wamputsrik	Athletics	Men's 20 km walk	19 August
Silver	Nicolás García	Speed skating	Men's 10,000 m elimination race	20 August
Silver	Fernanda Moncada	Speed skating	Women's 10,000 m elimination race	20 August
Silver	César Vallejo	Karate	Men's kumite +84 kg	21 August
Silver	Vicente Braulio	Weightlifting	Men's –98 kg	22 August
Silver	Nereida Santacruz	Athletics	Women's Hammer throw	22 August
Bronze	Laura Vásquez	Judo	Women's –48 kg	10 August
Bronze	Javier Romo	Squash	Men's singles	12 August
Bronze	María Falconí	Squash	Women's singles	12 August
Bronze	Rafaela García; María Falconí	Squash	Women's doubles	14 August
Bronze	Javier Romo; Martín Falconí; Esteban Dávalos	Squash	Men's team	16 August
Bronze	Emilio Camacho	Tennis	Men's singles	16 August
Bronze	Matvelin Espinoza	Taekwondo	Women's kyorugi +67 kg	16 August
Bronze	César Revelo; Joshua Robayo	Table tennis	Men's doubles	17 August
Bronze	Kevin Pazmino; Andrés Jaramillo; Kevin Preciado; Michael Torres	Basketball 3x3	Men's tournament	17 August
Bronze	Jeremy Ulcuango	Speed skating	Men's 500 m + distance	20 August
Bronze	Brittany Moncayo	Weightlifting	Women's −58 kg	20 August
Bronze	Carmen Alder	Athletics	Women's 1500 m	20 August
Bronze	Belsy Quiñónez	Athletics	Women's Shot put	21 August
Bronze	Damary Bravo	Weightlifting	Women's −69 kg	22 August

Medals by sport
Sport	1st place, gold medalist(s)	2nd place, silver medalist(s)	3rd place, bronze medalist(s)	Total
Speed skating	1	3	1	5
Weightlifting	1	1	2	4
Judo	1	1	1	3
Karate	1	1	0	2
Archery	1	0	0	1
Wrestling	1	0	0	1
Athletics	0	2	2	4
Squash	0	1	4	5
Taekwondo	0	1	1	2
Tennis	0	1	1	2
Cycling	0	1	0	1
Swimming	0	1	0	1
Basketball 3x3	0	0	1	1
Table tennis	0	0	1	1
Total	6	13	14	33

Medals by gender
Gender	1st place, gold medalist(s)	2nd place, silver medalist(s)	3rd place, bronze medalist(s)	Total
Male	3	7	6	16
Female	3	6	8	17
Mixed	0	0	0	0
Total	6	13	14	33

Medals by date
Date	1st place, gold medalist(s)	2nd place, silver medalist(s)	3rd place, bronze medalist(s)	Total
10 August	1	0	1	2
11 August	0	1	0	1
12 August	1	0	2	3
14 August	0	0	1	1
15 August	0	1	0	1
16 August	0	2	3	5
17 August	0	2	2	4
18 August	0	1	0	1
19 August	0	1	0	1
20 August	2	2	3	7
21 August	2	1	1	4
22 August	0	2	1	3
Total	6	13	14	33

Multiple medalists
Name	Sport	1st place, gold medalist(s)	2nd place, silver medalist(s)	3rd place, bronze medalist(s)	Total
Nicolás García	Speed skating	1	1	0	2
María Falconí	Squash	0	1	2	3
Emilio Camacho	Tennis	0	1	1	2
Rafaela García	Squash	0	1	1	2
Jeremy Ulcuango	Speed skating	0	1	1	2
Javier Romo	Squash	0	0	2	2

== Archery ==
Men

Athlete	Event	Ranking round		Round of 32	Round of 16	Quarterfinals	Semifinals	Final / BM	
Athlete	Event	Score	Seed	Opposition Score	Opposition Score	Opposition Score	Opposition Score	Opposition Score	Rank
Juan Pablo Peralta	Individual recurve	625	9	Dinnoo (TTO); W 7–1	Ng (CAN); W 6–2	Roberts (BER); L 2–6	Did not advance		
Josepth García	Individual compound	663	9	—N/a	Tillit (GUA); L 136–142	Did not advance			

Women

Athlete	Event	Ranking round		Round of 32	Round of 16	Quarterfinals	Semifinals	Final / BM	
Athlete	Event	Score	Seed	Opposition Score	Opposition Score	Opposition Score	Opposition Score	Opposition Score	Rank
Karen Sánchez	Individual recurve	570	13	Catalán (CHI); L 0–6	Did not advance				
Blanca Rodrigo	Individual compound	675	5	—N/a	Gómez (ESA); W 137–128	Olea (CHI); W 143–140	Gurney (USA); W 143–142	Gold medal match Castillo (MEX); W 146–141	1st place, gold medalist(s)

Mixed

Athlete	Event	Ranking round		Round of 16	Quarterfinals	Semifinals	Final / BM	
Athlete	Event	Score	Seed	Opposition Score	Opposition Score	Opposition Score	Opposition Score	Rank
Karen Sánchez; Juan Pablo Peralta	Team recurve	1195	8	García / Pérez (CUB); L 2–6	Did not advance			
Blanca Rodrigo; Josepth García	Team compound	1338	7	Torres / Romero (PAR); W 149–146	Sepúlveda / Villegas (COL); L 147–156	Did not advance		

== Athletics ==
Track and road events

Men

Athlete	Event	Semifinal		Final	
Athlete	Event	Time	Rank	Time	Rank
Jhon Chamba	20 km walk	—N/a		1:28:39.82	5
Saúl Wamputsrik	20 km walk	—N/a		1:23:51.38	2nd place, silver medalist(s)

Women

Athlete	Event	Semifinal		Final	
Athlete	Event	Time	Rank	Time	Rank
Carmen Alder	1500 m	—N/a		4:25.20	3rd place, bronze medalist(s)
Carmen Alder	5000 m	—N/a		16:36.93	4
Vanessa Alder	5000 m	—N/a		17:12.95	7
Vanessa Alder	10000 m	—N/a		38:22.01	7
Alison Guamán	3000 m steeplechase	—N/a		11:23.02	7
Leydi Raura	3000 m steeplechase	—N/a		10:58.28	4

Field events

Men

Athlete	Event	Final	
Athlete	Event	Result	Rank
Jholeixon Rodríguez	High jump	1.93	7
Yirmar Torres	Javelin throw	69.23	4

Women

Athlete	Event	Final	
Athlete	Event	Result	Rank
Belsy Quiñónez	Shot put	16.40	3rd place, bronze medalist(s)
Nereida Santacruz	Hammer throw	62.88	2nd place, silver medalist(s)
Hashly Ayoví	Javelin throw	41.95	7

== Badminton ==
Men

Athlete	Event	Round of 32	Round of 16	Quarterfinal	Semifinal	Final / BM	
Athlete	Event	Opposition Score	Opposition Score	Opposition Score	Opposition Score	Opposition Score	Rank
Judson Chilán	Singles	Morales (PUR); W 21–12, 21–13	Lai (CAN); L 7–21, 2–21	Did not advance			

== Basketball 3x3 ==
Athletes	Event	Group Stage			Quarterfinal	Semifinal	Final / BM	
Athletes	Event	Opposition Score	Opposition Score	Rank	Opposition Score	Opposition Score	Opposition Score	Rank
Andrés Jaramillo; Kevin Pazmino; Kevin Preciado; Michael Torres	Men's	Chile; L 17–19	Trinidad and Tobago; W 21–11	2 Q	Puerto Rico; W 21–20	Argentina; L 14–21	Bronze medal match Dominican Republic; W 21–16	3rd place, bronze medalist(s)
Marcia Astudillo; Noelia Morán; Hipatia Valencia; Nathalia Vicuña	Women's	Costa Rica; L 10–13	Argentina; W 13–11	3	Did not advance			

=== Men's tournament ===
Group Stage

15 August 2025
11:00

Report

Chile	19–17 (OT)	Ecuador
Pts: Barría 9		Pts: Preciado 10

Olympic Training Centre, Luque
Referees: Gonzalo Paz Chiapponi (URU) / María Fernanda Olivieri (ARG)

15 August 2025
17:00

Report

Trinidad and Tobago	11–21	Ecuador
Pts: Friday 5		Pts: Pazmino 9

Olympic Training Centre, Luque
Referees: Gonzalo Paz Chiapponi (URU) / Cynthia Pamela Núñez (DOM)

Quarterfinals

16 August 2025
19:30

Report

Puerto Rico	20–21	Ecuador
Pts: Navarro 7		Pts: Pazmino 9

Olympic Training Centre, Luque
Referees: Gonzalo Paz Chiapponi (URU) / Fernando Obreque (CHI)

Semifinal

17 August 2025
13:30

Report

Argentina	21–14	Ecuador
Pts: Molina 6		Pts: Pazmino 6

Olympic Training Centre, Luque
Referees: Gonzalo Paz Chiapponi (URU) / Fernando Obreque (CHI)

Bronze medal match

17 August 2025
18:50

Report

Dominican Republic	16–21	Ecuador
Pts: De Los Santos 8		Pts: Preciado 8

Olympic Training Centre, Luque
Referees: Hélio Augusto Santos (BRA) / Gonzalo Paz Chiapponi (URU)

=== Women's tournament ===
Group Stage

15 August 2025
16:30

Report

Ecuador	10–13	Costa Rica
Pts: Valencia 4		Pts: Alfaro 6

Olympic Training Centre, Luque
Referees: Fernando Obreque (CHI) / Katiuska Marchant (CHI)

16 August 2025
10:30

Report

Argentina	11–13	Ecuador
Pts: Buzzetti 6		Pts: Valencia 6

Olympic Training Centre, Luque
Referees: Hélio Augusto Santos (BRA) / Katiuska Marchant (CHI)

== Canoeing ==
Women

Athlete	Event	Heats		Semifinals		Final	
Athlete	Event	Time	Rank	Time	Rank	Time	Rank
Liliana Cárdenas	K-1 200 m	50.72	4 SF	50.29	1 F	48.19	7
Liliana Cárdenas	K-1 500 m	2:04.42	3 F	Bye		2:06.78	6
Liliana Cárdenas; Ginger Avilés	K-2 500 m	2:09.91	4 SF	2:09.14	3 F	2:17.79	7

== Cycling ==
=== BMX ===
Race

Athlete	Event	Seeding		Quarterfinal		Semifinal		Final	
Athlete	Event	Result	Rank	Points	Rank	Points	Rank	Result	Rank
Franco Mendizabal	Men's	35.139	8	9	3 Q	15	5	Did not advance	
María Alfaro	Women's	39.065	7	8	3 Q	11	4 Q	40.881	8
Doménica Mora	Women's	38.127	6	7	2 Q	10	3 Q	38.926	4

=== Mountain biking ===
Athlete	Event	Time	Rank
Daniela Machuca	Women's cross-country	1:29:34	12

=== Road ===
Men

Athlete	Event	Time	Rank
Kevin Navas	Road race	3:23:26	16
Alejandro Pita	Road race	3:23:26	33
Kevin Navas	Time trial	50:08.62	4

Women

Athlete	Event	Time	Rank
Marcela Peñafiel	Road race	2:51:19	5
Natalie Revelo	Road race	2:51:19	2nd place, silver medalist(s)
Natalia Vásquez	Time trial	38:38.94	4

== Fencing ==
Men

Athletes	Event	Group Stage						Round of 16	Quarterfinal	Semifinal	Final / BM	
Athletes	Event	Opposition Score	Opposition Score	Opposition Score	Opposition Score	Opposition Score	Rank	Opposition Score	Opposition Score	Opposition Score	Opposition Score	Rank
Bayardo Naranjo	Épée	Groupierre (ARG); W 5–1	Cabrera (CRC); W 5–1	Bravo (MEX); W 5–1	Marl. García (CUB); W 5–1	Schembri (ISV); L 3–5	2 Q	Marl. García (CUB); W 15–10	Gao (USA); L 8–15	Did not advance		
Tomás Aguinaga	Foil	Gálvez (BOL); W 5–3	Fumagalli (BRA); W 5–0	Galicia (MEX); W 5–2	Naranjo (CHI); W 5–0	—N/a	1 Q	Gallardo (PAR); W 15–6	García (PUR); L 9–15	Did not advance		
José Valencia Olmedo	Sabre	Mayer (BOL); L 2–5	Eichhorn (PER); L 0–5	Ruiz (PAR); W 5–3	Balón (CUB); L 3–5	—N/a	4 Q	Delgado (MEX); L 5–15	Did not advance			

Women

Athletes	Event	Group Stage						Round of 16	Quarterfinal	Semifinal	Final / BM	
Athletes	Event	Opposition Score	Opposition Score	Opposition Score	Opposition Score	Opposition Score	Rank	Opposition Score	Opposition Score	Opposition Score	Opposition Score	Rank
María Naranjo	Épée	Bottazzini (ARG); L 3–5	Correia (BRA); W 5–3	González (COL); L 2–5	Paredes (MEX); L 2–5	—N/a	4 Q	Linares (HON); W 15–3	Guerrero (VEN); L 7–15	Did not advance		
Kristin Naranjo	Foil	Cap (GUA); W 5–2	Montaño (BOL); W 5–4	Oropeza (MEX); W 5–1	Machado (VEN); L 3–5	—N/a	2 Q	Hernández (PUR); W 15–2	Machado (VEN); L 14–15	Did not advance		

== Karate ==
Men

Athlete	Event	Group stage				Semifinals	Final	
Athlete	Event	Opposition Result	Opposition Result	Opposition Result	Rank	Opposition Result	Opposition Result	Rank
Anthony Tamayo	Kumite −60 kg	Moreno (PER); W 5–4; Points	Dorta (USA); L 0–8; Points	Castillo (PAN); W 6–5; Points	3	Did not advance		
César Vallejo	Kumite +84 kg	Muñoz (BOL); W 3–3; Senshu	Rojas (CHI); W 8–0; Points	Gamboa (COL); W 2–0; Points	1 Q	Nogueira (BRA); W 3–3; Senshu	Sánchez (VEN); L 2–3; Hansoku	2nd place, silver medalist(s)

Women

Athlete	Event	Group stage				Semifinals	Final	
Athlete	Event	Opposition Result	Opposition Result	Opposition Result	Rank	Opposition Result	Opposition Result	Rank
Amy López	Kumite −68 kg	A. Hernández (CHI); W 8–0; Points	Juncosa (VEN); L 7–7; Senshu	Muñoz (MEX); L 1–4; Points	3	Did not advance		
Jahaira Manrique	Kumite +68 kg	Muñoz (CHI); W 4–2; Points	Tam (CAN); W 8–0; Points	—N/a	1 Q	Jennings (USA); W 8–4; Points	Amaral (BRA); W 1–0; Points	1st place, gold medalist(s)

== Roller sports ==
=== Artistic skating ===
Freestyle

Athlete	Event	Short program		Long program		Total	
Athlete	Event	Score	Rank	Score	Rank	Score	Rank
Christopher Paredes	Men's	39.37	4	68.42	4	107.79	4
Keyla Díaz	Women's	40.86	8	58.36	7	99.22	8

=== Speed skating ===
Men

Athlete	Event	Qualification		Semifinals		Final	
Athlete	Event	Time	Rank	Time	Rank	Time	Rank
Jeremy Ulcuango	200 m time trial	—N/a				18.440	8
Jeremy Ulcuango	500 m + distance	44.001	4 Q	44.617	2 Q	43.883	3rd place, bronze medalist(s)
Jeremy Ulcuango	1000 m sprint	1:26.630	2 Q	—N/a		1:29.574	2nd place, silver medalist(s)
Nicolás García	10000 m elimination	—N/a				15:36.870	2nd place, silver medalist(s)
Nicolás García	5000 m points race	—N/a				24	1st place, gold medalist(s)

Women

Athlete	Event	Qualification		Semifinals		Final	
Athlete	Event	Time	Rank	Time	Rank	Time	Rank
Madeleine Congo	200 m time trial	—N/a				19.937	8
Madeleine Congo	500 m + distance	47.384	7 Q	48.068	3 b	47.601	7
Fernanda Moncada	10000 m elimination	—N/a				18:47.212	2nd place, silver medalist(s)
Fernanda Moncada	1000 m sprint	1:31.395	3 q	—N/a		1:36.582	5
Fernanda Moncada	5000 m points race	—N/a				9	4

== Sailing ==
Men

Athlete	Event	Race					Total Points	Net points	Final rank
Athlete	Event	1	2	3	4	5	Total Points	Net points	Final rank
Tadas Koreiva	ILCA 7	10	~~17~~; ~~[STP]~~	10	13	16	66	49	15

STP= Standard Penalty. Highest race scores get deleted.

Women

Athlete	Event	Race					Total Points	Net points	Final rank
Athlete	Event	1	2	3	4	5	Total Points	Net points	Final rank
Moira Padilla	ILCA 6	~~12~~; ~~[STP]~~	9	12	8	9	50	38	10

STP= Standard Penalty. Highest race scores get deleted.

== Squash ==
Men

Athlete	Event	Round of 32	Round of 16	Quarterfinals	Semifinals	Final	
Athlete	Event	Opposition Score	Opposition Score	Opposition Score	Opposition Score	Opposition Score	Rank
Martín Falconí	Singles	Ballón (PER); W 3–0 (11–5, 11–8, 11–4)	Se. Portabales (ARG); L 0–3 (6–11, 3–11, 7–11)	Did not advance			
Javier Romo	Singles	Bye	Benn (BAR); W 3–0 (11–5, 13–11, 11–9)	Medina (MEX); W 3–1 (6–11, 11–8, 11–9, 11–7)	Torres (COL); L 0–3 (7–11, 7–11, 2–11)	Did not advance	3rd place, bronze medalist(s)
Esteban Dávalos; Martín Falconí	Doubles	—N/a	Bye	Alfonso / Sa. Portabales (ARG); L 0–2 (5–11, 9–11)	Did not advance		
Esteban Dávalos; Martín Falconí; Javier Romo	Team	—N/a	Bye	Guatemala; W 2–0	Argentina; L 1–2	Did not advance	3rd place, bronze medalist(s)

Women

Athlete	Event	Round of 32	Round of 16	Quarterfinals	Semifinals	Final	
Athlete	Event	Opposition Score	Opposition Score	Opposition Score	Opposition Score	Opposition Score	Rank
María Falconí	Singles	Bye	Botello (MEX); W 3–1 (8–11, 11–3, 11–7, 12–10)	Bernard (ARG); W 3–0 (11–6, 13–11, 11–3)	Silva (BRA); L 0–3 (9–11, 5–11, 4–11)	Did not advance	3rd place, bronze medalist(s)
Rafaela García	Singles	Vilches (CHI); W 3–0 (11–1, 11–4, 11–5)	Gatti (PAR); L 0–3 (5–11, 5–11, 7–11)	Did not advance			
María Falconí; Rafaela García	Doubles	—N/a	Bye	Aznarez / Bernard (ARG); W 2–1 (11–9, 9–11, 11–7)	Botello / Franco (MEX); L 1–2 (11–7, 5–11, 9–11)	Did not advance	3rd place, bronze medalist(s)
Ariana Álava; María Falconí; Rafaela García	Team	—N/a	Bye	Argentina; W 2–0	Paraguay; W 2–1	Mexico; L 0–2	2nd place, silver medalist(s)

Mixed

Athlete	Event	Round of 16	Quarterfinals	Semifinals	Final	
Athlete	Event	Opposition Score	Opposition Score	Opposition Score	Opposition Score	Rank
Ariana Álava; Javier Romo	Doubles	Bye	L. Castillo / A. Castillo (PER); L 0–2 (3–11, 10–11)	Did not advance		

== Swimming ==
Men

Athlete	Event	Heat		Final	
Athlete	Event	Time	Rank	Time	Rank
Luis Jiménez	200 m freestyle	1:58.67	22	Did not advance	
Luis Jiménez	400 m freestyle	4:11.03	15 q	4:09.47	14
Luis Jiménez	800 m freestyle	—N/a		8:41.84	14
Juan León	100 m breaststroke	1:03.45	9 q	1:03.45	10
Juan León	200 m breaststroke	2:20.81	12 q	2:21.32	10
Juan León	200 m individual medley	2:09.85	10	2:12.45	14
Juan Aguirre	10 km open water	—N/a		1:54:58.5	6
Juan Alcívar	10 km open water	—N/a		1:57:50.1	8

Women

Athlete	Event	Heat		Final	
Athlete	Event	Time	Rank	Time	Rank
Eva Andrade	50 m freestyle	DNS		Did not advance	
Eva Andrade	100 m freestyle	58.93	15 q	58.93	14
Elvira Espinosa	100 m freestyle	1:00.77	31	Did not advance	
Eva Andrade	200 m freestyle	2:08.08	15 q	2:08.62	16
Eva Andrade	100 m backstroke	1:08.52	20	Did not advance	
María Contreras	100 m backstroke	1:05.07	12 q	1:05.68	11
María Contreras	200 m backstroke	2:21.34	11 q	2:22.31	13
Elvira Espinosa	100 m butterfly	1:03.83	12 q	1:02.50	9
Emma Sabando	100 m butterfly	1:01.77	5 Q	1:02.06	6
Elvira Espinosa	200 m butterfly	2:17.18	5 Q	2:17.05	6
Eva Andrade; María Contreras; Elvira Espinosa; Emma Sabando	4 × 100 m freestyle relay	4:03.88	9	Did not advance	
Eva Andrade; María Contreras; Elvira Espinosa; Emma Sabando	4 × 200 m freestyle relay	DNS		Did not advance	
Ana Abad	10 km open water	—N/a		2:01:17.8	2nd place, silver medalist(s)
Danna Martínez	10 km open water	—N/a		DNF	

Mixed

Athlete	Event	Heat		Final	
Athlete	Event	Time	Rank	Time	Rank
Eva Andrade; Elvira Espinosa; Luis Jiménez; Juan León	4 × 100 m freestyle relay	3:55.29	18	Did not advance	
María Contreras; Luis Jiménez; Juan León; Emma Sabando	4 × 100 m medley relay	4:06.53	9	Did not advance	

== Table tennis ==
Men

Athletes	Event	Group Stage				Round of 32	Round of 16	Quarterfinal	Semifinal	Final	
Athletes	Event	Opposition Score	Opposition Score	Opposition Score	Rank	Opposition Score	Opposition Score	Opposition Score	Opposition Score	Opposition Score	Rank
César Revelo	Singles	—N/a				Martínez (CUB); L 2–4	Did not advance				
Joshua Robayo	Singles	—N/a				Alin (ARG); W 4–2	Bertolo (PAR); W 4–3	Iizuka (BRA); L 1–4	Did not advance		
César Revelo; Joshua Robayo	Doubles	—N/a					Maqueira / Martínez (CUB); W 3–2	Alin / Callaba (ARG); W 3–2	Doti / Iizuka (BRA); L 0–3	Did not advance	3rd place, bronze medalist(s)
César Revelo; Joshua Robayo	Team	Mexico; L 1–3	United States; L 1–3	Cuba; L 1–3	4	—N/a		Did not advance			

Women

Athletes	Event	Group Stage				Round of 32	Round of 16	Quarterfinal	Semifinal	Final	
Athletes	Event	Opposition Score	Opposition Score	Opposition Score	Rank	Opposition Score	Opposition Score	Opposition Score	Opposition Score	Opposition Score	Rank
Keimy Anchundia	Singles	—N/a				Aguilar (MEX); L 3–4	Did not advance				
Angélica Arellano	Singles	—N/a				Sosa (DOM); W 4–0	Aspathi (USA); W 4–2	Chan (CAN); L 0–4	Did not advance		
Keimy Anchundia; Angélica Arellano	Doubles	—N/a					Corado / Cux (GUA); W 3–2	Chan / Xu (CAN); L 2–3	Did not advance		
Keimy Anchundia; Angélica Arellano	Team	Mexico; W 3–2	Colombia; L 2–3	Trinidad and Tobago; W 3–1	2 Q	—N/a		United States; L 0–3	Did not advance		

Mixed

Athletes	Event	Round of 32	Round of 16	Quarterfinal	Semifinal	Final	
Athletes	Event	Opposition Score	Opposition Score	Opposition Score	Opposition Score	Opposition Score	Rank
Angélica Arellano; Joshua Robayo	Doubles	Aguilar / Martín (MEX); W 3–0	Aspathi / Xie (USA); L 2–3	Did not advance			
Keimy Anchundia; César Revelo	Doubles	Figueroa / Buenrostro (MEX); L 0–3	Did not advance				

== Tennis ==
Men

Athlete	Event	Preliminaries	Round of 32	Round of 16	Quarterfinals	Semifinals	Final / BM	
Athlete	Event	Opposition Score	Opposition Score	Opposition Score	Opposition Score	Opposition Score	Opposition Score	Rank
Emilio Camacho	Singles	Bye	Rendón (ESA); W 6–2, 6–1	Frutos (PAR); W 6–2, 6–3	Baena (PER); W 4–6, 6–4, 6–0	Pagani (ARG); L 6–1, 6–7^{(1–7)}, 0–6	Bronze medal match Álvarez (PUR); W 6–3, 7–5	3rd place, bronze medalist(s)
Francisco Castro	Singles	Bye	Vertberger (ARG); W 7–6^{(7–2)}, 6–2	Álvarez (PUR); L 1–6, 3–6	Did not advance			
Ángel Véliz	Singles	Bye	Vázquez (URU); L 6–1, 2–6, 1–6	Did not advance				
Emilio Camacho; Francisco Castro	Doubles	—N/a		Bye	Mejía / Rendón (ESA); W 6–1, 6–4	Albieri / Winheski (BRA); W 3–6, 6–4, [10–4]	Gold medal match Pagani / Vertberger (ARG); L 3–6, 1–6	2nd place, silver medalist(s)

Women

Athlete	Event	Preliminaries	Round of 32	Round of 16	Quarterfinals	Semifinals	Final / BM	
Athlete	Event	Opposition Score	Opposition Score	Opposition Score	Opposition Score	Opposition Score	Opposition Score	Rank
Manuela Moscoso	Singles	Bye	Delmas (PAR); L 0–6, 2–6	Did not advance				
Valentina Vargas	Singles	Bye	Cárdenas (MEX); W 6–3, 6–7^{(5–7)}, 6–4	Meabe (ARG); L 1–6, 0–6	Did not advance			
Manuela Moscoso; Valentina Vargas	Doubles	—N/a		Bye	Maguiña / Muelle (PER); L 0–6, 3–6	Did not advance		

Mixed

Athlete	Event	Round of 16	Quarterfinal	Semifinal	Final / BM	
Athlete	Event	Opposition Score	Opposition Score	Opposition Score	Opposition Score	Rank
Ángel Véliz; Valentina Vargas	Doubles	Balderrama / De Armas (VEN); L 5–7, 2–6	Did not advance			

== Triathlon ==
Individual

Athlete	Event	Time						Rank
Athlete	Event	Swim (750 m)	Trans 1	Bike (19.8 km)	Trans 2	Run (5 km)	Total	Rank
Thomas Chica	Men's	10:52	0:43	28:00	0:22	15:02	55:01	5
David Vega	Men's	10:45	0:45	28:04	0:21	15:22	55:20	9
Melanie Agreda	Women's	13:17	0:50	34:11	0:21	20:12	1:08:53	22
María Bonilla	Women's	12:24	0:47	30:35	0:20	18:05	1:02:12	7

Relay

Athlete	Event	Time						Rank
Athlete	Event	Swim	Trans 1	Bike	Trans 2	Run	Total	Rank
Melanie Agreda	Mixed relay	6:17	0:46	10:59	0:22	5:58	24:22	—N/a
David Vega	Mixed relay	6:10	0:45	9:32	0:21	4:58	21:46	—N/a
María Bonilla	Mixed relay	7:01	0:48	10:38	0:20	5:10	23:57	—N/a
Thomas Chica	Mixed relay	5:08	0:43	8:51	0:19	5:15	20:16	—N/a
Total	Mixed relay	—N/a					1:30:21	6

== Volleyball ==
=== Beach ===
Athletes	Event	Preliminary round				Round of 16	Quarterfinal	Semifinal	Final / BM	
Athletes	Event	Opposition Score	Opposition Score	Opposition Score	Rank	Opposition Score	Opposition Score	Opposition Score	Opposition Score	Rank
Isaac Jiménez; José Bowen	Men's	Gómez / Verane (CUB); L 0–2 (12–21, 10–21)	González / Inostroza (ARG); L 0–2 (9–21, 16–21)	Basey / Hurst (USA); L 0–2 (15–21, 17–21)	4	—N/a		Classification 13º-16º López / Umaña (NCA); W 2–1 (21–15, 14–21, 15–11)	Classification 13º-14º Durán / Valverde (BOL); W 2–0 (21–14, 21–18)	13

== Weightlifting ==
Men

Athlete	Event	Snatch		Clean & Jerk		Total	Rank
Athlete	Event	Result	Rank	Result	Rank	Total	Rank
Darwin Vera	−65 kg	115	5	145	4	260	4
Elkin Ramírez	−88 kg	137	6	184	3	321	4
Vicente Braulio	−98 kg	150	2	170	2	320	2nd place, silver medalist(s)

Women

Athlete	Event	Snatch		Clean & Jerk		Total	Rank
Athlete	Event	Result	Rank	Result	Rank	Total	Rank
Brittany Moncayo	−58 kg	80	3	106	2	186	3rd place, bronze medalist(s)
Jéssica Palacios	−63 kg	100	1	122	1	222	1st place, gold medalist(s)
Damary Bravo	−69 kg	100	2	115	3	215	3rd place, bronze medalist(s)

== See also ==
- Ecuador at the Junior Pan American Games
