= Tennis at the Junior Pan American Games =

- Frequency: Every four years
- Inaugurated: 2021
- Most recent: 2025
- Most successful team(s): Argentina

Tennis tournaments have been held at the Junior Pan American Games since its first edition in 2021. It currently has a total of 5 events (2 boys tournaments, 2 girls tournaments, and 1 mixed one).

== Summary ==
Games	Year	Venue	Events	Best Nation
I	(Colombia) 2021	Club Campestre de Cali	5	Peru
II	(Paraguay) 2025	Rakiura Resort	5	Argentina

== Overall medal table ==
Updated with 2025 results.

Rank	Nation	Gold	Silver	Bronze	Total
1	Argentina	4	3	1	8
2	Peru	3	1	2	6
3	Colombia	2	0	0	2
4	Brazil	1	0	2	3
5	Mexico	0	2	1	3
6	Ecuador	0	1	2	3
6	Paraguay	0	1	2	3
8	Bolivia	0	1	0	1
8	Puerto Rico	0	1	0	1
Totals (9 entries)		10	10	10	30

== Medalists ==
=== Boys' singles ===
Games	Gold	Silver	Bronze
2021 Cali-Valle	Gonzalo Bueno (PER)	Juan Carlos Prado Ángelo (BOL)	Álvaro Guillén Meza (ECU)
2025 Asunción	João Pedro Didoni Bonini (BRA)	Dante Pagani (ARG)	Emilio Camacho (ECU)

=== Boys' doubles ===
Games	Gold	Silver	Bronze
2021 Cali-Valle	Gonzalo Bueno (PER); Ignacio Buse (PER)	Juan Manuel La Serna (ARG); Lautaro Ballesteros (ARG)	Daniel Vallejo (PAR); Martin Vergara (PAR)
2025 Asunción	Dante Pagani (ARG); Ian Vertberger (ARG)	Emilio Camacho (ECU); Francisco José Castro (ECU)	Gustavo Albieri (BRA); Victor Winheski (BRA)

=== Girls' singles ===
Games	Gold	Silver	Bronze
2021 Cali-Valle	Luciana Moyano (ARG)	Leyla Britez (PAR)	Daianne Hayashida (PER)
2025 Asunción	Valentina Mediorreal (COL)	Sol Larraya Guidi (ARG)	Candela Vazquez (ARG)

=== Girls' doubles ===
Games	Gold	Silver	Bronze
2021 Cali-Valle	Daianne Hayashida (PER); Lucciana Pérez (PER)	Julia García (MEX); Maria F. Martínez (MEX)	Ana Candiotto (BRA); Juliana Munhoz (BRA)
2025 Asunción	Sol Larraya Guidi (ARG); Candela Vazquez (ARG)	Marianne Angel (MEX); Hanne Estrada (MEX)	Francesca Maguiña (PER); Yleymi Muelle (PER)

=== Mixed doubles ===
Games	Gold	Silver	Bronze
2021 Cali-Valle	Lautaro Ballesteros (ARG); Luciana Moyano (ARG)	Christopher Ludeña (PER); Lucciana Pérez (PER)	Emiliano Aguilera (MEX); Julia García Ruiz (MEX)
2025 Asunción	Juan Bolívar (COL); Valentina Mediorreal (COL)	Yannik Álvarez (PUR); Aurora Lugo (PUR)	Alex Núñez (PAR); Catalina Delmas (PAR)
