= Speed skating at the 2025 Junior Pan American Games =

Speed skating at the 2025 Junior American Games
- Venue: National Skating Centre
- Start date: August 18, 2025
- End date: August 20, 2025
- No. of events: 10

The speed skating events at the 2025 Junior Pan American Games were held at the National Skating Centre, located in the Olympic Park in Luque, in the Greater Asuncion area. The events were contested between August 18 and 20, 2025.

Ten events were contested, five for men and five for women. The 1 lap and 10,000 points race events were dropped while the 5,000 m points event was added for the 2025 games. The winner of each event, except the 5000 m points event, qualified for the 2027 Pan American Games in Lima, Peru.

== Qualification ==
Qualification was based on the results from the Pan American Speed Skating Championships.

== Medal summary ==
=== Medal table ===
* Host nation (Paraguay)

Rank	Nation	Gold	Silver	Bronze	Total
1	Colombia	8	1	1	10
2	Ecuador	1	3	1	5
3	United States	1	2	0	3
4	El Salvador	0	2	0	2
5	Chile	0	1	4	5
6	Venezuela	0	1	3	4
7	Guatemala	0	0	1	1
Totals (7 entries)		10	10	10	30

=== Medalists ===
==== Men ====
Event	Gold	Silver	Bronze
200 m time trial	Santiago Vásquez; Colombia	Jacob Melton; United States	Faberson Bonilla; Guatemala
500 m + distance	Santiago Vásquez; Colombia	Jacob Melton; United States	Jeremy Ulcuango; Ecuador
10,000 m elimination race	Sebastián Flórez; Colombia	Nicolás García; Ecuador	Gabriel Reyes; Chile
1000 m sprint	Jacob Melton; United States	Jeremy Ulcuango; Ecuador	Santiago Vásquez; Colombia
5000 m points race	Nicolás García; Ecuador	Sebastián Flórez; Colombia	Gabriel Reyes; Chile

==== Women ====
Event	Gold	Silver	Bronze
200 m time trial	Kollin Castro; Colombia	Ivonne Nóchez; El Salvador	Wilmary Toro; Venezuela
500 m + distance	Kollin Castro; Colombia	Ivonne Nóchez; El Salvador	Wilmary Toro; Venezuela
10,000 m elimination race	Yicel Giraldo; Colombia	Fernanda Moncada; Ecuador	Camila Carreño; Chile
1000 m sprint	Kollin Castro; Colombia	Wilmary Toro; Venezuela	Catalina Lorca; Chile
5000 m points race	Yicel Giraldo; Colombia	Camila Carreño; Chile	Daniela Bustamante; Venezuela

== Results ==
=== Men's 200 metres time trial ===
Final – August 18

Rank	Athlete	Nation	Time	Notes
1st place, gold medalist(s)	Santiago Vásquez	Colombia	17.724	JGR
2nd place, silver medalist(s)	Jacob Melton	United States	17.869	
3rd place, bronze medalist(s)	Faberson Bonilla	Guatemala	18.060	
4	Guilherme Abel Rocha	Brazil	18.104	
5	Sebastián Lillo	Chile	18.221	
6	José Carlos Rojas	Venezuela	18.355	
7	Josue Cantu	Mexico	18.362	
8	Jeremy Ulcuango	Ecuador	18.440	
9	Ricardo Murillo	El Salvador	18.958	
10	José Luis Santos	Dominican Republic	19.878	

=== Women's 200 metres time trial ===
Final – August 18

Rank	Athlete	Nation	Time	Notes
1st place, gold medalist(s)	Kollin Castro	Colombia	18.776	JGR
2nd place, silver medalist(s)	Ivonne Nochez	El Salvador	18.936	
3rd place, bronze medalist(s)	Wilmary Toro	Venezuela	19.339	
4	Catalina Lorca	Chile	19.453	
5	Naim Bucio	Mexico	19.477	
6	Helen Rivera	Guatemala	19.520	
7	Alicia McBride	United States	19.691	
8	Madeleine Congo	Ecuador	19.937	
9	Camila Aquino	Argentina	19.980	
10	Lizza Galeano	Paraguay	21.752	

=== Men's 500 metres + distance ===
August 19–20

Rank	Athlete	Nation	Qualifying		Semifinal		Final	
Rank	Athlete	Nation	Time	Notes	Time	Notes	Time	Notes
1st place, gold medalist(s)	Santiago Vásquez	Colombia	43.732	Q	44.314	F	43.626	
2nd place, silver medalist(s)	Jacob Melton	United States	43.469	Q	44.208	F	43.790	
3rd place, bronze medalist(s)	Jeremy Ulcuango	Ecuador	44.001	Q	44.617	F	43.883	
4	José Carlos Rojas	Venezuela	43.965	Q	44.486	F	DQSF	
5	Sebastián Lillo	Chile	44.291	Q	46.413	f	44.993	
6	Faberson Bonilla	Guatemala	44.056	Q	45.627	f	45.459	
7	Guilherme Abel Rocha	Brazil	44.259	Q	44.926	f	45.606	
8	Josue Cantu	Mexico	44.305	Q	44.981	f	45.742	
9	Ricardo Murillo	El Salvador	45.731		Did not advance			
10	José Luis Santos	Dominican Republic	47.078		Did not advance			

=== Women's 500 metres + distance ===
August 19–20

Rank	Athlete	Nation	Qualifying		Semifinal		Final	
Rank	Athlete	Nation	Time	Notes	Time	Notes	Time	Notes
1st place, gold medalist(s)	Kollin Castro	Colombia	45.208	Q	46.134	F	46.023	
2nd place, silver medalist(s)	Ivonne Nochez	El Salvador	45.479	Q	46.887	F	47.014	
3rd place, bronze medalist(s)	Wilmary Toro	Venezuela	45.521	Q	47.017	F	47.654	
4	Catalina Lorca	Chile	47.304	Q	46.504	F	DQSF	
5	Helen Rivera	Guatemala	46.890	Q	46.963	f	47.001	
6	Camila Aquino	Argentina	47.344	Q	48.167	f	47.504	
7	Madeleine Congo	Ecuador	47.384	Q	48.068	f	47.601	
8	Alicia McBride	United States	47.561	Q	47.008	f	47.630	
9	Naim Bucio	Mexico	47.756		Did not advance			
10	Lizza Galeano	Paraguay	50.581		Did not advance			

=== Men's 10,000 metres elimination race ===
Final – August 20

Rank	Athlete	Nation	Time	Notes
1st place, gold medalist(s)	Sebastián Flórez	Colombia	15:36.860	
2nd place, silver medalist(s)	Nicolás García	Ecuador	15:36.870	
3rd place, bronze medalist(s)	Gabriel Reyes	Chile	15:37.573	
4	Jokin Ziaurriz	Argentina	EL	
5	Alejandro Castañeda	Mexico	EL	
6	Brandon Torres	Venezuela	EL	
7	Ryan Dawson	United States	EL	
8	Ian Matus	Costa Rica	EL	
9	Allan López	Guatemala	EL	
10	Guilherme Abel Rocha	Brazil	EL	
11	Dayan Millan	Cuba	EL	
12	Sergio Sena	Dominican Republic	EL	

=== Women's 10,000 metres elimination race ===
Final – August 20

Rank	Athlete	Nation	Time	Notes
1st place, gold medalist(s)	Yicel Giraldo	Colombia	18:46.903	
2nd place, silver medalist(s)	Fernanda Moncada	Ecuador	18:47.212	
3rd place, bronze medalist(s)	Camila Carreño	Chile	18:47.413	
4	Naiara Sagasti	Argentina	EL	
5	Daniela Bustamante	Venezuela	EL	
6	Gabriella Pasquarella	United States	EL	
7	Sofía Rojas	Costa Rica	EL	
8	Brianda Carmona	Mexico	EL	
9	Luisa Sandoval	Guatemala	EL	
10	Amanda Vilches	Cuba	EL	
11	Lizza Galeano	Paraguay	EL	
12	Ashley Caballero	El Salvador	EL	

=== Men's 1000 metres sprint ===
August 18

Rank	Athlete	Nation	Qualifying		Final	
Rank	Athlete	Nation	Time	Notes	Time	Notes
1st place, gold medalist(s)	Jacob Melton	United States	1:24.744	Q, JGR	1:29.311	
2nd place, silver medalist(s)	Jeremy Ulcuango	Ecuador	1:26.630	Q	1:29.574	
3rd place, bronze medalist(s)	Santiago Vásquez	Colombia	1:24.988	q	1:30.162	
4	Gabriel Reyes	Chile	1:25.139	q	1:30.181	
5	Ian Matus	Costa Rica	1:26.329	q	1:30.513	
6	Jokin Ziaurriz	Argentina	1:26.715	q	1:30.670	
7	Josue Cantu	Mexico	1:26.679	q	1:30.802	
8	Allan López	Guatemala	1:26.679	q	1:31.749	
9	José Carlos Rojas	Venezuela	1:26.902		Did not advance	
10	Guilherme Abel Rocha	Brazil	1:27.394		Did not advance	
11	Ricardo Murillo	El Salvador	1:29.152		Did not advance	
12	Dayan Millan	Cuba	1:29.987		Did not advance	
13	Sergio Sena	Dominican Republic	1:30.380		Did not advance	

=== Women's 1000 metres sprint ===
August 18

Rank	Athlete	Nation	Qualifying		Final	
Rank	Athlete	Nation	Time	Notes	Time	Notes
1st place, gold medalist(s)	Kollin Castro	Colombia	1:33.479	Q	1:34.946	
2nd place, silver medalist(s)	Wilmary Toro	Venezuela	1:31.257	Q, JGR	1:35.576	
3rd place, bronze medalist(s)	Catalina Lorca	Chile	1:34.630	q	1:35.920	
4	Ivonne Nochez	El Salvador	1:31.642	q	1:36.077	
5	Fernanda Moncada	Ecuador	1:31.395	q	1:36.582	
6	Camila Aquino	Argentina	1:34.716	q	1:36.642	
7	Helen Rivera	Guatemala	1:32.142	q	1:37.179	
8	Naim Bucio	Mexico	1:33.175	q	1:38.249	
9	Sofía Rojas	Costa Rica	1:35.423		Did not advance	
10	Gabriella Pasquarella	United States	1:37.017		Did not advance	
11	Amanda Vilches	Cuba	1:37.145		Did not advance	
12	Lizza Galeano	Paraguay	1:43.963		Did not advance	

=== Men's 5000 metres points race ===
Final – August 20

Rank	Athlete	Nation	Time	Notes
1st place, gold medalist(s)	Nicolás García	Ecuador	24	
2nd place, silver medalist(s)	Sebastián Flórez	Colombia	17	
3rd place, bronze medalist(s)	Gabriel Reyes	Chile	10	
4	Jokin Ziaurriz	Argentina	8	
5	Ryan Dawson	United States	5	
6	Allan López	Guatemala	2	
7	Alejandro Castañeda	Mexico	2	
	Ian Matus	Costa Rica	DNF	
	Sergio Sena	Dominican Republic	DNF	
	Dayan Millan	Cuba	DNF	

=== Women's 5000 metres points race ===
Final – August 20

Rank	Athlete	Nation	Time	Notes
1st place, gold medalist(s)	Yicel Giraldo	Colombia	24	
2nd place, silver medalist(s)	Camila Carreño	Chile	23	
3rd place, bronze medalist(s)	Daniela Bustamante	Venezuela	11	
4	Fernanda Moncada	Ecuador	9	
5	Naiara Sagasti	Argentina	4	
	Luisa Sandoval	Guatemala	DNF	
	Sofía Rojas	Costa Rica	DNF	
	Brianda Carmona	Mexico	DNF	
	Gabriella Pasquarella	United States	DNF	
	Amanda Vilches	Cuba	DNF	
	Ashley Caballero	El Salvador	DNF	
