= Dominican Republic at the 2025 Junior Pan American Games =

- IOC code: DOM
- NOC: Dominican Republic Olympic Committee
- Website: colimdo.org

in Asunción, Paraguay 9 August 2025 – 23 August 2025
- Competitors: 90
- Flag bearers: Elizabeth Jiménez; José Miguel Brache
- Officials: Miguel Hernández, chef de mission
- Medals Ranked 18th: Gold 1 Silver 2 Bronze 5 Total 8

Junior Pan American Games appearances (overview)
- 2021; 2025

Dominican Republic competed in the 2025 Junior Pan American Games in Asunción, Paraguay from 9 to 23 August 2025.

The flag bearers at the opening ceremony were swimmer Elizabeth Jiménez and judoka José Miguel Brache.

== Medalists ==
The following Dominican Republic competitors won medals at the games. In the by discipline sections below, medalists' names are bolded.

Medal	Name	Sport	Event	Date
Gold	Liranyi Alonso	Athletics	200 m	August 21
Silver	José Miguel Brache	Judo	Men's +100 kg	August 12
Silver	Liranyi Alonso	Athletics	100 m	August 19
Bronze	Dominican Republic women's national under-23 volleyball team: Edily Soler; Ambar Hernández; Katielle Alonzo; Alondra Tapia; Kirssy Fernández; Selanny Puente; Ailyn Liberato; Vallery Martínez; Crismeily Paniagua; Dilenny Maleno; Florangel Terrero	Volleyball	Women's tournament	August 15
Bronze	Ramón Vila	Table tennis	Singles	August 18
Bronze	Yorkis Carvajal	Wrestling	Men's Greco-Roman 60 kg	August 20
Bronze	Víctor Pérez	Wrestling	Freestyle 125 kg	August 22
Bronze	Perqui Francis	Weightlifting	Women's +77 kg	August 23

== Archery ==
Men

Athlete	Event	Ranking Round		Round of 32	Round of 16	Quarterfinals	Semifinals	Final / BM	Rank
Athlete	Event	Score	Seed	Opposition Score	Opposition Score	Opposition Score	Opposition Score	Opposition Score	Rank
Richard Abramson	Individual recurve	534	23	Silva (ARG); **L** 1–7	Did not advance				
Emmanuel Núñez	Individual compound	651	11	—N/a	Camacho (VEN); **L** 136-142	Did not advance			

Women

Athlete	Event	Ranking Round		Round of 32	Round of 16	Quarterfinals	Semifinals	Final / BM	Rank
Athlete	Event	Score	Seed	Opposition Score	Opposition Score	Opposition Score	Opposition Score	Opposition Score	Rank
Grace Díaz	Individual recurve	397	22	Zavala (PER); **L** 0–6	Did not advance				

Mixed

Athlete	Event	Ranking Round		Round of 16	Quarterfinals	Semifinals	Final / BM	Rank
Athlete	Event	Score	Seed	Opposition Score	Opposition Score	Opposition Score	Opposition Score	Rank
Richard Abramson; Grace Díaz	Team recurve	931	16	Mexico; **L** 0–6	Did not advance			

== Athletics ==
Key

- Note–Ranks given for track events are within the athlete's heat only
- **Q** = Qualified for the next round
- **q** = Qualified for the next round as a fastest loser
- **JPR** = Junior Pan American Games Record
- Bye = Athlete not required to compete in round

Men

Track & road events

Athlete	Event	Semifinal		Final	
Athlete	Event	Result	Rank	Result	Rank
Yeral Núñez	400 m hurdles	49.75	3 **Q**	50.13	4

Women

Track & road events

Athlete	Event	Semifinal		Final	
Athlete	Event	Result	Rank	Result	Rank
**Liranyi Alonso**	100 m	11.08 **JPR**	1 **Q**	11.40	2nd place, silver medalist(s)
**Liranyi Alonso**	200 m	23.33	1 **Q**	22.69 **JPR**	1st place, gold medalist(s)
Micheiry Brito	400 m hurdles	—N/a		1:00.79	6

== Basketball ==
=== 3x3 ===
Summary

Team	Event	Preliminary round			Quarterfinal	Semifinal	Final / BM / Pl.	
Team	Event	Opposition Result	Opposition Result	Rank	Opposition Result	Opposition Result	Opposition Result	Rank
Dominican Republic men's	Men's tournament	Argentina; **L** 10–21	El Salvador; **W** 21–7	2 **Q**	Paraguay; **L** 14–16	Chile; **L** 16–18	Bronze Medal Final; Ecuador; **L** 16–21	4

==== Men's tournament ====
Roster

- 6 Ángel Puello
- 7 Juan Alejandro de los Santos (c)
- 23 Dolfy Arias
- 24 Rey Abad

== Canoeing ==
=== Sprint ===
Women

Athlete	Event	Heat		Semifinal		Final	
Athlete	Event	Time	Rank	Time	Rank	Time	Rank
Cristal Díaz	K-1 200 m	1:05.98	7 SFNL	1:06.06	8	Did not advance	
Cristal Díaz	K-1 500 m	2:40.34	7 SFNL	2:44.40	8	Did not advance	

== Cycling ==
=== BMX ===
Racing

Athlete	Event	Ranking round		Quarterfinal		Semifinal		Final	
Athlete	Event	Time	Rank	Points	Rank	Points	Rank	Time	Rank
Jeremy Marchena	Men's	36.184	14 **Q**	13	11 **Q**	12	17	Did not advance	

=== Road ===
Women

Athlete	Event	Time	Rank
Flor Espiritusanto	Road race	2:52:02	19
Melsey Pérez	Road race	2:52:02	21
Flor Espiritusanto	Time trial	43:36.35	18

=== Mountain biking ===
Athlete	Event	Time	Rank
Ransi de los Santos	Men's cross-country	-3LAP	
Feline Mendoza	Women's cross-country	-3LAP	

== Diving ==
Women

Athlete	Event	Preliminary		Final	
Athlete	Event	Score	Rank	Score	Rank
Piera Rufino	1 m springboard	158.55	12 **Q**	96.30	12
Piera Rufino	3 m springboard	117.90	15	Did not advance	
Victoria Garza	10 m platform	287.70	4 **Q**	290.90	6
Piera Rufino; Victoria Garza	3 m synchronized springboard	—N/a		197.16	5

== Judo ==
Men

Athlete	Event	Round of 16	Quarterfinals	Semifinals	Repechage	Final / BM	
Athlete	Event	Opposition Result	Opposition Result	Opposition Result	Opposition Result	Opposition Result	Rank
**José Miguel Brache**	+100 kg	—N/a	Delgado (CUB); **W** 100s1–000s3	Messe (CAN); **W** 100s1–000s2	Bye	Coelho (BRA); **L** 000s3–102	2nd place, silver medalist(s)

Women

Athlete	Event	Round of 16	Quarterfinals	Semifinals	Repechage	Final / BM	
Athlete	Event	Opposition Result	Opposition Result	Opposition Result	Opposition Result	Opposition Result	Rank
Yarelis Lucas	−48 kg	Bye	Vásquez (ECU); **L** 000s1–102	Did not advance	Manibog (USA); **W** 001s2–000s2	Bronze medal final Manibog (USA); **L** 000s2–100	5
Victoria Ramírez	−70 kg	Bye	Oliveira (BRA); **L** 000s3–100s1	Did not advance	Duarte (PAR); **W** 100-000	Bronze medal final Espina (VEN); **L** 000–100	5
Yhoseli Matos	−78 kg	—N/a	Schultz (USA); **L** 001–100	Did not advance	Sánchez (MEX); **W** 100s1-000	Bronze medal final González (CUB); **L** 000s3–110	5
Marielin Gómez	+78 kg	—N/a	Soares (BRA); **W** 100s2-000s3	Casas (CHI); **L** 000s3–100s1	Bye	Bronze medal final Ferguson (USA); **L** 000s2–001s1	5

== Fencing ==
Brazil qualified a full team of six fencers (three men and three women) at the 2025 Pan American Cadets and Juniors Fencing Championships in Asunción, Paraguay. The team was officially named on March 17, 2025.

Men

Athlete	Event	Pool Round		Round of 16	Quarterfinals	Semifinals	Final	
Athlete	Event	Victories	Seed	Opposition Score	Opposition Score	Opposition Score	Opposition Score	Rank
Adrian Álvarez	Individual foil	1**V**–4**D**	4 **Q**	Hooshi (USA); **L** 5–15	Did not advance			

Women

Athlete	Event	Pool Round		Round of 16	Quarterfinals	Semifinals	Final	
Athlete	Event	Victories	Seed	Opposition Score	Opposition Score	Opposition Score	Opposition Score	Rank
Mía González	Individual sabre	0**V**–5**D**	5 **Q**	Triana (COL); **L** 1–15	Did not advance			

== Golf ==
Athlete	Event	Round 1	Round 2	Round 3	Total		
Athlete	Event	Score	Score	Score	Score	Par	Rank
Rodrigo Huerta	Men's individual	81	72	86	239	+23	18
Sebastian Ramos	Men's individual	80	76	80	236	+20	14

== Gymnastics ==
=== Artistic ===
Women

Team & Individual Qualification

Athlete	Event	Final					
Athlete	Event	Apparatus				Total	Rank
Athlete	Event	F	BB	V	UB	Total	Rank
Mía Lugo	Team	11.650	7.850	9.900	10.050	—N/a	
Analis Pérez	Team	12.100	7.600	11.700 **R3**	10.950	—N/a	
Abby Tejeda	Team	10.800	7.650	4.050	9.450	—N/a	
**Total**	Team	34.550	23.100	25.650	30.40	113.750	11

Qualification Legend: Q = Qualified to apparatus final

Individual Finals

Athlete	Event	Apparatus				Total	
Athlete	Event	F	BB	V	UB	Score	Rank
Mía Lugo	All-around	11.650	7.850	9.900	10.050	39.450	40
Analis Pérez	All-around	12.100	7.600	11.700	10.950	42.350	30
Abby Tejeda	All-around	10.800	7.650	4.050	9.450	31.950	49

== Karate ==
Kumite

Men

Athlete	Event	Round robin				Semifinal	Final	
Athlete	Event	Opposition Result	Opposition Result	Opposition Result	Rank	Opposition Result	Opposition Result	Rank
Keanu Féliz	−75 kg	Yoshii (MEX); **L** 1–0	Salesky (ARG); **W** 2–2	Rinck (PAR); **L** 2–4	4	Did not advance		7

== Open water swimming ==
Brazil qualified a full team of four open water swimmers (two men and two women) through the 2025 Pan American Aquatics Championships in Medellín, Colombia.

Athlete	Event	Final	
Athlete	Event	Time	Rank
Juan Diego Núñez	Men's 10 km	2:02:40.5	12
Christina Durán	Women's 10 km	2:18:06.5	19
Isabella Hernández	Women's 10 km	2:22:45.4	20

== Roller sports ==
=== Speed ===
Men

Athlete	Event	Qualification		Semifinal		Final	
Athlete	Event	Time	Rank	Time	Rank	Time	Rank
Sergio Sena	1000 m sprint	1:30.380	13	—N/a		Did not advance	
Sergio Sena	5000 m points race	DNF		Did not advance			
Sergio Sena	10,000 m elimination	—N/a					12
José Luis Santos	200 m time trial	—N/a				19.878	10
José Luis Santos	500 m + distance	47.078	10	Did not advance			

=== Skateboarding ===
Street

Athlete	Event	Qualification		Final	
Athlete	Event	Score	Rank	Score	Rank
Víctor Melo	Men's	51.38	15	Did not advance	
Ambar Silverio	Women's	13.77	15	Did not advance	

== Shooting ==
Women

Shotgun

Athlete	Event	Qualification		Final	
Athlete	Event	Points	Rank	Points	Rank
Josabet Hazoury	Trap	87	4 **Q**	18	5

== Swimming ==
Men

Athlete	Event	Heat		Final	
Athlete	Event	Time	Rank	Time	Rank
Javier Núñez	50 m freestyle	23.27	14 **q**	23.10	=12
Cristian Ramos	50 m freestyle	23.41	15 **q**	23.05	9
Javier Núñez	100 m freestyle	50.87	12 **q**	51.13	13
Anthony Piñeiro	100 m freestyle	51.36	16 **q**	Did not advance	
Mauricio Arias	200 m freestyle	1:54.67	14 **q**	1:58.40	16
Mauricio Arias	400 m freestyle	4:07.70	11 **q**	4:08.29	12
Mauricio Arias	100 m backstroke	1:02.33	23	Did not advance	
Anthony Piñeiro	100 m backstroke	57.11	9 **q**	Did not advance	
Anthony Piñeiro	200 m backstroke	2:06.47	9 **Q**	2:05.20	9
Javier Núñez	100 m butterfly	55.82	16 **q**	56.77	16
Mauricio Arias; Cristian Ramos; Javier Núñez; Anthony Piñeiro	4 × 100 m freestyle relay	3:27.58	8 **Q**	3:27.04	8
Anthony Piñeiro; Pablo Solano; Cristian Ramos; Javier Núñez	4 × 100 m medley relay	3:43.58	1 **Q**	DSQ	

Women

Athlete	Event	Heat		Final	
Athlete	Event	Time	Rank	Time	Rank
Darielys Ortíz	50 m freestyle	27.34	17	Did not advance	
Darielys Ortíz	100 m freestyle	59.62	18	Did not advance	
Darielys Ortíz	100 m butterfly	1:05.65	19	Did not advance	
Elizabeth Jiménez	100 m backstroke	1:03.87	8 **Q**	1:03.74	8
Elizabeth Jiménez	200 m individual medley	2:23.53	9 **q**	2:23.35	11

Mixed

Athlete	Event	Heat		Final	
Athlete	Event	Time	Rank	Time	Rank
Darielys Ortíz; Javier Núñez; Anthony Piñeiro; Elizabeth Jiménez	4 × 100 m freestyle relay	3:43.20	10 R	Did not advance	
Cristian Ramos; Darielys Ortíz; Javier Núñez; Pablo Solano; Elizabeth Jiménez	4 × 100 m medley relay	4:07.59	11	Did not advance	

== Table tennis ==
Men

Athlete	Event	Group stage				Round of 32	Round of 16	Quarterfinal	Semifinal	Final / BM	
Athlete	Event	Opposition Result	Opposition Result	Opposition Result	Rank	Opposition Result	Opposition Result	Opposition Result	Opposition Result	Opposition Result	Rank
Rafael Cabrera	Singles	—N/a				Callaba (ARG); **L** 2–4	Did not advance				
Ramón Vila	Singles	—N/a				Castaño (COL); **W** 4–0	Rios (PUR); **W** 4–2	Xie (USA); **W** 4–1	Iizuka (BRA); **L** 3–4	Did not advance	3rd place, bronze medalist(s)
Ramón Vila; Rafael Cabrera	Doubles	—N/a					Amaya / Molina (ESA); **W** 3–0	Doti / Iizuka (BRA); **L** 2–3	Did not advance		5
Ramón Vila; Rafael Cabrera	Team	Doti / Iizuka (BRA); **L** 0–3	Amaya / Molina (ESA); **W** 3–0	Callaba / Alin (ARG); **L** 1–3	3	—N/a		Did not advance			

Women

Athlete	Event	Group stage				Round of 32	Round of 16	Quarterfinal	Semifinal	Final / BM	
Athlete	Event	Opposition Result	Opposition Result	Opposition Result	Rank	Opposition Result	Opposition Result	Opposition Result	Opposition Result	Opposition Result	Rank
Ariana Estrella	Singles	—N/a				Fraser (TTO); **L** 2-4	Did not advance				
Dafne Sosa	Singles	—N/a				Orellana (ECU); **L** 0–4	Did not advance				
Arianna Estrella; Dafne Sosa	Doubles	—N/a					Mendoza / Aquije (PER); **W** 3–2	Mendonça / Senaga (BRA); **L** 1-3	Did not advance		
Arianna Estrella; Dafne Sosa	Team	Mendoza / Aquije (PER); **L** 1–3	Cux / Corado (GUA); **L** 0–3	León / Meléndez (PUR); **L** 0–3	4	—N/a		Did not advance			

Mixed

Athlete	Event	Round of 32	Round of 16	Quarterfinal	Semifinal	Final / BM	
Athlete	Event	Opposition Result	Opposition Result	Opposition Result	Opposition Result	Opposition Result	Rank
Rafael Cabrera; Dafne Sosa	Doubles	Pastore / Arzamendia (PAR); **W** 3–1	Rios / Ferrer (VEN); **L** 1–3	Did not advance			9
Ramón Vila; Arianna Estrella	Doubles	Molina / Castillo (ESA); **W** 3–1	Bedoya / Isaza (COL); **W** 3–2	Doti / Senaga (BRA); **L** 1–3	Did not advance		5

== Taekwondo ==
Kyorugi

Men

Athlete	Event	Quarterfinals	Semifinals	Final / BM	
Athlete	Event	Opposition Result	Opposition Result	Opposition Result	Rank
Pablo Féliz	+80 kg	Silva (COL); **L** 0–2	Did not advance	Bronze medal final Ramírez (MEX); **L** 0–2	5

== Triathlon ==
Individual

Athlete	Event	Swim (1.5 km)	Trans 1	Bike (40 km)	Trans 2	Run (10 km)	Total	Rank
Víctor Féliz	Men's	11:39	12:33	43:56	44:18	52:47	1:02:00	25

== Volleyball ==
=== Beach ===
Athlete	Event	Group stage				Round of 16	Quarterfinal	Semifinal	Final / BM	
Athlete	Event	Opposition Result	Opposition Result	Opposition Result	Rank	Opposition Result	Opposition Result	Opposition Result	Opposition Result	Rank
Rolvin Maldonado; Ramón de Jesús	Men's tournament	Isac / Jonathan (BRA); **L** 0–2 (13-21, 15-21)	Araya / Varela (CRC); **L** 0–2 (9-21, 18-21)	Valverde / Duran (BOL); **W** 2–0 (21-18, 21-11)	3	classification 9th-12th Cañiza / Vargas (PAR); **W** 2–1 (19-21, 21-13, 15-9)	classification 9th-10th Araya / Varela (CRC); **L** 0–2 (15-21, 15-21)	Did not advance		10
Yari Cleto; Crismil Paniagua	Women's tournament	Castillo / Romero (PER); **L** 1–2 (15-21, 24-22, 10-15)	Garrido / Drik (CUB); **L** 1–2 (21-16, 17-21, 14-16)	Chacón / Galindo (BOL); **L** 0–2 (16-21, 11-21)	4	classification 13th-16th Arévalo / Aguilar (GUA); **W** 2–0 (21-6, 21-13)	classification 13th-14th Silva / Brenes (NCA); **L** 1–2 (21-18, 14-21, 9-15)	Did not advance		14

=== Indoor ===
Dominican Republic qualified a men's and women's team of 12 athletes each (23 athletes in total). The women's team won the Bronze medal.

Summary

Team	Event	Group stage				Quarterfinal	Semifinal	Final / BM / Pl.	
Team	Event	Opposition Result	Opposition Result	Opposition Result	Rank	Opposition Result	Opposition Result	Opposition Result	Rank
Dominican Republic men's	Men's tournament	Brazil; **L** 0–3	Cuba; **L** 0–3	Argentina; **L** 1–3	4	—N/a	classification 5th-8th Guatemala; **W** 3–0	classification 5th-6th Colombia; **W** 3–2	5
**Dominican Republic women's**	Women's tournament	Chile; **W** 3–0	Mexico; **L** 1–3	Brazil; **L** 1–3	3 **Q**	Cuba; **W** 3–0	Brazil; **L** 0–3	Argentina; **W** 3–1	3rd place, bronze medalist(s)

== Water skiing ==
Athlete	Event	Preliminary		Final	
Athlete	Event	Score	Rank	Total	Rank
Andrea Pigozzi	Slalom	5.00/58/11.25	5 **Q**	2.00/58/11.25	6
Andrea Pigozzi	Jumps	43.7	6 **Q**	48.7	5
Andrea Pigozzi	Tricks	200	15	Did not advance	
Andrea Pigozzi	Overall	—N/a		1,494.33	9
Paolo Pigozzi	Slalom	4.50/58/12.00	10	Did not advance	
Paolo Pigozzi	Jumps	42.8	7	Did not advance	
Paolo Pigozzi	Tricks	3310	10	Did not advance	
Paolo Pigozzi	Overall	—N/a		1,599.73	8

== Weightlifting ==
Men

Athlete	Event	Snatch		Clean & Jerk		Total	Rank
Athlete	Event	Result	Rank	Result	Rank	Total	Rank
Enmanuel Pascual	–71 kg	84	8	113	8	197	8
Luis Manuel Florentino	+98 kg	122	5	150	6	272	5

Women

Athlete	Event	Snatch		Clean & Jerk		Total	Rank
Athlete	Event	Result	Rank	Result	Rank	Total	Rank
Jhancelis Santana	–53 kg	65	6	86	5	151	6
**Perqui Francis**	+77 kg	97	3	123	3	220	3rd place, bronze medalist(s)

== Wrestling ==
Key:

- VT (ranking points: 5–0 or 0–5) – Victory by fall.
- VB (ranking points: 5–0 or 0–5) – Victory by injury (VF for forfeit, VA for withdrawal or disqualification)
- PP (ranking points: 3–1 or 1–3) – Decision by points – the loser with technical points.
- PO (ranking points: 3–0 or 0–3) – Decision by points – the loser without technical points.
- ST (ranking points: 4–0 or 0–4) – Great superiority – the loser without technical points and a margin of victory of at least 8 (Greco-Roman) or 10 (freestyle) points.
- SP (ranking points: 4–1 or 1–4) – Technical superiority – the loser with technical points and a margin of victory of at least 8 (Greco-Roman) or 10 (freestyle) points.

Men

Athlete	Event	Group round				Quarterfinal	Semifinal	Final / BM	
Athlete	Event	Opposition Result	Opposition Result	Opposition Result	Rank	Opposition Result	Opposition Result	Opposition Result	Rank
Juan Valerio	Freestyle 57 kg	Falcón (VEN); **L** 0–5^{PP}	Farmer (USA); **L** 2–12^{SP}	Samano (PUR); **L** 1–11^{SP}	4	Did not advance			6
Juan Gómez	Freestyle 74 kg	Peake (PUR); **L** 1–8^{VT}	—N/a	—N/a	Did not advance				9
Juan Andrés	Freestyle 97 kg	Imbernon (BRA); **W** 8–6^{PP}	Dineen (USA); **L** 0–10^{SP}	—N/a	2	—N/a	Lee (CUB); **L** 2–10^{VT}	Bronze medal final Iturriza (MEX); **L** 2–15^{SP}	4
Víctor Pérez	Freestyle 125 kg	—N/a				Chavez (MEX); **W** 6–4^{PP}	Silva (MEX); **L** 0–10^{SP}	Bronze medal final Gómez (PAR); **W** 8–0^{VT}	3rd place, bronze medalist(s)
Yorkis Carvajal	Greco-Roman 60 kg	—N/a				Segura (MEX); **L** 1–3^{PP}	Did not advance	Sánchez (PER); **W** 9–5^{PP}	3rd place, bronze medalist(s)
Starlin Laguerre	Greco-Roman 77 kg	—N/a				Hosseini (PAR); **W** 8–0^{SP}	Parada (VEN); **L** 0–4^{PP}	Gómez (CUB); **L** 1–5^{PP}	5
Luis Figuereo	Greco-Roman 87 kg	—N/a				Brown (PAN); **L** 3–7^{VB}	Did not advance		7
Elvis Balvuena	Greco-Roman 97 kg	—N/a				Aleixo (BRA); **L** 2–5^{PP}	Did not advance		7
José Núñez	Greco-Roman 130 kg	Talavera (VEN); **L** 1–2^{PP}	Williams (BAR); **W** 6–0^{VT}	—N/a	2	—N/a	Attao (USA); **L** 0–9^{SP}	Bronze medal final Barros (BRA); **L** 2–6^{VT}	4
