= Tennis at the 2025 Junior Pan American Games =

Tennis at the 2025 Junior American Games
- Venue: Rakiura Resort
- Start date: August 11, 2025
- End date: August 16, 2025
- No. of events: 5
- Competitors: 64

The tennis events at the 2025 Junior Pan American Games were held at the Rakiura Resort, located in the Greater Asuncion area. The events were contested between August 11 and 16, 2025.

Five events were contested, two men, two women, and one mixed. The winner of each event qualified for the 2027 Pan American Games in Lima, Peru.

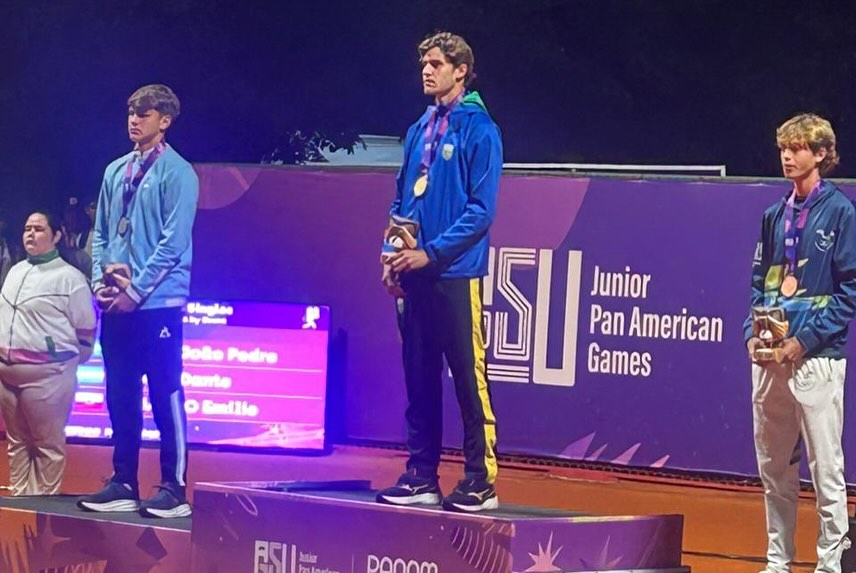
Men's singles podium

== Qualification ==
A total of 64 athletes qualified for the events (32 men and 32 women). Qualification was mainly based on the ITF Junior Rankings, which gave 29 from the 32 spots per gender. Three additional athletes per gender were wild cards.

== Medal summary ==
=== Medal table ===
* Host nation (Paraguay)

Rank	Nation	Gold	Silver	Bronze	Total
1	Argentina	2	2	1	5
2	Colombia	2	0	0	2
3	Brazil	1	0	1	2
4	Ecuador	0	1	1	2
5	Mexico	0	1	0	1
5	Puerto Rico	0	1	0	1
7	Paraguay*	0	0	1	1
7	Peru	0	0	1	1
Totals (8 entries)		5	5	5	15

=== Medalists ===
Event	Gold	Silver	Bronze
Men's singles	João Pedro Didoni Bonini; Brazil	Dante Pagani; Argentina	Emilio Camacho; Ecuador
Men's doubles	Argentina; Dante Pagani; Ian Vertberger	Ecuador; Emilio Camacho; Francisco José Castro	Brazil; Gustavo Albieri; Victor Winheski
Women's singles	Valentina Mediorreal; Colombia	Sol Larraya Guidi; Argentina	Candela Vázquez; Argentina
Women's doubles	Argentina; Sol Larraya Guidi; Candela Vázquez	Mexico; Marianne Ángel; Hanne Estrada	Peru; Francesca Maguiña; Yleymi Muelle
Mixed doubles	Colombia; Juan Bolívar; Valentina Mediorreal	Puerto Rico; Yannik Álvarez; Aurora Lugo	Paraguay; Alex Núñez; Catalina Delmas

== Results ==
=== Men's singles ===
Date: August 11–16

Round of 32
J Bonini (BRA)	2
L Flores (MEX)	0
J Bolívar (COL)	2
R Ramos (PER)	1
A Veliz (ECU)	1
F Vazquez (URU)	2
Z Byng (TTO)	0
A Nuñez (PAR)	2
Y Alvarez (PUR)	2
M Schtulmann (MEX)	0
F Castro (ECU)	2
I Vertberger (ARG)	0
B Pérez (CHI)	2
Y Alfred (ISV)	0
C Narvaez (PAR)	0
S Lora (BOL)	2
A Frutos (PAR)	2
T Menzel (CHI)	0
E Camacho (ECU)	2
A Rendón (ESA)	0
N Baena (PER)	2
L Velasco (COL)	0
L Suárez (BOL)	0
V Winheski (BRA)	2
G Albieri (BRA)	2
I de Armas (VEN)	1
D Alcala (MEX)	0
A Castellanos (COL)	2
R de Andreis (VEN)	2
A Rubini (PER)	0
O Solís (BOL)	0
D Pagani (ARG)	2

Round of 16
J Bonini (BRA)	2
J Bolívar (COL)	1
F Vazquez (URU)	1
A Nuñez (PAR)	2
Y Alvarez (PUR)	2
F Castro (ECU)	0
B Pérez (CHI)	1
S Lora (BOL)	2
A Frutos (PAR)	0
E Camacho (ECU)	2
N Baena (PER)	2
V Winheski (BRA)	0
G Albieri (BRA)	2
A Castellanos (COL)	0
R de Andreis (VEN)	0
D Pagani (ARG)	2

Quarterfinals
J Bonini (BRA)	2
A Nuñez (PAR)	1
Y Alvarez (PUR)	2
S Lora (BOL)	0
E Camacho (ECU)	2
N Baena (PER)	1
G Albieri (BRA)	0
D Pagani (ARG)	2

Semifinals
J Bonini (BRA)	2
Y Alvarez (PUR)	0
E Camacho (ECU)	1
D Pagani (ARG)	2

Final
J Bonini (BRA)	2
D Pagani (ARG)	1
Bronze medal
Y Alvarez (PUR)	0
E Camacho (ECU)	2

=== Women's singles ===
Date: August 11–16

Round of 32
S Larraya (ARG)	2
A Soto (CHI)	0
C Balseiro (GUA)	0
N Tourinho (BRA)	2
M Higuita (COL)	2
J Soldo (URU)	0
J Marcos (PAR)	0
F Maguiña (PER)	2
P Rivoli (BRA)	2
M Sánchez (COL)	0
C Rodero (CHI)	2
V Sumoya (BOL)	0
V Vargas (ECU)	2
A Cárdenas (MEX)	1
V López (PAR)	1
S Meabe (ARG)	2
V Mediorreal (COL)	2
H Estrada (MEX)	0
S Poma (ESA)	0
A Lugo (PUR)	2
Y Muelle (PER)	2
A Cruz (BRA)	0
S Balderrama (VEN)	1
A James (JAM)	2
G Pimentel (PER)	2
C Zouein (CHI)	0
M Moscoso (ECU)	0
C Delmas (PAR)	2
L Gallegos (CRC)	0
M Angel (MEX)	2
D Velasco (BOL)	0
C Vázquez (ARG)	2

Round of 16
S Larraya (ARG)	2
N Tourinho (BRA)	0
M Higuita (COL)	1
F Maguiña (PER)	2
P Rivoli (BRA)	1
C Rodero (CHI)	2
V Vargas (ECU)	0
S Meabe (ARG)	2
V Mediorreal (COL)	2
A Lugo (PUR)	0
Y Muelle (PER)	1
A James (JAM)	2
G Pimentel (PER)	0
C Delmas (PAR)	2
M Angel (MEX)	0
C Vázquez (ARG)	2

Quarterfinals
S Larraya (ARG)	2
F Maguiña (PER)	1
C Rodero (CHI)	2
S Meabe (ARG)	0
V Mediorreal (COL)	2
A James (JAM)	1
C Delmas (PAR)	0
C Vázquez (ARG)	2

Semifinals
S Larraya (ARG)	2
C Rodero (CHI)	1
V Mediorreal (COL)	2
C Vázquez (ARG)	0

Final
S Larraya (ARG)	0
V Mediorreal (COL)	2
Bronze medal
C Rodero (CHI)	0
C Vázquez (ARG)	2

=== Men's doubles ===
Date: August 11–15

Round of 16
I de Armas (VEN); R de Andreis (VEN)	2
R Ramos (PER); A Rubini (PER)	0
L Flores (MEX); M Schtulmann (MEX)	2
A Castellanos (COL); L Velasco (COL)	1
S Lora (BOL); L Suárez (BOL)	1
T Menzel (CHI); B Pérez (CHI)	2

Quarterfinals
V Winheski (BRA); G Albieri (BRA)	2
I de Armas (VEN); R de Andreis (VEN)	0
F Castro (ECU); E Camacho (ECU)	2
A Rendón (ESA); G Mejía (ESA)	0
L Flores (MEX); M Schtulmann (MEX)	2
A Frutos (PAR); C Narvaez (PAR)	0
T Menzel (CHI); B Pérez (CHI)	0
I Vertberger (ARG); D Pagani (ARG)	2

Semifinals
V Winheski (BRA); G Albieri (BRA)	1
F Castro (ECU); E Camacho (ECU)	2
L Flores (MEX); M Schtulmann (MEX)	0
I Vertberger (ARG); D Pagani (ARG)	2

Final
F Castro (ECU); E Camacho (ECU)	0
I Vertberger (ARG); D Pagani (ARG)	2
Bronze medal
V Winheski (BRA); G Albieri (BRA)	2
L Flores (MEX); M Schtulmann (MEX)	0

=== Women's doubles ===
Date: August 11–15

Round of 16
A Soto (CHI); C Rodero (CHI)	2
J Marcos (PAR); V López (PAR)	0
V Sumoya (BOL); D Velasco (BOL)	2
P Esperanza (ESA); S Poma (ESA)	0

Quarterfinals
C Vázquez (ARG); S Larraya (ARG)	2
A Soto (CHI); C Rodero (CHI)	0
Y Muelle (PER); F Maguiña (PER)	2
V Vargas (ECU); M Moscoso (ECU)	0
M Higuita (COL); M Sánchez (COL)	2
P Rivoli (BRA); A Cruz (BRA)	1
V Sumoya (BOL); D Velasco (BOL)	1
M Angel (MEX); H Estrada (MEX)	2

Semifinals
C Vázquez (ARG); S Larraya (ARG)	2
Y Muelle (PER); F Maguiña (PER)	0
M Higuita (COL); M Sánchez (COL)	0
M Angel (MEX); H Estrada (MEX)	2

Final
C Vázquez (ARG); S Larraya (ARG)	2
M Angel (MEX); H Estrada (MEX)	1
Bronze medal
Y Muelle (PER); F Maguiña (PER)	2
M Higuita (COL); M Sánchez (COL)	0

=== Mixed doubles ===
Date: August 12–16

Round of 16
N Tourinho (BRA); G Albieri (BRA)	2
D Velasco (BOL); O Solís (BOL)	0
N Baena (PER); F Maguiña (PER)	0
Y Alvarez (PUR); A Lugo (PUR)	2
C Zouein (CHI); T Menzel (CHI)	2
S Poma (ESA); A Rendón (ESA)	0
S Balderrama (VEN); I de Armas (VEN)	2
A Veliz (ECU); V Vargas (ECU)	0
M Pérez (CUB); Y Sánchez (CUB)	0
A Nuñez (PAR); C Delmas (PAR)	2

Quarterfinals
D Pagani (ARG); S Meabe (ARG)	2
N Tourinho (BRA); G Albieri (BRA)	0
Y Alvarez (PUR); A Lugo (PUR)	2
C Zouein (CHI); T Menzel (CHI)	0
S Balderrama (VEN); I de Armas (VEN)	1
A Nuñez (PAR); C Delmas (PAR)	2
A Cárdenas (MEX); D Alcala (MEX)	0
J Bolívar (COL); V Mediorreal (COL)	2

Semifinals
D Pagani (ARG); S Meabe (ARG)	0
Y Alvarez (PUR); A Lugo (PUR)	2
A Nuñez (PAR); C Delmas (PAR)	0
J Bolívar (COL); V Mediorreal (COL)	2

Final
Y Alvarez (PUR); A Lugo (PUR)	0
J Bolívar (COL); V Mediorreal (COL)	2
Bronze medal
D Pagani (ARG); S Meabe (ARG)	0
A Nuñez (PAR); C Delmas (PAR)	2
