= Squash at the 2025 Junior Pan American Games =

Squash at the 2025 Junior American Games
- Venue: National Squash Centre
- Start date: August 11, 2025
- End date: August 16, 2025
- No. of events: 7
- Competitors: 60

The squash events at the 2025 Junior Pan American Games were held at the National Squash Centre, located in the Secretaría Nacional de Deportes Complex in Asunción. The events were contested between August 11 and 16, 2025.

Seven events were contested, three for men, three for women and one mixed. The winner of each event qualified for the 2027 Pan American Games in Lima, Peru.

== Qualification ==
A total of 60 athletes qualified for the events (30 men and 30 women). Qualification was based on the results from the 2024 U23 Squash Pan American Championship.

== Medal summary ==
=== Medal table ===
* Host nation (Paraguay)

Rank	Nation	Gold	Silver	Bronze	Total
1	Colombia	3	0	3	6
2	Mexico	2	1	3	6
3	Paraguay*	1	0	2	3
4	Guatemala	1	0	0	1
5	Argentina	0	3	1	4
6	Ecuador	0	1	4	5
7	Brazil	0	1	1	2
8	Peru	0	1	0	1
Totals (8 entries)		7	7	14	28

=== Medalists ===
==== Men ====
Event	Gold	Silver	Bronze
Singles	Juan José Torres; Colombia	Segundo Portabales; Argentina	Juan Irisarri; Colombia
Singles	Juan José Torres; Colombia	Segundo Portabales; Argentina	Javier Romo; Ecuador
Doubles	Colombia; Juan Irisarri; Juan José Torres	Argentina; Francisco Alfonso; Santiago Portabales	Mexico; Gilberto Aceves; Santiago Medina
Doubles	Colombia; Juan Irisarri; Juan José Torres	Argentina; Francisco Alfonso; Santiago Portabales	Brazil; João Carlos Santos; Murilo Penteado
Team	Colombia; Juan José Torres; Juan Irisarri; José Santamaría	Argentina; Segundo Portabales; Francisco Alfonso; Santiago Portabales	Ecuador; Javier Romo; Martín Falconí; Esteban Davalos
Team	Colombia; Juan José Torres; Juan Irisarri; José Santamaría	Argentina; Segundo Portabales; Francisco Alfonso; Santiago Portabales	Mexico; Santiago Medina; Gilberto Aceves; Wally Ávila

==== Women ====
Event	Gold	Silver	Bronze
Singles	Fiorella Gatti; Paraguay	Laura Silva; Brazil	Mariana Narvaez; Mexico
Singles	Fiorella Gatti; Paraguay	Laura Silva; Brazil	María Falconí; Ecuador
Doubles	Guatemala; Darlyn Sandoval; Tabita Gaitán	Mexico; Ana Botello; Paola Franco	Colombia; Ana Quijano; Camila Sabogal
Doubles	Guatemala; Darlyn Sandoval; Tabita Gaitán	Mexico; Ana Botello; Paola Franco	Ecuador; Rafaela García; María Falconí
Team	Mexico; Ana Botello; Paola Franco; Mariana Narvaez	Ecuador; Rafaela García; María Falconí; Ariana Alava	Paraguay; Fiorella Gatti; Nicole Krauch; Giuliana Cino
Team	Mexico; Ana Botello; Paola Franco; Mariana Narvaez	Ecuador; Rafaela García; María Falconí; Ariana Alava	Colombia; Ana Quijano; Camila Sabogal; Luciana Martínez

==== Mixed ====
Event	Gold	Silver	Bronze
Doubles	Mexico; Wally Ávila; Mariana Narvaez	Peru; Amaro Castillo; Luciana Castillo	Argentina; Paula Rivero; Segundo Portabales
Doubles	Mexico; Wally Ávila; Mariana Narvaez	Peru; Amaro Castillo; Luciana Castillo	Paraguay; Damián Casarino; Fiorella Gatti

== Results ==
=== Men's singles ===
Date: August 11–12

Round of 32
Martín Falconí (ECU)	3
Alejandro Ballón (PER)	0
Emerson Rivera (ESA)	0
Gilberto Aceves (MEX)	3
Darien Benn (BAR)	3
Miguel Orellana (ESA)	0
Andrés Acosta (PAR)	0
Ángel Enríquez (GUA)	3

Round of 16
Segundo Portabales (ARG)	3
Martín Falconí (ECU)	0
Damián Casarino (PAR)	2
Erick Fonseca (GUA)	3
Murilo Penteado (BRA)	3
Alex Stewart (BAR)	0
Gilberto Acevedo (MEX)	1
Juan Irisarri (COL)	3
Javier Romo (ECU)	3
Darien Benn (BAR)	0
Amaro Castillo (PER)	2
Santiago Medina (MEX)	3
Francisco Alfonso (ARG)	0
Isaías Melo (BRA)	3
Ángel Enríquez (GUA)	0
Juan José Torres (COL)	3

Quarterfinals
Segundo Portabales (ARG)	3
Erick Fonseca (GUA)	0
Murilo Penteado (BRA)	1
Juan Irisarri (COL)	3
Javier Romo (ECU)	3
Santiago Medina (MEX)	1
Isaías Melo (BRA)	1
Juan José Torres (COL)	3

Semifinals
Segundo Portabales (ARG)	3
Juan Irisarri (COL)	1
Javier Romo (ECU)	0
Juan José Torres (COL)	3

Final
Segundo Portabales (ARG)	1
Juan José Torres (COL)	3

=== Men's doubles ===
Date: August 13–14

Round of 16
Emerson Rivera (ESA); Miguel Orellana (ESA)	2
Andrés Acosta (PAR); Thiago Speranza (PAR)	1

Quarterfinals
Juan José Torres (COL); Juan Irisarri (COL)	2
Emerson Rivera (ESA); Miguel Orellana (ESA)	0
Santiago Medina (MEX); Gilberto Aceves (MEX)	2
Ángel Enríquez (GUA); Erick Fonseca (GUA)	0
Francisco Alfonso (ARG); Santiago Portabales (ARG)	2
Esteban Davalos (ECU); Martín Falconí (ECU)	0
João Carlos Santos (BRA); Murilo Penteado (BRA)	2
Darien Benn (BAR); Alex Stewart (BAR)	1

Semifinals
{ Juan José Torres (COL); Juan Irisarri (COL)	2
Santiago Medina (MEX); Gilberto Aceves (MEX)	1
Francisco Alfonso (ARG); Santiago Portabales (ARG)	2
João Carlos Santos (BRA); Murilo Penteado (BRA)	1

Final
Juan José Torres (COL); Juan Irisarri (COL)	2
Francisco Alfonso (ARG); Santiago Portabales (ARG)	0

=== Men's team ===
Date: August 15–16

Round of 12
Barbados	2
El Salvador	1
Peru	1
Paraguay	2

Quarterfinals
Colombia	2
Barbados	0
Mexico	2
Brazil	1
Ecuador	2
Guatemala	0
Paraguay	0
Argentina	2

Semifinals
Colombia	2
Mexico	0
Ecuador	1
Argentina	2

Final
Colombia	2
Argentina	0

5th-8th place
Barbados	0
Brazil	3
Guatemala	2
Paraguay	1

5th place
Brazil	2
Guatemala	0
7th place
Barbados	3
Paraguay	0

9th Place
El Salvador	2
Peru	1

=== Women's singles ===
Date: August 11–12

Round of 32
Fernanda Vilches (CHI)	0
Rafaela García (ECU)	3
Camila Sabogal (COL)	3
Luana León (PER)	0
Ana Botello (MEX)	3
Camila Needham (CHI)	0
Nicole Krauch (PAR)	3
Eboni Atherley (BAR)	0

Round of 16
Fiorella Gatti (PAR)	3
Rafaela García (ECU)	0
Clara Braga (BRA)	1
Tabita Gaitán (GUA)	3
Paula Rivero (ARG)	3
Sumairaa Suleman (BAR)	0
Camila Sabogal (COL)	0
Mariana Narvaez (MEX)	3
María Falconí (ECU)	3
Ana Botello (MEX)	1
Candela Bernard (ARG)	3
Darlyn Sandoval (GUA)	1
Luciana Castillo (PER)	3
Ana Quijano (COL)	0
Nicole Krauch (PAR)	0
Laura Silva (BRA)	3

Quarterfinals
Fiorella Gatti (PAR)	3
Tabita Gaitán (GUA)	0
Paula Rivero (ARG)	2
Mariana Narvaez (MEX)	3
María Falconí (ECU)	3
Candela Bernard (ARG)	0
Luciana Castillo (PER)	0
Laura Silva (BRA)	3

Semifinals
Fiorella Gatti (PAR)	3
Mariana Narvaez (MEX)	1
María Falconí (ECU)	0
Laura Silva (BRA)	3

Final
Fiorella Gatti (PAR)	3
Laura Silva (BRA)	0

=== Women's doubles ===
Date: August 13–14

Round of 16
Sumairaa Suleman (BAR); Eboni Atherley (BAR)	2
Fernanda Vilches (CHI); Camila Needham (CHI)	1
Clara Braga (BRA); Giulia Colleoni (BRA)	2
Giuliana Cino (PAR); Nicole Krauch (PAR)	0

Quarterfinals
Tabita Gaitán (GUA); Darlyn Sandoval (GUA)	2
Sumairaa Suleman (BAR); Eboni Atherley (BAR)	0
Luana León (PER); Joaquina Llanos (PER)	0
Camila Sabogal (COL); Ana Quijano (COL)	2
Rafaela García (ECU); María Faloní (ECU)	2
Candela Bernard (ARG); Lola Aznarez (ARG)	1
Clara Braga (BRA); Giulia Colleoni (BRA)	0
Paola Franco (MEX); Ana Botello (MEX)	2

Semifinals
Tabita Gaitán (GUA); Darlyn Sandoval (GUA)	2
Camila Sabogal (COL); Ana Quijano (COL)	1
Rafaela García (ECU); María Faloní (ECU)
Paola Franco (MEX); Ana Botello (MEX)	2

Final
Tabita Gaitán (GUA); Darlyn Sandoval (GUA)	2
Paola Franco (MEX); Ana Botello (MEX)	1

=== Women's team ===
Date: August 15–16

Round of 16
Chile	2
Barbados	0
Peru	1
Colombia	2

Quarterfinals
Paraguay	2
Chile	1
Argentina	0
Ecuador	2
Mexico	2
Guatemala	0
Colombia	2
Brazil	1

Semifinals
Paraguay	1
Ecuador	2
Mexico	2
Colombia	0

Final
Ecuador	0
Mexico	2

5th-8th place
Chile	0
Argentina	2
Guatemala	0
Brazil	2

5th place
Argentina	2
Brazil	0
7th place
Chile	0
Guatemala	2

9th Place
Barbados	1
Peru	2

=== Mixed doubles ===
Date: August 15–16

Round of 16
Luciana Martínez (COL); José Santamaría (COL)	0
Luciana Castillo (PER); Amaro Castillo (PER)	2

Quarterfinals
Ariana Alava (ECU); Javier Romo (ECU)	0
Luciana Castillo (PER); Amaro Castillo (PER)	2
Ana Lucía Sánchez (GUA); Israel Monteros (GUA)	0
Fiorella Gatti (PAR); Damián Casarino (PAR)	2
Wally Ávila (MEX); Mariana Narvaez (MEX)	2
Isaias Melo (BRA); Laura Silva (BRA)	0
Sarrayah Yearwood (BAR); Aidan Parris (BAR)	0
Segundo Portabales (ARG); Paula Ribero (ARG)	2

Semifinals
Luciana Castillo (PER); Amaro Castillo (PER)	2
Fiorella Gatti (PAR); Damián Casarino (PAR)	0
Wally Ávila (MEX); Mariana Narvaez (MEX)	2
Segundo Portabales (ARG); Paula Ribero (ARG)	0

Final
Luciana Castillo (PER); Amaro Castillo (PER)	0
Wally Ávila (MEX); Mariana Narvaez (MEX)	2
