= Artistic skating at the 2025 Junior Pan American Games =

Artistic roller skating at the 2025 Junior American Games
- Venue: National Olympic Velodrome
- Start date: August 21, 2025
- End date: August 22, 2025
- No. of events: 4
- Competitors: 29 from 11 nations

The artistic skating events at the 2025 Junior Pan American Games were held at the National Olympic Velodrome, located in the Olympic Park in Luque, in the Greater Asuncion area. The events were contested between August 21 and 22, 2025.

Four events were contested (two for men and two for women): two freestyle and two solo dance. The solo dance events were added for the 2025 games. The winner of each event qualified for the 2027 Pan American Games in Lima, Peru.

== Qualification ==
Eight athletes qualified per event, based on Pan American Championships.

== Medal summary ==
=== Medal table ===
* Host nation (Paraguay)

Rank	Nation	Gold	Silver	Bronze	Total
1	Brazil	2	2	0	4
2	Colombia	2	1	1	4
3	Paraguay*	0	1	0	1
4	Argentina	0	0	1	1
4	Chile	0	0	1	1
4	United States	0	0	1	1
Totals (6 entries)		4	4	4	12

=== Medalists ===
==== Men ====
Event	Gold	Silver	Bronze
Freestyle	Erik Medziukevicius; Brazil	Deivi Rojas; Colombia	Juan Rodríguez; Argentina
Solo Dance	Jeshua Folleco; Colombia	Erik Medziukevicius; Brazil	Sean Folstein; United States

==== Women ====
Event	Gold	Silver	Bronze
Freestyle	Paulina Ruiz; Colombia	Laura Guimarães; Brazil	Josefa Ramos; Chile
Solo Dance	Lia Iwazaki; Brazil	Paloma García; Paraguay	María Muñoz; Colombia

== Results ==
=== Men's freestyle ===
Short program – August 21 / Long program – August 22

Rank	Name	Nation	SP	Rank	LP	Rank	Total points
1st place, gold medalist(s)	Erik Medziukevicius	Brazil	83.80	1	130.05	1	213.85
2nd place, silver medalist(s)	Deivi Rojas	Colombia	68.80	3	118.17	2	186.97
3rd place, bronze medalist(s)	Juan Rodríguez	Argentina	69.93	2	114.63	3	184.56
4	Christopher Paredes	Ecuador	40.37	4	68.42	4	107.79
5	Agustín Vejar	Chile	37.92	6	54.57	5	92.49
6	Cesar Caballero	Paraguay	38.85	5	49.57	8	88.42
7	Bruno Nuñez	Mexico	29.03	8	52.82	6	81.85
8	David Chestnut	United States	29.93	7	50.99	7	80.92

=== Men's solo dance ===
Style dance – August 21 / Free dance – August 22

Rank	Name	Nation	SD	Rank	FD	Rank	Total points
1st place, gold medalist(s)	Jeshua Folleco	Colombia	61.16	1	87.14	1	148.30
2nd place, silver medalist(s)	Erik Medziukevicius	Brazil	57.82	2	77.76	2	135.58
3rd place, bronze medalist(s)	Sean Folstein	United States	54.66	3	74.46	3	129.12
4	Matías Ovejero	Argentina	43.83	4	46.36	6	90.19
5	Cesar Caballero	Paraguay	35.36	6	52.95	4	88.31
6	Maximiliano But	Chile	37.17	5	46.82	5	83.99
7	Ivan Perugorria	Cuba	23.81	7	24.74	7	48.55

=== Women's freestyle ===
Short program – August 21 / Long program – August 22

Rank	Name	Nation	SP	Rank	LP	Rank	Total points
1st place, gold medalist(s)	Paulina Ruiz	Colombia	53.01	4	88.27	1	141.28
2nd place, silver medalist(s)	Laura Guimarães	Brazil	57.20	1	79.09	3	136.29
3rd place, bronze medalist(s)	Josefa Ramos	Chile	50.35	5	83.62	2	133.97
4	Zoe Manggia	Argentina	54.15	3	70.66	4	124.81
5	Valentina Lomas	Mexico	54.99	2	62.07	6	117.06
6	Zaira Gonzalez	Uruguay	43.57	6	67.40	5	110.97
7	Nahir Santacruz	Paraguay	41.81	7	57.87	8	99.68
8	Keyla Diaz	Ecuador	40.86	8	58.36	7	99.22

=== Women's solo dance ===
Style dance – August 21 / Free dance – August 22

Rank	Name	Nation	SD	Rank	FD	Rank	Total points
1st place, gold medalist(s)	Lia Iwazaki	Brazil	59.44	1	78.31	1	137.75
2nd place, silver medalist(s)	Paloma García	Paraguay	58.84	2	77.48	2	136.32
3rd place, bronze medalist(s)	María Muñoz	Colombia	58.24	3	75.23	3	133.47
4	Martina Alterio	Argentina	49.42	4	64.96	4	114.38
5	Renata Borbarán	Chile	46.19	5	56.38	6	102.57
6	Lillian Gardner	United States	43.03	6	58.51	5	101.54
7	Camila Leonor Gutierrez	Panama	40.21	7	51.30	7	91.51
8	Joanna Ibarra	Mexico	33.28	8	43.62	8	76.90
