= Dominica at the 2025 Junior Pan American Games =

- IOC code: DMA
- NOC: Dominica Olympic Committee

in Asunción, Paraguay
- Competitors: 3
- Medals: Gold 1 Silver 0 Bronze 0 Total 1

Junior Pan American Games appearances (overview)
- 2021; 2025

Dominica is competing at the 2025 Junior Pan American Games in Asunción from August 9 to 23, 2025.

The Dominican team consists of 3 athletes.

== Medals by sport ==
Sport	Gold	Silver	Bronze	Total
Athletics	1	0	0	1
Totals (1 entries)	1	0	0	1

== Medalists ==
The following Dominican competitors won medals at the games.

Medal	Name	Sport	Event	Date
Gold	Treneese Hamilton	Athletics	Women's Shot Put	August 21

== See also ==
- Dominica at the Junior Pan American Games
