= Jazmín López =

Mexican footballer (born 2001)

Personal information
- Full name: Jazmín Montserrat López Delgado
- Date of birth: 6 August 2001 (age 25)
- Place of birth: Corregidora, Querétaro, Mexico
- Height: 1.64 m (5 ft 5 in)
- Position: Centre-back

Team information
- Current team: Toluca
- Number: 3

Senior career*
Years	Team	Apps	(Gls)
2018–2020	Querétaro	43	(1)
2020–2021	Mazatlán	30	(4)
2021–	Toluca	49	(0)
- * Club domestic league appearances and goals as of 31 January 2026 ‡ National team caps and goals as of 19 February 2025

Jazmín Montserrat López Delgado (born 6 August 2001) is a Mexican professional footballer who plays as a defender for Liga MX Femenil side Toluca and the Mexico women's national team.

== Career ==
In 2018, she started her career in Querétaro. In 2020, she was transferred to Mazatlán. Since 2021, she is a player of Toluca.
