= Guatemala at the 2025 Junior Pan American Games =

- IOC code: GUA
- NOC: Guatemalan Olympic Committee

in Asunción, Paraguay
- Competitors: 122
- Flag bearers: Emily Padilla; Faberson Bonilla
- Medals: Gold 7 Silver 3 Bronze 4 Total 14

Junior Pan American Games appearances (overview)
- 2021; 2025

Guatemala competed at the 2025 Junior Pan American Games in Asunción from August 9 to 23, 2025.

The Guatemalan team consists of 122 athletes.

== Medals by sport ==
Sport	Gold	Silver	Bronze	Total
Golf	2	0	0	2
Swimming	2	0	0	2
Archery	1	1	0	2
Shooting	1	0	0	1
Squash	1	0	0	1
Fencing	0	1	0	1
Sailing	0	1	0	1
Speed skating	0	0	1	1
Taekwondo	0	0	1	1
Weightlifting	0	0	1	1
Wrestling	0	0	1	1
Totals (11 entries)	7	3	4	14

== Medalists ==
The following Guatemalan competitors won medals at the games.

Medal	Name	Sport	Event	Date
Gold	Christian García	Archery	Men's Individual Recurve	August 12
Gold	Gabriel Palacios	Golf	Men's Individual	August 23
Gold	Elzbieta Aldana	Golf	Women's Individual	August 23
Gold	Emily Padilla	Shooting	Women's Skeet	August 10
Gold	Darlyn Sandoval; Tabita Gaitán	Squash	Women's Double	August 14
Gold	Roberto Bonilla	Swimming	Men's 200m Breaststroke	August 12
Gold	Roberto Bonilla	Swimming	Men's 200m Individual Medley	August 14
Silver	Christian García; Ian Pablo Allen	Archery	Men's Team Recurve	August 12
Silver	Christian Porras	Fencing	Men's Foil Individual	August 12
Silver	Cristina Castellanos	Sailing	One-person Dinghy (ILCA 6)	August 17
Bronze	Faberson Bonilla	Speed skating	Men's Singles 200m Time Trial	August 18
Bronze	Nicole Way	Taekwondo	Women's Kyorugi -49Kg	August 15
Bronze	Derisson Almazán	Weightlifting	Men's 98Kg	August 22
Bronze	César Ubico	Wrestling	Men's Freestyle 86kg	August 22

== See also ==
- Guatemala at the Junior Pan American Games
