= Parque Olímpico, Paraguay =

Sports complex in Paraguay

Parque Olímpico
- Interactive map of Parque Olímpico
- Address: Autopista Ñu Guazú; Luque; Paraguay
- Coordinates: 25°15′33″S 57°31′50″W
- Owner: Paraguayan Olympic Committee

Construction
- Opened: 2017

Tenant
- Team Paraguay

The Parque Olímpico ('Olympic Park') is a sports complex in Luque, Paraguay, near the country's capital, Asunción. It is owned by the Paraguayan Olympic Committee, and was inaugurated on June 1, 2017. The construction had an investment of more than 59,000 million guaraníes.

It has an Olympic Training Center, a synthetic athletics track, a multipurpose sports center, a tennis complex, volleyball and beach soccer courts, a shooting range, among others.

The park hosted the 2019 FIFA Beach Soccer World Cup. In 2022 it was one of the main venues for the 2022 South American Games, and in 2025 it was for the 2025 Junior Pan American Games.

== Facilities ==
- BMX track
- Bocce facility
- COP Arena Óscar Harrison
- Héroes de Curupayty Stadium
- National Archery Center
- National Hockey Center
- National Olympic Velodrome
- Los Pynandi World Cup Stadium
- Olympic Aquatic Center
- Olympic Hotel
- Olympic Skatepark
- Olympic Training Center
- Padel courts
- Paraguayan Football Association
- Paraguayan Golf Association
- Running track
- Shooting Range
- Speed Skating track
- Sports Sciences Center
- Tennis courts
