= Argentina at the 2025 Junior Pan American Games =

- IOC code: ARG
- NOC: Argentine Olympic Committee

in Asunción, Paraguay
- Competitors: 339
- Flag bearers (opening): Ulises Saravia; Juana Castellaro Morello
- Flag bearers (closing): Vicente Vergauven; Paulina Barreiro
- Medals Ranked 5th: Gold 27 Silver 38 Bronze 30 Total 95

Junior Pan American Games appearances (overview)
- 2021; 2025

Argentina is competing at the 2025 Junior Pan American Games in Asunción from August 9 to 23, 2025.

The Argentinian team consists of 339 athletes, being the third team with the biggest delegation at this edition of the games.

== Medals by sport ==
Sport	Gold	Silver	Bronze	Total
Canoeing	7	2	2	11
Swimming	4	6	3	13
Cycling	3	8	2	13
Athletics	2	1	3	6
3x3 basketball	1	0	0	1
Cycling	0	7	2	9
Gymnastics	0	2	1	3
Rowing	0	2	0	2
Shooting	0	1	2	3
Fencing	0	1	0	1
Squash	0	1	0	1
Archery	0	0	2	2
Artistic skating	0	0	1	1
Judo	0	0	1	1
Skateboarding	0	0	1	1
Totals (15 entries)	17	31	20	68

== Medalists ==
The following Argentine competitors won medals at the games.

Medal	Name	Sport	Event	Date
Gold	Agostina Hein	Swimming	Women's 400m Freestyle	August 10
Gold	Malena Santillán	Swimming	Women's 200m Backstroke	August 11
Gold	Ulises Saravia	Swimming	Men's 100m Backstroke	August 12
Gold	Agostina Hein	Swimming	Women's 400m Individual Medley	August 13
Gold	Santiago Gruñeiro	Cycling	Men's Omnium	August 14
Gold	José Materano; Matías Chaillou; Ulises Cazau; Matías Santiso; Dante Nicola; Ulises Saravia	Swimming	Men's 4 x 100m Medley Relay	August 14
Gold	Agostina Hein	Swimming	Women's 200m Individual Medley	August 14
Gold	Ignacio Espínola	Taekwondo	Men's Kyorugi -58Kg	August 15
Gold	Dante Pagani; Ian Vertberger	Tennis	Men's Doubles	August 15
Gold	Sol Larraya; Candela Vázquez	Tennis	Women's Doubles	August 15
Gold	Argentina men's U21 rugby sevens team: Manuel Domnanovich Danilo Ghisolfi; Valentín Maldonado; Juan Batac; Jerónimo Sorondo; Agustín García; Sebastián Dubuc; Juan Carreras; Bautista Lescano; Mateo Fossati; Luca Corleto; Valentino Rebuffi	Rugby sevens	Men's Team	August 17
Gold	Santino Mazzucchelli; Alejo Maggi; Juan Frontera; Martin Molina	3x3 basketball	Men's Team	August 17
Gold	Julieta Benedetti	Cycling	Women's Road Race	August 17
Gold	Argentina men's U21 field hockey team: Lorenzo Somaini; Juan Boretti; Tomás Ruiz; Thiago Zalazar; Lautaro Martínez; Luciano Del Pozo; Joaquín Costa; Santiago Fernández; Mateo Serrano; Joaquín Ruiz; Joaquín Barberis; Mateo Torrigiani; Bruno Correa; Matias Andreotti; Juan Fernández; Nicolás Rodríguez	Field hockey	Men's Team	August 18
Gold	Argentina women's U21 field hockey team: Juana Castellaro; Victoria Falasco; Carolina Lardies; Maria Di Santo; Lara Casas; Lourdes Pisthón; Bárbara Raposo; Sol Olalla; Catalina Stamati; Sol Guignet; Delfina Mussari; Pilar Pisthón; Delfina Persoglia; Mercedes Artola; Máxima Duportal; Alastra Milagros	Field hockey	Women's Team	August 19
Gold	Juan Manuel Arrieguez	Athletics	Men's Shot Put	August 19
Gold	Tomás Olivera	Athletics	Men's Hammer Throw	August 20
Gold	Francisco Giorgis	Water skiing	Men's Jump	August 20
Gold	Aramís Sánchez	Canoeing	Men's C1 1000m	August 20
Gold	Paulina Barreiro	Canoeing	Women's K1 200m	August 20
Gold	Aramís Sánchez	Canoeing	Men's C1 500m	August 21
Gold	Vicente Vergauven; Luca Micatrotta; Agustín Sánchez; Baltazar Itria	Canoeing	Men's K4 500m	August 22
Gold	Priscila Vukonich; Martina Catalano; Paulina Barreiro; Candela Velázquez	Canoeing	Women's K4 500m	August 22
Gold	Federico Capello	Cycling	Men's BMX Racing	August 22
Gold	Vicente Vergauven; Baltazar Itria	Canoeing	Men's K2 500m	August 23
Gold	Agustín Sánchez; Paulina Barreiro	Canoeing	Mixed K2 500m	August 23
Gold	Juan Gallardo	Karate	Men's -60kg	August 23
Silver	Julieta Lucas	Gymnastics	Women's All-Around	August 20
Silver	Julieta Lucas	Gymnastics	Women's Uneven Bars	August 21
Silver	Santiago Barberia	Athletics	Men's High Jump	August 21
Silver	Vicente Vergauven	Canoeing	Men's K1 1000m	August 20
Silver	Paulina Barreiro	Canoeing	Women's K1 500m	August 21

== Field hockey ==
Argentina qualified a men's and women's team of 16 athletes each (32 athletes in total).

Key:

- P – Match decided by penalty-shootout.

Summary

Team	Event	Group stage				Semifinal	Final / BM / Pl.	
Team	Event	Opposition Result	Opposition Result	Opposition Result	Rank	Opposition Result	Opposition Result	Rank
Argentina U-21 men's	Men's tournament	Brazil; W 11–0	United States; W 8–0	Paraguay; W 20–0	1	Chile; W 5–0	Canada; W 4–2	1st place, gold medalist(s)
Argentina U-21 women's	Women's tournament	Uruguay; W 3–0	Uruguay; W 6–0	Paraguay; W 12–0	1	Chile; W 4–1	United States; W 3–0	1st place, gold medalist(s)

=== Men's tournament ===
The Argentina men's team qualified after placing in the top five of the 2024 Men's Junior Pan American Championship in Surrey, British Columbia.

Roster

2. Lorenzo Somaini
3. Juan Boretti
5. Tomás Ruiz (C)
6. Thiago Zalazar
7. Lautaro Martínez
8. Luciano Del Pozo
9. Joaquín Costa
10. Santiago Fernández
11. Mateo Serrano
15. Joaquin Ruiz Saporiti (GK)
16. Joaquin Barberis
18. Mateo Torrigiani
21. Bruno Correa
23. Matías Andreotti
24. Juan Fernández
30. Nicolás Rodríguez

Pool B

Pos	Team	Pld	W	D	L	GF	GA	GD	Pts	Qualification
1	Argentina	3	3	0	0	39	0	+39	9	Semi-finals
2	United States	3	2	0	1	9	11	−2	6	Semi-finals
3	Brazil	3	0	1	2	3	15	−12	1	
4	Paraguay (H)	3	0	1	2	2	27	−25	1	

Source: FIH
Rules for classification: 1) points; 2) matches won; 3) goal difference; 4) goals for; 5) head-to-head result; 6) field goals for.
(H) Hosts

10 August 2025
17:30

Argentina	11–0	Brazil
Serrano 2'; Boretti 9'; Martínez 11'; S. Fernández 37', 53'; Costa 44'; Torrigiani 45'; Correa 49', 50'; Rodríguez 52'; J. Fernández 56'	Report

Umpires:
Fabian Romero (PAR)
Claudio Martinez (URU)

12 August 2025
17:30

United States	0–8	Argentina
	Report	Rodríguez 12', 23'; Torrigiani 26'; Boretti 30+'; S. Fernández 34'; Correa 38', 56'; T. Ruiz 60'

Umpires:
Fabian Romero (PAR)
Andrey Umana (CRC)

14 August 2025
19:30

Argentina	20–0	Paraguay
Rodríguez 6', 11'; S. Fernández 15', 33', 37', 54', 56'; Torrigiani 19', 29', 49', 57'; Correa 23', 29', 30', 48', 50'; Barberis 26'; Costa 38'; Serrano 40'; T. Ruiz 44'	Report

Umpires:
Erika Barbera (USA)
Nora Struchtrup (CAN)

Semi-finals

16 August 2025
17:30

Argentina	5–0	Chile
Correa 1', 60'; J. Fernández 23'; Rodríguez 25'; Boretti 41'	Report

Umpires:
Brian Tyson (USA)
Pambavasan Manikandan (CAN)

Gold medal match

18 August 2025
19:45

Argentina	4–2	Canada
Torrigiani 14'; T. Ruiz 27'; Rodríguez 36'; Correa 45'	Report	De Souza 53', 60'

Umpires:
Kevin George (TTO)
Ricardo Albertz (CHI)

=== Women's tournament ===
The Argentina women's team qualified after placing in the top five of the 2024 Men's Junior Pan American Championship in Surrey, British Columbia.

Roster

2. Juana Castellaro (C)
5. Victoria Falasco
6. Carolina Lardies
8. Maria Di Santo
10. Lara Casas
11. Lourdes Pisthón
12. Barbara Raposo
15. Sol Olalla
18. Catalina Stamati
19. Sol Guignet
20. Delfina Mussari
23. Pilar Pisthón
30. Delfina Persoglia
32. Mercedes Artola (GK)
37. Maxima Duportal
64. Milagros Alastra

Pool A

Pos	Team	Pld	W	D	L	GF	GA	GD	Pts	Qualification
1	Argentina	3	3	0	0	21	0	+21	9	Semi-finals
2	Uruguay	3	2	0	1	5	3	+2	6	Semi-finals
3	Canada	3	1	0	2	2	9	−7	3	
4	Paraguay (H)	3	0	0	3	0	16	−16	0	

Source: FIH
Rules for classification: 1) points; 2) matches won; 3) goal difference; 4) goals for; 5) head-to-head result; 6) field goals for.
(H) Hosts

11 August 2025
17:30

Argentina	3–0	Uruguay
D. Persoglia 4'; Guignet 27'; P. Pisthón 36'	Report

Umpires:
Catalina Wenzel (CHI)
Katelyn Makovec (USA)

13 August 2025
17:30

Canada	0–6	Argentina
	Report	Guignet 12'; Alastra 25', 26', 47'; P. Pisthón 38', 51'

Umpires:
Sofia Aleman (URU)
Erika Barbera (USA)

15 August 2025
19:30

Argentina	12–0	Paraguay
Olalla 4'; L. Pisthón 8', 59'; Casas 8', 11', 24'; Di Santo 9'; Raposo 36'; Guignet 38'; Falasco 44'; Castellaro 52'; Duportal 55'	Report

Umpires:
Catalina Wenzel (CHI)
Erika Barbera (USA)

Semi-finals

17 August 2025
17:30

Argentina	4–1	Chile
Alastra 9', 45', 48'; Castellaro 32'	Report	Solari 30'

Umpires:
Katelyn Makovec (USA)
Erika Barbera (USA)

Gold medal match

19 August 2025
19:45

Argentina	3–0	United States
L. Pisthón 8', 31'; Casas 56'	Report

Umpires:
Victoria Pazos (PAR)
Nora Struchtrup (CAN)

== See also ==
- Argentina at the Junior Pan American Games
