= Puerto Rico at the 2025 Junior Pan American Games =

- IOC code: PUR
- NOC: Puerto Rico Olympic Committee

in Asunción, Paraguay
- Competitors: 109 in 25 sports
- Flag bearers: Gladymar Torres; Steven Moreno
- Medals: Gold 7 Silver 7 Bronze 13 Total 27

Junior Pan American Games appearances (overview)
- 2021; 2025

Puerto Rico competed at the 2025 Junior Pan American Games in Asunción, Paraguay from August 9 to 23, 2025.

The Puerto Rican team consists of 109 athletes.

== Medals by sport ==
Sport	Gold	Silver	Bronze	Total
Athletics	3	0	2	5
Table tennis	1	3	3	7
Fencing	1	0	1	2
Swimming	1	0	1	2
Karate	1	0	0	1
Wrestling	0	2	3	5
Artistic gymnastics	0	1	1	2
Tennis	0	1	0	1
Golf	0	0	1	1
Taekwondo	0	0	1	1
Totals (10 entries)	7	7	13	27

== Medalists ==
The following Puerto Rican competitors won medals at the games.

Medal	Name	Sport	Event	Date
Gold	Xavier Ruiz	Swimming	Men's 100m Breaststroke	August 10
Gold	Gabriela Maria Lin Hwang	Fencing	Women's Sabre Individual	August 12
Gold	Edmarie León	Table tennis	Women's Singles	August 18
Gold	Elysia Hernández	Karate	Women's -68kg	August 21
Gold	José Figueroa	Athletics	Men's 200 m	August 21
Gold	Miguel Ángel Pantojas	Athletics	Men's 800 m	August 22
Gold	Yarielis Torres	Athletics	Women's Hammer Throw	August 22
Silver	Aurora Lugo; Yannik Álvarez	Tennis	Mixed Doubles	August 16
Silver	Enrique Rios; Kristal Melendez	Table tennis	Mixed Doubles	August 17
Silver	Edmarie León; Kristal Melendez	Table tennis	Women's Doubles	August 18
Silver	Enrique Ríos; Steven Moreno	Table tennis	Men's Team	August 21
Silver	Jensuel Soto	Artistic gymnastics	Men's Rings	August 21
Silver	Paola Rodríguez	Wrestling	Women's Freestyle 76kg	August 21
Silver	Eligh Rivera	Wrestling	Men's Freestyle 65kg	August 22
Bronze	Sebastián García	Fencing	Women's Foil Individual	August 12
Bronze	Xavier Ruiz	Swimming	Men's 200m Individual Medley	August 14
Bronze	Illay Rodríguez	Taekwondo	Men's Kyorugi -58Kg	August 15
Bronze	Edmarie León; Steven Moreno	Table tennis	Mixed Doubles	August 17
Bronze	Steven Moreno	Table tennis	Men's Singles	August 18
Bronze	Frances Colón	Athletics	Women's 100m	August 19
Bronze	Edmarie León; Kristal Melendez	Table tennis	Women's Team	August 21
Bronze	Carina Giangeruso	Wrestling	Women's Freestyle 62kg	August 21
Bronze	Ethan Vergara	Wrestling	Men's Freestyle 125kg	August 22
Bronze	Adrian Samano	Wrestling	Men's Freestyle 57kg	August 22
Bronze	José Figueroa; Alejandro Rosado; Jarell Cruz; Natanael Vigo	Athletics	Men's 4 x 400m Relay	August 22
Bronze	Jensuel Soto	Artistic gymnastics	Men's Vault	August 22
Bronze	Alejandro Caraballo	Golf	Men's Individual	August 23

== See also ==
- Puerto Rico at the Junior Pan American Games
