= Paraguay at the 2025 Junior Pan American Games =

- IOC code: PAR
- NOC: Paraguayan Olympic Committee

in Asunción, Paraguay
- Competitors: 327 in 28 sports
- Flag bearers: Nicole Martínez; Lars Flaming
- Medals: Gold 3 Silver 6 Bronze 14 Total 23

Junior Pan American Games appearances (overview)
- 2021; 2025

Paraguay competed at the 2025 Junior Pan American Games in Asunción from August 9 to 23, 2025. Paraguay was the host nation of the games, marking the first time the country hosts the games.

The Paraguayan team consisted of 327 athletes competing in 28 sports.

Flag bearers at the opening ceremony were rower Nicole Martínez and javelin thrower Lars Flaming, both athletes later won gold medals at the Games.

== Medals by sport ==
Sport	Gold	Silver	Bronze	Total
Rowing	1	3	2	6
Squash	1	0	2	3
Athletics	1	0	1	2
Golf	0	2	1	3
Artistic skating	0	1	0	1
Taekwondo	0	0	2	2
3x3 Basketball	0	0	1	1
Beach volleyball	0	0	1	1
Fencing	0	0	1	1
Handball	0	0	1	1
Tennis	0	0	1	1
Weightlifting	0	0	1	1
Totals (12 entries)	3	6	14	23

== Medalists ==
The following Paraguayan competitors won medals at the games.

Medal	Name	Sport	Event	Date
Gold	Nicole Martínez	Rowing	Women's single sculls	August 10
Gold	Fiorella Gatti	Squash	Women's singles	August 12
Gold	Lars Flaming	Athletics	Men's javelin throw	August 18
Silver	Nicolás Villalba; Nicolás Invernizzi	Rowing	Men's coxless pair	August 10
Silver	Fiorela Rodríguez; Agustina López; Nicole Martínez; Lucía Martínez	Rowing	Women's coxless four	August 10
Silver	Nicole Martínez; Fiorela Rodríguez	Rowing	Women's coxless pair	August 12
Silver	Benjamín Fernández; Franco Fernández; María Inés Jaime; Victoria Livieres	Golf	Men's Individual	August 23
Silver	Paloma García	Artistic skating	Women's Solo Dance	August 22
Silver	Benjamín Fernández	Golf	Mixed Team	August 23
Bronze	Janine Hanspach	Fencing	Women's épée individual	August 10
Bronze	Fiorela Rodríguez; Agustina López; Nicole Martínez; Lucía Martínez	Rowing	Women's quadruple sculls	August 13
Bronze	Fiorela Rodríguez; Nicolás Villalba; Gabriel Yser; Agustina López; Nicolás Invernizzi; Alejo Gimenez; Nicole Martínez; Juan Iglesias; Lucía Martínez	Rowing	Mixed eight	August 13
Bronze	Fiorella Gatti; Damián Casarino	Squash	Mixed doubles	August 14
Bronze	Giovana Silva; Luana Pérez; Fiorella Enriquez; KarenCantero; Ivana Ibañez; Maria Arzamendia; Anna Macke; Thiara Villasboa; Ximena Palma; Valentina Lombardo; Milagros Samaniego; Maria Paz Quiñonez; Renata Sosa; Vannia Recalde; Victoria Pellegrini	Handball	Women's team	August 15
Bronze	Fiorella Gatti; Nicole Krauch; Giuliana Cino	Squash	Women's team	August 16
Bronze	Alex Santino Núñez; Catalina Delmas	Tennis	Mixed doubles	August 16
Bronze	Rubén Arce	Taekwondo	Men's individual traditional poomsae	August 17
Bronze	Luz Areco; Hilda Vera; Esteban Trebol; Mauro Melgarejo; Alejandro Añazco; Juan Daniel Gaona	Taekwondo	Mixed kyorugi team	August 17
Bronze	Antonella Luraghi; Manuela Ramírez; Agostina Ochipinti; Ana Brítez	3x3 basketball	Women's team	August 17
Bronze	Violeta Martino	Weightlifting	Women's 53 kg	August 20
Bronze	Ana Paula Argüello	Athletics	Women's heptathlon	August 20
Bronze	Fiorella Núñez; Denisse Alvarez	Beach volleyball	Women's team	August 22
Bronze	Victoria Livieres	Golf	Women's Individual	August 23

== See also ==
- Paraguay at the Junior Pan American Games
