= El Salvador at the 2025 Junior Pan American Games =

- IOC code: ESA
- NOC: El Salvador Olympic Committee

in Asunción, Paraguay
- Competitors: 63 in 23 sports
- Flag bearers: Alexis Molina; Maya Aubert Gómez
- Medals: Gold 0 Silver 2 Bronze 1 Total 3

Junior Pan American Games appearances (overview)
- 2021; 2025

El Salvador competed at the 2025 Junior Pan American Games in Asunción, Paraguay from August 9 to 23, 2025.

The Salvadoran team consists of 63 athletes in 23 sports.

== Medals by sport ==
Sport	Gold	Silver	Bronze	Total
Speed skating	0	2	0	2
Shooting	0	0	1	1
Totals (2 entries)	0	2	1	3

== Medalists ==
The following Salvadoran competitors won medals at the games.

Medal	Name	Sport	Event	Date
Silver	Ivonne Nóchez	Speed skating	Women's Singles 200m Time Trial	August 18
Silver	Ivonne Nóchez	Speed skating	Women's Singles 500m + Distance	August 20
Bronze	Diego Santamaria	Shooting	Men's 10m Air Rifle	August 11

== See also ==
- El Salvador at the Junior Pan American Games
