= Costa Rica at the 2025 Junior Pan American Games =

- IOC code: CRC
- NOC: Olympic Committee of Costa Rica

in Asunción, Paraguay
- Competitors: 75
- Flag bearers: Noilyn Aguilar; Alberto Vega
- Medals: Gold 0 Silver 0 Bronze 1 Total 1

Junior Pan American Games appearances (overview)
- 2021; 2025

Costa Rica is competing at the 2025 Junior Pan American Games in Asunción, Paraguay from August 9 to 23, 2025.

The Costa Rican team consists of 75 athletes.

== Medals by sport ==
Sport	Gold	Silver	Bronze	Total
Fencing	0	0	1	1
Totals (1 entries)	0	0	1	1

== Medalists ==
The following Costa Rican competitors won medals at the games.

Medal	Name	Sport	Event	Date
Bronze	Luna Mia Fernández	Fencing	Women's Épée Individual	August 10

== See also ==
- Costa Rica at the Junior Pan American Games
