= Canada at the 2025 Junior Pan American Games =

- IOC code: CAN
- NOC: Canadian Olympic Committee
- Website: www.olympic.ca

in Asunción, Paraguay 9 August 2025 – 23 August 2025
- Competitors: 157 in 21 sports
- Flag bearers (opening): Victor Lai & Rielle Bonne
- Flag bearers (closing): Thomas Tittley & Charlotte Simoneau
- Medals Ranked 6th: Gold 19 Silver 22 Bronze 22 Total 63

Junior Pan American Games appearances (overview)
- 2021; 2025

Canada sent a team of athletes to compete at the 2025 Junior Pan American Games in Asunción, Paraguay, from 9 to 23 August 2025.

On August 7, 2025, the Canadian Olympic Committee (COC) announced a team of 157 athletes (63 men and 94 women) competing in 21 sports (22 disciplines). As part of the announcement, the COC named badminton player Victor Lai and trampoline gymnast Rielle Bonne as the country's flagbearers during the opening ceremony. Meanwhile, artistic gymnast Thomas Tittley and weightlifter Charlotte Simoneau were the country's closing ceremony flagbearers.

Canada finished the event with 63 medals, and finished sixth in the medal table.

== Medallists ==
The following Canadian competitors won medals at the games. In the by discipline sections below, medalists' names are bolded.

Medal	Name	Sport	Event	Date
Gold	Rielle Bonne; Mélina Corriveau	Gymnastics	Women's synchronized trampoline	August 12
Gold	Rachel Chan	Badminton	Women's singles	August 13
Gold	Victor Lai	Badminton	Men's singles	August 13
Gold	Gabrielle Beaulieu	Taekwondo	Women's 67 kg	August 16
Gold	Marah Dykstra; Gage Grassick; Mackenzie Smith; Jade Belmore	3x3 Basketball	Women's tournament	August 17
Gold	Jadyn Keeler	Athletics	Women's 10,000 metres	August 18
Gold	Katelyn Fung; Kate Miller	Diving	Women's synchronized 10 metre platform	August 19
Gold	Matt Cullen; Benjamin Tessier	Diving	Men's synchronized 10 metre platform	August 19
Gold	Charles Ross	Water skiing	Men's slalom	August 20
Gold	Kate Pinsonneault	Water skiing	Women's jump	August 20
Gold	Jennifer Elizarov	Athletics	Women's pole vault	August 20
Gold	Dianna Proctor	Athletics	Women's 400 metres	August 20
Gold	Izzy Goudros	Athletics	Women's heptathlon	August 20
Gold	Thomas Tittley	Gymnastics	Men's floor exercise	August 21
Gold	Jude Wheeler-Dee	Athletics	Men's 1,500 metres	August 21
Gold	Charlotte Simoneau	Weightlifting	Women's 69 kg	August 22
Gold	Maria Ouyahia	Karate	Women's 55 kg	August 22
Gold	Praise Aniamaka	Athletics	Men's triple jump	August 22
Gold	Izzy Goudros; Emily Martin; Avery Pearson; Dianna Proctor	Athletics	Women's 4 × 400 metres relay	August 22
Silver	Arthur Karpukov	Judo	Men's 81 kg	August 11
Silver	Janna Hawash	Rowing	Women's eight	August 12
Silver	Janna Hawash	Archery	Women's individual recurve	August 12
Silver	Étienne Cloutier; Cody Cyman	Gymnastics	Men's synchronized trampoline	August 12
Silver	Victor Lai; Rachel Chan	Badminton	Mixed doubles	August 13
Silver	Benjamin Tessier	Diving	Men's 10 metre platform	August 18
Silver	Brooklyn Aranha; Parmveer Basra; Gurwinder Brar; Josiah Campbell; Christopher Chalut; Navdip Chandi; Leighton De Souza; Satpreet Dhadda; Caleb Fitch; Morgan Garside; Ravpreet Gill; Kirin Robinson; Sawyer Ross; Harjas Sanghera; Kale Simonson; Grant Simpson	Field hockey	Men's tournament	August 18
Silver	Natalie Chan	Table tennis	Women's singles	August 18
Silver	Avery Pearson	Athletics	Women's 800 metres	August 19
Silver	Elizabeth Desrosiers	Canoeing	Women's C-1 200 metres	August 20
Silver	Sidney Clement	Triathlon	Women's individual	August 20
Silver	Jeremiah Nubbe	Athletics	Men's hammer throw	August 20
Silver	Heather Abadie	Athletics	Women's pole vault	August 20
Silver	Jadyn Keeler	Athletics	Women's 5,000 metres	August 21
Silver	Émile Toupin	Athletics	Men's 1,500 metres	August 21
Silver	Liv Sands	Athletics	Women's shot put	August 21
Silver	Thomas Tittley	Gymnastics	Men's horizontal bars	August 22
Silver	Stella Letendre	Gymnastics	Women's floor exercise	August 22
Silver	Sidney Clement; Daniel Epp; Molly Lakustiak; Blake Harris	Triathlon	Mixed relay	August 22
Silver	Charlie Breault; Olena Verbinska	Artistic swimming	Women's duet	August 22
Silver	John O'Reilly	Athletics	Men's 800 metres	August 22
Silver	Jérémy Lantz; Brianna Smith	Canoeing	Mixed K-2 500 metres	August 23
Bronze	Alessandra Tuttle; Ella McKinley; Riley Richardson; Firinne Rolfe	Rowing	Women's coxless four	August 10
Bronze	Carla van Zyl	Judo	Women's 57 kg	August 10
Bronze	Charlie Thibault	Judo	Women's 70 kg	August 11
Bronze	Ella McKinley; Riley Richardson	Rowing	Women's coxless pair	August 12
Bronze	Jalyn Mowry; Tess Friar	Rowing	Women's double sculls	August 12
Bronze	Janna Hawash; Kylie Oliver	Archery	Women's team recurve	August 12
Bronze	John Jr Messé A Bessong	Judo	Men's +100 kg	August 12
Bronze	Katelyn Fung	Diving	Women's 10 metre platform	August 17
Bronze	Bomi Lawal; Kiki Idowu; Sarah Schonfeld; Olivia Newsome; Adia Pye; Zina Umeh; Ivy Poetker; Kennedi Stevenson; Adelaide Holmes; Charlotte Hilton; Elle Douglas; Kelsa Kempf	Rugby sevens	Women's tournament	August 17
Bronze	James Huynh	Sailing	Men's kite	August 17
Bronze	Natalie Chan; Jessie Xu	Table tennis	Women's doubles	August 17
Bronze	Kenny Ly; Laurent Jutras	Table tennis	Men's doubles	August 17
Bronze	Jessie Xu	Table tennis	Women's singles	August 18
Bronze	Carson Paul	Diving	Men's 3 metre springboard	August 19
Bronze	Jérémy Lantz	Canoeing	Men's K-1 1000 metres	August 20
Bronze	Hannah Stopnicki	Water skiing	Women's tricks	August 20
Bronze	Jacob Chambers	Water skiing	Men's jump	August 20
Bronze	Coralie Demers; Maryam Saber; Samantha Couture; Stella Letendre	Gymnastics	Women's artistic team	August 20
Bronze	Jacob Chambers	Water skiing	Men's overall	August 21
Bronze	Coralie Demers	Gymnastics	Women's vault	August 21
Bronze	Mia Friesen	Wrestling	Women's freestyle 57 kg	August 21
Bronze	Tricia Madourie	Athletics	Women's high jump	August 22

Medals by sport/discipline
Sport	1st place, gold medalist(s)	2nd place, silver medalist(s)	3rd place, bronze medalist(s)	Total
Athletics	7	7	1	**15**
Gymnastics	2	3	2	**7**
Diving	2	1	2	**5**
Badminton	2	1	0	**3**
Water skiing	2	0	3	**5**
3x3 Basketball	1	0	0	**1**
Karate	1	0	0	**1**
Taekwondo	1	0	0	**1**
Weightlifting	1	0	0	**1**
Canoeing	0	2	1	**3**
Triathlon	0	2	0	**2**
Judo	0	1	3	**4**
Rowing	0	1	3	**4**
Table tennis	0	1	3	**4**
Archery	0	1	1	**2**
Artistic swimming	0	1	0	**1**
Field hockey	0	1	0	**1**
Rugby sevens	0	0	1	**1**
Sailing	0	0	1	**1**
Wrestling	0	0	1	**1**
Total	19	22	22	63

== Competitors ==
The following is the list of number of competitors participating at the Games per sport/discipline.

Sport	Men	Women	Total
3x3 basketball	4	4	8
Archery	1	2	3
Artistic swimming	1	3	4
Athletics	8	11	19
Badminton	1	1	2
Beach volleyball	2	2	4
Canoeing	1	2	3
Diving	3	3	6
Field hockey	16	16	32
Gymnastics	6	6	12
Judo	2	4	6
Karate	2	4	6
Rowing	2	9	11
Rugby sevens	0	12	12
Sailing	2	1	3
Shooting	1	1	2
Table tennis	2	2	4
Taekwondo	0	2	2
Triathlon	2	2	4
Water skiing	3	3	6
Weightlifting	2	2	4
Wrestling	2	2	4
Total	63	94	157

== 3x3 Basketball ==
Canada qualified a men's and women's team of four athletes each. The rosters were officially named on August 7, 2025.

Summary

Team	Event	Group stage			Quarterfinal	Semifinal	Final / BM / Pl.	
Team	Event	Opposition Result	Opposition Result	Rank	Opposition Result	Opposition Result	Opposition Result	Rank
Mason Kraus; Aaron Rhooms; Yohann Sam; Shadynn Smid	Men's tournament	Puerto Rico; L 20–21	Brazil; W 21–13	2 Q	Chile; L 16–21	Classification; Paraguay; W 21–11	Fifth place match Puerto Rico; L 19–20	6
Jade Belmore; Marah Dykstra; Gage Grassick; Mackenzie Smith	Women's tournament	Paraguay; L 13–15	Puerto Rico; W 16–8	1 Q	Costa Rica; W 21–6	Brazil; W 13–10	Mexico; W 18–13	1st place, gold medalist(s)

== Archery ==
Archery Canada was given a quota of three athletes (one man and two women) by the Canadian Olympic Committee. The team was officially named on July 24, 2025.

Athlete	Event	Ranking Round		Round of 32	Round of 16	Quarterfinals	Semifinals	Final / BM	Rank
Athlete	Event	Score	Seed	Opposition Score	Opposition Score	Opposition Score	Opposition Score	Opposition Score	Rank
Kurtis Ng	Men's individual recurve	639	8 Q	Ortiz (PAR); W 6–0	Peralta (ECU); L 2–6	Did not advance			
Janna Hawash	Women's individual recurve	619	4 Q	Bye	Catalan (CHI); W 7–3	Arias (COL); W 7–1	Baptista (BRA); W 6–4	Trindade (BRA); L 2–6	2nd place, silver medalist(s)
Kylie Oliver	Women's individual recurve	599	6 Q	Bye	Zavala (PER); W 6–2	Trindade (BRA); L 0–6	Did not advance		
Janna Hawash; Kylie Oliver	Women's team recurve	1218	3 Q	—N/a		Bye	Mexico; L 1–5	Colombia; W 5–1	3rd place, bronze medalist(s)
Kurtis Ng; Janna Hawash	Mixed team recurve	1258	4 Q	—N/a	Chile; W 6–0	Colombia; L 2–6	Did not advance		

== Artistic swimming ==
Canada Artistic Swimming named four swimmers (one man and three women) to the team on August 7, 2025.

Athlete	Event	Technical Routine		Free Routine (Final)			
Athlete	Event	Points	Rank	Points	Rank	Total Points	Rank
Charlie Breault; Olena Verbinska	Women's duet	261.8517	2	234.3188	3	496.1705	2nd place, silver medalist(s)
Nathan Zhang; Isabelle Koptie	Mixed duet	156.3733	4	208.5162	4	364.8895	4

== Athletics ==
The sport of athletics was given a total of 20 quota spots by the Canadian Olympic Committee. The team of 20 athletes (eight men and 12 women) was officially named on May 6, 2025. This marked the first time the country competed in the sport after missing the inaugural edition in 2021. The team was updated on July 21, 2025 with Matti Erickson and Will Floyd being replaced by Shamiso Sikaneta and Michael Scherk on the men's side. On the women's side Hailey Reid, Chloe Thomas and Julia Tunks were replaced by Arienne Birch and Tricia Madourie. This dropped the team to 19 athletes (eight men and 11 women).

Key

- Note–Ranks given for track events are for the entire round
- Q = Qualified for the next round
- q = Qualified for the next round as a fastest loser
- GR = Games record

Men
Track events

Athlete	Event	Semifinals		Final	
Athlete	Event	Result	Rank	Result	Rank
John O'Reilly	800 m	1:50.81	4 Q	1:49.12	2nd place, silver medalist(s)
Shamiso Sikaneta	800 m	DQ		Did not advance	
Émile Toupin	1500 m	—N/a		3:45.29	2nd place, silver medalist(s)
Jude Wheeler-Dee	1500 m	—N/a		3:45.08	1st place, gold medalist(s)
Michael Scherk	110 m hurdles	14.26	8 q	14.07	6

Field events

Athlete	Event	Final	
Athlete	Event	Distance	Position
Divine Aniamaka	Triple jump	16.27	5
Praise Aniamaka	Triple jump	16.94 GR	1st place, gold medalist(s)
Jeremiah Nubbe	Hammer thow	70.49	2nd place, silver medalist(s)

Women
Track events

Athlete	Event	Semifinals		Final	
Athlete	Event	Result	Rank	Result	Rank
Emily Martin	200 m	23.81	6 Q	23.48	4
Ella Clayton	400 m	54.51	6 q	55.19	6
Dianna Proctor	400 m	53.29	3 Q	51.97 GR	1st place, gold medalist(s)
Avery Pearson	800 m	—N/a		2:06.09	2nd place, silver medalist(s)
Jayden Keeler	5000 m	—N/a		15:56.77	2nd place, silver medalist(s)
Jayden Keeler	10,000 m	—N/a		34:16.61 GR	1st place, gold medalist(s)
Emily Martin; Izzy Goudros; Dianna Proctor; Avery Pearson	4 × 400 m relay	—N/a		3:31.73 GR	1st place, gold medalist(s)

Field events

Athlete	Event	Final	
Athlete	Event	Distance	Position
Arienne Birch	High jump	1.65	9
Tricia Madourie	High jump	1.82	3rd place, bronze medalist(s)
Heather Abadie	Pole vault	4.00	2nd place, silver medalist(s)
Jennifer Elizarov	Pole vault	4.45 GR	1st place, gold medalist(s)
Liv Sands	Shot put	16.46	2nd place, silver medalist(s)

Combined events – Heptathlon

Athlete	Event	100H	HJ	SP	200 m	LJ	JT	800 m	Total	Rank
Izzy Goudros	Result	13.62	1.60	9.90	23.75	6.17	30.31	2:15.93	5561	1st place, gold medalist(s)
Izzy Goudros	Points	1033	736	523	1005	902	482	880	5561	1st place, gold medalist(s)

== Badminton ==
Badminton Canada was provided a quota of two athletes (one per gender) for the games. The two athlete's names were known after the draw was made.

Athlete	Event	Round of 32	Round of 16	Quarterfinals	Semifinals	Final	Rank
Athlete	Event	Opposition Result	Opposition Result	Opposition Result	Opposition Result	Opposition Result	Rank
Victor Lai	Men's singles	Acha (PAR); W 2–0 (21–3, 21–6)	Chilan (ECU); W 2–0 (21–7, 21–2)	Silva (BRA); W 2–0 (21–9, 21–9)	Xu (USA); W 2–0 (21–6, 21–4)	Silva (BRA); W 2–0 (21–6, 23–21)	1st place, gold medalist(s)
Rachel Chan	Women's singles	Rojas (VEN); W 2–0 (21–7, 21–6)	Bisnott (JAM); W 2–0 (21–3, 21–4)	Chang (USA); W 2–0 (21–16, 21–15)	García (MEX); W 2–0 (21–8, 21–11)	Vieira (BRA); W 2–0 (21–12, 21–16)	1st place, gold medalist(s)
Victor Lai; Rachel Chan	Mixed doubles	Waddell / Beharry (GUY); W WD	Silva / Garcia (VEN); W 2–0 (21–7, 21–10)	Del Cid / Barrios (GUA); W 2–0 (21–7, 21–7)	Zhang / Chang (USA); W 2–1 (22–24, 21–12, 21–6)	Silva / Vieira (BRA); L 1–2 (21–23, 21–14, 19–21)	2nd place, silver medalist(s)

== Beach volleyball ==
Canada qualified a men's and women's pair (four athletes in total). The team was officially named on August 7, 2025.

Men

- David Chaput
- Cameron McGregor

Women

- Jaeya Brach
- Sophia Hladyniuk

== Canoeing ==
Canoe Kayak Canada named a team of three athletes (one man and two women) to the team on July 16, 2025.

Athlete	Event	Heat		Semifinal		Final	
Athlete	Event	Time	Rank	Time	Rank	Time	Rank
Elizabeth Desrosiers	Women's C-1 200 m	52.10	1 F	Bye		50.07	2nd place, silver medalist(s)
Elizabeth Desrosiers	Women's C-1 500 m	2:23.88	2 F	Bye		2:19.55	4
Jérémy Lantz	Men's K-1 500 m	1:44.77	3 SF	1:49.68	1 F	1:49.23	7
Jérémy Lantz	Men's K-1 1000 m	4:07.79	1 F	Bye		3:56.88	3rd place, bronze medalist(s)
Brianna Smith	Women's K-1 200 m	52.13	4 SF	51.12	3 F	DNS	
Brianna Smith	Women's K-1 500 m	2:04.02	4 SF	2:05.55	2 F	2:08.15	8
Jérémy Lantz; Brianna Smith	Mixed K-2 500 m	1:44.77	2 F	Bye		2:05.41	2nd place, silver medalist(s)

== Diving ==
Diving Canada named six divers (three per gender) to the team on August 7, 2025.

Men

Athlete	Event	Preliminaries		Final	
Athlete	Event	Points	Rank	Points	Rank
Carson Paul	1 m springboard	339.85	4 Q	338.40	7
Carson Paul	3 m springboard	388.05	1 Q	403.75	3rd place, bronze medalist(s)
Matt Cullen	10 m platform	437.15	2 Q	438.40	4
Benjamin Tessier	10 m platform	379.65	6 Q	463.40	2nd place, silver medalist(s)
Matt Cullen; Benjamin Tessier	10 m synchro platform	—N/a		413.46	1st place, gold medalist(s)

Women

Athlete	Event	Preliminaries		Final	
Athlete	Event	Points	Rank	Points	Rank
Amélie‑Laura Jasmin	1 m springboard	243.75	3 Q	231.15	7
Amélie‑Laura Jasmin	3 m springboard	234.60	5 Q	278.50	4
Katelyn Fung	10 m platform	282.60	5 Q	311.10	3rd place, bronze medalist(s)
Kate Miller	10 m platform	236.60	8 Q	279.05	7
Katelyn Fung; Kate Miller	10 m synchro platform	—N/a		289.05	1st place, gold medalist(s)

== Field hockey ==
Canada qualified a men's and women's team of 16 athletes each (32 athletes in total).

Key:

- P – Match decided by penalty-shootout.

Summary

Team	Event	Group stage				Semifinal	Final / BM / Pl.	
Team	Event	Opposition Result	Opposition Result	Opposition Result	Rank	Opposition Result	Opposition Result	Rank
Canada U-21 men's	Men's tournament	Mexico; L 3–4	Chile; W 2–0	Trinidad and Tobago; W 6–1	1 Q	United States; W 1–0	Argentina; L 2–4	2nd place, silver medalist(s)
Canada U-21 women's	Women's tournament	Paraguay; W 2–0	Argentina; L 0–6	Uruguay; L 0–2	3	Fifth to eighth place classification Guyana; W 4–0	Fifth and sixth place Mexico; Cancelled	=5

=== Men's tournament ===
The Canadian men's team qualified after placing in the top five of the 2024 Men's Junior Pan American Championship in Surrey, British Columbia.

Roster

The men's team of 16 athletes was officially named on July 18, 2025.

- Brooklyn Aranha
- Parmveer Basra
- Gurwinder Brar
- Josiah Campbell
- Christopher Chalut
- Navdip Chandi
- Leighton De Souza
- Satpreet Dhadda
- Caleb Fitch
- Morgan Garside
- Ravpreet Gill
- Kirin Robinson
- Sawyer Ross
- Harjas Sanghera
- Kale Simonson
- Grant Simpson

Pool B

Pos	Team	Pld	W	D	L	GF	GA	GD	Pts	Qualification
1	Canada	3	2	0	1	11	5	+6	6	Semi-finals
2	Chile	3	2	0	1	7	3	+4	6	Semi-finals
3	Mexico	3	1	0	2	5	8	−3	3	
4	Trinidad and Tobago	3	1	0	2	4	11	−7	3	

Source: FIH
Rules for classification: 1) points; 2) matches won; 3) goal difference; 4) goals for; 5) head-to-head result; 6) field goals for.

10 August 2025
09:30

Canada	3–4	Mexico
De Souza 19'; Simonson 20'; Campbell 47'	Report	Francis 3'; Cuate 21'; Rodríguez 50'; Santillan 54'

Umpires:
Basilio Canale (ARG)
Kevin George (TTO)

12 August 2025
11:30

Chile	0–2	Canada
	Report	Robinson 19'; Simonson 39'

Umpires:
Kevin George (TTO)
Brian Tyson (USA)

14 August 2025
09:30

Canada	6–1	Trinidad and Tobago
Robinson 8', 19'; Ross 13'; Dhadda 20'; Chandi 43'; De Souza 58'	Report	Adamson 40'

Umpires:
Fabian Romero (PAR)
Adrian Cross (JAM)

Semi-finals

16 August 2025
19:45

United States	0–1	Canada
	Report	Dhadda 57'

Umpires:
Alberto Chamorro (PAR)
Fabian Romero (PAR)

Gold medal match

18 August 2025
19:45

Argentina	4–2	Canada
Torrigiani 14'; T. Ruiz 27'; Rodríguez 36'; Correa 45'	Report	De Souza 53', 60'

Umpires:
Kevin George (TTO)
Ricardo Albertz (CHI)

=== Women's tournament ===
The Canadian women's team qualified after placing in the top five of the 2024 Women's Junior Pan American Championship in Surrey, British Columbia.

Roster

The women's team of 16 athletes was officially named on July 18, 2025.

- Olive Bodel
- Mackenna Brown
- Wynn Brown
- Robyn Goh
- Prabnoor Hundal
- Madison Hunter
- Maia Lawrence
- Sydney Le
- Sadie Lee
- Kate Martin
- Rylie Novak
- Kaitlyn Pennefather
- Elise Piper
- Shannon Stelling
- Rebecca Stone
- Ava Winter

Pool A

Pos	Team	Pld	W	D	L	GF	GA	GD	Pts	Qualification
1	Argentina	3	3	0	0	21	0	+21	9	Semi-finals
2	Uruguay	3	2	0	1	5	3	+2	6	Semi-finals
3	Canada	3	1	0	2	2	9	−7	3	
4	Paraguay (H)	3	0	0	3	0	16	−16	0	

Source: FIH
Rules for classification: 1) points; 2) matches won; 3) goal difference; 4) goals for; 5) head-to-head result; 6) field goals for.
(H) Hosts

11 August 2025
19:30

Canada	2–0	Paraguay
Hundal 27'; Novak 58'	Report

Umpires:
Marisa Miro (PUR)
Erika Barbera (USA)

13 August 2025
17:30

Canada	0–6	Argentina
	Report	Guignet 12'; Alastra 25', 26', 47'; P. Pisthón 38', 51'

Umpires:
Sofia Aleman (URU)
Erika Barbera (USA)

15 August 2025
17:30

Uruguay	3–0	Canada
Ch. Curcio 29'; Ca. Curcio 38'; Bonaudi 58'	Report

Umpires:
Victoria Pazos (PAR)
Marisa MIRO (PUR)

Cross-overs

17 August 2025
09:30

Canada	4–0	Guyana
Novak 12'; Hundal 15'; Piper 19'; Le 44'	Report

Umpires:
Ricardo Albertz (CHI)
Catalina Wenzel (CHI)

Fifth and sixth place

19 August 2025
11:45

Canada	Cancelled (Note: Extreme weather conditions the Women’s 5/6 Place Match scheduled for today is cancelled.)	Mexico
	Report

Umpires:
Gaston Folcher (ARG)
Catalina Wenzel (CHI)

== Gymnastics ==
Canada entered 12 gymnast (six per gender).

=== Artistic ===
Canada qualified a maximum team of eight athletes (four per gender).

Men

- Aiden Gonzalez
- Thomas Tittley
- Keita Kuramoto
- Parker Smith

Women

- Coralie Demers
- Maryam Saber
- Samantha Couture
- Stella Letendre

=== Trampoline ===
Canada qualified a maximum team of four athletes (four per gender).

Athlete	Event	Qualification		Final	
Athlete	Event	Score	Rank	Score	Rank
Cody Cyman	Men's individual	100.49	6 Q	55.31	4
Étienne Cloutier	Men's individual	103.16	3 Q	54.93	6
Cody Cyman; Étienne Cloutier	Men's synchronized	45.06	3 Q	48.11	2nd place, silver medalist(s)
Rielle Bonne	Women's individual	94.01	6 Q	51.78	4
Mélina Corriveau	Women's individual	94.61	5 Q	51.47	5
Rielle Bonne; Mélina Corriveau	Women's synchronized	19.44	5 Q	47.60	1st place, gold medalist(s)

== Judo ==
Judo Canada named six judoka (two men and four women) to the team on August 7, 2025.

Men

- Arthur Karpukov
- John Jr Messé À Bessong

Women

- Alisa Kofman
- Addy Tamura
- Charlie Thibault
- Carla Van Zyl

== Karate ==
Canada's Karate team consisted of six karateka (two men and four women). Canada originally qualified five karateka (one man and four women). The team was officially named on July 30, 2025, with an additional male athlete being named to the team (Louis-Félix Deschamps).

Men

- Lê Vinh Bricteaux
- Louis-Félix Deschamps

Women

- Ella Crowle
- Melody Monfiston
- Maria Ouyahia
- Victoria Tam

== Rowing ==
Canada qualified eleven rowers (two men and nine women). The team was named on July 31, 2025.

Men

Athlete	Event	Heat		Repechage		Final A/B	
Athlete	Event	Time	Rank	Time	Rank	Time	Rank
Oliver Baker	Single sculls	7:35.58	5 R	7:35.58	2 FA	7:22.44	5
Oliver Baker; Kyland Mels	Double sculls	7:10.27	2 R	6:50.59	4 FA	6:35.04	4

Women

Athlete	Event	Heat		Repechage		Final A/B	
Athlete	Event	Time	Rank	Time	Rank	Time	Rank
Tess Friar; Jalyn Mowry	Double sculls	7:41.49	1 FA	Bye		7:41.49	3rd place, bronze medalist(s)
Ella McKinley; Riley Richardson	Pair	—N/a				7:34.63	3rd place, bronze medalist(s)
Ella McKinley; Riley Richardson; Firinne Rolfe; Alessandra Tuttle	Four	—N/a				6:48.74	3rd place, bronze medalist(s)
Tess Friar; Annika Goodwyn; Ella McKinley; Jalyn Mowry; Riley Richardson; Firinne Rolfe; Alessandra Tuttle; Maylie Valiquette; Teija Patryc	Eight	—N/a				6:27.64	2nd place, silver medalist(s)

Qualification Legend: FA=Final A (medal); FB=Final B (non-medal); R=Repechage

== Rugby sevens ==
=== Women's tournament ===
Canada qualified a women's team of 12 athletes.

Roster

The women's team of 12 athletes was officially named on July 21, 2025.

- Bomi Lawal
- Kiki Idowu
- Sarah Schonfeld
- Olivia Newsome
- Adia Pye
- Zina Umeh
- Ivy Poetker
- Kennedi Stevenson
- Adelaide Holmes
- Charlotte Hilton
- Elle Douglas
- Kelsa Kempf

== Sailing ==
Canada qualified three sailors (two men and one woman). Both dinghy boats qualified, meanwhile the men's kite quota was through a universality place. The team was officially named on July 28, 2025.

Athlete	Event	Race					Total	
Athlete	Event	1	2	3	4	5	Net points	Rank
James Huynh	Men's formula kite	~~3~~	2	2	3	—N/a	7	3rd place, bronze medalist(s)
Reilly Nakatsu	Men's ILCA 7	~~13~~	8	5	8	8	29	8
Annie Balasubramanian	Women's ILCA 6	1	5	~~7~~	3	7	16	6

== Shooting ==
Two shooters (one of each gender) was named to the team on August 7, 2025.

Athlete	Event	Qualification		Final	
Athlete	Event	Points	Rank	Points	Rank
Rex Liu	Men's 10 m air rifle	616.1	5 Q	182.2	5
Emily Yang	Women's 10 m air rifle	619.0	5 Q	203.7	4
Rex Liu; Emily Yang	Mixed pairs air rifle	616.5	7	Did not advance	

== Table tennis ==
Canada qualified the maximum team of four athletes (two per gender). The team was officially named on July 2, 2025.

Men

- Laurent Jutras-Vigneault
- Kenny Ly

Women

- Natalie Chan
- Jessie Xu

== Taekwondo ==
Two taekwondo practitioners (two women) were named to the team on August 7, 2025.

Kyorugi

Women

Athlete	Event	Quarterfinals	Semifinals	Final / BM	
Athlete	Event	Opposition Result	Opposition Result	Opposition Result	Rank
Maude Ricard	49 kg	Areco (PAR); W 2–1	Grippoli (URU); L 0–2	Bronze medal final Way (GUA); L 1–2	5
Gabrielle Beaulieu	67 kg	Escalante (HON); W 2–0	Ramírez (MEX); W 1–0	Caicedo (ECU); W 2–1	1st place, gold medalist(s)

== Triathlon ==
Four triathletes (two per gender) were named to the team on August 7, 2025.

Men

- Daniel Epp
- Blake Harris

Women

- Sidney Clement
- Molly Lakustiak

== Water skiing ==
Six water skiers/wakeboarders (three per gender) were named to the team on August 7, 2025.

Men

- Jakob Taylor – Wakeboard
- Jacob Chambers
- Charlie Ross

Women

- Baye Hoctor-Duncan – Wakeboard
- Kate Pinsonneault
- Hannah Stopnicki

== Weightlifting ==
Four weightlifters (two per gender) were named to the team on August 7, 2025.

Athlete	Event	Snatch		Clean & Jerk		Total	
Athlete	Event	Result	Rank	Result	Rank	Result	Rank
Thomas Pilotte	Men's 71 kg	114	5	150	=2	264	5
Dryden Parchewsky	Men's 88 kg	134	7	155	7	289	7
Charlotte Simoneau	Women's 69 kg	110	1	130	1	240 GR	1st place, gold medalist(s)
Rose Beaudoin	Women's 77 kg	NM		DNF			

== Wrestling ==
Wrestling Canada Lutte was given a quota of four spots (two men and two women) by the Canadian Olympic Committee. The athletes were selected using results of the 2025 Canadian U-23 championships. The team was officially named on July 22, 2025.

Men

- Javier Tonita-Charriez - 57 kg
- Jorawar Dhinsa - 125 kg

Women

- Serena Di Benedetto - 53 kg
- Mia Friesen - 57 kg

== Non-competing Sports & Events ==
Cycling

Cycling Canada declined all 13 quota spots earned in track cycling, four in BMX racing, four in mountain biking and two in BMX freestyle.

Fencing

Through the qualification system, Canada qualified a full team, but did not enter any fencers.

Golf

Through the qualification system, Canada qualified a full team, but did not enter any golfers.

Gymnastics - Rhythmic

Gymnastics Canada did not name any rhythmic gymnasts to the team, however did name athletes in the other two disciplines (artistic and trampoline).

Rugby sevens

Rugby Canada's announcement excluded the mention of the men's team competing. The men's team had qualified automatically for the event.

Squash

Canada competed in the inaugural edition in 2021, but did not enter athletes here.

Swimming

Canada did not enter any swimmers.

== See also ==
- 2025 Canada Summer Games
