= Chile at the 2025 Junior Pan American Games =

- IOC code: CHI
- NOC: Chilean Olympic Committee
- Website: www.coch.cl

in Asunción, Paraguay 9 August 2025 – 23 August 2025
- Competitors: 281 in 27 sports
- Flag bearers: Laura Müller and Rodrigo Paz
- Medals Ranked 8th: Gold 18 Silver 19 Bronze 28 Total 65

Junior Pan American Games appearances (overview)
- 2021; 2025

Chile is competing at the 2025 Junior Pan American Games in Asunción, Paraguay, from 9 to 23 August 2025.

The flag bearers for the opening ceremony will be field hockey player Laura Müller and rower Rodrigo Paz.

== Competitors ==
The following is the list of number of competitors participating at the Games per sport/discipline.

Sport	Men	Women	Total
Archery	2	2	4
Artistic swimming	–	–	9
Athletics	20	6	24
Badminton	1	1	2
Basketball	4	4	8
Beach volleyball	2	2	4
Canoeing	6	6	12
Cycling	12	14	26
Fencing	3	3	6
Field hockey	16	16	32
Gymnastics	5	9	14
Golf	2	2	4
Handball	14	14	28
Judo	4	2	6
Karate	2	2	4
Roller sports	6	6	12
Rowing	8	8	16
Rugby sevens	12	–	12
Sailing	1	1	2
Shooting	6	2	8
Squash	–	3	3
Swimming	6	2	8
Taekwondo	2	–	2
Tennis	2	3	5
Triathlon	2	2	4
Volleyball	–	12	12
Water skiing	2	4	6
Weightlifting	2	2	4
Wrestling	1	1	2
Total	140	141	281

== Medalists ==
The following Chilean competitors won medals at the games.

Medal	Name	Sport	Event	Date
Gold	Diego Parra	Shooting	Men's 10 metre air pistol	August 10
Gold	Raimundo Roche	Shooting	Men's skeet	August 10
Gold	Pedro Labatut; Rodrigo Paz	Rowing	Men's coxless pair	August 10
Gold	Martín Arcos; Vicente de Jongz; Pedro Labatut; Bastián López; Benjamín Menjiba; Rodrigo Paz; Benito Rosas; Ignacio Wilson; Damián Araya	Rowing	Men's eight	August 10
Gold	Rafaela Santibáñez	Fencing	Women's individual foil	August 11
Gold	Pedro Labatut; Rodrigo Paz; Bastián López; Benjamín Menjiba	Rowing	Men's coxless four	August 11
Gold	Camila Cofré; Emilia Liewald; Emilia Rosas; Emily Serandour	Rowing	Women's coxless four	August 10
Gold	Diego Rojas; Martín Mancilla; Josafat Cárdenas; Raimundo Carvajal	Cycling	Men's team pursuit	August 12
Gold	Camila Cofré; Emilia Liewald	Rowing	Women's coxless pair	August 12
Gold	Camila Cofré; Emilia Liewald; Emilia Rosas; Emily Serandour; Amanda Araneda; Felipa Rosas; Josefa Ceballos; Antonia Pichott; Antonia Liewald	Rowing	Women's eight	August 12
Gold	Javiera Garrido; Maite Ibarra; Marlén Rojas; Martina Rojas	Cycling	Women's team pursuit	August 12
Gold	Felipa Rosas; Antonia Liewald; Amanda Araneda; Antonia Pichott	Rowing	Women's quadruple sculls	August 13
Gold	Camila Cofré; Emilia Liewald; Emily Serandour; Josefa Ceballos; Pedro Labatut; Bastián López; Rodrigo Paz; Benjamín Menjiba; Antonia Liewald	Rowing	Mixed eight	August 13
Gold	Cristián Olivero	Taekwondo	Men's 68 kg	August 15
Gold	Sebastián Alveal	Canoeing	Men's K-1 1000 metres	August 20
Gold	Emilia Méndez	Water skiing	Women's slalom	August 20
Gold	Sebastián Alveal	Canoeing	Men's K-1 500 metres	August 21
Gold	Maira Toro	Canoeing	Women's K-1 500 metres	August 21
Silver	Martín Arcos; Benito Rosas	Rowing	Men's double sculls	August 10
Silver	Filipa Rosas	Rowing	Women's single sculls	August 10
Silver	Kharla Casas	Judo	Women's +78 kg	August 12
Silver	Felipa Rosas; Antonia Liewald	Rowing	Women's double sculls	August 10
Silver	Eduardo Cisternas	Swimming	Men's 400 metre freestyle	August 14
Silver	Eduardo Cisternas	Swimming	Men's 200 metre freestyle	August 13
Silver	Diego Rojas	Cycling	Men's omnium	August 15
Silver	Javiera Garrido; Marlén Rojas	Cycling	Women's madison	August 15
Silver	Gabriel Soto; Juan Aguayo; Oscar Barría; Vicente Schulz	3x3 basketball	Men's tournament	August 17
Silver	Camila Carreño	Speed skating	Women's 5000 metres points race	August 20
Silver	Matías González	Water skiing	Men's tricks	August 20
Silver	Daniela Kretschmer	Water skiing	Women's slalom	August 20
Silver	Emilia Méndez	Water skiing	Women's jump	August 20
Silver	Maira Toro	Canoeing	Women's K-1 200 metres	August 21
Silver	Maira Toro; Fernanda Sepúlveda	Canoeing	Women's K-2 500 metres	August 21
Silver	Arturo Rossell	Gymnastics	Men's floor	August 21
Silver	Matías Martínez	Gymnastics	Men's pommel horse	August 21
Silver	Theodora Garrido; Nicolás Campos	Artistic swimming	Mixed duet	August 22
Silver	Sley Figueroa; Matías Jiménez	Canoeing	Mixed C-2 500 metres	August 23
Bronze	José Aguilera	Shooting	Men's 10 metre air pistol	August 10
Bronze	Rodrigo Moyano	Shooting	Men's skeet	August 10
Bronze	Edhy Vargas	Swimming	Men's 200 metre backstroke	August 11
Bronze	Catalina Henríquez	Cycling	Women's BMX freestyle	August 11
Bronze	Mariano Lazzerini	Swimming	Men's 200 metre breaststroke	August 13
Bronze	Martín Arcos; Vicente de Jong; Benito Rosas; Ignacio Wilson	Rowing	Men's quadruple sculls	August 13
Bronze	Eduardo Cisternas; Mariano Lazzerini; Edhy Vargas; Elías Ardiles	Swimming	Men's 4 × 200 metre freestyle relay	August 13
Bronze	Tomás Hernández	Judo	Men's -73 kg	August 13
Bronze	Marko Figueroa	Judo	Men's -100 kg	August 13
Bronze	Javiera Garrido	Cycling	Women's omnium	August 15
Bronze	Chile men's U21 rugby sevens team: Rodrigo Araya; Claudio Roa; Tomás Queirolo; Lucas Pizarro; Mateo Alcaide; Martín Cura; Dimitri Simonidis; Lukas Winkler; Santiago Wood; José Bonilla; Marco Alvano; Nicolás Saab	Rugby sevens	Men's tournament	August 17
Bronze	Chile men's U21 field hockey team: Bruno Acevedo; Gaspar Carvajal; Felipé Duisberg; Ignacio Fariña; Gaspar Fosalba; Tomás Hasson; Sebastian Loehnert; Lucas Luders; Santiago Pizarro; Felipé Richard; Axel Stein; Tomás Taborga; León Taladriz; Nicolás Troncoso; Javier Vargas; Vicente Wilhelmy	Field hockey	Men's tournament	August 18
Bronze	Catalina Lorca	Speed skating	Women's 1000 metres sprint	August 20
Bronze	Andree Buc	Triathlon	Men's	August 20
Bronze	Benjamín Riquelme	Weightlifting	Men's 71 kg	August 20
Bronze	Chile women's U21 field hockey team: Montserrat Araya; Trinidad Barrios; Victoria Arrieta; Florencia Barrios; Isidora Caravia; Camila González; Josefina Gutiérrez; Josefa Luders; Sofía Messen; Laura Müller; Maite Parada; Dominga Pérez; Catalina Rojas; Javiera Sáenz; Laura Salamanca; Jacinta Solari	Field hockey	Women's tournament	August 19
Bronze	Max Moraga	Athletics	Men's decathlon	August 19
Bronze	Benjamín Muñoz	Athletics	Men's hammer throw	August 20
Bronze	Gabriel Reyes	Speed skating	Men's 10,000 metres elimination race	August 20
Bronze	Camila Carreño	Speed skating	Women's 10,000 metres elimination race	August 20
Bronze	Gabriel Reyes	Speed skating	Men's 5000 metres points race	August 20
Bronze	Franchesca Muñoz	Karate	Women's +68 kg	August 21
Bronze	Sebastián Alveal; Matteo Cossio	Canoeing	Men's K-2 500 metres	August 22
Bronze	Josefa Ramos	Artistic skating	Women's freestyle	August 22
Bronze	Sebastián Alveal; Maira Toro	Canoeing	Mixed K-2 500 metres	August 23
Bronze	Jerson Valenzuela; Matías Parra; Sebastián Alveal; Matteo Cossio	Canoeing	Men's K-4 500 metres	August 21
Bronze	Sley Figueroa; Valentina Cornejo	Canoeing	Women's C-2 500 metres	August 21
Bronze	Dominga Cerda; Dominga Césped; Bárbara Coppelli; Theodora Garrido; Josefa Oravec; Chloé Plaut Dekock; Eva Rubio Mella; Macarena Vial; Nicolás Campos	Artistic swimming	Team	August 23

== Archery ==
Chile qualified a team of four archers (two men and two women).

Men

Athlete	Event	Ranking Round		Round of 32	Round of 16	Quarterfinals	Semifinals	Final / BM	Rank
Athlete	Event	Score	Seed	Opposition Score	Opposition Score	Opposition Score	Opposition Score	Opposition Score	Rank
Agustín Contreras	Individual recurve	640	7	—N/a	Silva (ARG); L 0–6	Did not advance			
Agustín Infante	Individual compound	689	2	—N/a		Neilson (USA); L 145–146	Did not advance		

Women

Athlete	Event	Ranking Round		Round of 32	Round of 16	Quarterfinals	Semifinals	Final / BM	Rank
Athlete	Event	Score	Seed	Opposition Score	Opposition Score	Opposition Score	Opposition Score	Opposition Score	Rank
Aixa Catalán	Individual recurve	495	20	Sánchez (ECU); W 6–0	Hawash (CAN); L 3–7	Did not advance			
Aurora Olea	Individual compound	677	4	—N/a		Rodrigo (ECU); L 140–143	Did not advance		

== Artistic swimming ==
Chile qualified a full team of 9 artistic swimmers after finishing second in the competition in the 2025 Pan American Aquatics Championships.

Athlete	Event	Technical Routine		Free Routine		Acrobatic Routine		Total	
Athlete	Event	Points	Rank	Points	Rank	Points	Rank	Points	Rank
Bárbara Coppelli; Macarena Vial	Women's duet	237.6775	4	218.0417	4	—N/a		455.7192	4
Theodora Garrido; Nicolás Campos	Mixed duet	180.4883	2	254.8896	2	—N/a		435.3779	2nd place, silver medalist(s)
Dominga Cerda; Dominga Césped; Bárbara Coppelli; Theodora Garrido; Josefa Oravec; Chloé Plaut; Eva Rubio; Macarena Vial; Nicolás Campos	Team	229.6350	3	244.6411	3	159.7715	3	634.0476	3rd place, bronze medalist(s)

== Athletics ==
On June 13, 2025, the Chilean Athletics Federation announced the pool team of 20 athletes (16 men and 4 women). Later, four other athletes were included, increasing the number of Chilean athletes to 24 (18 men and 6 women).

Key

- Note–Ranks given for track events are within the athlete's heat only
- Q = Qualified for the next round
- q = Qualified for the next round as a fastest loser
- Bye = Athlete not required to compete in round

Men

Track & road events

Athlete	Event	Semifinal		Final	
Athlete	Event	Result	Rank	Result	Rank
Ramón Fuenzalida	400 m	50.76	6 Q	51.23	7
Klaus Scholz	800 m	1:49.89	3 Q	1:51.11	6
Lucas Jara	800 m	1:52.32	7 q	1:51.27	7
Brayan Jara	1500 m	—N/a		3:50.66	7
Ignacio Carrizo	10000 m	—N/a		31:37.7	6
Matías Ubeda	10000 m	—N/a		Did not finish	
Emilio Reyes	110 m hurdles	14.33	9	Did not advance	
Julio Espinoza	3000 m steeplechase	—N/a		10:21.24	12

Field events

Athlete	Event	Final	
Athlete	Event	Distance	Position
Leonardo Olate	Pole jump	4.80	6
Cristóbal Sahurie	High jump	2.07	5
Domingo Lorenzini	High jump	2.07	4
Camilo Rojas	Discus throw	49.20	11
Miguel Castro	Hammer throw	66.53	4
Benjamín Muñoz	Hammer throw	67.04	3rd place, bronze medalist(s)

Combined events – Decathlon

Athlete	Event	100 m	LJ	SP	HJ	400 m	110H	DT	PV	JT	1500 m	Final	Rank
Max Moraga	Result	11.01	7.21	11.58	1.85	47.77	15.50	39.75	4.00	57.02	4:44.50	7304	3rd place, bronze medalist(s)

Women

Track & road events

Athlete	Event	Semifinal		Final	
Athlete	Event	Result	Rank	Result	Rank
Antonia Ramírez	200 m	24.70	10	Did not advance	
Matilde Ruiz	1500 m	—N/a		4:35.29	9
Francisca Urra	5000 m	—N/a		18:09.08	12
Francisca Urra	10000 m	—N/a		37:51.47	6
Tamara Villegas	10000 m	—N/a		36:25.24	4
Catalina Arellano	100 m hurdles	13.57	7 q	13.96	6

Field events

Athlete	Event	Final	
Athlete	Event	Distance	Position
Javiera Moraga	Pole jump	3.70	10
Matilde Tejos	Triple jump	11.75	9
Mariela Pérez	Shot put	15.47	4

== Badminton ==
Chile qualified two badminton players (a man and woman).

Athlete	Event	First round	Second round	Quarterfinals	Semifinals	Final / BM	
Athlete	Event	Opposition Result	Opposition Result	Opposition Result	Opposition Result	Opposition Result	Rank
Sebastián Vásquez	Men's singles	Bencomo (CUB); L 0–2	Did not advance				
Vania Díaz	Women's singles	Mustafaa (JAM); W 2–0	García (VEN); L 0–2	Did not advance			
Sebastián Vásquez; Vania Díaz	Mixed doubles	Oliva / Liotini (ARG); L 0–2	Did not advance				

== 3x3 basketball ==
Chile qualified a men's and women's team of 4 athletes each (8 athletes in total).

Summary

Team	Event	Preliminary round			Quarterfinal	Semifinal	Final / BM / Pl.	
Team	Event	Opposition Result	Opposition Result	Rank	Opposition Result	Opposition Result	Opposition Result	Rank
Chile men's	Men's tournament	Ecuador; W 19–17	Trinidad and Tobago; W 21–11	1	Canada; W 21–16	Dominican Republic; W 18–16	Argentina; L 11–21	2nd place, silver medalist(s)
Chile women's	Women's tournament	Uruguay; W 20–14	El Salvador; W 19–7	1	Brazil; L 18–19	5-8th place match Costa Rica; W 15–8	5th place match Argentina; W 17–13	5

=== Men's tournament ===
Chile qualified a men's team (of 4 athletes).

Roster

- Juan Aguayo
- Ignacio Ansaldo
- Óscar Barría
- Gabriel Soto

=== Women's tournament ===
Chile qualified a women's team (of 4 athletes).

Roster

- Valentina Ojeda
- Josefa Orrego
- Fernanda Ovalle
- Catalina Ramírez

== Beach volleyball ==
Chile qualified a men's and women's pair (four athletes in total).

Athlete	Event	Group stage				Round of 16	Quarterfinal	Semifinal	Final / BM	
Athlete	Event	Opposition Result	Opposition Result	Opposition Result	Rank	Opposition Result	Opposition Result	Opposition Result	Opposition Result	Rank
Fernando Quintero; Martín Etcheberry	Men's tournament	Guardado / Guardado (ESA); L 0–2 (15–21, 20–22)	Cañiza / Vargas (PAR); W 2–0 (21–16, 21–12)	Ward / Bristol (SKN); W 2–0 (21–14, 21–12)	2	Cuadrado / Fernández (URU); L 0–2 (22–24, 12–21)	Did not advance			
Alejandra Dubost; Viviana Urretaviscaya	Women's tournament	Hladyniuk / Dubost (CAN); L 0–2 (14–21, 17–21)	Beleño / Gaviria (COL); W 2–0 (21–15, 21–17)	Tovar / Vigil (ESA); W 2–1 (21–23, 21–15, 15–8)	2	Castillo / Romero (PER); W 0–2 (12–21, 15–21)	Did not advance			

== Canoeing ==
Chile named a team of twelve athletes (six men and six women).

Men

Athlete	Event	Heat		Semifinal		Final	
Athlete	Event	Time	Rank	Time	Rank	Time	Rank
Joaquín Lagos	C–1 500 m	—N/a				1:56.70	4
Matías Jiménez	C–1 1000 m	—N/a				4:26.85	4
Joaquín Lagos; Matías Jiménez	C–2 500 m	—N/a				2:33.18	6
Sebastián Alveal	K–1 500 m	1:43.08	1 F	—N/a		1:42.29	1st place, gold medalist(s)
Sebastián Alveal	K–1 1000 m	3:58.57	1 F	—N/a		3:52.65	1st place, gold medalist(s)
Sebastián Alveal; Matteo Cossio	K–2 500 m	1:38.60	1 F	—N/a		1:49.33	3rd place, bronze medalist(s)
Sebastián Alveal; Matteo Cossio; Matías Parra; Jerson Valenzuela	K–4 500 m	—N/a				1:26.51	3rd place, bronze medalist(s)

Women

Athlete	Event	Heat		Semifinal		Final	
Athlete	Event	Time	Rank	Time	Rank	Time	Rank
Sley Figueroa	C–1 200 m	53.55	3	54.60	1 F	52.61	5
Valentina Cornejo	C–1 500 m	2:25.20	3	2:26.54	1 F	2:28.34	6
Sley Figueroa; Valentina Cornejo	C–2 500 m	—N/a				2:27.33	3rd place, bronze medalist(s)
Maira Toro	K–1 200 m	48.27	2 F	—N/a		45.87	2nd place, silver medalist(s)
Maira Toro	K–1 500 m	2:01.21	1 F	—N/a		2:01.68	1st place, gold medalist(s)
Maira Toro; Fernanda Sepúlveda	K–2 500 m	1:57.72	1 F	—N/a		2:02.79	2nd place, silver medalist(s)
Maira Toro; Fernanda Sepúlveda; Agustina Díaz; Francisca Medina	K–4 500 m	—N/a				1:44.20	4

Mixed

Athlete	Event	Heat		Semifinal		Final	
Athlete	Event	Time	Rank	Time	Rank	Time	Rank
Sley Figueroa; Matías Jiménez	C–2 500 m	—N/a				2:18.75	2nd place, silver medalist(s)
Maira Toro; Sebastián Alveal	K–2 500 m	1:45.35	1 F	—N/a		2:09.66	3rd place, bronze medalist(s)

== Cycling ==
Chile qualified a total of 13 cyclists (six men and seven women).

=== BMX ===
Chile qualified a team of seven BMX riders (three men and four women).

Freestyle

Athlete	Event	Seeding		Final	
Athlete	Event	Score	Rank	Score	Rank
Ismael Arroyo	Men's	63.34	5 Q	25.00	7
Gaspar Becerra	Men's	60.17	6 Q	49.33	5
Catalina Henríquez	Women's	61.67	3 Q	72.67	3rd place, bronze medalist(s)
Antonella Pastene	Women's	27.00	6 Q	33.00	6

Racing

Athlete	Event	Ranking round		Quarterfinal		Semifinal		Final	
Athlete	Event	Time	Rank	Points	Rank	Points	Rank	Time	Rank
Ignacio Aguilera	Men's	36.143	12 Q	13	4 Q	16	6	Did not advance	
Emilia Carrasco	Women's	41.089	10 Q	11	4 Q	15	5	Did not advance	
Valentina Ramírez	Women's	41.728	13 Q	15	5	Did not advance			

=== Mountain biking ===
Brazil qualified four mountain bikers (two men and two women).

Athlete	Event	Time	Rank
Maximiliano San Martín	Men's cross-country	1:22.03	8
Matías Urzúa	Men's cross-country	1:23.29	11
Florencia Monsalvez	Women's cross-country	1:18.58	4
Amalia Medina	Women's cross-country	1:20.35	7

=== Road ===
Brazil qualified eight road cyclists (four men and four women).

Men

Athlete	Event	Time	Rank
Martín Mancilla	Road race	3:23:26	24
Facundo Arias	Road race	3:23:44	37
Vicente Cárdenas	Road race	3:23:26	34
José Trillat	Road race	3:23:26	19
Facundo Arias	Time trial	50:45.33	6

Women

Athlete	Event	Time	Rank
Javiera Garrido	Road race	2:52:02	9
Marlén Rojas	Road race	2:52:02	24
Martina Torres	Road race	2:52:02	25
Amalia Medina	Road race	2:52:02	28
Martina Torres	Time trial	39:49.38	8

=== Track ===
Chile qualified a team of eleven track cyclists (four men and seven women).

Sprint

Athlete	Event	Qualification		Round of 16	Repechage 1	Quarterfinals	Semifinals	Final	
Athlete	Event	Time	Rank	Opposition Time	Opposition Time	Opposition Result	Opposition Result	Opposition Result	Rank
Naharai Neira	Women's individual	11.800	7 Q	Moreno (VEN); L 12.453	Díaz (ARG); Leal (CUB); L	Did not advance			
Kelly Gómez	Women's individual	12.593	13	Did not advance					
Naharai Neira; Kelly Gómez; Constanza Flores	Women's team	53.773	6	—N/a				Did not advance	

Omnium

Athlete	Event	Scratch race	Tempo race		Elimination race	Points race		Total	
Athlete	Event	Rank	Points	Rank	Rank	Points	Rank	Points	Rank
Diego Rojas	Men's	24	32	5	36	48	2	140	2nd place, silver medalist(s)
Javiera Garrido	Women's	38	34	4	38	11	4	121	3rd place, bronze medalist(s)

Keirin

Athlete	Event	Heats	Final
Athlete	Event	Rank	Rank
Naharai Neira	Women's	4	Did not advance
Kelly Gómez	Women's	6	Did not advance

Madison

Athlete	Event	Points	Rank
Diego Rojas; Martín Mancilla	Men's	-4	5
Javiera Garrido; Marlén Rojas	Women's	49	2nd place, silver medalist(s)

Pursuit

Athlete	Event	Qualification		Semifinals	Finals	
Athlete	Event	Time	Rank	Opposition Result	Opposition Result	Rank
Diego Rojas; Martín Mancilla; Josafat Cárdenas; Raimundo Carvajal	Men's team	4:03.878	1 Q	—N/a	Argentina; W 3:00.676–3:05.159	1st place, gold medalist(s)
Javiera Garrido; Maite Ibarra; Marlén Rojas; Martina Rojas	Women's team	4:35.013	1 Q	—N/a	Colombia; W 3:23.531–3:30.275	1st place, gold medalist(s)

== Fencing ==
Chile qualified a full team of six fencers (three men and three women).

Men

Athlete	Event	Round of 16	Quarterfinals	Semifinals	Final	
Athlete	Event	Opposition Score	Opposition Score	Opposition Score	Opposition Score	Rank
Javier Carmona	Individual épée	Martínez (GUA); W 15–10	Schembri (ISV); L 7–15	Did not advance		
Francisco Naranjo	Individual foil	Fumagalli (BRA); W 15–12	Porras (GUA); L 10–15	Did not advance		
Gaspar Latham	Individual sabre	Mattoo (PUR); W 15–11	Lim (USA); L 6–15	Did not advance		

Women

Athlete	Event	Round of 16	Quarterfinals	Semifinals	Final	
Athlete	Event	Opposition Score	Opposition Score	Opposition Score	Opposition Score	Rank
Simone Combatti	Individual épée	Arauz (BOL); W 15–10	Hanspach (PAR); L 8–15	Did not advance		
Rafaela Santibáñez	Individual foil	Sotelo (PAR) w 15–2	Mena (ESA); W 15–2	Machado (VEN); W 15–12	Yang (USA); W 15–10	1st place, gold medalist(s)
Constanza Manso	Individual sabre	Iriarte (BOL); W 15–13	Hwang (PUR); L 0–15	Did not advance		

== Field hockey ==
Chile qualified a men's and women's team of 16 athletes each (32 athletes in total).

Key:

- P – Match decided by penalty-shootout.

Summary

Team	Event	Group stage				Semifinal	Final / BM / Pl.	
Team	Event	Opposition Result	Opposition Result	Opposition Result	Rank	Opposition Result	Opposition Result	Rank
Chile U-21 men	Men's tournament	Trinidad and Tobago; W 4–1	Canada; L 0–2	Mexico; W 3–0	2	Medal round Argentina; L 5–0	Bronze medal match United States; W 4–2	3rd place, bronze medalist(s)
Chile U-21 women	Women's tournament	Guyana; W 12–1	United States; L 0–4	Mexico; W 4–2	2	Medal round Argentina; L 1–4	Bronze medal match Uruguay; W 0(3)-0(2)	3rd place, bronze medalist(s)

=== Men's tournament ===
The Chilean men's team qualified after placing in the top five of the 2024 Men's Junior Pan American Championship in Surrey, British Columbia.

Roster

- Bruno Acevedo
- Gaspar Carvajal
- Felipe Duisberg
- Ignacio Fariña
- Gaspar Fonsalba
- Tomás Hasson
- Juan Kouyoumdjian
- Sebastián Loehnert
- Santiago Pizarro
- Felipe Richard
- Axel Stein
- Tomás Taborga
- León Taladriz
- Nicolás Troncoso
- Javier Vargas
- Vicente Wilhelmy
- Simón Frenk
- Lucas Lüders

Pool B

Pos	Team	Pld	W	D	L	GF	GA	GD	Pts	Qualification
1	Canada	3	2	0	1	11	5	+6	6	Semi-finals
2	Chile	3	2	0	1	7	3	+4	6	Semi-finals
3	Mexico	3	1	0	2	5	8	−3	3	
4	Trinidad and Tobago	3	1	0	2	4	11	−7	3	

Source: FIH
Rules for classification: 1) points; 2) matches won; 3) goal difference; 4) goals for; 5) head-to-head result; 6) field goals for.

10 August 2025
11:30

Chile	4–1	Trinidad and Tobago
Hasson 9', 36'; Fosalba 48'; Vargas 56'	Report	Siu Butt 45'

Umpires:
Pambavasan Manikandan (CAN)
Brian Tyson (USA)

12 August 2025
11:30

Chile	0–2	Canada
	Report	Robinson 19'; Simonson 39'

Umpires:
Kevin George (TTO)
Brian Tyson (USA)

14 August 2025
11:30

Mexico	0–3	Chile
	Report	Duisberg 16'; Vargas 56'; Loehnert 59'

Umpires:
Pambavasan Manikandan (CAN)
Kevin George (TTO)

Semi-finals

16 August 2025
17:30

Argentina	5–0	Chile
Correa 1', 60'; J. Fernández 23'; Rodríguez 25'; Boretti 41'	Report

Umpires:
Brian Tyson (USA)
Pambavasan Manikandan (CAN)

Bronze medal match

18 August 2025
17:30

Chile	4–2	United States
Hasson 8'; Wilhelmy 16'; Vargas 55'; Duisberg 59'	Report	Grewal 33'; Webb 59'

Umpires:
Basilio Canale (ARG)
Adrian Cross (JAM)

=== Women's tournament ===
The Chilean women's team qualified after placing in the top five of the 2024 Women's Junior Pan American Championship in Surrey, British Columbia.

Roster

- Montserrat Araya
- Victoria Arrieta
- Florencia Barrios
- Trinidad Barrios
- Isidora Caravia
- Camila González
- Josefina Gutiérrez
- Josefa Lüders
- Sofía Messen
- Laura Müller
- Dominga Pérez
- Catalina Rojas
- Javiera Sáenz
- Laura Salamanca
- Jacinta Solari
- Francisca Finsterbusch
- Maite Parada

Pool B

Pos	Team	Pld	W	D	L	GF	GA	GD	Pts	Qualification
1	United States	3	3	0	0	23	0	+23	9	Semi-finals
2	Chile	3	2	0	1	16	7	+9	6	Semi-finals
3	Mexico	3	1	0	2	11	13	−2	3	
4	Guyana	3	0	0	3	2	32	−30	0	

Source: FIH
Rules for classification: 1) points; 2) matches won; 3) goal difference; 4) goals for; 5) head-to-head result; 6) field goals for.

11 August 2025
11:30

Chile	12–1	Guyana
J. Gutiérrez 6', 16', 51', 60'; Saenz 9'; Messen 13'; Rojas 15+'; Salamanca 29'; Caravia 32'; C. González 42'; Luders 52'; Barrios 54'	Report	Klautky 44'

Umpires:
Nora Struchtrup (CAN)
Sofia Aleman (URU)

13 August 2025
11:30

Chile	0–4	United States
	Report	McVeigh 4', 6', 46'; Bradford 58'

Umpires:
Victoria Pazos (PAR)
Nora Struchtrup (CAN)

15 August 2025
11:30

Mexico	2–4	Chile
Guzman 14'; Espinoza 29'	Report	Luders 2', 18'; Caravia 30+'; Arrieta 53'

Umpires:
Katelyn Makovec (USA)
Macarena Dieni (ARG)

Semi-finals

17 August 2025
17:30

Argentina	4–1	Chile
Alastra 9', 45', 48'; Castellaro 32'	Report	Solari 30'

Umpires:
Katelyn Makovec (USA)
Erika Barbera (USA)

Bronze medal match

19 August 2025
17:30

Chile	0–0	Uruguay
	Report
Penalties
Sáenz (penalty shoot-out scored); Gutiérrez (penalty shoot-out missed); Messen (penalty shoot-out missed); F. Barrios (penalty shoot-out scored); Parada (penalty shoot-out scored)	3–2	(penalty shoot-out missed) Guerrero; (penalty shoot-out scored) Arregui; (penalty shoot-out scored) Martínez; (penalty shoot-out missed) Rodríguez; (penalty shoot-out missed) Ch. Curcio

Umpires:
Katelyn Makovec (USA)
Erika Barbera (USA)

== Gymnastics ==
Chile qualified a total of 14 gymnasts (five men and nine women).

=== Artistic ===
Chile qualified a team of eight gymnasts in artistic (five men and three women).

Men

Team & Individual Qualification

Athlete	Event	Final							
Athlete	Event	Apparatus						Total	Rank
Athlete	Event	F	PH	R	V	PB	HB	Total	Rank
Agustín Espinoza	Team	12.700; Q	10.100	11.350	13.600; Q	11.300	11.650	—N/a	
Matías Martínez	Team	10.600	12.150; Q	10.800	12.600	9.850	10.500	—N/a	
Arturo Rossel	Team	12.500; Q	10.600	10.950	13.650; Q	11.800	11.500	—N/a	
Nicolás Toro	Team	12.100	11.600	10.300	12.250	11.000	11.050	—N/a	
Total	Team	37.300	34.350	33.100	39.850	34.100	34.200	212.900	6

Qualification Legend: Q = Qualified to apparatus final

Individual Finals

Athlete	Event	Apparatus						Total	
Athlete	Event	F	PH	R	PB	V	HB	Score	Rank
Agustín Espinoza	All-around	12.700	10.100	11.350	13.600	11.300	11.650	70.700	14
Matías Martínez	All-around	10.600	12.150	10.800	12.600	9.850	10.500	66.500	30
Arturo Rossel	All-around	12.500	10.600	10.950	13.650	11.800	11.500	71.100	13
Nicolás Toro	All-around	12.100	11.600	10.300	12.250	11.000	11.050	68.300	26
Arturo Rossel	Floor	12.666	—N/a						2nd place, silver medalist(s)
Agustín Espinoza	Floor	12.233	—N/a						5
Matías Martínez	Pommel horse	—N/a	12.200	—N/a					2nd place, silver medalist(s)
Arturo Rossel	Vault	—N/a				13.166	—N/a		6
Agustín Espinoza	Vault	—N/a				13.299	—N/a		4

Women

Team & Individual Qualification

Athlete	Event	Final					
Athlete	Event	Apparatus				Total	Rank
Athlete	Event	V	UB	BB	F	Total	Rank
Tais Gonçalves	Team	12.000	7.900	9.200	10.300	—N/a	
Maite Morales	Team	12.350	8.400	7.250	10.850	—N/a	
Mayra Pereira	Team	12.250	8.400	8.300	10.150	—N/a	
Total	Team	36.600	26.550	26.850	31.300	121.300	10

Qualification Legend: Q = Qualified to apparatus final

Individual Finals

Athlete	Event	Apparatus				Total	
Athlete	Event	F	BB	V	UB	Score	Rank
Tais Gonçalves	All-around	12.000	7.900	9.200	10.300	39.400	27
Maite Morales	All-around	12.350	8.400	7.250	10.850	38.850	29
Mayra Pereira	All-around	12.250	8.400	8.300	10.150	39.100	28

=== Rhythmic ===
Chile qualified six gymnasts for the rhythmic events.

Individual

Athlete	Event	Apparatus				Total	
Athlete	Event	Ball	Clubs	Hoop	Ribbon	Score	Rank
Dominga Badilla	All-around	19.550	18.900	20.650	20.100	79.200	12
Matilde Trivique	All-around	19.600	18.850	19.250	15.750	73.450	16

Group

Athlete	Event	Apparatus		Total	
Athlete	Event	5 ribbons	3 balls + 2 hoops	Score	Rank
Agustina Clavería; Isidora González; Josefa Muñoz; Matilde Trivique; Leyla Zenteno; Dominga Badilla	All-around	15.600	15.00	30.600	5
Agustina Clavería; Isidora González; Josefa Muñoz; Matilde Trivique; Leyla Zenteno; Dominga Badilla	5 hoops	18.650	—N/a		5
Agustina Clavería; Isidora González; Josefa Muñoz; Matilde Trivique; Leyla Zenteno; Dominga Badilla	10 clubs	—N/a	17.600	—N/a	5

== Golf ==
Chile qualified a full team of four golfers (two men and two women).

Athlete	Event	Round 1	Round 2	Round 3	Total		
Athlete	Event	Score	Score	Score	Score	Par	Rank
Martín Sandoval	Men's individual	77	85	79	230	+14	10
Joaquín Sandoval	Men's individual	76	74	79	240	+24	=21
Constanza Figueroa	Women's individual	84	78	84	246	+30	19
Colomba Vassallo	Women's individual	76	86	82	244	+28	=14
Martín Sandoval; Joaquín Sandoval; Constanza Figueroa; Colomba Vassallo	Mixed team	151	147	—N/a	298	+10	=4

== Handball ==
Chile qualified a men's and women's team.

Summary

Team	Event	Group play				5–8th place semifinals	Final / BM	
Team	Event	Opposition Result	Opposition Result	Opposition Result	Rank	Opposition Result	Opposition Result	Rank
Chile	Men's tournament	United States; L 23-26	Brazil; L 19-30	Mexico; W 32–21	3	5–8th place match Cuba; L 21–24	7th place match Uruguay; W 19–18	7
Chile	Women's tournament	Uruguay; L 22–29	United States; W 31–26	Paraguay; L 28–29	3	5–8th place match Cuba; W 37–24	5th place match United States; W 30–124	5

Men's roster

- Javier Ahumada
- Maximiliano Bravo
- José Cárcamo
- Fernando Castillo
- Camilo Garretón
- Maximiliano González
- Denny González
- Camilo Hernández
- Francisco Latorre
- Emilio Maulén
- Samuel Moreno
- Cristóbal Oyarzún
- Álvaro Ramos
- Lorenzo Venegas

Women's roster

- Daniela Asenjo
- Macarena Barraza
- Ignacia Berlinger
- Renata Campos
- Colomba Canessa
- Catalina González
- Camila Henríquez
- Anaís Larenas
- Agustina Lisboa
- Renata Lizana
- Constanza Paul
- Amanda Riquelme
- Antonia Sánchez
- Catalina Valdivia

== Judo ==
Chile qualified a team of six judokas (four men and two women).

Men

Athlete	Event	Round of 16	Quarterfinals	Semifinals	Repechage	Final / BM	
Athlete	Event	Opposition Result	Opposition Result	Opposition Result	Opposition Result	Opposition Result	Rank
Fabricio Meyer	−66 kg	—N/a	Condor (PER); W 10-00	Yang (USA); L 00-10	Bye	Bronze medal match Vanegas (COL); L 00-10	=5
Tomás Hernández	−73 kg	—N/a	Ramírez (MEX); W 10-00	Nolasco (USA); L 00-01	Bye	Bronze medal match Sánchez (COL); W 10-00	3rd place, bronze medalist(s)
Marko Figueroa	−100 kg	—N/a	Galvis (COL); W 10-00	Liubimovski (USA); L 00-10	Bye	Bronze medal match Cañizalez (VEN); W 10-00	3rd place, bronze medalist(s)
Patricio Urra	+100 kg	—N/a	Sánchez (MEX); L 00-10	Bye	Valdivia (PER); W 01-00	Bronze medal match Bessong (CAN); L 10-00	=5

Women

Athlete	Event	Round of 16	Quarterfinals	Semifinals	Repechage	Final / BM	
Athlete	Event	Opposition Result	Opposition Result	Opposition Result	Opposition Result	Opposition Result	Rank
Constanza Pérez	−63 kg	—N/a	Jaspe (USA); L 00-01	Did not advance	Jaspe (USA); L 00-01	Did not advance	=7
Kharla Casas	+78 kg	—N/a	Padilla (MEX); W DNS	Gómez (DOM); W 10-00	Bye	Curbelo (CUB); L 00-10	2nd place, silver medalist(s)

== Karate ==
Chile qualified a team of four karatekas (two men and two women).

Men

Athlete	Event	Round robin				Semifinal	Final	
Athlete	Event	Opposition Result	Opposition Result	Opposition Result	Rank	Opposition Result	Opposition Result	Rank
Maximiliano Jara	–67 kg	Ayphassorho (URU); L 6–10	Cano (NCA); W 8–8	Villegas (PER); L 7–12	4	Did not advance		
Sebastián Rojas	+84 kg	Vallejo (ECU); L 0–8	Gamboa (COL); L 1–5	Muñoz (BOL); L 1–4	4	Did not advance		

Women

Athlete	Event	Round robin				Semifinal	Final	
Athlete	Event	Opposition Result	Opposition Result	Opposition Result	Rank	Opposition Result	Opposition Result	Rank
Alen Hernández	–68 kg	Lopez (ECU); L 0–8	Muñoz (MEX); L 1–3	Juncosa (VEN); L 1–11	4	Did not advance		
Franchesca Muñoz	+68 kg	Manrique (ECU); L 2–4	Tam (CAN); W 9–1	—N/a	2 Q	Amaral (BRA); L 2–3	Did not advance	3rd place, bronze medalist(s)

== Open water swimming ==
Chile qualified one male open water swimmer.

Athlete	Event	Final	
Athlete	Event	Time	Rank
Iván Mallea	Men's 10 km	2:00:25	10

== Roller sports ==
=== Artistic ===
Chile qualified a team of four artistic skaters (two men and two women).

Men

Athlete	Event	Short program		Long program		Total	
Athlete	Event	Score	Rank	Score	Rank	Score	Rank
Agustín Véjar	Free skating	37.92	6	54.57	5	92.49	5
Maximiliano But	Solo dance	37.17	5	46.82	5	83.99	6

Women

Athlete	Event	Short program		Long program		Total	
Athlete	Event	Score	Rank	Score	Rank	Score	Rank
Josefa Ramos	Free skating	50.35	5	83.62	2	133.97	3rd place, bronze medalist(s)
Renata Borbarán	Solo dance	46.19	5	56.38	6	102.57	5

=== Speed skating ===
Chile qualified a team of four speed skaters (two men and two women).

Men

Athlete	Event	Qualification		Semifinal		Final	
Athlete	Event	Time	Rank	Time	Rank	Time	Rank
Sebastián Lillo	200 m time trial	—N/a				18.221	5
Sebastián Lillo	500 m + distance	44.291	5 Q	46.413	5 f	44.993	5
Gabriel Reyes	10,000 m elimination	—N/a				15:37.573	3rd place, bronze medalist(s)
Gabriel Reyes	1000 m sprint	1:25.139	4 q	—N/a		1:30.181	4
Gabriel Reyes	5000 m point race	—N/a				10	3rd place, bronze medalist(s)

Women

Athlete	Event	Qualification		Semifinal		Final	
Athlete	Event	Time	Rank	Time	Rank	Time	Rank
Catalina Lorca	200 m time trial	—N/a				19.453	4
Catalina Lorca	500 m + distance	47.304	4 Q	46.504	4 F	DQSF	4
Catalina Lorca	1000 m sprint	1:34.630	7 q	—N/a		1:35.920	3rd place, bronze medalist(s)
Camila Carreño	10,000 m elimination	—N/a				18:47.413	3rd place, bronze medalist(s)
Camila Carreño	5000 m point race	—N/a				23	2nd place, silver medalist(s)

=== Skateboarding ===
Chile qualified a team of four skateboarders (two men and two women).

Athlete	Event	Qualification		Final	
Athlete	Event	Score	Rank	Score	Rank
Mateo Acevedo	Men's	70.71	14	Did not advance	
Matías Floto	Men's	137.81	4 Q	158.50	4
Julieta Araya	Women's	46.26	11	Did not advance	
Matilde Mainguyague	Women's	9.26	16	Did not advance	

== Rowing ==
Chile qualified a team of 18 rowers (eight men and eight women).

Men

Athlete	Event	Heat		Repechage		Final A/B	
Athlete	Event	Time	Rank	Time	Rank	Time	Rank
Vicente de Jong	Single sculls	7:22.64	2 FA	Bye		7:18.84	4
Martín Arcos; Benito Rosas	Double sculls	7:00.57	2 R	6:47.82	2 F	6:33.28	2nd place, silver medalist(s)
Martín Arcos; Vicente de Jong; Benito Rosas; Ignacio Wilson	Quadruple sculls	—N/a				6:02.93	3rd place, bronze medalist(s)
Pedro Labatut; Rodrigo Paz	Pair	—N/a				6:42.63	1st place, gold medalist(s)
Pedro Labatut; Rodrigo Paz; Bastián López; Benjamín Menjiba	Four	—N/a				6:19.29	1st place, gold medalist(s)
Pedro Labatut; Rodrigo Paz; Bastián López; Benjamín Menjiba; Martín Arcos; Vicente de Jong; Benito Rosas; Ignacio Wilson; Damián Araya	Eight	—N/a				5:42.26	1st place, gold medalist(s)

Women

Athlete	Event	Heat		Repechage		Final A/B	
Athlete	Event	Time	Rank	Time	Rank	Time	Rank
Felipa Rosas	Single sculls	8:21.56	2 FA	Bye		8:00.58	2nd place, silver medalist(s)
Felipa Rosas; Antonia Liewald	Double sculls	7:59.89	2 R	7:28.66	1 F	7:12.59	2nd place, silver medalist(s)
Felipa Rosas; Antonia Liewald; Amanda Araneda; Antonia Pichott	Quadruple sculls	—N/a				6:46.54	1st place, gold medalist(s)
Camila Cofré; Emilia Liewald	Pair	—N/a				7:21.23	1st place, gold medalist(s)
Camila Cofré; Emilia Liewald; Emilia Rosas; Emily Serandour	Four	—N/a				6:40.52	1st place, gold medalist(s)
Camila Cofré; Emilia Liewald; Emilia Rosas; Emily Serandour; Amanda Araneda; Felipa Rosas; Josefa Ceballos; Antonia Pichot; Antonia Liewald	Eight	—N/a				6:23.73	1st place, gold medalist(s)

Mixed

Athlete	Event	Final A/B	
Athlete	Event	Time	Rank
Camila Jofré; Emilia Liewald; Emily Serandour; Josefa Ceballos; Pedro Labatut; Rodrigo Paz; Bastián López; Benjamín Menjiba; Antonia Liewald	Eight	6:03.21	1st place, gold medalist(s)

== Rugby sevens ==
Chile qualified a men's team of 12 athletes after finishing first in the 2024 Sudamérica Rugby Sevens.

Summary

Team	Event	Group stage				Semifinal	Final / BM / Pl.	
Team	Event	Opposition Result	Opposition Result	Opposition Result	Rank	Opposition Result	Opposition Result	Rank
Men's	Men's tournament	Jamaica; W 39–0	Mexico; W 36–0	Uruguay; L 12–12	2 Q	Argentina; L 5–26	Paraguay; W 35–12	3rd place, bronze medalist(s)

Roster

- Rodrigo Araya
- Claudio Roa
- Tomás Queirolo
- Lucas Pizarro
- Mateo Alcaide
- Martín Cura
- Dimitri Simonidis
- Lukas Winkler
- Santiago Wood
- José Bonilla
- Marco Alvano
- Nicolás Saab

== Sailing ==
Chile qualified two sailors (one man and one woman). Both are dinghy boats.

Men

Athlete	Event	Race					Net points	Rank
Athlete	Event	1	2	3	4	5	Net points	Rank
Ricardo Seguel	ILCA 7	1	12	~~15~~	14	13	40	12
Camila Ernst	ILCA 6	10	~~14~~	8	11	12	41	11

== Shooting ==
Chile qualified a team of eight rowers (six men and two women).

Men

Athlete	Event	Qualification		Final	
Athlete	Event	Points	Rank	Points	Rank
Luis Cerda	10 m air rifle	604.1	14	Did not advance	
Pablo Álvarez	10 m air rifle	600.1	15	Did not advance	
Diego Parra	10 m air pistol	571	3 Q	235.0	1st place, gold medalist(s)
José Aguilera	10 m air pistol	571	4 Q	213.0	3rd place, bronze medalist(s)
Raimundo Roche	Skeet	—N/a		55	1st place, gold medalist(s)
Rodrigo Moyano	Skeet	—N/a		41	3rd place, bronze medalist(s)

Women

Athlete	Event	Qualification		Final	
Athlete	Event	Points	Rank	Points	Rank
Allison Aguilera	10 m air rifle	612.6	10	Did not advance	
Danica Grbac	10 m air pistol	544	9	Did not advance	

Mixed

Athlete	Event	Qualification		Final	
Athlete	Event	Points	Rank	Points	Rank
Allison Aguilera; Luis Cerda	10 m air rifle	618.9	4	Did not advance	
Danica Grbac; Diego Parra	10 m air pistol	536	12	Did not advance	

== Squash ==
Chile qualified three athletes, all female.

Women

Athlete	Event	Round of 32	Round of 16	Quarterfinal	Semifinal	Final	
Athlete	Event	Opposition Result	Opposition Result	Opposition Result	Opposition Result	Opposition Result	Rank
Amalia Carranza	Singles	García (ECU); L 0–3	Did not advance				
Camila Needham	Singles	Botello (MEX); L 0–3	Did not advance				
Camila Needham; Fernanda Vilches	Doubles	—N/a	Bye	Suleman / Atherley (BAR); L 1–2	Did not advance		
Amalia Carranza; Camila Needham; Fernanda Vilches	Team	—N/a	Barbados; W 2–0	Paraguay; L 1–2	5th–8th place classification Argentina; L 0–2	Seventh place match Guatemala; L 0–2	8

== Swimming ==
Chile qualified a team of eight athletes.

Men

Athlete	Event	Heat		Final	
Athlete	Event	Time	Rank	Time	Rank
Elías Ardiles	100 m freestyle	51.52	17 q	51.23	15
Eduardo Cisternas	200 m freestyle	1:50.73	3 Q	1:47.99 NR	2nd place, silver medalist(s)
Eduardo Cisternas	400 m freestyle	3:55.83	2 Q	3:49.40 NR	2nd place, silver medalist(s)
Edhy Vargas	100 m backstroke	57.25	10 q	56.64	9
Edhy Vargas	200 m backstroke	2:03.01	3 Q	2:00.85	3rd place, bronze medalist(s)
Mariano Lazzerini	100 m breaststroke	1:01.15 NR	2 Q	1:01.57	4
Vicente Villanueva	100 m breaststroke	1:03.67	10 q	1:02.99	9
Mariano Lazzerini	200 m breaststroke	2:16.43	3 Q	2:14.23	3rd place, bronze medalist(s)
Vicente Villanueva	200 m breaststroke	2:18.99	9 Q	2:16.98	7
Elías Ardiles	100 m butterfly	54.51	8 Q	54.56	8
Vicente Villanueva	200 metre individual medley	2:11.12	14 q	2:05.88	9
Eduardo Cisternas; Mariano Lazzerini; Edhy Vargas; Elías Ardiles	4 × 200 metre freestyle relay	—N/a		7:26.26 NR	3rd place, bronze medalist(s)
Eduardo Cisternas; Mariano Lazzerini; Edhy Vargas; Elías Ardiles	4 × 200 metre medley relay	3:47.28	7 Q	3:41.68 NR	5

Women

Athlete	Event	Heat		Final	
Athlete	Event	Time	Rank	Time	Rank
Montserrat Spielmann	800 m freestyle	—N/a		9:09.71	6
Martina Roper	100 m backstroke	1:08.54	=21	Did not advance	
Martina Roper	200 m backstroke	2:24.13	14 q	2:23.27	15
Montserrat Spielmann	100 m butterfly	1:02.55	6 Q	1:01.52	5
Montserrat Spielmann	200 m butterfly	2:21.63	10 q	2:20.57	10

== Taekwondo ==
Chile qualified two athletes, both male.

Kyorugi

Men

Athlete	Event	Quarterfinals	Semifinals	Final / BM	
Athlete	Event	Opposition Result	Opposition Result	Opposition Result	Rank
Áaron Contreras	–58 kg	Espinola (ARG); L 1–2	Did not advance	Bronze medal match Cortes (MEX); L 2–0	=5
Cristián Olivero	–68 kg	Sánchez (COL); W 2–0	Morais (BRA); W 2–0	Rodriguez (USA); W 2–0	1st place, gold medalist(s)

== Tennis ==
Chile qualified a team of five tennis players (two men and three women).

Men

Athlete	Event	Round of 32	Round of 16	Quarterfinal	Semifinal	Final / BM	
Athlete	Event	Opposition Result	Opposition Result	Opposition Result	Opposition Result	Opposition Result	Rank
Thomas Menzel	Singles	Frutos (PAR); L 0–2	Did not advance				
Benjamín Pérez	Singles	Alfred (ISV); W 2–0	Lora (BOL); L 1–2	Did not advance			
Thomas Menzel; Benjamín Pérez	Doubles	—N/a	Lora / Suárez (BOL); W 2–1	Vertberger / Pagani (ARG); L 0–2	Did not advance		

Women

Athlete	Event	Round of 32	Round of 16	Quarterfinal	Semifinal	Final / BM	
Athlete	Event	Opposition Result	Opposition Result	Opposition Result	Opposition Result	Opposition Result	Rank
Camila Rodero	Singles	Sumoya (BOL); W 2–0	Rivoli (BRA); W 2–1	Meabe (ARG); W 2–0	Larraya (ARG); L 1–2	Bronze medal match Vázquez (ARG); L 0–2	4
Camila Zouein	Singles	Pimentel (PER); L 0–2	Did not advance				
Agustina Soto	Singles	Larraya (PAR); L 0–2	Did not advance				
Camila Rodero; Agustina Soto	Doubles	—N/a	Marcos / Rondero (PAR); W 2–0	Vázquez / Larraya (ARG); L 0–2	Did not advance		

Mixed

Athlete	Event	Round of 16	Quarterfinal	Semifinal	Final / BM	
Athlete	Event	Opposition Result	Opposition Result	Opposition Result	Opposition Result	Rank
Benjamín Pérez; Agustina Soto	Doubles	Poma / Rendón (ESA); W 2–0	Alvarez / Lugo (PUR); L 0–2	Did not advance		

== Triathlon ==
Chile qualified a total of four athletes (two men and two women).

Individual

Athlete	Event	Time					Total	Rank
Athlete	Event	Swim (1.5 km)	Trans 1	Bike (40 km)	Trans 2	Run (10 km)	Total	Rank
Andree Buc	Men's	10:39	0:42	28:12	0:19	14:36	54:30	3rd place, bronze medalist(s)
Daniel Ubilla	Men's	10:59	0:43	28:58	0:20	16:44	57:45	16
Sol Ottenhsimer	Women's	12:29	0:54	30:20	0:19	21:42	1:05:47	15
Rafaela Capó	Women's	11:51	0:48	29:48	0:20	18:35	1:01:23	5

Relay

Athlete	Event	Time					Total	Rank
Athlete	Event	Swim (300 m)	Trans 1	Bike (7 km)	Trans 2	Run (2 km)	Total	Rank
Rafaela Capó	Mixed	5:42	0:48	9:17	0:19	5:25	21:31	—N/a
Andree Buc	Mixed	5:44	0:41	8:25	0:19	4:32	19:41	—N/a
Sol Ottenhsimer	Mixed	7:33	0:57	10:57	0:22	6:22	26:11	—N/a
Daniel Ubilla	Mixed	5:12	0:43	9:11	0:20	5:23	20:49	—N/a
Total	Mixed	—N/a					1:30:21	5

== Volleyball ==
=== Indoor ===
Chile qualified a women's team of 12 athletes.

Summary

Team	Event	Group stage				Quarterfinal	Semifinal	Final / BM / Pl.	
Team	Event	Opposition Result	Opposition Result	Opposition Result	Rank	Opposition Result	Opposition Result	Opposition Result	Rank
Chile women's	Women's tournament	Dominican Republic; L 0–3	Brazil; L 0–3	Mexico; L 0–3	4	Did not advance			

=== Women's tournament ===
Chile qualified a women's team (of 12 athletes).

Roster

Head coach: Sergio Soto

- Florencia Aguilera
- Esperanza Basualto
- Florencia Giglio
- Isabella Grille
- Daniela Maureira
- Esperanza Needham
- Javiera Núñez
- Savka Rendic
- Amanda Schnetzer
- Martina Tapia
- Diva Varas
- María Véliz

== Water skiing ==
Chile qualified a total of four water skiers (one man and three women) and two wakeboarders (one of each gender).

Athlete	Event	Preliminary					Final				
Athlete	Event	Slalom	Tricks	Jump	Total	Rank	Slalom	Tricks	Jump	Total	Rank
Matías González	Men's slalom	2.00/58/11.25	—N/a			6 Q	3.50/58/12.00	—N/a			8
Matías González	Men's tricks	—N/a	11860	—N/a		2 Q	—N/a	12280	—N/a		2nd place, silver medalist(s)
Matías González	Men's jump	—N/a		0.0	—N/a	10	Did not advance				
Matías González	Men's overall	838.10	980.98	0.00	1,819.08	5	Did not advance				
Trinidad Espinal	Women's slalom	2.00/55/11.25	—N/a			4	Did not advance				
Trinidad Espinal	Women's tricks	—N/a	1040	—N/a		9	Did not advance				
Daniela Kretschmer	Women's slalom	3.00/55/11.25	—N/a			1 Q	3.00/55/11.25	—N/a			2nd place, silver medalist(s)
Emilia Méndez	Women's slalom	2.00/55/11.25	—N/a			3 Q	3.00/55/11.25	—N/a			1st place, gold medalist(s)
Emilia Méndez	Women's tricks	—N/a	370	—N/a		13	Did not advance				
Emilia Méndez	Women's jump	—N/a		39.4	—N/a	2 Q	—N/a		39.4	—N/a	2nd place, silver medalist(s)
Emilia Méndez	Women's overall	988.76	44.69	878.43	1,911.88	6	766.67	33.76	790.08	1590.51	6

Wakeboard

Athlete	Event	Qualification		Last Chance Qualifier		Final	
Athlete	Event	Score	Rank	Score	Rank	Score	Rank
Kord Holscher	Men's	37.00	4	48.67	2 Q	20.00	6
Ignacia Holscher	Women's	69.44	1 Q	Bye		31.78	5

== Weightlifting ==
Chile qualified a team of four weightlifters (two men and two women).

Men

Athlete	Event	Snatch		Clean & jerk		Total	
Athlete	Event	Weight	Rank	Weight	Rank	Weight	Rank
Benjamín Arias	–63 kg	117	4	140	=5	257	5
Benjamín Riquelme	–71 kg	120	3	150	=2	270	3rd place, bronze medalist(s)

Women

Athlete	Event	Snatch		Clean & jerk		Total	
Athlete	Event	Weight	Rank	Weight	Rank	Weight	Rank
Bianca Arias	–63 kg	75	5	102	5	177	5
Victoria Barrientos	+77 kg	80	6	107	6	187	6

== Wrestling ==
Chile qualified two wrestlers (one for each gender).

Key:

- VT (ranking points: 5–0 or 0–5) – Victory by fall.
- VB (ranking points: 5–0 or 0–5) – Victory by injury (VF for forfeit, VA for withdrawal or disqualification)
- PP (ranking points: 3–1 or 1–3) – Decision by points – the loser with technical points.
- PO (ranking points: 3–0 or 0–3) – Decision by points – the loser without technical points.
- ST (ranking points: 4–0 or 0–4) – Great superiority – the loser without technical points and a margin of victory of at least 8 (Greco-Roman) or 10 (freestyle) points.
- SP (ranking points: 4–1 or 1–4) – Technical superiority – the loser with technical points and a margin of victory of at least 8 (Greco-Roman) or 10 (freestyle) points.

Athlete	Event	Group round				Quarterfinal	Semifinal	Final / BM	
Athlete	Event	Opposition Result	Opposition Result	Opposition Result	Rank	Opposition Result	Opposition Result	Opposition Result	Rank
Nicolás Araya	Men's Greco-Roman +130 kg	Attao (USA); L 0–10	Barros (BRA); L 0–10	Herrera (MEX); L 2–11	4	Did not advance			
Melanie Sánchez	Women's freestyle 76 kg	—N/a				Tristan (USA); L 0–10	Did not advance		
