= Artistic swimming at the 2025 Junior Pan American Games =

Artistic swimming at the 2025 Junior American Games
- Venue: Olympic Aquatic Centre
- Start date: August 20, 2025
- End date: August 23, 2025
- No. of events: 3

The artistic swimming events at the 2025 Junior Pan American Games were held at the Olympic Aquatic Centre, located in the Olympic Park in Luque, in the Greater Asuncion area. The events were contested between August 15 and 17, 2025.

Three events were contested, a women's duet plus mixed team and duets.

== Qualification ==
Qualification for the games was based on the results from the 2025 Pan American Aquatics Championships.

== Medal summary ==
=== Medal table ===
* Host nation (Paraguay)

Rank	Nation	Gold	Silver	Bronze	Total
1	Mexico	3	0	0	3
2	Chile	0	1	1	2
2	United States	0	1	1	2
4	Canada	0	1	0	1
5	Brazil	0	0	1	1
Totals (5 entries)		3	3	3	9

=== Medalists ===
Event	Gold	Silver	Bronze
Women's duet	Mexico; Camila Argumedo; Daniela Ávila	Canada; Olena Verbinska; Charlie Breault	United States; Anamaria Camero; Hyeonseo Ryou
Mixed duet	Mexico; Nayeli Mondragón; Diego Villalobos	Chile; Theodora Garrido; Nicolás Campos	Brazil; Bernardo Barreto; Eduarda Chagas
Team	Mexico; Camila Argumedo; Nayeli Mondragón; Fernanda Carmona; Carolina Arzate; Victoria Delgado; Citlali Nuño; Diego Villalobos; Daniela Ávila; Jacqueline Melendez	United States; Anamaria Camero; Dempsey Raftus; Eloise Krigbaum; Hyeonseo Ryou; Isabella Bae; Jennifer Sun Ryu; Mona Sophie Schwickert; Olivia Zhu; Samantha Chu	Chile; Dominga Cerda; Dominga Césped; Bárbara Coppelli; Theodora Garrido; Josefa Oravec; Chloé Plaut Dekock; Eva Rubio Mella; Macarena Vial; Nicolás Campos

== Results ==
=== Women's duet ===
Technical routine – August 20 / Free routine – August 22

Rank	Country	Athlete	Technical	Free	Total
1st place, gold medalist(s)	Mexico	Camila Argumedo; Daniela Ávila	264.2933	240.3692	504.6625
2nd place, silver medalist(s)	Canada	Olena Verbinska; Charlie Breault	261.8517	234.3188	496.1705
3rd place, bronze medalist(s)	United States	Anamaria Camero; Hyeonseo Ryou	255.0717	234.8670	489.9387
4	Chile	Bárbara Coppelli; Macarena Vial	237.6775	218.0417	455.7192
5	Peru	Luciana Quintanilla; Camila Fernández	224.5266	205.5696	430.0962
6	Argentina	María Carasatorre; Tiziana Bonucci	221.6225	189.1550	410.7775
7	Brazil	Eduarda Chagas; Hannah Sukman	229.7967	180.0842	409.8809
8	Colombia	Luisa Botero; Mabel Tobón	228.0500	153.6404	381.6904
9	Uruguay	Martina Maisonaba; Inés Cabral	198.3933	165.1805	363.5738
10	Aruba	Xiana Hoo; Kendra Simon	196.2525	162.1904	358.4429
11	Costa Rica	Mariangel Gonzalez; Amanda Arias	174.2150	130.5066	304.7216
12	Cuba	Alejandra Molina; Idaili Diaz	173.3575	129.1287	302.4862
13	El Salvador	Gabriela Mercado; Daira Sanchez	167.0717	122.0596	289.1313
14	Venezuela	Marialis Mujica; Paola Cordero	157.5225	102.7046	260.2271
15	Guatemala	Sara González; Cristel Reyes	119.8183	72.8000	192.6183

=== Mixed duet ===
Technical routine – August 20 / Free routine – August 22

Rank	Country	Athlete	Technical	Free	Total
1st place, gold medalist(s)	Mexico	Nayeli Mondragón; Diego Villalobos	217.3984	313.1167	530.5151
2nd place, silver medalist(s)	Chile	Theodora Garrido; Nicolás Campos	180.4883	254.8896	435.3779
3rd place, bronze medalist(s)	Brazil	Eduarda Chagas; Bernardo Barreto	167.4283	216.5150	383.9433
4	Canada	Isabelle Ann Koptie; Nathan Zhang	156.3733	208.5162	364.8895
5	Cuba	Talia de Jesus Joa; José Borges	117.5333	146.1984	263.7317

=== Team ===
Technical routine – August 20 / Free routine – August 22 / Acrobatic routine – August 23

Rank	Country	Athlete	Technical	Free	Acrobatic	Total
1st place, gold medalist(s)	Mexico	Camila Argumedo; Nayeli Mondragón; Fernanda Carmona; Carolina Arzate; Victoria Delgado; Citlali Nuño; Diego Villalobos; Daniela Ávila; Jacqueline Melendez	251.9950	275.3050	194.9850	722.2850
2nd place, silver medalist(s)	United States	Anamaria Camero; Dempsey Raftus; Eloise Krigbaum; Hyeonseo Ryou; Isabella Bae; Jennifer Sun Ryu; Mona Sophie Schwickert; Olivia Zhu; Samantha Chu	237.0475	274.0180	161.5001	672.5656
3rd place, bronze medalist(s)	Chile	Dominga Cerda; Dominga Césped; Bárbara Coppelli; Theodora Garrido; Josefa Oravec; Chloé Plaut Dekock; Eva Rubio Mella; Macarena Vial; Nicolás Campos	229.6350	244.6411	159.7715	634.0476
4	Colombia	María Paramo; Valerie Cuenca; Natalia Jurado; Emily Minante; Laura Rodríguez; Danna Acosta; Luisa Botero; Mabel Tobón; Aileen Vélez	217.8250	192.3588	139.7488	549.9326
5	Brazil	Bernardo Barreto; Eduarda Chagas; Julia Godinho; Manuela Marques; Maria Julia Stramandinoli; Hannah Sukman; Julia Tomelin; Isabella Viana; Isabella Zanata	213.2050	188.9167	142.0608	544.1825
6	Peru	Fabiana Choy; Lucía Blanco; Luz Belen Velarde; Luciana Saldamando; Luciana Quintanilla; Valéria Machicado; Rafaella Romero; Camila Fernández; Carolina Sotil	198.8967	167.0548	141.4458	507.3973
7	Venezuela	Fabiana Torres; Daniela Silva; Marialis Mujica; Mariangel Pacheco; Paola Cordero; Stephany Torres; Mariangel Marcano; Eyleen Vegas	134.5125	107.0521	94.5671	336.1317
8	Cuba	José Borges; Analia Cabrera; Alejandra Molina; Berglis Rivera; Ana González; Talia de Jesus Joa; Nelkys Sanchez; Yenisleydis Rodriguez; Idaili Diaz	135.6883	94.1500	69.6050	299.4433
