= Rowing at the 2025 Junior Pan American Games =

Rowing at the 2025 Junior American Games
- Venue: Asunción Bay
- Start date: August 9, 2025
- End date: August 13, 2025
- No. of events: 13

The rowing events at the 2025 Junior Pan American Games were held at the Asunción Bay in Asunción. The events were contested between August 9 and 13, 2025.

Thirteen events were contested, six for men, six for women, and one mixed. The winner of the single sculls events qualified for the 2027 Pan American Games in Lima, Peru.

== Qualification ==
Qualification was based on the results from a Qualification Regatta, held in Asunción, Paraguay.

== Medal summary ==
=== Medal table ===
* Host nation (Paraguay)

Rank	Nation	Gold	Silver	Bronze	Total
1	Chile	8	3	1	12
2	Brazil	2	4	4	10
3	Paraguay*	1	3	2	6
4	Cuba	1	0	1	2
4	Uruguay	1	0	1	2
6	Argentina	0	2	0	2
7	Canada	0	1	3	4
8	Mexico	0	0	1	1
Totals (8 entries)		13	13	13	39

=== Medalists ===
==== Men ====
Event	Gold	Silver	Bronze
Single sculls	Luciano García; Uruguay	Santino Menin; Argentina	Marcelo Almeida; Brazil
Double sculls	Brazil; João Vinicius Ferreira; Daniel Passold	Chile; Martín Marcos; Benito Rosas	Mexico; Roberto Ahumada; José Navarro
Quadruple sculls	Cuba; Henry Heredia; Adel Gutiérrez; Ledua Suárez; Roberto Paz	Brazil; Marcelo Almeida; João Vinicius Ferreira; Daniel Passold; Arthur Veiga	Chile; Martín Arcos; Vicente de Jong; Benito Rosas; Ignácio Wilson
Coxless pair	Chile; Pedro Labatut; Rodrigo Paz	Paraguay; Nicolas Villalba; Nicolas Invernizzi	Brazil; Miguel Marques; Kayki Siqueira
Coxless four	Chile; Pedro Labatut; Bastián López; Benjamín Menjiba; Rodrigo Paz	Argentina; Agustín Annese; Fernando Álvarez; Marcos Rojas; Martín Mansilla	Brazil; Andrei Jessé; Miguel Marques; Kayki Siqueira; Diogo Volkmann
Eight	Chile; Martín Arcos; Vicente de Jong; Pedro Labatut; Bastián López; Benjamín Menjiba; Rodrigo Paz; Benito Rosas; Ignácio Wilson; Damián Araya	Brazil; Marcelo Almeida; João Vinicius Ferreira; Andrei Jessé; Miguel Marques; Daniel Passold; Kayki Siqueira; Arthur Veiga; Diogo Volkmann; Marcello Oliveira	Cuba; Ronny Álvarez; Henry Heredia; Keiler Ávila; Adel Gutiérrez; Leduar Suárez; Robert Fernández; Roberto Paz; Félix Puentes; Pedro González

==== Women ====
Event	Gold	Silver	Bronze
Single sculls	Nicole Martínez; Paraguay	Felipa Rosas; Chile	Cloe Callorda; Uruguay
Double sculls	Brazil; Lara Pizarro; Jennifer Silva	Chile; Felipa Rosas; Antonia Liewald	Canada; Jalyn Mowry; Tess Friar
Quadruple sculls	Chile; Amanda Araneda; Felipa Rosas; Antonia Pichott; Antonia Liewald	Brazil; Isabella Gomes; Julia Moreno; Lara Pizarro; Jennifer Silva	Paraguay; Fiorela Rodríguez; Agustina López; Nicole Martínez; Lucía Martínez
Coxless pair	Chile; Camila Cofré; Emilia Liewald	Paraguay; Nicole Martínez; Fiorela Rodríguez	Canada; Ella McKinley; Riley Richardson
Coxless four	Chile; Camila Cofré; Emilia Liewald; Emilia Rosas; Emily Serandour	Paraguay; Fiorela Rodríguez; Agustina López; Nicole Martínez; Lucía Martínez	Canada; Alessandra Tuttle; Ella McKinley; Riley Richardson; Firinne Rolfe
Eight	Chile; Amanda Araneda; Camila Cofré; Emilia Liewald; Felipa Rosas; Emilia Rosas; Emily Serandour; Josefa Ceballos; Antonia Pichott; Antonia Liewald	Canada; Alessandra Tuttle; Ella McKinley; Riley Richardson; Annika Goodwyn; Maylie Valiquette; Jalyn Mowry; Tess Friar; Firinne Rolfe; Teija Patry	Brazil; Ana Júlia Ferreira; Maria Fuhrmann; Isabella Gomes; Julia Moreno; Luiza Nazário; Lara Pizarro; Giulia Renata; Jennifer Silva; Kauanne Alves

==== Mixed ====
Event	Gold	Silver	Bronze
Eight	Chile; Camila Cofré; Emilia Liewald; Emily Serandour; Josefa Ceballos; Bastián López; Rodrigo Paz; Pedro Labatut; Benjamín Mejiba; Antonia Liewald	Brazil; Andrei Jessé; Miguel Marques; Kayki Rocha; Diogo Volkmann; Ana Júlia Ferreira; Maria Fuhrmann; Luiza Nazário; Giulia Renata; Marcello Oliveira	Paraguay; Fiorela Rodríguez; Nicolas Villalba; Gabriel Yser; Agustina López; Nicolas Invernizzi; Alejo Giménez; Nicole Martínez; Juan Iglesias; Lucía Martínez

== Results ==
=== Men's events ===
==== Men's single sculls ====
Heats – August 12

Rank	Name	Nationality	Time	Notes
Heat 1
1	Marcelo Almeida	Brazil	7:14.89	FA
2	Santino Menín	Argentina	7:18.46	FA
3	Jonas Díaz	Venezuela	7:27.53	R
4	Nicolás Luna	Mexico	7:34.95	R
5	Oliver Baker	Canada	7:35.58	R
Heat 2
1	Luciano García	Uruguay	7:11.70	FA
2	Vicente de Jong	Chile	7:22.64	FA
3	Pedro González	Cuba	7:33.65	R
4	Gonzalo Ruiz	Paraguay	7:35.07	R

Repechage – August 12

Rank	Name	Nationality	Time	Notes
1	Jonas Díaz	Venezuela	7:18.22	FA
2	Oliver Baker	Canada	7:19.66	FA
3	Pedro González	Cuba	7:20.02	FB
4	Nicolás Luna	Mexico	7:30.41	FB
5	Gonzalo Ruiz	Paraguay	7:36.47	FB

Final A – August 13

Rank	Name	Nationality	Time	Notes
1st place, gold medalist(s)	Luciano García	Uruguay	7:06.95	
2nd place, silver medalist(s)	Santino Menín	Argentina	7:09.66	
3rd place, bronze medalist(s)	Marcelo Almeida	Brazil	7:11.35	
4	Vicente de Jong	Chile	7:18.84	
5	Oliver Baker	Canada	7:22.44	
6	Jonas Díaz	Venezuela	7:23.14	

Final B – August 13

Rank	Name	Nationality	Time	Notes
7	Pedro González	Cuba	7:25.04	
8	Nicolás Luna	Mexico	7:27.08	
9	Gonzalo Ruiz	Paraguay	7:49.87	

==== Men's double sculls ====
Heats – August 9

Rank	Name	Nationality	Time	Notes
Heat 1
1	Juan Jijon; Máximo Pacheco	Argentina	6:51.08	F
2	Kyland Mels; Oliver Baker	Canada	7:10.27	R
3	José Navarro; Roberto Ahumada	Mexico	7:14.84	R
4	Leduar Suárez; Roberto Paz	Cuba	7:18.92	R
Heat 2
1	João Vinicius Ferreira; Daniel Passold	Brazil	6:55.39	F
2	Martín Arcos; Benito Rosas	Chile	7:00.57	R
3	Gabriel Yser; Alejo Giménez	Paraguay	7:16.58	R

Repechage – August 9

Rank	Name	Nationality	Time	Notes
1	Leduar Suárez; Roberto Paz	Cuba	6:46.23	F
2	Martín Arcos; Benito Rosas	Chile	6:47.82	F
3	José Navarro; Roberto Ahumada	Mexico	6:48.03	F
4	Kyland Mels; Oliver Baker	Canada	6:50.59	F
5	Gabriel Yser; Alejo Giménez	Paraguay	6:56.61	

Final A – August 10

Rank	Name	Nationality	Time	Notes
1st place, gold medalist(s)	João Vinicius Ferreira; Daniel Passold	Brazil	6:31.97	
2nd place, silver medalist(s)	Martín Arcos; Benito Rosas	Chile	6:33.28	
3rd place, bronze medalist(s)	José Navarro; Roberto Ahumada	Mexico	6:34.71	
4	Kyland Mels; Oliver Baker	Canada	6:35.04	
5	Leduar Suárez; Roberto Paz	Cuba	6:39.06	
6	Juan Jijon; Máximo Pacheco	Argentina	6:41.41	

==== Men's quadruple sculls ====
Final – August 13

Rank	Name	Nationality	Time	Notes
1st place, gold medalist(s)	Henry Heredia; Adel Gutiérrez; Leduar Suárez; Roberto Paz	Cuba	6:01.64	
2nd place, silver medalist(s)	Arthur Veiga; Daniel Passold; João Vinicius Ferreira; Marcelo Almeida	Brazil	6:01.75	
3rd place, bronze medalist(s)	Martín Arcos; Vicente de Jong; Benito Rosas; Ignacio Wilson	Chile	6:02.93	
4	Emilio Battilana; Juan Jijon; Máximo Pacheco; Santino Menin	Argentina	6:04.42	
5	Jorge Pettengill; Anthony Madan; Gonzalo Ruiz; Santino Ortega	Paraguay	6:18.74	

==== Men's coxless pair ====
Final – August 10

Rank	Name	Nationality	Time	Notes
1st place, gold medalist(s)	Pedro Labatut; Rodrigo Paz	Chile	6:42.63	
2nd place, silver medalist(s)	Nicolás Villalba; Nicolás Invernizzi	Paraguay	6:47.99	
3rd place, bronze medalist(s)	Kayki Siqueira; Miguel Marques	Brazil	6:48.35	
4	Agustín Annese; Fernando Álvarez	Argentina	6:49.11	
5	José García; Erick Muñoz	Mexico	6:59.03	
6	Henry Heredia; Adel Gutiérrez	Cuba	7:25.16	

==== Men's coxless four ====
Final – August 11

Rank	Name	Nationality	Time	Notes
1st place, gold medalist(s)	Pedro Labatut; Rodrigo Paz; Bastián López; Benjamín Menjiba	Chile	6:19.29	
2nd place, silver medalist(s)	Agustín Annese; Fernando Álvarez; Marcos Rojas; Martín Mansilla	Argentina	6:22.91	
3rd place, bronze medalist(s)	Andrei Jessé; Diogo Volkmann; Miguel Marques; Kayki Siqueira	Brazil	6:32.41	
4	Henry Heredia; Adel Gutiérrez; Leduar Suárez; Roberto Paz	Cuba	6:33.86	
5	Nicolás Villalba; Nicolás Invernizzi; Gabriel Yser; Alejo Giménez	Paraguay	6:43.07	

==== Men's eight ====
Final – August 10

Rank	Name	Nationality	Time	Notes
1st place, gold medalist(s)	Martín Arcos; Vicente de Jong; Pedro Labatut; Bastián López; Benjamín Menjiba; Rodrigo Paz; Benito Rosas; Ignacio Wilson; Damián Araya	Chile	5:42.26	
2nd place, silver medalist(s)	Marcello Oliveira; Andrei Alves; João Vinicius Ferreira; Arthur Veiga; Daniel Passold; Diogo Volkmann; Kayki Siqueira; Marcelo Almeida; Miguel Marques	Brazil	5:45.75	
3rd place, bronze medalist(s)	Ronny Álvarez; Henry Heredia; Keiler Ávila; Adel Gutiérrez; Leduar Suárez; Robert Fernández; Roberto Paz; Félix Puentes; Pedro González	Cuba	5:45.96	
4	Agustín Annese; Guadalupe Louzao; Fernando Álvarez; Emilio Battilana; Juan Jijon; Máximo Pacheco; Marcos Rojas; Martín Mansilla; Santino Menin	Argentina	5:48.99	
5	Nicolás Villalba; Gabriel Yser; Jorge Pettengill; Nicolás Invernizzi; Anthony Madan; Alejo Giménez; Juan Iglesias; Gonzalo Ruiz; Santino Ortega	Paraguay	5:57.32	

=== Women's events ===
==== Women's single sculls ====
Heats – August 9

Rank	Name	Nationality	Time	Notes
Heat 1
1	Nicole Martínez	Paraguay	8:15.89	FA
2	Filipa Rosas	Chile	8:21.56	FA
3	Cloe Callorda	Uruguay	8:25.45	R
4	Elena Cerrudo	Argentina	8:29.44	R
5	Julia Moreno	Brazil	9:45.08	R
Heat 2
1	Ximena Castellanos	Mexico	8:33.90	FA
2	Luciana Zegarra	Peru	8:37.93	FA
3	Ana Jimenez	Cuba	8:40.04	R
4	Lesli González	Guatemala	8:44.09	R

Repechage – August 9

Rank	Name	Nationality	Time	Notes
1	Cloe Callorda	Uruguay	8:20.41	FA
2	Julia Moreno	Brazil	8:24.60	FA
3	Elena Cerrudo	Argentina	8:29.00	FB
4	Lesli González	Guatemala	8:41.78	FB
5	Ana Jimenez	Cuba	8:51.66	FB

Final A – August 10

Rank	Name	Nationality	Time	Notes
1st place, gold medalist(s)	Nicole Martínez	Paraguay	7:50.02	
2nd place, silver medalist(s)	Filipa Rosas	Chile	8:00.58	
3rd place, bronze medalist(s)	Cloe Callorda	Uruguay	8:05.26	
4	Ximena Castellanos	Mexico	8:10.73	
5	Julia Moreno	Brazil	8:19.29	
6	Luciana Zegarra	Peru	8:19.80	

Final B – August 10

Rank	Name	Nationality	Time	Notes
7	Elena Cerrudo	Argentina	8:12.13	
8	Lesli González	Guatemala	8:21.41	
9	Ana Jimenez	Cuba	8:37.86	

==== Women's double sculls ====
Heats – August 11

Rank	Name	Nationality	Time	Notes
Heat 1
1	Jalyn Mowry; Tess Friar	Canada	7:41.49	F
2	Carmela Molina; Carmen Zarate	Argentina	7:49.77	R
3	Nicolle González; Joselin Guevara	Guatemala	8:08.21	R
4	Agustina López; Lucía Martínez	Paraguay	8:01.98	R
Heat 2
1	Jennifer Silva; Lara Pizarro	Brazil	7:40.56	F
2	Felipa Rosas; Antonia Liewald	Chile	7:59.89	R
3	Claudia Tolón; Natalie Morales	Cuba	8:03.73	R

Repechage – August 11

Rank	Name	Nationality	Time	Notes
1	Felipa Rosas; Antonia Liewald	Chile	7:28.66	F
2	Carmela Molina; Carmen Zarate	Argentina	7:31.12	F
3	Agustina López; Lucía Martínez	Paraguay	7:36.84	F
4	Nicolle González; Joselin Guevara	Guatemala	7:42.06	F
5	Claudia Tolón; Natalie Morales	Cuba	7:49.49	

Final A – August 12

Rank	Name	Nationality	Time	Notes
1st place, gold medalist(s)	Jennifer Silva; Lara Pizarro	Brazil	7:11.17	
2nd place, silver medalist(s)	Felipa Rosas; Antonia Liewald	Chile	7:12.59	
3rd place, bronze medalist(s)	Jalyn Mowry; Tess Friar	Canada	7:23.60	
4	Carmela Molina; Carmen Zarate	Argentina	7:27.89	
5	Agustina López; Lucía Martínez	Paraguay	7:40.82	
6	Nicolle González; Joselin Guevara	Guatemala	7:45.97	

==== Women's quadruple sculls ====
Final – August 13

Rank	Name	Nationality	Time	Notes
1st place, gold medalist(s)	Felipa Rosas; Antonia Liewald; Amanda Araneda; Antonia Pichott	Chile	6:46.54	
2nd place, silver medalist(s)	Jennifer Silva; Lara Pizarro; Isabella Gomes; Julia Moreno	Brazil	6:49.29	
3rd place, bronze medalist(s)	Agustina López; Lucía Martínez; Fiorela Rodríguez; Nicole Martínez	Paraguay	6:50.83	
4	Carmela Molina; Carmen Zarate; Elena Cerrudo; Julieta Ricciuti	Argentina	6:57.35	
5	Claudia Tolón; Natalie Morales; Leah Almeida; Ana Jimenez	Cuba	7:08.27	

==== Women's coxless pair ====
Final – August 12

Rank	Name	Nationality	Time	Notes
1st place, gold medalist(s)	Camila Cofré; Emilia Liewald	Chile	7:21.23	
2nd place, silver medalist(s)	Fiorela Rodríguez; Nicole Martínez	Paraguay	7:27.71	
3rd place, bronze medalist(s)	Ella McKinley; Riley Richarson	Canada	7:34.63	
4	Ana Júlia Ferreira; Maria Fuhrmann	Brazil	7:36.22	
5	Florencia Duarte; Catalina Deandrea	Argentina	7:43.21	
6	Paulina Centurion; Valeria Olivera	Uruguay	7:55.27	

==== Women's coxless four ====
Final – August 11

Rank	Name	Nationality	Time	Notes
1st place, gold medalist(s)	Camila Cofré; Emilia Liewald; Emilia Rosas; Emily Serandour	Chile	6:40.52	
2nd place, silver medalist(s)	Fiorela Rodríguez; Agustina López; Nicole Martínez; Lucía Martínez	Paraguay	6:47.46	
3rd place, bronze medalist(s)	Alessandra Tuttle; Ella McKinley; Riley Richardson; Firinne Rolfe	Canada	6:48.74	
4	Ingrid Marcipar; Iara Simonitti; Catalina Deandrea; Florencia Duarte	Argentina	6:53.37	
5	Ana Júlia Ferreira; Giulia Renata; Luiza Nazário; Maria Fuhrmann	Brazil	7:09.99	

==== Women's eight ====
Final – August 12

Rank	Name	Nationality	Time	Notes
1st place, gold medalist(s)	Camila Cofré; Emilia Liewald; Emilia Rosas; Emily Serandour; Amanda Araneda; Felipa Rosas; Josefa Ceballos; Antonia Pichott; Antonia Liewald	Chile	6:23.73	
2nd place, silver medalist(s)	Alessandra Tuttle; Ella McKinley; Riley Richardson; Firinne Rolfe; Annika Goodwyn; Maylie Valiquette; Jalyn Mowry; Tess Friar; Teija Patry	Canada	6:27.64	
3rd place, bronze medalist(s)	Ana Júlia Ferreira; Giulia Renata; Luiza Nazário; Maria Fuhrmann; Isabella Gomes; Jennifer Almeida; Julia Moreno; Lara Pizarro; Kuanne Alves	Brazil	6:36.79	
4	Ingrid Marcipar; Iara Simonitti; Catalina Deandrea; Florencia Duarte; Carmela Molina; Guadalupe Louzao; Elena Cerrudo; Julieta Ricciuti; Carmen Zarate	Argentina	6:39.73	
5	Fiorela Rodríguez; Agustina López; Nicole Martínez; Lucía Martínez; Mia Acosta; Cecilia Balcazar; Ximena Verdun; Mia Miranda; Martina Noguera	Paraguay	6:50.25	

=== Mixed event ===
==== Mixed eight ====
Final – August 13

Rank	Name	Nationality	Time	Notes
1st place, gold medalist(s)	Camila Cofré; Emilia Liewald; Emily Serandour; Josefa Ceballos; Pedro Labatut; Bastián López; Rodrigo Paz; Benjamín Menjiba; Antonia Liewald	Chile	6:03.21	
2nd place, silver medalist(s)	Ana Júlia Ferreira; Marcello Oliveira; Andrei Jessé; Maria Fuhrmann; Diogo Volkmann; Jennifer Almeida; Kayki Siqueira; Lara Pizarro; Miguel Marques	Brazil	6:08.52	
3rd place, bronze medalist(s)	Fiorela Rodríguez; Agustina López; Nicole Martínez; Lucía Martínez; Nicolás Villalba; Nicolás Invernizzi; Gabriel Yser; Alejo Giménez; Juan Iglesias	Paraguay	6:09.42	
4	Ingrid Marcipar; Agustín Annese; Catalina Deandrea; Florencia Duarte; Fernando Álvarez; Marcos Rojas; Elena Cerrudo; Martín Mansilla; Guadalupe Louzao	Argentina	6:11.08	
5	Claudia Tolón; Natalie Morales; Leah Almeida; Ana Jimenez; Ronny Álvarez; Henry Heredia; Leduar Suárez; Robert Fernandez; Roberto Paz	Cuba	6:38.23	
