= Belize at the 2025 Junior Pan American Games =

- IOC code: BIZ
- NOC: Belize Olympic and Commonwealth Games Association

in Asunción, Paraguay
- Competitors: 5 in 5 sports
- Medals: Gold 0 Silver 0 Bronze 0 Total 0

Junior Pan American Games appearances (overview)
- 2021; 2025

Belize competed at the 2025 Junior Pan American Games in Asunción from August 9 to 23, 2025.

The Belizean team consists of 5 athletes, however, the country failed to win a medal.

== Competitors ==
The following is the list of number of competitors (per gender) participating at the games per sport/discipline.

Sport	Men	Women	Total
Athletics	0	1	1
Canoeing	1	0	1
Cycling	1	0	1
Swimming	0	1	1
Weightlifting	1	0	1
Total	3	2	5

== See also ==
- Belize at the Junior Pan American Games
