= Canoeing at the 2025 Junior Pan American Games =

Canoeing at the 2025 Junior American Games
- Venue: Bahía de Asunción
- Start date: August 20, 2025
- End date: August 23, 2025
- No. of events: 16
- Competitors: 96

The canoeing events at the 2025 Junior Pan American Games were held at the Bahía de Asunción, located in the Olympic Park in the Greater Asuncion area. The events were contested between August 20 and 23, 2025.

Sixteen sprint events were contested, fourteen individual events (seven men and seven women) and two mixed. The latter two mixed events were added for the 2025 games. The winner of the Olympic events (K1 and C1) qualified for the 2027 Pan American Games in Lima, Peru.

== Qualification ==
A total of 96 athletes qualified for the events. Qualification was based on the results from the 2024 Pan American Junior and Under 23 Championship, held in Montevideo, Uruguay.

== Medal summary ==
=== Medal table ===
* Host nation (Paraguay)

Rank	Nation	Gold	Silver	Bronze	Total
1	Argentina	7	2	2	11
2	Chile	3	3	4	10
3	Cuba	3	3	3	9
4	Brazil	2	3	1	6
5	Mexico	1	2	2	5
6	Canada	0	2	1	3
7	Uruguay	0	1	2	3
8	Venezuela	0	0	1	1
Totals (8 entries)		16	16	16	48

=== Medalists ===
==== Men ====
Event	Gold	Silver	Bronze
C-1 500 metres	Aramís Sánchez; Argentina	Mateus Nunes; Brazil	Reinaldo Argüello; Venezuela
C-1 1000 metres	Aramís Sánchez; Argentina	Mateus Nunes; Brazil	José Gil; Mexico
C-2 500 metres	Brazil; Mateus Nunes; Lucas Espirito Santo	Cuba; Javier Requeiro; Elvis Reyes	Argentina; Aramís Sánchez; Santiago Piedras
K-1 500 metres	Sebastián Alveal; Chile	Julio Suárez; Cuba	Vicente Vergauven; Argentina
K-1 1000 metres	Sebastián Alveal; Chile	Vicente Vergauven; Argentina	Jérémy Lantz; Canada
K-2 500 metres	Argentina; Baltazar Itria; Vicente Vergauven	Uruguay; Tadeo Arca; Matias Maccio	Chile; Sebastián Alveal; Matteo Cossio
K-4 500 metres	Argentina; Baltazar Itria; Luca Micatrotta; Agustin Sánchez; Vicente Vergauven	Cuba; Carlos Abreu; Geduar Gonzalez; Anthony Lamadrid; Julio Suárez	Chile; Sebastián Alveal; Matteo Cossio; Matías Parra; Jerson Valenzuela

==== Women ====
Event	Gold	Silver	Bronze
C-1 200 metres	Yisnoly López; Cuba	Elizabeth Desrosiers; Canada	Lorrane Santos; Brazil
C-1 500 metres	Lorrane Santos; Brazil	Nicol Guzmán; Mexico	Yisnoly López; Cuba
C-2 500 metres	Cuba; Diorgina Castillo; Yisnoly López	Brazil; Maria do Livramento; Lorrane Santos	Chile; Valentina Cornejo; Sley Figueroa
K-1 200 metres	Paulina Barreiro; Argentina	Maira Toro; Chile	Emilia Milich; Uruguay
K-1 500 metres	Maira Toro; Chile	Paulina Barreiro; Argentina	Emilia Milich; Uruguay
K-2 500 metres	Mexico; Naomi Campos; Ana Hernandez	Chile; Fernanda Sepúlveda; Maira Toro	Cuba; Maria Alvarez; Lismary Bombino
K-4 500 metres	Argentina; Paulina Barreiro; Martina Catalano; Candela Velazquez; Priscila Vukonich	Mexico; Naomi Campos; Ana Hernandez; Daniela Salazar; Ana Ureña	Cuba; Maria Alvarez; Lismary Bombino; Sujailis Sardiñas; Melani Torres

==== Mixed ====
Event	Gold	Silver	Bronze
C-2 500 metres	Cuba; Javier Requeiro; Yisnoly López	Chile; Matías Jiménez; Sley Figueroa	Mexico; José Gil; Nicol Guzmán
K-2 500 metres	Argentina; Agustin Sánchez; Paulina Barreiro	Canada; Jérémy Lantz; Brianna Smith	Chile; Sebastián Alveal; Maira Toro

== Results ==
=== Men's events ===
==== Men's C-1 500 metres ====
Final – August 21

Rank	Name	Nation	Time
1st place, gold medalist(s)	Aramis Sánchez	Argentina	1:51.41
2nd place, silver medalist(s)	Mateus Nunes	Brazil	1:51.44
3rd place, bronze medalist(s)	Reinaldo Argüello	Venezuela	1:56.54
4	Joaquín Lagos	Chile	1:56.70
5	José Gil	Mexico	1:56.76
6	Javier Requeiro	Cuba	1:59.74
7	Dylan Godoy	Guatemala	2:02.63
8	Cristián Ávila	Colombia	2:08.75

==== Men's C-1 1000 metres ====
Final – August 20

Rank	Name	Nation	Time
1st place, gold medalist(s)	Aramis Sánchez	Argentina	4:17.18
2nd place, silver medalist(s)	Mateus Nunes	Brazil	4:23.98
3rd place, bronze medalist(s)	José Gil	Mexico	4:26.33
4	Matías Jiménez	Chile	4:26.85
5	Elvis Reyes	Cuba	4:28.48
6	César Iglesia	Venezuela	4:37.75
7	Dylan Godoy	Guatemala	4:47.13
8	Cristián Ávila	Colombia	5:14.44

==== Men's C-2 500 metres ====
Final – August 23

Rank	Name	Nation	Time
1st place, gold medalist(s)	Mateus Nunes; Lucas Espirito Santo	Brazil	2:04.46
2nd place, silver medalist(s)	Javier Requeiro; Elvis Reyes	Cuba	2:06.82
3rd place, bronze medalist(s)	Aramis Sánchez; Santiago Piedras	Argentina	2:07.14
4	Reinaldo Argüello; César Iglesia	Venezuela	2:08.84
5	José Gil; Emiliano López	Mexico	2:30.36
6	Joaquín Lagos; Matías Jiménez	Chile	2:33.18
7	Dylan Godoy; Luis Carrera	Guatemala	2:33.30

==== Men's K-1 500 metres ====
Heat 1 – August 21

Rank	Name	Nationality	Time	Notes
1	Vicente Vergauven	Argentina	1:43.34	F
2	Julio Suarez	Cuba	1:45.46	F
3	Daniel Román	Venezuela	1:53.10	SF
4	Raúl López	Peru	1:59.12	SF
5	Daniel Cruz	Belize	1:59.52	SF
6	Tomás Escobar	Paraguay	2:06.35	SF

Heat 2 – August 21

Rank	Name	Nationality	Time	Notes
1	Sebastián Alveal	Chile	1:43.08	F
2	Jorge Pereira	Uruguay	1:44.31	F
3	Jérémy Lantz	Canada	1:44.77	SF
4	Jahir Zuñiga	Mexico	1:48.28	SF
5	Juan Torres	Colombia	1:48.29	SF

Semifinal – August 21

Rank	Name	Nationality	Time	Notes
1	Jérémy Lantz	Canada	1:49.68	F
2	Juan Torres	Colombia	1:49.75	F
3	Daniel Román	Venezuela	1:50.04	F
4	Jahir Zuñiga	Mexico	1:50.43	F
5	Tomás Escobar	Paraguay	1:59.77	
6	Raúl López	Peru	2:01.65	
7	Daniel Cruz	Belize	2:04.22	

Final – August 21

Rank	Name	Nationality	Time	Notes
1st place, gold medalist(s)	Sebastián Alveal	Chile	1:42.29	
2nd place, silver medalist(s)	Julio Suarez	Cuba	1:43.31	
3rd place, bronze medalist(s)	Vicente Vergauven	Argentina	1:44.29	
4	Jorge Pereira	Uruguay	1:46.11	
5	Jahir Zuñiga	Mexico	1:47.05	
6	Daniel Román	Venezuela	1:48.62	
7	Jérémy Lantz	Canada	1:49.23	
8	Juan Torres	Colombia	1:49.72	

==== Men's K-1 1000 metres ====
Heat 1 – August 20

Rank	Name	Nationality	Time	Notes
1	Sebastián Alveal	Chile	3:58.57	F
2	Vicente Vergauven	Argentina	4:02.19	F
3	Julio Suarez	Cuba	4:11.31	SF
4	Diego Ortiz	Paraguay	4:34.12	SF
5	Matías Maccio	Uruguay	4:40.27	SF
6	Daniel Cruz	Belize	4:47.11	SF

Heat 2 – August 20

Rank	Name	Nationality	Time	Notes
1	Jérémy Lantz	Canada	4:07.79	F
2	Jahir Zuñiga	Mexico	4:10.42	F
3	Juan Torres	Colombia	4:15.92	SF
4	Daniel Román	Venezuela	4:15.43	SF
5	Raúl López	Peru	4:40.33	SF

Semifinal – August 20

Rank	Name	Nationality	Time	Notes
1	Julio Suarez	Cuba	4:12.31	F
2	Daniel Román	Venezuela	4:12.93	F
3	Juan Torres	Colombia	4:15.92	F
4	Matías Maccio	Uruguay	4:27.96	F
5	Raúl López	Peru	4:33.38	
6	Diego Ortiz	Paraguay	4:34.36	
7	Daniel Cruz	Belize	4:48.83	

Final – August 20

Rank	Name	Nationality	Time	Notes
1st place, gold medalist(s)	Sebastián Alveal	Chile	3:52.65	
2nd place, silver medalist(s)	Vicente Vergauven	Argentina	3:54.88	
3rd place, bronze medalist(s)	Jérémy Lantz	Canada	3:56.88	
4	Julio Suarez	Cuba	3:57.82	
5	Jahir Zuñiga	Mexico	4:02.05	
6	Matías Maccio	Uruguay	4:06.67	
7	Daniel Román	Venezuela	4:11.99	
8	Juan Torres	Colombia	4:17.47	

==== Men's K-2 500 metres ====
Heat 1 – August 22

Rank	Name	Nationality	Time	Notes
1	Vicente Vergauven; Baltazar Itria	Argentina	1:36.86	F
2	Luis Arias; Daniel Román	Venezuela	1:37.95	F
3	Sebastián Zapata; Dairon Ardila	Colombia	1:39.04	SF
4	Carlos Abreu; Anthony Lamadrid	Cuba	1:46.11	SF
5	Raúl López; Jhon Córdova	Peru	1:50.84	SF

Heat 2 – August 22

Rank	Name	Nationality	Time	Notes
1	Sebastián Alveal; Matteo Cossio	Chile	1:38.60	F
2	Matías Maccio; Tadeo Arca	Uruguay	1:49.24	F
3	Tomás Escobar; Rodrigo Florentín	Paraguay	DNF	
4	Juan Rodríguez; Diego Popa	Mexico	DSQ	

Semifinal – August 22

Rank	Name	Nationality	Time	Notes
1	Sebastián Zapata; Dairon Ardila	Colombia	1:49.95	F
2	Carlos Abreu; Anthony Lamadrid	Cuba	1:50.60	F
3	Raúl López; Jhon Córdova	Peru	1:58.09	F

Final – August 22

Rank	Name	Nationality	Time	Notes
1st place, gold medalist(s)	Vicente Vergauven; Baltazar Itria	Argentina	1:45.14	
2nd place, silver medalist(s)	Matías Maccio; Tadeo Arca	Uruguay	1:49.14	
3rd place, bronze medalist(s)	Sebastián Alveal; Matteo Cossio	Chile	1:49.33	
4	Luis Arias; Daniel Román	Venezuela	1:52.50	
5	Sebastián Zapata; Dairon Ardila	Colombia	1:53.94	
6	Carlos Abreu; Anthony Lamadrid	Cuba	2:04.96	
7	Raúl López; Jhon Córdova	Peru	2:11.49	

==== Men's K-4 500 metres ====
Final – August 22

Rank	Name	Nation	Time
1st place, gold medalist(s)	Vicente Vergauven; Luca Micatriotta; Agustín Sánchez; Baltazar Itria	Argentina	1:24.10
2nd place, silver medalist(s)	Carlos Abreu; Julio Suárez; Anthony Lamadrid; Geduar González	Cuba	1:26.36
3rd place, bronze medalist(s)	Jerson Valenzuela; Matías Parra; Sebastián Alveal; Matteo Cossio	Chile	1:26.51
4	Juan Rodríguez; Diego Popa; Mauricio Ureña; Jahir Zuñiga	Mexico	1:26.97
5	Felipe Agüero; Matías Maccio; Tadeo Arca; Jorge Pereira	Uruguay	1:29.71
6	Santiago Manrique; Juan Torres; Sebastián Zapata; Dairon Ardila	Colombia	1:32.22
7	Diego Ortiz; Tomás Escobar; Rodrigo Florentín; Jonathan Hermosilla	Paraguay	1:36.59

=== Women's events ===
==== Women's C-1 200 metres ====
Heat 1 – August 20

Rank	Name	Nationality	Time	Notes
1	Yisnoly López	Cuba	51.34	F
2	Lorrane Santos	Brazil	52.89	F
3	Luismary Santamaria	Venezuela	57.75	SF
4	Melisa Carrillo	Colombia	58.49	SF
5	Johana Padilla	Peru	1:00.81	SF

Heat 2 – August 20

Rank	Name	Nationality	Time	Notes
1	Élizabeth Desrosiers	Canada	52.10	F
2	Nicol Guzmán	Mexico	53.16	F
3	Sley Figueroa	Chile	53.55	SF
4	Tais Trimarchi	Argentina	1:03.48	SF

Semifinal – August 20

Rank	Name	Nationality	Time	Notes
1	Sley Figueroa	Chile	54.60	F
2	Luismary Santamaria	Venezuela	56.36	F
3	Melisa Carrillo	Colombia	59.19	F
4	Johana Padilla	Peru	1:00.22	F
5	Tais Trimarchi	Argentina	1:00.25	

Final – August 20

Rank	Name	Nationality	Time	Notes
1st place, gold medalist(s)	Yisnoly López	Cuba	49.79	
2nd place, silver medalist(s)	Élizabeth Desrosiers	Canada	50.07	
3rd place, bronze medalist(s)	Lorrane Santos	Brazil	50.67	
4	Nicol Guzmán	Mexico	51.33	
5	Sley Figueroa	Chile	52.61	
6	Luismary Santamaria	Venezuela	54.52	
7	Melisa Carrillo	Colombia	57.72	
8	Johana Padilla	Peru	58.75	

==== Women's C-1 500 metres ====
Heat 1 – August 21

Rank	Name	Nationality	Time	Notes
1	Lorrane Santos	Brazil	2:15.31	F
2	Nicol Guzmán	Mexico	2:17.19	F
3	Valentina Cornejo	Chile	2:25.20	SF
4	Sabrina Zuccoli	Argentina	2:35.58	SF
5	Johana Padilla	Peru	2:42.92	SF

Heat 2 – August 21

Rank	Name	Nationality	Time	Notes
1	Yisnoly López	Cuba	2:20.06	F
2	Élizabeth Desrosiers	Canada	2:23.88	F
3	Luismary Santamaria	Venezuela	2:28.38	SF
4	Maira Altamiranda	Colombia	2:37.53	SF

Semifinal – August 21

Rank	Name	Nationality	Time	Notes
1	Valentina Cornejo	Chile	2:26.54	F
2	Luismary Santamaria	Venezuela	2:29.60	F
3	Sabrina Zuccoli	Argentina	2:34.27	F
4	Maira Altamiranda	Colombia	2:37.48	F
5	Johana Padilla	Peru	2:49.26	

Final – August 21

Rank	Name	Nationality	Time	Notes
1st place, gold medalist(s)	Lorrane Santos	Brazil	2:12.59	
2nd place, silver medalist(s)	Nicol Guzmán	Mexico	2:14.49	
3rd place, bronze medalist(s)	Yisnoly López	Cuba	2:19.32	
4	Élizabeth Desrosiers	Canada	2:19.55	
5	Luismary Santamaria	Venezuela	2:26.44	
6	Valentina Cornejo	Chile	2:28.34	
7	Maira Altamiranda	Colombia	2:37.77	
8	Sabrina Zuccoli	Argentina	2:37.95	

==== Women's C-2 500 metres ====
Final – August 23

Rank	Name	Nation	Time
1st place, gold medalist(s)	Diorgina Castillo; Yisnoly López	Cuba	2:24.33
2nd place, silver medalist(s)	Maria do Livramento; Lorrane Santos	Brazil	2:26.99
3rd place, bronze medalist(s)	Sley Figueroa; Valentina Cornejo	Chile	2:27.33
4	Neiverlyn Sequeira; Luismary Santamaria	Venezuela	2:43.00
5	Tais Trimarchi; Sabrina Zuccoli	Argentina	2:46.96
6	Maira Altamiranda; Melisa Carrillo	Colombia	2:57.97
7	Nicol Guzmán; Ana Martínez	Mexico	DNF

==== Women's K-1 200 metres ====
Heat 1 – August 20

Rank	Name	Nationality	Time	Notes
1	María Álvarez	Cuba	48.38	F
2	Emilia Milich	Uruguay	48.70	F
3	Sandra Scalia	Colombia	50.02	F
4	Brianna Smith	Canada	52.13	SF
5	Nataly González	Guatemala	52.39	SF
6	Wuillianny Canache	Venezuela	52.41	SF
7	Kyara Vargas	Peru	58.47	SF

Heat 2 – August 23

Rank	Name	Nationality	Time	Notes
1	Paulina Barreiro	Argentina	47.82	F
2	Maira Toro	Chile	48.27	F
3	Ana Hernández	Mexico	49.55	F
4	Liliana Cárdenas	Ecuador	50.72	SF
5	Yaimily Alvelo	Puerto Rico	58.21	SF
6	Melody Hermosilla	Paraguay	59.16	SF
7	Cristal Díaz	Dominican Republic	1:05.98	SF

Semifinal – August 21

Rank	Name	Nationality	Time	Notes
1	Liliana Cárdenas	Ecuador	50.29	F
2	Wuillianny Canache	Venezuela	50.47	F
3	Brianna Smith	Canada	51.12	
4	Nataly González	Guatemala	51.67	
5	Kyara Vargas	Peru	56.58	
6	Melody Hermosilla	Paraguay	58.08	
7	Yaimily Alvelo	Puerto Rico	58.13	
8	Cristal Díaz	Dominican Republic	1:06.06	

Final – August 21

Rank	Name	Nationality	Time	Notes
1st place, gold medalist(s)	Paulina Barreiro	Argentina	45.71	
2nd place, silver medalist(s)	Maira Toro	Chile	45.87	
3rd place, bronze medalist(s)	Emilia Milich	Uruguay	46.93	
4	Ana Hernández	Mexico	46.94	
5	María Álvarez	Cuba	47.10	
6	Sandra Scalia	Colombia	48.07	
7	Liliana Cárdenas	Ecuador	48.19	
8	Wuillianny Canache	Venezuela	48.52	

==== Women's K-1 500 metres ====
Heat 1 – August 21

Rank	Name	Nationality	Time	Notes
1	Maira Toro	Chile	2:01.21	F
2	Emilia Milich	Uruguay	2:01.57	F
3	María Álvarez	Cuba	2:02.67	F
4	Brianna Smith	Canada	2:04.02	SF
5	Wuillianny Canache	Venezuela	2:05.99	SF
6	Nataly González	Guatemala	2:16.03	SF
7	Melody Hermosilla	Paraguay	2:20.75	SF

Heat 2 – August 21

Rank	Name	Nationality	Time	Notes
1	Ana Hernández	Mexico	2:02.37	F
2	Paulina Barreiro	Argentina	2:03.36	F
3	Liliana Cárdenas	Ecuador	2:04.42	F
4	Sandra Scalia	Colombia	2:08.48	SF
5	Yaimily Alvelo	Puerto Rico	2:17.40	SF
6	Kyara Vargas	Peru	2:21.56	SF
7	Cristal Díaz	Dominican Republic	2:40.34	SF

Semifinal – August 21

Rank	Name	Nationality	Time	Notes
1	Wuillianny Canache	Venezuela	2:04.67	F
2	Brianna Smith	Canada	2:05.55	F
3	Sandra Scalia	Colombia	2:09.01	
4	Nataly González	Guatemala	2:10.93	
5	Yaimily Alvelo	Puerto Rico	2:17.13	
6	Melody Hermosilla	Paraguay	2:18.82	
7	Kyara Vargas	Peru	2:19.52	
8	Cristal Díaz	Dominican Republic	2:44.40	

Final – August 21

Rank	Name	Nationality	Time	Notes
1st place, gold medalist(s)	Maira Toro	Chile	2:01.68	
2nd place, silver medalist(s)	Paulina Barreiro	Argentina	2:02.51	
3rd place, bronze medalist(s)	Emilia Milich	Uruguay	2:03.25	
4	Ana Hernández	Mexico	2:05.13	
5	María Álvarez	Cuba	2:05.25	
6	Liliana Cárdenas	Ecuador	2:06.78	
7	Wuillianny Canache	Venezuela	2:07.22	
8	Brianna Smith	Canada	2:08.15	

==== Women's K-2 500 metres ====
Heat 1 – August 22

Rank	Name	Nationality	Time	Notes
1	Ana Hernández; Naomi Campos	Mexico	1:56.61	F
2	Priscila Vukonich; Candela Velazquez	Argentina	1:58.32	F
3	Nataly González; Kely Bolvito	Guatemala	2:04.19	SF
4	Milagros Croci; Camila Ávila	Uruguay	2:07.68	SF
5	Flavia Velazquez; Yasmín Rojas	Paraguay	DNF	

Heat 2 – August 22

Rank	Name	Nationality	Time	Notes
1	Maira Toro; Fernanda Sepúlveda	Chile	1:57.72	F
2	Lismary Bombino; María Álvarez	Cuba	1:57.79	F
3	Sandra Scalia; Sharick Agudelo	Colombia	2:04.07	SF
4	Liliana Cárdenas; Ginger Aviles	Ecuador	2:09.91	SF

Semifinal – August 22

Rank	Name	Nationality	Time	Notes
1	Nataly González; Kely Bolvito	Guatemala	2:03.57	F
2	Sandra Scalia; Sharick Agudelo	Colombia	2:05.94	F
3	Liliana Cárdenas; Ginger Aviles	Ecuador	2:09.14	F
4	Milagros Croci; Camila Ávila	Uruguay	DSQ	

Final – August 22

Rank	Name	Nationality	Time	Notes
1st place, gold medalist(s)	Ana Hernández; Naomi Campos	Mexico	1:59.61	
2nd place, silver medalist(s)	Maira Toro; Fernanda Sepúlveda	Chile	2:02.79	
3rd place, bronze medalist(s)	Lismary Bombino; María Álvarez	Cuba	2:05.34	
4	Priscila Vukonich; Candela Velazquez	Argentina	2:08.66	
5	Nataly González; Kely Bolvito	Guatemala	2:11.78	
6	Sandra Scalia; Sharick Agudelo	Colombia	2:12.71	
7	Liliana Cárdenas; Ginger Aviles	Ecuador	2:17.79	

==== Women's K-4 500 metres ====
Final – August 22

Rank	Name	Nation	Time
1st place, gold medalist(s)	Priscila Vukonich; Martina Catalano; Paulina Barreiro; Candela Velazquez	Argentina	1:39.08
2nd place, silver medalist(s)	Ana Hernández; Naomi Campos; Daniela Salazar; Ana Ureña	Mexico	1:41.25
3rd place, bronze medalist(s)	Lismary Bombino; Sujailis Sardiñas; María Álvarez; Melani Torres	Cuba	1:41.45
4	Emilia Milich; Milagros Croci; Camila Ávila; Sofía de Lima	Uruguay	1:42.43
5	Maira Toro; Fernanda Sepúlveda; Francisca Medina; Agustina Díaz	Chile	1:44.20
6	Melody Hermosilla; Flavia Velazquez; Violeta Castillo; Yasmín Rojas	Paraguay	2:05.00

=== Mixed events ===
==== Mixed C-2 500 metres ====
Final – August 23

Rank	Name	Nation	Time
1st place, gold medalist(s)	Yisnoly López; Javier Requeiro	Cuba	2:14.61
2nd place, silver medalist(s)	Sley Figueroa; Matías Jiménez	Chile	2:18.75
3rd place, bronze medalist(s)	Nicol Guzmán; José Gil	Mexico	2:19.61
4	Luismary Santamaria; Reinaldo Argüello	Venezuela	2:22.64
5	Tais Trimarchi; Santiago Piedras	Argentina	2:25.36
6	Lucas Espirito Santo; Lorrane Santos	Brazil	2:30.49
7	Cristián Ávila; Melisa Carrillo	Colombia	2:41.94

==== Mixed K-2 500 metres ====
Heat 1 – August 22

Rank	Name	Nationality	Time	Notes
1	Agustín Sánchez; Paulina Barreiro	Argentina	1:44.50	F
2	Brianna Smith; Jérémy Lantz	Canada	1:44.56	F
3	Ana Hernández; Diego Popa	Mexico	1:51.98	SF
4	Sandra Scalia; Juan Torres	Colombia	2:01.91	SF
5	Kyara Vargas; Jhon Cordova	Peru	2:05.56	SF

Heat 2 – August 22

Rank	Name	Nationality	Time	Notes
1	Maira Toro; Sebastián Alveal	Chile	1:45.35	F
2	María Álvarez; Julio Suárez	Cuba	1:46.72	F
3	Jorge Pereira; Emilia Milich	Uruguay	1:47.89	SF
4	Wuillianny Canache; Santiago Ramos	Venezuela	2:06.18	SF
5	Melody Hermosilla; Rodrigo Florentín	Paraguay	2:11.06	SF

Semifinal – August 22

Rank	Name	Nationality	Time	Notes
1	Ana Hernández; Diego Popa	Mexico	1:53.74	F
2	Jorge Pereira; Emilia Milich	Uruguay	1:56.04	F
3	Sandra Scalia; Juan Torres	Colombia	1:59.84	F
4	Wuillianny Canache; Santiago Ramos	Venezuela	2:00.51	F
5	Melody Hermosilla; Rodrigo Florentín	Paraguay	2:08.39	
6	Kyara Vargas; Jhon Cordova	Peru	2:08.84	

Final – August 22

Rank	Name	Nationality	Time	Notes
1st place, gold medalist(s)	Agustín Sánchez; Paulina Barreiro	Argentina	2:02.31	
2nd place, silver medalist(s)	Brianna Smith; Jérémy Lantz	Canada	2:05.41	
3rd place, bronze medalist(s)	Maira Toro; Sebastián Alveal	Chile	2:09.66	
4	Jorge Pereira; Emilia Milich	Uruguay	2:10.50	
5	María Álvarez; Julio Suárez	Cuba	2:15.20	
6	Sandra Scalia; Juan Torres	Colombia	2:17.92	
7	Ana Hernández; Diego Popa	Mexico	DNF	
8	Wuillianny Canache; Santiago Ramos	Venezuela	DNF	
