= Luciano García =

Mexican soldier and politician

2ºGovernor of Mexican Tejas
- In office June 16, 1823 – October 12, 1823
- Preceded by: José Félix Trespalacios
- Succeeded by: Rafael Gonzales

Personal details
- Profession: Soldier and Political

Luciano Garcia was a Mexican soldier and politician who served in various Texas political positions: He was the interim governor (June - October 1823), commander general (1823) and political chief (1824) of Texas. During his short administrative period in Texas, he favoured the election of Texans to the Mexican Congress, in order to represent the province.

== Career ==
García lived in Nuevo Santander, New Spain. He joined the cavalry of the region when he was young and reached the rank of lieutenant colonel.

García moved to La Bahía, Texas, following the orders of the military commander Joaquín de Arredondo, with the objective of reorganizing the presidio in the territory.

García got the position of interim governor of the province in June 1823.

On July 17 of that year, García appointed Felipe Enrique Neri, a Surinamese nobleman of Dutch origin known as Baron de Bastrop, to the position of commissioner. Neri was in charge of granting land titles to the businessmen who requested it. Thus, Neri avoided conflicts between businessmen who owned land. Only nine days later, García founded San Felipe de Austin, which would later become the capital of the American colony of Texas. In addition, he established, for the first time, the electoral system that allowed the choice of certain individuals from Texas to the constituent Congress of Mexico, where they served as representatives of the province. His governmental period ended in October 1823.

In 1823, after of leaving the governor's charge, Garcia assumed the post of commander general of Texas, and in 1824 he served as political chief of that territory. During his tenure as political chief, he helped the American colonists who were seeking independence from Texas.

Garcia abandoned San Antonio politics in 1826 and become a farmer.
