= Uruguay at the 2025 Junior Pan American Games =

- IOC code: URU
- NOC: Uruguayan Olympic Committee

in Asunción, Paraguay
- Competitors: 121
- Flag bearers (opening): Julieta González; Diego Aranda
- Flag bearers (closing): Tomás Dotta; Emilia Milich
- Medals Ranked 16th: Gold 1 Silver 6 Bronze 6 Total 13

Junior Pan American Games appearances (overview)
- 2021; 2025

Uruguay competed at the 2025 Junior Pan American Games in Asunción from August 9 to 23, 2025.

The Uruguayan team consisted of 121 athletes.

== Medals by sport ==
Sport	Gold	Silver	Bronze	Total
Rowing	1	0	1	2
Canoeing	0	1	2	3
Karate	0	1	1	2
Taekwondo	0	1	1	2
Athletics	0	1	0	1
Cycling	0	1	0	1
Rugby sevens	0	1	0	1
Swimming	0	0	1	1
Totals (8 entries)	1	6	6	13

== Medalists ==
The following Uruguayan competitors won medals at the games.

Medal	Name	Sport	Event	Date
Gold	Luciano García	Rowing	Men's Single Sculls (M1X)	August 13
Silver	María Sara Grippoli	Taekwondo	Women's Kyorugi -49Kg	August 15
Silver	Ciro Pérez	Cycling	Men's Road Race	August 17
Silver	Uruguay national U20 rugby 7 team: Alfonso Perillo; Mateo Acosta; Francisco Gallo; Bruno Baccino; Manuel Parodi; Valentin Vargas; Joaquin Fresnedo; Iván Peters; Federico Lawlor; Francisco Landauer; Manuel Martínez; Andrew Hobbins	Rugby sevens	Men's Team	August 17
Silver	Manuela Rotundo	Athletics	Women's Javelin Throw	August 18
Silver	Tomás Dotta	Karate	Men's -84kg	August 21
Silver	Matías Maccio; Tadeo Arca	Canoeing	Men's K2 500m	August 23
Bronze	Cloe Callorda	Rowing	Women's Single Sculls (W1X)	August 10
Bronze	Angelina Solari	Swimming	Women's 100m Freestyle	August 12
Bronze	Matías López	Taekwondo	Men's Kyorugi -68kg	August 15
Bronze	Emilia Milich	Canoeing	Women's K1 200m	August 20
Bronze	Emilia Milich	Canoeing	Women's K1 500m	August 21
Bronze	Bruno Ayphassorho	Karate	Men's -67kg	August 22

== See also ==
- Uruguay at the Junior Pan American Games
