= Golf at the 2025 Junior Pan American Games =

Golf at the 2025 Junior American Games
- Venue: Asunción Golf Club
- Start date: August 19, 2025
- End date: August 23, 2025
- No. of events: 3 (1 men, 1 women, 1 mixed)
- Competitors: 56 from 18 nations

The golf events at the 2025 Junior Pan American Games were held at the Asunción Golf Club in Asunción. The event were contested between August 18 and 23, 2025. The sport of golf was contested for the first time at the Junior Pan American Games.

A total of three events (men's individual, women's individual and mixed team) were contested. The winner of each individual event qualified for the 2027 Pan American Games in Lima, Peru.

== Qualification ==
A country's quota spots were determined using the World Amateur Golf Rankings as of April 30, 2025. A country could enter up to two athletes per gender. Athletes must be 21 years of age or less to compete.

== Medal summary ==
=== Medal table ===
* Host nation (Paraguay)

Rank	Nation	Gold	Silver	Bronze	Total
1	Guatemala	2	0	0	2
2	Peru	1	1	0	2
3	Paraguay*	0	2	1	3
4	Colombia	0	0	1	1
4	Puerto Rico	0	0	1	1
Totals (5 entries)		3	3	3	9

=== Medalists ===
Event	Gold	Silver	Bronze
Men's individual	Gabriel Palacios; Guatemala	Benjamín Fernández; Paraguay	Alejandro Caraballo; Puerto Rico
Women's individual	Elzbieta Aldana; Guatemala	Ariana Urrea; Peru	Victoria Livieres; Paraguay
Mixed team	Peru; Ariana Urrea; Alejandro del Valle; Tiago Ledgard; Alexa Vegas	Paraguay; Benjamín Fernández; Franco Fernández; María Inés Jaime; Victoria Livieres	Colombia; Cristina Álvarez; Daniela Páez; Tomás Restrepo; Emilio Vélez

== Results ==
=== Men's individual ===
Date: August 21–23

Rank	Name	Nation	Round 1	Round 2	Round 3	Total
1st place, gold medalist(s)	Gabriel Palacios	Guatemala	69	71	76	216 (E)
2nd place, silver medalist(s)	Benjamín Fernández	Paraguay	66	77	75	218 (+2)
3rd place, bronze medalist(s)	Alejandro Caraballo	Puerto Rico	69	73	76	218 (+2)
4	Franco Fernández	Paraguay	73	71	75	219 (+3)
5	Emilio Vélez	Colombia	75	74	72	221 (+5)
5	Tomás Restrepo	Colombia	71	73	77	221 (+5)
7	Kelvin Emir Hernandez	Puerto Rico	67	76	82	225 (+9)
8	Andrés Martínez	Venezuela	71	79	76	226 (+10)
9	Matías Calderón	Guatemala	75	77	77	229 (+13)
10	Martín Sandoval	Chile	77	74	79	230 (+14)
11	Elias Mardeni	Costa Rica	75	77	82	234 (+18)
12	Jeremias Porta	Argentina	81	76	78	235 (+19)
12	Matias Monasterio	Bolivia	74	77	84	235 (+19)
14	Sebastian Kalaf	Dominican Republic	80	76	80	236 (+20)
14	Oliver Betschart	Bermuda	79	78	79	236 (+20)
16	Gustavo Giacometti	Brazil	75	83	79	237 (+21)
17	Alejandro del Valle	Peru	76	78	84	238 (+22)
18	Eduardo Kuri	Mexico	74	82	83	239 (+23)
18	Tiago Ledgard	Peru	79	73	87	239 (+23)
18	Rodrigo Huerta	Dominican Republic	81	72	86	239 (+23)
21	Joaquín Sandoval	Chile	76	85	79	240 (+24)
21	Guilherme Ziccardi	Brazil	77	82	81	240 (+24)
23	Estanislao Maradei	Argentina	78	83	80	241 (+25)
23	José Mauricio Carletta	Venezuela	73	80	88	241 (+21)
25	Juan José Rodríguez	Panama	78	88	78	244 (+28)
25	Trey Jonah Williams	Jamaica	82	80	82	244 (+28)
25	Lucca Mateo Carrasco	Mexico	74	80	90	244 (+28)
28	Gael Ormachea	Bolivia	76	86	88	250 (+34)
29	Juan Pablo Alvarado	Costa Rica	82	87	89	258 (+42)
30	Jerseem Boodram	Trinidad and Tobago	83	90	94	267 (+51)
31	Carlos Enrique Sacre	Panama	89	92	93	274 (+58)

=== Women's individual ===
Date: August 21–23

Rank	Name	Nation	Round 1	Round 2	Round 3	Total
1st place, gold medalist(s)	Elzbieta Aldana	Guatemala	75	76	73	224 (+8)
2nd place, silver medalist(s)	Ariana Urrea	Peru	74	76	79	229 (+13)
3rd place, bronze medalist(s)	Victoria Livieres	Paraguay	75	75	80	230 (+14)
4	María Tablante	Venezuela	77	77	77	231 (+15)
5	Malena Castro	Argentina	73	80	81	234 (+18)
5	María José Barragan	Mexico	77	78	79	234 (+18)
7	Maria Eduarda Rocha	Brazil	79	79	80	238 (+22)
7	Mattea Issa	Jamaica	75	75	88	238 (+22)
9	Mercedes Aldana	Argentina	79	78	82	239 (+23)
10	Maria Paz Marques	Uruguay	84	80	77	241 (+25)
11	Daniela Páez	Colombia	78	86	78	242 (+26)
11	Victoria Suarez	Bolivia	80	77	85	242 (+26)
13	Carolina Mailhos	Uruguay	75	80	88	243 (+27)
14	Isabella Flores	Venezuela	81	86	77	244 (+28)
14	Colomba Vassallo	Chile	76	86	82	244 (+28)
14	Arabella Lopez	Puerto Rico	78	83	83	244 (+28)
17	Alexa Vegas	Peru	81	81	83	245 (+29)
17	Sofia Blanco	Bolivia	84	80	81	245 (+29)
19	Constanza Figueroa	Chile	84	78	84	246 (+30)
20	Camila Negroni	Puerto Rico	75	82	91	248 (+32)
21	María Inés Jaime	Paraguay	88	80	82	250 (+34)
22	Maria Eugênia Peres	Brazil	85	85	82	252 (+36)
22	Daniela Hernández	Guatemala	89	81	85	252 (+36)
22	Regina Olvera	Mexico	82	81	87	252 (+36)

=== Mixed team ===
Date: August 19–21

Rank	Nation	Name	Round 1	Round 2	Total
1st place, gold medalist(s)	Peru	Alejandro del Valle (M); Tiago Ledgard (M); Ariana Urrea (W); Alexa Vegas (W)	144; 79; 71; 73; 90	143; 85; 71; 72; 81	287 (−1)
2nd place, silver medalist(s)	Paraguay	Benjamín Fernández (M); Franco Fernández (M); María Inés Jaime (W); Victoria Livieres (W)	144; 67; 70; 80; 77	148; 74; 71; 79; 77	292 (+4)
3rd place, bronze medalist(s)	Colombia	Tomás Restrepo (M); Emilio Vélez (M); Cristina Álvarez (W); Daniela Páez (W)	145; 69; 75; 83; 76	150; 71 – 79; 79	295 (+7)
4	Argentina	Estanislao Maradei (M); Jeremias Porta (M); Mercedes Aldana (W); Malena Castro (W)	152; 80; 78; 74; 76	146; 84; 77; 69; 72	298 (+10)
4	Chile	Joaquín Sandoval (M); Martín Sandoval (M); Constanza Figueroa (W); Colomba Vassallo (W)	151; 72; 72; 79; 96	147; 71; 75; 76; 83	298 (+10)
6	Guatemala	Matías Calderón (M); Gabriel Palacios (M); Elzbieta Aldana (W); Daniela Hernández (W)	150; 72; 74; 80; 78	149; 75; 70; 79; 86	299 (+11)
6	Venezuela	José Mauricio Carletta (M); Andrés Martínez (M); Isabella Flores (W); María Tablante (W)	149; 83; 75; 79; 74	150; 74; 76; 86; 76	299 (+11)
6	Brazil	Gustavo Giacometti (M); Guilherme Ziccardi (M); Maria Eugênia Peres (W); Maria Eduarda Rocha (W)	147; 75; 73; 82; 74	152; 79; 76; 83; 76	299 (+11)
9	Mexico	Lucca Mateo Carrasco (M); Eduardo Kuri (M); María José Barragan (W); Regina Olvera (W)	157; 76; 77; 81; 87	148; 70; 74; 78; 89	305 (+17)
10	Bolivia	Matias Monasterio (M); Gael Ormachea (M); Sofia Blanco (W); Victoria Suarez (W)	153; 75; 82; 78; 85	158; 77; 67; 81; 81	311 (+23)
11	Puerto Rico	Alejandro Caraballo (M); Kelvin Emir Hernandez (M); Arabella Lopez (W); Camila Negroni (W)	160; 78; 78; 82; 87	157; 76; 80; 87; 81	317 (+29)
12	Jamaica	Trey Jonah Williams (M); Mattea Issa (W)	161; 81; 80	161; 80; 81	322 (+34)

M = men, W = women
