= Judo at the 2025 Junior Pan American Games =

Judo at the 2025 Junior American Games
- Venue: Olympic Training Centre
- Start date: August 10, 2025
- End date: August 13, 2025
- No. of events: 15
- Competitors: 112

The judo events at the 2025 Junior Pan American Games were held at the Olympic Training Centre, located in the Olympic Park in Luque, in the Greater Asuncion area. The events were contested between August 10 and 13, 2025.

Fifteen events were contested, seven for men, seven for women, and one mixed team event. The winner of each event qualified for the 2027 Pan American Games in Lima, Peru.

== Qualification ==
A total of 112 athletes qualified for the events (56 men and 56 women). Eight athletes qualified for each weight category. Qualification was based on a points system, taking in consideration the placing and participation of the athletes in multiple Junior Pan American Cups, as well as the 2024 and 2025 Junior Pan American Championship, held in Rio de Janeiro, Brazil and Lima, Peru, respectively.

== Medal summary ==
=== Medal table ===
* Host nation (Paraguay)

Rank	Nation	Gold	Silver	Bronze	Total
1	Brazil	12	1	2	15
2	Colombia	1	2	5	8
3	Cuba	1	2	1	4
4	Ecuador	1	1	1	3
5	United States	0	4	5	9
6	Venezuela	0	1	5	6
7	Canada	0	1	3	4
7	Mexico	0	1	3	4
9	Chile	0	1	2	3
10	Dominican Republic	0	1	0	1
11	Argentina	0	0	1	1
11	Bahamas	0	0	1	1
11	Peru	0	0	1	1
Totals (13 entries)		15	15	30	60

=== Medalists ===
==== Men ====
Event	Gold	Silver	Bronze
–60 kg	Jonathan Benavides; Ecuador	Christopher Velazco; United States	Eduardo Sagastegui; Mexico
–60 kg	Jonathan Benavides; Ecuador	Christopher Velazco; United States	Lucas Takaki; Brazil
–66 kg	Bruno Nóbrega; Brazil	Jacob Yang; United States	Jhordan Vanegas; Colombia
–66 kg	Bruno Nóbrega; Brazil	Jacob Yang; United States	Xavion Johnson; Bahamas
–73 kg	Matheus Nolasco; Brazil	Alfredo Valdivieso; Ecuador	Tomás Hernández; Chile
–73 kg	Matheus Nolasco; Brazil	Alfredo Valdivieso; Ecuador	Rafael Ramírez; Mexico
–81 kg	Luan Almeida; Brazil	Arthur Karpukov; Canada	Alem Yuma; Argentina
–81 kg	Luan Almeida; Brazil	Arthur Karpukov; Canada	Luis Pariche; Venezuela
–90 kg	Jesse Barbosa; Brazil	Naysdel Cardoso; Cuba	Samuel Corzo; Venezuela
–90 kg	Jesse Barbosa; Brazil	Naysdel Cardoso; Cuba	Jhon Caicedo; Colombia
–100 kg	Gustavo Milano; Brazil	Daniel Liubimovski; United States	Marko Figueroa; Chile
–100 kg	Gustavo Milano; Brazil	Daniel Liubimovski; United States	Christopherd Galvis; Colombia
+100 kg	Andrey Coelho; Brazil	José Miguel Brache; Dominican Republic	John Bessong; Canada
+100 kg	Andrey Coelho; Brazil	José Miguel Brache; Dominican Republic	Kanta Ueyama; United States

==== Women ====
Event	Gold	Silver	Bronze
–48 kg	Clarice Ribeiro; Brazil	Manuela Crespo; Colombia	Laura Vasquez; Ecuador
–48 kg	Clarice Ribeiro; Brazil	Manuela Crespo; Colombia	Malia Manibog; United States
–52 kg	Rafaela Cavalcanti; Brazil	Aylin Ávila; Mexico	Driulys Rivas; Peru
–52 kg	Rafaela Cavalcanti; Brazil	Aylin Ávila; Mexico	Leomaris Ruiz; Venezuela
–57 kg	Bianca Reis; Brazil	Audreys Pacheco; Venezuela	Carla van Zyl; Canada
–57 kg	Bianca Reis; Brazil	Audreys Pacheco; Venezuela	Mayra Solis; Colombia
–63 kg	Eduarda Bastos; Brazil	Emily Jaspe; United States	María Cruz; Mexico
–63 kg	Eduarda Bastos; Brazil	Emily Jaspe; United States	Ivette Fuentes; Venezuela
–70 kg	Heydi Santillana; Colombia	Maria Eduarda Oliveira; Brazil	Charlie Thibault; Canada
–70 kg	Heydi Santillana; Colombia	Maria Eduarda Oliveira; Brazil	Hannelys Espina; Venezuela
–78 kg	Dandara Camillo; Brazil	Tania Murillo; Colombia	Mackenzie Schultz; United States
–78 kg	Dandara Camillo; Brazil	Tania Murillo; Colombia	Lisrialis Gonzalez; Cuba
+78 kg	Dayanara Travieso; Cuba	Kharla Casas; Chile	Rhadi Ferguson; United States
+78 kg	Dayanara Travieso; Cuba	Kharla Casas; Chile	Ana Gabrielle Soares; Brazil

==== Mixed ====
Event	Gold	Silver	Bronze
Team	Brazil; Lucas Takaki; Bruno Nóbrega; Matheus Nolasco; Luan Almeida; Jesse Barbosa; Gustavo Milano; Andrey Coelho; Clarice Ribeiro; Rafaela Rodrigues; Bianca Reis; Eduarda Bastos; Maria Eduarda Oliveira; Dandara Camillo; Ana Gabrielle Soares	Cuba; Dayanara Travieso; Jonathan Delgado; Yainet Coronado; Cristhian Cordero; Wendy Martínez; Adel Fresneda	United States; Daniel Schulgin; Rhadi Ferguson; Kanta Ueyama; Nicole Cancela; Jacob Yang; Emily Jaspe
Team	Brazil; Lucas Takaki; Bruno Nóbrega; Matheus Nolasco; Luan Almeida; Jesse Barbosa; Gustavo Milano; Andrey Coelho; Clarice Ribeiro; Rafaela Rodrigues; Bianca Reis; Eduarda Bastos; Maria Eduarda Oliveira; Dandara Camillo; Ana Gabrielle Soares	Cuba; Dayanara Travieso; Jonathan Delgado; Yainet Coronado; Cristhian Cordero; Wendy Martínez; Adel Fresneda	Colombia; Tania Murillo; Christopherd Galvis; Mayra Solis; Keiner Garnica; Heydi Santillana; Jhon Caicedo; Ingrid Choco

== Results ==
=== Men's events ===
==== 60 kg ====
Date: August 10

Round of 16
Lucas Takaki (BRA)	10
Israel Maldonado (PAR)	00

Quarter-finals
Christopher Velazco (USA)	10
Galo Villavicencio (ARG)	00
Jerónimo Pino (COL)	11
Angel Hernandez (GUA)	00
Jonathan Benavides (ECU)	10 (yellow card)
Lucas Takaki (BRA)	00
Eduardo Sagastegui (MEX)	01 (yellow card)
Yoel Hernandez (CUB)	00 (yellow card)

Semi-finals
Christopher Velazco (USA)	01 (yellow card)
Jerónimo Pino (COL)	00 (yellow card)
Jonathan Benavides (ECU)	10
Eduardo Sagastegui (MEX)	01

Gold medal contest
Christopher Velazco (USA)	00
Jonathan Benavides (ECU)	01

Repechage

Repechage
Galo Villavicencio (ARG)	10
Angel Hernandez (GUA)	00
Lucas Takaki (BRA)	01 (yellow card)
Yoel Hernandez (CUB)	00 (yellow card)

Bronze medal contests
Galo Villavicencio (ARG)	00
Eduardo Sagastegui (MEX)	01
Lucas Takaki (BRA)	10 (yellow card)
Jerónimo Pino (COL)	01

==== 66 kg ====
Date: August 10

Round of 16
Ian Aguirre (MEX)	10
Adel Fresneda (CUB)	00

Quarter-finals
Bruno Nobrega (BRA)	01
Jhordan Vanegas (COL)	00
Xavion Johnson (BAH)	10
Ian Aguirre (MEX)	00
Jacob Yang (USA)	10
Agustín Ledesma (PAR)	00
Fabricio Meyer (CHI)	10 (yellow card)
Mateo Condor (PER)	00

Semi-finals
Bruno Nobrega (BRA)	11
Xavion Johnson (BAH)	00
Jacob Yang (USA)	10
Fabricio Meyer (CHI)	00

Gold medal contest
Bruno Nobrega (BRA)	10
Jacob Yang (USA)	00

Repechage

Repechage
Jhordan Vanegas (COL)	01
Ian Aguirre (MEX)	00 (yellow card)
Agustín Ledesma (PAR)	00
Mateo Condor (PER)	11

Bronze medal contests
Jhordan Vanegas (COL)	10
Fabricio Meyer (CHI)	00
Mateo Condor (PER)	00
Xavion Johnson (BAH)	10 (yellow card)

==== 73 kg ====
Date: August 13

Round of 16
Cristhian Cordero (CUB)	01
Rafael Ramírez (MEX)	10

Quarter-finals
Alfredo Valdivieso (ECU)	01 (yellow card)
Keiner Sánchez (COL)	00
Anthony Farnot (USA)	10
Enzo Peralta (PAR)	00
Matheus Nolasco (BRA)	10 (yellow card)
Paolo Silva (URU)	00 (yellow card)
Tomás Hernández (CHI)	10
Rafael Ramírez (MEX)	00

Semi-finals
Alfredo Valdivieso (ECU)	10
Anthony Farnot (USA)	01
Matheus Nolasco (BRA)	01
Tomás Hernández (CHI)	00

Gold medal contest
Alfredo Valdivieso (ECU)	00
Matheus Nolasco (BRA)	10 (yellow card)

Repechage

Repechage
Keiner Sánchez (COL)	10 (yellow card)
Enzo Peralta (PAR)	00 (yellow card)
Paolo Silva (URU)	00
Rafael Ramírez (MEX)	01

Bronze medal contests
Keiner Sánchez (COL)	00
Tomás Hernández (CHI)	10
Rafael Ramírez (MEX)	01
Anthony Farnot (USA)	00 (yellow card)

==== 81 kg ====
Date: August 13

Quarter-finals
Luis Pariche (VEN)	00
Alem Yuma (ARG)	01
Francisco Galarza (PUR)	00
Arthur Karpukov (CAN)	10
Luan Almeida (BRA)	10
Elías Veron (PAR)	00
Daniel Shulgin (USA)	10
Benjamín Galarreta (PER)	00

Semi-finals
Alem Yuma (ARG)	00
Arthur Karpukov (CAN)	01 (yellow card)
Luan Almeida (BRA)	10
Daniel Shulgin (USA)	00

Final
Arthur Karpukov (CAN)	00 (yellow card)
Luan Almeida (BRA)	01

Repechage

Repechage
Luis Pariche (VEN)	10
Francisco Galarza (PUR)	00
Elías Veron (PAR)	00
Benjamín Galarreta (PER)	10 (yellow card)

Bronze medal contests
Luis Periche (VEN)	10
Daniel Shulgin (USA)	00
Benjamín Galarreta (PER)	00
Alem Yuma (ARG)	10 (yellow card)

==== 90 kg ====
Date: August 10

Quarter-finals
Jesse Barbosa (BRA)	10
Edgar Benitez (PAR)	00 (yellow card)
Jhon Caicedo (COL)	01
Tomás Quinteros (ARG)	10
Derik Rodríguez (PUR)	10
Emilio Loo (PER)	00
Samuel Corzo (VEN)	00
Naysdel Cardoso (CUB)	10

Semi-finals
Jesse Barbosa (BRA)	10
Tomás Quinteros (ARG)	00
Derik Rodríguez (PUR)	00
Naysdel Cardoso (CUB)	01

Final
Jesse Barbosa (BRA)	10 (yellow card)
Naysdel Cardoso (CUB)	00 (yellow card)

Repechage

Repechage
Edgar Benitez (PAR)	00
Jhon Caicedo (COL)	10
Emilio Loo (PER)	00
Samuel Corzo (VEN)	10

Bronze medal contests
Jhon Caicedo (COL)	10
Derik Rodríguez (PUR)	00
Samuel Corzo (VEN)	10
Tomás Quinteros (ARG)	00 (yellow card)

==== 100 kg ====
Date: August 13

Quarter-finals
Christopherd Galvis (COL)	00
Marko Figueroa (CHI)	10 (yellow card)
Gustavo Milano (BRA)	10
Gustavo Cañizalez (VEN)	00

Semi-finals
Daniel Liubimovski (USA)	10 (yellow card)
Marko Figueroa (CHI)	00 (yellow card)
Zail Ramírez (CUB)	DNS
Gustavo Milano (BRA)	W

Final
Daniel Liubimovski (USA)	00 (yellow card)
Gustavo Milano (BRA)	01

Repechage

Repechage
Christopherd Galvis (COL)	Bye
Gustavo Cañizalez (VEN)	Bye

Bronze medal contests
Christopherd Galvis (COL)
Zail Ramírez (CUB)	00
Gustavo Cañizalez (VEN)	00
Marko Figueroa (CHI)	10

==== +100 kg ====
Date: August 13

Quarter-finals
Andrey Coelho (BRA)	11
Valentino Valdivia (PER)	00 (yellow card)
Patricio Urra (CHI)	00
Hugo Sánchez (MEX)	10
José Miguel Brache (DOM)	10 (yellow card)
Jonathan Delgado (CUB)	00
John Bessong (CAN)	10 (yellow card)
Kanta Ueyama (USA)	00

Semi-finals
Andrey Coelho (BRA)	10
Hugo Sánchez (MEX)	00
José Miguel Brache (DOM)	10 (yellow card)
John Bessong (CAN)	00

Final
Andrey Coelho (BRA)	10
José Miguel Brache (DOM)	00

Repechage

Repechage
Valentino Valdivia (PER)	00
Patricio Urra (CHI)	01 (yellow card)
Jonathan Delgado (CUB)	00
Kanta Ueyama (USA)	11

Bronze medal contests
Patricio Urra (CHI)	00
John Bessong (CAN)	10 (yellow card)
Kanta Ueyama (USA)	10
Hugo Sánchez (MEX)	00

=== Women's events ===
==== 48 kg ====
Date: August 10

Round of 16
Addyson Tamura (CAN)	W
Gabriela Marecos (PAR)	DNS

Quarter-finals
Clarice Ribeiro (BRA)	10
Addyson Tamura (CAN)	00
Yainet Coronado (CUB)	00 (yellow card)
Malia Manibog (USA)	01
Laura Vasquez (ECU)	10
Yarelis Lucas (DOM)	00 (yellow card)
Manuela Crespo (COL)	10 (yellow card)
Noelia Paz (BOL)	00

Semi-finals
Clarice Ribeiro (BRA)	10
Malia Manibog (USA)	00
Laura Vasquez (ECU)	00
Manuela Crespo (COL)	10

Gold medal contest
Clarice Ribeiro (BRA)	01 (yellow card)
Manuela Crespo (COL)	00

Repechage

Repechage
Addyson Tamura (CAN)	00
Yainet Coronado (CUB)	11
Yarelis Lucas (DOM)	02
Noelia Paz (BOL)	00

Bronze medal contests
Yainet Coronado (CUB)	00
Laura Vasquez (ECU)	02
Yarelis Lucas (DOM)	00
Malia Manibog (USA)	10

==== 52 kg ====
Date: August 10

Round of 16
Harlee Hiller (USA)	11
Julieta Escobar (PAN)	00

Quarter-finals
Rafaela Cavalcanti (BRA)	10
Wendy Golu (COL)	00
Leomaris Ruiz (VEN)	10
Valentina Álamo (ARG)	01
Aylin Ávila (MEX)	10
Nancy Gimenez (PAR)	00
Driulys Rivas (PER)	01 (yellow card)
Harlee Hiller (USA)	00

Semi-finals
Rafaela Cavalcanti (BRA)	10 (yellow card)
Leomaris Ruiz (VEN)	01
Aylin Ávila (MEX)	01
Driulys Rivas (PER)	00

Gold medal contest
Rafaela Cavalcanti (BRA)	10
Aylin Ávila (MEX)	00

Repechage

Repechage
Wendy Golu (COL)	10 (yellow card)
Valentina Álamo (ARG)	00
Nancy Gimenez (PAR)	00
Harlee Hiller (USA)	10

Bronze medal contests
Wendy Golu (COL)	00
Driulys Rivas (PER)	01 (yellow card)
Harlee Hiller (USA)	00
Leomaris Ruiz (VEN)	01

==== 57 kg ====
Date: August 10

Round of 16
Luciana Julca (PER)	01
Maya Aubert (ESA)	00

Quarter-finals
Bianca Reis (BRA)	10 (yellow card)
Nicole Cancela (USA)	00
Frida Maya (MEX)	00
Mayra Solis (COL)	01 (yellow card)
Carla van Zyl (CAN)	10
Luciana Julca (PER)	00
Audreys Pacheco (VEN)	W
Jimena Arce (CRC)	L

Semi-finals
Bianca Reis (BRA)	10
Mayra Solis (COL)	00
Carla van Zyl (CAN)	00
Audreys Pacheco (VEN)	01

Gold medal contest
Bianca Reis (BRA)	10
Audreys Pacheco (VEN)	00

Repechage

Repechage
Nicole Cancela (USA)	00
Frida Maya (MEX)	10
Luciana Julca (PER)	01 (yellow card)
Jimena Arce (CRC)	00 (yellow card)

Bronze medal contests
Frida Maya (MEX)	00
Carla van Zyl (CAN)	10
Luciana Julca (PER)	00 (yellow card)
Mayra Solis (COL)	02

==== 63 kg ====
Date: August 10

Quarter-finals
Eduarda Bastos (BRA)	10
Noilyn Aguilar (CRC)	00
Ivette Fuentes (VEN)	10 (yellow card)
María Cruz (MEX)	01
Emily Jaspe (USA)	01 (yellow card)
Constanza Pérez (CHI)	00
Ingrid Choco (COL)	00
Wendy Martínez (CUB)	01 (yellow card)

Semi-finals
Eduarda Bastos (BRA)	01
Ivette Fuentes (VEN)	00
Emily Jaspe (USA)	01 (yellow card)
Wendy Martínez (CUB)	00 (yellow card)

Final
Eduarda Bastos (BRA)	01
Emily Jaspe (USA)	00 (yellow card)

Repechage

Repechage
Noilyn Aguilar (CRC)	00
María Cruz (MEX)	01
Constanza Pérez (CHI)	00
Ingrid Choco (COL)	01

Bronze medal contests
María Cruz (MEX)	10
Wendy Martínez (CUB)	00
Ingrid Choco (COL)	00 (yellow card)
Ivette Fuentes (VEN)	01

==== 70 kg ====
Date: August 13

Quarter-finals
Heydi Santillana (COL)	10
Yamileth Juárez (MEX)	00
Charlie Thibault (CAN)	00
Hannelys Espina (VEN)	10
Maria Eduarda Oliveira (BRA)	10 (yellow card)
Victoria Ramírez (DOM)	00
Shavon González (USA)	10
Valeria Duarte (PAR)	00

Semi-finals
Heydi Santillana (COL)	01
Hannelys Espina (VEN)	00
Maria Eduarda Oliveira (BRA)	01
Shavon González (USA)	00

Final
Heydi Santillana (COL)	02 (yellow card)
Maria Eduarda Oliveira (BRA)	00 (yellow card)

Repechage

Repechage
Yamileth Juárez (MEX)	00
Charlie Thibault (CAN)	10
Victoria Ramírez (DOM)	10
Valeria Duarte (PAR)	00

Bronze medal contests
Charlie Thibault (CAN)	10 (yellow card)
Shavon González (USA)	00
Victoria Ramírez (DOM)	00
Hannelys Espina (VEN)	10

==== 78 kg ====
Date: August 13

Quarter-finals
Dandara Camillo (BRA)	10
María Pesantez (ECU)	00
Lisrialis González (CUB)	10
Nahyr Angelacio (PAR)	00
Tania Murillo (COL)	10
Paula Sánchez (MEX)	00
Yhoseli Matos (DOM)	00
Mackenzie Schultz (USA)	10

Semi-finals
Dandara Camillo (BRA)	10
Lisrialis González (CUB)	00
Tania Murillo (COL)	10
Mackenzie Schultz (USA)	00

Final
Dandara Camillo (BRA)	10
Tania Murillo (COL)	00

Repechage

Repechage
María Pesantez (ECU)	10
Nahyr Angelacio (PAR)	00
Paula Sánchez (MEX)	00
Yhoseli Matos (DOM)	10 (yellow card)

Bronze medal contests
María Pesantez (ECU)	00
Mackenzie Schultz (USA)	11
Yhoseli Matos (DOM)	00
Lisrialis González (CUB)	11

==== +78 kg ====
Date: August 12

Quarter-finals
Dayanara Curbelo (CUB)	W
Arianna Chaves (CRC)	DNS
Alisa Kofman (CAN)	10
Rhadi Ferguson (USA)	00
Kharla Casas (CHI)	W
Bárbara Padilla (MEX)	DNS
Ana Gabrielle Soares (BRA)	00
Marielin Gómez (DOM)	10

Semi-finals
Dayanara Curbelo (CUB)	10
Alisa Kofman (CAN)	00
Kharla Casas (CHI)	10 (yellow card)
Marielin Gómez (DOM)	00

Final
Dayanara Curbelo (CUB)	10 (yellow card)
Kharla Casas (CHI)	00

Repechage

Repechage
Arianna Chaves (CRC)	DNS
Rhadi Ferguson (USA)	W
Bárbara Padilla (MEX)	DNS
Ana Gabrielle Soares (BRA)	W

Bronze medal contests
Rhadi Ferguson (USA)	01 (yellow card)
Marielin Gómez (DOM)	00
Ana Gabrielle Soares (BRA)	10
Alisa Kofman (CAN)	00

=== Mixed event ===
==== Team ====
Date: August 13

Round of 16
United States	4
Mexico	0

Quarter-finals
Brazil	4
United States	0
Chile	3
Colombia	4
Canada	L
Peru	L
Cuba	4
Paraguay	0

Semi-finals
Brazil	4
Colombia	1
Canada	3
Cuba	4

Gold medal contest
Brazil	4
Cuba	0

Repechage

Repechage
United States	4
Chile	0
Peru	4
Paraguay	1

Bronze medal contests
United States	4
Canada	2
Peru	3
Colombia	4
