= Mexico at the 2025 Junior Pan American Games =

- IOC code: MEX
- NOC: Mexican Olympic Committee
- Website: www.soycom.org (in Spanish)

in Asunción, Paraguay 9 August 2025 – 23 August 2025
- Competitors: 377 (187 men and 190 women)
- Flag bearers: Ángela Ruiz & Etan Nuño
- Medals Ranked 4th: Gold 29 Silver 45 Bronze 55 Total 129

Junior Pan American Games appearances (overview)
- 2021; 2025

Mexico competed at the 2nd 2025 Junior Pan American Games in Asunción, Paraguay from 9 to 23 August, 2025. It was the nation's second appearance at the Junior Pan American Games, having debuted in 2021. Overall, Mexico obtained 129 medals and 16 direct spots to the 2027 Pan American Games in Lima, Peru.

== Medalists ==
| Medal | Name | Sport | Event | Date |
|---|---|---|---|---|
| 1st place, gold medalist(s) | Iván Aguilar | Cycling | Men's Cross-Country | 10 August |
| 1st place, gold medalist(s) | Humberto Nájera | Swimming | Men's 200m Backstroke | 11 August |
| 1st place, gold medalist(s) | Martha Coldwell; Ana Carolina Martínez; Jaydi Novelo; Bárbara Ponce; Fernanda Ramírez | Gymnastics | Group All-Around | 12 August |
| 1st place, gold medalist(s) | Celia Pulido | Swimming | Women's 100m Backstroke | 12 August |
| 1st place, gold medalist(s) | Adriana Castillo; Máximo Méndez | Archery | Mixed Team Compound | 12 August |
| 1st place, gold medalist(s) | Naomi Aguilar; Ángela Ruiz | Archery | Women's Team Recurve | 12 August |
| 1st place, gold medalist(s) | Ana Luisa Abraham | Gymnastics | Individual Ball | 13 August |
| 1st place, gold medalist(s) | Martha Coldwell; Ana Carolina Martínez; Jaydi Novelo; Bárbara Ponce; Fernanda Ramírez | Gymnastics | Group 5 Pairs of Clubs | 13 August |
| 1st place, gold medalist(s) | Wally Ávila; Mariana Narvaez | Squash | Mixed Doubles | 14 August |
| 1st place, gold medalist(s) | Andrea Zambrano | Taekwondo | Women's −49 kg | 15 August |
| 1st place, gold medalist(s) | Zaira Salgado | Taekwondo | Women's −57 kg | 15 August |
| 1st place, gold medalist(s) | Lía Cueva; Mía Cueva | Diving | Women's 3m Synchronized Springboard | 16 August |
| 1st place, gold medalist(s) | Ana Botello; Paola Franco; Mariana Narvaez | Squash | Women's Team | 16 August |
| 1st place, gold medalist(s) | Paulo Strehlke | Open Water Swimming | Men's 10km | 17 August |
| 1st place, gold medalist(s) | José Antonio Prieto | Cycling | Men's Road Race | 17 August |
| 1st place, gold medalist(s) | Jesús Agundez; David Vázquez | Diving | Men's 3m Synchronized Springboard | 17 August |
| 1st place, gold medalist(s) | Karla Serrano | Athletics | Women's 20km Race Walk | 18 August |
| 1st place, gold medalist(s) | Kenny Zamudio | Diving | Men's 10m Platform | 18 August |
| 1st place, gold medalist(s) | David Vázquez | Diving | Men's 3m Springboard | 19 August |
| 1st place, gold medalist(s) | Dafne Juárez | Athletics | Women's 1,500m | 20 August |
| 1st place, gold medalist(s) | Antonia Sánchez | Athletics | Women's 400m Hurdles | 20 August |
| 1st place, gold medalist(s) | Diego Monsalve | Water Skiing | Men's Wakeboard | 21 August |
| 1st place, gold medalist(s) | Dafne Juárez | Athletics | Women's 5,000m | 21 August |
| 1st place, gold medalist(s) | Lorenzo Zaragoza | Gymnastics | Men's Rings | 21 August |
| 1st place, gold medalist(s) | Ana Herrera | Karate | Women's -61kg | 22 August |
| 1st place, gold medalist(s) | Camila Argumedo; Daniela Ávila | Artistic Swimming | Duet | 22 August |
| 1st place, gold medalist(s) | Nayeli Mondragón; Diego Villalobos | Artistic Swimming | Mixed Duet | 22 August |
| 1st place, gold medalist(s) | Naomi Campos; Ana Hernández | Canoeing | Women's K2 500m | 23 August |
| 1st place, gold medalist(s) | Camila Argumedo; Carolina Arzate; Daniela Ávila; Fernanda Carmona; Victoria Delgado; Jacqueline Meléndez; Nayeli Mondragón; Citlali Nuño; Diego Villalobos | Artistic Swimming | Mixed Team | 23 August |
| 2nd place, silver medalist(s) | José Antonio Prieto | Cycling | Men's Time Trial | 10 August |
| 2nd place, silver medalist(s) | Ana Margarita Paredes | Fencing | Women's Epeé | 10 August |
| 2nd place, silver medalist(s) | Aylín Ávila | Judo | Women's −52 kg | 10 August |
| 2nd place, silver medalist(s) | Fernanda Elizondo; María Méndez; Celia Pulido; Valeria Villarreal | Swimming | Women's 4x100m Freestyle Relay | 10 August |
| 2nd place, silver medalist(s) | Sofía Ibarra | Shooting | Women's 10m Air Pistol | 10 August |
| 2nd place, silver medalist(s) | Celia Pulido | Swimming | Women's 200m Backstroke | 11 August |
| 2nd place, silver medalist(s) | Jafet López; Etan Nuño; Ian Navarro | Cycling | Men's Team Sprint | 12 August |
| 2nd place, silver medalist(s) | Donovan Guevara | Gymnastics | Men's Individual Trampoline | 12 August |
| 2nd place, silver medalist(s) | Andrés Dupont | Swimming | Men's 100m Freestyle | 12 August |
| 2nd place, silver medalist(s) | Sofía Ibarra; Erick Ruiz | Shooting | Mixed 10m Air Pistol | 12 August |
| 2nd place, silver medalist(s) | Hanna Cisneros; Josué Rodríguez | Shooting | Mixed 10m Air Rifle | 12 August |
| 2nd place, silver medalist(s) | Máximo Méndez | Archery | Men's Individual Compound | 12 August |
| 2nd place, silver medalist(s) | Adriana Castillo | Archery | Women's Individual Compound | 12 August |
| 2nd place, silver medalist(s) | Martha Coldwell; Ana Carolina Martínez; Jaydi Novelo; Bárbara Ponce; Fernanda Ramírez | Gymnastics | Group 5 Hoops | 13 August |
| 2nd place, silver medalist(s) | José Alberto Cano; Andrés Dupont; David Medina; Paulo Strehlke | Swimming | Men's 4x200m Freestyle Relay | 13 August |
| 2nd place, silver medalist(s) | Ana Karen Botello; Paola Franco | Squash | Women's Doubles | 14 August |
| 2nd place, silver medalist(s) | Marcelo Garza; Fernando Nava | Cycling | Men's Madison | 15 August |
| 2nd place, silver medalist(s) | Marianne Ángel; Hanne Estrada | Tennis | Women's Doubles | 15 August |
| 2nd place, silver medalist(s) | Team Mexico | Volleyball | Women's Tournament | 15 August |
| 2nd place, silver medalist(s) | David Vázquez | Diving | Men's 1m Springboard | 16 August |
| 2nd place, silver medalist(s) | Paloma García | Taekwondo | Women's +67 kg | 16 August |
| 2nd place, silver medalist(s) | Obed Martínez | Taekwondo | Men's Individual Traditional Poomsae | 17 August |
| 2nd place, silver medalist(s) | Brisa Alekc | Taekwondo | Women's Individual Traditional Poomsae | 17 August |
| 2nd place, silver medalist(s) | Regina Espinosa; Anisa Jeffries; Loriette Maciel; Laura Plascencia | 3x3 Basketball | Women's Tournament | 17 August |
| 2nd place, silver medalist(s) | Alec Vázquez | Sailing | Men's Kite | 17 August |
| 2nd place, silver medalist(s) | Valeria Flores | Athletics | Women's 20km Race Walk | 18 August |
| 2nd place, silver medalist(s) | Mía Cueva | Diving | Women's 1m Springboard | 18 August |
| 2nd place, silver medalist(s) | Mariel Salazar | Athletics | Women's 10,000m | 18 August |
| 2nd place, silver medalist(s) | Iker Sánchez | Athletics | Men's 5,000m | 18 August |
| 2nd place, silver medalist(s) | Suri Cueva; María Sánchez | Diving | Women's 10m Synchronized Springboard | 19 August |
| 2nd place, silver medalist(s) | Jesús Agundez | Diving | Men's 3m Springboard | 19 August |
| 2nd place, silver medalist(s) | Mía Cueva | Diving | Women's 3m Springboard | 19 August |
| 2nd place, silver medalist(s) | Emilio Treviño; Kenny Zamudio | Diving | Men's 10m Synchronized Platform | 19 August |
| 2nd place, silver medalist(s) | Leonardo Torres | Weightlifting | Men's 71kg | 20 August |
| 2nd place, silver medalist(s) | Ángel Segura | Wrestling | Men's Greco-Roman −60kg | 20 August |
| 2nd place, silver medalist(s) | Sabrina Salcedo | Athletics | Women's 1,500m | 20 August |
| 2nd place, silver medalist(s) | Diego Macías | Wrestling | Men's Greco-Roman −87kg | 20 August |
| 2nd place, silver medalist(s) | María José Hernández | Weightlifting | Women's 58kg | 20 August |
| 2nd place, silver medalist(s) | Dorian Trejo | Wrestling | Men's Greco-Roman −97kg | 20 August |
| 2nd place, silver medalist(s) | Nicol Guzmán | Canoeing | Women's C1 500m | 21 August |
| 2nd place, silver medalist(s) | Fernanda Larios | Water Skiing | Women's Wakeboard | 21 August |
| 2nd place, silver medalist(s) | Bertha Rojas | Wrestling | Women's Freestyle −57kg | 21 August |
| 2nd place, silver medalist(s) | Paola del Real | Athletics | Women's Triple Jump | 21 August |
| 2nd place, silver medalist(s) | Naomi Campos; Ana Hernández; Daniela Salazar; Ana Ureña | Canoeing | Women's K4 500m | 22 August |
| 2nd place, silver medalist(s) | Mairyn Hernández | Weightlifting | Women's +77kg | 23 August |
| 3rd place, bronze medalist(s) | Eduardo Sagastegui | Judo | Men's −60 kg | 10 August |
| 3rd place, bronze medalist(s) | Roberto Ahumada; José Navarro | Rowing | Men's M2X | 10 August |
| 3rd place, bronze medalist(s) | María Cruz | Judo | Women's −63 kg | 11 August |
| 3rd place, bronze medalist(s) | María Méndez | Swimming | Women's 100m Butterfly | 11 August |
| 3rd place, bronze medalist(s) | Rafael Ramírez | Judo | Men's −73 kg | 11 August |
| 3rd place, bronze medalist(s) | Diego Camacho; José Alberto Cano; Andrés Dupont; Andrea González; David Medina; María Méndez; Celia Pulido; Alfredo Velázquez; Valeria Villarreal | Swimming | Mixed 4x100m Freestyle Relay | 11 August |
| 3rd place, bronze medalist(s) | Vanesa García | Badminton | Women's Singles | 12 August |
| 3rd place, bronze medalist(s) | Marcelo Garza; Fernando Nava; Kevin Ortega; Arath Sánchez | Cycling | Men's Team Pursuit | 12 August |
| 3rd place, bronze medalist(s) | Viviana Arriaga; Nicole Córdova; Giovana López; María Figueroa | Cycling | Women's Team Pursuit | 12 August |
| 3rd place, bronze medalist(s) | Verónica Borges; Aixa de León | Gymnastics | Women's Synchronized Trampoline | 12 August |
| 3rd place, bronze medalist(s) | Sharon Guerrero | Swimming | Women's 800m Freestyle | 12 August |
| 3rd place, bronze medalist(s) | Paulo Strehlke | Swimming | Men's 800m Freestyle | 12 August |
| 3rd place, bronze medalist(s) | Mariana Narvaez | Squash | Women's Singles | 12 August |
| 3rd place, bronze medalist(s) | Marijose Delgado | Gymnastics | Individual Hoop | 13 August |
| 3rd place, bronze medalist(s) | Maximiliano Vega | Swimming | Men's 400m Individual Medley | 13 August |
| 3rd place, bronze medalist(s) | Isabella Chávez | Swimming | Women's 200m Individual Medley | 14 August |
| 3rd place, bronze medalist(s) | Santiago Gutiérrez | Swimming | Men's 1500m Freestyle | 14 August |
| 3rd place, bronze medalist(s) | Fernanda Elizondo; María Méndez; Mariana Ortega; Celia Pulido | Swimming | Women's 4x100m Medley Relay | 14 August |
| 3rd place, bronze medalist(s) | Rafael Arizpe; Diego Camacho; Andrés Dupont; Humberto Nájera; Marco Pat; Nicolás Sobenes; Alfredo Velázquez | Swimming | Men's 4x100m Medley Relay | 14 August |
| 3rd place, bronze medalist(s) | Gilberto Aceves; Santiago Medina | Squash | Men's Doubles | 14 August |
| 3rd place, bronze medalist(s) | Carlos Cortés | Taekwondo | Men's −58 kg | 15 August |
| 3rd place, bronze medalist(s) | Gilberto Aceves; Wally Ávila; Santiago Medina | Squash | Men's Team | 16 August |
| 3rd place, bronze medalist(s) | Víctor Ramírez | Taekwondo | Men's +80 kg | 16 August |
| 3rd place, bronze medalist(s) | Brisa Alekc; Obed Martínez | Taekwondo | Mixed Poomsae Freestyle Pairs | 17 August |
| 3rd place, bronze medalist(s) | Paulina Alanís | Open Water Swimming | Women's 10km | 17 August |
| 3rd place, bronze medalist(s) | Carlos Cortés; Paloma García; Leonardo Gómez; Julia Ramírez; Víctor Ramírez; Zaira Salgado | Taekwondo | Mixed Team | 17 August |
| 3rd place, bronze medalist(s) | Lía Cueva | Diving | Women's 1m Springboard | 18 August |
| 3rd place, bronze medalist(s) | Luz Rocha | Athletics | Women's 10,000m | 18 August |
| 3rd place, bronze medalist(s) | Ian Sánchez | Athletics | Men's 5,000m | 18 August |
| 3rd place, bronze medalist(s) | Brandon Pérez | Athletics | Men's 20km Race Walk | 19 August |
| 3rd place, bronze medalist(s) | Lía Cueva | Diving | Women's 3m Springboard | 19 August |
| 3rd place, bronze medalist(s) | Áaron Ibarra; Juan Pablo Dueñas; Gael Rosales; Lorenzo Zaragoza | Gymnastics | Men's Team | 19 August |
| 3rd place, bronze medalist(s) | José Gil | Canoeing | Men's C1 1000m | 20 August |
| 3rd place, bronze medalist(s) | Jaime Palomino | Water Skiing | Men's Slalom | 20 August |
| 3rd place, bronze medalist(s) | Pablo Font | Water Skiing | Men's Figures | 20 August |
| 3rd place, bronze medalist(s) | Ana Muñoz | Karate | Women's -68kg | 21 August |
| 3rd place, bronze medalist(s) | Ana Sofía Palacios | Wrestling | Women's Freestyle −50kg | 21 August |
| 3rd place, bronze medalist(s) | David Vázquez | Athletics | Men's High Jump | 21 August |
| 3rd place, bronze medalist(s) | Dominica Escartín | Gymnastics | Women's Uneven Bars | 21 August |
| 3rd place, bronze medalist(s) | Sabrina Salcedo | Athletics | Women's 5,000m | 21 August |
| 3rd place, bronze medalist(s) | Debanhi Tapia | Wrestling | Women's Freestyle −68kg | 21 August |
| 3rd place, bronze medalist(s) | Edna Jiménez | Wrestling | Women's Freestyle −76kg | 21 August |
| 3rd place, bronze medalist(s) | María López; Regina Michel; Alfredo Rodríguez; Osvaldo Zúñiga | Triathlon | Mixed Relay | 22 August |
| 3rd place, bronze medalist(s) | Hayato Yoshii | Karate | Men's -75kg | 22 August |
| 3rd place, bronze medalist(s) | Camila Cervantes | Weightlifting | Women's 77kg | 22 August |
| 3rd place, bronze medalist(s) | Amado Amador | Athletics | Men's 800m | 22 August |
| 3rd place, bronze medalist(s) | Sofía Peña | Athletics | Women's 3,000m Steeplechase | 22 August |
| 3rd place, bronze medalist(s) | Áaron Ibarra | Gymnastics | Men's Parallel Bars | 22 August |
| 3rd place, bronze medalist(s) | Roberto Márquez | Athletics | Men's 3,000m Steeplechase | 22 August |
| 3rd place, bronze medalist(s) | Diego Peraza | Wrestling | Men's Freestyle −65kg | 22 August |
| 3rd place, bronze medalist(s) | Paola Bueno | Athletics | Women's Hammer Throw | 22 August |
| 3rd place, bronze medalist(s) | Juan Iturriza | Wrestling | Men's Freestyle −97kg | 22 August |
| 3rd place, bronze medalist(s) | Shakti Álvarez; Jazmín López; Kenya Maturana; Antonia Sánchez | Athletics | Women's 4x400m Relay | 22 August |
| 3rd place, bronze medalist(s) | Dominica Escartín | Gymnastics | Women's Floor | 22 August |
| 3rd place, bronze medalist(s) | José Gil; Nicol Guzmán | Canoeing | Mixed C2 500m | 23 August |

Medals by Sport
| Sport | 1st place, gold medalist(s) | 2nd place, silver medalist(s) | 3rd place, bronze medalist(s) | Total |
| Diving | 4 | 6 | 2 | 12 |
| Athletics | 4 | 5 | 10 | 19 |
| Gymnastics | 4 | 2 | 6 | 12 |
| Swimming | 3 | 4 | 10 | 17 |
| Artistic Swimming | 3 | 0 | 0 | 3 |
| Taekwondo | 2 | 3 | 4 | 9 |
| Cycling | 2 | 3 | 2 | 7 |
| Archery | 2 | 2 | 0 | 4 |
| Squash | 2 | 1 | 3 | 6 |
| Canoeing | 1 | 2 | 2 | 5 |
| Water Skiing | 1 | 1 | 2 | 4 |
| Karate | 1 | 0 | 2 | 3 |
| Wrestling | 0 | 4 | 5 | 9 |
| Weightlifting | 0 | 3 | 1 | 4 |
| Shooting | 0 | 3 | 0 | 3 |
| Judo | 0 | 1 | 3 | 4 |
| 3x3 Basketball | 0 | 1 | 0 | 1 |
| Fencing | 0 | 1 | 0 | 1 |
| Sailing | 0 | 1 | 0 | 1 |
| Tennis | 0 | 1 | 0 | 1 |
| Volleyball | 0 | 1 | 0 | 1 |
| Badminton | 0 | 0 | 1 | 1 |
| Rowing | 0 | 0 | 1 | 1 |
| Triathlon | 0 | 0 | 1 | 1 |
| Total | 29 | 45 | 55 | 129 |

== Competitors ==
The following is the list of number of competitors (by gender) who participated at the games per sport.

| Sport | Men | Women | Total |
|---|---|---|---|
| 3x3 Basketball | 4 | 4 | 8 |
| Archery | 3 | 3 | 6 |
| Artistic Skating | 1 | 2 | 3 |
| Artistic Swimming | 1 | 8 | 9 |
| Athletics | 24 | 19 | 43 |
| Badminton | 2 | 2 | 4 |
| Canoeing | 6 | 6 | 12 |
| Cycling | 13 | 15 | 28 |
| Diving | 4 | 4 | 8 |
| Fencing | 3 | 3 | 6 |
| Field Hockey | 16 | 16 | 32 |
| Golf | 2 | 2 | 4 |
| Gymnastics | 6 | 13 | 19 |
| Handball | 14 | 14 | 28 |
| Judo | 4 | 6 | 10 |
| Karate | 4 | 3 | 7 |
| Rowing | 5 | 1 | 6 |
| Rugby Sevens | 12 | 12 | 24 |
| Sailing | 2 | 1 | 3 |
| Shooting | 4 | 6 | 10 |
| Skateboarding | 2 | 2 | 4 |
| Speed Skating | 2 | 2 | 4 |
| Squash | 3 | 3 | 6 |
| Swimming | 13 | 13 | 26 |
| Table Tennis | 2 | 2 | 4 |
| Taekwondo | 4 | 5 | 9 |
| Tennis | 3 | 3 | 6 |
| Triathlon | 2 | 2 | 4 |
| Volleyball | 12 | 12 | 24 |
| Water Skiing | 3 | 1 | 4 |
| Weightlifting | 3 | 3 | 6 |
| Wrestling | 7 | 5 | 12 |
| Total | 186 | 193 | 379 |

All cycling and gymnastics disciplines are grouped within each of the sports' totals. Roller sports are separated by discipline and open water swimming is included in swimming. Some athletes were counted twice by the 2025 Junior Pan American Games Organization but the total number of athletes differs from the total number reported by the Mexican Olympic Committee by 2, for unknown reasons.

== Archery ==
Men

| Athlete | Event | Ranking round | | Round of 32 | Round of 16 | Quarterfinals | Semifinals | Final / BM | |
| Athlete | Event | Score | Seed | Opposition Score | Opposition Score | Opposition Score | Opposition Score | Opposition Score | Rank |
|---|---|---|---|---|---|---|---|---|---|
| Francisco Márquez | Men's Individual Recurve | 623 | 11 | Chung (GUY); W 7–1 | Allen (GUA); W 6–0 | García (GUA); L 2-6 | Did not advance | | 6 |
| Hugo Cueto | Men's Individual Recurve | 622 | 12 | Mighty (JAM); W 6-0 | da Silva (BRA); L 4-6 | Did not advance | | | =9 |
| Máximo Méndez | Men's Individual Compound | 686 | 3 | —N/a | Orihuela (PER); W 144-127 | Camacho (VEN); W 145-144 | Neilson (USA); W 143-142 | Magalhaes (BRA); L 142-144 | 2nd place, silver medalist(s) |
| Francisco Márquez; Hugo Cueto | Men's Team Recurve | 1245 | 3 | —N/a | | | Guatemala; L 4-5 | Colombia; L 0-6 | 4 |

Women

| Athlete | Event | Ranking round | | Round of 32 | Round of 16 | Quarterfinals | Semifinals | Final / BM | |
| Athlete | Event | Score | Seed | Opposition Score | Opposition Score | Opposition Score | Opposition Score | Opposition Score | Rank |
|---|---|---|---|---|---|---|---|---|---|
| Ángela Ruiz | Women's Individual Recurve | 662 | 1 | Bye | Nakatani (PAR); L 2-6 | Did not advance | | | =9 |
| Naomi Aguilar | Women's Individual Recurve | 572 | 12 | Fernández (BOL); W 6-4 | Arias (COL); L 1-7 | Did not advance | | | =9 |
| Adriana Castillo | Women's Individual Compound | 689 | 3 | —N/a | —N/a | de la Cruz (ARG); W 147-139 | Sepúlveda (COL); W 145-142 | Rodrigo (ECU); L 141-146 | 2nd place, silver medalist(s) |
| Ángela Ruiz; Naomi Aguilar | Women's Team Recurve | 1234 | 2 | —N/a | | | Canada; W 5-1 | Brazil; W 5-4 | 1st place, gold medalist(s) |

Mixed

| Athlete | Event | Ranking round | | Round of 16 | Quarterfinals | Semifinals | Final / BM | |
| Athlete | Event | Score | Seed | Opposition Score | Opposition Score | Opposition Score | Opposition Score | Rank |
|---|---|---|---|---|---|---|---|---|
| Ángela Ruiz; Naomi Aguilar; Francisco Márquez; Hugo Cueto | Mixed Team Recurve | 1285 | 1 | Dominican Republic; W 6-0 | Cuba; L 2-6 | Did not advance | | 7 |
| Máximo Méndez; Adriana Castillo | Mixed Team Compound | 1375 | 1 | —N/a | Brazil; W 155-148 | Costa Rica; W 158-151 | United States; W 153-140 | 1st place, gold medalist(s) |

== Artistic Swimming ==
| Athlete | Event | Technical routine | | Free routine | | Acrobatic routine | | Total Points | Final Rank |
| Athlete | Event | Points | Rank | Points | Rank | Points | Rank | Total Points | Final Rank |
|---|---|---|---|---|---|---|---|---|---|
| Camila Argumedo; Daniela Ávila | Duet | 264.2933 | 1 | 240.3692 | 1 | —N/a | | 504.6625 | 1st place, gold medalist(s) |
| Nayeli Mondragón; Diego Villalobos | Mixed Duet | 217.3984 | 1 | 313.1167 | 1 | —N/a | | 530.5151 | 1st place, gold medalist(s) |
| Camila Argumedo; Carolina Arzate; Daniela Ávila; Fernanda Carmona; Victoria Delgado; Jacqueline Meléndez; Nayeli Mondragón; Citlali Nuño; Diego Villalobos | Mixed Team | 251.9950 | 1 | 275.3050 | 1 | 194.9850 | 1 | 722.2850 | 1st place, gold medalist(s) |

== Athletics ==
Key

- Ranks given for track events are overall after all heats are completed
- Q = Qualified for the next round by position
- q = Qualified for the next round by time
- DNF = Did not finish
- JPR = Junior Pan American Record

=== Track & Road ===
Men

| Athlete | Event | Semifinal | | Final | |
| Athlete | Event | Result | Rank | Result | Rank |
|---|---|---|---|---|---|
| Rafael Buelna | 400m | 49.02 | 11 | Did not advance | 11 |
| Amado Amador | 800m | 1:51.18 | 7 Q | 1:49.14 | 3rd place, bronze medalist(s) |
| José Manuel Rodríguez | 800m | 1:53.27 | 11 | Did not advance | 11 |
| Ricardo Amador | 1,500m | —N/a | | 3:49.55 | 5 |
| Iker Sánchez | 1,500m | —N/a | | 3:46.36 | 4 |
| Ian Sánchez | 5,000m | —N/a | | 14:14.42 | 3rd place, bronze medalist(s) |
| Iker Sánchez | 5,000m | —N/a | | 14:13.14 | 2nd place, silver medalist(s) |
| Axel Arcega | 10,000m | —N/a | | DNF | |
| Miguel López | 10,000m | —N/a | | 31:37.2 | 5 |
| Alejandro Hernández | 3,000m Steeplechase | —N/a | | 9:25.26 | 9 |
| Roberto Márquez | 3,000m Steeplechase | —N/a | | 9:02.34 | 3rd place, bronze medalist(s) |
| Dicarlo Angulo | 110m Hurdles | 15.68 | 12 | Did not advance | 12 |
| José Aguado | 400m Hurdles | 51.14 | 9 | Did not advance | 9 |
| Maximiliano Núñez | 400m Hurdles | 51.24 | 10 | Did not advance | 10 |
| Emiliano Barba | 20km Race Walk | —N/a | | 1:31:08.18 | 9 |
| Brandon Pérez | 20km Race Walk | —N/a | | 1:24:48.51 | 3rd place, bronze medalist(s) |
| José Aguado; Maximiliano Núñez; Darío Rodríguez; Abimelec Zamorano | 4x400m Relay | —N/a | | 3:13.58 | 5 |

Women

| Athlete | Event | Final | |
| Athlete | Event | Result | Rank |
|---|---|---|---|
| Dafne Juárez | 1,500m | 4:23.58 | 1st place, gold medalist(s) |
| Sabrina Salcedo | 1,500m | 4:24.87 | 2nd place, silver medalist(s) |
| Dafne Juárez | 5,000m | 15:51.27 JPR | 1st place, gold medalist(s) |
| Sabrina Salcedo | 5,000m | 16:09.11 | 3rd place, bronze medalist(s) |
| Luz Rocha | 10,000m | 36:20.93 | 3rd place, bronze medalist(s) |
| Mariel Salazar | 10,000m | 36:04.08 | 2nd place, silver medalist(s) |
| Andrea Ávalos | 3,000m Steeplechase | 11:01.78 | 5 |
| Sofía Peña | 3,000m Steeplechase | 10:44.15 | 3rd place, bronze medalist(s) |
| Antonia Sánchez | 400m Hurdles | 55.91 JPR | 1st place, gold medalist(s) |
| Valeria Flores | 20km Race Walk | 1:33:21.4 | 2nd place, silver medalist(s) |
| Karla Serrano | 20km Race Walk | 1:31:40.1 | 1st place, gold medalist(s) |
| Shakti Álvarez; Jazmín López; Kenya Maturana; Antonia Sánchez | 4x400m Relay | 3:31.95 | 3rd place, bronze medalist(s) |

Mixed

| Athlete | Event | Final | |
| Athlete | Event | Result | Rank |
|---|---|---|---|
| Shakti Álvarez; Amado Amador; Kenya Maturana; José Manuel Rodríguez | 4x400m Relay | 3:30.02 | 5 |

Combined Events

Men's Decathlon

| Athlete | Event | 100 m | LJ | SP | HJ | 400 m | 110H | DT | PV | JT | 1500 m | Total | Rank |
|---|---|---|---|---|---|---|---|---|---|---|---|---|---|
| Darío Rodríguez | Result | 10.73 | 6.47 | 13.08 | 1.85 | 48.79 | 14.93 | 37.63 | 4.00 | 42.81 | 4:45.04 | 7050 | 4 |
| Darío Rodríguez | Points | 922 | 691 | 672 | 670 | 871 | 858 | 617 | 617 | 483 | 649 | 7050 | 4 |
| Abimelec Zamorano | Result | 11.22 | 7.03 | 11.82 | 1.91 | 48.41 | 14.95 | 37.56 | NM | 59.80 | 5:18.81 | 6502 | 6 |
| Abimelec Zamorano | Points | 812 | 821 | 595 | 723 | 889 | 856 | 615 | 0 | 735 | 456 | 6502 | 6 |

Women's Heptathlon

| Athlete | Event | 100H | HJ | SP | 200 m | LJ | JT | 800 m | Final | Rank |
|---|---|---|---|---|---|---|---|---|---|---|
| Valeria Paez | Result | 14.76 | 1.60 | 10.26 | 27.09 | 5.41 | 35.35 | 2:28.37 | 4825 | 5 |
| Valeria Paez | Points | 874 | 736 | 546 | 704 | 674 | 578 | 713 | 4825 | 5 |

=== Field ===
Men

| Athlete | Event | Final | |
| Athlete | Event | Distance | Rank |
|---|---|---|---|
| Jesús Vázquez | High Jump | 2.07 | 3rd place, bronze medalist(s) |
| Josué García | Pole Vault | 4.60 | =6 |
| Ángel Hernández | Pole Vault | 4.60 | 8 |
| Jesús Guzmán | Shot Put | 17.08 | 7 |
| Guillermo López | Shot Put | 16.09 | 9 |
| Jesús Guzmán | Discus Throw | 51.42 | 9 |
| Jesús Magaña | Discus Throw | 55.02 | 5 |
| José Eduardo Chávez | Hammer Throw | 65.78 | 5 |

Women

| Athlete | Event | Final | |
| Athlete | Event | Distance | Rank |
|---|---|---|---|
| Diana García | Pole Vault | 3.80 | 4 |
| Andrea Velasco | Pole Vault | 3.80 | =5 |
| Paola del Real | Triple Jump | 13.58 | 2nd place, silver medalist(s) |
| Valeria Uribe | Triple Jump | 12.88 | 6 |
| Paola Bueno | Hammer Throw | 61.84 | 3rd place, bronze medalist(s) |
| Elvia Canela | Hammer Throw | 58.03 | 7 |

== Badminton ==
| Athlete | Event | Round of 32 | Round of 16 | Quarterfinals | Semifinals | Final | |
| Athlete | Event | Opposition Result | Opposition Result | Opposition Result | Opposition Result | Opposition Result | Rank |
|---|---|---|---|---|---|---|---|
| Néstor González | Men's Singles | Marcano (TRI); W 21-17, 22-20 | Xu (USA); L 17-21, 10-21 | Did not advance | | | =9 |
| Maximiliano Torres | Men's Singles | Martínez (PAR); L Walkover | Did not advance | | | | =17 |
| Miriam Rodríguez | Women's Singles | Hernández (ESA); W 17-21, 21-16, 21-13 | Lin (USA); L 8-21, 5-21 | Did not advance | | | =9 |
| Vanesa García | Women's Singles | Contreras (CUB); W 21-9, 21-13 | Rodas (PAR); W 21-8, 21-6 | Murosaki (BRA); W 21-18, 21-9 | Chan (CAN); L 8-21, 11-21 | —N/a | 3rd place, bronze medalist(s) |
| Néstor González; Vanesa García | Mixed Doubles | Trinidad and Tobago; W 21-16, 21-16 | United States; L 10-21, 10-21 | Did not advance | | | =9 |
| Maximiliano Torres; Miriam Rodríguez | Mixed Doubles | Argentina; L Walkover | Did not advance | | | | =17 |

== 3x3 Basketball ==
| Athlete | Event | Pool play | | | Quarterfinal | Semifinal | Reclassification 5th-8th | | Final / BM | |
| Athlete | Event | Opposition Score | Opposition Score | Group Rank | Opposition Score | Opposition Score | Opposition Score | Opposition Score | Opposition Score | Rank |
|---|---|---|---|---|---|---|---|---|---|---|
| Gabriel Moreno; Ricardo Maciel; Jesús Escobedo; Erick Barea | Men's tournament | Paraguay; L 13-21 | Cayman Islands; L 17-19 | 3 | Did not advance | | | | | 10 |
| Anisa Jeffries; Loriette Maciel; Laura Plascencia; Regina Espinosa | Women's tournament | Guatemala; W 21-4 | Brazil; W 15-14 | 1 | Uruguay; W 21-8 | Paraguay; W 14-8 | —N/a | | Canada; L 13-18 | 2nd place, silver medalist(s) |

== Canoeing ==
Men's

| Athlete | Event | Qualification | | Semifinal | | Final | |
| Athlete | Event | Result | Rank | Result | Rank | Result | Rank |
|---|---|---|---|---|---|---|---|
| José Gil | C1 500m | —N/a | | | | 1:56.76 | 5 |
| José Gil | C1 1000m | —N/a | | | | 4:26.33 | 3rd place, bronze medalist(s) |
| José Gil; Emiliano López | C2 500m | —N/a | | | | 2:30.36 | 5 |
| Jahir Zúñiga | K1 500m | 1:48.28 | 4 S | 1:50.43 | 4 F | 1:47.05 | 5 |
| Jahir Zúñiga | K1 1000m | 4:10.42 | 2 F | Bye | | 4:02.05 | 5 |
| Diego Popa; Juan Rodríguez | K2 500m | DSQ | | Did not advance | | | |
| Diego Popa; Juan Rodríguez; Mauricio Ureña; Jahir Zúñiga | K4 500m | —N/a | | | | 1:26.97 | 4 |

Women's

| Athlete | Event | Qualification | | Semifinal | | Final | |
| Athlete | Event | Result | Rank | Result | Rank | Result | Rank |
|---|---|---|---|---|---|---|---|
| Nicol Guzmán | C1 200m | 53.16 | 2 F | Bye | | 51.33 | 4 |
| Nicol Guzmán | C1 500m | 2:17.19 | 2 F | Bye | | 2:14.49 | 2nd place, silver medalist(s) |
| Nicol Guzmán; Ana Martínez | C2 500m | —N/a | | | | DNF | |
| Ana Hernández | K1 200m | 49.55 | 3 F | Bye | | 46.94 | 4 |
| Ana Hernández | K1 500m | 2:02.37 | 1 F | Bye | | 2:05.13 | 4 |
| Naomi Campos; Ana Hernández | K2 500m | 1:56.61 | 1 F | Bye | | 1:59.61 | 1st place, gold medalist(s) |
| Naomi Campos; Ana Hernández; Daniela Salazar; Ana Ureña | K4 500m | —N/a | | | | 1:41.25 | 2nd place, silver medalist(s) |

Mixed

| Athlete | Event | Qualification | | Semifinal | | Final | |
| Athlete | Event | Result | Rank | Result | Rank | Result | Rank |
|---|---|---|---|---|---|---|---|
| José Gil; Nicol Guzmán | C2 500m | —N/a | | | | 2:19.61 | 3rd place, bronze medalist(s) |
| Ana Hernández; Diego Popa | K2 500m | 1:51.98 | 3 S | 1:53.74 | 1 F | DNF | |

Rank indicates position within each heat for the respective round. F= Qualified directly to the Final; S= Qualified for the semifinal; DSQ = Disqualified.; DNF = Did not finish.

== Cycling ==
=== Road ===
| Athlete | Event | Final | |
| Athlete | Event | Result | Rank |
|---|---|---|---|
| Heriberto Quiroz | Men's time trial | 52:09.11 | 11 |
| José Antonio Prieto | Men's time trial | 49:23.25 | 2nd place, silver medalist(s) |
| Marcelo Garza | Men's road race | DNF | |
| José Antonio Prieto | Men's road race | 3:18:34 | 1st place, gold medalist(s) |
| Heriberto Quiroz | Men's road race | 3:23:26 | 11 |
| Arath Sánchez | Men's road race | DNF | |
| Renata Guerra | Women's time trial | 39:53.89 | 9 |
| Valeria León | Women's time trial | 41:26.77 | 14 |
| Nicole Córdova | Women's road race | 2:52:04 | 22 |
| Renata Guerra | Women's road race | 2:52:03 | 13 |
| María Figueroa | Women's road race | 2:52:04 | 23 |
| Valeria León | Women's road race | 2:52:05 | 27 |

=== Track ===
Sprint and Pursuit

| Athlete | Event | Qualification | | Round of 16 | Repechage | Quarterfinals | Semifinals | Final/BM | |
| Athlete | Event | Time Speed (km/h) | Rank | Opposition Time Speed (km/h) | Opposition Time Speed (km/h) | Opposition Time Speed (km/h) | Opposition Time Speed (km/h) | Opposition Time Speed (km/h) | Rank |
|---|---|---|---|---|---|---|---|---|---|
| Jafet López | Men's Individual; Sprint | 10.342 (69.619) | 6 Q | Serrano (ARG); W 10.458 (68.847) | —N/a | Torres (VEN); L 10.734 (68.040); L 12.544 (62.970) | Did not advance | | 6 |
| Etan Nuño | Men's Individual; Sprint | 10.443 (68.946) | 9 Q | Betique (ARG); L 11.099 (67.221) | Garcés (VEN); Wadilie (SUR); W 10.716 (67.353) | Jaramillo (COL); L 10.681 (68.539); L 12.331 (62.789) | Did not advance | | 8 |
| Jafet López; Etan Nuño; Ian Navarro | Men's Team; Sprint | 45.689 (59.095) | 2 QG | —N/a | | | | Colombia; L 45.355 (60.284) | 2nd place, silver medalist(s) |
| Fernando Nava; Marcelo Garza; Kevin Ortega; Arath Sánchez | Men's Team; Pursuit | 4:11.120 (57.343) | 3 QB | —N/a | | | | Venezuela; W 4:10.729 (57.433) | 3rd place, bronze medalist(s) |
| Vanessa González | Women's Individual; Sprint | 11.863 (60.693) | 9 Q | Wallace (TTO); L 11.872 (59.484) | Martínez (VEN); Cantú (MEX); L 12.334 (58.665) | Did not advance | | | 10 |
| Andrea Cantú | Women's Individual; Sprint | 12.242 (58.814) | 12 Q | Cuadrado (COL); L 12.058 (59.736) | Martínez (VEN); González (MEX); L 12.461 (58.665) | Did not advance | | | 12 |
| Andrea Cantú; Carla Dosamante; Vanessa González | Women's Team; Sprint | 52.255 (51.670) | 5 | Did not advance | | | | | 5 |
| Nicole Córdova; María Figueroa; Viviana Arriaga; Giovana López | Women's Team; Pursuit | 4:50.240 (49.614) | 3 QB | —N/a | | | | Argentina; W 4:49.192 (49.794) | 3rd place, bronze medalist(s) |

Q=Qualified for next round; QG=Qualified for Gold Medal; QB=Qualified for Bronze Medal

Keirin

| Athlete | Event | Round 1 | | Final/BM | |
| Athlete | Event | Time Speed (km/h) | Rank | Time Speed (km/h) | Rank |
|---|---|---|---|---|---|
| Jafet López | Men's Keirin | 11.427 (63.009) | 4 Q7-12 | 11.208 (64.240) | 9 |
| Etan Nuño | Men's Keirin | 10.943 (65.795) | 4 Q7-12 | 10.937 (65.832) | 8 |
| Andrea Cantú | Women's Keirin | 13.952 (51.606) | 5 Q7-12 | 12.690 (56.738) | 8 |
| Carla Dosamante | Women's Keirin | 12.363 (58.238) | 5 Q7-12 | 12.799 (56.254) | 11 |

Round 1 rank indicates position within each heat. Q=Qualified for Gold; Q7-12=Qualified for positions 7-12

Madison

| Athlete | Event | Sprints | | | | | | | | | | | | Lap Points | Total Points | Rank |
| Athlete | Event | 1 | 2 | 3 | 4 | 5 | 6 | 7 | 8 | 9 | 10 | 11 | 12 | Lap Points | Total Points | Rank |
|---|---|---|---|---|---|---|---|---|---|---|---|---|---|---|---|---|
| Fernando Nava; Marcelo Garza | Men's Madison | 0 | 0 | 5 | 5 | 3 | 3 | 3 | 0 | 2 | 3 | 3 | 10 | 20 | 57 | 2nd place, silver medalist(s) |
| María Figueroa; Viviana Arriaga | Women's Madison | 0 | 1 | 0 | 0 | 1 | 1 | 0 | 0 | —N/a | | | | 0 | 3 | 4 |

Omnium

| Athlete | Event | Scratch | | Tempo Race | | Elimination | | Points Race | | Total Points | Rank |
| Athlete | Event | Rank | Points | Rank | Points | Rank | Points | Rank | Points | Total Points | Rank |
|---|---|---|---|---|---|---|---|---|---|---|---|
| Fernando Nava | Men's Omnium | 2 | 38 | 6 | 30 | 1 | 40 | 7 | 5 | 113 | 6 |
| María Figueroa | Women's Omnium | DNS | | | | | | | | | |

=== Mountain ===
| Athlete | Event | Final | |
| Athlete | Event | Result | Rank |
|---|---|---|---|
| Nils Gutiérrez | Men's Cross-country | 1:21:42 | 5 |
| Iván Aguilar | Men's Cross-country | 1:16:52 | 1st place, gold medalist(s) |
| Yosselin Morales | Women's Cross-country | 1:20:24 | 6 |
| María Flores | Women's Cross-country | 1:23:30 | 9 |

=== BMX ===
Freestyle

| Athlete | Event | Qualification | | Final | |
| Athlete | Event | Points | Rank | Points / Time | Rank |
|---|---|---|---|---|---|
| Dennis Jiménez | Men's Freestyle | 41.83 | 7 QA | 51.67 | 4 |
| Sofía Baez | Women's Freestyle | 45.50 | 4 QA | 51.67 | 4 |
| Valeria Segura | Women's Freestyle | 35.50 | 5 QB | 35.67 | 5 |

QA=Qualified for Final A; QB=Qualified for Final B

Racing

| Athlete | Event | Time Trial | | Motos | | | | Semifinal | | | | Final | Rank |
| Athlete | Event | Time | Rank | Time [Points] | Time [Points] | Time [Points] | Total Points | Time [Points] | Time [Points] | Time [Points] | Total Points | Final | Rank |
|---|---|---|---|---|---|---|---|---|---|---|---|---|---|
| Édgar Rodarte | Men's Racing | 35.652 | 11 | 35.890 [5] | 35.902 [5] | 35.845 [4] | 14 | Did not advance | | | | | =14 |
| Metztli González | Women's Racing | 40.597 | 9 | 41.506 [4] | 39.151 [3] | 40.209 [3] | 10 S | 39.687 [5] | 41.145 [5] | 41.394 [5] | 15 | Did not advance | =9 |
| Nicole Jiménez | Women's Racing | 42.954 | 14 | 41.799 [4] | 42.990 [5] | 43.328 [5] | 14 | Did not advance | | | | | 13 |

S=Qualified for the Semifinal.

== Diving ==
| Athlete | Event | Qualification | | Final | |
| Athlete | Event | Points | Rank | Points | Rank |
|---|---|---|---|---|---|
| Jesús Agundez | 1m springboard | 379.90 | 1 Q | 359.45 | 4 |
| Jesús Agundez | 3m springboard | 384.70 | 2 Q | 414.50 | 2nd place, silver medalist(s) |
| David Vázquez | 1m springboard | 338.25 | 5 Q | 373.50 | 2nd place, silver medalist(s) |
| David Vázquez | 3m springboard | 357.35 | 7 Q | 417.65 | 1st place, gold medalist(s) |
| Jesús Agundez; David Vázquez | 3m synchronized springboard | —N/a | | 409.29 | 1st place, gold medalist(s) |
| Emilio Treviño | 10m platform | 406.60 | 4 Q | 382.90 | 6 |
| Kenny Zamudio | 10m platform | 428.35 | 3 Q | 467.75 | 1st place, gold medalist(s) |
| Emilio Treviño; Kenny Zamudio | 10m synchronized platform | —N/a | | 380.01 | 2nd place, silver medalist(s) |
| Lía Cueva | 1m springboard | 187.10 | 10 Q | 261.45 | 3rd place, bronze medalist(s) |
| Lía Cueva | 3m springboard | 205.40 | 7 Q | 292.95 | 3rd place, bronze medalist(s) |
| Mía Cueva | 1m springboard | 246.15 | =1 Q | 267.95 | 2nd place, silver medalist(s) |
| Mía Cueva | 3m springboard | 272.30 | 1 Q | 319.45 | 2nd place, silver medalist(s) |
| Lía Cueva; Mía Cueva | 3m synchronized springboard | —N/a | | 289.32 | 1st place, gold medalist(s) |
| Suri Cueva | 10m platform | 293.60 | 3 Q | 310.20 | 4 |
| María Sánchez | 10m platform | 294.20 | 2 Q | 309.20 | 5 |
| Suri Cueva; María Sánchez | 10m synchronized platform | —N/a | | 279.48 | 2nd place, silver medalist(s) |

== Fencing ==
| Athlete | Event | Pool play | | | | | | Round of 16 | Quarterfinal | Semifinal | Final / BM | |
| Athlete | Event | Opposition Score | Opposition Score | Opposition Score | Opposition Score | Opposition Score | Rank | Opposition Score | Opposition Score | Opposition Score | Opposition Score | Rank |
|---|---|---|---|---|---|---|---|---|---|---|---|---|
| Daniel Bravo | Men's Epeé | Cabrera (CRC); L 2-4 | García (CUB); L 2-5 | Naranjo (ECU); L 1-5 | Schembri (ISV); L 2-5 | Groupierre (ESA); L 3-5 | 6 | Schembri (ISV); L 5-15 | Did not advance | | | =9 |
| Darick Galicia | Men's Foil | Aripe (BRA); L 4-5 | Naranjo (CHI); L 1-5 | Aguinaga (ECU); L 2-5 | Galvez (BOL); W 5-0 | —N/a | 4 | Antonelli (VEN); W 15-7 | Fukuda (PER); L 3-15 | Did not advance | | =5 |
| Santiago Delgado | Men's Sabre | Lim (USA); W 5-4 | Martin (JAM); W 5-1 | Mattoo (PUR); W 5-3 | Vargas (COL); L 4-5 | —N/a | 2 | Valencia (ECU); W 15-5 | Mayer (BOL); L 4-15 | Did not advance | | =5 |
| Ana Margarita Paredes | Women's Epeé | González (COL); W 5-2 | Botazzini (ARG); W 5-2 | Caratin (BRA); W 4-3 | Naranjo (ECU); W 5-2 | —N/a | 1 | —N/a | Caratin (BRA); W 15-14 | Hanspach (PAR); W 15-13 | Guerrero (VEN); L 7-15 | 2nd place, silver medalist(s) |
| Tamara Oropeza | Women's Foil | Machado (VEN); L 2-5 | Montaño (BOL); W 5-4 | Cap (GUA); L 3-5 | Naranjo (ECU); L 1-5 | —N/a | 4 | Mena (ESA); L 7-15 | Did not advance | | | =9 |
| Ana Karem Carvajal | Women's Sabre | Escanlar (URU); W 5-0 | Borrelli (ARG); L 2-5 | Barrera (GUA); W 5-3 | Hwang (PUR); L 0-5 | Huai (USA); L 2-5 | 4 | Borrelli (ARG); L 5-15 | Did not advance | | | =9 |

== Field Hockey ==
Mexico qualified a men's and women's team of 16 athletes each (32 athletes in total).

Summary

| Team | Event | Group play | | | | 5th-8th Place Classification | | Rank |
| Team | Event | Opposition Result | Opposition Result | Opposition Result | Group Rank | Opposition Result | Opposition Result | Rank |
|---|---|---|---|---|---|---|---|---|
| Mexico | Men's tournament | Canada; W 4-3 | Trinidad and Tobago; L 1-2 | Chile; L 0-3 | 3 | Paraguay; W 5-0 | Brazil; W 4-0 | 5 |
| Mexico | Women's tournament | United States; L 0-8 | Guyana; W 9-1 | Chile; L 2-4 | 3 | Paraguay; W 4-1 | Canada; Cancelled | 5 |

=== Men's ===
Pool B

| Pos | Team | Pld | W | D | L | GF | GA | GD | Pts | Qualification |
|---|---|---|---|---|---|---|---|---|---|---|
| 1 | Canada | 3 | 2 | 0 | 1 | 11 | 5 | +6 | 6 | Semi-finals |
| 2 | Chile | 3 | 2 | 0 | 1 | 7 | 3 | +4 | 6 | Semi-finals |
| 3 | Mexico | 3 | 1 | 0 | 2 | 5 | 8 | −3 | 3 | |
| 4 | Trinidad and Tobago | 3 | 1 | 0 | 2 | 4 | 11 | −7 | 3 | |

Source: FIH
Rules for classification: 1) points; 2) matches won; 3) goal difference; 4) goals for; 5) head-to-head result; 6) field goals for.

10 August 2025
09:30

| Canada | 3–4 | Mexico |
|---|---|---|
| De Souza 19'; Simonson 20'; Campbell 47' | Report | Francis 3'; Cuate 21'; Rodríguez 50'; Santillan 54' |

Umpires:
Basilio Canale (ARG)
Kevin George (TTO)

12 August 2025
09:30

| Mexico | 1–2 | Trinidad and Tobago |
|---|---|---|
| Cuate 30' | Report | Wyatt 35'; Rowe 48' |

Umpires:
Basilio Canale (ARG)
Ricardo Albertz (CHI)

14 August 2025
11:30

| Mexico | 0–3 | Chile |
|---|---|---|
| | Report | Duisberg 16'; Vargas 56'; Loehnert 59' |

Umpires:
Pambavasan Manikandan (CAN)
Kevin George (TTO)

Cross-overs

16 August 2025
11:45

| Paraguay | 0–5 | Mexico |
|---|---|---|
| | Report | Santillan 19', 36'; Rodríguez 21'; González 49'; Cuate 56' |

Umpires:
Claudio Martinez (URU)
Andrey Umana (CRC)

Fifth and sixth place

18 August 2025
11:45

| Brazil | 0–4 | Mexico |
|---|---|---|
| | Report | Estrada 40'; Santillan 42'; Cuate 57'; Francis 60' |

Umpires:
Brian Tyson (USA)
Fabian Romero (PAR)

=== Women's ===
Pool A

| Pos | Team | Pld | W | D | L | GF | GA | GD | Pts | Qualification |
|---|---|---|---|---|---|---|---|---|---|---|
| 1 | United States | 3 | 3 | 0 | 0 | 23 | 0 | +23 | 9 | Semi-finals |
| 2 | Chile | 3 | 2 | 0 | 1 | 16 | 7 | +9 | 6 | Semi-finals |
| 3 | Mexico | 3 | 1 | 0 | 2 | 11 | 13 | −2 | 3 | |
| 4 | Guyana | 3 | 0 | 0 | 3 | 2 | 32 | −30 | 0 | |

Source: FIH
Rules for classification: 1) points; 2) matches won; 3) goal difference; 4) goals for; 5) head-to-head result; 6) field goals for.

11 August 2025
09:30

| United States | 8–0 | Mexico |
|---|---|---|
| McVeigh 3', 5'; Bianco 15'; Masters 21'; Schenk 27', 56'; Beach 49'; Moore 57' | Report |

Umpires:
Macarena Dieni (ARG)
Ricardo Albertz (CHI)

13 August 2025
09:30

| Mexico | 9–1 | Guyana |
|---|---|---|
| Moreno 5'; Castillo 14'; Espinoza 16', 37', 43', 51'; Ortíz 34'; Guzman 34'; Noria 50' | Report | Poole 30' |

Umpires:
Catalina Wenzel (CHI)
Katelyn Makovec (USA)

15 August 2025
11:30

| Mexico | 2–4 | Chile |
|---|---|---|
| Guzman 14'; Espinoza 29' | Report | Luders 2', 18'; Caravia 30+'; Arrieta 53' |

Umpires:
Katelyn Makovec (USA)
Macarena Dieni (ARG)

Cross-overs

17 August 2025
11:45

| Paraguay | 1–4 | Mexico |
|---|---|---|
| Sanabria 48' | Report | Cruz 8'; Ortíz 29'; Espinoza 44', 57' |

Umpires:
Claudio Martinez (URU)
Sofia Aleman (URU)

Fifth and sixth place

19 August 2025
11:45

| Canada | Cancelled (Note: Extreme weather conditions the Women’s 5/6 Place Match scheduled for today is cancelled.) | Mexico |
|---|---|---|
| | Report |

Umpires:
Gaston Folcher (ARG)
Catalina Wenzel (CHI)

== Golf ==
Men

| Athlete | Event | Round 1 | | Round 2 | | Round 3 | | Total | | Rank |
| Athlete | Event | Score | Par | Score | Par | Score | Par | Score | Par | Rank |
|---|---|---|---|---|---|---|---|---|---|---|
| Lucca Carrasco | Individual | 74 | +2 | 80 | +8 | 90 | +18 | 244 | +28 | =25 |
| Eduardo Kuri | Individual | 74 | +2 | 82 | +10 | 83 | +11 | 239 | +23 | =18 |

Women

| Athlete | Event | Round 1 | | Round 2 | | Round 3 | | Total | | Rank |
| Athlete | Event | Score | Par | Score | Par | Score | Par | Score | Par | Rank |
|---|---|---|---|---|---|---|---|---|---|---|
| María José Barragán | Individual | 77 | +5 | 78 | +6 | 79 | +7 | 234 | +18 | =5 |
| Regina Olvera | Individual | 82 | +10 | 83 | +11 | 87 | +15 | 252 | +36 | =22 |

Mixed

| Athlete | Event | Round 1 | | Round 2 | | Total | | Rank |
| Athlete | Event | Score | Par | Score | Par | Score | Par | Rank |
|---|---|---|---|---|---|---|---|---|
| María José Barragán; Lucca Carrasco; Eduardo Kuri; Regina Olvera | Mixed Team | 81; 76; ~~77~~; ~~87~~ | +9 +4; ~~+5~~; ~~+15~~ | 78; 70; ~~74~~; ~~89~~ | +6 -2; ~~+2~~; ~~+17~~ | 305 | +17 | 9 |

In the mixed team competition, the highest male and female scores in each round are not counted towards the total.

== Gymnastics ==
=== Artistic ===
Men

| Athlete | Event | Qualification | | | | | | | | | | Final | | | | | | | | | |
| Athlete | Event | Apparatus | | | | | | | | Total | Rank | Apparatus | | | | | | | | Total | Rank |
| Athlete | Event | F | PH | R | V | | | PB | HB | Total | Rank | F | PH | R | V | | | PB | HB | Total | Rank |
| Athlete | Event | F | PH | R | 1 | 2 | Average | PB | HB | Total | Rank | F | PH | R | 1 | 2 | Average | PB | HB | Total | Rank |
|---|---|---|---|---|---|---|---|---|---|---|---|---|---|---|---|---|---|---|---|---|---|
| Áaron Ibarra | Individual; All-around | | | | | | | | | | | 12.950 | 11.800 | 11.700 | 12.300 | | | 12.750 | 10.600 | 72.100 | 12 |
| Juan Pablo Dueñas | Individual; All-around | | | | | | | | | | | 11.550 | 11.900 | 11.100 | 13.250 | | | 12.350 | 11.450 | 71.600 | 16 |
| Gael Rosales | Individual; All-around | | | | | | | | | | | 11.700 | 10.200 | 11.350 | 12.400 | | | 12.200 | 11.350 | 69.200 | 21 |
| Lorenzo Zaragoza | Individual; All-around | | | | | | | | | | | 12.450 | 11.450 | 12.350 | 13.450 | | | 11.550 | 12.250 | 73.500 | 8 |
| Áaron Ibarra | Floor | 12.950 | | | | | | | | 12.950 | 3 Q | 12.333 | | | | | | | | 12.333 | 4 |
| Áaron Ibarra | Pommel; Horse | | 11.800 | | | | | | | 11.800 | 13 | Did not advance | | | | | | | | | 13 |
| Áaron Ibarra | Rings | | | 11.700 | | | | | | 11.700 | 10 | Did not advance | | | | | | | | | 10 |
| Áaron Ibarra | Vault | | | | 12.300 | | | | | 12.300 | —N/a | Did not advance | | | | | | | | | NR |
| Áaron Ibarra | Parallel; Bars | | | | | | | 12.750 | | 12.750 | 5 Q | | | | | | | 12.533 | | 12.533 | 3rd place, bronze medalist(s) |
| Áaron Ibarra | Horizontal; Bar | | | | | | | | 10.600 | 10.600 | 29 | Did not advance | | | | | | | | | 29 |
| Juan Pablo Dueñas | Floor | 11.550 | | | | | | | | 11.550 | 25 | Did not advance | | | | | | | | | 25 |
| Juan Pablo Dueñas | Pommel; Horse | | 11.900 | | | | | | | 11.900 | =8 Q | | 11.866 | | | | | | | 11.866 | =4 |
| Juan Pablo Dueñas | Rings | | | 11.100 | | | | | | 11.100 | 23 | Did not advance | | | | | | | | | 23 |
| Juan Pablo Dueñas | Vault | | | | 13.250 | 12.450 | 12.850 | | | 12.850 | 9 q | | | | 10.933 | 11.900 | 11.416 | | | 11.416 | 8 |
| Juan Pablo Dueñas | Parallel; Bars | | | | | | | 12.250 | | 12.250 | 7 Q | | | | | | | 11.133 | | 11.133 | 8 |
| Juan Pablo Dueñas | Horizontal; Bar | | | | | | | | 11.450 | 11.450 | 19 | Did not advance | | | | | | | | | 19 |
| Gael Rosales | Floor | 11.700 | | | | | | | | 11.700 | 24 | Did not advance | | | | | | | | | 24 |
| Gael Rosales | Pommel; Horse | | 10.200 | | | | | | | 10.200 | 32 | Did not advance | | | | | | | | | 32 |
| Gael Rosales | Rings | | | 11.350 | | | | | | 11.350 | 17 | Did not advance | | | | | | | | | 17 |
| Gael Rosales | Vault | | | | 12.400 | | | | | 12.400 | —N/a | Did not advance | | | | | | | | | NR |
| Gael Rosales | Parallel; Bars | | | | | | | 12.200 | | 12.200 | 9 | Did not advance | | | | | | | | | 9 |
| Gael Rosales | Horizontal; Bar | | | | | | | | 11.350 | 11.350 | 20 | Did not advance | | | | | | | | | 20 |
| Lorenzo Zaragoza | Floor | 12.450 | | | | | | | | 12.450 | 9 | Did not advance | | | | | | | | | 9 |
| Lorenzo Zaragoza | Pommel; Horse | | 11.450 | | | | | | | 11.450 | 19 | Did not advance | | | | | | | | | 19 |
| Lorenzo Zaragoza | Rings | | | 12.350 | | | | | | 12.350 | 2 Q | | | 12.600 | | | | | | 12.600 | 1st place, gold medalist(s) |
| Lorenzo Zaragoza | Vault | | | | 13.450 | | | | | 13.450 | —N/a | Did not advance | | | | | | | | | NR |
| Lorenzo Zaragoza | Parallel; Bars | | | | | | | 11.550 | | 11.550 | 19 | Did not advance | | | | | | | | | 19 |
| Lorenzo Zaragoza | Horizontal; Bar | | | | | | | | 12.250 | 12.250 | 8 Q | | | | | | | | 12.566 | 12.566 | 5 |
| Áaron Ibarra; Juan Pablo Dueñas; Gael Rosales; Lorenzo Zaragoza | Group; All-around | | | | | | | | | | | 37.100 | 35.150 | 35.400 | 39.100 | | | 37.300 | 35.050 | 219.100 | 3rd place, bronze medalist(s) |

For the group all-around, the lowest individual score is deleted. For both the group and individual all-around, the best vault score is taken for the final calculations. Some competitors only chose to do one vault instead of two but were not eligible for the individual vault final.

Women

| Athlete | Event | Qualification | | | | | | | | Final | | | | | | | |
| Athlete | Event | Apparatus | | | | | | Total | Rank | Apparatus | | | | | | Total | Rank |
| Athlete | Event | V | | | UB | BB | F | Total | Rank | V | | | UB | BB | F | Total | Rank |
| Athlete | Event | 1 | 2 | Average | UB | BB | F | Total | Rank | 1 | 2 | Average | UB | BB | F | Total | Rank |
|---|---|---|---|---|---|---|---|---|---|---|---|---|---|---|---|---|---|
| Maia Abascal | Individual; All-around | | | | | | | | | 12.600 | | | 9.250 | 11.100 | 11.150 | 44.100 | 23 |
| Dominica Escartín | Individual; All-around | | | | | | | | | 13.200 | | | 12.150 | 10.850 | 11.950 | 48.150 | 8 |
| Debanhi Ochoa | Individual; All-around | | | | | | | | | 11.800 | | | 9.850 | 10.550 | 11.650 | 43.850 | =24 |
| Emma Martínez | Individual; All-around | | | | | | | | | 11.350 | | | 7.200 | 11.650 | 11.150 | 41.350 | 35 |
| Maia Abascal | Vault | 12.600 | | | | | | 12.600 | —N/a | Did not advance | | | | | | | NR |
| Maia Abascal | Uneven; Bars | | | | 9.250 | | | 9.250 | 35 | Did not advance | | | | | | | 35 |
| Maia Abascal | Balance; Beam | | | | | 11.100 | | 11.100 | 21 | Did not advance | | | | | | | 21 |
| Maia Abascal | Floor | | | | | | 11.150 | 11.150 | 21 | Did not advance | | | | | | | 21 |
| Dominica Escartín | Vault | 13.200 | 12.550 | 12.875 | | | | 12.875 | 9 q | 12.933 | 12.733 | 12.833 | | | | 12.833 | 4 |
| Dominica Escartín | Uneven; Bars | | | | 12.150 | | | 12.150 | 7 Q | | | | 12.166 | | | 12.166 | 3rd place, bronze medalist(s) |
| Dominica Escartín | Balance; Beam | | | | | 10.850 | | 10.850 | 24 | Did not advance | | | | | | | 24 |
| Dominica Escartín | Floor | | | | | | 11.950 | 11.950 | 7 Q | | | | | | 12.266 | 12.266 | 3rd place, bronze medalist(s) |
| Debanhi Ochoa | Vault | 11.800 | | | | | | 11.800 | —N/a | Did not advance | | | | | | | NR |
| Debanhi Ochoa | Uneven; Bars | | | | 9.850 | | | 9.850 | 27 | Did not advance | | | | | | | 27 |
| Debanhi Ochoa | Balance; Beam | | | | | 10.550 | | 10.550 | 28 | Did not advance | | | | | | | 28 |
| Debanhi Ochoa | Floor | | | | | | 11.650 | 11.650 | 14 | Did not advance | | | | | | | 14 |
| Emma Martínez | Vault | 11.350 | 11.850 | 11.600 | | | | 11.600 | 19 | Did not advance | | | | | | | 19 |
| Emma Martínez | Uneven; Bars | | | | 7.200 | | | 7.200 | 51 | Did not advance | | | | | | | 51 |
| Emma Martínez | Balance; Beam | | | | | 11.650 | | 11.650 | 12 | Did not advance | | | | | | | 12 |
| Emma Martínez | Floor | | | | | | 11.150 | 11.150 | 21 | Did not advance | | | | | | | 21 |
| Maia Abascal; Dominica Escartín; Debanhi Ochoa; Emma Martínez | Group; All-around | | | | | | | | | 37.600 | | | 31.250 | 33.600 | 34.750 | 137.200 | 5 |

For the group all-around, the lowest individual score is deleted. For both the group and individual all-around, the best vault score is taken for the final calculations. Some competitors only chose to do one vault instead of two but were not eligible for the individual vault final. q = Competitor qualified to individual final as other countries exceeded the allowed quota of 2 athletes per apparatus.

=== Rhythmic ===
| Athlete | Event | Qualification | | | | | | Final | | | | | |
| Athlete | Event | Hoop | Ball | Clubs | Ribbon | Total | Rank | Hoop | Ball | Clubs | Ribbon | Total | Rank |
|---|---|---|---|---|---|---|---|---|---|---|---|---|---|
| Ana Luisa Abraham | Individual; All-around | | | | | | | 23.050 | 23.800 | 24.700 | 24.050 | 95.600 | 4 |
| Marijose Delgado | Individual; All-around | | | | | | | 24.150 | 23.000 | 24.250 | 22.800 | 94.200 | 5 |
| Ana Luisa Abraham | Hoop | 23.050 | | | | 23.050 | 5 Q | 23.900 | | | | 23.900 | 4 |
| Ana Luisa Abraham | Ball | | 23.800 | | | 23.800 | 4 Q | | 24.000 | | | 24.000 | 1st place, gold medalist(s) |
| Ana Luisa Abraham | Clubs | | | 24.700 | | 24.700 | 3 Q | | | 24.750 | | 24.750 | 4 |
| Ana Luisa Abraham | Ribbon | | | | 24.050 | 24.050 | 3 Q | | | | 23.100 | 23.100 | 4 |
| Marijose Delgado | Hoop | 24.150 | | | | 24.150 | 3 Q | 23.950 | | | | 23.950 | 3rd place, bronze medalist(s) |
| Marijose Delgado | Ball | | 23.000 | | | 23.000 | 6 Q | | 19.850 | | | 19.850 | 7 |
| Marijose Delgado | Clubs | | | 24.250 | | 24.250 | 5 Q | | | 22.600 | | 22.600 | 6 |
| Marijose Delgado | Ribbon | | | | 22.800 | 22.800 | 6 Q | | | | 22.450 | 22.450 | 6 |
| Martha Coldwell; Ana Carolina Martínez; Jaydi Novelo; Bárbara Ponce; Fernanda Ramírez | Group; All-around | | | | | | | 23.200 | | 22.750 | | 45.950 | 1st place, gold medalist(s) |
| Martha Coldwell; Ana Carolina Martínez; Jaydi Novelo; Bárbara Ponce; Fernanda Ramírez | 5 Hoops | 23.200 | | | | 23.200 | 2 Q | 23.750 | | | | 23.750 | 2nd place, silver medalist(s) |
| Martha Coldwell; Ana Carolina Martínez; Jaydi Novelo; Bárbara Ponce; Fernanda Ramírez | 5 Clubs | | | 22.750 | | 22.750 | 1 Q | | | 23.650 | | 23.650 | 1st place, gold medalist(s) |

=== Trampoline ===
| Athlete | Event | Qualification | | | | Final | |
| Athlete | Event | Score 1 | Score 2 | Total | Rank | Score | Rank |
|---|---|---|---|---|---|---|---|
| Donovan Guevara | Men's Individual | 47.88 | 56.68 | 104.56 | 2 Q | 58.03 | 2nd place, silver medalist(s) |
| Aldo Zúñiga | Men's Individual | 46.77 | 55.57 | 102.34 | 5 Q | 11.99 | 8 |
| Donovan Guevara; Aldo Zúñiga | Men's synchronized | 48.30 | | 48.30 | 1 Q | 34.36 | 5 |
| Verónica Borges | Women's Individual | 18.09 | 19.26 | 37.35 | 12 | Did not advance | |
| Aixa de León | Women's Individual | 42.36 | 35.14 | 77.50 | 10 | Did not advance | |
| Verónica Borges; Aixa de León | Women's synchronized | 44.66 | | 44.66 | 1 Q | 45.05 | 3rd place, bronze medalist(s) |

== Handball ==
=== Men's ===
Summary

| Team | Event | Group play | | | | 5th–8th place classification | 5th-6th Place | |
| Team | Event | Opposition Result | Opposition Result | Opposition Result | Rank | Opposition Result | Opposition Result | Rank |
|---|---|---|---|---|---|---|---|---|
| Mexico | Men's tournament | Brazil; L 27-40 | United States; L 35-39 | Chile; L 21-32 | 4 | Uruguay; W 23(4)-(3)23 | Cuba; W 37-30 | 5 |

=== Women's ===
Summary

| Team | Event | Group play | | | | 5th–8th place classification | 7th-8th place | |
| Team | Event | Opposition Result | Opposition Result | Opposition Result | Rank | Opposition Result | Opposition Result | Rank |
|---|---|---|---|---|---|---|---|---|
| Mexico | Women's tournament | Brazil; L 15 – 43 | Argentina; L 14 – 32 | Cuba; W 34 – 27 | 3 | United States; L 22 – 27 | Cuba; L 25 – 34 | 8 |

== Judo ==
| Athlete | Event | Round of 8 | Quarterfinals | Semifinals | Repechage | Final / BM | |
| Athlete | Event | Opposition Result | Opposition Result | Opposition Result | Opposition Result | Opposition Result | Rank |
|---|---|---|---|---|---|---|---|
| Eduardo Sagastegui | Men's −60 kg | Bye | Hernández (CUB); W 1-0 | Benavides (ECU); L 1-10 | —N/a | Villavicencio (ARG); W 1-0 | 3rd place, bronze medalist(s) |
| Ian Aguirre | Men's −66 kg | Fresneda (CUB); W 10-0 | Johnson (BAH); L 0-10 | —N/a | Vanegas (COL); L 0-1 | Did not advance | =7 |
| Rafael Ramírez | Men's −73 kg | Cordero (CUB); W 11-1 | Hernández (CHI); L 0-11 | —N/a | Silva (URU); W 1-0 | Farnot (USA); W 1-0 | 3rd place, bronze medalist(s) |
| Hugo Sánchez | Men's +100 kg | Bye | Urra (CHI); W 10-0 | Coelho (BRA); L 0-10 | —N/a | Ueyama (USA); L 0-10 | =5 |
| Aylín Ávila | Women's -52kg | Bye | Giménez (PAR); W 10-0 | Rivas (PER); W 10-0 | —N/a | Rodrigues (BRA); L 0-10 | 2nd place, silver medalist(s) |
| Frida Maya | Women's -57kg | Bye | Solis (COL); L 0-1 | —N/a | Cancela (USA); W 10-0 | van Zyl (CAN); L 0-10 | =5 |
| María Cruz | Women's -63kg | Bye | Fuentes (VEN); L 1-10 | —N/a | Bravo (CRC); W 1-0 | Martínez (CUB); W 10-0 | 3rd place, bronze medalist(s) |
| Yamileth Juárez | Women's -70kg | Bye | Santillana (COL); L 0-10 | —N/a | Thibault (CAN); L 0-10 | Did not advance | =7 |
| Paula Sánchez | Women's -78kg | Bye | Murillo (COL); L 0-10 | —N/a | Matos (DOM); L 0-10 | Did not advance | =7 |
| Bárbara Padilla | Women's +78kg | Bye | Casas (CHI); L DNS | —N/a | Soares (BRA); L DNS | Did not advance | —N/a |
| Ian Aguirre; María Cruz; Yamileth Juárez; Rafael Ramírez; Hugo Sánchez; Paula Sánchez; Eduardo Sagastegui | Mixed Team | United States; L 0-4 | Did not advance | | | | 9 |

== Karate ==
| Team | Event | Group play | | | | Semifinal | Final / BM | |
| Team | Event | Opposition Result | Opposition Result | Opposition Result | Rank | Opposition Result | Opposition Result | Rank |
|---|---|---|---|---|---|---|---|---|
| Fabbio Ponce | Men's -60kg | Florentín (PAR); W Points 3-0 | Gallardo (ARG); L Points 1-2 | Chirinos (VEN); L Points 2-7 | 3 | Did not advance | | =5 |
| Hayato Yoshii | Men's -75kg | Feliz (DOM); W Points 1-0 | Rinck (PAR); W Points 8-0 | Salesky (ARG); L Points 2-4 | 2 | Castro (VEN); L Points 2-4 | Did not advance | 3rd place, bronze medalist(s) |
| Jesús García | Men's -84kg | Frisanco (BRA); L Points 1-9 | Taneski (USA); L Points 0-5 | —N/a | 3 | Did not advance | | =5 |
| Alberto Velasco | Men's +84kg | Sánchez (VEN); W Points 4-3 | White (USA); W Points 6-4 | Nogueira (BRA); L Senshu 3-3 | 3 | Did not advance | | =5 |
| Emilia Salinas | Women's -50kg | Ospina (COL); W Points 9-7 | Tinoco (NCA); L Points 1-5 | Sánchez (PER); L Points 2-5 | 4 | Did not advance | | =5 |
| Ana Herrera | Women's -61kg | Pacheco (ARG); L Points 2-7 | Tirado (VEN); W Points 7-3 | Mojica (PUR); W Points 6-1 | 1 | Gómez (COL); W Points 9-7 | Cimarro (BRA); W Points 6-1 | 1st place, gold medalist(s) |
| Ana Muñoz | Women's -68kg | Juncosa (VEN); L Points 4-8 | Hernández (CHI); W Points 3-1 | López (ECU); W Points 4-1 | 2 | Hernández (PUR); L Points 1-9 | Did not advance | 3rd place, bronze medalist(s) |

== Roller Sports ==
=== Artistic Skating ===
| Athlete | Event | Short Program | | Long Program | | Total | |
| Athlete | Event | Points | Rank | Points | Rank | Points | Final Rank |
|---|---|---|---|---|---|---|---|
| Bruno Núñez | Men's Free | 29.03 | 8 | 52.82 | 6 | 81.85 | 7 |
| Valentina Lomas | Women's Free | 54.99 | 2 | 62.07 | 6 | 117.06 | 5 |

| Athlete | Event | Style Dance | | Free Dance | | Total | |
| Athlete | Event | Points | Rank | Points | Rank | Points | Final Rank |
|---|---|---|---|---|---|---|---|
| Joanna Ibarra | Women's Solo Dance | 33.28 | 8 | 43.62 | 8 | 76.90 | 8 |

=== Skateboarding ===
| Athlete | Event | Semifinal | | Final | |
| Athlete | Event | Result | Rank | Result | Rank |
|---|---|---|---|---|---|
| Luiz Muñiz | Men's Street | 103.33 | 9 | Did not advance | |
| Tenoch Mondragón | Men's Street | 89.91 | 13 | Did not advance | |
| María José Cabrera | Women's Street | 59.04 | 9 | Did not advance | |
| Itzel Farías | Women's Street | 23.16 | 14 | Did not advance | |

=== Speed Skating ===
| Athlete | Event | Preliminaries | | Semifinals | | Final | |
| Athlete | Event | Result | Rank | Result | Rank | Result | Rank |
|---|---|---|---|---|---|---|---|
| Josué Cantú | Men's 200m Time Trial | —N/a | | | | 18.362 | 7 |
| Josué Cantú | Men's 500m + Distance | 44.305 | 8 Q | 44.981 | 6 FB | 45.742 | 7 |
| Josué Cantú | Men's 1,000m Sprint | 1:26.438 | 6 q | —N/a | | 1:30.802 | 7 |
| Alejandro Castañeda | Men's 5,000m Points | —N/a | | | | 0 | 8 |
| Alejandro Castañeda | Men's 10,000m Elimination | —N/a | | | | E | 5 |
| Naim Bucio | Women's 200m Time Trial | —N/a | | | | 19.477 | 5 |
| Naim Bucio | Women's 500m + Distance | 47.756 | 9 | Did not advance | | | 9 |
| Naim Bucio | Women's 1,000m Sprint | 1:33.175 | 6 q | —N/a | | 1:38.249 | 8 |
| Brianda Carmona | Women's 5,000m Points | —N/a | | | | DNF | |
| Brianda Carmona | Women's 10,000m Elimination | —N/a | | | | E | 8 |

Ranks given are overall position after all preliminary heats; Q = Qualified for the next round as part of the Top 8; q = Qualified for the next round as one of the fastest non-heat winners; FB = Qualified for Final B.

== Rowing ==
| Athlete | Event | Qualification | | Repechage | | Final | |
| Athlete | Event | Result | Rank | Result | Rank | Result | Rank |
|---|---|---|---|---|---|---|---|
| Nicolás Luna | M1X | 7:34.95 | 7 Re | 7:30.41 | 4 FB | 7:27.08 | 8 |
| José Navarro; Roberto Ahumada | M2X | 7:14.84 | 5 Re | 6:48.03 | 3 FA | 6:34.71 | 3rd place, bronze medalist(s) |
| José García; Erick Muñoz | M2- | —N/a | | | | 6:59.03 | 5 |
| Ximena Castellanos | W1X | 8:33.90 | 5 FA | Bye | | 8:10.73 | 4 |

FA=Final A (medal); FB=Final B (non-medal); Re=Repechage

== Rugby Sevens ==
=== Men's ===
Summary

| Team | Event | Group play | | | | 5th–8th place classification | | Rank |
| Team | Event | Opposition Result | Opposition Result | Opposition Result | Rank | Opposition Result | Opposition Result | Rank |
|---|---|---|---|---|---|---|---|---|
| Mexico | Men's tournament | Uruguay; L 7-41 | Chile; L 0-36 | Jamaica; W 21-12 | 3 | Bermuda; W 12-10 | Jamaica; L 12-15 | 6 |

=== Women's ===
Summary

| Team | Event | Group play | | | | 5th–8th place classification | | Rank |
| Team | Event | Opposition Result | Opposition Result | Opposition Result | Rank | Opposition Result | Opposition Result | Rank |
|---|---|---|---|---|---|---|---|---|
| Mexico | Women's tournament | Brazil; L 0-46 | United States; L 0-39 | Paraguay; W 27-0 | 3 | Jamaica; W 10-5 | Colombia; L 0-30 | 6 |

== Sailing ==
| Athlete | Event | Races | | | | | Total Points | Net Points | Rank |
| Athlete | Event | 1 | 2 | 3 | 4 | 5 | Total Points | Net Points | Rank |
|---|---|---|---|---|---|---|---|---|---|
| Jerónimo Abogado | Men's iQFoil | 4 | ~~6~~; ~~[STP]~~ | 5 | 5 | 6 | 26 | 20 | 5 |
| Alec Vázquez | Men's Kite | 2 | ~~4~~ | 3 | 2 | —N/a | 11 | 7 | 2nd place, silver medalist(s) |
| Sofía del Paso | Women's ILCA6 | 16 | 17 | 17 | ~~18~~ | 16 [STP] | 85 | 67 | 17 |

STP= Standard Penalty. Highest race scores get deleted.

== Shooting ==
Men

| Athlete | Event | Qualification | | Final | |
| Athlete | Event | Points | Rank | Points | Rank |
|---|---|---|---|---|---|
| Erick Ruiz | 10m air pistol | 555-9x | 7 Q | 153.3 | 6 |
| Pedro Quintero | 10m air pistol | 553-10x | 8 Q | 112.2 | 8 |
| Josué Rodríguez | 10m air rifle | 614.8 | 6 Q | 153.3 | 6 |
| José Manuel Alvarado | 10m air rifle | 612.6 | 9 | Did not advance | 9 |

Women

| Athlete | Event | Qualification | | Final | |
| Athlete | Event | Points | Rank | Points | Rank |
|---|---|---|---|---|---|
| Mía Rosales | 10m air pistol | 561-14x | 3 Q | 131.6 | 7 |
| Sofía Ibarra | 10m air pistol | 516-16x | 2 Q | 237.0 | 2nd place, silver medalist(s) |
| Hanna Cisneros | 10m air rifle | 619.1 | 4 Q | 183.1 | 5 |
| Luisa Márquez | 10m air rifle | 616.4 | 8 Q | 163.2 | 6 |
| Andrea Saavedra | Skeet | 73 | 6 Q | 19 | 4 |
| Daniela Nava | Skeet | 57 | 8 | Did not advance | 8 |
| Andrea Saavedra | Trap | 67 | 7 | Did not advance | 7 |
| Daniela Nava | Trap | DNS | | Did not advance | |

Mixed

| Athlete | Event | Qualification | | Final | |
| Athlete | Event | Points | Rank | Points | Rank |
|---|---|---|---|---|---|
| Mía Rosales; Pedro Quintero | 10m air pistol | 562.0 | 3 QB | Brazil; L 15-17 | 4 |
| Sofía Ibarra; Erick Ruiz | 10m air pistol | 563.0 | 2 QG | United States; L 6-16 | 2nd place, silver medalist(s) |
| José Manuel Alvarado; Luisa Márquez | 10m air rifle | 609.4 | 9 | Did not advance | 9 |
| Hanna Cisneros; Josué Rodríguez | 10m air rifle | 622.0 | 2 QG | United States; L 7-17 | 2nd place, silver medalist(s) |

QG=Qualified for Gold; QB=Qualified for Bronze

== Squash ==
| Athlete | Event | Round of 32 | Round of 16 | Quarterfinals | Semifinals | Final / BM | Rank |
| Athlete | Event | Opposition Score | Opposition Score | Opposition Score | Opposition Score | Opposition Score | Rank |
|---|---|---|---|---|---|---|---|
| Gilberto Aceves | Men's Individual | Rivera (ESA); W 3-0; 11–2, 11–2, 11-7 | Irisarri (COL); L 1-3; 7-11, 11-7, 8-11, 7-11 | Did not advance | | | =16 |
| Santiago Medina | Men's Individual | Bye | Castillo (PER); W 3-2; 11-7, 11-13, 11-9, 7-11, 11-7 | Romo (ECU); L 1-3; 11-6, 8-11, 9-11, 7-11 | Did not advance | | =5 |
| Gilberto Aceves; Santiago Medina | Men's Doubles | —N/a | | Guatemala; W 2-0; 11-5, 11-7 | Colombia; L 1-2; 10-11, 11-10, 4-11 | —N/a | 3rd place, bronze medalist(s) |
| Gilberto Aceves; Santiago Medina; Wally Ávila | Men's Team | —N/a | Bye | Brazil; W 2-1 | Colombia; L 0-2 | —N/a | 3rd place, bronze medalist(s) |
| Ana Botello | Women's Individual | Needham (CHI); W 3-0; 11–3, 11–7, 11-5 | Falconí (ECU); L 1-3; 11-8, 3-11, 7-11, 10-12 | Did not advance | | | =16 |
| Mariana Narvaez | Women's Individual | Bye | Sabogal (COL); W 3-0; 11-3, 14-12, 11-6 | Rivero (ARG); W 3-2; 11-6, 11-2, 7-11, 6-11, 11-8 | Gatti (PAR); L 1-3; 10-12, 11-9, 2-11, 8-11 | —N/a | 3rd place, bronze medalist(s) |
| Ana Botello; Paola Franco | Women's Doubles | —N/a | | Brazil; W 2-0; 11-2, 11-4 | Ecuador; W 2-1; 7-11, 11-5, 11-9 | Guatemala; L 1-2; 11-10, 8-11, 10-11 | 2nd place, silver medalist(s) |
| Ana Botello; Paola Franco; Mariana Narvaez | Women's Team | —N/a | Bye | Guatemala; W 2-0 | Colombia; W 2-0 | Ecuador; W 2-0 | 1st place, gold medalist(s) |
| Wally Ávila; Mariana Narvaez | Mixed Doubles | —N/a | Bye | Brazil; W 2-0; 11-8, 11-3 | Argentina; W 2-0; 11-5, 11-10 | Peru; W 2-0; 11-4, 11-7 | 1st place, gold medalist(s) |

== Swimming ==
Key

- Ranks given are overall position after all heats
- Q = Qualified for Final A
- q = Qualified for Final B
- JPR = Junior Pan American Record
- DSQ = Disqualified
- DNS = Did not start

Men

| Athlete | Event | Heats | | Final | |
| Athlete | Event | Time | Rank | Time | Rank |
|---|---|---|---|---|---|
| Rafael Arizpe | 200m backstroke | 2:03.99 | 5 Q | 2:03.01 | 5 |
| Rafael Arizpe | 200m butterfly | 2:02.36 | 6 Q | 2:01.15 | 5 |
| Rafael Arizpe | 400m individual medley | 4:29.72 | 5 Q | 4:25.96 | 5 |
| Diego Camacho | 100m backstroke | 56.49 | 5 Q | 56.75 | 7 |
| José Alberto Cano | 200m freestyle | 1:52.81 | 11 q | 1:52.56 | 11 |
| Andrés Dupont | 50m freestyle | DNS | | —N/a | |
| Andrés Dupont | 100m freestyle | 49.94 | =3 Q | 48.14 | 2nd place, silver medalist(s) |
| Andrés Dupont | 100m butterfly | 54.20 | =5 Q | 53.10 | 4 |
| Santiago Gutiérrez | 400m freestyle | 4:01.06 | 6 Q | 3:59.14 | 6 |
| Santiago Gutiérrez | 800m freestyle | —N/a | | 8:14.72 | 4 |
| Santiago Gutiérrez | 1500m freestyle | —N/a | | 15:45.58 | 3rd place, bronze medalist(s) |
| David Medina | 100m freestyle | 51.69 | 19 | Did not advance | 19 |
| David Medina | 200m freestyle | 1:51.39 | 5 Q | 1:50.36 | 5 |
| Humberto Nájera | 100m backstroke | 55.41 | 2 Q | 55.56 | 4 |
| Humberto Nájera | 200m backstroke | 2:02.74 | 1 Q | 1:57.44 JPR | 1st place, gold medalist(s) |
| Humberto Nájera | 200m individual medley | DSQ | | —N/a | |
| Nicolás Sobenes | 100m butterfly | 54.71 | 12 q | 54.00 | 10 |
| Nicolás Sobenes | 200m butterfly | 2:06.69 | 13 q | Withdrew | |
| Paulo Strehlke | 400m freestyle | 3:57.82 | 4 Q | 3:53.05 | 4 |
| Paulo Strehlke | 800m freestyle | —N/a | | 8:02.87 | 3rd place, bronze medalist(s) |
| Paulo Strehlke | 1500m freestyle | Withdrew | | —N/a | |
| Maximiliano Vega | 100m breaststroke | 1:04.17 | 14 q | 1:04.42 | 14 |
| Maximiliano Vega | 200m breaststroke | 2:18.07 | 7 Q | Withdrew | |
| Maximiliano Vega | 200m individual medley | 2:04.83 | 5 Q | 2:03.49 | 5 |
| Maximiliano Vega | 400m individual medley | 4:27.93 | 3 Q | 4:22.24 | 3rd place, bronze medalist(s) |
| Alfredo Velázquez | 50m freestyle | 22.97 | =7 Q | 22.91 | 7 |
| Diego Camacho; José Alberto Cano; Andrés Dupont; David Medina; Maximiliano Vega; Alfredo Velázquez | 4x100m freestyle relay | 3:23.96 | 2 Q | 3:21.32 | 4 |
| José Alberto Cano; Andrés Dupont; David Medina; Paulo Strehlke | 4x200m freestyle relay | —N/a | | 7:22.12 | 2nd place, silver medalist(s) |
| Rafael Arizpe; Diego Camacho; Andrés Dupont; Humberto Nájera; Marco Pat; Nicolás Sobenes; Alfredo Velázquez | 4x100m medley relay | 3:46.92 | 5 Q | 3:40.50 | 3rd place, bronze medalist(s) |

Women

| Athlete | Event | Heats | | Final | |
| Athlete | Event | Time | Rank | Time | Rank |
|---|---|---|---|---|---|
| Paulina Alanís | 200m butterfly | 2:20.04 | 8 Q | 2:20.10 | 8 |
| Isabella Chávez | 200m butterfly | 2:19.13 | 7 Q | 2:19.57 | 7 |
| Isabella Chávez | 200m individual medley | 2:22.08 | 7 Q | 2:18.53 | 3rd place, bronze medalist(s) |
| Isabella Chávez | 400m individual medley | 5:07.20 | 11 q | 5:00.46 | 9 |
| Fernanda Elizondo | 200m freestyle | 2:05.18 | 5 Q | 2:04.61 | 6 |
| Fernanda Elizondo | 400m freestyle | 4:21.46 | 7 Q | 4:20.35 | 6 |
| Andrea González | 200m freestyle | 2:08.03 | 14 q | 2:08.10 | 15 |
| Sharon Guerrero | 400m freestyle | 4:20.28 | 6 Q | 4:21.50 | 7 |
| Sharon Guerrero | 800m freestyle | —N/a | | 8:49.46 | 3rd place, bronze medalist(s) |
| Sharon Guerrero | 1500m freestyle | —N/a | | 16:50.14 | 4 |
| María Méndez | 50m freestyle | 26.79 | 9 q | 26.67 | 10 |
| María Méndez | 100m freestyle | 58.44 | 13 q | Withdrew | |
| María Méndez | 100m butterfly | 1:01.44 | 4 Q | 1:00.73 | 3rd place, bronze medalist(s) |
| Mariana Ortega | 100m breaststroke | 1:13.09 | 9 q | 1:12.07 | 9 |
| Mariana Ortega | 200m breaststroke | 2:38.99 | 5 Q | 2:36.72 | 6 |
| Celia Pulido | 100m freestyle | 57.71 | 8 Q | Withdrew | |
| Celia Pulido | 100m backstroke | 1:02.90 | 1 Q | 1:00.82 JPR | 1st place, gold medalist(s) |
| Celia Pulido | 200m backstroke | 2:13.10 JPR | 1 Q | 2:11.67 | 2nd place, silver medalist(s) |
| Yuritzi Salgado | 800m freestyle | —N/a | | 8:59.33 | 5 |
| Yuritzi Salgado | 1500m freestyle | —N/a | | 16.57.20 | 5 |
| María José Sánchez | 100m breaststroke | 1:13.60 | 12 q | 1:12.69 | =11 |
| María José Sánchez | 200m breaststroke | 2:44.45 | 10 q | 2:40.23 | 10 |
| María Santolaya | 200m individual medley | 2:28.94 | 15 q | 2:30.27 | 15 |
| María Santolaya | 400m individual medley | 5:02.59 | 6 Q | 5:01.77 | 7 |
| Hadassah Tompkins | 50m freestyle | 27.63 | 23 | Did not advance | 23 |
| Fernanda Elizondo; María Méndez; Celia Pulido; Valeria Villarreal | 4x100m freestyle relay | 3:50.32 | 1 Q | 3:47.77 | 2nd place, silver medalist(s) |
| Fernanda Elizondo; Andrea González; Sharon Guerrero; Celia Pulido; Yuritzi Salgado; María Santolaya; Valeria Villarreal | 4x200m freestyle relay | 8:33.99 | 5 Q | 8:23.04 | 4 |
| Fernanda Elizondo; María Méndez; Mariana Ortega; Celia Pulido | 4x100m medley relay | —N/a | | 4:12.48 | 3rd place, bronze medalist(s) |

Mixed

| Athlete | Event | Heats | | Final | |
| Athlete | Event | Time | Rank | Time | Rank |
|---|---|---|---|---|---|
| Diego Camacho; José Alberto Cano; Andrés Dupont; Andrea González; David Medina; María Méndez; Celia Pulido; Alfredo Velázquez; Valeria Villarreal | Mixed 4x100m freestyle relay | 3:39.66 | 5 Q | 3:32.49 | 3rd place, bronze medalist(s) |
| Diego Camacho; Andrés Dupont; Fernanda Elizondo; María Méndez; Humberto Nájera; Marco Pat; Celia Pulido; Valeria Villarreal | Mixed 4x100m medley relay | 3:59.60 | 2 Q | DSQ | |

Open Water Swimming

| Athlete | Event | Final | |
| Athlete | Event | Result | Rank |
|---|---|---|---|
| Alan González | Men's 10km | 1:58:37.8 | 9 |
| Paulo Strehlke | Men's 10km | 1:50:01.5 | 1st place, gold medalist(s) |
| Paulina Alanís | Women's 10km | 2:01:32.1 | 3rd place, bronze medalist(s) |
| Sharon Guerrero | Women's 10km | 2:01:41.7 | 5 |

== Table Tennis ==
Singles and Doubles

| Athlete | Event | Round of 32 | Round of 16 | Quarterfinal | Semifinal | Final / BM | |
| Athlete | Event | Opposition Score | Opposition Score | Opposition Score | Opposition Score | Opposition Score | Rank |
|---|---|---|---|---|---|---|---|
| Jorge Buenrostro | Men's singles | Jutras (CAN); W 4-0; 11-8, 12-10, 13-11, 11-6 | Iizuka (BRA); L 1-4; 11-9, 3-11, 6-11, 8-11, 7-11 | Did not advance | | | =9 |
| Eli Martín | Men's singles | Pastore (PAR); L1-4; 5-11, 5-11, 8-11, 11-9, 7-11 | Did not advance | | | | =17 |
| Jorge Buenrostro; Eli Martín | Men's doubles | —N/a | Colombia; W 3-2; 11-9, 4-11, 11-4, 9-11, 11-7 | Canada; L 0-3; 8-11, 7-11, 7-11 | Did not advance | | =5 |
| María Aguilar | Women's singles | Anchundia (ECU); W 4-3; 8-11, 8-11, 11-9, 11-5, 6-11, 11-2, 11-6 | Ferrer (VEN); L 1-4; 7-11, 7-11, 4-11, 11-7, 5-11 | Did not advance | | | =9 |
| Ximena Figueroa | Women's singles | Aspathi (USA); L 0-4; 4-11, 9-11, 4-11, 2-11 | Did not advance | | | | =17 |
| María Aguilar; Ximena Figueroa | Women's doubles | —N/a | United States; L 2-3; 11-4, 5-11, 11-9, 6-11, 7-11 | Did not advance | | | =9 |
| Jorge Buenrostro; Ximena Figueroa | Mixed doubles | Ecuador; W 3-0; 16-14, 11-7, 11-3 | Brazil; L 0-3; 6-11, 7-11, 9-11 | Did not advance | | | =9 |
| Eli Martín; María Aguilar | Mixed doubles | Ecuador; L 0-3; 7-11, 8-11, 11-13 | Did not advance | | | | =17 |

Team

| Athlete | Event | Pool Play | | | | Quarterfinal | Semifinal | Final / BM | |
| Athlete | Event | Opposition Score | Opposition Score | Opposition Score | Group Rank | Opposition Score | Opposition Score | Opposition Score | Rank |
|---|---|---|---|---|---|---|---|---|---|
| Jorge Buenrostro; Eli Martín | Men's Team | Ecuador; W 3-1 | Cuba; L 1-3 | United States; L 0-3 | 3 | Did not advance | | | =9 |
| María Aguilar; Ximena Figueroa | Women's Team | Ecuador; L 2-3 | Trinidad and Tobago; L 1-3 | Colombia; L 0-3 | 4 | Did not advance | | | =9 |

== Taekwondo ==
=== Kyorugi ===
| Athlete | Event | Quarterfinal | Semifinal | Final / BM | |
| Athlete | Event | Opposition Score | Opposition Score | Opposition Score | Rank |
|---|---|---|---|---|---|
| Carlos Cortés | Men's -58kg | Ramírez (ECU); W Walkover | Goncalves (BRA); L 1-2 | Contreras (CHI); W 2-0 | 3rd place, bronze medalist(s) |
| Leonardo Gómez | Men's -68kg | dos Santos (BRA); L 0-2 | Did not advance | | =7 |
| Víctor Ramírez | Men's +80kg | Nieves (PUR); W 2-0 | Goicochea (CUB); L 0-2 | Feliz (DOM); W 1-0 | 3rd place, bronze medalist(s) |
| Andrea Zambrano | Women's -49kg | Way (GUA); W 2-0 | Mata (USA); W 2-1 | Grippoli (URU); W 2-0 | 1st place, gold medalist(s) |
| Zaira Salgado | Women's -57kg | Bye | Arenas (PER); W 2-0 | Miller (USA); W 2-0 | 1st place, gold medalist(s) |
| Julia Ramírez | Women's -67kg | Daza (BOL); W 2-0 | Beaulieu (CAN); L 1-0 | León (CUB); L 1-2 | =5 |
| Paloma García | Women's +67kg | Pelayo (USA); W 2-0 | Paz (COL); W 2-1 | Lee (HAI); L 1-2 | 2nd place, silver medalist(s) |
| Carlos Cortés; Paloma García; Leonardo Gómez; Julia Ramírez; Víctor Ramírez; Zaira Salgado | Mixed Team | Puerto Rico; W 2-0 | Brazil; L 0-2 | —N/a | 3rd place, bronze medalist(s) |

=== Poomsae ===
| Athlete | Event | Round of 16 | Quarterfinal | Semifinal | Final / BM | |
| Athlete | Event | Opposition Score | Opposition Score | Opposition Score | Opposition Score | Rank |
|---|---|---|---|---|---|---|
| Obed Martínez | Men's Traditional Individual | Bye | Sangoquiza (ECU); W 8.63-8.23 | Argomedo (PER); W 8.77-8.63 | Gun (USA); L 8.74-9.08 | 2nd place, silver medalist(s) |
| Brisa Alekc | Women's Traditional Individual | Bye | Icuté (GUA); W 8.94-8.66 | Varillas (PER); W 8.94-8.93 | Reclusado (USA); L 8.91-9.13 | 2nd place, silver medalist(s) |
| Brisa Alekc; Obed Martínez | Mixed Poomsae Freestyle Pairs | —N/a | | | 8.240 | 3rd place, bronze medalist(s) |

== Tennis ==
| Athlete | Event | Round of 64 | Round of 32 | Round of 16 | Quarterfinal | Semifinal | Final / BM | |
| Athlete | Event | Opposition Score | Opposition Score | Opposition Score | Opposition Score | Opposition Score | Opposition Score | Rank |
|---|---|---|---|---|---|---|---|---|
| Diego Alcalá | Men's Singles | Bye | Castellanos (COL); L 4-6, 3-6 | Did not advance | | | | =17 |
| Luis Andrés Flores | Men's Singles | Bye | Didoni (BRA); L 4-6, 1-6 | Did not advance | | | | =17 |
| Mauricio Schtulmann | Men's Singles | Bye | Álvarez (PUR); L 0-6, 2-6 | Did not advance | | | | =17 |
| Luis Andrés Flores; Mauricio Schtulmann | Men's Doubles | —N/a | | Colombia; W 5-7, 6-3, 10-5 | Paraguay; W 6-3, 6-2 | Argentina; L 2-6, 1-6 | Brazil; L 6-7, 3-6 | 4 |
| Marianne Ángel | Women's Singles | Bye | Gallegos (CRC); W 6-0, 6-3 | Vázquez (ARG); L 3-6, 3-6 | Did not advance | | | =9 |
| Hanne Estrada | Women's Singles | Bye | Mediorreal (COL); L 3-6, 1-6 | Did not advance | | | | =17 |
| Abril Cárdenas | Women's Singles | Bye | Vargas (ECU); L 3-6, 7-6, 4-6 | Did not advance | | | | =17 |
| Marianne Ángel; Hanne Estrada | Women's Doubles | —N/a | | | Bolivia; W 5-7, 6-2, 10-7 | Colombia; W 6-2, 6-3 | Argentina; L 6-0, 2-6, 6-10 | 2nd place, silver medalist(s) |
| Diego Alcalá; Abril Cárdenas | Mixed Doubles | —N/a | | Uruguay; W 6-1, 6-4 | Colombia; L 5-7, 3-6 | Did not advance | | =5 |

== Triathlon ==
Individual

| Athlete | Event | Swim | T1 | Bike | T2 | Run | Total Time | Final rank |
|---|---|---|---|---|---|---|---|---|
| Alfredo Rodríguez | Men's | 10:45 | 0:48 | 28:00 | 0:20 | 15:54 | 55:47 | 10 |
| Osvaldo Zúñiga | Men's | 10:47 | 0:42 | 28:03 | 0:19 | 15:19 | 55:10 | 7 |
| María López | Women's | 13:16 | 0:44 | 29:43 | 0:19 | 16:40 | 1:00:45 | 4 |
| Regina Michel | Women's | 12:24 | 0:47 | 30:31 | 0:18 | 17:34 | 1:01:34 | 6 |

Mixed Relay

| Athlete | Event | Time | | | | | | Rank |
| Athlete | Event | Swim | T1 | Bike | T2 | Run | Total | Rank |
|---|---|---|---|---|---|---|---|---|
| Regina Michel | Mixed Relay | 5:44 | 0:45 | 9:16 | 0:17 | 5:14 | 21:16 | —N/a |
| Alfredo Rodríguez | Mixed Relay | 5:48 | 0:44 | 8:33 | 0:21 | 4:52 | 20:18 | —N/a |
| María López | Mixed Relay | 7:07 | 0:46 | 9:09 | 0:20 | 5:09 | 22:31 | —N/a |
| Osvaldo Zúñiga | Mixed Relay | 5:08 | 0:42 | 9:09 | 0:22 | 5:15 | 20:36 | —N/a |
| Total | Mixed Relay | —N/a | | | | | 1:24:41 | 3rd place, bronze medalist(s) |

== Volleyball ==
Mexico qualified the men's team after reaching the semifinals of the 2024 Copa Panamericana U23 in Paramaribo, Suriname in September 2024. The women's team qualified after finishing in 2nd place at the 2023 Women's U23 Pan-American Volleyball Cup in Hermosillo, Mexico.

=== Men's ===
| Team | Event | Group play | | | | Quarterfinal | Semifinal | Final / BM | |
| Team | Event | Opposition Result | Opposition Result | Opposition Result | Rank | Opposition Result | Opposition Result | Opposition Result | Rank |
|---|---|---|---|---|---|---|---|---|---|
| Mexico | Men's Tournament | Colombia; W 3-1; 18-25, 25-18, 25-23, 26-24 | Guatemala; W 3-0; 25-11, 25-17, 25-23 | Paraguay; W 3-0; 25-19, 25-17, 25-17 | 1 | Bye | Argentina; L 0-3; 21-25, 19-25, 23-25 | Cuba; L 1-3; 25-22, 13-25, 18-25, 23-25 | 4 |

=== Women's ===
| Team | Event | Group play | | | | Quarterfinal | Semifinal | Final | |
| Team | Event | Opposition Result | Opposition Result | Opposition Result | Group Rank | Opposition Result | Opposition Result | Opposition Result | Rank |
|---|---|---|---|---|---|---|---|---|---|
| Mexico | Women's Tournament | Brazil; L 1-3; 18-25, 25-21, 15-25, 15-25 | Dominican Republic; W 3-1; 25-20, 20-25, 25-22, 25-16 | Chile; W 3-0; 25-23, 25-16, 25-17 | 2 | Costa Rica; W 3-0; 25-17, 25-18, 25-19 | Argentina; W 3-0; 25-20, 25-12, 25-16 | Brazil; L 0-3; 23-25, 19-25, 14-25 | 2nd place, silver medalist(s) |

== Water Skiing and Wakeboard ==
| Athlete | Event | Preliminaries | | Repechage | | Final | |
| Athlete | Event | Result | Rank | Result | Rank | Result | Rank |
|---|---|---|---|---|---|---|---|
| Pablo Font | Men's Slalom | 3.00 / 58 / 18.25 | 18 | —N/a | | Did not advance | 18 |
| Pablo Font | Men's Figures | 10390 | 3 Q | —N/a | | 10390 | 3rd place, bronze medalist(s) |
| Jaime Palomino | Men's Slalom | 2.50 / 58 / 10.75 | 4 Q | —N/a | | 1.50 / 58 / 10.75 | 3rd place, bronze medalist(s) |
| Jaime Palomino | Men's Figures | 960 | 14 | —N/a | | Did not advance | 14 |
| Diego Monsalve | Men's Wakeboard | 81.11 | 1 Q | Bye | | 85.67 | 1st place, gold medalist(s) |
| Fernanda Larios | Women's Wakeboard | 68.33 | 2 Q | Bye | | 71.67 | 2nd place, silver medalist(s) |

== Weightlifting ==
| Athlete | Event | Snatch | | Clean & Jerk | | Total | |
| Athlete | Event | Result | Rank | Result | Rank | Result | Rank |
|---|---|---|---|---|---|---|---|
| Leonardo Torres | Men's 71kg | 124 | 2 | 150 | 3 | 274 | 2nd place, silver medalist(s) |
| Ángel Castellano | Men's 88kg | 143 | 4 | 177 | 5 | 320 | 5 |
| Jorge A. Posada | Men's +98kg | 150 | 4 | 191 | 3 | 391 | 4 |
| María José Hernández | Women's 58kg | 84 | 2 | 105 | 3 | 189 | 2nd place, silver medalist(s) |
| Camila Cervantes | Women's 77kg | 96 | =3 | 123 | 3 | 219 | 3rd place, bronze medalist(s) |
| Mairyn Hernández | Women's +77kg | 106 | 2 | 130 | 2 | 236 | 2nd place, silver medalist(s) |

== Wrestling ==
Key:

- VT – Victory by fall.
- VB – Victory by injury (VF for forfeit, VA for withdrawal or disqualification)
- PP – Decision by points – the loser with technical points.
- PO – Decision by points – the loser without technical points.
- ST – Great superiority – the loser without technical points and a margin of victory of at least 8 (Greco-Roman) or 10 (freestyle) points.
- SP – Technical superiority – the loser with technical points and a margin of victory of at least 8 (Greco-Roman) or 10 (freestyle) points.

| Athlete | Event | Quarterfinal | Semifinal | Final / BM | |
| Athlete | Event | Opposition Score | Opposition Score | Opposition Score | Rank |
|---|---|---|---|---|---|
| Diego Peraza | Men's Freestyle -65kg | Bassett (USA); L SP 4-14 | Did not advance | Martínez (CUB); W PP 15-11 | 3rd place, bronze medalist(s) |
| Rizieri Chávez | Men's Freestyle -125kg | Pérez (DOM); L PP 4-6 | Did not advance | | =7 |
| Ángel Segura | Men's Greco-Roman -60kg | Carvajal (DOM); W PP 3-1 | Sánchez (PER); W ST 11-0 | Black (USA); L ST 0-9 | 2nd place, silver medalist(s) |
| Diego Macías | Men's Greco-Roman -87kg | Ferreira (BRA); W PP 5-1 | Brown (PAN); W SP 11-2 | Jacobson (USA); L ST 0-9 | 2nd place, silver medalist(s) |
| Dorian Trejo | Men's Greco-Roman -97kg | Wyatt (USA); W PP 4-3 | González (CUB); W PP 4-1 | Díaz (VEN); L PP 3-5 | 2nd place, silver medalist(s) |
| Ana Sofía Palacios | Women's Freestyle -50kg | León (ECU); W PP 9-8 | Sales (BRA); L PP 1-6 | Casusol (PER); W PP 5-2 | 3rd place, bronze medalist(s) |
| Bertha Rojas | Women's Freestyle -57kg | Torres (VEN); W VT 12-1 | Friesen (CAN); W PP 4-1 | Sanz (CUB); L PP 2-4 | 2nd place, silver medalist(s) |
| Melanie Jiménez | Women's Freestyle -62kg | Montero (VEN); L VF | Did not advance | Cosme (USA); L VF | =5 |
| Debanhi Tapia | Women's Freestyle -68kg | Hays (USA); L PP 1-7 | Did not advance | Hernández (PUR); W PP 4-2 | 3rd place, bronze medalist(s) |
| Edna Jiménez | Women's Freestyle -76kg | Prado (BRA); W SP 13-2 | Kelly (USA); L ST 0-10 | Sánchez (CHI); W VT 10-0 | 3rd place, bronze medalist(s) |

| Team | Event | Pool play | | | | Semifinal | Final / BM | |
| Team | Event | Opposition Result | Opposition Result | Opposition Result | Rank | Opposition Result | Opposition Result | Rank |
|---|---|---|---|---|---|---|---|---|
| Juan Iturriza | Men's Freestyle -97kg | Ortiz (PUR); W SP 16-5 | Villareal (VEN); W VT 4-0 | Lee (CUB); L PP 2-6 | 2 | Dineen (USA); L ST 0-10 | Andrés (DOM); W SP 15-2 | 3rd place, bronze medalist(s) |
| Juan Herrera | Men's Greco-Roman -130kg | Araya (CHI); W SP 11-2 | Barros (BRA); L VT 5-12 | Attao (USA); L VB 0-0 | 3 | Did not advance | | =5 |

Note: These categories were contested in a pool play format due to the odd number of competitors.

== See also ==
- 2026 Central American and Caribbean Games
- Mexico at the 2027 Pan American Games
