= Wrestling at the 2025 Junior Pan American Games =

Wrestling at the 2025 Junior American Games
- Venue: Olympic Training Centre
- Start date: August 20, 2025
- End date: August 22, 2025
- No. of events: 18
- Competitors: 144

The wrestling events at the 2025 Junior Pan American Games were held at the Olympic Training Centre, located in the Olympic Park in Luque, in the Greater Asuncion area. The events were contested between August 20 and 22, 2025.

Eighteen events were contested, twelve for men (6 greco-roman and 6 freestyle) and six for women (freestyle). The winner of each event qualified for the 2027 Pan American Games in Lima, Peru.

== Qualification ==
A total of 144 athletes qualified for the events. Qualification was based on the results from the 2025 Pan American U23 Championship, held in Querétaro, Mexico.

== Medal summary ==
=== Medal table ===
* Host nation (Paraguay)

Rank	Nation	Gold	Silver	Bronze	Total
1	United States	10	2	4	16
2	Venezuela	4	2	3	9
3	Cuba	3	5	3	11
4	Ecuador	1	0	0	1
5	Mexico	0	4	5	9
6	Brazil	0	2	3	5
6	Puerto Rico	0	2	3	5
8	Colombia	0	1	4	5
9	Argentina	0	0	3	3
10	Dominican Republic	0	0	2	2
11	Canada	0	0	1	1
11	Guatemala	0	0	1	1
11	Jamaica	0	0	1	1
11	Panama	0	0	1	1
Totals (14 entries)		18	18	34	70

== Medalists ==
=== Men's freestyle ===
Event	Gold	Silver	Bronze
57 kg	Vladimir Vila Frometa; Cuba	Charles Farmer; United States	Adrián Samano; Puerto Rico
65 kg	Bo Bassett; United States	Eligh Rivera; Puerto Rico	Víctor Parra; Venezuela
65 kg	Bo Bassett; United States	Eligh Rivera; Puerto Rico	Diego Peraza; Mexico
74 kg	Mitchell Mesenbrink; United States	Orislandy Perdomo; Cuba	Tyler Tracy; Jamaica
74 kg	Mitchell Mesenbrink; United States	Orislandy Perdomo; Cuba	Arnoldo Proboste; Argentina
86 kg	Rocco Welsh; United States	Geannis Garzón; Cuba	Max França; Brazil
86 kg	Rocco Welsh; United States	Geannis Garzón; Cuba	César Ubico; Guatemala
97 kg	Thomas Dineen; United States	Darell Lee Galluso; Cuba	Juan Iturriza; Mexico
125 kg	Lucas Stoddard; United States	Gabriel Silva; Brazil	Víctor Pérez; Dominican Republic
125 kg	Lucas Stoddard; United States	Gabriel Silva; Brazil	Ethan Vergara; Puerto Rico

=== Men's Greco-Roman ===
Event	Gold	Silver	Bronze
60 kg	Maxwell Black; United States	Ángel Segura; Mexico	Cristopher Verastegui; Colombia
60 kg	Maxwell Black; United States	Ángel Segura; Mexico	Yorkis Carvajal; Dominican Republic
67 kg	Jeremy Peralta; Ecuador	Yonat Veliz; Cuba	Ronaldo Sánchez; Colombia
67 kg	Jeremy Peralta; Ecuador	Yonat Veliz; Cuba	Brennan van Hoecke; United States
77 kg	Aydin Rix; United States	Darfel Parada; Venezuela	Nilson Sinisterra; Colombia
77 kg	Aydin Rix; United States	Darfel Parada; Venezuela	Joenni Gómez; Cuba
87 kg	Payton Jacobson; United States	Diego Macías; Mexico	Kauan Gomes; Brazil
87 kg	Payton Jacobson; United States	Diego Macías; Mexico	Brian Ruiz; Venezuela
97 kg	Juan Díaz; Venezuela	Dorian Trejo; Mexico	Ricardo Gómez; Argentina
97 kg	Juan Díaz; Venezuela	Dorian Trejo; Mexico	Keenan Wyatt; United States
130 kg	Aden Attao; United States	Luis Talavera; Venezuela	Wesley Barros; Brazil

=== Women's freestyle ===
Event	Gold	Silver	Bronze
50 kg	Greili Bencosme; Cuba	Ana Beatriz Sales; Brazil	Nohalis Loyo; Venezuela
50 kg	Greili Bencosme; Cuba	Ana Beatriz Sales; Brazil	Ana Palacios; Mexico
53 kg	Alexa Álvarez; Venezuela	Yusmy Chaparro; Colombia	Yusneiry Agrazal; Panama
53 kg	Alexa Álvarez; Venezuela	Yusmy Chaparro; Colombia	Brianna Gonzalez; United States
57 kg	Yaynelis Sanz; Cuba	Bertha Rojas; Mexico	Camila Amarilla; Argentina
57 kg	Yaynelis Sanz; Cuba	Bertha Rojas; Mexico	Mia Friesen; Canada
62 kg	Astrid Montero; Venezuela	María Santana; Cuba	Carina Giangeruso; Puerto Rico
62 kg	Astrid Montero; Venezuela	María Santana; Cuba	Savannah Cosme; United States
68 kg	Gilbery Franco; Venezuela	Brooklyn Hays; United States	Debanhi Tapia; Mexico
68 kg	Gilbery Franco; Venezuela	Brooklyn Hays; United States	Dailianis Canales; Cuba
76 kg	Tristan Kelly; United States	Paola Rodríguez; Puerto Rico	Edna Jiménez; Mexico
76 kg	Tristan Kelly; United States	Paola Rodríguez; Puerto Rico	María Ceballos; Colombia
