= Panama at the 2025 Junior Pan American Games =

- IOC code: PAN
- NOC: Panama Olympic Committee

in Asunción, Paraguay
- Competitors: 34
- Flag bearers: Ana Lucía Beitia; Isaac Dorati
- Medals: Gold 1 Silver 1 Bronze 2 Total 4

Junior Pan American Games appearances (overview)
- 2021; 2025

Panama is competing at the 2025 Junior Pan American Games in Asunción from August 9 to 23, 2025.

The Panamian team consists of 34 athletes.

== Medals by sport ==
Sport	Gold	Silver	Bronze	Total
Swimming	1	1	0	2
Fencing	0	0	1	1
Wrestling	0	0	1	1
Totals (3 entries)	1	1	2	4

== Medalists ==
The following Panamian competitors won medals at the games.

Medal	Name	Sport	Event	Date
Gold	Emily Santos	Swimming	Women's 100-metre breaststroke	August 10
Silver	Emily Santos	Swimming	Women's 200-metre breaststroke	August 12
Bronze	Isaac Dorati	Fencing	Men's épée individual	August 11
Bronze	Yusneiry Agrazal	Wrestling	Women's 53kg freestyle	August 21

== See also ==
- Panama at the Junior Pan American Games
