= List of Oceanian youth records in Olympic weightlifting =

This is the list of Oceanian youth records in Olympic weightlifting. They are the best results set in competition by athletes aged 13 to 17 throughout the entire calendar year of the performance. Records are maintained in each weight class for the snatch, clean and jerk, and the total for both by the Oceania Weightlifting Federation (OWF).

== Current records ==
Key to tables: Awaiting ratification Not ratified or later rescinded by OWF

=== Men ===
Event	Record	Athlete	Nation	Date	Meet	Place	Age	Ref
55 kg
Snatch	85 kg	OWF Standard						
Clean & Jerk	105 kg	OWF Standard						
Total	190 kg	OWF Standard						
60 kg
Snatch	90 kg	OWF Standard						
Clean & Jerk	115 kg	Alfred Degia	Nauru	11 April 2025	Oceania Youth Championships	Hawthorn, Australia	17 years, 9 days	
Total	203 kg	Alfred Degia	Nauru	11 April 2025	Oceania Youth Championships	Hawthorn, Australia	17 years, 9 days	
65 kg
Snatch	100 kg	OWF Standard						
Clean & Jerk	126 kg	Gyro Remirez	Palau	2 July 2025	Pacific Mini Games	Meyuns, Palau	16 years, 329 days	
Total	222 kg	Gyro Remirez	Palau	2 July 2025	Pacific Mini Games	Meyuns, Palau	16 years, 329 days	
70 kg
Snatch	105 kg	OWF Standard						
Clean & Jerk	135 kg	OWF Standard						
Total	240 kg	OWF Standard						
75 kg
Snatch	110 kg	OWF Standard						
Clean & Jerk	145 kg	OWF Standard						
Total	255 kg	OWF Standard						
85 kg
Snatch	120 kg	Nehemiah Elder						
Clean & Jerk	155 kg	Nehemiah Elder						
Total	275 kg	Nehemiah Elder						
95 kg
Snatch	130 kg	Spyke Murray	Australia	20 September 2026	Oceania Cup	Hawthorn, Australia		
Clean & Jerk	160 kg	Spyke Murray	Australia	20 September 2026	Oceania Cup	Hawthorn, Australia		
Total	290 kg	Spyke Murray	Australia	20 September 2026	Oceania Cup	Hawthorn, Australia		
+94 kg
Snatch	135 kg (Note: by official result source; 140 kg by federation source, probably a typo)	Niusila Opeloge	Samoa	20 September 2026	Oceania Cup	Hawthorn, Australia	17 years, 251 days	
Clean & Jerk	175 kg	Niusila Opeloge	Samoa	20 September 2026	Oceania Cup	Hawthorn, Australia	17 years, 251 days	
Total	310 kg	Niusila Opeloge	Samoa	20 September 2026	Oceania Cup	Hawthorn, Australia	17 years, 251 days	

=== Women ===
Event	Record	Athlete	Nation	Date	Meet	Place	Age	Ref
45 kg
Snatch	60 kg	OWF Standard						
Clean & Jerk	70 kg	OWF Standard						
Total	130 kg	OWF Standard						
49 kg
Snatch	65 kg	OWF Standard						
Clean & Jerk	77 kg	OWF Standard						
Total	140 kg	OWF Standard						
53 kg
Snatch	70 kg	OWF Standard						
Clean & Jerk	80 kg	OWF Standard						
Total	150 kg	OWF Standard						
57 kg
Snatch	74 kg	OWF Standard						
Clean & Jerk	89 kg	OWF Standard						
Total	163 kg	OWF Standard						
61 kg
Snatch	85 kg	OWF Standard						
Snatch	95 kg	Femily-Crystie Notte	Nauru	1 November 2026	World Championships	Ningbo, China	17 years, 190 days	
Clean & Jerk	95 kg	OWF Standard						
Clean & Jerk	110 kg	Femily-Crystie Notte	Nauru	1 November 2026	World Championships	Ningbo, China	17 years, 190 days	
Total	180 kg	OWF Standard						
Total	205 kg	Femily-Crystie Notte	Nauru	1 November 2026	World Championships	Ningbo, China	17 years, 190 days	
69 kg
Snatch	98 kg	Femily-Crystie Notte	Nauru	20 September 2026	Oceania Cup	Hawthorn, Australia	17 years, 148 days	
Clean & Jerk	118 kg	Femily-Crystie Notte	Nauru	20 September 2026	Oceania Cup	Hawthorn, Australia	17 years, 148 days	
Total	216 kg	Femily-Crystie Notte	Nauru	20 September 2026	Oceania Cup	Hawthorn, Australia	17 years, 148 days	
77 kg
Snatch	107 kg	Seine Stowers	Samoa	16 November 2025		Hawthorn, Australia	17 years, 200 days	
Clean & Jerk	137 kg	Seine Stowers	Samoa	16 November 2025		Hawthorn, Australia	17 years, 200 days	
Total	244 kg	Seine Stowers	Samoa	16 November 2025		Hawthorn, Australia	17 years, 200 days	
+77 kg
Snatch	100 kg	Anika Falasia	New Zealand	30 August 2025	Commonwealth Youth Championships	Ahmedabad, India	15 years, 244 days	
Clean & Jerk	120 kg	Destiny Uera	Nauru	20 September 2026	Oceania Cup	Hawthorn, Australia	14 years, 314 days	
Clean & Jerk	123 kg	Sefulu Seuao	Samoa	30 April 2026	Oceania Championships	Apia, Samoa	16 years, 352 days	
Total	217 kg	Anika Falasia	New Zealand	30 August 2025	Commonwealth Youth Championships	Ahmedabad, India	15 years, 244 days	
Total	222 kg	Sefulu Seuao	Samoa	30 April 2026	Oceania Championships	Apia, Samoa	16 years, 352 days	

== Historical records ==
=== Men (2025–2026) ===
Event	Record	Athlete	Nation	Date	Meet	Place	Age	Ref
56 kg
Snatch	85 kg	OWF Standard						
Clean & Jerk	105 kg	OWF Standard						
Clean & Jerk	116 kg	Lawrence Reva Oala	Papua New Guinea	27 April 2026	Oceania Championships	Apia, Samoa	16 years, 84 days	
Total	190 kg	OWF Standard						
Total	199 kg	Lawrence Reva Oala	Papua New Guinea	27 April 2026	Oceania Championships	Apia, Samoa	16 years, 84 days	
71 kg
Snatch	106 kg	Faitasia Seuao	Samoa	11 April 2025	Oceania Youth Championships	Hawthorn, Australia	16 years, 360 days	
Snatch	115 kg	Freeman Aumalefo	Solomon Islands	28 April 2026	Oceania Championships	Apia, Samoa	16 years, 362 days	
Clean & Jerk	140 kg	Faitasia Seuao	Samoa	11 April 2025	Oceania Youth Championships	Hawthorn, Australia	16 years, 360 days	
Total	246 kg	Faitasia Seuao	Samoa	11 April 2025	Oceania Youth Championships	Hawthorn, Australia	16 years, 360 days	
Total	255 kg	Freeman Aumalefo	Solomon Islands	28 April 2026	Oceania Championships	Apia, Samoa	16 years, 362 days	
79 kg
Snatch	120 kg	Sione Sasa	Samoa	11 April 2025	Oceania Youth Championships	Hawthorn, Australia	17 years, 83 days	
Snatch	123 kg	Kyle Itsimaera	Nauru	27 August 2025	Commonwealth Youth Championships	Ahmedabad, India	16 years, 330 days	
Clean & Jerk	160 kg	Sione Sasa	Samoa	11 April 2025	Oceania Youth Championships	Hawthorn, Australia	17 years, 83 days	
Total	280 kg	Sione Sasa	Samoa	11 April 2025	Oceania Youth Championships	Hawthorn, Australia	17 years, 83 days	
88 kg
Snatch	142 kg	Nehemiah Elder	Fiji	11 April 2025	Oceania Youth Championships	Hawthorn, Australia	16 years, 28 days	
Snatch	155 kg	Nehemiah Elder	Fiji	4 July 2025	Pacific Mini Games	Meyuns, Palau	16 years, 112 days	
Clean & Jerk	175 kg	Nehemiah Elder	Fiji	11 April 2025	Oceania Youth Championships	Hawthorn, Australia	16 years, 28 days	
Total	317 kg	Nehemiah Elder	Fiji	11 April 2025	Oceania Youth Championships	Hawthorn, Australia	16 years, 28 days	
Total	330 kg	Nehemiah Elder	Fiji	4 July 2025	Pacific Mini Games	Meyuns, Palau	16 years, 112 days	
94 kg
Snatch		OWF Standard						
Clean & Jerk		OWF Standard						
Total		OWF Standard						
+94 kg
Snatch	134 kg	Marcquinz Cook	Nauru	1 May 2026	Oceania Championships	Apia, Samoa	16 years, 254 days	
Clean & Jerk	171 kg	Marcquinz Cook	Nauru	1 May 2026	Oceania Championships	Apia, Samoa	16 years, 254 days	
Total	305 kg	Marcquinz Cook	Nauru	1 May 2026	Oceania Championships	Apia, Samoa	16 years, 254 days	

=== Men (2018–2025) ===
Event	Record	Athlete	Nation	Date	Meet	Place	Age	Ref
49 kg
Snatch	80 kg	OWF Standard						
Clean & Jerk	97 kg	OWF Standard						
Total	176 kg	OWF Standard						
55 kg
Snatch	88 kg	OWF Standard						
Clean & Jerk	108 kg	Gahuna Nauari	Papua New Guinea	9 July 2019	Pacific Games	Apia, Samoa	16 years, 338 days	
Total	194 kg	OWF Standard						
61 kg
Snatch	95 kg	John Tafi	Samoa	10 July 2019	Pacific Games	Apia, Samoa	17 years, 122 days	
Clean & Jerk	115 kg	John Tafi	Samoa	10 July 2019	Pacific Games	Apia, Samoa	17 years, 122 days	
Total	210 kg	John Tafi	Samoa	10 July 2019	Pacific Games	Apia, Samoa	17 years, 122 days	
67 kg
Snatch	115 kg	Ditto Titus Ika	Nauru	6 October 2023	Oceania Junior & Youth Championships	Apia, Samoa	17 years, 68 days	
Clean & Jerk	154 kg	Ditto Titus Ika	Nauru	6 October 2023	Oceania Junior & Youth Championships	Apia, Samoa	17 years, 68 days	
Total	269 kg	Ditto Titus Ika	Nauru	6 October 2023	Oceania Junior & Youth Championships	Apia, Samoa	17 years, 68 days	
73 kg
Snatch	110 kg	Nehemiah Elder	Fiji	6 October 2023	Oceania Junior & Youth Championships	Apia, Samoa	14 years, 206 days	
Snatch	125 kg	Nehemiah Elder	Fiji	22 February 2024	Oceania Junior & Youth Championships	Auckland, New Zealand	15 years, 39 days	
Clean & Jerk	133 kg	Nehemiah Elder	Fiji	6 October 2023	Oceania Junior & Youth Championships	Apia, Samoa	14 years, 206 days	
Clean & Jerk	137 kg	Nehemiah Elder	Fiji	22 February 2024	Oceania Junior & Youth Championships	Auckland, New Zealand	15 years, 39 days	
Total	243 kg	Nehemiah Elder	Fiji	6 October 2023	Oceania Junior & Youth Championships	Apia, Samoa	14 years, 206 days	
Total	262 kg	Nehemiah Elder	Fiji	22 February 2024	Oceania Junior & Youth Championships	Auckland, New Zealand	15 years, 39 days	
81 kg
Snatch	115 kg	Tovio Ah Chong	Samoa	6 October 2023	Oceania Junior & Youth Championships	Apia, Samoa	17 years, 44 days	
Snatch	120 kg	Kyle Itsimaera	Nauru	2 May 2025	World Youth Championships	Lima, Peru	16 years, 213 days	
Clean & Jerk	154 kg	Tovio Ah Chong	Samoa	6 October 2023	Oceania Junior & Youth Championships	Apia, Samoa	17 years, 44 days	
Total	269 kg	Tovio Ah Chong	Samoa	6 October 2023	Oceania Junior & Youth Championships	Apia, Samoa	17 years, 44 days	
Total	270 kg	Kyle Itsimaera	Nauru	2 May 2025	World Youth Championships	Lima, Peru	16 years, 213 days	
89 kg
Snatch	125 kg	Emmanuel Ulimasao	Samoa	22 November 2023	Pacific Games	Honiara, Solomon Islands	17 years, 164 days	
Snatch	152 kg	Nehemiah Elder	Fiji	3 May 2025	World Youth Championships	Lima, Peru	16 years, 50 days	
Clean & Jerk	151 kg	Emmanuel Ulimasao	Samoa	22 November 2023	Pacific Games	Honiara, Solomon Islands	17 years, 164 days	
Clean & Jerk	180 kg	Nehemiah Elder	Fiji	3 May 2025	World Youth Championships	Lima, Peru	16 years, 50 days	
Total	276 kg	Emmanuel Ulimasao	Samoa	22 November 2023	Pacific Games	Honiara, Solomon Islands	17 years, 164 days	
Total	332 kg	Nehemiah Elder	Fiji	3 May 2025	World Youth Championships	Lima, Peru	16 years, 50 days	
96 kg
Snatch	123 kg	OWF Standard						
Snatch	130 kg	Zion Tokona	Fiji	23 February 2024	Oceania Junior & Youth Championships	Auckland, New Zealand	17 years, 19 days	
Clean & Jerk	147 kg	OWF Standard						
Clean & Jerk	148 kg	Zion Tokona	Fiji	23 February 2024	Oceania Junior & Youth Championships	Auckland, New Zealand	17 years, 19 days	
Total	269 kg	OWF Standard						
Total	278 kg	Zion Tokona	Fiji	23 February 2024	Oceania Junior & Youth Championships	Auckland, New Zealand	17 years, 19 days	
102 kg
Snatch	125 kg	OWF Standard						
Clean & Jerk	151 kg	OWF Standard						
Total	275 kg	OWF Standard						
+102 kg
Snatch	138 kg	OWF Standard						
Clean & Jerk	167 kg	OWF Standard						
Total	304 kg	OWF Standard						

=== Men (1998–2018) ===
Event	Record	Athlete	Nation	Date	Meet	Place	Age	Ref
50 kg
Snatch	77 kg	Heni Lohia	Papua New Guinea	5 July 2015	Oceania Youth Championships	Port Moresby, Papua New Guinea	17 years, 4 days	
Clean & Jerk	88 kg	Cameron Moss	New Zealand	1 December 2012	Club contest	Auckland, New Zealand	15 years, 228 days	
Total	157 kg	Heni Lohia	Papua New Guinea	5 July 2015	Oceania Youth Championships	Port Moresby, Papua New Guinea	17 years, 4 days	
56 kg
Snatch	97 kg	Elson Brechtefeld	Nauru	11 May 2011		Moindou, New Caledonia	17 years, 70 days	
Clean & Jerk	127 kg	Willen Dageago	Nauru	25 November 2000		Nauru	17 years, 120 days	
Total	218 kg	Elson Brechtefeld	Nauru	20 November 2010		Moindou, New Caledonia	16 years, 263 days	
62 kg
Snatch	110 kg	David Sarkisian	Australia	29 March 2003	VWA Open	Hawthorn, Australia	16 years, 92 days	
Clean & Jerk	140 kg	David Sarkisian	Australia	29 March 2003	VWA Open	Hawthorn, Australia	16 years, 92 days	
Total	250 kg	David Sarkisian	Australia	29 March 2003	VWA Open	Hawthorn, Australia	16 years, 92 days	
69 kg
Snatch	125 kg	Yukio Peter	Nauru	29 December 2001		Tarawa, Kiribati	17 years, 334 days	
Clean & Jerk	165 kg	Yukio Peter	Nauru	29 December 2001		Tarawa, Kiribati	17 years, 334 days	
Total	290 kg	Yukio Peter	Nauru	29 December 2001		Tarawa, Kiribati	17 years, 334 days	
77 kg
Snatch	128 kg	Steven Kari	Papua New Guinea	7 October 2010	Commonwealth Games	Delhi, India	17 years, 147 days	
Clean & Jerk	169 kg	Steven Kari	Papua New Guinea	15 December 2010	Continental Clubs Grand Prix	Penang, Malaysia	17 years, 216 days	
Total	296 kg	Steven Kari	Papua New Guinea	15 December 2010	Continental Clubs Grand Prix	Penang, Malaysia	17 years, 216 days	
85 kg
Snatch	131 kg	Steven Kari	Papua New Guinea	20 November 2010	Moindou Cup	Moindou, New Caledonia	17 years, 191 days	
Clean & Jerk	173 kg	Steven Kari	Papua New Guinea	20 November 2010	Moindou Cup	Moindou, New Caledonia	17 years, 191 days	
Total	303 kg	Steven Kari	Papua New Guinea	20 November 2010	Moindou Cup	Moindou, New Caledonia	17 years, 191 days	
94 kg
Snatch	125 kg	Ben Ward	Australia	9 July 2017	Australian Youth Championships	Brisbane, Australia	16 years, 286 days	
Clean & Jerk	161 kg	Robert Galsworthy	Australia	8 September 2006	Australian Championships	Hawthorn, Australia	17 years, 114 days	
Total	283 kg	Ben Ward	Australia	9 July 2017	Australian Youth Championships	Brisbane, Australia	16 years, 286 days	
+94 kg
Snatch	150 kg	Itte Detenamo	Nauru	11 July 2003		Suva, Fiji	16 years, 292 days	
Clean & Jerk	195 kg	Itte Detenamo	Nauru	21 November 2003	World Championships	Vancouver, Canada	17 years, 60 days	
Total	345 kg	Itte Detenamo	Nauru	21 November 2003	World Championships	Vancouver, Canada	17 years, 60 days	

=== Women (2025–2026) ===
Event	Record	Athlete	Nation	Date	Meet	Place	Age	Ref
44 kg
Snatch	60 kg	OWF Standard						
Clean & Jerk	70 kg	OWF Standard						
Total	130 kg	OWF Standard						
48 kg
Snatch	65 kg	OWF Standard						
Clean & Jerk	75 kg	OWF Standard						
Total	140 kg	OWF Standard						
58 kg
Snatch	75 kg	OWF Standard						
Clean & Jerk	90 kg	OWF Standard						
Total	165 kg	OWF Standard						
63 kg
Snatch	80 kg	OWF Standard						
Snatch	88 kg	Femily-Crystie Notte	Nauru	27 August 2025	Commonwealth Youth Championships	Ahmedabad, India	16 years, 124 days	
Snatch	90 kg	Femily-Crystie Notte	Nauru	3 July 2025	Pacific Mini Games	Meyuns, Palau	16 years, 69 days	
Snatch	101 kg	Femily-Crystie Notte	Nauru	29 April 2026	Oceania Championships	Apia, Samoa	17 years, 4 days	
Clean & Jerk	100 kg	OWF Standard						
Clean & Jerk	111 kg	Femily-Crystie Notte	Nauru	3 July 2025	Pacific Mini Games	Meyuns, Palau	16 years, 69 days	
Clean & Jerk	112 kg	Femily-Crystie Notte	Nauru	27 August 2025	Commonwealth Youth Championships	Ahmedabad, India	16 years, 124 days	
Clean & Jerk	123 kg	Femily-Crystie Notte	Nauru	29 April 2026	Oceania Championships	Apia, Samoa	17 years, 4 days	
Total	180 kg	OWF Standard						
Total	200 kg	Femily-Crystie Notte	Nauru	27 August 2025	Commonwealth Youth Championships	Ahmedabad, India	16 years, 124 days	
Total	201 kg	Femily-Crystie Notte	Nauru	3 July 2025	Pacific Mini Games	Meyuns, Palau	16 years, 69 days	
Total	224 kg	Femily-Crystie Notte	Nauru	29 April 2026	Oceania Championships	Apia, Samoa	17 years, 4 days	

=== Women (2018–2025) ===
Event	Record	Athlete	Nation	Date	Meet	Place	Age	Ref
40 kg
Snatch	51 kg	OWF Standard						
Clean & Jerk	63 kg	OWF Standard						
Total	113 kg	OWF Standard						
45 kg
Snatch	56 kg	OWF Standard						
Clean & Jerk	71 kg	OWF Standard						
Total	126 kg	OWF Standard						
49 kg
Snatch	65 kg	Rowena Donga	Solomon Islands	20 November 2023	Pacific Games	Honiara, Solomon Islands	16 years, 204 days	
Clean & Jerk	84 kg	Rowena Donga	Solomon Islands	20 November 2023	Pacific Games	Honiara, Solomon Islands	16 years, 204 days	
Total	149 kg	Rowena Donga	Solomon Islands	20 November 2023	Pacific Games	Honiara, Solomon Islands	16 years, 204 days	
55 kg
Snatch	76 kg	Lorah Maelosia	Solomon Islands	20 November 2023	Pacific Games	Honiara, Solomon Islands	16 years, 364 days	
Clean & Jerk	94 kg	Lorah Maelosia	Solomon Islands	20 November 2023	Pacific Games	Honiara, Solomon Islands	16 years, 364 days	
Total	170 kg	Lorah Maelosia	Solomon Islands	20 November 2023	Pacific Games	Honiara, Solomon Islands	16 years, 364 days	
59 kg
Snatch	72 kg	My-Only Stephen	Nauru	28 May 2022		Nauru	16 years, 6 days	
Clean & Jerk	92 kg	My-Only Stephen	Nauru	28 May 2022		Nauru	16 years, 6 days	
Total	164 kg	My-Only Stephen	Nauru	28 May 2022		Nauru	16 years, 6 days	
64 kg
Snatch	85 kg	Nancy Abouke	Nauru	27 April 2019	Arafura Games	Darwin, Australia	15 years, 296 days	
Snatch	86 kg	Nancy Abouke	Nauru	7 December 2019	Pacific Cup	Noumea, New Caledonia	16 years, 155 days	
Snatch	90 kg	Femily-Crystie Notte	Nauru	23 February 2024	Oceania Junior & Youth Championships	Auckland, New Zealand	14 years, 304 days	
Snatch	92 kg	Femily-Crystie Notte	Nauru	2 May 2025	World Youth Championships	Lima, Peru	16 years, 7 days	
Clean & Jerk	110 kg	Nancy Abouke	Nauru	4 June 2019	Junior World Championships	Suva, Fiji	15 years, 334 days	
Clean & Jerk	115 kg	Femily-Crystie Notte	Nauru	23 February 2024	Oceania Junior & Youth Championships	Auckland, New Zealand	14 years, 304 days	
Total	190 kg	Nancy Abouke	Nauru	10 July 2019	Pacific Games	Apia, Samoa	16 years, 5 days	
Total	191 kg	Olivia Selemaia	New Zealand	29 March 2023	Youth World Championships	Durrës, Albania	17 years, 31 days	
Total	205 kg	Femily-Crystie Notte	Nauru	23 February 2024	Oceania Junior & Youth Championships	Auckland, New Zealand	14 years, 304 days	
71 kg
Snatch	92 kg	Olivia Selemaia	New Zealand	14 October 2023		Auckland, New Zealand	17 years, 230 days	
Clean & Jerk	111 kg	Nancy Abouke	Nauru	29 February 2020		Canberra, Australia	16 years, 239 days	
Clean & Jerk	113 kg	Maximina Uepa	Nauru	7 December 2019	Pacific Cup	Noumea, New Caledonia	16 years, 292 days	
Total	198 kg	Nancy Abouke	Nauru	29 February 2020		Canberra, Australia	16 years, 239 days	
Total	200 kg	Maximina Uepa	Nauru	7 December 2019	Pacific Cup	Noumea, New Caledonia	16 years, 292 days	
76 kg
Snatch	80 kg	OWF Standard						
Snatch	98 kg	Seine Stowers	Samoa	3 May 2025	World Youth Championships	Lima, Peru	17 years, 3 days	
Clean & Jerk	100 kg	OWF Standard						
Clean & Jerk	116 kg	Seine Stowers	Samoa	3 May 2025	World Youth Championships	Lima, Peru	17 years, 3 days	
Total	179 kg	OWF Standard						
Total	214 kg	Seine Stowers	Samoa	3 May 2025	World Youth Championships	Lima, Peru	17 years, 3 days	
81 kg
Snatch	90 kg	Faustina Opeloge	Samoa	23 June 2022	Pacific Mini Games	Saipan, Northern Mariana Islands		
Clean & Jerk	107 kg	Faustina Opeloge	Samoa	23 June 2022	Pacific Mini Games	Saipan, Northern Mariana Islands		
Total	197 kg	Faustina Opeloge	Samoa	23 June 2022	Pacific Mini Games	Saipan, Northern Mariana Islands		
+81 kg
Snatch	95 kg	OWF Standard						
Snatch	97 kg	Mollie King	New Zealand	4 May 2025	World Youth Championships	Lima, Peru	17 years, 110 days	
Clean & Jerk	118 kg	OWF Standard						
Clean & Jerk	126 kg	Mollie King	New Zealand	4 May 2025	World Youth Championships	Lima, Peru	17 years, 110 days	
Total	212 kg	OWF Standard						
Total	223 kg	Mollie King	New Zealand	4 May 2025	World Youth Championships	Lima, Peru	17 years, 110 days	

=== Women (1998–2018) ===
Event	Record	Athlete	Nation	Date	Meet	Place	Age	Ref
44 kg
Snatch	45 kg							
Clean & Jerk	54 kg							
Total	99 kg							
48 kg
Snatch	60							
Clean & Jerk	80							
Total	140							
53 kg
Snatch	64							
Clean & Jerk	83							
Total	146							
58 kg
Snatch	78							
Clean & Jerk	99							
Total	177							
63 kg
Snatch	85 kg	Sheba Deireragea	Nauru	3 November 2001		Nauru	15 years, 159 days	
Clean & Jerk	110 kg	Sheba Deireragea	Nauru	3 November 2001		Nauru	15 years, 159 days	
Total	195 kg	Sheba Deireragea	Nauru	3 November 2001		Nauru	15 years, 159 days	
69 kg
Snatch	93 kg	Eileen Cikamatana	Fiji	26 May 2016		Suva, Fiji		
Clean & Jerk	122 kg	Eileen Cikamatana	Fiji	24 October 2016		Penang, Malaysia		
Total	215 kg	Eileen Cikamatana	Fiji	24 October 2016		Penang, Malaysia		
+69 kg
Snatch	93 kg							
Clean & Jerk	117 kg							
Total	208 kg							
