= Weightlifting at the 2025 Pacific Mini Games =

- Location: Meyuns, Palau
- Dates: 2–5 July 2025

Weightlifting at the 2025 Pacific Mini Games in Palau was held on 2–5 July 2025 at the Meyuns Multi-purpose Gymnasium in Meyuns, Palau.

== Competition schedule ==
Schedule
| Date | Jul 2 | Jul 3 | Jul 4 | Jul 5 |
|---|---|---|---|---|
| Men's 60kg | F | | | |
| Men's 65kg | F | | | |
| Men's 71kg | | F | | |
| Men's 79kg | | F | | |
| Men's 88kg | | | F | |
| Men's 94kg | | | F | |
| Men's 110kg | | | F | |
| Men's 110+kg | | | | F |
| Women's 48kg | F | | | |
| Women's 53kg | F | | | |
| Women's 58kg | F | | | |
| Women's 63kg | | F | | |
| Women's 69kg | | F | | |
| Women's 77kg | | | F | |
| Women's 86kg | | | F | |
| Women's 86+kg | | | | F |

== Medal summary ==
=== Medal table ===
* Host nation (Palau)

| Rank | Nation | Gold | Silver | Bronze | Total |
|---|---|---|---|---|---|
| 1 | Samoa (SAM) | 15 | 8 | 6 | 29 |
| 2 | Australia (AUS) | 15 | 6 | 9 | 30 |
| 3 | Papua New Guinea (PNG) | 5 | 2 | 7 | 14 |
| 4 | Fiji (FIJ) | 4 | 3 | 4 | 11 |
| 5 | Nauru (NRU) | 3 | 20 | 3 | 26 |
| 6 | Kiribati (KIR) | 3 | 0 | 1 | 4 |
| 7 | New Zealand (NZL) | 2 | 3 | 4 | 9 |
| 8 | Guam (GUM) | 1 | 2 | 0 | 3 |
| 9 | Vanuatu (VAN) | 0 | 3 | 0 | 3 |
| 10 | Northern Mariana Islands (NMI) | 0 | 1 | 4 | 5 |
| 11 | French Polynesia (TAH) | 0 | 0 | 3 | 3 |
| 11 | Marshall Islands (MHL) | 0 | 0 | 3 | 3 |
| 13 | Palau (PLW)* | 0 | 0 | 2 | 2 |
| 13 | Tuvalu (TUV) | 0 | 0 | 2 | 2 |
| Totals (14 entries) | | 48 | 48 | 48 | 144 |

=== Men's ===
| Event | Gold | | Silver | | Bronze | |
|---|---|---|---|---|---|---|
| 60 kg snatch | Shadrach Cain (NRU) | 102 kg | Johannes Adam (NRU) | 101 kg | Reinataake Takenteiti (KIR) | 96 kg |
| 60 kg clean & jerk | Shadrach Cain (NRU) | 130 kg | Johannes Adam (NRU) | 128 kg | Blaine Patris (PLW) | 121 kg |
| 60 kg total | Shadrach Cain (NRU) | 232 kg | Johannes Adam (NRU) | 229 kg | Blaine Patris (PLW) | 216 kg |
| 65 kg snatch | Morea Baru (PNG) | 117 kg | Ditto Ika (NRU) | 116 kg | Falevaa Tafi (SAM) | 105 kg |
| 65 kg clean & jerk | Morea Baru (PNG) | 156 kg | Ditto Ika (NRU) | 152 kg | Leowell Cristobal (NMI) | 141 kg |
| 65 kg total | Morea Baru (PNG) | 273 kg | Ditto Ika (NRU) | 268 kg | Leowell Cristobal (NMI) | 244 kg |
| 71 kg snatch | John Tafi (SAM) | 136 kg | Poama Qaqa (FIJ) | 126 kg | Manuila Raobu (TUV) | 125 kg |
| 71 kg clean & jerk | John Tafi (SAM) | 169 kg | Ezekiel Moses (NRU) | 168 kg | Poama Qaqa (FIJ) | 150 kg |
| 71 kg total | John Tafi (SAM) | 305 kg | Poama Qaqa (FIJ) | 276 kg | Manuila Raobu (TUV) | 274 kg |
| 79 kg snatch | Ruben Katoatau (KIR) | 126 kg | Kyle Itsimaera (NRU) | 125 kg | Spartan Teimitsi (NRU) | 117 kg |
| 79 kg clean & jerk | Ruben Katoatau (KIR) | 157 kg | Kyle Itsimaera (NRU) | 156 kg | Daniel Shaw (FIJ) | 155 kg |
| 79 kg total | Ruben Katoatau (KIR) | 283 kg | Kyle Itsimaera (NRU) | 281 kg | Daniel Shaw (FIJ) | 270 kg |
| 88 kg snatch | Nehemiah Elder (FIJ) | 155 kg | Marcincy Cook (NRU) | 128 kg | Teihoarii Buchin (TAH) | 126 kg |
| 88 kg clean & jerk | Nehemiah Elder (FIJ) | 175 kg | Marcincy Cook (NRU) | 160 kg | Teihoarii Buchin (TAH) | 146 kg |
| 88 kg total | Nehemiah Elder (FIJ) | 330 kg | Marcincy Cook (NRU) | 288 kg | Teihoarii Buchin (TAH) | 272 kg |
| 94 kg snatch | Emmanuel Palota Ulimasao (SAM) | 139 kg | Uea Detudamo (NRU) | 138 kg | Noah Milford (AUS) | 131 kg |
| 94 kg clean & jerk | Emmanuel Palota Ulimasao (SAM) | 180 kg | Noah Milford (AUS) | 173 kg | Uea Detudamo (NRU) | 165 kg |
| 94 kg total | Emmanuel Palota Ulimasao (SAM) | 319 kg | Noah Milford (AUS) | 304 kg | Uea Detudamo (NRU) | 303 kg |
| 110 kg snatch | Taniela Rainibogi (FIJ) | 160 kg | Jack Opeloge (SAM) | 158 kg | Jackson Roberts-Young (AUS) | 145 kg |
| 110 kg clean & jerk | Jack Opeloge (SAM) | 201 kg | Jackson Roberts-Young (AUS) | 197 kg | Taniela Rainibogi (FIJ) | 196 kg |
| 110 kg total | Jack Opeloge (SAM) | 359 kg | Taniela Rainibogi (FIJ) | 356 kg | Jackson Roberts-Young (AUS) | 342 kg |
| +110 kg snatch | Sanele Mao (SAM) | 161 kg | David Liti (NZL) | 160 kg | Joey Colisao (NMI) | 140 kg |
| +110 kg clean & jerk | David Liti (NZL) | 175 kg | Steven Kari (PNG) | 170 kg | Jason Limes (NMI) | 168 kg |
| +110 kg total | David Liti (NZL) | 335 kg | Joey Colisao (NMI) | 305 kg | Steven Kari (PNG) | 300 kg |

=== Women's ===
| Event | Gold | | Silver | | Bronze | |
|---|---|---|---|---|---|---|
| 48 kg snatch | Jianne Gungon (AUS) | 68 kg | Jo-beth Deireragea (NRU) | 67 kg | Thelma Toua (PNG) | 61 kg |
| 48 kg clean & jerk | Jianne Gungon (AUS) | 84 kg | Jo-beth Deireragea (NRU) | 83 kg | Thelma Toua (PNG) | 81 kg |
| 48 kg total | Jianne Gungon (AUS) | 152 kg | Jo-beth Deireragea (NRU) | 150 kg | Thelma Toua (PNG) | 142 kg |
| 53 kg snatch | Chloe Santos (GUM) | 71 kg | Dika Toua (PNG) | 69 kg | Idau Vagi (PNG) | 65 kg |
| 53 kg clean & jerk | Dika Toua (PNG) | 91 kg | Chloe Santos (GUM) | 80 kg | Idau Vagi (PNG) | 78 kg |
| 53 kg total | Dika Toua (PNG) | 160 kg | Chloe Santos (GUM) | 151 kg | Idau Vagi (PNG) | 143 kg |
| 58 kg snatch | Tessa Rim (AUS) | 83 kg | Brenna Kean (AUS) | 79 kg | Anoni Taulua (SAM) | 76 kg |
| 58 kg clean & jerk | Brenna Kean (AUS) | 108 kg | Tessa Rim (AUS) | 100 kg | Anoni Taulua (SAM) | 93 kg |
| 58 kg total | Brenna Kean (AUS) | 187 kg | Tessa Rim (AUS) | 183 kg | Anoni Taulua (SAM) | 169 kg |
| 63 kg snatch | Kiana Elliott (AUS) | 98 kg | Femily-Crystie Notte (NRU) | 90 kg | Zoe De Gersigny (AUS) | 89 kg |
| 63 kg clean & jerk | Kiana Elliott (AUS) | 115 kg | Femily-Crystie Notte (NRU) | 111 kg | Zoe De Gersigny (AUS) | 108 kg |
| 63 kg total | Kiana Elliott (AUS) | 213 kg | Femily-Crystie Notte (NRU) | 201 kg | Zoe De Gersigny (AUS) | 197 kg |
| 69 kg snatch | Nya Hayman (AUS) | 93 kg | Sefulu Seuao (SAM) | 88 kg | Sienna Fesolai (NZL) | 87 kg |
| 69 kg clean & jerk | Nya Hayman (AUS) | 116 kg | Sienna Fesolai (NZL) | 110 kg | Sefulu Seuao (SAM) | 104 kg |
| 69 kg total | Nya Hayman (AUS) | 209 kg | Sienna Fesolai (NZL) | 197 kg | Sefulu Seuao (SAM) | 192 kg |
| 77 kg snatch | Seine Stowers (SAM) | 99 kg | Avatu Opeloge (SAM) | 98 kg | Olivia Shelton (AUS) | 97 kg |
| 77 kg clean & jerk | Seine Stowers (SAM) | 128 kg | Avatu Opeloge (SAM) | 127 kg | Olivia Shelton (AUS) | 123 kg |
| 77 kg total | Seine Stowers (SAM) | 227 kg | Avatu Opeloge (SAM) | 225 kg | Olivia Shelton (AUS) | 220 kg |
| 86 kg snatch | Eileen Cikamatana (AUS) | 115 kg | Ajah Pritchard-Lolo (VAN) | 90 kg | Merean Atantaake (MHL) | 80 kg |
| 86 kg clean & jerk | Eileen Cikamatana (AUS) | 140 kg | Ajah Pritchard-Lolo (VAN) | 110 kg | Merean Atantaake (MHL) | 105 kg |
| 86 kg total | Eileen Cikamatana (AUS) | 255 kg | Ajah Pritchard-Lolo (VAN) | 200 kg | Merean Atantaake (MHL) | 185 kg |
| +86 kg snatch | Iuniarra Sipaia (SAM) | 106 kg | Lesila Fiapule (SAM) | 105 kg | Tui-Alofa Patolo (NZL) | 104 kg |
| +86 kg clean & jerk | Iuniarra Sipaia (SAM) | 145 kg | Lesila Fiapule (SAM) | 134 kg | Judy Soloai (NZL) | 132 kg |
| +86 kg total | Iuniarra Sipaia (SAM) | 251 kg | Lesila Fiapule (SAM) | 239 kg | Judy Soloai (NZL) | 225 kg |

== See also ==
- Weightlifting at the Pacific Games
- Weightlifting at the 2023 Pacific Games
