= List of Australian records in Olympic weightlifting =

The following are the national records in Olympic weightlifting in Australia. Records are maintained in each weight class for the snatch lift, clean and jerk lift, and the total for both lifts by the Australian Weightlifting Federation (AWF).

== Current records ==
Key to tables: Awaiting ratification Not ratified or later rescinded by AWF

=== Men ===
Event	Record	Athlete	Date	Meet	Place	Ref
60 kg
Snatch	70 kg	Gabriel Intal	25 September 2026	QWA State Championships	Chandler, Australia	
Clean & Jerk	90 kg	Gabriel Intal	25 September 2026	QWA State Championships	Chandler, Australia	
Total	160 kg	Gabriel Intal	25 September 2026	QWA State Championships	Chandler, Australia	
65 kg
Snatch	107 kg	Jeremy Nguyen	12 April 2025	Montage Barbell Open	Newcastle, Australia	
Clean & Jerk	133 kg	Jeremy Nguyen	30 August 2025	New South Wales Championships	Sydney, Australia	
Total	238 kg	Jeremy Nguyen	30 August 2025	New South Wales Championships	Sydney, Australia	
70 kg
Snatch	105 kg	Jeremy Nguyen	8 August 2026	Memorial Open	Sydney, Australia	
Clean & Jerk	143 kg	Daniel Pitisano	18 September 2026	Victorian Championships	Hawthorn, Australia	
Total	243 kg	Daniel Pitisano	18 September 2026	Victorian Championships	Hawthorn, Australia	
75 kg
Snatch	118 kg	Jack Yang	31 August 2026	New South Wales Championships	Sydney, Australia	
Clean & Jerk	150 kg	Joshua Wu	31 August 2026	New South Wales Championships	Sydney, Australia	
Total	265 kg	Joshua Wu	31 August 2026	New South Wales Championships	Sydney, Australia	
85 kg
Snatch	130 kg	Frank Elliott	15 August 2026	Crossfit Proficient Club Comp	Windsor Gardens, Australia	
Clean & Jerk	161 kg	Tiago Hallen	20 September 2026	WACT State Titles	Hume, Australia	
Total	285 kg	Frank Elliott	15 August 2026	Crossfit Proficient Club Comp	Windsor Gardens, Australia	
95 kg
Snatch	150 kg	Oliver Saxton	4 November 2026	World Championships	Ningbo, China	
Clean & Jerk	180 kg	Oliver Saxton	4 November 2026	World Championships	Ningbo, China	
Total	330 kg	Oliver Saxton	4 November 2026	World Championships	Ningbo, China	
110 kg
Snatch	161 kg	Ridge Barredo	1 May 2026	Oceania Championships	Apia, Samoa	
Clean & Jerk	206 kg	Jackson Roberts-Young	30 August 2025	Commonwealth Championships	Ahmedabad, India	
Total	357 kg	Ridge Barredo	1 May 2026	Oceania Championships	Apia, Samoa	
+110 kg
Snatch	180 kg	Suamili Nanai	28 March 2026	OX WLC	O'Connor, Australia	
Clean & Jerk	220 kg	Suamili Nanai	28 March 2026	OX WLC	O'Connor, Australia	
Total	400 kg	Suamili Nanai	28 March 2026	OX WLC	O'Connor, Australia	

=== Women ===
Event	Record	Athlete	Date	Meet	Place	Ref
49 kg
Snatch	61 kg	Emma Searle-Bramble	12 September 2026	AusFitness Expo Invitational	Sydney, Australia	
Clean & Jerk	80 kg	Emma Searle-Bramble	12 September 2026	AusFitness Expo Invitational	Sydney, Australia	
Total	141 kg	Emma Searle-Bramble	12 September 2026	AusFitness Expo Invitational	Sydney, Australia	
53 kg
Snatch	76 kg	Chloe Perkins	6 December 2025	Cougars Cup	Chandler, Australia	
Clean & Jerk	99 kg	Brenna Kean	27 April 2026	Universal Cup	Apia, Samoa	
Total	172 kg	Brenna Kean	27 April 2026	Universal Cup	Apia, Samoa	
57 kg
Snatch	71 kg	Jessie Miles	28 September 2026		Balcatta, Australia	
Clean & Jerk	91 kg	Natalya Ghetto	31 August 2026	New South Wales Championships	Sydney, Australia	
Total	161 kg	Natalya Ghetto	31 August 2026	New South Wales Championships	Sydney, Australia	
61 kg
Snatch	84 kg	Yasmin Aziz	23 September 2026	Oceania Cup International	Hawthorn, Australia	
Clean & Jerk	106 kg	Yasmin Aziz	23 September 2026	Oceania Cup International	Hawthorn, Australia	
Total	190 kg	Yasmin Aziz	23 September 2026	Oceania Cup International	Hawthorn, Australia	
69 kg
Snatch	102 kg	Nya Hayman	29 June 2026	HrdKAW Weightlifting Open	Kings Park, Australia	
Clean & Jerk	122 kg	Nya Hayman	29 June 2026	HrdKAW Weightlifting Open	Kings Park, Australia	
Total	224 kg	Nya Hayman	29 June 2026	HrdKAW Weightlifting Open	Kings Park, Australia	
77 kg
Snatch	105 kg	Samantha Saxton	3 July 2026		Balcatta, Australia	
Clean & Jerk	126 kg	Isabella Andueza	16 November 2025	Australian Championships	Hawthorn, Australia	
Total	225 kg	Nya Hayman	27 September 2026	QWA State Championships	Chandler, Australia	
86 kg
Snatch	115 kg	Eileen Cikamatana	4 July 2025	Pacific Mini Games	Meyuns, Palau	
Clean & Jerk	148 kg	Eileen Cikamatana	13 April 2025	Oceania Cup	Hawthorn, Australia	
Total	260 kg	Eileen Cikamatana	13 April 2025	Oceania Cup	Hawthorn, Australia	
+86 kg
Snatch	116 kg	Eileen Cikamatana	14 September 2025	Victorian Championships	Hawthorn, Australia	
Clean & Jerk	141 kg	Eileen Cikamatana	14 September 2025	Victorian Championships	Hawthorn, Australia	
Total	257 kg	Eileen Cikamatana	14 September 2025	Victorian Championships	Hawthorn, Australia	

== Historical records ==
=== Men (2025–2026) ===
Event	Record	Athlete	Date	Meet	Place	Ref
71 kg
Snatch	120 kg	Aedam Quinn	28 September 2025	WWA Championships	Balcatta, Australia	
Clean & Jerk	154 kg	Brandon Wakeling	14 November 2025	Australian Championships	Hawthorn, Australia	
Total	270 kg	Brandon Wakeling	14 November 2025	Australian Championships	Hawthorn, Australia	
79 kg
Snatch	135 kg	Rory Scott	15 May 2026	Commonwealth Games Qualifying Event	La Prairie, Canada	
Clean & Jerk	169 kg	Rory Scott	15 May 2026	Commonwealth Games Qualifying Event	La Prairie, Canada	
Total	304 kg	Rory Scott	15 May 2026	Commonwealth Games Qualifying Event	La Prairie, Canada	
88 kg
Snatch	140 kg	Ryven Ewing	27 September 2025	Cougars Club Challenge	Chandler, Australia	
Clean & Jerk	178 kg	Ryven Ewing	30 April 2026	Oceania Championships	Apia, Samoa	
Total	314 kg	Ryven Ewing	30 April 2026	Oceania Championships	Apia, Samoa	
94 kg
Snatch	161 kg	Oliver Saxton	16 November 2025	Australian Championships	Hawthorn, Australia	
Clean & Jerk	188 kg	Oliver Saxton	30 April 2026	Oceania Championships	Apia, Samoa	
Total	345 kg	Oliver Saxton	30 April 2026	Oceania Championships	Apia, Samoa	

=== Men (2018–2025) ===
Event	Record	Athlete	Date	Meet	Place	Ref
55 kg
Snatch	78 kg	Standard				
Clean & Jerk	100 kg	Standard				
Total	178 kg	Standard				
61 kg
Snatch	97 kg	Jake Stanley	29 October 2023	Ox Club Comp 2	O'Connor, Australia	
Clean & Jerk	130 kg	Kenneth Barnett	24 July 2021	WWA Championships		
Total	226 kg	Kenneth Barnett	24 July 2021	WWA Championships		
67 kg
Snatch	115 kg	Vannara Be	23 April 2021	Victorian Championships		
Clean & Jerk	140 kg	Daniel Pitisano	6 July 2024	HWC Bill Keir Memorial	Hawthorn, Australia	
Total	247 kg	Vannara Be	23 April 2021	Victorian Championships		
73 kg
Snatch	127 kg	Standard				
Clean & Jerk	175 kg	Brandon Wakeling	25 July 2020	Queensland Club Challenge	Chandler, Australia	
Total	302 kg	Brandon Wakeling	25 July 2020	Queensland Club Challenge	Chandler, Australia	
81 kg
Snatch	149 kg	Kyle Bruce	23 October 2021	AWF WWC Squad Invitational Competition		
Clean & Jerk	182 kg	Kyle Bruce	23 October 2021	AWF WWC Squad Invitational Competition		
Total	331 kg	Kyle Bruce	23 October 2021	AWF WWC Squad Invitational Competition		
89 kg
Snatch	150 kg	Kyle Bruce	19 November 2022	Australian Championships	Canberra, Australia	
Clean & Jerk	190 kg	Kyle Bruce	21 May 2021	NSW Championships	Sydney, Australia	
Total	338 kg	Kyle Bruce	21 May 2021	NSW Championships	Sydney, Australia	
96 kg
Snatch	161 kg	David James	23 May 2021	WWA State Masters & Open	Balcatta, Australia	
Clean & Jerk	188 kg	Noah Milford	25 September 2024	World Junior Championships	León, Spain	
Total	345 kg	David James	23 May 2021	WWA State Masters & Open	Balcatta, Australia	
102 kg
Snatch	155 kg	Standard				
Clean & Jerk	191 kg	Sam Thorne	3 December 2022	NBWA Christmas Club Competition	Zillmere, Australia	
Total	336 kg	Sam Thorne	3 December 2022	NBWA Christmas Club Competition	Zillmere, Australia	
109 kg
Snatch	167 kg	Matthew Lydement	8 May 2021	Cougars DK Duo Competition	Chandler, Australia	
Clean & Jerk	202 kg	Jackson Roberts-Young	3 August 2022	Commonwealth Games	Marston Green, United Kingdom	
Total	356 kg	Matthew Lydement	11 October 2020	Queensland Championships	Chandler, Australia	
+109 kg
Snatch	170 kg	Suamili Nanai	1 May 2022	WWA U15/U17 States & May Open	Balcatta, Australia	
Clean & Jerk	210 kg	Suamili Nanai	28 November 2021	Australian Championships		
Total	380 kg	Suamili Nanai	1 May 2022	WWA U15/U17 States & May Open	Balcatta, Australia	

=== Men (1998–2018) ===
Event	Record	Athlete	Date	Meet	Place	Ref
–56 kg
Snatch	110 kg	Mehmet Yagci	23 February 2002	New South Wales Open	Goulburn, Australia	
Clean & Jerk	137 kg	Johnny Nguyen	23 March 1998	Commonwealth & Oceania Championships	Nauru	
Total	245 kg	Mehmet Yagci	23 February 2002	New South Wales Open	Goulburn, Australia	
–62 kg
Snatch	128 kg	Yurik Sarkisyan	15 August 1999	Australian Championships	Australia	
Clean & Jerk	165 kg	Yurik Sarkisyan	15 August 1999	Australian Championships	Australia	
Total	292 kg	Yurik Sarkisyan	15 August 1999	Australian Championships	Australia	
–69 kg
Snatch	131 kg	François Etoundi	15 May 2009	Oceania Championships	Darwin, Australia	
Clean & Jerk	171 kg	Ben Turner	10 September 2005	QWA League	Toowoomba, Australia	
Total	300 kg	Yurik Sarkisyan	14 May 2000	Armenian Championships	Armenia	
–77 kg
Snatch	155 kg	Sergo Chakhoyan	20 June 1999	Victoria Championships	Hawthorn, Australia	
Clean & Jerk	187 kg	Sergo Chakhoyan	17 September 1998	Commonwealth Games	Kuala Lumpur, Malaysia	
Total	327 kg	Sergo Chakhoyan	17 September 1998	Commonwealth Games	Kuala Lumpur, Malaysia	
–85 kg
Snatch	182 kg OC	Sergo Chakhoyan	28 September 2003	Russian Grand Prix	Moscow, Russia	
Clean & Jerk	210 kg OC	Sergo Chakhoyan	28 September 2003	Russian Grand Prix	Moscow, Russia	
Total	392 kg OC	Sergo Chakhoyan	28 September 2003	Russian Grand Prix	Moscow, Russia	
–94 kg
Snatch	182 kg OC	Aleksan Karapetyan	9 November 2001	World Championships	Antalya, Turkey	
Clean & Jerk	210 kg OC	Aleksan Karapetyan	9 November 2001	World Championships	Antalya, Turkey	
Total	392 kg OC	Aleksan Karapetyan	9 November 2001	World Championships	Antalya, Turkey	
–105 kg
Snatch	175 kg OC	Aleksan Karapetyan	30 October 2004	Mermet Cup	Hawthorn, Australia	
Clean & Jerk	210 kg OC	Aleksan Karapetyan	17 March 2002	Mermet Cup	Hawthorn, Australia	
Total	377 kg OC	Aleksan Karapetyan	17 March 2002	Mermet Cup	Hawthorn, Australia	
+105 kg
Snatch	182 kg	Corran Hocking	7 June 2008	Australian Olympic Trials	Australia	
Clean & Jerk	227 kg	Chris Rae	16 April 2004	April Open SASI	Australia	
Total	405 kg	Chris Rae	16 April 2004	April Open SASI	Australia	

=== Women (2025–2026) ===
Event	Record	Athlete	Date	Meet	Place	Ref
48 kg
Snatch	70 kg	Chloe Perkins	15 March 2026		Nundah, Australia	
Clean & Jerk	87 kg	Chloe Perkins	27 April 2026	Oceania Junior Championships	Apia, Samoa	
Total	157 kg	Chloe Perkins	27 April 2026	Oceania Junior Championships	Apia, Samoa	
58 kg
Snatch	100 kg	Kiana Elliott	26 August 2025	Commonwealth Championships	Ahmedabad, India	
Clean & Jerk	112 kg	Kiana Elliott	14 June 2025	Precision Weightlifting Club Open	Adelaide, Australia	
Total	212 kg	Kiana Elliott	26 August 2025	Commonwealth Championships	Ahmedabad, India	
63 kg
Snatch	98 kg	Kiana Elliott	3 July 2025	Pacific Mini Games	Meyuns, Palau	
Clean & Jerk	118 kg	Zoe Pukekura	13 April 2025	Oceania Cup	Hawthorn, Australia	
Total	213 kg	Kiana Elliott	3 July 2025	Pacific Mini Games	Meyuns, Palau	

=== Women (2018–2025) ===
Event	Record	Athlete	Date	Meet	Place	Ref
45 kg
Snatch	58 kg	Standard				
Clean & Jerk	72 kg	Standard				
Total	130 kg	Standard				
49 kg
Snatch	68 kg	Michaela Warwick	7 December 2024	HWC Championships	Hawthorn, Australia	
Clean & Jerk	84 kg	Alyce Stephenson	27 April 2019	Arafura Games	Darwin, Australia	
Total	149 kg	Jianne Gungon	7 December 2024	HWC Championships	Hawthorn, Australia	
55 kg
Snatch	79 kg	Erika Yamasaki	21 December 2019	Qatar Cup	Doha, Qatar	
Clean & Jerk	104 kg	Brenna Kean	1 June 2024	OWF International Elite Tournament	Melbourne, Australia	
Total	181 kg	Erika Yamasaki	21 December 2019	Qatar Cup	Doha, Qatar	
59 kg
Snatch	97 kg	Kiana Elliott	21 February 2024	Oceania Championships	Auckland, New Zealand	
Clean & Jerk	114 kg	Kiana Elliott	21 February 2024	Oceania Championships	Auckland, New Zealand	
Total	211 kg	Kiana Elliott	21 February 2024	Oceania Championships	Auckland, New Zealand	
64 kg
Snatch	101 kg	Kiana Elliott	27 July 2021	Olympic Games	Tokyo, Japan	
Clean & Jerk	120 kg	Sarah Cochrane	23 September 2021	Oceania Championships		
Total	220 kg	Sarah Cochrane	23 September 2021	Oceania Championships		
71 kg
Snatch	101 kg	Sarah Cochrane	20 May 2023	Queensland Championships	Townsville, Australia	
Clean & Jerk	122 kg	Jacqueline Nichele	14 July 2023	Commonwealth Championships	Greater Noida, India	
Total	221 kg	Sarah Cochrane	20 May 2023	Queensland Championships	Townsville, Australia	
76 kg
Snatch	102 kg	Isabel Lorenzi	31 January 2021	Shred Barbell Open Competition	Sydney, Australia	
Clean & Jerk	126 kg	Olivia Kelly	8 July 2023		Ipswich, Australia	
Total	221 kg	Olivia Kelly	8 July 2023		Ipswich, Australia	
81 kg
Snatch	118 kg	Eileen Cikamatana	18 May 2019	ACT vs NSW	Sydney, Australia	
Clean & Jerk	150 kg	Eileen Cikamatana	18 May 2019	ACT vs NSW	Sydney, Australia	
Total	268 kg	Eileen Cikamatana	18 May 2019	ACT vs NSW	Sydney, Australia	
87 kg
Snatch	120 kg	Eileen Cikamatana	20 March 2021		Melbourne, Australia	
Clean & Jerk	155 kg	Eileen Cikamatana	16 August 2019	Australian U20 & U23 Championships	Sydney, Australia	
Total	272 kg	Eileen Cikamatana	20 March 2021		Melbourne, Australia	
+87 kg
Snatch	110 kg	Charisma Amoe-Tarrant	16 August 2019	Australian U20 & U23 Championships	Sydney, Australia	
Clean & Jerk	152 kg	Charisma Amoe-Tarrant	23 December 2019	Qatar Cup	Doha, Qatar	
Total	262 kg	Charisma Amoe-Tarrant	23 December 2019	Qatar Cup	Doha, Qatar	

=== Women (1998–2018) ===
Event	Record	Athlete	Date	Meet	Place	Ref
–48 kg
Snatch	73 kg	Erika Yamasaki	11 October 2010	Commonwealth Games	Delhi, India	
Clean & Jerk	91 kg	Vivian Lee	11 October 2010	Commonwealth Games	Delhi, India	
Total	160 kg	Vivian Lee	11 October 2010	Commonwealth Games	Delhi, India	
–53 kg
Snatch	83 kg	Erika Ropati-Frost	20 November 2015	World Championships	Houston, United States	
Clean & Jerk	106 kg	Erika Ropati-Frost	28 August 2015	Australian Championships	Melbourne, Australia	
Total	188 kg	Erika Ropati-Frost	28 August 2015	Australian Championships	Melbourne, Australia	
–58 kg
Snatch	96 kg OC	Seen Lee	20 December 2008	Hawthorn Club Championships	Hawthorn, Australia	
Clean & Jerk	114 kg	Tia-Clair Toomey	6 April 2018	Commonwealth Games	Gold Coast, Australia	
Total	208 kg OC	Seen Lee	20 December 2008	Hawthorn Club Championships	Hawthorn, Australia	
–63 kg
Snatch	95 kg OC	Kiana Elliott	29 June 2016	World Junior Championships	Tbilisi, Georgia	
Clean & Jerk	111 kg	Seen Lee	6 September 2017	Commonwealth & Oceania Championships	Gold Coast, Australia	
Total	204 kg OC	Kiana Elliott	29 June 2016	World Junior Championships	Tbilisi, Georgia	
–69 kg
Snatch	100 kg OC	Michelle Kettner	25 March 2000	International Challenge	Sydney, Australia	
Clean & Jerk	122 kg OC	Michelle Kettner	19 September 2000	Olympic Games	Sydney, Australia	
Total	222 kg OC	Michelle Kettner	19 September 2000	Olympic Games	Sydney, Australia	
–75 kg
Snatch	99 kg	Jenna Myers	20 March 2016	Australian International	Brisbane, Australia	
Clean & Jerk	120 kg	Caroline Pileggi	10 March 2000		Nauru	
Total	215 kg	Deborah Lovely	26 June 2004	Australian Olympic Trials	Hawthorn, Australia	
–90 kg
Snatch	113 kg	Record Standard				
Clean & Jerk	140 kg	Record Standard				
Total	252 kg	Record Standard				
+90 kg
Snatch	113 kg	Record Standard				
Clean & Jerk	140 kg	Record Standard				
Total	252 kg	Record Standard				
