= 2025 Oceania Weightlifting Championships =

Weightlifting at the 2025 Pacific Mini Games
- Location: Meyuns, Palau
- Dates: 2-5 July 2025

The 2025 Oceania Weightlifting Championships, celebrated at the 2025 Pacific Mini Games in Palau, was held on 2–5 July 2025 at the Sports Complex Meyuns in Meyuns.

== Competition schedule ==
Schedule
Date	July 2	July 3	July 4	July 5
Men's 60kg	F			
Men's 65kg	F			
Men's 71kg		F		
Men's 79kg		F		
Men's 88kg			F	
Men's 94kg			F	
Men's 110kg			F	
Men's 110+kg				F
Women's 48kg	F			
Women's 53kg	F			
Women's 58kg	F			
Women's 63kg		F		
Women's 69kg		F		
Women's 77kg			F	
Women's 86kg			F	
Women's 86+kg				F

== Medal summary ==
=== Medal table ===
* Host nation (Palau)

Rank	Nation	Gold	Silver	Bronze	Total
1	Samoa	15	8	7	30
2	Australia	15	6	9	30
3	Papua New Guinea	5	2	7	14
4	Fiji	4	3	4	11
5	Nauru	3	20	3	26
6	Kiribati	3	0	1	4
7	New Zealand	2	3	4	9
8	Guam	1	2	0	3
9	Vanuatu	0	3	0	3
10	Northern Mariana Islands	0	1	3	4
11	Marshall Islands	0	0	3	3
11	Tahiti	0	0	3	3
13	Palau*	0	0	2	2
13	Tuvalu	0	0	2	2
Totals (14 entries)		48	48	48	144

=== Men's ===
Event	Gold		Silver		Bronze	
60 kg snatch	Shadrach Cain (NRU)	102 kg	Johannes Adam (NRU)	101 kg	Reinataake Takenteiti (KIR)	96 kg
60 kg clean & jerk	Shadrach Cain (NRU)	130 kg	Johannes Adam (NRU)	128 kg	Blaine Patris (PLW)	121 kg
60 kg total	Shadrach Cain (NRU)	232 kg	Johannes Adam (NRU)	229 kg	Blaine Patris (PLW)	216 kg
65 kg snatch	Morea Baru (PNG)	117 kg	Ditto Ika (NRU)	116 kg	Falevaa Tafi (SAM)	105 kg
65 kg clean & jerk	Morea Baru (PNG)	156 kg	Ditto Ika (NRU)	152 kg	Lowell Cristobal (NMI)	141 kg
65 kg total	Morea Baru (PNG)	273 kg	Ditto Ika (NRU)	268 kg	Lowell Cristobal (NMI)	244 kg
71 kg snatch	John Tafi (SAM)	136 kg	Poama Qaqa (FIJ)	126 kg	Manuila Raobu (TUV)	125 kg
71 kg clean & jerk	John Tafi (SAM)	169 kg	Ezekiel Moses (NRU)	168 kg	Poama Qaqa (FIJ)	150 kg
71 kg total	John Tafi (SAM)	305 kg	Poama Qaqa (FIJ)	276 kg	Manuila Raobu (TUV)	274 kg
79 kg snatch	Ruben Katoatau (KIR)	126 kg	Kyle Itsimaera (NRU)	125 kg	Spartan Teimitsi (NRU)	117 kg
79 kg clean & jerk	Ruben Katoatau (KIR)	157 kg	Kyle Itsimaera (NRU)	156 kg	Daniel Shaw (FIJ)	155 kg
79 kg total	Ruben Katoatau (KIR)	283 kg	Kyle Itsimaera (NRU)	281 kg	Daniel Shaw (FIJ)	270 kg
88 kg snatch	Nehemiah Elder (FIJ)	155 kg	Marcincy Cook (NRU)	128 kg	Teihoarii Buchin (TAH)	116 kg
88 kg clean & jerk	Nehemiah Elder (FIJ)	175 kg	Marcincy Cook (NRU)	160 kg	Teihoarii Buchin (TAH)	146 kg
88 kg total	Nehemiah Elder (FIJ)	330 kg	Marcincy Cook (NRU)	288 kg	Teihoarii Buchin (TAH)	262 kg
94 kg snatch	Emmanuel Ulimasao (SAM)	139 kg	Uea Detudamo (NRU)	138 kg	Noah Milford (AUS)	131 kg
94 kg clean & jerk	Emmanuel Ulimasao (SAM)	180 kg	Noah Milford (AUS)	173 kg	Uea Detudamo (NRU)	165 kg
94 kg total	Emmanuel Ulimasao (SAM)	319 kg	Noah Milford (AUS)	304 kg	Uea Detudamo (NRU)	303 kg
110 kg snatch	Taniela Rainibogi (FIJ)	160 kg	Jack Opeloge (SAM)	158 kg	Jackson R-Y (AUS)	145 kg
110 kg clean & jerk	Jack Opeloge (SAM)	201 kg	Jackson R-Y (AUS)	197 kg	Taniela Rainibogi (FIJ)	196 kg
110 kg total	Jack Opeloge (SAM)	359 kg	Taniela Rainibogi (FIJ)	356 kg	Jackson R-Y (AUS)	342 kg
+110 kg snatch	Sanele Mao (SAM)	161 kg	David Liti (NZL)	160 kg	Joey Colisao (NMI)	359 kg
+110 kg c&j	David Liti (NZL)	175 kg	Steven Kari (PNG)	170 kg	Jason Limes (NMI)	170 kg
+110 kg total	David Liti (NZL)	335 kg	Joey Colisao (NMI)	305 kg	Steven Kari (PNG)	300 kg

=== Women's ===
Event	Gold		Silver		Bronze	
48 kg snatch	Jianne Gungon (AUS)	68 kg	Jo-beth Deireragea (NRU)	67 kg	Thelma Toua (PNG)	61 kg
48 kg clean & jerk	Jianne Gungon (AUS)	84 kg	Jo-beth Deireragea (NRU)	83 kg	Thelma Toua (PNG)	81 kg
48 kg total	Jianne Gungon (AUS)	152 kg	Jo-beth Deireragea (NRU)	150 kg	Thelma Toua (PNG)	142 kg
53 kg snatch	Chloe Santos (GUM)	71 kg	Dika Toua (PNG)	69 kg	Idau Vagi (PNG)	65 kg
53 kg clean & jerk	Dika Toua (PNG)	91 kg	Chloe Santos (GUM)	80 kg	Idau Vagi (PNG)	78 kg
53 kg total	Dika Toua (PNG)	160 kg	Chloe Santos (GUM)	151 kg	Idau Vagi (PNG)	143 kg
58 kg snatch	Tessa Rim (AUS)	83 kg	Brenna Kean (AUS)	79 kg	Anoni Taulua (SAM)	76 kg
58 kg clean & jerk	Brenna Kean (AUS)	108 kg	Tessa Rim (AUS)	100 kg	Anoni Taulua (SAM)	93 kg
58 kg total	Brenna Kean (AUS)	187 kg	Tessa Rim (AUS)	183 kg	Anoni Taulua (SAM)	169 kg
63 kg snatch	Kiana Elliott (AUS)	98 kg	Femily-Crystie Notte (NRU)	90 kg	Zoe De Gersigny (AUS)	89 kg
63 kg clean & jerk	Kiana Elliott (AUS)	115 kg	Femily-Crystie Notte (NRU)	111 kg	Zoe De Gersigny (AUS)	108 kg
63 kg total	Kiana Elliott (AUS)	213 kg	Femily-Crystie Notte (NRU)	201 kg	Zoe De Gersigny (AUS)	197 kg
69 kg snatch	Nya Hayman (AUS)	93 kg	Sefulu Seuao (SAM)	88 kg	Sienna Fesolai (NZL)	87 kg
69 kg clean & jerk	Nya Hayman (AUS)	116 kg	Sienna Fesolai (NZL)	110 kg	Sefulu Seuao (SAM)	104 kg
69 kg total	Nya Hayman (AUS)	209 kg	Sienna Fesolai (NZL)	197 kg	Sefulu Seuao (SAM)	192 kg
77 kg snatch	Seine Stowers (SAM)	99 kg	Avatu Opeloge (SAM)	98 kg	Olivia Shelton (AUS)	97 kg
77 kg clean & jerk	Seine Stowers (SAM)	128 kg	Avatu Opeloge (SAM)	127 kg	Olivia Shelton (AUS)	123 kg
77 kg total	Seine Stowers (SAM)	227 kg	Avatu Opeloge (SAM)	225 kg	Olivia Shelton (AUS)	220 kg
86 kg snatch	Eileen Cikamatana (AUS)	115 kg	Ajah Pritchard-Lolo (VAN)	90 kg	Merean Atantaake (MHL)	80 kg
86 kg clean & jerk	Eileen Cikamatana (AUS)	140 kg	Ajah Pritchard-Lolo (VAN)	110 kg	Merean Atantaake (MHL)	105 kg
86 kg total	Eileen Cikamatana (AUS)	255 kg	Ajah Pritchard-Lolo (VAN)	200 kg	Merean Atantaake (MHL)	185 kg
+86 kg snatch	Iuniarra Sipaia (SAM)	106 kg	Lesila Fiapule (SAM)	105 kg	Tui-Alofa Patolo (NZL)	104 kg
+86 kg clean & jerk	Iuniarra Sipaia (SAM)	145 kg	Lesila Fiapule (SAM)	134 kg	Judy Soloai (NZL)	132 kg
+86 kg total	Iuniarra Sipaia (SAM)	251 kg	Lesila Fiapule (SAM)	239 kg	Judy Soloai (NZL)	225 kg

== See also ==
- Weightlifting at the Pacific Games
