= Weightlifting at the 2022 Pacific Mini Games =

Sporting competition

- Venue: Marianas High School Gymnasium
- Location: Saipan, Northern Mariana Islands
- Dates: 20–23 June
- Competitors: 131 from 15 nations

Weightlifting was one of the sports contested at the 2022 Pacific Mini Games, held in Saipan, Northern Mariana Islands. The competition took place from 20 to 23 June 2022, spread across twenty weight classes (ten per gender).

The event was also designated the 2022 Oceania Senior Weightlifting Championships.

== Competition schedule ==
The competition schedule is as follows:

Date Event	Mon 20	Tue 21	Wed 22	Thu 23
Men's
55 kg	F			
61 kg	F			
67 kg		F		
73 kg		F		
81 kg		F		
89 kg			F	
96 kg			F	
102 kg				F
109 kg				F
+109 kg				F
Women's
45 kg	F			
49 kg	F			
55 kg	F			
59 kg		F		
64 kg		F		
71 kg			F	
76 kg			F	
81 kg			F	
87 kg				F
+87 kg				F

== Participating nations ==
As of 1 June 2022, fifteen countries and territories have confirmed their participation in the games.

Pacific Games Associations
- Australia ()
- Cook Islands ()
- Fiji ()
- Guam ()
- Kiribati ()
- Nauru ()
- New Caledonia ()
- Northern Mariana Islands () (Host)
- Papua New Guinea ()
- Samoa ()
- Solomon Islands ()
- Tahiti ()
- Tonga ()
- Tuvalu ()
- Vanuatu ()

== Medal summary ==
=== Medal table ===
Medals are awarded for the Snatch, the Clean & Jerk, and the Total in accordance with the Pacific Games Councils Charter; Protocol 26. Four or more contestants: Gold Silver and Bronze; three contestants: Gold and Silver only; two contestants: Gold only; one contestant: no event, no medal.

* Host nation (Northern Mariana Islands)

Rank	Nation	Gold	Silver	Bronze	Total
1	Northern Mariana Islands (NMI)*	11	9	3	23
2	Australia (AUS)	11	1	0	12
3	Papua New Guinea (PNG)	7	4	1	12
4	Guam (GUM)	7	0	9	16
5	Samoa (SAM)	6	3	3	12
6	Solomon Islands (SOL)	3	13	2	18
7	Kiribati (KIR)	3	0	0	3
7	Palau (PLW)	3	0	0	3
7	Tonga (TGA)	3	0	0	3
10	Tuvalu (TUV)	2	0	0	2
11	Fiji (FIJ)	1	10	9	20
12	Tahiti (TAH)	0	4	10	14
13	New Caledonia (NCL)	0	3	3	6
14	Vanuatu (VAN)	0	1	2	3
15	Cook Islands (COK)	0	0	3	3
Totals (15 entries)		57	48	45	150

=== Men's results ===
Event	Gold		Silver		Bronze	
55 kg
Snatch	Raymond Hipol Santos (NMI)	92 kg	Philip Masi (SOL)	91 kg	Eroni Talemanigau Vuratu (FIJ)	82 kg
Clean & jerk	Raymond Hipol Santos (NMI)	115 kg	Philip Masi (SOL)	108 kg	Eroni Talemanigau Vuratu (FIJ)	105 kg
Total	Raymond Hipol Santos (NMI)	207 kg	Philip Masi (SOL)	199 kg	Eroni Talemanigau Vuratu (FIJ)	187 kg
61 kg
Snatch	Morea Baru (PNG)	110 kg	Brown Ramohaka (SOL)	96 kg	Harold Aranda (GUM)	90 kg
Clean & jerk	Morea Baru (PNG)	151 kg GR	Brown Ramohaka (SOL)	132 kg	Harold Aranda (GUM)	120 kg
Total	Morea Baru (PNG)	261 kg	Brown Ramohaka (SOL)	228 kg	Harold Aranda (GUM)	210 kg
67 kg
Snatch	Ruben Katoatau (KIR)	110 kg	Stan Eddie Donga (SOL)	105 kg	Krysthian Villanueava (GUM)	98 kg
Clean & jerk	Ruben Katoatau (KIR)	135 kg	Leowell Cristobal (NMI)	125 kg	Krysthian Villanueava (GUM)	123 kg
Total	Ruben Katoatau (KIR)	245 kg	Stan Eddie Donga (SOL)	225 kg	Krysthian Villanueava (GUM)	221 kg
73 kg
Snatch	Manuila Raobu (TUV)	115 kg	Two entrants, only gold awarded			
Clean & jerk	David Bautista (GUM)	140 kg	Two entrants, only gold awarded			
Total	Manuila Raobu (TUV)	253 kg	Two entrants, only gold awarded			
81 kg
Snatch	Stevick Patris (PLW)	121 kg	Patrick Veireyaki (FIJ)	120 kg	Sylvain Duclos (NCL)	107 kg
Clean & jerk	Stevick Patris (PLW)	160 kg	Patrick Veireyaki (FIJ)	152 kg	Sylvain Duclos (NCL)	147 kg
Total	Stevick Patris (PLW)	281 kg	Patrick Veireyaki (FIJ)	272 kg	Sylvain Duclos (NCL)	254 kg
89 kg
Snatch	Beau Garrett (AUS)	130 kg	Leonardo Apelo (NMI)	124 kg	Matahi Tahiaipuoho (TAH)	122 kg
Clean & jerk	Beau Garrett (AUS)	172 kg	Leonardo Apelo (NMI)	157 kg	Matahi Tahiaipuoho (TAH)	151 kg
Total	Beau Garrett (AUS)	302 kg	Leonardo Apelo (NMI)	281 kg	Matahi Tahiaipuoho (TAH)	273 kg
96 kg
Snatch	Uaealesi Funaki (TGA)	121 kg	Charlie Lolohea (FIJ)	115 kg	Steven Tehihira (TAH)	113 kg
Clean & jerk	Uaealesi Funaki (TGA)	170 kg	Charlie Lolohea (FIJ)	153 kg	Steven Tehihira (TAH)	145 kg
Total	Uaealesi Funaki (TGA)	291 kg	Charlie Lolohea (FIJ)	268 kg	Steven Tehihira (TAH)	258 kg
102 kg
Snatch	Sepa Simoi (PNG)	122 kg	Thomas Wilbur (VAN)	120 kg	Angel San Nicolas (NMI)	119 kg
Clean & jerk	Angel San Nicolas (NMI)	160 kg	Sepa Simoi (PNG)	153 kg	Thomas Wilbur (VAN)	151 kg
Total	Angel San Nicolas (NMI)	279 kg	Sepa Simoi (PNG)	275 kg	Thomas Wilbur (VAN)	271 kg
109 kg
Snatch	David Barnhouse (NMI)	116 kg	Two entrants, only gold awarded			
Clean & jerk	David Barnhouse (NMI)	136 kg	Two entrants, only gold awarded			
Total	David Barnhouse (NMI)	252 kg	Two entrants, only gold awarded			
+109 kg
Snatch	Joey Cosilao (NMI)	118 kg	Eriatara Ratia (TAH)	115 kg	Jason Limes (NMI)	110 kg
Clean & jerk	Jason Limes (NMI)	150 kg	Joey Cosilao (NMI)	141 kg	Eriatara Ratia (TAH)	140 kg
Total	Jason Limes (NMI)	260 kg	Joey Cosilao (NMI)	259 kg	Eriatara Ratia (TAH)	255 kg

=== Women's results ===
Event	Gold		Silver		Bronze	
45 kg
Snatch	Nicola Lagatao (GUM)	57 kg	Two entrants, only gold awarded			
Clean & jerk	Nicola Lagatao (GUM)	74 kg	Two entrants, only gold awarded			
Total	Nicola Lagatao (GUM)	131 kg	Two entrants, only gold awarded			
49 kg
Snatch	Dika Toua (PNG)	74 kg	Rowena Eddie Donga (SOL)	62 kg	Thelma Toua (PNG)	61 kg
Clean & jerk	Dika Toua (PNG)	96 kg GR	Thelma Toua (PNG)	80 kg	Rowena Eddie Donga (SOL)	75 kg
Total	Dika Toua (PNG)	170 kg	Thelma Toua (PNG)	141 kg	Rowena Eddie Donga (SOL)	137 kg
55 kg
Snatch	Jenly Tegu Wini (SOL)	84 kg GR	Prescellia Piotrowsky (NCL)	69 kg	Erika Camacho (GUM)	60 kg
Clean & jerk	Jenly Tegu Wini (SOL)	110 kg GR	Prescellia Piotrowsky (NCL)	80 kg	Erika Camacho (GUM)	75 kg
Total	Jenly Tegu Wini (SOL)	194 kg GR	Prescellia Piotrowsky (NCL)	149 kg	Erika Camacho (GUM)	135 kg
59 kg
Snatch	Natalie Setiadji (AUS)	75 kg	Mary Kini Lifu (SOL)	67 kg	Aluwesi Aditaroleva (FIJ)	67 kg
Clean & jerk	Natalie Setiadji (AUS)	96 kg	Mary Kini Lifu (SOL)	86 kg	Aluwesi Aditaroleva (FIJ)	85 kg
Total	Natalie Setiadji (AUS)	171 kg	Mary Kini Lifu (SOL)	153 kg	Aluwesi Aditaroleva (FIJ)	152 kg
64 kg
Snatch	Jacinta Sumagaysay (GUM)	70 kg	Vanina Teheipuarii (TAH)	65 kg	Three entrants, only gold and silver awarded	
Clean & jerk	Jacinta Sumagaysay (GUM)	100 kg	Shirmara Wini (SOL)	76 kg	Three entrants, only gold and silver awarded	
Total	Jacinta Sumagaysay (GUM)	170 kg	Vanina Teheipuarii (TAH)	140 kg	Three entrants, only gold and silver awarded	
71 kg
Snatch	Darcy Kay (AUS)	86 kg	Storm Wolff (TAH)	70 kg	Miriama Taletawa (FIJ)	67 kg
Clean & jerk	Darcy Kay (AUS)	110 kg	Miriama Taletawa (FIJ)	92 kg	Storm Wolff (TAH)	85 kg
Total	Darcy Kay (AUS)	196 kg	Miriama Taletawa (FIJ)	159 kg	Storm Wolff (TAH)	155 kg
76 kg
Snatch	Apolonia Vaivai (FIJ)	95 kg	Olivia Kelly (AUS)	93 kg	Avatu Opeloge (SAM)	78 kg
Clean & jerk	Olivia Kelly (AUS)	118 kg	Apolonia Vaivai (FIJ)	111 kg	Avatu Opeloge (SAM)	104 kg
Total	Olivia Kelly (AUS)	211 kg	Apolonia Vaivai (FIJ)	206 kg	Avatu Opeloge (SAM)	182 kg
81 kg
Snatch	Faustina Opeloge (SAM)	90 kg	Antonette Labausa (NMI)	76 kg	Riella Ann Ichiuo (NMI)	61 kg
Clean & jerk	Faustina Opeloge (SAM)	107 kg	Antonette Labausa (NMI)	97 kg	Vikatoria Taka (FIJ)	81 kg
Total	Faustina Opeloge (SAM)	197 kg	Antonette Labausa (NMI)	173 kg	Vikatoria Taka (FIJ)	141 kg
87 kg
Snatch	One entrant, no medals awarded					
Clean & jerk	One entrant, no medals awarded					
Total	One entrant, no medals awarded					
+87 kg
Snatch	Lesila Fiapule (SAM)	107 kg	Iuniarra Sipaia (SAM)	104 kg	Manine Lynch (COK)	90 kg
Clean & jerk	Iuniarra Sipaia (SAM)	157 kg GR	Lesila Fiapule (SAM)	145 kg	Manine Lynch (COK)	120 kg
Total	Iuniarra Sipaia (SAM)	261 kg GR	Lesila Fiapule (SAM)	252 kg	Manine Lynch (COK)	210 kg

== Medal table (Oceania Championships) ==
Medals were awarded for totals only and were not contingent on minimum participation limits.

* Host nation (Northern Mariana Islands)

Rank	Nation	Gold	Silver	Bronze	Total
1	Australia	5	0	0	5
2	Northern Mariana Islands*	4	3	0	7
3	Papua New Guinea	2	2	0	4
4	Guam	2	1	3	6
5	Samoa	2	0	2	4
6	Solomon Islands	1	4	2	7
7	Kiribati	1	0	0	1
7	Palau	1	0	0	1
7	Tonga	1	0	0	1
7	Tuvalu	1	0	0	1
11	Fiji	0	5	3	8
12	French Polynesia	0	1	5	6
13	New Caledonia	0	1	1	2
14	Cook Islands	0	1	0	1
14	Vanuatu	0	1	0	1
Totals (15 entries)		20	19	16	55

== Medal summary (Oceania Championships) ==
=== Men ===
Event	Gold		Silver		Bronze	
55 kg	Raymond Hipol Santos; Northern Mariana Islands	207 kg	Philip Masi; Solomon Islands	199 kg	Eroni Talemanigau Vuratu; Fiji	187 kg
61 kg	Morea Baru; Papua New Guinea	262 kg	Brown Ramohaka; Solomon Islands	228 kg	Harold Aranda; Guam	210 kg
67 kg	Ruben Katoatau; Kiribati	245 kg	Stan Eddie Donga; Solomon Islands	225 kg	Krysthian Villanueava; Guam	221 kg
73 kg	Manuila Raobu; Tuvalu	253 kg	David Bautista; Guam	245 kg	Not awarded (lack of entries)	
81 kg	Stevick Patris; Palau	281 kg	Patrick Veireyaki; Fiji	272 kg	Sylvain Duclos; New Caledonia	254 kg
89 kg	Beau Garrett; Australia	302 kg	Leonardo Apelo; Northern Mariana Islands	281 kg	Matahi Tahiaipuoho; Tahiti	273 kg
96 kg	Uaealesi Funaki; Tonga	291 kg	Charlie Lolohea; Fiji	268 kg	Steven Tehihira; Tahiti	258 kg
102 kg	Angel San Nicolas; Northern Mariana Islands	279 kg	Thomas Wilbur; Vanuatu	271 kg	Tefatanui Metua; Tahiti	240 kg
109 kg	David Barnhouse; Northern Mariana Islands	252 kg	Timothy Vakaruivalu; Fiji	247 kg	Not awarded (lack of entries)	
+109 kg	Jason Limes; Northern Mariana Islands	260 kg	Joey Cosilao; Northern Mariana Islands	259 kg	Eriatara Ratia; Tahiti	255 kg

=== Women ===
Event	Gold		Silver		Bronze	
45 kg	Nicola Lagatao; Guam	131 kg	Idau Vagi; Papua New Guinea	105 kg	Not awarded (lack of entries)	
49 kg	Dika Toua; Papua New Guinea	170 kg	Thelma Toua; Papua New Guinea	141 kg	Rowena Eddie Donga; Solomon Islands	137 kg
55 kg	Jenly Tegu Wini; Solomon Islands	194 kg	Prescellia Piotrowsky; New Caledonia	149 kg	Erika Camacho; Guam	135 kg
59 kg	Natalie Setiadji; Australia	171 kg	Mary Kini Lifu; Solomon Islands	153 kg	Aluwesi Aditaroleva; Fiji	152 kg
64 kg	Jacinta Sumagaysay; Guam	170 kg	Vanina Teheipuarii; Tahiti	140 kg	Shirmara Wini; Solomon Islands	139 kg
71 kg	Darcy Kay; Australia	196 kg	Miriama Taletawa; Fiji	159 kg	Storm Wolff; Tahiti	155 kg
76 kg	Olivia Kelly; Australia	211 kg	Apolonia Vaivai; Fiji	206 kg	Avatu Opeloge; Samoa	182 kg
81 kg	Faustina Opeloge; Samoa	197 kg	Antonette Labausa; Northern Mariana Islands	173 kg	Vikatoria Taka; Fiji	141 kg
87 kg	Eileen Cikamatana; Australia	250 kg	Not awarded (lack of entries)			
+87 kg	Iuniarra Sipaia; Samoa	261 kg	Manine Lynch; Cook Islands	210 kg	Imoasina Pelenato; Samoa	198 kg

== See also ==
- Weightlifting at the Pacific Games
