= Ngerekebesang =

Island

Coordinates: 7°21′14″N 134°27′02″E

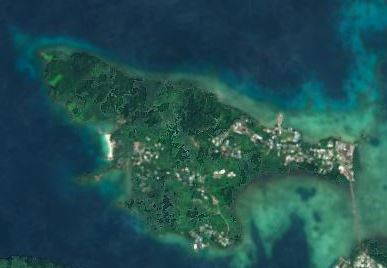
Satellite image of Ngerekebesang

Ngerekebesang Island (alternative names: Arakabesan) is an island in the state of Koror, Palau, where the office of the President of Palau was located until the capital was moved to Ngerulmud in October 2006. There are three towns: Meyuns, Echang and Ngerekebesang Hamlet.

Satellite office of the president is located in Meuyns.

== Roads ==
Didall Causeway
Ngerkebesang Island and the Island of Koror are connected by a causeway "Didall Causeway" which was constructed during the period when Palau was under Japanese rule. The largest hospital in Palau "Belau National Hospital" is located close to the connection point in Meyuns.

The arterial road in Ngerekebesang
Palau's arterial road connect multiple islands via causeways, with the Didar Causeway being one such link. Within Ngerekebesang Island, the arterial road extends to the west coast boat ramp in Ngerekebesang Hamlet. In 2006, the arterial roads were improved under a Japanese Grant Aid Program. And, another project was conducted until 2009 to secure safe and smooth transportation in Palau Metropolitan Area by improving parts of the arterial roads in Koror and Airai area.

== Resort industry ==
Palau Pacific Resort
Tokyu Land has advanced the development of the Palau Pacific Resort while exercising the utmost consideration for the natural environment along the west coast of Ngerekebesang. The operating company for this project, Pacific Islands Development Corporation, was established in Palau in December 1973. Following land acquisition and development work, the Palau Pacific Resort opened in 1984. Japanese embassy is located within Palau Pacific Resort.
