= Katoatau =

Katoatau is an Oceanian surname. Notable people with the surname include:

- David Katoatau (born 1984), Kiribati weightlifter
- Ruben Katoatau (born 1997), Kiribati weightlifter, brother of David
