= Uaealesi Funaki =

Tongan-New Zealander weightlifter

Personal information
- Born: 1998 (age 27–28) Ōtāhuhu, New Zealand
- Height: 172 cm (5 ft 8 in)

Sport
- Country: Tonga
- Sport: Weightlifting
Medal record
Men's weightlifting
Representing Tonga
Pacific Mini Games
Gold medal – first place	2022 saipan	96kg snatch
Gold medal – first place	2022 saipan	96kg clean & jerk
Gold medal – first place	2022 saipan	96kg total
Oceania Championships
Gold medal – first place	2022 saipan	96kg

Uaealesi Funaki (born 1998) is a Tongan New Zealander weightlifter who has represented New Zealand at the Junior World Weightlifting Championships and Tonga at the Pacific Mini Games.

Funake was born in the Auckland suburb of Ōtāhuhu and grew up in Māngere. He was educated at Southern Cross College. He began weightlifting at age 15 to improve his rugby performance, and later represented New Zealand at the 2015 Junior World Weightlifting Championships in Port Moresby, Papua New Guinea, winning silver in the under 85 kg class. In 2018, he represented New Zealand at the Junior World Weightlifting Championships in Tashkent, Uzbekistan.

At the 2022 Pacific Mini Games in Saipan, Northern Mariana Islands he won three gold medals in the 96 kg category. He also won a gold medal at the Oceania Weightlifting Championships, held concurrently.
