= Ulina Sagone =

Fijian weightlifter

Personal information
- Full name: Ulina Tinaiadivila Sagone
- Born: 18 February 1998 (age 28)
- Weight: 52.51 kg (115.8 lb)

Sport
- Country: Fiji
- Sport: Weightlifting
- Weight class: 53 kg
Medal record
Women's weightlifting
Representing Fiji
Commonwealth Championships
Bronze medal – third place	2016 Penang	58 kg
Oceania Championships
Gold medal – first place	2013 Brisbane	48 kg
Silver medal – second place	2026 Apia	69 kg
- Updated on 30 January 2022

Ulina Tinaiadivila Sagone (born 18 February 1998) is a Fijian female weightlifter, competing in the 53 kg category and representing Fiji at international competitions.

She won a gold medal at the 2013 Oceania Weightlifting Championships. She participated at the 2014 Youth Olympic Games. She won the bronze medal in the snatch at the 2016 Oceania Weightlifting Championships.

== Major results ==
Year	Venue	Weight	Snatch (kg)				Clean & Jerk (kg)				Total	Rank
Year	Venue	Weight	1	2	3	Rank	1	2	3	Rank	Total	Rank
Oceania Weightlifting Championships
2016	Suva, Fiji	53 kg	57	~~62~~	62	3rd place, bronze medalist(s)	65	~~74~~	~~74~~	4	127	4
