= Erika Camacho =

Mexican-American mathematician

Erika Tatiana Camacho
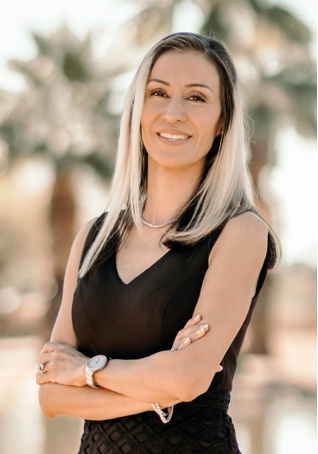
- Born: Erika Tatiana Camacho; September 3, 1974; Guadalajara, Jalisco, Mexico
- Education: Cornell University; Wellesley College
- Scientific career
- Fields: Mathematical Biology; Applied mathematics
- Workplaces: University of Texas at San Antonio; Arizona State University; Loyola Marymount University; Los Alamos National Laboratory; Cal Poly Pomona; Cornell University
- Thesis: Mathematical Models of Retinal Dynamics
- Doctoral advisor: Richard H. Rand
- Website: sciences.utsa.edu/labs/erika-camacho/

Personal

Erika Tatiana Camacho is a Mexican and American mathematical biologist and professor of mathematics at the University of Texas at San Antonio. She is a 2014 Presidential Award for Excellence in Science, Mathematics, and Engineering Mentoring (PAESMEM) awardee. She was taught and mentored in high school by Jaime Escalante, who was the subject of the movie Stand and Deliver.

== Education ==
Camacho was born 3 September 1974, in Guadalajara, Mexico. She attended high school at Garfield High School from 1990 to 1993 where she was taught by Jaime Escalante. Being the first high school graduate in her family and a first generation college student. After graduating from Wellesley College, cum laude, with Bachelor of Arts degrees in mathematics and economics in 1997, she went to earn a PhD in applied mathematics at Cornell University in 2003 for her research on mathematical models of retinal dynamics. Camacho has also earned a Master of Science in Applied mathematics at Cornell University.

== Career ==
After spending a year as a postdoc at Los Alamos National Laboratory, where she used mathematical models to study how extremist groups recruit and grow, Camacho joined the faculty of the Department of Mathematics at Loyola Marymount University in 2004. She co-founded and co-directed the summer Research Experiences for Undergraduates, the Applied Mathematical Sciences Summer Research Institute (AMSSI), that ran from 2005 to 2007 with support from the National Science Foundation and the National Security Agency. Her research focuses on mathematical models of photoreceptors in the retina. In 2007, she moved to Arizona State University where she worked as a professor of applied mathematics. In 2013–2014, she taught at MIT in the MLK Visiting Scholars program. She has served on numerous national boards including the Council of the American Mathematical Society (AMS), the Advisory Board of National Institute for Mathematical and Biological Synthesis (NIMBioS), and SACNAS Board of Directors. She served as an AMS Council member at large from 2018 to 2020.

In September 2019 she began a 3-year rotation as a Program Director with the National Science Foundation. She was co-lead of the HSI Program and worked with the ADVANCE Program. She served as a Program Director in the Racial Equity in STEM Program Description where she and the other Program Directors were awarded a 2022 Director's Award for Superior Accomplishment: "For excellence, inclusion, collaboration, integrity, learning, transparency, and public service in creating and bringing to fruition the EHR Racial Equity in STEM Education Program Description, a timely idea whose impact may fundamentally change the scientific endeavor and NSF."

Her first publication led to the discovery of rod-drive cone visibility factor. This discovery focused on RPE cell development. In January 2023, she began a Fulbright Scholar Award at the Institut de la Vision in Paris (Sorbonne University), and in August of that year, she announced her move to the University of Texas at San Antonio (UTSA). She is a Professor in the Department of Mathematics and in the Department of Neuroscience, Developmental and Regenerative Biology (NDRB) at UTSA. She holds the inaugural Manuel P. Berriozábal, Ph.D. and María Antonietta Berriozábal Endowed Chair. She is also a staunch advocate for inclusivity in STEM.

== Awards ==
Camacho is the recipient of the American Association for the Advancement of Science's 2019 Mentor Award and a 2014 Presidential Award for Excellence in Science, Mathematics, and Engineering Mentoring (PAESMEM), from the White House, awarded for her research with and mentoring of undergraduates. In 2023 she received the M. Gweneth Humphreys Award in recognition of mathematics educators who have exhibited outstanding mentorship and in 2020 she received the Louise Hay Award for Mathematics Education, both from the Association for Women in Mathematics.

She won the 2020 SACNAS Presidential Service Award, the 2018 American Association of Hispanics in Higher Education (AAHHE) Outstanding Latino/a Faculty in Higher Education Research/Teaching (Research Institutions) Award (now the AAHHE Sylvia Hurtado University Faculty Award), the 2017 HENAAC Education Award, the 2012 SACNAS Distinguished Undergraduate Institution Mentor Award, and the 2011 Hispanic Women's Corporation National Latina Leadership Award. In 2012, Camacho also received the 40 Hispanic Leaders Under 40 Award in Phoenix.

Camacho was selected a Fellow of the Association for Women in Mathematics in the class of 2024 "for her leadership in the advancement, mentoring, and support of women and underrepresented groups at all levels through the creation of opportunities, collaborative research, and impactful service. Her work brings sustained systemic change, diversity, equity, and inclusion in mathematics, and more broadly in STEM." She was elected as a Fellow of the American Mathematical Society in the 2024 class of fellows.
