= 2026 Oceania Weightlifting Championships =

Weightlifting competition in Apia, Samoa

- Venue: Tuanaimato Sports Complex
- Location: Apia, Samoa
- Dates: 27 April – 1 May
- Organizing body: Oceania Weightlifting Federation
- Competitors: TBA from TBA nations

The 2026 Oceania Weightlifting Championships were held in Apia, Samoa from 27 April to 1 May 2026.

== Background ==
The competition will also serve as the qualification event for XXIII Commonwealth Games in Glasgow in 2026.

This championship will happen with the 2026 Universal Weightlifting Cup/IWF World Cup and including the Oceania Junior & Youth Championships and the Commonwealth Junior and Youth Championships.

== Medal table ==
Ranking by Big (Total result) medals

* Host nation (Samoa)

Rank	Nation	Gold	Silver	Bronze	Total
1	Samoa*	5	1	1	7
2	Australia	4	4	3	11
3	Nauru	3	2	3	8
4	New Zealand	2	3	3	8
5	Papua New Guinea	1	1	3	5
6	Solomon Islands	1	0	0	1
7	Fiji	0	2	1	3
8	Kiribati	0	2	0	2
9	Northern Mariana Islands	0	1	0	1
10	Cook Islands	0	0	1	1
10	Palau	0	0	1	1
Totals (11 entries)		16	16	16	48

Ranking by all medals: Big (Total result) and Small (Snatch and Clean & Jerk)

* Host nation (Samoa)

Rank	Nation	Gold	Silver	Bronze	Total
1	Samoa*	13	4	4	21
2	Australia	12	15	8	35
3	Nauru	8	6	7	21
4	New Zealand	6	11	12	29
5	Papua New Guinea	4	3	8	15
6	Kiribati	2	2	1	5
7	Solomon Islands	2	1	0	3
8	Fiji	1	3	4	8
9	Northern Mariana Islands	0	2	1	3
10	Palau	0	1	1	2
11	Cook Islands	0	0	2	2
Totals (11 entries)		48	48	48	144

== Medal overview ==
=== Men ===
Event		Gold		Silver		Bronze	
– 60 kg	Snatch	Reinataake Takenteiti (KIR)	101 kg	Johannes Adam (NRU)	100 kg	Bau Doura (PNG)	96 kg
– 60 kg	Clean & Jerk	Johannes Adam (NRU)	133 kg	Bau Doura (PNG)	130 kg	Reinataake Takenteiti (KIR)	125 kg
– 60 kg	Total	Johannes Adam (NRU)	233 kg	Reinataake Takenteiti (KIR)	226 kg	Bau Doura (PNG)	226 kg
– 65 kg	Snatch	Morea Baru (PNG)	121 kg	Blaine Patris (PLW)	110 kg	Leowell Cristobal (NMI)	108 kg
– 65 kg	Clean & Jerk	Morea Baru (PNG)	150 kg	Leowell Cristobal (NMI)	138 kg	Alfred Degia (NRU)	136 kg
– 65 kg	Total	Morea Baru (PNG)	271 kg	Leowell Cristobal (NMI)	246 kg	Blaine Patris (PLW)	242 kg
– 71 kg	Snatch	John Tafi (SAM)	140 kg OC	Ezekiel Moses (NRU)	135 kg	Poama Qaqa (FIJ)	132 kg
– 71 kg	Clean & Jerk	John Tafi (SAM)	171 kg OC	Ezekiel Moses (NRU)	165 kg	Poama Qaqa (FIJ)	160 kg
– 71 kg	Total	John Tafi (SAM)	311 kg OC	Ezekiel Moses (NRU)	300 kg	Poama Qaqa (FIJ)	292 kg
– 79 kg	Snatch	Rory Scott (AUS)	133 kg	Marco Mollo (NZL)	133 kg	Kyle Itsimaera (NRU)	130 kg
– 79 kg	Clean & Jerk	Ruben Katoatau (KIR)	170 kg	Marco Mollo (NZL)	169 kg	Faitasia Seuao (SAM)	162 kg
– 79 kg	Total	Marco Mollo (NZL)	302 kg	Ruben Katoatau (KIR)	297 kg	Kyle Itsimaera (NRU)	286 kg
– 88 kg	Snatch	Cameron McTaggart (NZL)	154 kg	Ryven Ewing (AUS)	136 kg	Thomas Shannon (AUS)	132 kg
– 88 kg	Clean & Jerk	Cameron McTaggart (NZL)	185 kg OC	Ryven Ewing (AUS)	178 kg	Thomas Shannon (AUS)	170 kg
– 88 kg	Total	Cameron McTaggart (NZL)	339 kg OC	Ryven Ewing (AUS)	314 kg	Thomas Shannon (AUS)	302 kg
– 94 kg	Snatch	Oliver Saxton (AUS)	157 kg OC	Emmanuel Ulimasao (SAM)	146 kg	Xavier Albert (NZL)	143 kg
– 94 kg	Clean & Jerk	Oliver Saxton (AUS)	188 kg OC	Emmanuel Ulimasao (SAM)	175 kg	Jerome Tura (COK)	165 kg
– 94 kg	Total	Oliver Saxton (AUS)	345 kg OC	Emmanuel Ulimasao (SAM)	321 kg	Jerome Tura (COK)	287 kg
– 110 kg	Snatch	Taniela Rainibogi (FIJ)	173 kg OC	Ridge Barredo (AUS)	161 kg	Jack Opeloge (SAM)	160 kg
– 110 kg	Clean & Jerk	Jack Opeloge (SAM)	214 kg OC	Jackson Roberts-Young (AUS)	201 kg	Taniela Rainibogi (FIJ)	200 kg
– 110 kg	Total	Jack Opeloge (SAM)	374 kg OC	Taniela Rainibogi (FIJ)	373 kg	Ridge Barredo (AUS)	357 kg
+ 110 kg	Snatch	Sanele Mao (SAM)	185 kg OC	David Liti (NZL)	175 kg	Suamili Nanai (AUS)	170 kg
+ 110 kg	Clean & Jerk	Sanele Mao (SAM)	225 kg OC	David Liti (NZL)	212 kg	Suamili Nanai (AUS)	185 kg
+ 110 kg	Total	Sanele Mao (SAM)	410 kg OC	David Liti (NZL)	387 kg	Suamili Nanai (AUS)	355 kg

=== Women ===
Event		Gold		Silver		Bronze	
– 48 kg	Snatch	Jo-Beth Deireragea (NRU)	71 kg OC	Jianne Gungon (AUS)	69 kg	Thelma Toua (PNG)	63 kg
– 48 kg	Clean & Jerk	Jo-Beth Deireragea (NRU)	86 kg	Jianne Gungon (AUS)	83 kg	Thelma Toua (PNG)	83 kg
– 48 kg	Total	Jo-Beth Deireragea (NRU)	157 kg	Jianne Gungon (AUS)	152 kg	Thelma Toua (PNG)	146 kg
– 53 kg	Snatch	Jenly Tegu Wini (SOL)	75 kg	Dika Toua (PNG)	73 kg	Idau Vagi (PNG)	64 kg
– 53 kg	Clean & Jerk	Dika Toua (PNG)	95 kg	Jenly Tegu Wini (SOL)	95 kg	Idau Vagi (PNG)	83 kg
– 53 kg	Total	Jenly Tegu Wini (SOL)	170 kg	Dika Toua (PNG)	168 kg	Idau Vagi (PNG)	147 kg
– 58 kg	Snatch	Tessa Rim (AUS)	80 kg	Kayla Miller-Gorce (AUS)	79 kg	Elizabeth Granger (NZL)	75 kg
– 58 kg	Clean & Jerk	Kayla Miller-Gorce (AUS)	93 kg	My-Only Stephen (NRU)	90 kg	Margaret Harris (NRU)	80 kg
– 58 kg	Total	Kayla Miller-Gorce (AUS)	172 kg	My-Only Stephen (NRU)	160 kg	Margaret Harris (NRU)	150 kg
– 63 kg	Snatch	Femily-Crystie Notte (NRU)	101 kg OC, YWR	Fatima Yakubu (AUS)	90 kg	Sienna Fesolai (NZL)	89 kg
– 63 kg	Clean & Jerk	Femily-Crystie Notte (NRU)	123 kg OC, YWR	Fatima Yakubu (AUS)	113 kg	Sienna Fesolai (NZL)	108 kg
– 63 kg	Total	Femily-Crystie Notte (NRU)	224 kg OC, YWR	Fatima Yakubu (AUS)	203 kg	Sienna Fesolai (NZL)	197 kg
– 69 kg	Snatch	Nya Hayman (AUS)	95 kg	Ulina Sagone (FIJ)	60 kg	Siva Teimitsi (NRU)	55 kg
– 69 kg	Clean & Jerk	Olivia Selemaia (NZL)	124 kg OC	Nya Hayman (AUS)	117 kg	Darcy Kay (AUS)	106 kg
– 69 kg	Total	Nya Hayman (AUS)	212 kg	Ulina Sagone (FIJ)	135 kg	Siva Teimitsi (NRU)	115 kg
– 77 kg	Snatch	Seine Stowers (SAM)	112 kg OC	Georgia Theron (NZL)	98 kg	Heather Curtis (NZL)	97 kg
– 77 kg	Clean & Jerk	Seine Stowers (SAM)	142 kg OC	Isabella Andueza (AUS)	122 kg	Georgia Theron (NZL)	116 kg
– 77 kg	Total	Seine Stowers (SAM)	254 kg OC	Isabella Andueza (AUS)	215 kg	Georgia Theron (NZL)	214 kg
– 86 kg	Snatch	Eileen Cikamatana (AUS)	112 kg	Litia Nacagilevu (NZL)	111 kg	Medea Jones (NZL)	103 kg
– 86 kg	Clean & Jerk	Eileen Cikamatana (AUS)	133 kg	Litia Nacagilevu (NZL)	129 kg	Sefulu Seuao (SAM)	123 kg
– 86 kg	Total	Eileen Cikamatana (AUS)	245 kg	Litia Nacagilevu (NZL)	240 kg	Sefulu Seuao (SAM)	222 kg
+ 86 kg	Snatch	Tui-Alofa Patolo (NZL)	113 kg OC	Iuniarra Sipaia (SAM)	106 kg	Mollie King (NZL)	102 kg
+ 86 kg	Clean & Jerk	Iuniarra Sipaia (SAM)	151 kg OC	Mollie King (NZL)	132 kg	Tui-Alofa Patolo (NZL)	131 kg
+ 86 kg	Total	Iuniarra Sipaia (SAM)	257 kg	Tui-Alofa Patolo (NZL)	244 kg	Mollie King (NZL)	234 kg
