= Avatu Opeloge =

Samoan weightlifter (born 2005)

Personal information
- Born: January 23, 2005 (age 21)

Sport
- Country: Samoa
- Sport: Weightlifting
Medal record
Women's Weightlifting
Representing Samoa
Oceania Championships
Silver medal – second place	2025 Meyuns	77 kg
Pacific Mini Games
Bronze medal – third place	2022 Saipan	76kg snatch
Bronze medal – third place	2022 Saipan	76kg clean & jerk
Bronze medal – third place	2022 Saipan	76kg total

Avatu Opeloge (born 23 January 2005) is a Samoan Weightlifter who has represented Samoa at the Pacific Mini Games. She is the daughter of Olympic- and Commonwealth Games-medalist Ele Opeloge.

At the 2022 Pacific Mini Games in Saipan, Northern Mariana Islands she won three bronze medals in the 76 kg category.
