= Lesila Fiapule =

Samoan weightlifter (born 2001)

Personal information
- Born: 22 October 2001

Sport
- Country: Samoa
- Sport: Weightlifter
Medal record
Women's Weightlifter
Representing Samoa
Pacific Mini Games
Gold medal – first place	2022 Saipan	+87kg snatch
Silver medal – second place	2022 Saipan	+87kg clean & jerk
Silver medal – second place	2022 Saipan	+87kg total
Oceania Weightlifting Championships
Silver medal – second place	2025 Meyuns	+86 kg snatch
Silver medal – second place	2025 Meyuns	+86 kg clean & jerk
Silver medal – second place	2025 Meyuns	+86 kg total
Bronze medal – third place	2018	+90kg snatch
Bronze medal – third place	2018	+90kg clean & jerk
Bronze medal – third place	2018	+90kg total

Lesila Fiapule (born 22 October 2001) is a Samoan weightlifter who has represented Samoa at the Pacific Mini Games and Youth Olympic Games.

Fiapule was educated at Avele College and has been lifting since she was 15. She represented Samoa at the 2018 Oceania Weightlifting Championships in Nouméa, winning three bronze medals in the +90 kg division. Later that year she represented Samoa at the 2018 Summer Youth Olympics in Buenos Aires, Argentina. At the 2019 Junior World Weightlifting Championships in Suva, Fiji she came 7th in the +87 kg division.

At the 2022 Pacific Mini Games in Saipan, Northern Marianas Islands, she won a gold and two silvers in the 87+ kg division.
