= Ajah Pritchard-Lolo =

Ni-Vanuatu weightlifter

Personal information
- Full name: Ajah Matagi Elizabeth Pritchard-Lolo
- Born: 10 August 2002 (age 24) Wellington, New Zealand
- Height: 189 cm (6 ft 2 in)
- Weight: 85 kg (187 lb)

Sport
- Sport: Weightlifting
- Weight class: 81 kg
- Coached by: Simone Pritchard
Medal record
Women's weightlifting
Representing Vanuatu
Pacific Games
Silver medal – second place	2023 Honiara	87 kg
Oceania Championships
Silver medal – second place	2024 Auckland	81 kg
Silver medal – second place	2025 Meyuns	86 kg
Oceania U23 Championships
Silver medal – second place	2023 Apia	87 kg

Ajah Matagi Elizabeth Pritchard-Lolo (born 10 August 2002) is a Ni-Vanuatu weightlifter. After competing in CrossFit events, she took up weightlifting during the COVID-19 pandemic and contested the 2022 Commonwealth Games, where she finished eighth in the 87 kg event. She then won four medals in the 2023 World Weightlifting Championships and qualified for the 2024 Summer Olympics, where she placed 11th out of 13.

== Early life and career ==
Pritchard-Lolo was born on 10 August 2002 and grew up in Vanuatu from age 6. Her father was born in New Zealand, of Samoan descent, and her mother is of Samoan, Dutch, and French descent. She has one sibling. She attended school at JMG Lycée Francais until 16 and then attended Queen Margaret College, Wellington, in New Zealand, before returning to Vanuatu in 2021. Pritchard-Lolo competed in CrossFit events and is a qualified CrossFit coach. During the COVID-19 pandemic, she began competing in weightlifting, while in New Zealand. She continued weightlifting upon her return to Vanuatu, with the help of her mother, who opened a weightlifting club and later became the president of the Vanuatu Weightlifting Federation.

In 2022, Pritchard-Lolo was selected to compete at the 2022 Commonwealth Games on a bipartite invitation, competing in the 87 kg event, where she finished eighth. She attended the Oceania Weightlifting Federation Training Camp in March 2023. Her 2023 season included appearances at the 2023 World Weightlifting Championships in Saudi Arabia, the U23 Junior & Youth Oceania Weightlifting Championships in Apia, and the 2023 Pacific Games in the Solomon Islands, where she won three medals: two silver and a bronze in the snatch, clean & jerk, and total events. She competed at the North Island Weightlifting Championships in Auckland, New Zealand, in June 2024. Later that month she received a universality selection to compete at the 2024 Summer Olympics in the 81 kg category, becoming the first-ever Vanuatu Olympic weightlifter. Pritchard-Lolo was originally targeting an Olympic debut at the 2028 Summer Olympics, before being awarded one of the three female weightlifter universality spots. She lifted 197 kg in total and placed 11th among 13 participants.

== Major results ==
Year	Venue	Weight	Snatch (kg)				Clean & Jerk (kg)				Total	Rank
Year	Venue	Weight	1	2	3	Rank	1	2	3	Rank	Total	Rank
Olympic Games
2024	Paris, France	81 kg	85	89	~~92~~	—N/a	103	108	~~112~~	—N/a	197	11
World Championships
2023	Riyadh, Saudi Arabia	87 kg	85	~~90~~	~~90~~	14	105	~~110~~	111	14	196	13
IWF World Cup
2024	Phuket, Thailand	81 kg	~~90~~	~~90~~	~~90~~	—	100	105	110	24	—	—
Oceania Championships
2023	Honiara, Solomon Islands	87 kg	86	~~89~~	90	2nd place, silver medalist(s)	105	107	~~110~~	3rd place, bronze medalist(s)	197	2nd place, silver medalist(s)
2024	Auckland, New Zealand	81 kg	88	~~91~~	~~92~~	2nd place, silver medalist(s)	105	~~108~~	~~110~~	1st place, gold medalist(s)	193	2nd place, silver medalist(s)
