= Southwest Islanders Village =

- Village
- Map showing location of Southwest Islanders Village
- Coordinates: 7°20′47.80″N 134°27′10.75″E
- Country: Palau
- State: Koror

Area
  - Land: 0.06 km^{2} (0.023 sq mi)
- Elevation: 24 m (79 ft)

Southwest Islanders Village is a small village near Meyuns in Koror, Palau. It consists of a village called Echang (pronounced "Aye-ong") and a jetty.
