= Nicola Lagatao =

Nicola Lagatao (born 10 November 1991) is a Guamanian weightlifter. At the 2022 Pacific Mini Games in Saipan, Lagatao won three gold medals in the women's 45 kg weightlifting division in the snatch (61 kg), the clean and jerk (74 kg), and the overall gold medal. She also won golds for the snatch, clean and jerk, and overall at the 2023 Pacific Games in the women's 45 kg weightlifting class. She competed for Guam in the 2024 Summer Olympics in the women's 49kg weightlifting event, placing 11th out of the 12 participants. At the Games, she set a personal best and the Guam record for the weight class.

== Personal life ==
Lagatao's brother-in-law Edgar Molinos is the head coach of the Guam national weightlifting team.
