= My-Only Stephen =

Nauruan weightlifter (born 2006)

Personal information
- Nationality: Nauru
- Born: 22 May 2006 (age 20) Meneng, Nauru

Sport
- Sport: Weightlifting
- Event: –55 kg
Medal record
Women's weightlifting
Representing Nauru
Oceania Championships
Silver medal – second place	2026 Apia	58 kg
Pacific Games
Bronze medal – third place	2023 Honiara	55 kg

My-Only Stephen (born 22 May 2006) is a weightlifter from Nauru. She won the bronze medal in the women's 55 kg event at the 2023 Pacific Games held in Honiara in the contests snatch and clean and jerk.

== Biography ==
Stephen lives in the Meneng District in Nauru and is engaged in weightlifting since she was 12 years of age.

In the Oceania Weightlifting Championships 2021 she won the silver medal in the women 55 kg class. She took part in the 2022 Commonwealth Games in Birmingham, England where she reached the eighth place. In the Youth category of the Oceania Weightlifting Championships 2024 in Auckland she won the Gold medal in the 55 kg category.
