= Manuila Raobu =

Tuvaluan weightlifter (born 2000)

Personal information
- Born: 18 September 2000 Funafuti, Tuvalu

Sport
- Country: Tuvalu
- Sport: Weightlifting
Medal record
Men's Weightlifting
Representing Tuvalu
Pacific Games
Silver medal – second place	2023 Honiara	73kg snatch
Silver medal – second place	2023 Honiara	73kg snatch
Silver medal – second place	2023 Honiara	73kg total
Pacific Mini Games
Gold medal – first place	2022 Saipan	73kg snatch
Gold medal – first place	2022 Saipan	73kg total
Gold medal – first place	2022 Saipan	73kg
Oceania Championships
Bronze medal – third place	2025 Meyuns	71 kg snatch
Bronze medal – third place	2025 Meyuns	71 kg total

Manuila Raobu (born 18 September 2000) is a Tuvaluan Weightlifter representing Tuvalu at the Commonwealth Games and Pacific Games.

At the 2016 Oceania Weightlifting Championships, he came first in the 56 kg youth category. He was part of Tuvalu's team for the 2018 Commonwealth Games on the Gold Coast, where he was Tuvalu's flagbearer at the opening ceremony. He later competed at the 2015, 2019 and the 2023 Pacific Games.

During the COVID-19 pandemic, he was stranded in Samoa. While there, he trained with Samoan weightlifters under Tuaopepe Jerry Wallwork. At the Oceania Championships 2019, he came in position five and position three in Oceania Junior Championship.

At the 2022 Pacific Mini Games in Saipan, Northern Mariana Islands, he won two gold medals in the 73 kg category and gold in the 2022 Oceania Weightlifting Championships held simultaneously.

At the 2023 Pacific Games in Honiara, Solomon Islands, he won three silver medals in the 73 kg category.
