= Nya Hayman =

Australian weightlifter

Personal information
- Full name: Nya Phebe Hayman
- Born: 14 May 2005 (age 21) Rockhampton, Queensland, Australia

Sport
- Country: Australia
- Sport: Weightlifting
Medal record
Women's weightlifting
Representing Australia
Commonwealth Games
Bronze medal – third place	2026 Glasgow	69 kg
Oceania Weightlifting Championships
Gold medal – first place	2025 Palau	69 kg
Gold medal – first place	2026 Apia	69 kg
- Updated on 5 August 2026

Nya Phebe Hayman (born 14 May 2005) is an Australian weightlifter.

Hayman won a bronze medal in the women's 69kg weightlifting event at the 2026 Commonwealth Games in Glasgow, which was the first medal to be won by the Australian women's weightlifting team at the 2026 Games.

== Early life ==
Born and raised in the Queensland city of Rockhampton, Hayman participated in a variety of sports during her youth including BMX, netball and trampolining.

In 2019, she joined her local CrossFit gym. During the COVID-19 lockdowns in 2020, Hayman commenced training remotely at home with a weightlifting coach from the Cougars Weightlifting Club in Brisbane.

== Professional success ==
Hayman qualified for the 2022 Youth World Weightlifting Championships in Leon, Mexico in June 2022 where she placed 12th. She also competed in the 2024 World Junior Weightlifting Championships where she placed 18th overall in the 71kg category.

In 2025, she won gold in both the 69kg snatch and clean & jerk events at the 2025 Oceania Weightlifting Championships.

In 2026, Hayman won gold in the 69 kg snatch event at the 2026 Oceania Weightlifting Championships.

Also in 2026, Hayman received a Tier 2 Sport Australia Hall of Fame scholarship.

=== Commonwealth Games ===
At the 2026 Commonwealth Games, Hayman succeeded in achieving a 97kg snatch on her first attempt but failed to complete two 100kg lifts. She moved up to the 121kg which she successfully completed on her second attempt.

Although Hayman was unable to complete a 124kg lift, she was still able to secure a bronze medal which was Australia’s first weightlifting medal for the 2026 Games after Brenna Kean and Kiana Elliott were unable to win a medal in their earlier attempts in their respective events.
