= 2025 World Youth and Junior Weightlifting Championships =

2025 IWF World Youth & Junior Championships
- Venue: Villa Deportiva Nacional
- Location: Lima, Peru
- Dates: 30 April – 5 May

The 2025 World Youth and Junior Weightlifting Championships were held in Lima, Peru, from 30 April to 5 May 2025.

== Medal table ==
=== Youth ===
Ranking by Big (Total result) medals

Rank	Nation	Gold	Silver	Bronze	Total
1	Philippines	3	1	0	4
2	Venezuela	2	2	0	4
3	Kazakhstan	2	0	2	4
4	Uzbekistan	1	3	0	4
–	Individual Neutral Athletes	1	1	2	4
5	Moldova	1	1	1	3
6	Armenia	1	1	0	2
6	China	1	1	0	2
8	Ukraine	1	0	2	3
9	Georgia	1	0	1	2
9	Iran	1	0	1	2
11	Albania	1	0	0	1
11	Brazil	1	0	0	1
11	Egypt	1	0	0	1
11	Fiji	1	0	0	1
11	Mexico	1	0	0	1
16	Turkmenistan	0	3	0	3
16	Vietnam	0	3	0	3
18	Italy	0	1	0	1
18	Nauru	0	1	0	1
18	Samoa	0	1	0	1
18	Turkey	0	1	0	1
22	India	0	0	3	3
23	Saudi Arabia	0	0	2	2
24	Bulgaria	0	0	1	1
24	Finland	0	0	1	1
24	Indonesia	0	0	1	1
24	Iraq	0	0	1	1
24	Latvia	0	0	1	1
24	New Zealand	0	0	1	1
Totals (29 entries)		20	20	20	60

Ranking by all medals: Big (Total result) and Small (Snatch and Clean & Jerk)

Rank	Nation	Gold	Silver	Bronze	Total
1	Philippines	8	2	2	12
2	Venezuela	5	5	4	14
3	Kazakhstan	5	3	3	11
–	Individual Neutral Athletes	4	5	7	16
4	Moldova	4	2	2	8
5	China	4	2	0	6
6	Armenia	4	1	0	5
7	Uzbekistan	3	6	3	12
8	Ukraine	3	2	2	7
9	Albania	3	0	0	3
9	Egypt	3	0	0	3
9	Fiji	3	0	0	3
12	Georgia	2	2	3	7
13	Iran	2	1	2	5
14	Mexico	2	0	2	4
15	Brazil	2	0	1	3
16	Italy	1	2	0	3
16	Turkey	1	2	0	3
18	Bulgaria	1	0	1	2
19	Turkmenistan	0	7	3	10
20	Vietnam	0	7	0	7
21	India	0	2	5	7
22	Nauru	0	2	1	3
22	Samoa	0	2	1	3
24	Finland	0	1	2	3
24	Iraq	0	1	2	3
26	New Zealand	0	1	1	2
27	Poland	0	1	0	1
27	Romania	0	1	0	1
29	Saudi Arabia	0	0	5	5
30	Indonesia	0	0	3	3
31	Japan	0	0	2	2
31	Latvia	0	0	2	2
33	France	0	0	1	1
Totals (33 entries)		60	60	60	180

=== Junior ===
Ranking by Big (Total result) medals

Rank	Nation	Gold	Silver	Bronze	Total
1	China	5	3	2	10
2	Iran	2	4	0	6
3	Egypt	2	0	1	3
4	Japan	1	1	0	2
4	Thailand	1	1	0	2
6	South Korea	1	0	2	3
7	Georgia	1	0	1	2
7	Philippines	1	0	1	2
7	United States	1	0	1	2
10	Brazil	1	0	0	1
10	Canada	1	0	0	1
10	North Korea	1	0	0	1
10	Turkey	1	0	0	1
10	Turkmenistan	1	0	0	1
15	Colombia	0	3	1	4
16	Venezuela	0	2	1	3
–	Individual Neutral Athletes	0	1	3	4
17	Italy	0	1	0	1
17	Mexico	0	1	0	1
17	New Zealand	0	1	0	1
17	Romania	0	1	0	1
17	Vietnam	0	1	0	1
22	Argentina	0	0	1	1
22	Armenia	0	0	1	1
22	Kazakhstan	0	0	1	1
22	Saudi Arabia	0	0	1	1
22	Spain	0	0	1	1
22	Ukraine	0	0	1	1
22	Uzbekistan	0	0	1	1
Totals (28 entries)		20	20	20	60

Ranking by all medals: Big (Total result) and Small (Snatch and Clean & Jerk)

Rank	Nation	Gold	Silver	Bronze	Total
1	China	13	10	7	30
2	Iran	8	8	3	19
3	Egypt	4	2	3	9
4	South Korea	4	0	3	7
5	Thailand	3	1	2	6
6	North Korea	3	1	0	4
7	Canada	3	0	0	3
8	Colombia	2	8	1	11
–	Individual Neutral Athletes	2	3	5	10
9	Japan	2	3	0	5
10	United States	2	2	1	5
11	Philippines	2	1	1	4
12	Brazil	2	1	0	3
13	Georgia	2	0	4	6
14	Turkmenistan	2	0	0	2
15	Venezuela	1	3	3	7
16	Turkey	1	2	2	5
17	Vietnam	1	2	0	3
18	Kazakhstan	1	0	2	3
19	Armenia	1	0	1	2
20	Indonesia	1	0	0	1
21	Romania	0	3	1	4
22	Mexico	0	3	0	3
23	Italy	0	2	1	3
24	Uzbekistan	0	1	4	5
25	New Zealand	0	1	2	3
25	Spain	0	1	2	3
25	Ukraine	0	1	2	3
28	Saudi Arabia	0	1	1	2
29	Argentina	0	0	3	3
29	Moldova	0	0	3	3
31	Albania	0	0	1	1
31	Chinese Taipei	0	0	1	1
31	Poland	0	0	1	1
Totals (33 entries)		60	60	60	180

== Medalists ==
=== Youth ===
==== Men ====
Event	Gold		Silver		Bronze	
49 kg
Snatch	Christian Di Maria; Italy	99 kg	Jay Colonia; Philippines	94 kg	Harsabardhan Sahu; India	87 kg
Clean & Jerk	Jay Colonia; Philippines	121 kg	Christian Di Maria; Italy	115 kg	Harsabardhan Sahu; India	110 kg
Total	Jay Colonia; Philippines	215 kg	Christian Di Maria; Italy	214 kg	Harsabardhan Sahu; India	197 kg
55 kg
Snatch	Danu Secrieru; Moldova	107 kg	Lucian Cambei; Romania	105 kg	Hoshina Ameku; Japan	105 kg
Clean & Jerk	Danu Secrieru; Moldova	132 kg	Hùng Văn Thế; Vietnam	131 kg	Mohammed Al-Ojaian; Saudi Arabia	130 kg
Total	Danu Secrieru; Moldova	239 kg	Hùng Văn Thế; Vietnam	236 kg	Mohammed Al-Ojaian; Saudi Arabia	233 kg
61 kg
Snatch	Beibarys Yerseit; Kazakhstan	117 kg	Abubakar Tsakaev; Individual Neutral Athletes	113 kg	Ayu Higa; Japan	111 kg
Clean & Jerk	Ramazan Efe Yılmaz; Turkey	153 kg	Beibarys Yerseit; Kazakhstan	145 kg	Abdullah Al-Mohaimeed; Saudi Arabia	140 kg
Total	Beibarys Yerseit; Kazakhstan	262 kg	Ramazan Efe Yılmaz; Turkey	261 kg	Abubakar Tsakaev; Individual Neutral Athletes	252 kg
67 kg
Snatch	Dan Betca; Moldova	122 kg	Kamil Andrzejewski; Poland	121 kg	Ali Al-Hawar; Saudi Arabia	120 kg
Clean & Jerk	Luis García; Venezuela	153 kg	Dimitri Abralava; Georgia	147 kg	Dan Betca; Moldova	146 kg
Total	Luis García; Venezuela	269 kg	Dan Betca; Moldova	268 kg	Ali Al-Hawar; Saudi Arabia	264 kg
73 kg
Snatch	Abdelrahman Hussein; Egypt	141 kg	Yernur Myrzakhmet; Kazakhstan	131 kg	Kakamyrat Annamyradow; Turkmenistan	130 kg
Clean & Jerk	Abdelrahman Hussein; Egypt	165 kg	Kakamyrat Annamyradow; Turkmenistan	160 kg	Yernur Myrzakhmet; Kazakhstan	155 kg
Total	Abdelrahman Hussein; Egypt	306 kg	Kakamyrat Annamyradow; Turkmenistan	290 kg	Yernur Myrzakhmet; Kazakhstan	286 kg
81 kg
Snatch	Serhii Kotelevskyi; Ukraine	142 kg	Didarbek Jumabaýew; Turkmenistan	137 kg	Maksims Vasilonoks; Latvia	136 kg
Clean & Jerk	Serhii Kotelevskyi; Ukraine	172 kg	Didarbek Jumabaýew; Turkmenistan	168 kg	José Mantilla; Mexico	166 kg
Total	Serhii Kotelevskyi; Ukraine	314 kg	Didarbek Jumabaýew; Turkmenistan	305 kg	Maksims Vasilonoks; Latvia	297 kg
89 kg
Snatch	Nehemiah Elder; Fiji	152 kg	Khuthair Qaiti Mousa; Iraq	145 kg	Andrei Solopii; Individual Neutral Athletes	144 kg
Clean & Jerk	Nehemiah Elder; Fiji	180 kg	Munisbek Davletov; Uzbekistan	179 kg	Khuthair Qaiti Mousa; Iraq	173 kg
Total	Nehemiah Elder; Fiji	332 kg	Munisbek Davletov; Uzbekistan	319 kg	Khuthair Qaiti Mousa; Iraq	318 kg
96 kg
Snatch	Grigor Ghazaryan; Armenia	145 kg	Islam Akmyradow; Turkmenistan	141 kg	Aleksandr Bagaev; Individual Neutral Athletes	141 kg
Clean & Jerk	Grigor Ghazaryan; Armenia	185 kg	Parv Chaudhary; India	175 kg	Islam Akmyradow; Turkmenistan	175 kg
Total	Grigor Ghazaryan; Armenia	330 kg	Islam Akmyradow; Turkmenistan	316 kg	Parv Chaudhary; India	315 kg
102 kg
Snatch	Alisher Osmanov; Uzbekistan	146 kg	Jaba Tkeshelashvili; Georgia	145 kg	Saba Chikhladze; Georgia	130 kg
Clean & Jerk	Jaba Tkeshelashvili; Georgia	192 kg	Alisher Osmanov; Uzbekistan	170 kg	Saba Chikhladze; Georgia	162 kg
Total	Jaba Tkeshelashvili; Georgia	337 kg	Alisher Osmanov; Uzbekistan	316 kg	Saba Chikhladze; Georgia	292 kg
+102 kg
Snatch	Harutyun Hovhannisyan; Armenia	150 kg	Semen Karavaev; Individual Neutral Athletes	147 kg	Hossein Yazdani; Iran	144 kg
Clean & Jerk	Hossein Yazdani; Iran	190 kg	Volodymyr Chmykh; Ukraine	180 kg	Semen Karavaev; Individual Neutral Athletes	175 kg
Total	Hossein Yazdani; Iran	334 kg	Harutyun Hovhannisyan; Armenia	323 kg	Volodymyr Chmykh; Ukraine	323 kg

==== Women ====
Event	Gold		Silver		Bronze	
40 kg
Snatch	Althea Bacaro; Philippines	58 kg	Ecrin Naz Şahin; Turkey	57 kg	Isanelly Da Silva; Brazil	57 kg
Clean & Jerk	Isanelly Da Silva; Brazil	77 kg YWR	Jyoshna Sabar; India	72 kg	Althea Bacaro; Philippines	72 kg
Total	Isanelly Da Silva; Brazil	134 kg	Althea Bacaro; Philippines	130 kg	Jyoshna Sabar; India	128 kg
45 kg
Snatch	Alexsandra Diaz; Philippines	70 kg	Kateryna Malashchuk; Ukraine	69 kg	Arianye Echandia; Venezuela	69 kg
Clean & Jerk	Valeria Osorio; Venezuela	84 kg	Arianye Echandia; Venezuela	82 kg	Alexsandra Diaz; Philippines	82 kg
Total	Alexsandra Diaz; Philippines	152 kg	Arianye Echandia; Venezuela	151 kg	Kateryna Malashchuk; Ukraine	150 kg
49 kg
Snatch	Boyana Kostadinova; Bulgaria	75 kg	Y Liên; Vietnam	74 kg	Kelly López; Mexico	73 kg
Clean & Jerk	Kelly López; Mexico	96 kg	Y Liên; Vietnam	94 kg	Enderlin Ulacio; Venezuela	91 kg
Total	Kelly López; Mexico	169 kg	Y Liên; Vietnam	168 kg	Boyana Kostadinova; Bulgaria	164 kg
55 kg
Snatch	Jhodie Peralta; Philippines	84 kg	Nicoleta Cojocaru; Moldova	82 kg	Margot Kochetova; France	80 kg
Clean & Jerk	Jhodie Peralta; Philippines	104 kg	Y Thọ; Vietnam	103 kg	Ogulşat Amanowa; Turkmenistan	101 kg
Total	Jhodie Peralta; Philippines	188 kg	Y Thọ; Vietnam	183 kg	Nicoleta Cojocaru; Moldova	182 kg
59 kg
Snatch	Xeniya Prozorova; Kazakhstan	91 kg	Marjona Abdumutalova; Uzbekistan	88 kg	Ivanis Silva; Venezuela	86 kg
Clean & Jerk	Xeniya Prozorova; Kazakhstan	108 kg	Polina Pavlovich; Individual Neutral Athletes	104 kg	Marjona Abdumutalova; Uzbekistan	102 kg
Total	Xeniya Prozorova; Kazakhstan	199 kg	Marjona Abdumutalova; Uzbekistan	190 kg	Polina Pavlovich; Individual Neutral Athletes	189 kg
64 kg
Snatch	Carja Enkileda; Albania	98 kg	Femily-Crystie Notte; Nauru	92 kg	Valeriia Drevnovskaia; Individual Neutral Athletes	86 kg
Clean & Jerk	Carja Enkileda; Albania	115 kg	Seyedeh Zahra Hosseini; Iran	111 kg	Femily-Crystie Notte; Nauru	110 kg
Total	Carja Enkileda; Albania	213 kg	Femily-Crystie Notte; Nauru	202 kg	Seyedeh Zahra Hosseini; Iran	197 kg
71 kg
Snatch	Lin Jingwei; China	100 kg	Kira Danilova; Kazakhstan	94 kg	Dilnura Kholdorova; Uzbekistan	93 kg
Clean & Jerk	Lin Jingwei; China	131 kg YWR	Darya Kuznetsova; Individual Neutral Athletes	117 kg	Mariya Ivanova; Individual Neutral Athletes	115 kg
Total	Lin Jingwei; China	231 kg YWR	Darya Kuznetsova; Individual Neutral Athletes	210 kg	Kira Danilova; Kazakhstan	209 kg
76 kg
Snatch	Varvara Kuzminova; Individual Neutral Athletes	108 kg YWR	Seine Stowers; Samoa	98 kg	Minni Hormavirta; Finland	90 kg
Clean & Jerk	Varvara Kuzminova; Individual Neutral Athletes	127 kg	Minni Hormavirta; Finland	117 kg	Seine Stowers; Samoa	116 kg
Total	Varvara Kuzminova; Individual Neutral Athletes	235 kg YWR	Seine Stowers; Samoa	214 kg	Minni Hormavirta; Finland	207 kg
81 kg
Snatch	Li Xue; China	104 kg	Lidysmar Aparicio; Venezuela	103 kg	Alyamaulida Kartika Pertiwi; Indonesia	96 kg
Clean & Jerk	Lidysmar Aparicio; Venezuela	127 kg	Li Xue; China	125 kg	Alyamaulida Kartika Pertiwi; Indonesia	120 kg
Total	Lidysmar Aparicio; Venezuela	230 kg	Li Xue; China	229 kg	Alyamaulida Kartika Pertiwi; Indonesia	216 kg
+81 kg
Snatch	Sofia Vragova; Individual Neutral Athletes	100 kg	Bárbara Mendoza; Venezuela	99 kg	Mohinur Esonboeva; Uzbekistan	98 kg
Clean & Jerk	Mohinur Esonboeva; Uzbekistan	127 kg	Mollie King; New Zealand	126 kg	Bárbara Mendoza; Venezuela	125 kg
Total	Mohinur Esonboeva; Uzbekistan	225 kg	Bárbara Mendoza; Venezuela	224 kg	Mollie King; New Zealand	223 kg

=== Junior ===
==== Men ====
Event	Gold		Silver		Bronze	
55 kg
Snatch	Kotaro Tomari; Japan	123 kg JWR	K'Dương; Vietnam	113 kg	Zhang Weiqiang; China	111 kg
Clean & Jerk	K'Dương; Vietnam	144 kg	Kotaro Tomari; Japan	143 kg	Zhang Weiqiang; China	136 kg
Total	Kotaro Tomari; Japan	266 kg JWR	K'Dương; Vietnam	257 kg	Zhang Weiqiang; China	247 kg
61 kg
Snatch	José González; Colombia	125 kg	Kim Ju-phyong; North Korea	124 kg	Giga Odikadze; Georgia	123 kg
Clean & Jerk	Elsayed Aly Attia; Egypt	160 kg	Ramazan Efe Yılmaz; Turkey	153 kg	Ion Badanev; Moldova	150 kg
Total	Elsayed Aly Attia; Egypt	282 kg	José González; Colombia	273 kg	Giga Odikadze; Georgia	270 kg
67 kg
Snatch	Yang Jinwen; China	140 kg	Diyorbek Ruzmetov; Uzbekistan	139 kg	Engin Kara; Turkey	135 kg
Clean & Jerk	Albert Delos Santos; Philippines	175 kg	Yang Jinwen; China	167 kg	Diyorbek Ruzmetov; Uzbekistan	163 kg
Total	Albert Delos Santos; Philippines	309 kg	Yang Jinwen; China	307 kg	Diyorbek Ruzmetov; Uzbekistan	302 kg
73 kg
Snatch	Park Ju-hyeon; South Korea	147 kg	Mohammed Al-Marzouq; Saudi Arabia	146 kg	Tiberiu Donose; Romania	145 kg
Clean & Jerk	Park Ju-hyeon; South Korea	177 kg	Tiberiu Donose; Romania	176 kg	Alexandr Baldji; Moldova	172 kg
Total	Park Ju-hyeon; South Korea	324 kg	Tiberiu Donose; Romania	321 kg	Mohammed Al-Marzouq; Saudi Arabia	316 kg
81 kg
Snatch	Chen Shunnan; China	156 kg	Rakuei Azuma; Japan	155 kg	Khikmatillo Khaydarov; Uzbekistan	154 kg
Clean & Jerk	Yerasyl Saulebekov; Kazakhstan	190 kg	Chen Shunnan; China	190 kg	Yedige Yemberdi; Kazakhstan	187 kg
Total	Chen Shunnan; China	346 kg	Rakuei Azuma; Japan	340 kg	Yerasyl Saulebekov; Kazakhstan	340 kg
89 kg
Snatch	Ángel Rodríguez; Venezuela	164 kg	David Cuesta; Colombia	163 kg	Goga Jajvani; Georgia	162 kg
Clean & Jerk	Goga Jajvani; Georgia	198 kg	David Cuesta; Colombia	196 kg	Iliya Salehi; Iran	195 kg
Total	Goga Jajvani; Georgia	360 kg	Ángel Rodríguez; Venezuela	359 kg	David Cuesta; Colombia	359 kg
96 kg
Snatch	Ihnatsi Pauliukavets; Individual Neutral Athletes	167 kg	Ahmed Gamal El-Basyou; Egypt	166 kg	Amirhosein Sepah; Iran	165 kg
Clean & Jerk	Hamidreza Zarei; Iran	203 kg	Ahmed Gamal El-Basyou; Egypt	200 kg	Amirhosein Sepah; Iran	199 kg
Total	Ahmed Gamal El-Basyou; Egypt	366 kg	Amirhosein Sepah; Iran	364 kg	Ihnatsi Pauliukavets; Individual Neutral Athletes	363 kg
102 kg
Snatch	Abolfazl Zare; Iran	176 kg	Matheus Pessanha; Brazil	175 kg	Mahmoud Hosny Hassan; Egypt	168 kg
Clean & Jerk	Matheus Pessanha; Brazil	220 kg JWR	Abolfazl Zare; Iran	210 kg	Mahmoud Hosny Hassan; Egypt	203 kg
Total	Matheus Pessanha; Brazil	395 kg	Abolfazl Zare; Iran	386 kg	Mahmoud Hosny Hassan; Egypt	371 kg
109 kg
Snatch	Alireza Nassiri; Iran	180 kg	Yemialyan Maskaleu; Individual Neutral Athletes	169 kg	Kudratbek Salimjonov; Uzbekistan	167 kg
Clean & Jerk	Alireza Nassiri; Iran	220 kg	Farhad Gholizadeh; Iran	205 kg	Andrii Borovskyi; Ukraine	201 kg
Total	Alireza Nassiri; Iran	400 kg	Farhad Gholizadeh; Iran	370 kg	Andrii Borovskyi; Ukraine	366 kg
+109 kg
Snatch	Hamidreza Mohammadi; Iran	181 kg	Taha Nemati; Iran	180 kg	Georgii Myand; Individual Neutral Athletes	175 kg
Clean & Jerk	Hamidreza Mohammadi; Iran	213 kg	Taha Nemati; Iran	212 kg	Marek Gugała; Poland	208 kg
Total	Hamidreza Mohammadi; Iran	394 kg	Taha Nemati; Iran	392 kg	Georgii Myand; Individual Neutral Athletes	382 kg

==== Women ====
Event	Gold		Silver		Bronze	
45 kg
Snatch	Hu Yuhuan; China	74 kg	Angeline Colonia; Philippines	72 kg	Khemika Kamnoedsri; Thailand	72 kg
Clean & Jerk	Hu Yuhuan; China	96 kg	Ioana Miron; Romania	90 kg	Khemika Kamnoedsri; Thailand	89 kg
Total	Hu Yuhuan; China	170 kg	Khemika Kamnoedsri; Thailand	161 kg	Angeline Colonia; Philippines	160 kg
49 kg
Snatch	Luluk Diana Tri Wijayana; Indonesia	81 kg	Lucía González; Spain	80 kg	Yan Qihui; China	79 kg
Clean & Jerk	Yan Qihui; China	100 kg	Kerlys Montilla; Venezuela	99 kg	Lucía González; Spain	95 kg
Total	Yan Qihui; China	179 kg	Kerlys Montilla; Venezuela	176 kg	Lucía González; Spain	175 kg
55 kg
Snatch	Wei Tingna; China	94 kg	Celine Ludovica Delia; Italy	91 kg	Chen Guan-ling; Chinese Taipei	90 kg
Clean & Jerk	Aleksandra Grigoryan; Armenia	116 kg	Wei Tingna; China	115 kg	Celine Ludovica Delia; Italy	114 kg
Total	Wei Tingna; China	209 kg	Celine Ludovica Delia; Italy	205 kg	Aleksandra Grigoryan; Armenia	204 kg
59 kg
Snatch	Thanaporn Saetia; Thailand	96 kg	Gelen Torres; Colombia	93 kg	María Paz Casadevall; Argentina	91 kg
Clean & Jerk	Thanaporn Saetia; Thailand	115 kg	Gelen Torres; Colombia	113 kg	María Paz Casadevall; Argentina	113 kg
Total	Thanaporn Saetia; Thailand	211 kg	Gelen Torres; Colombia	206 kg	María Paz Casadevall; Argentina	204 kg
64 kg
Snatch	Yang Liuyue; China	106 kg	Jiang Yanfang; China	105 kg	Carja Enkileda; Albania	98 kg
Clean & Jerk	Yang Liuyue; China	130 kg	Sophia Shaft; United States	126 kg	Jiang Yanfang; China	126 kg
Total	Yang Liuyue; China	236 kg	Jiang Yanfang; China	231 kg	Sophia Shaft; United States	223 kg
71 kg
Snatch	Charlotte Simoneau; Canada	111 kg	María Mena; Colombia	106 kg	Olivia Selemaia; New Zealand	106 kg
Clean & Jerk	Charlotte Simoneau; Canada	134 kg	Wang Mengting; China	130 kg	Olivia Selemaia; New Zealand	129 kg
Total	Charlotte Simoneau; Canada	245 kg	Olivia Selemaia; New Zealand	235 kg	Wang Mengting; China	231 kg
76 kg
Snatch	Varvara Kuzminova; Individual Neutral Athletes	108 kg	Ella Nicholson; United States	106 kg	Nana Khorava; Georgia	103 kg
Clean & Jerk	Ella Nicholson; United States	130 kg	Varvara Kuzminova; Individual Neutral Athletes	127 kg	Alexandrina Ciubotaru; Moldova	124 kg
Total	Ella Nicholson; United States	236 kg	Varvara Kuzminova; Individual Neutral Athletes	235 kg	Jeon Hee-soo; South Korea	225 kg
81 kg
Snatch	Kim Yong-ju; North Korea	110 kg	Xu Qianran; China	106 kg	Lidysmar Aparicio; Venezuela	103 kg
Clean & Jerk	Kim Yong-ju; North Korea	142 kg	Xu Qianran; China	141 kg	Lidysmar Aparicio; Venezuela	127 kg
Total	Kim Yong-ju; North Korea	252 kg	Xu Qianran; China	247 kg	Lidysmar Aparicio; Venezuela	230 kg
87 kg
Snatch	Rahma Ahmed Elsayed; Egypt	110 kg	Mairyn Hernández; Mexico	109 kg	Zhao Ziyu; China	109 kg
Clean & Jerk	Anamjan Rüstamowa; Turkmenistan	141 kg	Mairyn Hernández; Mexico	135 kg	Mariia Gruzdova; Individual Neutral Athletes	134 kg
Total	Anamjan Rüstamowa; Turkmenistan	249 kg	Mairyn Hernández; Mexico	244 kg	Mariia Gruzdova; Individual Neutral Athletes	242 kg
+87 kg
Snatch	Yairan Tysforod; Colombia	111 kg	Fatmagül Çevik; Turkey	110 kg	Lee Hae-un; South Korea	106 kg
Clean & Jerk	Lee Hae-un; South Korea	135 kg	Hanna Kalashnyk; Ukraine	135 kg	Fatmagül Çevik; Turkey	135 kg
Total	Fatmagül Çevik; Turkey	245 kg	Yairan Tysforod; Colombia	242 kg	Lee Hae-un; South Korea	241 kg

== Team ranking ==
=== Youth ===
Men

Rank	Team	Points
1	Peru	405
2	Venezuela	321
3	Chinese Taipei	298
4	Turkey	292
5	Bulgaria	290
6	Georgia	285

Women

Rank	Team	Points
1	Venezuela	663
2	United States	548
3	Mexico	419
4	Peru	401
5	Chinese Taipei	317
6	Ecuador	303

=== Junior ===
Men

Rank	Team	Points
1	Iran	725
2	Colombia	548
3	Venezuela	434
4	Uzbekistan	377
5	Turkey	356
6	Georgia	329

Women

Rank	Team	Points
1	China	613
2	Venezuela	421
3	United States	397
4	Mexico	353
5	Canada	341
6	New Zealand	307
