= Faustina Opeloge =

Samoan weightlifter

Personal information
- Born: Faustina Opeloge

Sport
- Country: Samoa
- Sport: Weightlifting
Medal record
Women's Weightlifting
Representing Samoa
Pacific Mini Games
Gold medal – first place	2022 Saipan	81 kg

Faustina Niusila Opeloge (born ~2005) is a Samoan weightlifter. She won a gold medal at the 2022 Pacific Mini Games. She is the daughter of Commonwealth Games gold medalist Niusila Opeloge.

Opeloge was educated at Leififi College. She competed at the 2019 Pacific Games in Apia at the age of 14, winning a gold medal in powerlifting. At the 2022 Pacific Mini Games in Saipan, Northern Mariana Islands she won gold in the 81 kg category. She also won gold in the 2022 Oceania Senior Championships in the same weight category.
