= Seine Stowers =

Samoan weightlifter (born 2008)

Personal information
- Nationality: Samoan
- Born: 30 April 2008 (age 18)
- Home town: Tuana'imato, Samoa

Sport
- Sport: Weightlifting
Medal record
Women's weightlifting
Representing Samoa
Commonwealth Games
Gold medal – first place	2026 Glasgow	+77 kg
Youth World Championships
Silver medal – second place	2025 Lima	76 kg

Seine Stowers (born 30 April 2008) is a Samoan weightlifter. She is a junior world record holder. She was a gold medal at the 2026 Commonwealth Games, setting a new Games record in the 77kg division.

== Early and personal life ==
Based in Tuana'imato, she trains in Apia at the Oceania Weightlifting Institute. The seventh of eight children, she has weightlifting in her family; her older sister Feagaiga Stowers won a Commonwealth Games gold medal in 2018.

== Career ==
In 2025, at the age of 17 years old, Stowers became the first Samoan in an Olympic sport to set three world youth records as she won three gold medals at the Australian Championships, held in Melbourne in the 77kg division. Stowers broke the snatch record with 107kg, and the Clean and Jerk world youth record with a total of 137kg. At the 2025 Oceania Championship, she won two gold medals and set three Oceania youth records and three Oceania junior records. At the 2025 Pacific Mini Games in Palau, Stowers won three gold medals in the women’s 77kg category, and set 3 new Oceania records and 3 Pacific games records. She also won two silver medals and a bronze medal at the 2025 World Youth and Junior Weightlifting Championships in Lima, Peru, in the 76kg category. She also won a gold medal at the 2025 Commonwealth Weightlifting Championships in Ahmedabad, India.

Stowers won four gold medals at the 2026 Universal Weightlifting Championship in Samoa. Competing in the women's 77kg she lifted 142kg in the clean and jerk, a new junior world record, and 112kg in the snatch, also a new junior world record.

Stowers was selected to represent Samoa at the 2026 Commonwealth Games in Glasgow, Scotland, winning the gold medal in the 77 kg category, breaking the Commonwealth Games snatch record for the weight class with a lift of 107kg as well as a new Commonwealth Games total record of 237kg after the clean and jerk.
