= Ruben Katoatau =

I-Kiribati weightlifter (born 1997)

Personal information
- Nationality: I-Kiribati
- Born: 9 February 1997 (age 29)

Sport
- Sport: Weightlifting
Medal record
Men's weightlifting
Representing Kiribati
Pacific Games
Silver medal – second place	2019 Apia	67 kg
Commonwealth Championships
Bronze medal – third place	2019 Apia	67 kg
Oceania Championships
Gold medal – first place	2018 Le Mont-Dore	69 kg
Gold medal – first place	2025 Meyuns	79 kg
Silver medal – second place	2019 Apia	67 kg
Silver medal – second place	2026 Apia	79 kg
Bronze medal – third place	2021	73 kg

Ruben Katoatau (born 9 February 1997 in Nauru) is an I-Kiribati weightlifter.

His height is 158 cm for a weight of 68 kg. He finished 6th at Weightlifting Men's 69 kg in Gold Coast at the 2018 Commonwealth Games.

== Achievements ==
His previous main results were:

- 2017 Gold Coast, AUS Men's 69 kg 7th 117 152 269
- 2016 Penang, MAS Men's 62 kg 7th 110 147 257
- 2015 Pune, IND Men's 69 kg 8th 107 135 242
- 2014 at the 2014 Summer Youth Olympics.

Then, he participated at the 2019 World Weightlifting Championships – Men's 67 kg (snatch 30th).

His elder brother David Katoatau represented Kiribati in weightlifting, and was the first ever gold medallist of his country at the Glasgow 2014 Commonwealth Games (men's 105 kg), and has competed at three Olympic Games (2008, 2012, 2016).

At the IWF Absolute Continental Ranking – Oceania he finished just behind a Samoan weightlifter, which withdraw from the 2020 Olympic Games. Katoatau will replace him at 2020 Summer Olympics, in the men's 67 kg category.
