= Kiana Elliott =

Australian weightlifter (born 1997)

Personal information
- Full name: Kiana Rose Elliott
- Born: 27 July 1997 (age 29) Kogarah, New South Wales
- Weight: 66.41 kg (146.4 lb)

Sport
- Country: Australia
- Sport: Weightlifting
- Team: National team
Medal record
Women's weightlifting
Representing Australia
Pacific Games
Gold medal – first place	2019 Apia	64 kg
Bronze medal – third place	2015 Port Moresby	63 kg
Commonwealth Championships
Silver medal – second place	2019 Apia	64 kg
Oceania Championships
Gold medal – first place	2016 Suva	63 kg
Gold medal – first place	2019 Apia	64 kg
Gold medal – first place	2025 Meyuns	63 kg
Bronze medal – third place	2015 Port Moresby	63 kg
Arafura Games
Silver medal – second place	2019 Darwin	64 kg
- Updated on 24 January 2022

Kiana Rose Elliott (born 27 July 1997) is an Australian weightlifter, competing in the 69 kg category and representing Australia at international competitions.

Elliott was a promising gymnast, starting at the age of six. However, injuries caused her to give up the sport at the age of 14 and concentrate on weightlifting.

She has competed at world championships, including at the 2015 World Weightlifting Championships. She won the gold medal at the 2016 Oceania Weightlifting Championships.

Elliott represented Australia at the 2020 Summer Olympics in Tokyo, Japan. She competed in the women's 64 kg. She finished 5th in the Snatch and 11th in the Clean & Jerk.

She is coached by Martin Harlowe.

== Major results ==
Year	Venue	Weight	Snatch (kg)				Clean & Jerk (kg)				Total	Rank
Year	Venue	Weight	1	2	3	Rank	1	2	3	Rank	Total	Rank
World Championships
2015	Houston, United States	69 kg	~~85~~	85	89	36	103	107	~~111~~	34	196	33
Oceania Weightlifting Championships
2016	Suva, Fiji	63 kg	~~90~~	90	93	1st place, gold medalist(s)	107	~~113~~	~~113~~	1st place, gold medalist(s)	200	1st place, gold medalist(s)
Olympic Games
2021	Tokyo, Japan	64 kg	93	97	101	5	~~108~~	108	~~111~~	12	209	11
