= Meyuns =

- City
- Location in Palau
- Coordinates: 7.352°N 134.454°E
- Country: Palau
- State: Koror

Population
  - Total: 1,000
- Time zone: UTC+9 (Palau Standard Time)
- Area code: (+680) 488

Meyuns is the second most populous city of Palau, with a population of approximately 1,000. It is located in the state of Koror, where the nation's largest city, Koror, is located. Other than Koror, Meyuns is the only sizable city in the state of Koror. Unlike the city of Koror, Meyuns is on Ngerekebesang Island, along with the towns of Ngerekebesang and Echang (part of Southwest Islanders Village), although Meyuns is the only city that is incorporated on the island. It is linked by a causeway to Oreor Island, where the city of Koror is situated.

== Public institutions ==
Meyuns is the location of Belau National Hospital, the largest hospital in the country. Satellite office of the president is also located in Meuyns.

== Education ==
The Ministry of Education operates public schools.

Meyuns Elementary School was built circa 1969 and expanded in 1973. It was established due to the destruction of the Koror Elementary School in Koror by Typhoon Sally, which Meyuns students previously attended. The Trust Territory of the Pacific Islands administration was previously not interested in building a school in Meyuns.

Palau High School in Koror is the country's only public high school, it is attended by children from the Meyuns community.
