= Marshall Islands at the Olympics =

- Flag of the Marshall Islands
- IOC code: MHL
- NOC: Marshall Islands National Olympic Committee
- Website: www.oceaniasport.com/marshalls
- Medals: Gold 0 Silver 0 Bronze 0 Total 0

Summer appearances
- 2008; 2012; 2016; 2020; 2024; 2028

The Marshall Islands first competed in the Olympic Games at the 2008 Summer Olympics in Beijing, China. The nation has participated in every Summer Olympic Games since then, but has never competed in the Winter Olympic Games. The nation's Olympic Committee was established in 2001 and gained recognition by 2006 at an International Olympic Committee meeting. Fifteen different athletes have represented the Marshall Islands, of whom six have been the flag bearer for the nation as of the 2024 Summer Olympics.

The Marshall Islands have fielded athletes in swimming, taekwondo, weightlifting and athletics. The highest number of Marshallese athletes participating in a Summer Games is five at both the 2008 Games in Beijing and the 2016 Games in Rio de Janeiro, and the lowest number is two at the 2020 Summer Olympics in Tokyo. No athlete from the Marshall Islands has ever won a medal at the Olympics.

== Background ==
The Marshall Islands are a Micronesian island nation, located in the western Pacific Ocean midway between Hawaii and Australia. As of 2008 the islands had a population of approximately 60,000. The island nation was controlled by the United States, and prior to that by Japan and Germany at different times in its history, until gaining its sovereignty. In 1979, the Government of the Marshall Islands was officially established and the country became self-governing. In 1986 the Compact of Free Association with the United States entered into force, granting the Republic of the Marshall Islands (RMI) its sovereignty. The island nation is made up of twenty-nine atolls and five single islands.

The Marshall Islands National Olympic Committee (MINOC) was created in 2001, and gained recognition by the International Olympic Committee at their meeting in 2006. The MINOC brought the total number of National Olympic Committees (NOCs) to 203 at the time of their admittance.

== Olympic overview ==
=== 2008 Summer Olympics ===
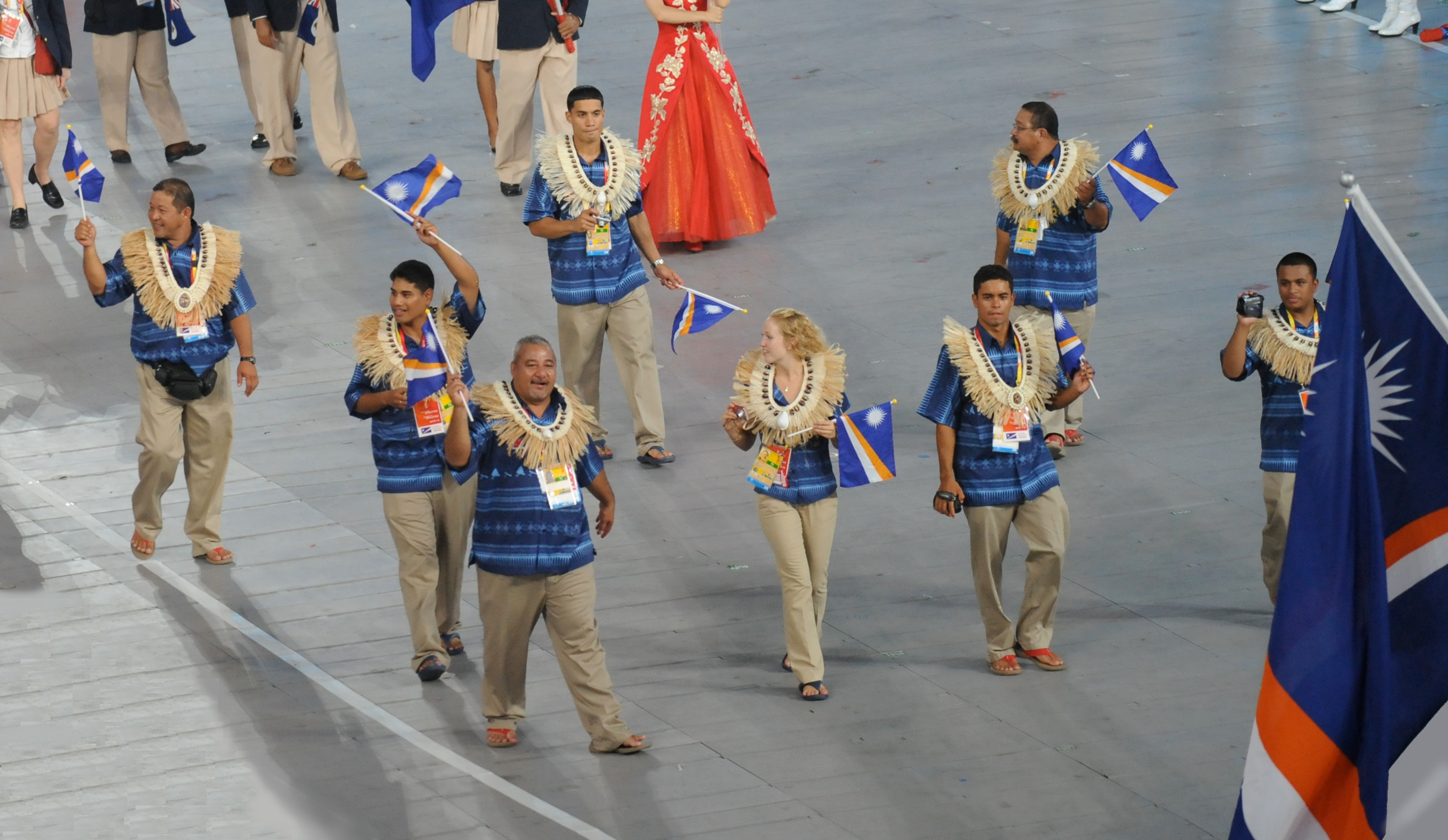
The Marshall Islands delegation during the 2008 Summer Olympics Parade of Nations

The Marshall Islands debuted at the 2008 Summer Olympic in Beijing, China, with five athletes competing in three sports. Roman William Cress and Haley Nemra represented the nation in the track and field events. Jared Heine and Julianne Kirchner competed in the swimming events. Anju Jason, who competed in taekwondo at the Games, is the only Marshallese athlete to have competed in taekwondo at the Olympics as of the 2016 Summer Olympics. Jason defeated a competitor from Samoa at the qualification tournament in New Caledonia; both athletes were wildcard entries, having failed to meet the qualification criteria for their respective events. Waylon Muller was the flag bearer for the nation.

Both Cress and Nemra failed to advance from their track and field heats: Cress finished eighth out of the nine athletes in his men's 100m heat with a time of 11.12 seconds, while Nemra finished seventh out of the eight athletes in her women's 800m heat in 2:18.83. Neither Heine or Kirchner managed to advance from their respective heats: Heine finished third in his men's 100m backstroke heat in a time of 58.86, placing forty-third in the standings; meanwhile Kirchner finished fourth in her women's 50 meter freestyle heat in a time of 30.42, placing seventy-fifth in the standings. Anju Jason competed in the men's welterweight division, where he was one of six athletes eliminated in tier eleven.

=== 2012 Summer Olympics ===
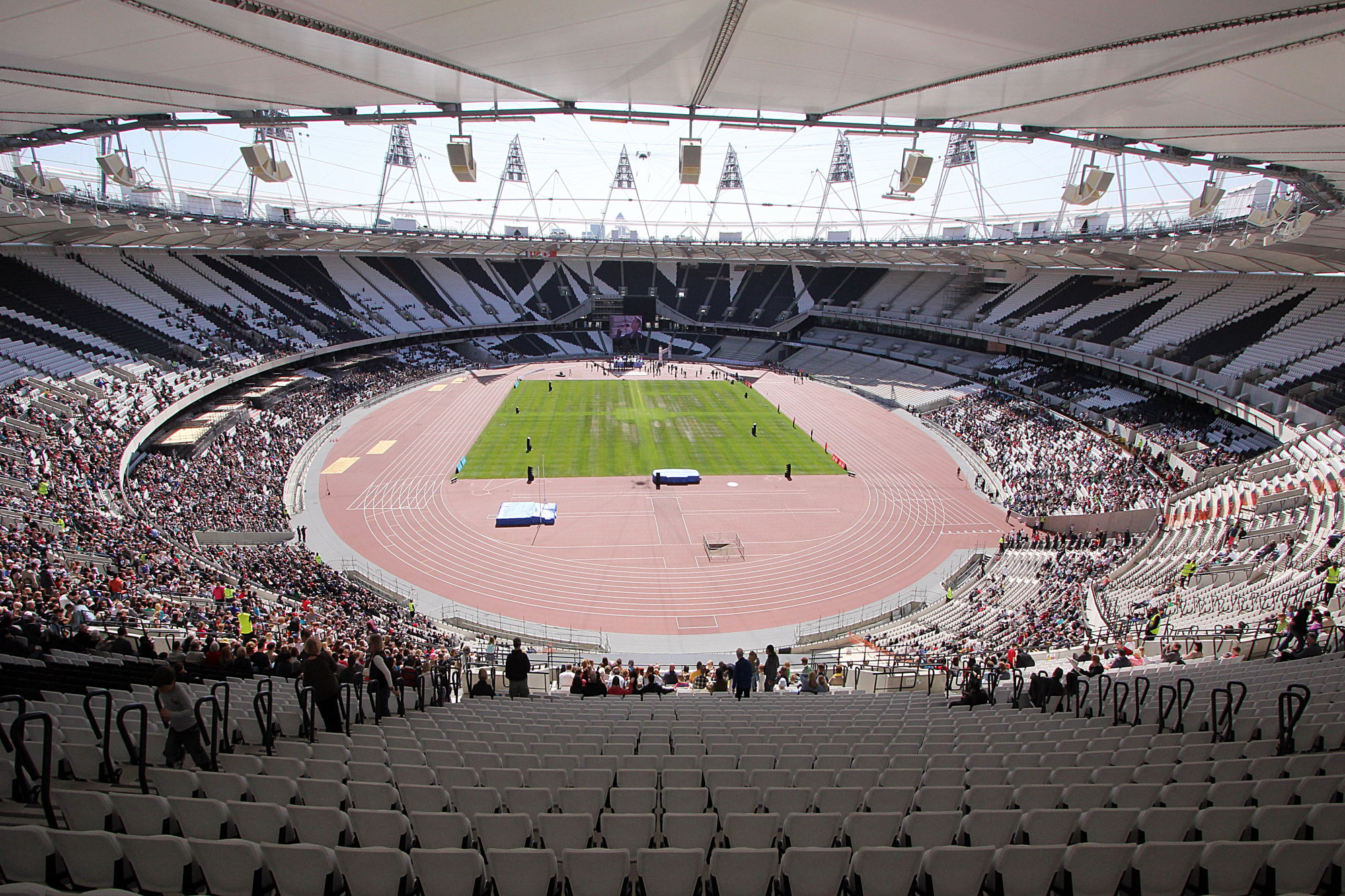
Both Nemra and Garstang competed at the London Olympic Stadium in the 2012 Summer Olympics.

The Marshall Islands sent four athletes to the 2012 Summer Olympics in London. Timi Garstang and Haley Nemra competed in the track and field events and Giordan Harris and Ann-Marie Hepler represented the nation in swimming at the Games. Before competing in the 2012 Summer Games, the Marshallese delegation attended a training camp in Australia for a month. Nemra was the flag bearer for the nation.

Both Garstang and Nemra failed to advance from their track and field heats: Garstang finished last out of the seven athletes in his men's 100m heat with a time of 12.81 seconds, while Nemra finished sixth out of the seven athletes in her women's 800m heat with a time of 2:14.90. Neither Harris or Hepler managed to advance from their respective heats: Harris finished sixth in his men's 50 meter freestyle heat in a time of 26.88 seconds, placing forty-sixth in the standings; meanwhile Hepler finished third in her women's 50 meter freestyle heat in a time of 28.06 seconds, placing forty-ninth in the rankings.

=== 2016 Summer Olympics ===
Five athletes from the Marshall Islands took part in the 2016 Summer Olympics in Rio de Janeiro, Brazil. Richson Simeon and Mariana Cress represented the nation in the track and field events. Giordan Harris and Colleen Furgeson competed in the swimming events. Mattie Sasser, who took part in weightlifting at the Games, was the first Marshallese athlete to compete in weightlifting at the Olympics and was the flag bearer.

Both Simeon and Cress failed to advance from their track and field heats: Simeon finished last out of the eight athletes in his men's 100m heat with a time of 11.81 seconds, while Cress finished sixth out of the eight athletes in her women's 100m heat with a time of 13.20 seconds. Neither Harris or Furgeson managed to advance from their respective heats: Harris finished fifth in his men's 50 meter freestyle heat in a time of 25.81 seconds, placing sixty-third in the standings; meanwhile Furgeson finished first in her women's 50 meter freestyle heat in a time of 28.16 seconds, placing fifty-eighth in the standings. Sasser finished eleventh in the women's 58 kg competition.

=== 2020 Summer Olympics ===
Only two athletes from the Marshall Islands took part in the 2020 Summer Olympics in Tokyo, Japan, as Colleen Furgeson and Phillip Kinono represented the nation in swimming at the Games and were the flag bearers. Both Furgeson and Kinono failed to advance from their respective heats: Furgeson finished fifth in her women's 100m heat in a time of 58.71 seconds, placing forty-fourth in the standings; meanwhile Kinono finished last in his men's 50 meter heat in a time of 27.86 seconds, placing seventieth in standings.

=== 2024 Summer Olympics ===
The Marshall Islands sent four athletes to the 2024 Summer Olympics in Paris, France. William Reed represented the nation in the track and field events and was the male flag bearer. Kayla Hepler and Phillip Kinono competed in the swimming events. Mattie Sasser represented the nation in weightlifting at the Olympics and was the female flag bearer.

Reed failed to advance from his track and field heat, as he finished sixth out of the seven athletes in his men's 100m heat with a time of 11.29 seconds. Neither Hepler or Kinono managed to advance from their respective heats: Hepler finished second in her women's 50 meter freestyle heat in a time of 30.33 seconds, placing sixty-second in the standings; meanwhile Kinono finished first in his men's 50 meter freestyle heat in a time of 27.43 seconds, placing sixty-fourth in the standings. Sasser finished tenth in the women's 59 kg competition.

== Medal tables ==
=== Medals by Summer Games ===
Games	Athletes	Gold	Silver	Bronze	Total	Rank
(China) 2008 Beijing	5	0	0	0	0	–
(United Kingdom) 2012 London	4	0	0	0	0	–
(Brazil) 2016 Rio de Janeiro	5	0	0	0	0	–
(Japan) 2020 Tokyo	2	0	0	0	0	–
(France) 2024 Paris	4	0	0	0	0	–
(United States) 2028 Los Angeles	future event					
(Australia) 2032 Brisbane	future event					
Total (5/30)	20	0	0	0	0	–

== See also ==
- List of participating nations at the Summer Olympic Games
- List of participating nations at the Winter Olympic Games
