= Marshall Islands National Olympic Committee =

- Country: Marshall Islands
- Code: MHL
- Created: c. 1991
- Recognized: 2006
- Continental Association: ONOC
- President: Anthony Muller
- Secretary General: Amy Sasser

The Marshall Islands National Olympic Committee (MINOC) is the National Olympic Committee representing the Marshall Islands. It was founded c. 1991 and became a full member of the International Olympic Committee and the Olympic Movement on February 9, 2006. The MINOC initially applied for recognition in 1991 but were rejected in 1993 after a series of assessments were conducted and it was deemed not ready for membership. At their recognition, they had the national sporting bodies of athletics, basketball, softball, swimming, tennis, table tennis, volleyball, weightlifting, and wrestling recognized by their respective international governing bodies. The current president has been Anthony Muller since 2022. The MINOC is a signatory to the World Anti-Doping Code published by the World Anti-Doping Agency.

== History ==
The Marshall Islands National Olympic Committee (MINOC) was founded c. 1991 (Note: No available sources describe the MINOC's founding date.) and applied for International Olympic Committee (IOC) recognition the same year. Paul Wallwork, then-IOC member of Samoa, took up their case in 1993 for the IOC to conduct a series of assessments on the nation to determine their eligibility. They were initially rejected the same year after the IOC determined they were ineligible. The IOC’s response was that all citizens of the Marshall Islands hold dual citizenship with the United States, meaning the United States could hypothetically send a second team to the Olympic Games. Olympedia later opined that this was an unusual response at the time, as other competing National Olympic Committees (NOCs) such as American Samoa, Guam, and Puerto Rico, where all citizens hold United States nationality, (Note: Native-born residents of American Samoa are not United States citizens unless they have a citizen parent. They instead are United States nationals, who hold many but not all of the rights of citizenship. By contrast, native-born residents of Guam and Puerto Rico are U.S. citizens by birth. See the dedicated pages on citizenship and nationality in American Samoa, Guam, and Puerto Rico.) were nonetheless recognized by the IOC as separate entities.

The MINOC was formally recognized by the Oceania National Olympic Committees in 2005. The IOC executive board proposed recognition of the MINOC on January 30, 2006, where their case was examined for a few days before formal approval. On February 9, 2006, The MINOC became the 203rd IOC member at the 118th IOC session in Turin, Italy, by acclamation. They were the 16th and second-to-last Oceanian nation to be recognized by the IOC, gaining recognition before Tuvalu. Before being recognized by the IOC, the MINOC already had the affiliations of the international governing bodies of athletics, basketball, softball, (Note: The then-existing governing body for softball, the International Softball Federation, would merge with the governing body for baseball in 2013 to establish the current World Baseball Softball Confederation.) swimming, tennis, table tennis, volleyball, weightlifting, and wrestling. After recognition, they received financial assistance and scholarships from the IOC amounting to around $100,000 before the 2008 Summer Games, which fundamentally amounts to the MINOC's entire budget.

== Facilities and management ==
In 2008, MINOC secretary general Terry Sasser said that the nation has running tracks made of grass and four to five gyms with indoor basketball courts. The Majuro Track and Field Stadium, which the MINOC is a tenant of, is used for track and field and soccer. The stadium started construction in 2019 and was opened in 2024.

The first president of the MINOC was Kenneth Kramer, who was elected in 2009 and served until 2022 before former MINOC treasurer Anthony Muller took over and still holds the position as of 2025. Terry Sasser worked as the secretary general until Amy Sasser was elected in 2022. The MINOC is a signatory to the World Anti-Doping Code published by the World Anti-Doping Agency.

== Events ==
=== Olympic Games ===
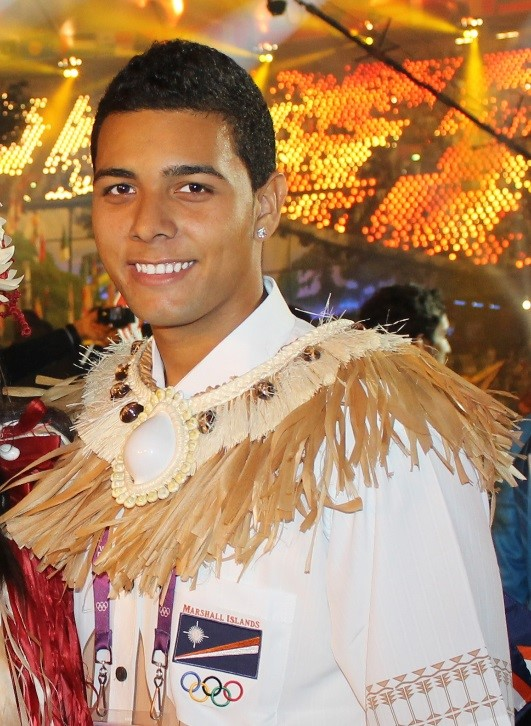
Giordan Harris competed in swimming for the nation at two Olympic Games.

The Marshall Islands participates in the Olympic Games in the Summer Olympics and have not competed at the Winter Olympics. The nation entered the Olympic Games for the first time at the 2008 Summer Games in Beijing, China. The delegation featured five athletes who lived in different nations, competing across athletics, swimming, and taekwondo. All athletes failed to progress further from their first rounds. Four years later, at the 2012 Summer Games, four athletes were sent, two each in athletics and swimming. All athletes also failed to progress further from their first rounds.

The nation made their debut in weightlifting at the next games, where the nation received their then-highest placement by Mattie Sasser, who placed 11th in the women's 58 kg event with a total of 199 kilograms. They also sent athletes in swimming and athletics but they also failed to progress further from their first rounds. The nation had their smallest delegation so far at the 2020 Summer Games where they sent two swimmers who also failed to progress further from their first rounds. Their highest placement came at the 2024 Summer Games, where Sasser placed tenth in the women's 59 kg event with a total of 209 kilograms. Continuing, the athletics and swimming competitors for the nation at the games also failed to progress further.

The nation also supplied delegations for the Youth Olympic Games in the Summer editions. They made their debut at the inaugural games in 2010 and have competed ever since. The MINOC has supplied athletes in athletics, swimming, weightlifting, and wrestling, with their best placements coming from wrestlers Ilania Keju and Alexander Adiniwin placing sixth at the 2014 and 2018 editions respectively.

== Affiliated sports ==
Sports governing bodies affiliated to the Marshall Islands National Olympic Committee
| Sport | Body | Federation | Refs |
|---|---|---|---|
| Athletics | Marshall Islands Athletics Federation | WA | |
| Baseball/Softball | Marshall Islands Baseball Softball Federation | WBSC | |
| Basketball | Marshall Islands Basketball Federation | FIBA | |
| Swimming | Marshall Islands Swimming Federation | AQUA | |
| Table tennis | Marshall Islands Table Tennis Association | ITTF | |
| Taekwondo | Marshall Islands Taekwondo Federation | WT | |
| Tennis | Marshall Islands Tennis Association | ITF | |
| Volleyball | Marshall Islands Volleyball Federation | FIVB | |
| Weightlifting | Marshall Islands Weightlifting Federation | IWF | |
| Wrestling | Marshall Islands Wrestling Federation | UWW | |
