= Marshall Islands at the 2012 Summer Olympics =

- Flag of the Marshall Islands
- IOC code: MHL
- NOC: Marshall Islands National Olympic Committee
- Website: www.oceaniasport.com/marshalls

in London
- Competitors: 4 in 2 sports
- Flag bearer (opening): Haley Nemra
- Flag bearer (closing): Giordan Harris
- Medals: Gold 0 Silver 0 Bronze 0 Total 0

Summer Olympics appearances (overview)
- 2008; 2012; 2016; 2020; 2024

The Marshall Islands marked its second consecutive Olympiad, at the 2012 Summer Olympics in London, from July 27 to August 12, 2012. The Olympian delegation included two men and two women, one male and one female athlete in athletics (track and field) and one male and one female athlete in swimming. Middle-distance runner Haley Nemra was honored as the national flag bearer at the opening ceremony. The Marshall Islands continued their streak of bringing home no medals.

== History ==
The Marshall Islands debuted at the 2008 in Beijing, China, with a five Olympian delegation. The athletes prepared for the London Games at a month long training camp in Australia.

The Marshall Islands created its National Olympic Committee in 2001, and gained International Olympic Committee (IOC) recognition in 2006 during the IOC's meeting on February 9, 2006 in Turin, Italy. The addition of the Marshall Islands along with Montenegro and Tuvalu the following year brought the total number of nations competing at the 2008 Summer Olympics to 205.

== Athletics ==
The Marshall Islands were represented by one male and one female athlete at the 2012 Summer Olympics in athletics: Timi Garstang and Haley Nemra. This was the first Olympic appearance for Garstang and the second for Nemra. Nemra previously competed in the women's 800 meter at the 2008 Summer Olympics in Beijing. Namara was also the flag bearer for these Olympic Games.

Timi Garstang competed in the men's 100 meter, where he finished last out of seven athletes in his heat. The medals for the event went to athletes from Jamaica and the United States.

Haley Nemara participated in the women's 800 meter, where she came sixth out of seven athletes in her heat. The medals in the discipline went to athletes from Russia and South Africa.

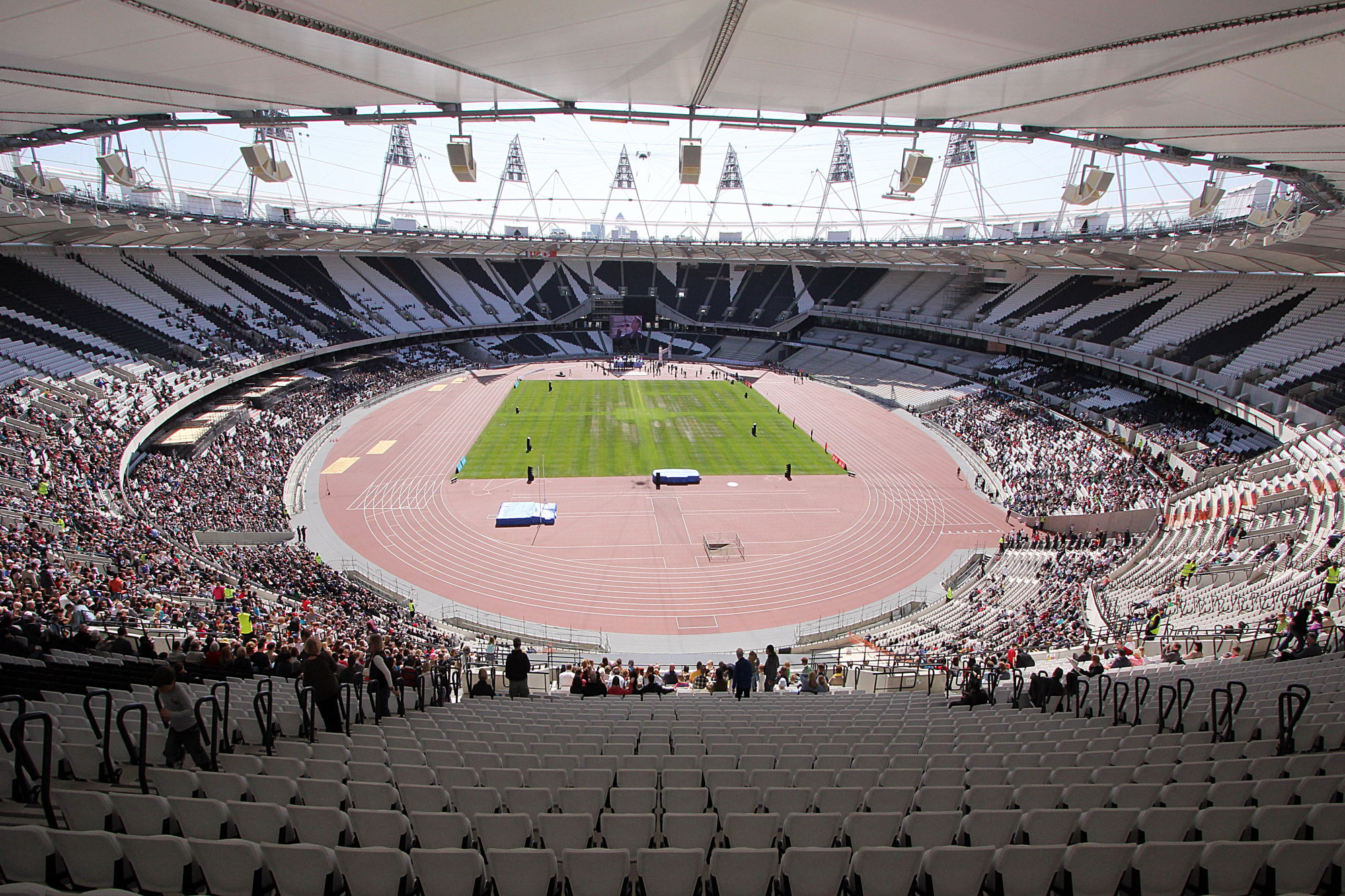
Both Nemara and Garstang competed at London Olympic Stadium in the 2012 Summer Olympics.

Note–Ranks given for track events are within the athlete's heat only

=== Men ===
Athlete	Event	Heat		Quarterfinal		Semifinal		Final	
Athlete	Event	Result	Rank	Result	Rank	Result	Rank	Result	Rank
Timi Garstang	100 m	12.81	7	did not advance					

=== Women ===
Athlete	Event	Heat		Semifinal		Final	
Athlete	Event	Result	Rank	Result	Rank	Result	Rank
Haley Nemra	800 m	2:14.90	6	did not advance			

== Swimming ==
The Marshall Islands were represented by one male and one female athlete at the 2012 Summer Olympics in swimming: Giordan Harris and Ann-Marie Hepler. This was the first Olympic appearance for both Harris and Hepler.

Giordan Harris competed in the men's 50 meter freestyle, where he finished sixth in his heat and placed forty-sixth in the standings. The medals in the event went to athletes from France, the United States, and Brazil.

Ann-Marie Hepler partook in the women's 50 meter freestyle, where she placed third in her heat and ranked forty-ninth in the standings. The medals in the event went to athletes from the Netherlands, and Belarus.

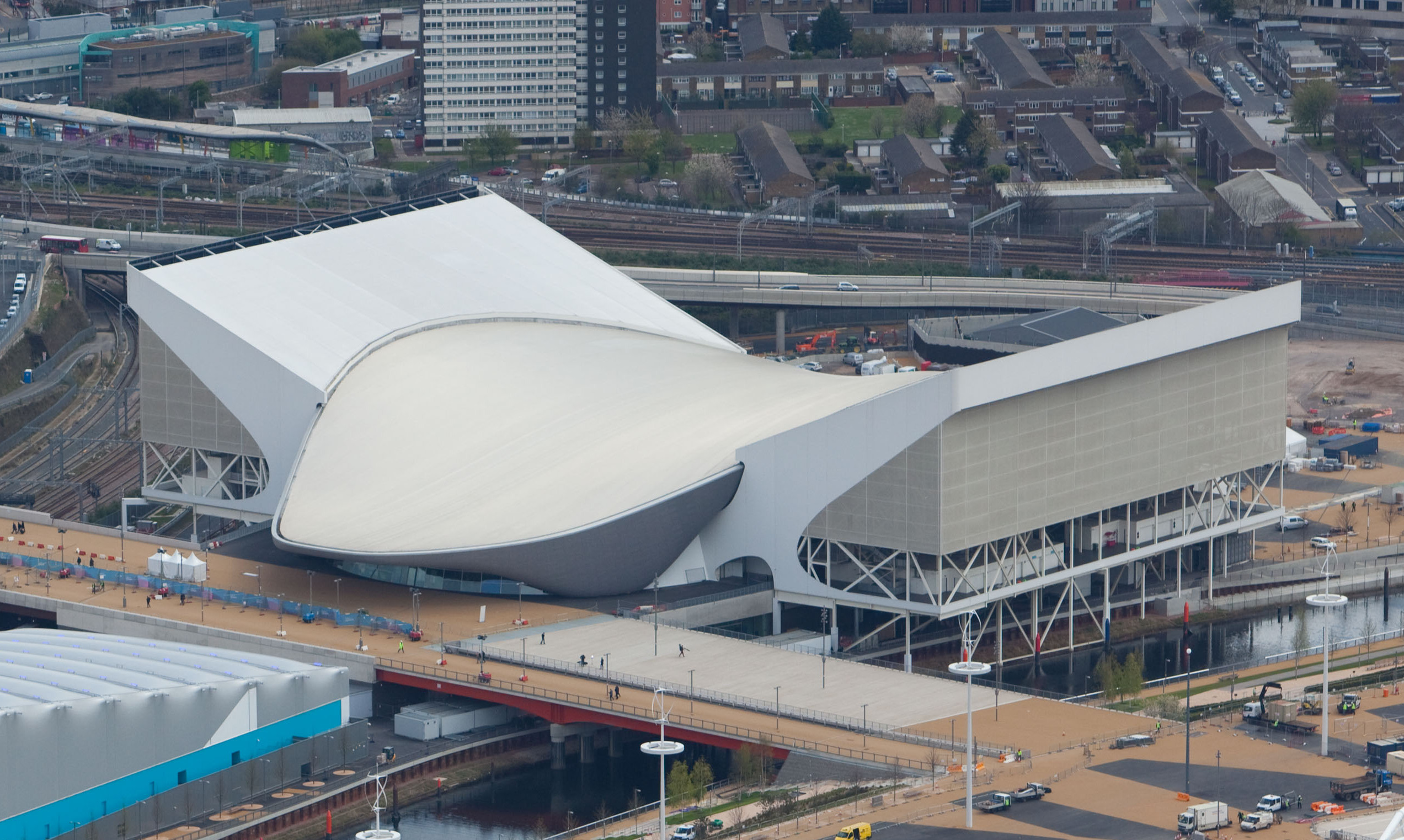
The London Aquatics Centre where the swimming events were held during the 2012 Summer Olympics in London

Athlete	Event	Heat		Semifinal		Final	
Athlete	Event	Time	Rank	Time	Rank	Time	Rank
Giordan Harris	50 m freestyle	26.88	46	did not advance			
Ann-Marie Hepler	50 m freestyle	28.06	49	did not advance			
