= List of Marshall Islands records in Olympic weightlifting =

The following are the records of the Marshall Islands in Olympic weightlifting. Records are maintained in each weight class for the snatch lift, clean and jerk lift, and the total for both lifts by the Marshall Islands Weightlifting Federation (AWF).

== Current records ==
=== Men ===
Event	Record	Athlete	Date	Meet	Place	Ref
60 kg
Snatch	93 kg	Mike Riklon	27 April 2026	Oceania Championships	Apia, Samoa	
Clean & Jerk	110 kg	Mike Riklon	27 April 2026	Oceania Championships	Apia, Samoa	
Total	203 kg	Mike Riklon	27 April 2026	Oceania Championships	Apia, Samoa	
65 kg
Snatch						
Clean & Jerk						
Total						
71 kg
Snatch						
Clean & Jerk						
Total						
79 kg
Snatch						
Clean & Jerk						
Total						
88 kg
Snatch						
Clean & Jerk						
Total						
94 kg
Snatch	121 kg	Atantaake Jans Massey	30 April 2026	Oceania Championships	Apia, Samoa	
Clean & Jerk	151 kg	Atantaake Jans Massey	30 April 2026	Oceania Championships	Apia, Samoa	
Total	272 kg	Atantaake Jans Massey	30 April 2026	Oceania Championships	Apia, Samoa	
110 kg
Snatch						
Clean & Jerk						
Total						
+110 kg
Snatch						
Clean & Jerk						
Total						

== Historical records ==
=== Men (2018–2025) ===
Event	Record	Athlete	Date	Meet	Place	Ref
55 kg
Snatch	96 kg	Mike Riklon	20 November 2023	Pacific Games	Honiara, Solomon Islands	
Clean & Jerk	116 kg	Mike Riklon	20 November 2023	Pacific Games	Honiara, Solomon Islands	
Total	212 kg	Mike Riklon	20 November 2023	Pacific Games	Honiara, Solomon Islands	
61 kg
Snatch	98 kg	Petterson River	20 November 2023	Pacific Games	Honiara, Solomon Islands	
Clean & Jerk	126 kg	Petterson River	20 November 2023	Pacific Games	Honiara, Solomon Islands	
Total	224 kg	Petterson River	20 November 2023	Pacific Games	Honiara, Solomon Islands	
67 kg
Snatch						
Clean & Jerk						
Total						
73 kg
Snatch						
Clean & Jerk						
Total						
81 kg
Snatch	130 kg	Kabuati Bob	11 December 2019	World Cup	Tianjin, China	
Clean & Jerk	160 kg	Kabuati Bob	July 2019	Pacific Games	Apia, Samoa	
Total	288 kg	Kabuati Bob	July 2019	Pacific Games	Apia, Samoa	
89 kg
Snatch						
Clean & Jerk						
Total						
96 kg
Snatch						
Clean & Jerk						
Total						
102 kg
Snatch						
Clean & Jerk						
Total						
109 kg
Snatch						
Clean & Jerk						
Total						
+109 kg
Snatch						
Clean & Jerk						
Total						

=== Women (2018–2025) ===
Event	Record	Athlete	Date	Meet	Place	Ref
45 kg
Snatch						
Clean & Jerk						
Total						
49 kg
Snatch						
Clean & Jerk						
Total						
55 kg
Snatch						
Clean & Jerk						
Total						
59 kg
Snatch	99 kg	Mathlynn Sasser	3 April 2024	World Cup	Phuket, Thailand	
Clean & Jerk	120 kg	Mathlynn Sasser	10 June 2023	IWF Grand Prix	Havana, Cuba	
Total	216 kg	Mathlynn Sasser	3 April 2024	World Cup	Phuket, Thailand	
64 kg
Snatch	72 kg	Takeniti Atantaake	21 November 2023	Pacific Games	Honiara, Solomon Islands	
Clean & Jerk	95 kg	Takeniti Atantaake	21 November 2023	Pacific Games	Honiara, Solomon Islands	
Total	167 kg	Takeniti Atantaake	21 November 2023	Pacific Games	Honiara, Solomon Islands	
71 kg
Snatch						
Clean & Jerk						
Total						
76 kg
Snatch						
Clean & Jerk						
Total						
81 kg
Snatch						
Clean & Jerk						
Total						
87 kg
Snatch						
Clean & Jerk						
Total						
+87 kg
Snatch						
Clean & Jerk						
Total						

== Historical records ==
=== Men (1998–2018) ===
Event	Record	Athlete	Date	Meet	Place	Ref
56 kg
Snatch						
Clean & Jerk						
Total						
62 kg
Snatch						
Clean & Jerk						
Total						
69 kg
Snatch						
Clean & Jerk						
Total						
77 kg
Snatch						
Clean & Jerk						
Total						
85 kg
Snatch	125 kg	Kabuati Bob	6 December 2017	Pacific Mini Games	Port Vila, Vanuatu	
Clean & Jerk	165 kg	Kabuati Bob	22 September 2017	Asian Indoor and Martial Arts Games	Ashgabat, Turkmenistan	
Total	288 kg	Kabuati Bob	22 September 2017	Asian Indoor and Martial Arts Games	Ashgabat, Turkmenistan	
-94 kg
Snatch						
Clean & Jerk						
Total						
-105 kg
Snatch						
Clean & Jerk						
Total						
+105 kg
Snatch						
Clean & Jerk						
Total						

=== Women (1998–2018) ===
Event	Record	Athlete	Date	Meet	Place	Ref
48 kg
Snatch						
Clean & Jerk						
Total						
53 kg
Snatch						
Clean & Jerk						
Total						
58 kg
Snatch	87 kg	Mathlynn Sasser	8 August 2016	Olympic Games	Rio de Janeiro, Brazil	
Clean & Jerk	114 kg	Mathlynn Sasser	25 May 2016	Oceania Championships	Suva, Fiji	
Total	199 kg	Mathlynn Sasser	8 August 2016	Olympic Games	Rio de Janeiro, Brazil	
63 kg
Snatch	96 kg	Mathlynn Sasser	5 December 2017	Pacific Mini Games	Port Vila, Vanuatu	
Clean & Jerk	123 kg	Mathlynn Sasser	5 December 2017	Pacific Mini Games	Port Vila, Vanuatu	
Total	219 kg	Mathlynn Sasser	5 December 2017	Pacific Mini Games	Port Vila, Vanuatu	
69 kg
Snatch						
Clean & Jerk						
Total						
75 kg
Snatch						
Clean & Jerk						
Total						
+75 kg
Snatch						
Clean & Jerk						
Total						
