= Marshall Islands at the 2016 Summer Olympics =

- Flag of the Marshall Islands
- IOC code: MHL
- NOC: Marshall Islands National Olympic Committee
- Website: www.oceaniasport.com/marshalls

in Rio de Janeiro
- Competitors: 5 in 3 sports
- Flag bearer: Mathlynn Sasser
- Medals: Gold 0 Silver 0 Bronze 0 Total 0

Summer Olympics appearances (overview)
- 2008; 2012; 2016; 2020; 2024

The Marshall Islands competed at the 2016 Summer Olympics in Rio de Janeiro, Brazil, from 5 to 21 August 2016. This was the nation's third consecutive appearance at the Summer Olympics.

The Marshall Islands Olympic delegation included five athletes, competing only in athletics, swimming, and weightlifting. Among them were freestyle swimmer Giordan Harris, the lone returning Olympian from London 2012, and weightlifter Mathlynn Sasser (women's 58 kg), who led the contingent as the Marshall Islands flag bearer in the opening ceremony. The Marshall Islands made their Olympic debut in weightlifting and had one of their largest Olympic delegations, matching their size in 2008. The delegation, however, failed to win their first-ever Olympic medal.

== History ==
The Marshall Islands are a Micronesian island nation, located in the western Pacific Ocean midway between Hawaii and Australia. As of 2016 the nation had a population of approximately 53,000. The islands were under Spain's influence until their annexation by Germany in 1885. Japan occupied the Islands during World War I and formally annexed them as part of its interwar South Seas Mandate. The Marshall Islands were placed under United States control in 1944. The islands granted independence in 1986 under a Compact of Free Association with the United States.

The Marshall Islands created its National Olympic Committee in 2001 and gained International Olympic Committee (IOC) recognition at their 9 February 2006 meeting. The addition of the Marshall Islands brought the total number of IOC-recognized National Olympic Committees to 203 at the time of admission.

== Athletics ==
The Marshall Islands received universality slots from the International Association of Athletics Federations (IAAF) to send one male, and one female athlete, to the 2016 Summer Olympics. Richson Simeon represented the Marshall Islands in the men's 100 meter competition, and Mariana Cress represented the nation in the women's 100 meter.

Both athletes failed to advance to their next rounds, with Simeon placing eighth in his heat with a time of 11:81, and Cress placing sixth with a time of 13:20. Jamaica and the United States won medals in both competitions, and Canada received one for the men's event.

Key

- Note–Ranks given for track events are within the athlete's heat only
- Q = Qualified for the next round
- q = Qualified for the next round as a fastest loser or, in field events, by position without achieving the qualifying target
- NR = National record
- N/A = Round not applicable for the event
- Bye = Athlete not required to compete in round

Track & road events

Athlete	Event	Heat		Quarterfinal		Semifinal		Final	
Athlete	Event	Time	Rank	Time	Rank	Time	Rank	Time	Rank
Richson Simeon	Men's 100 m	11.81	8	Did not advance					
Mariana Cress	Women's 100 m	13.20	6	Did not advance					

== Swimming ==
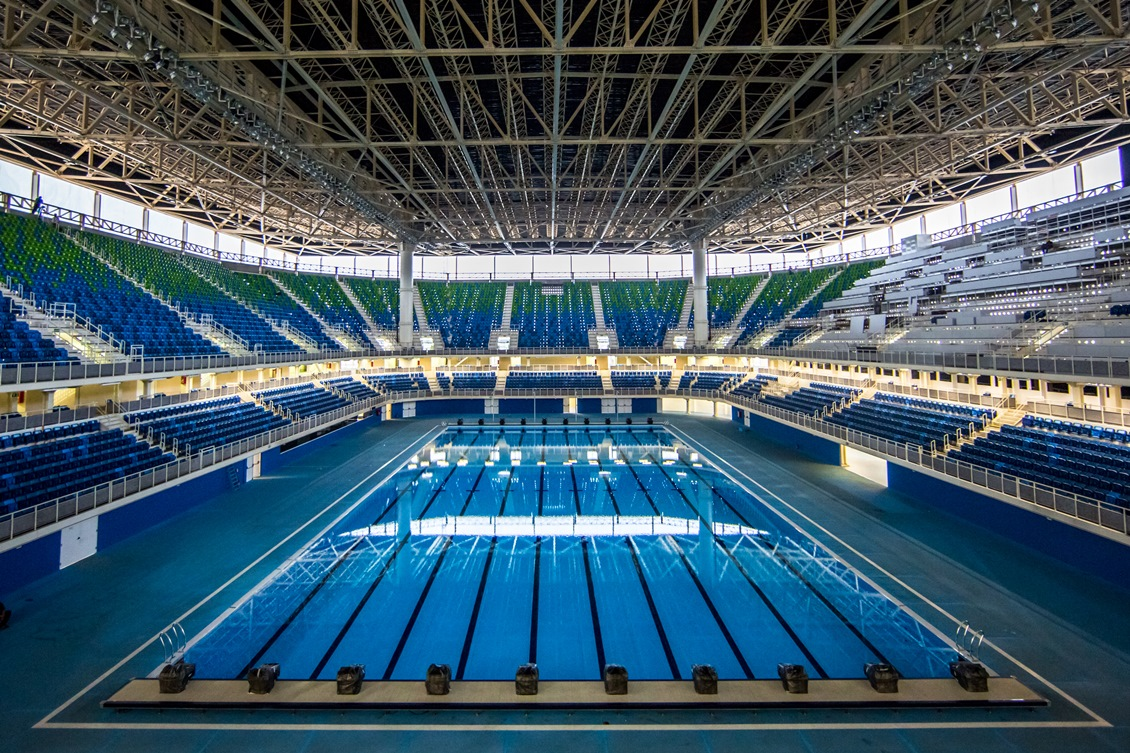
Olympic Aquatics Stadium where Harris and Furgeson competed in the 2016 Summer Olympics

The Marshall Islands received universality invitations from FINA to send one male and one female swimmer to the 2016 Summer Olympics.

Giordan Harris placed fifth in his heat for the men's 50 meter freestyle with a time of 25:81 and Colleen Furgeson placed first in the women's 50 meter freestyle with a time of 28:16, but both failed to advance to the next round.

The United States won medals in both events, with France receiving a medal for the men's and Denmark and Belarus receiving medals for the women's competitions.

Athlete	Event	Heat		Semifinal		Final	
Athlete	Event	Time	Rank	Time	Rank	Time	Rank
Giordan Harris	Men's 50 m freestyle	25.81	63	Did not advance			
Colleen Furgeson	Women's 50 m freestyle	28.16	58	Did not advance			

== Weightlifting ==
The Marshall Islands received an invitation from the Tripartite Commission for Mathlynn Sasser to compete in the women's lightweight category (58 kg), signifying the nation's Olympic weightlifting debut. Sasser had a total score of 199, placing eleventh. The medals in the event went to athletes from Thailand and Chinese Taipei.

Athlete	Event	Snatch		Clean & jerk		Total	Rank
Athlete	Event	Result	Rank	Result	Rank	Total	Rank
Mathlynn Sasser	Women's −58 kg	87	11	112	10	199	11
