= Marshall Islands at the 2008 Summer Olympics =

- Flag of the Marshall Islands
- IOC code: MHL
- NOC: Marshall Islands National Olympic Committee
- Website: www.oceaniasport.com/marshalls

in Beijing
- Competitors: 5 in 3 sports
- Flag bearer: Waylon Muller
- Medals: Gold 0 Silver 0 Bronze 0 Total 0

Summer Olympics appearances (overview)
- 2008; 2012; 2016; 2020; 2024; 2028

The Marshall Islands took part in the 2008 Summer Olympics, which were held in Beijing, China from 8 to 24 August 2008. The 2008 Summer Olympics were the Marshall Islands' first appearance at the Olympics. The delegation included five athletes, two in athletics, two in swimming, and one in taekwondo. The Marshall Islands failed to win an Olympic medal at these Games.

Athletes representing the Marshall Islands participated in four different events. Anju Jason was the first Marshallese athlete ever to qualify for the Olympic Games. Jason was the only athlete to meet the qualification standards, the other five athletes at the Games were all wildcard entries. He represented his country in taekwondo. Jared Heine is a swimmer and competed in the 100 meter backstroke. In athletics, the nation was represented by Roman Cress who ran in the men's 100 meters. Haley Nemra also represented the Marshall Islands running in the women's 800 meters.

== History ==
The Marshall Islands are a Micronesian island nation, located in the western Pacific Ocean midway between Hawaii and Australia. As of 2008 the island had a population of approximately 60,000. The island nation was controlled by the United States, and prior to that by Japan and Germany at different times in its history, until gaining its sovereignty. In 1979, the Government of the Marshall Islands was officially established and the country became self-governing. In 1986 the Compact of Free Association with the United States entered into force, granting the Republic of the Marshall Islands (RMI) its sovereignty. The island nation is made up of twenty-nine atolls and five single islands.

The Marshall Islands National Olympic Committee gained International Olympic Committee recognition in 2006 during the IOC's meeting on February 9, 2006. The admittance of the Marshall Islands, along with Montenegro (who participated as Serbia and Montenegro at the 2004 Summer Olympics) and Tuvalu the following year, brought the total number of nations competing in the 2008 Olympics to 205. The 2008 Summer Olympics were held from 8 to 24 August 2008.

== Athletics (track and field) ==
The Marshall Islands were represented by a male athlete and a female athlete in athletics at the 2008 Summer Olympics, Roman William Cress and Haley Nemra. This was the first appearance for either athlete at the Olympics. Neither Nemara or Cress met the qualification criteria for their events, however they were accepted as wildcard entries into the Olympics.

Roman Cress competed in the men's 100 meters, where he finished eighth out of the nine athletes in his heat, failing to advance to the next round. The medals in the event went to athletes from Jamaica, Trinidad and Tobago, and the United States.

Haley Nemra competed in the women's 800 meters, where she finished seventh out of the eight athletes in her heat, failing to advance to the next round. The medals in the event went to athletes from Kenya and Morocco.

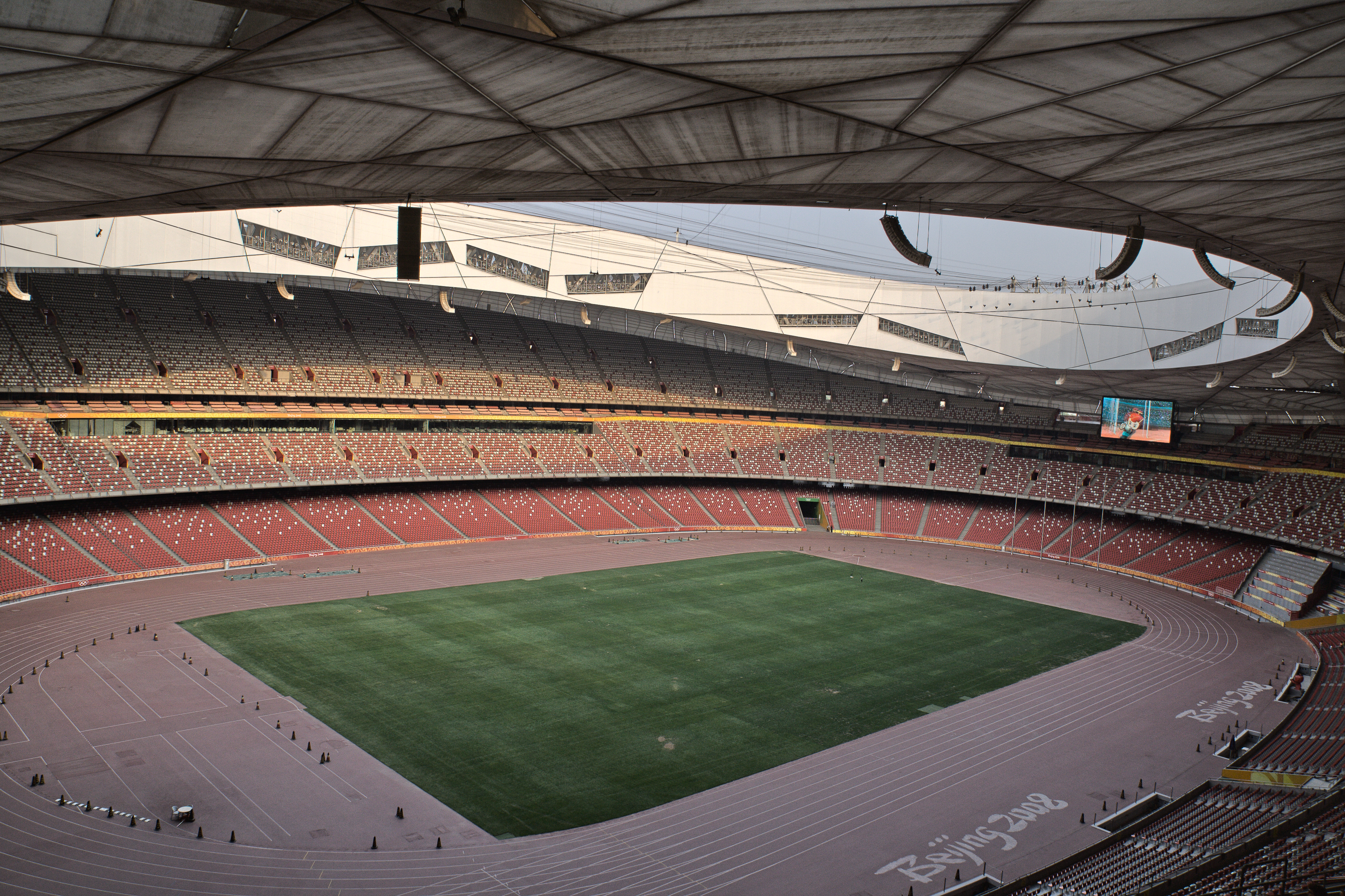
Cress and Nemra both competed at the Beijing National Stadium during the 2008 Summer Olympics.

Note–Ranks given for track events are within the athlete's heat only

=== Men ===
Athlete	Event	Heat		Quarterfinal		Semifinal		Final	
Athlete	Event	Result	Rank	Result	Rank	Result	Rank	Result	Rank
Roman William Cress	100 m	11.18	8	Did not advance					

=== Women ===
Athlete	Event	Heat		Quarterfinal		Semifinal		Final	
Athlete	Event	Result	Rank	Result	Rank	Result	Rank	Result	Rank
Haley Nemra	800 m	2:18.83	7	Did not advance					

== Swimming ==
The Marshall Islands were represented by two swimmers at the 2008 Summer Olympics, one male Jared Heine and one female Julianne Kirchner. This was the first Olympic appearance for both athletes. Neither Heine or Kirchner met the qualification criteria for their respective events, however they were accepted as wildcard entries.

Jared Heine competed in the men's 100 meter backstroke and finished third in his heat, placing forty-third in the standings. The medals in the event went to swimmers from the United States, Russia, and Australia.

Julianne Kirchner competed in the women's 50 meter freestyle and finished fourth in her heat, placing seventy-fifth in the standings. The medals in the event went to swimmers from Germany, the United States, and Australia.

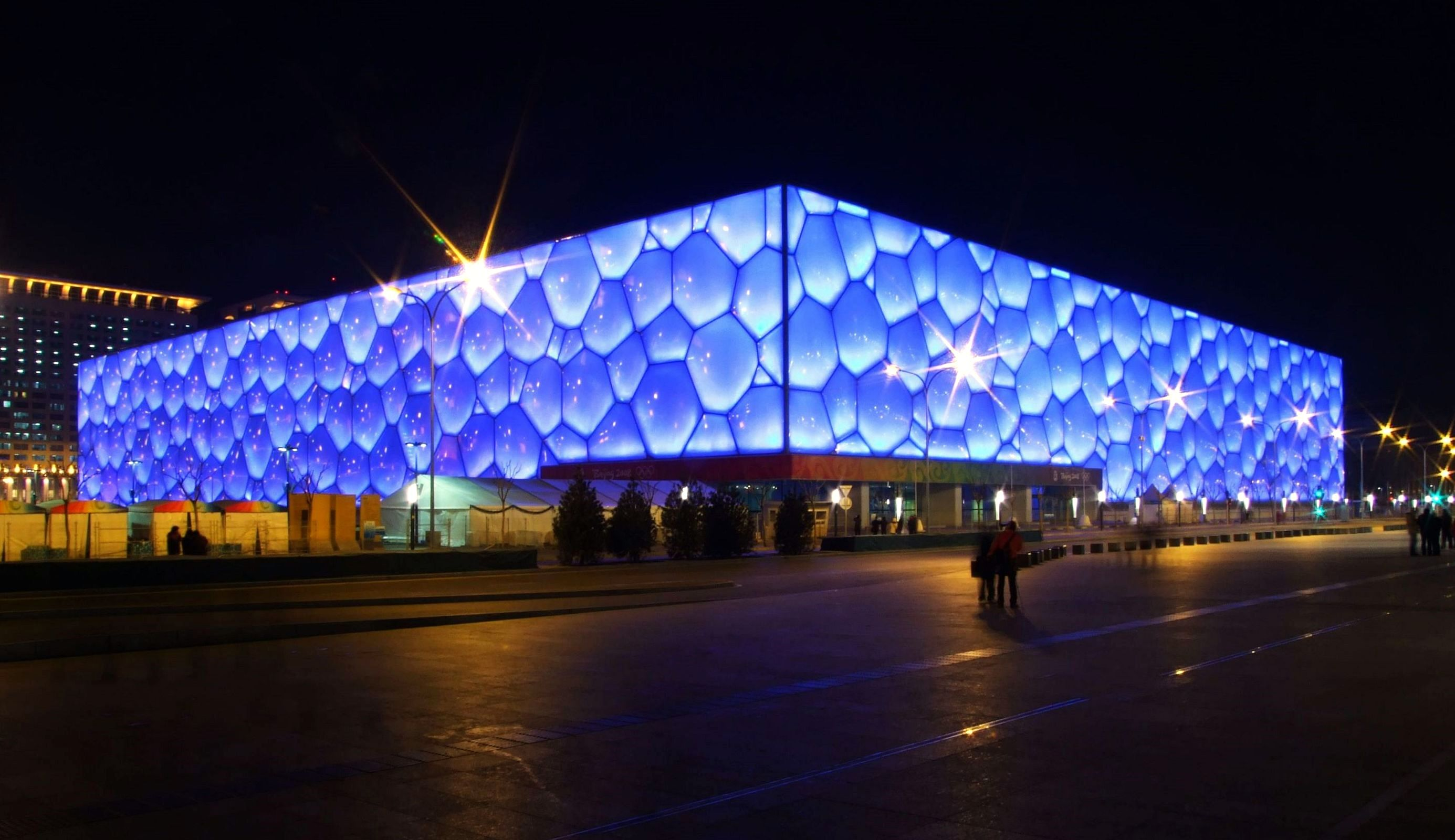
The swimming events for the 2008 Summer Olympics were held at the Beijing National Aquatics Center.

Men

Athlete	Event	Heat		Semifinal		Final	
Athlete	Event	Time	Rank	Time	Rank	Time	Rank
Jared Heine	100 m backstroke	58.86	43	Did not advance			

Women

Athlete	Event	Heat		Semifinal		Final	
Athlete	Event	Time	Rank	Time	Rank	Time	Rank
Julianne Kirchner	50 m freestyle	30.42	75	Did not advance			

== Taekwondo ==
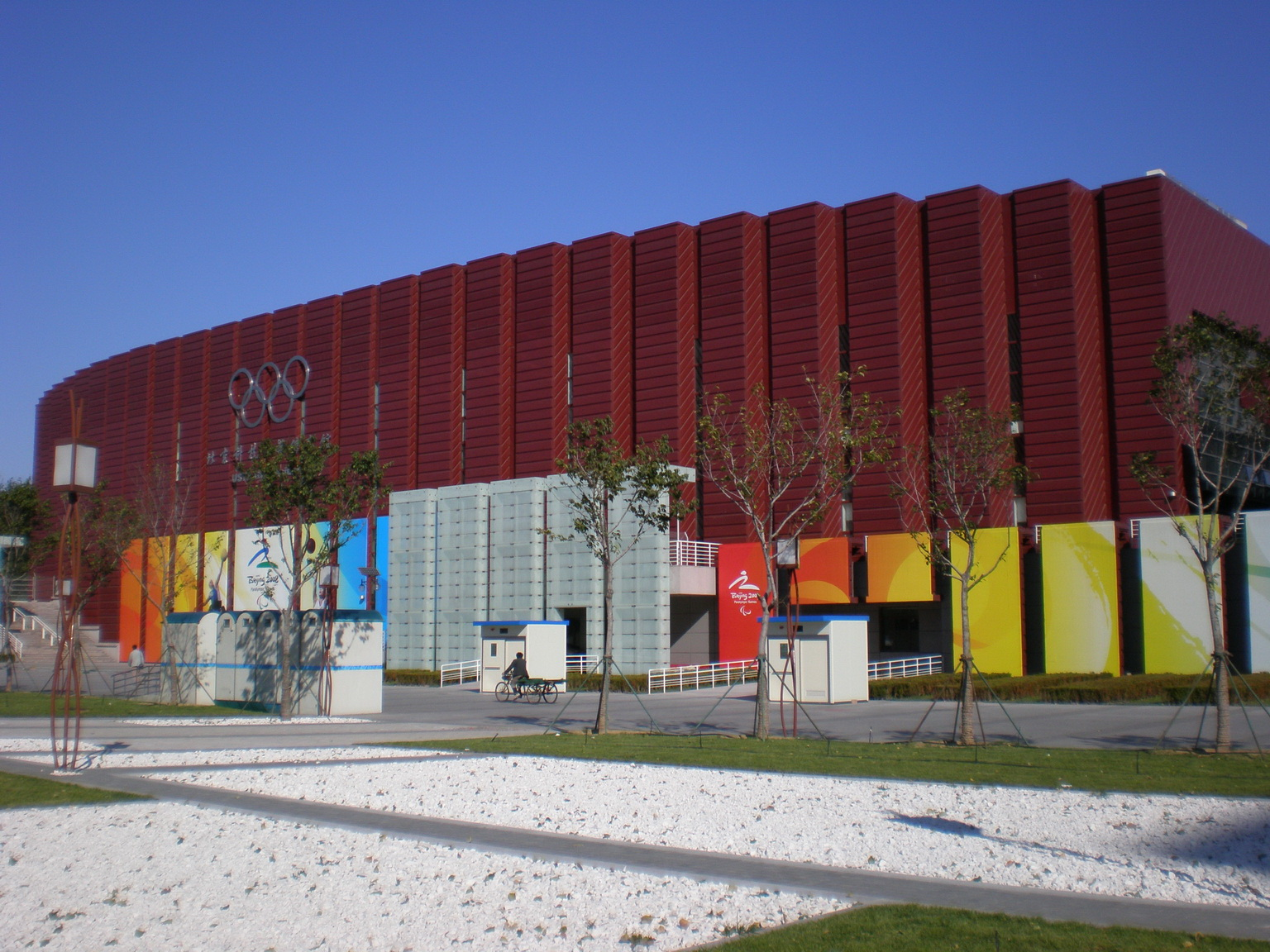
Beijing Science and Technology University Gymnasium hosted the Taekwondo events for the 2008 Summer Olympics.

The Marshall Islands were represented by one male athlete at the 2008 Summer Olympics in taekwondo, Anju Jason. This was Jason's first appearance at the Olympics. Jason was also the first Marshallese athlete to ever qualify for the Olympic Games, and was the only athlete from the Marshall Islands in the 2008 Summer Olympics that was not a wildcard entry. Jason defeated a competitor from Samoa at the qualification tournament in New Caledonia to qualify for the Olympics.

Anju Jason competed in the men's welterweight division, where he was one of six athletes eliminated in tier eleven. The medals in the event went to athletes from Iran, Italy, the United States, and China.

Athlete	Event	Round of 16	Quarterfinals	Semifinals	Repechage	Bronze Medal	Final	
Athlete	Event	Opposition Result	Opposition Result	Opposition Result	Opposition Result	Opposition Result	Opposition Result	Rank
Anju Jason	Men's −80 kg	Cook (GBR); L 0–7	Did not advance					
