= Marshall Islands at the 2024 Summer Olympics =

- IOC code: MHL
- NOC: Marshall Islands National Olympic Committee
- Website: www.oceaniasport.com/marshalls

in Paris, France 26 July 2024 – 11 August 2024
- Competitors: 4 (2 men and 2 women) in 3 sports
- Flag bearers (opening): William Reed & Mattie Sasser
- Flag bearers (closing): Phillip Kinono & Mattie Sasser
- Medals: Gold 0 Silver 0 Bronze 0 Total 0

Summer Olympics appearances (overview)
- 2008; 2012; 2016; 2020; 2024

The Marshall Islands competed at the 2024 Summer Olympics in Paris, France, which were held from 26 July to 11 August 2024. It was the country's fifth appearance at the Summer Olympics since its debut in 2008. The country's delegation contained four athletes: Kayla Hepler and Phillip Kinono in swimming, William Reed in athletics, and Mattie Sasser in weightlifting. Reed and Sasser were the flagbearers for the nation at the opening ceremony, while Kinono and Sasser were the flagbearers at the closing ceremony. The delegation was supported by a collaboration between the Australian Government and the Australian Olympic Committee, which was established for the development of sport in Pacific nations.

Hepler, Kinono, and Reed qualified after receiving universality slots, while Sasser qualified after being the highest ranked athlete from a continent outside of the top 10. Kinono competed first in the men's 50 meter freestyle, but did not progress beyond the heats. Hepler competed the following day in the women's 50 meter freestyle, but also did not progress further. The same day, Reed competed in the men's 100 meters, running a personal best time in the preliminaries but did not advance further. Finally, Sasser competed in the women's 59 kg event and placed tenth, the highest Olympic placement by a Marshallese athlete. Thus, the Marshall Islands has yet to win an Olympic medal.

== Background ==
The games were held from 26 July to 11 August 2024, in the city of Paris, France. This edition of the games marked the Marshall Islands' fifth appearance at the Summer Olympics since its debut at the 2008 Summer Olympics in Beijing, China. No athlete from the Marshall Islands had ever won a medal at the Olympics, the best performance was the eleventh place of weightlifter Mattie Sasser in the women's 58 kg event at the 2016 Summer Olympics in Rio de Janeiro, Brazil.

In the lead-up to the games, the Australian Government announced a collaboration with the Australian Olympic Committee to assist over 230 athletes from 13 Pacific nations (Note: Among the nations that were supported for the games included the Cook Islands, the Federated States of Micronesia, Kiribati, the Marshall Islands, Palau, Papua New Guinea, Samoa, Tonga, Tuvalu, and Vanuatu.) for the 2024 Summer Olympics and 2024 Summer Paralympics, which included the Marshall Islands. The collaboration was made to create opportunities for said nations to compete in international competition, gain access to coaching, and to develop sports diplomacy. On 21 March, Australian Ambassador to the Marshall Islands Paul Wilson invited Marshall Islands National Olympic Committee (MINOC) president Anthony Muller and MINOC secretary general Amy Sasser at the Australian Embassy in the Marshall Islands to recognize Australia's support for the athletes of the nation. The delegation went to a training camp in Divonne-les-Bains with other Pacific athletes for their preparations for the games.

=== Opening and closing ceremonies ===
The Marshall Islands delegation came in 118th out of the 205 National Olympic Committees (NOCs) in the 2024 Summer Olympics Parade of Nations within the opening ceremony. Reed and Sasser held the flag for the delegation. At the closing ceremony, Kinono and Sasser were the flag bearers.

== Competitors ==
List of Marshallese competitors at the 2024 Summer Olympics
Sport	Men	Women	Total
Athletics	1	0	1
Swimming	1	1	2
Weightlifting	0	1	1
Total	2	2	4

== Athletics ==
=== Qualification and lead-up to the games ===
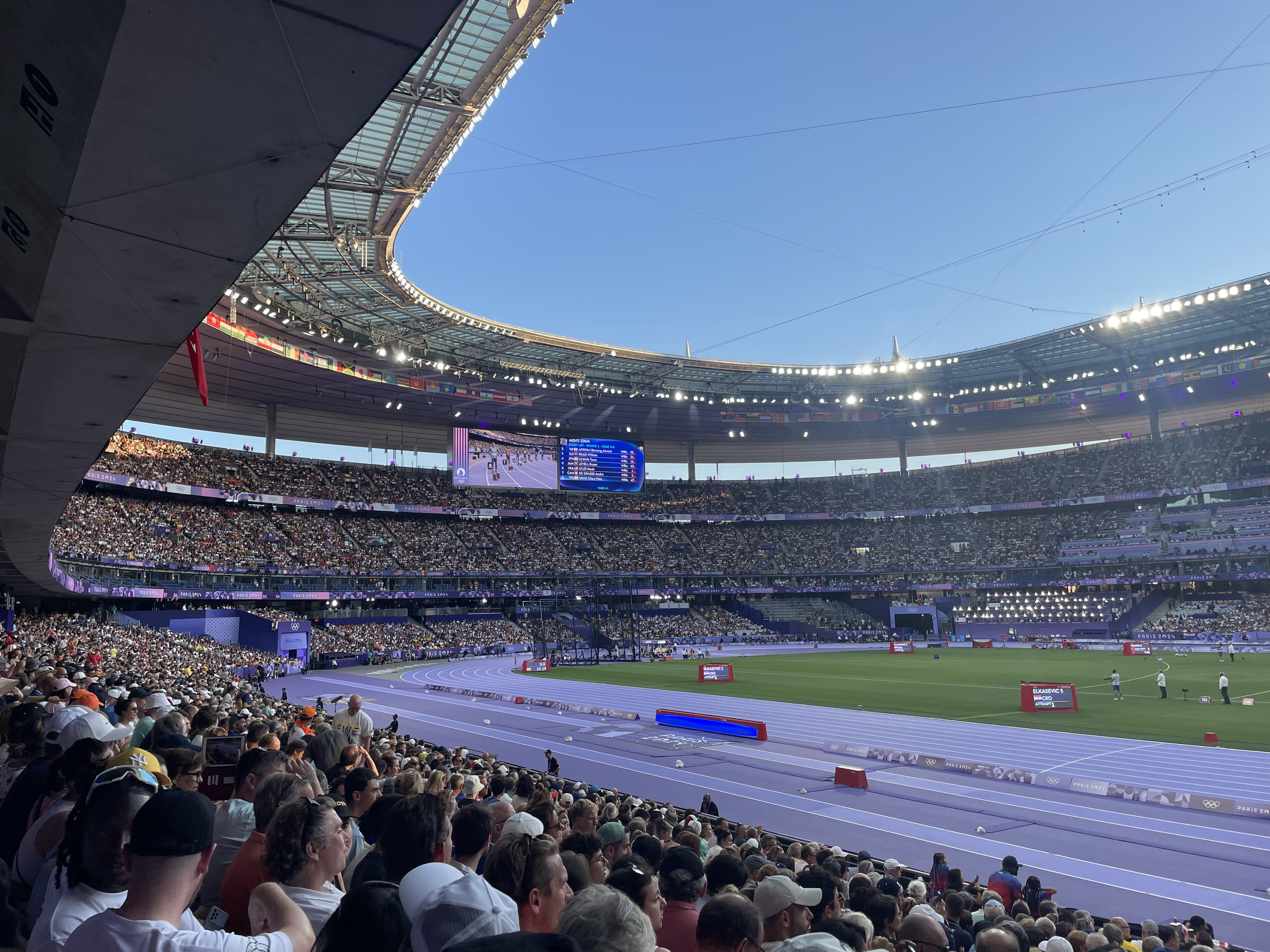
The Stade de France, where Reed competed in his event

The Marshall Islands was eligible for a universality slot to send an athletics competitor to the games, which allows a National Olympic Committee (NOC) to send athletes despite not meeting the standard qualification criteria. The Marshall Islands sent sprinter William Reed, who would compete in the men's 100 meters. The lead-up to the games saw Reed compete at the 2023 Oceania Athletics Cup in Saipan, Northern Mariana Islands, and 2024 Micronesian Games in Majuro, Marshall Islands. He set the national record in the high jump at the former with 1.90 meters. He was coached by his father, Geary Reed.

=== Event ===
Making his Olympic debut, Reed competed in his event on 2 August 2024 at 10:35 a.m., which was held at the Stade de France. He raced in the first heat of the preliminary round against seven other competitors. He finished with a time of 11.29 seconds, placed sixth in the heat, and did not progress further. Despite not progressing, he set a new personal best and a national under-20 record in the event. Noah Lyles of the United States eventually won the gold in a time of 9.784 seconds.

Athletics summary
Athlete	Event	Preliminary		Heat		Semifinal		Final	
Athlete	Event	Result	Rank	Result	Rank	Result	Rank	Result	Rank
William Reed	Men's 100 m	11.29 PB	6	Did not advance					

- Note: Ranks given for track events are within the athlete's heat only

== Swimming ==
=== Qualification and lead-up to the games ===
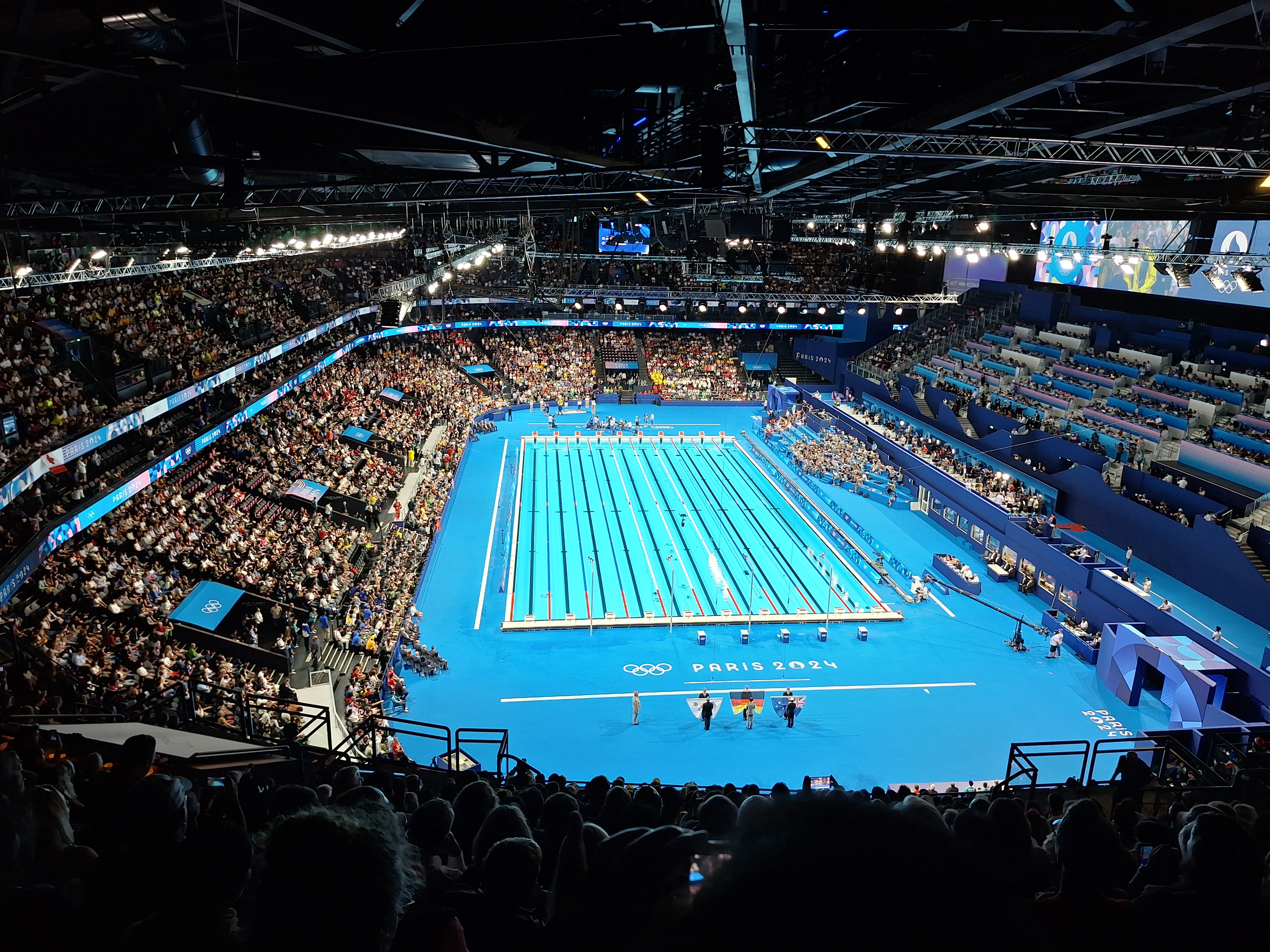
The Paris La Défense Arena, where Hepler and Kinono competed in their events

The Marshall Islands were eligible for universality slots to send swimmers to the games. The nation selected Kayla Hepler and Phillip Kinono, who would compete in the women's 50 meter freestyle and men's 50 meter freestyle respectively. Kinono also competed at the 2020 Summer Olympics in the same event, where he placed 70th, while Hepler's sister, Ann-Marie Hepler, competed at the 2012 Summer Olympics in the same event as hers, placing 49th. Kinono initially trained in a saltwater pool located in the nation before moving to the United States five years before the games for his training and for his studies at Iowa Lakes Community College. Hepler trained in Florida for a month before the games, where she was coached by her mother, Amy LaCost, the chef de mission of the Marshall Islands at the 2020 Summer Olympics.

=== Event ===
Kinono first competed in his event on 1 August 2024 at 11:21 p.m., which was held in the Paris La Défense Arena. He competed in the second of the heats and swam a new personal best time of 27.43 seconds. He placed first out of the seven swimmers in his heat, though finished with a time not fast enough to progress to later rounds, and placed 64th overall. The eventual winner of the event was Cameron McEvoy of Australia with a time of 21.25 seconds. After he competed in his event, he expressed his thanks for representing the nation at the games.

Hepler competed in her event on 3 August 2024 at 11:03 a.m., making her Olympic debut. She competed in the second of the heats and swam a personal best time of 30.33 seconds. She placed second out of the eight swimmers in her heat, finished with a time not enough to progress to later rounds, and placed 62nd overall. The eventual winner of the event was Sarah Sjöström of Sweden with a time of 23.71 seconds. After Hepler competed in her event, she praised the people and athletes she met during her stint at the games.

Swimming summary
Athlete	Event	Heat		Semifinal		Final	
Athlete	Event	Time	Rank	Time	Rank	Time	Rank
Phillip Kinono	Men's 50 m freestyle	27.43 PB	64 (Note: Qualifiers for the latter rounds (Q) of all events were decided on a time only basis, therefore positions shown are overall results versus competitors in all heats.)	Did not advance			
Kayla Hepler	Women's 50 m freestyle	30.33 PB	62	Did not advance			

== Weightlifting ==
=== Qualification and lead-up to the games ===
The Marshall Islands sent one weightlifter to the games based on the International Weightlifting Federation's Qualification Ranking. Mattie Sasser qualified after being the highest ranked athlete from a continent outside of the top 10 ranked athletes in her category, beating Kiana Elliot of Australia with a total of 216 kilograms. Sasser was ranked 12th overall. The lead-up to the games saw her compete at the 2023 IWF Grand Prix I, the 2023 World Weightlifting Championships, the 2023 Pacific Games, which doubled as the 2023 Oceania Weightlifting Championships, where she won three golds in both competitions, then followed by the 2024 Oceanian Weightlifting Championships, where she won one gold and two silvers, and the 2024 IWF World Cup.

Sasser had also competed for the Marshall Islands at the 2016 Summer Olympics in the women's 58 kg event, where she placed eleventh. As a dual citizen of both the Marshall Islands and the United States, she switched her sporting nationality in international competition and attempted to qualify for the United States team for the 2020 Summer Olympics in Tokyo, Japan. She was injured during qualification, however, and required knee surgery. In 2023, she switched back to the Marshall Islands again to qualify for the 2024 games. She was coached by Casey Knuth and trained in Samoa before the games.

=== Event ===
Sasser competed in her event on 8 August 2024, which was held in the Paris Expo Porte de Versailles. She failed to lift her first and second attempts at the snatch at 94 kilograms, then successfully lifted the same weight on her last attempt. She successfully clean and jerked 110 kilograms for her first attempt, then lifted 115 kilograms for her second, ultimately failing her last attempt at 118 kilograms. She ended with a total of 209 kilograms, placing her tenth out of twelve competitors, the highest Olympic finish by a Marshallese athlete. The winner of the event was Luo Shifang with a total of 241 kilograms. After her event, she commented her desire for more women in her country to pursue weightlifting. She also commented her concerns of the possible removal of weightlifting as an Olympic sport after the 2028 Summer Olympics.

Weightlifting summary
Athlete	Event	Snatch		Clean & jerk		Total	Rank
Athlete	Event	Result	Rank	Result	Rank	Total	Rank
Mattie Sasser	Women's 59 kg	94	12	115	10	209	10
