= List of Wallis and Futuna records in Olympic weightlifting =

The following are the national records in Olympic weightlifting in Wallis and Futuna. Records are maintained in each weight class for the snatch lift, clean and jerk lift, and the total for both lifts by the Fédération Française d'Haltérophilie, Musculation, Force Athlétique et Culturisme (FFHMFAC).

== Current records ==
=== Men ===
Event	Record	Athlete	Date	Meet	Place	Ref
55 kg
Snatch						
Clean and Jerk						
Total						
61 kg
Snatch						
Clean & Jerk						
Total						
67 kg
Snatch						
Clean & Jerk						
Total						
73 kg
Snatch						
Clean and Jerk						
Total						
81 kg
Snatch						
Clean and Jerk						
Total						
89 kg
Snatch	145 kg	Israel Kaikilekofe	22 November 2023	Pacific Games	Honiara, Solomon Islands	
Clean and Jerk						
Total						
96 kg
Snatch	161 kg	Israel Kaikilekofe	13 July 2019	Pacific Games	Apia, Samoa	
Clean and Jerk	192 kg	Israel Kaikilekofe	13 July 2019	Pacific Games	Apia, Samoa	
Total	353 kg	Israel Kaikilekofe	13 July 2019	Pacific Games	Apia, Samoa	
102 kg
Snatch						
Clean and Jerk						
Total						
109 kg
Snatch	151 kg	Tamiano Lemo	24 November 2023	Pacific Games	Honiara, Solomon Islands	
Clean and Jerk	177 kg	Tamiano Lemo	24 November 2023	Pacific Games	Honiara, Solomon Islands	
Total	328 kg	Tamiano Lemo	24 November 2023	Pacific Games	Honiara, Solomon Islands	
+109 kg
Snatch						
Clean and Jerk						
Total						

=== Women ===
Event	Record	Athlete	Date	Meet	Place	Ref
45 kg
Snatch						
Clean and Jerk						
Total						
49 kg
Snatch						
Clean and Jerk						
Total						
55 kg
Snatch						
Clean and Jerk						
Total						
59 kg
Snatch						
Clean & Jerk						
Total						
64 kg
Snatch						
Clean and Jerk						
Total						
71 kg
Snatch						
Clean and Jerk						
Total						
76 kg
Snatch						
Clean and Jerk						
Total						
81 kg
Snatch						
Clean and Jerk						
Total						
87 kg
Snatch						
Clean and Jerk						
Total						
+87 kg
Snatch						
Clean and Jerk						
Total						
