= David Ambler =

David Ambler may refer to:

- David Ambler (athlete) (born 1989), New Zealand sprinter
- David Ambler (rower) (born 1997), British rower
