= List of Pacific Games records in Olympic weightlifting =

Weightlifting records in the Pacific Games and Pacific Mini Games are maintained in each weight class for the snatch lift, clean and jerk lift, and the total for both lifts.

== Current records ==
=== Men ===
Event	Record	Athlete	Nation	Games	Date	Ref
55 kg
Snatch	110 kg	Pacific Games Standard			1 November 2018	
Clean & Jerk	140 kg	Pacific Games Standard			1 November 2018	
Total	250 kg	Pacific Games Standard			1 November 2018	
61 kg
Snatch	130 kg	Pacific Games Standard			1 November 2018	
Clean & Jerk	151 kg	Morea Baru	Papua New Guinea	2022 Saipan	20 June 2022	
Total	270 kg	Pacific Games Standard			1 November 2018	
67 kg
Snatch	130 kg	Pacific Games Standard			1 November 2018	
Clean & Jerk	166 kg	Vaipava Ioane	Samoa	2023 Honiara	21 November 2023	
Total	290 kg	Pacific Games Standard			1 November 2018	
73 kg
Snatch	137 kg	Pacific Games Standard			1 November 2018	
Clean & Jerk	173 kg	Pacific Games Standard			1 November 2018	
Total	310 kg	Pacific Games Standard			1 November 2018	
81 kg
Snatch	145 kg	Pacific Games Standard			1 November 2018	
Clean & Jerk	182 kg	Pacific Games Standard			1 November 2018	
Total	327 kg	Pacific Games Standard			1 November 2018	
89 kg
Snatch	150 kg	Pacific Games Standard			1 November 2018	
Clean & Jerk	190 kg	Pacific Games Standard			1 November 2018	
Total	340 kg	Pacific Games Standard			1 November 2018	
96 kg
Snatch	157 kg	Pacific Games Standard			1 November 2018	
Clean & Jerk	203 kg	Pacific Games Standard			1 November 2018	
Total	360 kg	Pacific Games Standard			1 November 2018	
102 kg
Snatch	165 kg	Don Opeloge	Samoa	2023 Honiara	23 November 2023	
Clean & Jerk	214 kg	Don Opeloge	Samoa	2023 Honiara	23 November 2023	
Total	379 kg	Don Opeloge	Samoa	2023 Honiara	23 November 2023	
109 kg
Snatch	165 kg	Pacific Games Standard			1 November 2018	
Clean & Jerk	210 kg	Pacific Games Standard			1 November 2018	
Total	375 kg	Pacific Games Standard			1 November 2018	
+109 kg
Snatch	182 kg	David Liti	New Zealand	2023 Honiara	24 November 2023	
Clean & Jerk	223 kg	David Liti	New Zealand	2023 Honiara	24 November 2023	
Total	405 kg	David Liti	New Zealand	2023 Honiara	24 November 2023	

=== Women ===
Event	Record	Athlete	Nation	Games	Date	Ref
45 kg
Snatch	65 kg	Pacific Games Standard			1 November 2018	
Clean & Jerk	85 kg	Pacific Games Standard			1 November 2018	
Total	150 kg	Pacific Games Standard			1 November 2018	
49 kg
Snatch	75 kg	Pacific Games Standard			1 November 2018	
Clean & Jerk	96 kg	Dika Toua	Papua New Guinea	2022 Saipan	20 June 2022	
Total	170 kg	Pacific Games Standard			1 November 2018	
55 kg
Snatch	84 kg	Jenly Wini	Solomon Islands	2022 Saipan	20 June 2022	
Clean & Jerk	110 kg	Jenly Wini	Solomon Islands	2022 Saipan	20 June 2022	
Total	194 kg	Jenly Wini	Solomon Islands	2022 Saipan	20 June 2022	
59 kg
Snatch	95 kg	Mathlynn Sasser	Marshall Islands	2023 Honiara	21 November 2023	
Clean & Jerk	115 kg	Mathlynn Sasser	Marshall Islands	2023 Honiara	21 November 2023	
Total	210 kg	Mathlynn Sasser	Marshall Islands	2023 Honiara	21 November 2023	
64 kg
Snatch	90 kg	Pacific Games Standard			1 November 2018	
Clean & Jerk	115 kg	Pacific Games Standard			1 November 2018	
Total	205 kg	Pacific Games Standard			1 November 2018	
71 kg
Snatch	95 kg	Pacific Games Standard			1 November 2018	
Clean & Jerk	120 kg	Pacific Games Standard			1 November 2018	
Total	215 kg	Pacific Games Standard			1 November 2018	
76 kg
Snatch	100 kg	Pacific Games Standard			1 November 2018	
Clean & Jerk	125 kg	Pacific Games Standard			1 November 2018	
Total	225 kg	Pacific Games Standard			1 November 2018	
81 kg
Snatch	115 kg	Eileen Cikamatana	Australia	2023 Honiara	23 November 2023	
Clean & Jerk	145 kg	Eileen Cikamatana	Australia	2023 Honiara	23 November 2023	
Total	260 kg	Eileen Cikamatana	Australia	2023 Honiara	23 November 2023	
87 kg
Snatch	110 kg	Eileen Cikamatana	Australia	2022 Saipan	24 June 2022	
Clean & Jerk	140 kg	Eileen Cikamatana	Australia	2022 Saipan	24 June 2022	
Total	250 kg	Eileen Cikamatana	Australia	2022 Saipan	24 June 2022	
+87 kg
Snatch	110 kg	Pacific Games Standard			1 November 2018	
Clean & Jerk	157 kg	Iuniarra Sipaia	Samoa	2022 Saipan	24 June 2022	
Total	261 kg	Iuniarra Sipaia	Samoa	2022 Saipan	24 June 2022	

== See also ==
- List of world records in Olympic weightlifting
- List of Oceanian records in Olympic weightlifting
