= Anju Jason =

Marshallese taekwondo practitioner

Personal information
- Born: November 21, 1987 (age 38) Marshall Islands
- Height: 1.78 m (5 ft 10 in)
- Weight: 80 kg (180 lb)

Sport
- Sport: Taekwondo
Medal record
Men's taekwondo
Representing Marshall Islands
Oceania Taekwondo Olympic Qualification Tournament
Gold medal – first place	2008 New Caledonia	80 kg

Anju Jason (born November 21, 1987) is a Marshallese taekwondo practitioner who competed in the men's welterweight event at the 2008 Summer Olympics, where he was defeated in the first round. He was also the nation's flag bearer during the closing ceremony.

== Biography ==
Anju Jason was born on November 21, 1987, in the Marshall Islands. At the age of six, his father moved him and his sister to Oʻahu, looking for a better education and quality of life for his children. Jason started learning taekwondo after seeing a flier for an academy at the age of nine. He went on and won multiple local and statewide taekwondo tournaments but did not have the chance to represent the United States internationally as he was not a citizen.

In November 2007, after competing in a tournament in Oklahoma, a member of the Marshallese Olympic Committee reached out to Jason to recruit him for the 2008 Summer Olympics in Beijing, the nation's first appearance at an Olympic Games. At the time, he was considering retirement because there were few other available competitions. He competed in the Oceania Taekwondo Olympic Qualification Tournament held in New Caledonia and defeated a competitor from Samoa, qualifying for the Summer Games as the first eligible Marshallese competitor. He was the only one in the team to have qualified without being a wild card entry. Before the Summer Games, he worked for Panda Express and was paid throughout the duration of his stay at the Summer Games.

At the Summer Games, he competed in the preliminary rounds of the men's welterweight event on August 22 at 11:15 am. He competed against Aaron Cook of Great Britain and lost the event with a score of seven to one. Jason was eventually designated as the flag bearer for the nation during the closing ceremony of the Summer Games. He had stated that he planned to visit the nation after the Summer Games for the first time since 2005.

== See also ==
- Marshall Islands at the 2008 Summer Olympics
