= Haley Nemra =

Marshallese distance runner

Personal information
- Full name: Haley Nicole Nemra
- Nationality: Marshall Islands
- Born: October 4, 1989 (age 36) Marysville, Washington, U.S.
- Height: 1.68 m (5 ft 6 in)
- Weight: 59 kg (130 lb)

Sport
- Sport: Athletics
- Event: 800m
- University team: University of San Francisco

Achievements and titles
- Olympic finals: Beijing 2008 (didn't advance), London 2012 (didn't advance)
- Personal best: 2:14:90
Medal record
Women's athletics
Representing Marshall Islands
Micronesian Games
Gold medal – first place	2010 Koror	800 m
Silver medal – second place	2010 Koror	400 m
Silver medal – second place	2010 Koror	1500 m
Bronze medal – third place	2010 Koror	5000 m
Oceania Championships
Silver medal – second place	2012 Cairns	800 m
Oceania Youth Championships
Bronze medal – third place	2006 Apia	800 m
Bronze medal – third place	2006 Apia	1500 m
- Updated on 6 May 2013

Haley Nicole Nemra (born October 4, 1989) is an American-born Marshallese track athlete from Marysville, Washington. She was the first woman to represent the Marshall Islands at the Olympics.

She represented her country at the 2008 Summer Olympics and the 2012 Summer Olympics in the women's 800 meters where she did not advance to the semifinals but finished with a personal best time of 2:14.90. She was flag-bearer for Marshall Islands during the Opening Ceremony in London. She competed for the University of San Francisco from 2008 to 2011.

== Achievements ==
Year	Competition	Venue	Position	Event	Notes
Representing Marshall Islands
2006	Oceania Youth Championships	Apia, Samoa	3rd	800 m	2:31.08 min
2006	Oceania Youth Championships	Apia, Samoa	3rd	1500 m	5:32.57 min
2010	Micronesian Games	Koror, Palau	2nd	400 m	62.15 s
2010	Micronesian Games	Koror, Palau	1st	800 m	2:27.40 min
2010	Micronesian Games	Koror, Palau	2nd	1500 m	5:22.80 min
2010	Micronesian Games	Koror, Palau	3rd	5000 m	21:32.75 min
2012	Oceania Championships (Regional Division West)	Cairns, Australia	2nd	800 m	2:16.04 min

Olympic Games
Preceded by Waylon Muller	Flagbearer for Marshall Islands; London 2012	Succeeded by Mathlynn Sasser
