= Marshall Islands Basketball Federation =

Sports governing body in the Marshall Islands

Marshall Islands Basketball Federation is the governing body for the sport of basketball in Marshall Islands. The federation supports Basketball for Good in the Marshall Islands, along with FIBA, the Australian Embassy in the Republic of the Marshall Islands, and the Sport and Extracurricular Program. The Federation also supported the renovation of the Marshallese national gymnasium's basketball court.

== History ==
The Federation was formed in September 1999.

== Leadership ==
The President of the federation is Amata Kabua Jr, the Vice-President is Christopher Makiphie, the 2nd Vice-President is Neri Wase, and the Secretary General is Kirsten Maddison. A previous President was Candice Guavis. Maddison is a 3 time previous competitor at the Micronesian Games.

== Affiliations ==
- FIBA
- Marshall Islands National Olympic Committee (MINOC)
