= 2006 Oceania Youth Athletics Championships =

VIII Oceania Youth Athletics Championships
- Dates: December 13–16
- Host city: Apia, Upolu, Samoa
- Venue: Apia Park
- Level: Youth
- Events: 37 (19 boys, 18 girls)
- Participation: 148 (90 boys, 58 girls) athletes from 19 nations

The 2006 Oceania Youth Athletics Championships were held at the Apia Park in Apia, Samoa, between December 13–16, 2006. They were held together with the 2006 Oceania Open Championships. A total of 37 events were contested, 19 by boys and 18 by girls.

== Medal summary ==
Complete results can be found on the webpages of the Oceania Athletics Association, of Athletics PNG, of Athletics Samoa. and of the World Junior Athletics History.

=== Boys under 18 (Youth) ===
Event	Gold		Silver		Bronze	
100 metres (wind: 0.9 m/s)	David Ambler (NZL)	11.02	Michael Gordon (AUS)	11.16	Taupo Sefo (SAM)	11.30
200 metres (wind: -0.9 m/s)	Andrew Underwood (NZL)	22.01	Ethan Stewart (NZL)	22.60	David Ambler (NZL)	22.66
400 metres	Andrew Underwood (NZL)	48.60	Joshua Ahwong (AUS)	49.51	Simon Thieury (PYF)	50.06
800 metres	Joshua Ahwong (AUS)	1:57.24	Douglas Bale (SOL)	2:01.38	Justin Monier (PYF)	2:02.94
1500 metres	Iulio Lafai (SAM)	4:34.24	Justin Monier (PYF)	4:35.74	David Townsel (GUM)	4:36.70
3000 metres	Dominic Channon (NZL)	9:43.38	Iulio Lafai (SAM)	9:48.44	Sisa Macdonald (SOL)	9:59.04
110 metres hurdles (wind: 0.9 m/s)	Shay Taylor (NZL)	15.04	Vincent Siululu (SAM)	15.29	Jamie Keehn (AUS)	15.35
400 metres hurdles	Daniel O'Shea (NZL)	54.47	Simon Thieury (PYF)	54.71	Taupo Sefo (SAM)	55.28
High jump	Josh Hall (AUS)	2.03	David Thompson (NZL)	1.94	Ogun Robert (NCL)	1.94
Long jump	Michael Gordon (AUS)	7.13	David Thompson (NZL)	6.82	Ogun Robert (NCL)	6.70
Triple jump	Eugene Vollmer (FIJ)	13.68	David Thompson (NZL)	13.59	Vincent Siululu (SAM)	13.29
Shot put	James Doyle (NZL)	15.62	Loic Tuaira (PYF)	14.81	Henry Satupai (SAM)	13.98
Discus throw	Rooarii Pito (PYF)	49.09	Jacob Croot (NZL)	48.33	Mikaele Manuele (SAM)	44.21
Hammer throw	Tom McGuire (AUS)	52.14	Rooarii Pito (PYF)	47.73	Alexis Valdenaire (PYF)	46.59
Javelin throw	Jamie Keehn (AUS)	64.33	David Thompson (NZL)	56.86	Dougwin Franz (PLW)	50.55
Octathlon	Jamie McLean (NZL)	4916	Leon Mengloi (PLW)	4386	Penisimani Moimoi (TGA)	4208
3.0km Cross Country	David Townsel (GUM)	14:40	Nathaniel Mateo (NMI)	14:57	Victorino Untalan (NMI)	16:06
4 x 100 metres relay	New Zealand; Ethan Stewart; Andrew Underwood; Daniel O'Shea; David Ambler	44.0	Australia; James Buckby; Joshua Ahwong; Scott Campbell; Michael Gordon	45.0	Tonga; Kaneti Felela; Viliami Niupalau; Esau Vakameilalo; Penisimani Moimoi	47.0

=== Girls under 18 (Youth) ===
Event	Gold		Silver		Bronze	
100 metres (wind: 3.3 m/s)	Jennifer Tagney (AUS)	12.18 w	Annabelle Coates (NZL)	12.43 w	Bessie Hayes (AUS)	12.46 w
200 metres (wind: -0.9 m/s)	Jennifer Tagney (AUS)	25.65	Salote Niulevu (FIJ)	26.37	Sopolema Tuitama (SAM)	27.00
400 metres	Sophie Healey (NZL)	57.34	Jane Merry (AUS)	58.55	Laura Komaitai (FIJ)	60.33
800 metres	Rebecca Jenner (AUS)	2:21.07	Jane Merry (AUS)	2:23.37	Haley Nemra (MHL)	2:31.08
1500 metres	Camille Buscomb (NZL)	4:45.88	Eka Faitala (SAM)	5:27.72	Haley Nemra (MHL)	5:32.57
3000 metres	Camille Buscomb (NZL)	10:01.32	Hayley Green (NZL)	10:15.18	Banrenga Baikia (KIR)	14:09.92
100 metres hurdles (wind: -0.1 m/s)	Tracey Hale (NZL)	14.83	Penateti Feke (TGA)	15.56	Vasi Feke (TGA)	15.80
400 metres hurdles	Sela Va'enuku (TGA)	71.38				
High jump	Sarah Saddleton (NZL)	1.75	Johanna Sui (PYF)	1.51	Lu'isa Taufatofua (TGA); Kalina Mama'o (TGA)	1.48
Long jump	Annabelle Coates (NZL)	5.65	Sarah Saddleton (NZL)	5.26	Johanna Sui (PYF)	5.20
Triple jump	Phoebe Lester (NZL)	11.38	Sopolema Tuitama (SAM)	11.13	Lucinda May (NZL)	11.03
Shot put	Margaret Satupai (SAM)	13.67	Vanessa Hurley (NZL)	12.89	Te Rina Keenan (NZL)	12.24
Discus throw	Te Rina Keenan (NZL)	44.46	Dorothy Kiria (COK)	27.26	Judy Tuara (COK)	26.23
Hammer throw	Millie McNie (NZL)	41.16	Lucinda May (NZL)	37.22	Suzy Vercoe (NFK)	34.79
Javelin throw	Shakira Winmar (AUS)	40.83	Stephanie Wrathall (NZL)	40.65	Judy Tuara (COK)	39.83
Heptathlon	Lucinda May (NZL)	4194				
3.0km Cross Country	Jacquelin Wonenberg (NMI)	18:57	Cherith Fisher (MHL)	23:24		
4 x 100 metres relay	Australia; Sarah Busby; Sarah Mackaway; Jane Merry; Jennifer Tagney	49.2	New Zealand; Tracey Hale; Annabelle Coates; Caroline Podmore; Sophie Healey	50.8	Tonga; Vasi Feke; Sela Va'enuku; Kalina Mama'o; Penateti Feke	52.8

=== Mixed ===
Event	Gold		Silver		Bronze	
800 metres Medley relay (100m x 100m x 200m x 400m)	Australia; Bessie Hayes; Michael Gordon; Jennifer Tagney; Joshua Ahwong	1:37.26	Tonga; Sela Va'enuku; Viliami Niupalau; Penateti Feke; Kaneti Felela	1:42.87	Samoa	1:44.38

== Medal table (unofficial) ==
* Host nation (Samoa)

Rank	Nation	Gold	Silver	Bronze	Total
1	New Zealand (NZL)	19	13	3	35
2	Australia (AUS)	11	5	2	18
3	Samoa (SAM)*	2	4	7	13
4	French Polynesia (PYF)	1	5	4	10
5	Tonga (TON)	1	2	6	9
6	Fiji (FIJ)	1	1	1	3
6	Northern Mariana Islands (NMI)	1	1	1	3
8	Guam (GUM)	1	0	1	2
9	Cook Islands (COK)	0	1	2	3
9	Marshall Islands (MHL)	0	1	2	3
11	Palau (PLW)	0	1	1	2
11	Solomon Islands (SOL)	0	1	1	2
13	New Caledonia (NCL)	0	0	2	2
14	Kiribati (KIR)	0	0	1	1
14	Norfolk Island (NFK)	0	0	1	1
Totals (15 entries)		37	35	35	107

== Participation (unofficial) ==
An unofficial count yields the number of about 148 athletes from 19 countries:

- American Samoa (5)
- Australia (20)
- Cook Islands (4)
- Fiji (5)
- French Polynesia (7)
- Guam (3)
- Kiribati (5)
- Marshall Islands (3)
- Federated States of Micronesia (1)
- Nauru (6)
- New Caledonia (3)
- New Zealand (24)
- Norfolk Island (2)
- Northern Mariana Islands (7)
- Palau (5)
- Papua New Guinea (4)
- Samoa (24)
- Solomon Islands (7)
- Tonga (13)
