= Marshall Islands at the 2020 Summer Olympics =

- Flag of the Marshall Islands
- IOC code: MHL
- NOC: Marshall Islands National Olympic Committee
- Website: www.oceaniasport.com/marshalls

in Tokyo 23 July 2021 – 8 August 2021
- Competitors: 2 in 1 sport
- Flag bearers (opening): Colleen Furgeson; Phillip Kinono
- Flag bearer (closing): N/A
- Medals: Gold 0 Silver 0 Bronze 0 Total 0

Summer Olympics appearances (overview)
- 2008; 2012; 2016; 2020; 2024

The Marshall Islands competed at the 2020 Summer Olympics in Tokyo. Originally scheduled to take place from 24 July to 9 August 2020, the Games were postponed to 23 July to 8 August 2021, due to the COVID-19 pandemic. It was the nation's fourth appearance at the Summer Olympics since its debut in 2008. The delegation consisted of two athletes, one man and one woman, competing in two events in swimming. Swimmer Phillip Kinono competed in the men's 50 metre freestyle. Colleen Furgeson, a returning competitor from the 2016 Rio Olympics competed in the women's 100 metre freestyle. For the first time, in an effort to promote gender equality, two flagbearers, one male and one female were allowed at the Olympics. Furgeson and Kinono lead the Marshall Islands squad as the flagbearers in the opening ceremony. The Marshall Islands, however, has yet to win its first ever Olympic medal.

== History ==
The Marshall Islands are a Micronesian island nation, located in the western Pacific Ocean midway between Hawaii and Australia. As of 2021 the island had a population of approximately 42,418. The island nation was controlled by the United States, and prior to that by Japan and Germany at different times in its history, until gaining its sovereignty. In 1979, the Government of the Marshall Islands was officially established and the country became self-governing. In 1986 the Compact of Free Association with the United States entered into force, granting the Republic of the Marshall Islands (RMI) its sovereignty. The island nation is made up of twenty-nine atolls and five single islands.

The Marshall Islands National Olympic Committee gained International Olympic Committee recognition in 2006 during the IOC's meeting on 9 February 2006. The admittance of the Marshall Islands, along with Montenegro (who participated as Serbia and Montenegro at the 2004 Summer Olympics) and Tuvalu the following year, brought the total number of nations competing in the 2008 Olympics to 205. The 2020 Summer Olympics were originally due to be held from 24 July to 9 August 2020, but were delayed to 23 July to 8 August 2021 due to the COVID-19 pandemic. For the 2020 Summer Olympics, the Marshall Islands sent a delegation of two athletes. The team at the 2020 Games featured two swimmers. Swimmer Phillip Kinono was making his Olympic debut at the 2020 Games. He competed in the men's 50 metre freestyle. Colleen Furgeson participating in the women's 100 metre freestyle was making her second consecutive appearance at the Summer Olympics. Both Kinono and Furgeson were the flagbearers for the Marshall Islands in the opening ceremony. No athletes from the Marshall Islands were present for the closing ceremony due to COVID-19 related protocols that required athletes to leave Japan within 48 hours from completion of their final event.

== Swimming ==
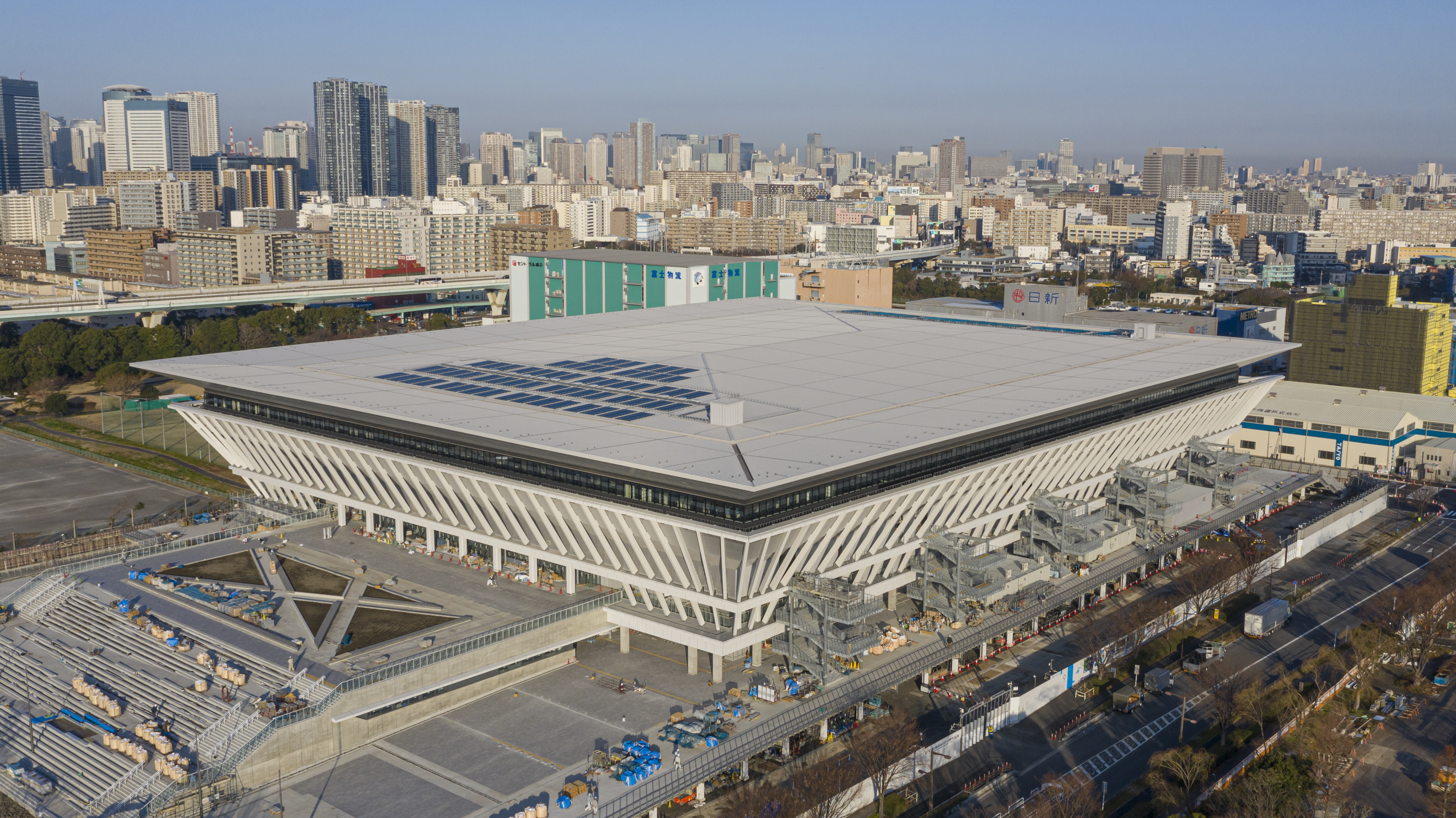
The Tokyo Aquatics Centre, where the aquatic events took place.

The Marshall Islands received a universality invitation from FINA to send two top-ranked swimmers (one per gender) in their respective individual events to the Olympics, based on the FINA Points System of 28 June 2021.

Kinono qualified for the universality slot from FINA as his best time of 29.25 seconds was not within the Olympic Selection Time (OST) of 22.67 seconds. Kinono was drawn in second heat of the men's 50 metre freestyle which was held on 30 July, finishing sixth and last with a time of 27.86 seconds. He finished 70th of all swimmers who competed, and did not advance to the later stages of the 50 metre freestyle.

Colleen Furgeson made her second Olympics appearance at the 2020 Olympics in the women's 100 m freestyle. Like Kinono, Furgeson qualified after receiving a universality place from FINA, her personal best time of 59.10 seconds was outside the "A" and "B" qualification standard. Furgeson took part in heat two of the women's 100 m freestyle, which was held on 28 July, finishing fifth out of eight swimmers that competed, with a time of 58.71 seconds. She finished 44th out of 51 swimmers who competed, (Note: One swimmer, Federica Pellegrini, did not start.) and did not advance to the later stages of the women's 100 m freestyle.

Athlete	Event	Heat		Semifinal		Final	
Athlete	Event	Time	Rank	Time	Rank	Time	Rank
Phillip Kinono	Men's 50 m freestyle	27.86	70	Did not advance			
Colleen Furgeson	Women's 100 m freestyle	58.71	44	Did not advance			

== See also ==
- List of Marshallese records in swimming
- Marshall Islands at the Olympics
