= David Ambler (athlete) =

New Zealand sprinter

Personal information
- Nationality: New Zealand
- Born: 15 September 1989 (age 36)

Sport
- Sport: Athletics
Medal record
Men's athletics
Representing New Zealand
Oceania Youth Championships
Gold medal – first place	2006 Apia	100 m
Gold medal – first place	2006 Apia	4x100 m relay
Bronze medal – third place	2006 Apia	200 m
- Updated on 18 April 2013

David Ambler (born 15 September 1989) is a New Zealand sprinter.

Ambler's personal best time of 10.35 for the 100 metres was the New Zealand junior record until it was broken by Edward Osei-Nketia in 2019. He ranks as the fifth fastest New Zealander over 100 m. He attended Christchurch Boys' High School and Florida State University (2010–2013).

== Personal bests ==
Distance	Time	Place	Date
100 m	10.35	Christchurch, New Zealand	13 March 2009
200 m	21.99	Auckland, New Zealand	30 March 2008

== Achievements ==
Year	Competition	Venue	Position	Event	Notes
Representing New Zealand
2006	Oceania Youth Championships	Apia, Samoa	1st	100 m	11.02 s (wind: +0.9 m/s)
2006	Oceania Youth Championships	Apia, Samoa	3rd	200 m	22.66 s (wind: -0.9 m/s)
2006	Oceania Youth Championships	Apia, Samoa	1st	4 × 100 m relay	44.0
2008	World Junior Championships	Bydgoszcz, Poland	9th (sf)	100m	10.63 (wind: -0.6 m/s)
