= Jared Heine =

American-Marshallese swimmer

Personal information
- Full name: Jared Heine
- National team: Marshall Islands
- Born: 6 September 1984 (age 41) Honolulu, Hawaii, United States
- Height: 1.79 m (5 ft 10 in)
- Weight: 70 kg (154 lb)

Sport
- Sport: Swimming
- Strokes: Backstroke
- Club: Kamehameha Swim Club (U.S.)
- Coach: Kevin Flanagan (U.S.)

Jared J. Heine (born September 6, 1984) is an American-Marshallese swimmer, who specialized in backstroke events. He acquired a dual citizenship to participate internationally for the Marshall Islands at the 2008 Summer Olympics, placing himself among the top 45 swimmers in the 100 m backstroke.

Heine was one of the five athletes to mark an Olympic debut for the Marshall Islands at the 2008 Summer Olympics in Beijing, competing in the men's 100 m backstroke. He cleared a minute barrier to finish the opening heat with a lifetime bodysuit best of 58.86 for a third-place finish and forty-third overall on the evening prelims, failing to advance to the semifinals.

Heine is an information science graduate at the Florida State University in Tallahassee, Florida, and a member and senior coach of Kamehameha Swim Club in his hometown Honolulu.
