= William Reed (sprinter, born 2005) =

Marshallese sprinter (born 2005)

Personal information
- Nationality: Marshall Islands
- Born: 21 July 2005 (age 20)
- Height: 180 cm (5 ft 11 in)

Sport
- Country: Marshall Islands
- Sport: Athletics
- Event: 100 m

Achievements and titles
- Personal best(s): 11.29s (100 m); 23.18s (200 m)

William Reed (born 21 July 2005) is a Marshallese sprinter. He competed for the Marshall Islands in the men's 100 metres at the 2024 Summer Olympics. He placed sixth in the first heat of the preliminaries with a time of 11.29 seconds and did not advance to the next round.
