= Timi Garstang =

Marshallese sprinter

Timi Hilly Garstang (born 21 July 1987 in Orange County, California, United States) is an American-born Marshallese track athlete. He represented his country at the 2012 Summer Olympics in the Men's 100 meters and finished last in the qualifying heats with a time of 12.81 seconds. His time was over a second behind the next placed runner, Patrick Tuara, who had a time of 11.72 seconds.
