= Richson Simeon =

American-Marshallese sprinter (born 1997)

Personal information
- Nationality: Marshall Islands
- Born: 5 October 1997 (age 28) Costa Mesa, California, USA
- Height: 1.55 m (5 ft 1 in)
- Weight: 78 kg (172 lb)

Sport
- Country: Marshall Islands
- Sport: Athletics
- Event: 100 m

Achievements and titles
- Personal best: 100 m: 11.81 (2016)

Richson Simeon (born October 5, 1997) is an American-Marshallese sprinter. He competed in the men's 100 metres at the 2016 Summer Olympics.

Simeon lives in Sacramento, California. The Marshall Islands National Olympic Committee recruited him after watching a video of his high school football highlights; before the NOC contacted him, Simeon had never competed in a sprint. The Olympics were his fifth competitive race; while his time of 11.81 seconds was tied for the slowest in the men's 100 metres, it was a personal best for him.

== International competitions ==
Year	Competition	Venue	Position	Event	Notes
2016	Olympic Games	Rio de Janeiro, Brazil	21st (p)	100 m	11.81
2017	Asian Indoor and Martial Arts Games	Ashgabat, Turkmenistan	35th (h)	60 m	7.81

== Personal Bests ==
Outdoor

Event	Time	Venue	Date
100 m	11.81	Rio de Janeiro, Brazil	13 August 2016
