= Waylon Muller =

Marshallese wrestler (born 1972)

Waylon Muller (born 15 May 1972) is a Marshall Islands wrestler. He was the flag-bearer for the Marshall Islands during the opening ceremony of the 2008 Summer Olympics.
