= Weightlifting at the 2023 Pacific Games =

- Weightlifting pictogram for the Games
- Location: Honiara, Solomon Islands
- Dates: 20–24 November 2023

Weightlifting at the 2023 Pacific Games in Solomon Islands was held on 20–24 November 2023 at the Maranatha Hall in Honiara.

== Competition schedule ==
Schedule
Date	Nov 20	Nov 21	Nov 22	Nov 23	Nov 24
Men's 55kg	F				
Men's 61kg	F				
Men's 67kg		F			
Men's 73kg		F			
Men's 81kg			F		
Men's 89kg			F		
Men's 96kg				F	
Men's 102kg				F	
Men's 109kg					F
Men's 109+kg					F
Women's 45kg	F				
Women's 49kg	F				
Women's 55kg	F				
Women's 59kg		F			
Women's 64kg		F			
Women's 71kg			F		
Women's 76kg			F		
Women's 81kg				F	
Women's 87kg				F	
Women's 87+kg					F

== Medal summary ==
=== Medal table ===
* Host nation (Solomon Islands)

Rank	Nation	Gold	Silver	Bronze	Total
1	Samoa	15	9	0	24
2	Australia	14	13	4	31
3	New Zealand	7	5	9	21
4	Solomon Islands*	5	7	5	17
5	Marshall Islands	5	3	2	10
6	Papua New Guinea	4	5	7	16
7	Fiji	3	2	4	9
8	Guam	3	2	2	7
9	Kiribati	3	0	3	6
10	Northern Mariana Islands	1	1	2	4
11	Nauru	0	5	6	11
12	Tuvalu	0	3	0	3
13	Vanuatu	0	2	1	3
14	Tahiti	0	1	5	6
15	Wallis and Futuna	0	1	3	4
16	Tonga	0	1	0	1
17	New Caledonia	0	0	4	4
18	Palau	0	0	3	3
Totals (18 entries)		60	60	60	180

=== Men's ===
Event	Gold		Silver		Bronze	
55 kg snatch	Raymond Santos (NMI)	96 kg	Mike Riklon (MHL)	96 kg	Philip Masi (SOL)	90 kg
55 kg clean & jerk	Mike Riklon (MHL)	116 kg	Philip Masi (SOL)	113 kg	Raymond Santos (NMI)	112 kg
55 kg total	Mike Riklon (MHL)	212 kg	Raymond Santos (NMI)	208 kg	Philip Masi (SOL)	203 kg
61 kg snatch	Morea Baru (PNG)	123 kg	Ramohaka Brown (SOL)	102 kg	Kaimauri Erati (KIR)	100 kg
61 kg clean & jerk	Ramohaka Brown (SOL)	127 kg	Petterson River (MHL)	126 kg	Kaimauri Erati (KIR)	120 kg
61 kg total	Ramohaka Brown (SOL)	229 kg	Petterson River (MHL)	224 kg	Kaimauri Erati (KIR)	220 kg
67 kg snatch	Vaipava Ioane (SAM)	120 kg	Ditto Iko (NRU)	115 kg	Stan Donga (SOL)	105 kg
67 kg clean & jerk	Vaipava Ioane (SAM)	166 kg OR	Ditto Iko (NRU)	145 kg	Leowell Cristobal (NMI)	137 kg
67 kg total	Vaipava Ioane (SAM)	286 kg	Ditto Iko (NRU)	260 kg	Stan Donga (SOL)	238 kg
73 kg snatch	John Tafi (SAM)	136 kg OR	Manuila Raobu (TUV)	125 kg	Stevick Patris (PLW)	116 kg
73 kg clean & jerk	John Tafi (SAM)	160 kg	Manuila Raobu (TUV)	152 kg	Stevick Patris (PLW)	146 kg
73 kg total	John Tafi (SAM)	296 kg	Manuila Raobu (TUV)	277 kg	Stevick Patris (PLW)	262 kg
81 kg snatch	Ruben Katoatau (KIR)	132 kg	Rory Scott (AUS)	131 kg	Sylvain Duclos (NCL)	120 kg
81 kg clean & jerk	Ruben Katoatau (KIR)	171 kg	Rory Scott (AUS)	170 kg	Sylvain Duclos (NCL)	153 kg
81 kg total	Ruben Katoatau (KIR)	303 kg	Rory Scott (AUS)	301 kg	Sylvain Duclos (NCL)	273 kg
89 kg snatch	Kyle Bruce (AUS)	146 kg	Israel Kaikilekofe (WLF)	145 kg	Oliver Saxton (AUS)	145 kg
89 kg clean & jerk	Kyle Bruce (AUS)	184 kg	Oliver Saxton (AUS)	182 kg	Matahi Tahiaipuoho (TAH)	155 kg
89 kg total	Kyle Bruce (AUS)	330 kg	Oliver Saxton (AUS)	327 kg	Matahi Tahiaipuoho (TAH)	282 kg
96 kg snatch	Maeu Nanai Livi (SAM)	155 kg	Ethan Elwell (GUM)	140 kg	Steven Tehihira (TAH)	136 kg
96 kg clean & jerk	Maeu Nanai Livi (SAM)	185 kg	Uaealesi Funaki (TGA)	166 kg	Uea Detudamo (NRU)	165 kg
96 kg total	Maeu Nanai Livi (SAM)	340 kg	Ethan Elwell (GUM)	305 kg	Uea Detudamo (NRU)	298 kg
102 kg snatch	Don Opeloge (SAM)	165 kg GR	Tahiri Metua (TAH)	116 kg	Timothy Vakuruivalu (FIJ)	115 kg
102 kg clean & jerk	Don Opeloge (SAM)	214 kg GR	Timothy Vakuruivalu (FIJ)	137 kg	Tahiri Metua (TAH)	135 kg
102 kg total	Don Opeloge (SAM)	379 kg GR	Timothy Vakuruivalu (FIJ)	252 kg	Tahiri Metua (TAH)	251 kg
109 kg snatch	Taniela Rainibogi (FIJ)	165 kg	Matthew Lydement (AUS)	152 kg	Tamiano Lemo (WLF)	151 kg
109 kg clean & jerk	Taniela Rainibogi (FIJ)	192 kg	Matthew Lydement (AUS)	181 kg	Tamiano Lemo (WLF)	177 kg
109 kg total	Taniela Rainibogi (FIJ)	357 kg	Matthew Lydement (AUS)	333 kg	Tamiano Lemo (WLF)	328 kg
+109 kg snatch	David Liti (NZL)	182 kg GR	Sanele Mao (SAM)	175 kg	Malaci Faamausili-Fala (NZL)	150 kg
+109 kg clean & jerk	David Liti (NZL)	223 kg GR	Sanele Mao (SAM)	220 kg	Malaci Faamausili-Fala (NZL)	180 kg
+109 kg total	David Liti (NZL)	405 kg GR	Sanele Mao (SAM)	395 kg	Malaci Faamausili-Fala (NZL)	330 kg

=== Women's ===
Event	Gold		Silver		Bronze	
45 kg snatch	Nicola Lagatao (GUM)	59 kg	Dorothy Igo (PNG)	51 kg	Konio Toua (PNG)	50 kg
45 kg clean & jerk	Nicola Lagatao (GUM)	73 kg	Konio Toua (PNG)	66 kg	Dorothy Igo (PNG)	56 kg
45 kg total	Nicola Lagatao (GUM)	132 kg	Konio Toua (PNG)	116 kg	Dorothy Igo (PNG)	107 kg
49 kg snatch	Dika Toua (PNG)	76 kg	Thelma Toua (PNG)	66 kg	Rowena Donga (SOL)	65 kg
49 kg clean & jerk	Dika Toua (PNG)	90 kg	Rowena Donga (SOL)	84 kg	Thelma Toua (PNG)	82 kg
49 kg total	Dika Toua (PNG)	166 kg	Rowena Donga (SOL)	149 kg	Thelma Toua (PNG)	148 kg
55 kg snatch	Jenly Tegu Wini (SOL)	82 kg	Lorah Maelosia (SOL)	76 kg	My-Only Stephen (NRU)	72 kg
55 kg clean & jerk	Jenly Tegu Wini (SOL)	108 kg	Lorah Maelosia (SOL)	94 kg	My-Only Stephen (NRU)	93 kg
55 kg total	Jenly Tegu Wini (SOL)	190 kg	Lorah Maelosia (SOL)	170 kg	My-Only Stephen (NRU)	165 kg
59 kg snatch	Mathlynn Sasser (MHL)	95 kg GR	Kiana Elliott (AUS)	89 kg	Elizabeth Granger (NZL)	76 kg
59 kg clean & jerk	Mathlynn Sasser (MHL)	115 kg GR	Kiana Elliott (AUS)	104 kg	Riana Froger (NZL)	103 kg
59 kg total	Mathlynn Sasser (MHL)	210 kg GR	Kiana Elliott (AUS)	193 kg	Elizabeth Granger (NZL)	178 kg
64 kg snatch	Darcy Kay (AUS)	84 kg	Emma McIntyre (NZL)	83 kg	Jacinta Sumagaysay (GUM)	73 kg
64 kg clean & jerk	Brenna Kean (AUS)	108 kg	Emma McIntyre (NZL)	107 kg	Darcy Kay (AUS)	102 kg
64 kg total	Emma McIntyre (NZL)	190 kg	Darcy Kay (AUS)	186 kg	Jacinta Sumagaysay (GUM)	168 kg
71 kg snatch	Jacqueline Nichele (AUS)	93 kg	Sarah Cochrane (AUS)	90 kg	Maximina Uepa (NRU)	88 kg
71 kg clean & jerk	Jacqueline Nichele (AUS)	119 kg	Maximina Uepa (NRU)	117 kg	Sarah Cochrane (AUS)	107 kg
71 kg total	Jacqueline Nichele (AUS)	212 kg	Maximina Uepa (NRU)	205 kg	Sarah Cochrane (AUS)	197 kg
76 kg snatch	Olivia Shelton (AUS)	96 kg	Avatu Opeloge (SAM)	88 kg	Demy Dabin (NCL)	78 kg
76 kg clean & jerk	Olivia Shelton (AUS)	119 kg	Avatu Opeloge (SAM)	110 kg	Merean Atantaake (MHL)	96 kg
76 kg total	Olivia Shelton (AUS)	215 kg	Avatu Opeloge (SAM)	198 kg	Merean Atantaake (MHL)	169 kg
81 kg snatch	Eileen Cikamatana (AUS)	115 kg GR	Hayley Whiting (NZL)	90 kg	Makare Tavanavanua (FIJ)	77 kg
81 kg clean & jerk	Eileen Cikamatana (AUS)	145 kg GR	Hayley Whiting (NZL)	107 kg	Makare Tavanavanua (FIJ)	95 kg
81 kg total	Eileen Cikamatana (AUS)	260 kg GR	Hayley Whiting (NZL)	197 kg	Makare Tavanavanua (FIJ)	172 kg
87 kg snatch	Renee Baarspul (NZL)	95 kg	Ajah Pritchard-Lolo (VAN)	90 kg	Noi Igo (PNG)	86 kg
87 kg clean & jerk	Renee Baarspul (NZL)	112 kg	Noi Igo (PNG)	109 kg	Ajah Pritchard-Lolo (VAN)	107 kg
87 kg total	Renee Baarspul (NZL)	207 kg	Ajah Pritchard-Lolo (VAN)	197 kg	Noi Igo (PNG)	195 kg
+87 kg snatch	Lesila Fiapule (SAM)	108 kg	Iuniarra Sipaia (SAM)	107 kg	Susana Nimo (NZL)	98 kg
+87 kg clean & jerk	Iuniarra Sipaia (SAM)	145 kg	Lesila Fiapule (SAM)	135 kg	Susana Nimo (NZL)	121 kg
+87 kg total	Iuniarra Sipaia (SAM)	252 kg	Lesila Fiapule (SAM)	243 kg	Susana Nimo (NZL)	219 kg

== See also ==
- Weightlifting at the Pacific Games
