= Giordan Harris =

Marshallese swimmer

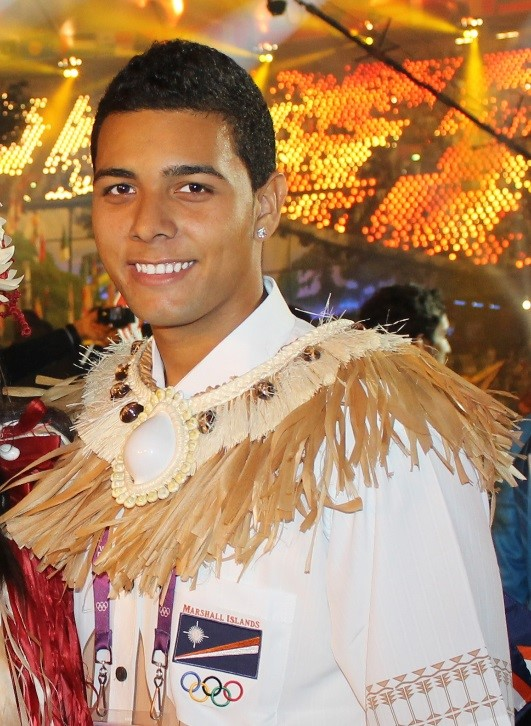

Personal information
- Nationality: Marshall Islands
- Born: April 19, 1993 (age 31); Las Vegas, Nevada, USA
- Height: 1.85 m (6 ft 1 in)
- Weight: 99 kg (218 lb)

Sport
- Country: Marshall Islands
- Sport: Swimming
- Event: 50m Freestyle

Giordan Kariara Harris (born April 19, 1993) is a former competitive swimmer, and current swim coach, from Ebeye Island, Kwajalein Atoll, of the Marshall Islands. Harris is a two-time Olympic swimmer, multiple national record holder, NJCAA All American, and NJCAA & NCAA school record holder. Harris participated in numerous international competitions representing his home country, including the inaugural 2010 Summer Youth Olympics in Singapore, FINA World Long Course Championships, FINA World Short Course Championships, and most notably the 2012 Summer Olympics in London, and the 2016 Summer Olympics in Rio.

Harris was the first athlete from the Marshall Islands to receive the Oceania Australia Foundation Scholarship and the first athlete raised in the islands to receive an athletic scholarship to an NCAA program in the United States.

Harris is the first Oceania Pacific Islander to coach at the NCAA Division II & Division I level.

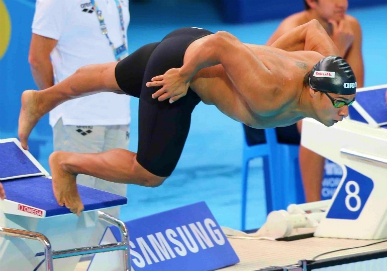

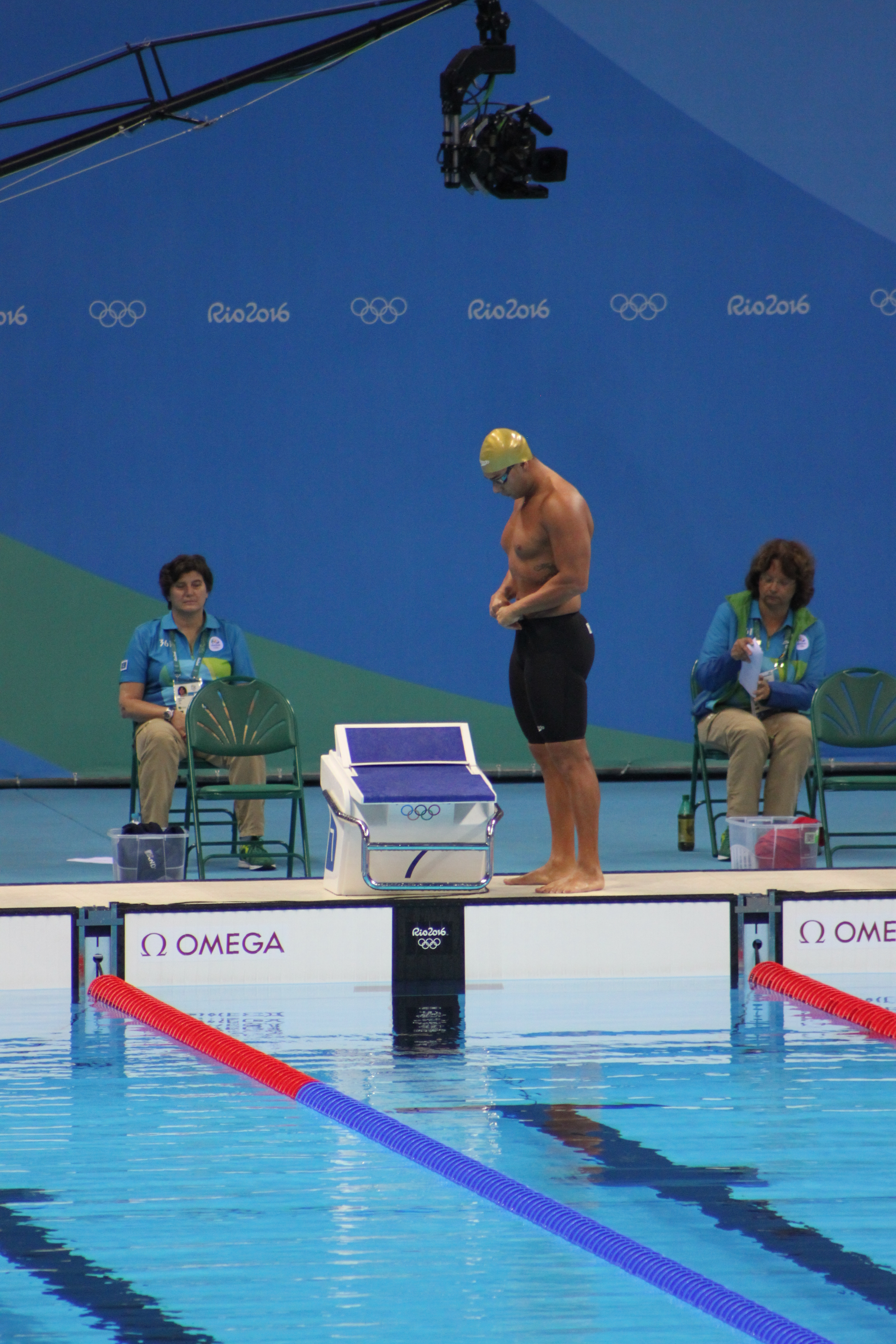

== International career ==
- 2005 South Pacific Games Mini Games, Koror, in Palau, July 25-August 4, 2005, his first international competition at age 12, Harris was the youngest visiting swimmer to compete.
- 2006 6th Micronesian Games, Saipan, in Northern Mariana Islands, June 23-July 2, 2006
- 2007 12th FINA World Aquatics Championships, Rod Laver Arena in Melbourne, Australia, 25 March to 1 April 2007
- 2010 8th Oceania Swimming Championships, Tuanaimato Aquatic Centre in Apia, Samoa, June 21–26, 2010
- 2010 7th Micronesian Games, Koror, Palau, August 1–10, 2010, Silver Medal in Men 400 Meter Free Relay and silver medal in Men 400m Medley Relay
- 2010 Summer Youth Olympics, Singapore, August 14–26, 2010
- 2010 10th FINA World Swimming Championships, Dubai, United Arab Emirates, December 15–19, 2010
- 2011 14th FINA World Aquatics Championships, Shanghai Oriental Sports Center, Shanghai, China, July 16–31, 2011
- 2011 Pacific Games, Nouméa, New Caledonia, August 27 to September 10, 2011
- 2012 9th Oceania Swimming Championships, Nouméa, New Caledonia, May 28-June 3, 2012
- 2012 6th French Open EDF Paris, France, July 6 and 7, 2012
- 2012 Summer Olympics, commonly known as London 2012, London, United Kingdom, 27 July to 12 August 2012 - Harris competed in the 50 m Freestyle event. He finished in 46th place in the heats, he did not advance to the semifinals.
- 2012 11th FINA World Swimming Championships, Istanbul, Turkey on December 12–16, 2012
- 2013 15th FINA World Championships Barcelona, Catalonia, Spain, July 20 to August 4
- 2014 10th Oceania Swimming Championships, Westwave Aquatic Centre in Auckland, New Zealand, May 20–23, 2014
- 2014 8th Micronesian Games, Pohnpei, Federated States of Micronesia July 20 to July 30, 2014 - Harris received four bronze medals and 2 Silver Medals.
- 2015 Pacific Games, Port Moresby, Papua New Guinea, July 4 to 18, 2015
- 2015 16th FINA World Championships, Kazan, Russia, 24 July to 9 August 2015
- 2016 11th Oceania Swimming Championships, Damodar Aquatic Centre in Suva, Fiji, June 21–26, 2016 - Harris qualified for "B Finals" in the 50m Butterfly
- 2016 Summer Olympics, commonly known as Rio 2016, in Rio de Janeiro, Brazil, August 5 to 21, 2016 - Harris competed in the 50 m Freestyle event. He finished in 63rd place in the heats, he did not advance to the semifinals.

== Honors ==
2013 Received the Oceania Australia Foundation Scholarship, to Iowa Lakes College

2014 - 2015 Iowa Lakes Community College (NJCAA) Team Captain

2015 NJCAA All American

== Training ==
Trained with Kwajalein Swim Team until the age of 15.

2010-2012 training location: Spire Institute, Michael Johnson Performance Center, Geneva, Ohio, under Coach: Jim Bocci

2013-2015 training location: Iowa Lakes College, Men's Swimming & Diving, Estherville, Iowa,

2015-2016 training location: The Bolles School - Jacksonville, Florida, under Coach: Jon Sakovich

2016-2018 Maryville University, Maryville University Athletics, St. Louis, MO

== Early life ==
Giordan was raised on Ebeye Island, the most populous island of Kwajalein Atoll in the Marshall Islands, where his mother, Mary Harris, was born. His mom regularly took him to the lagoon as a baby, where he spent countless hours swimming. He started swim team at the age of six and was the first swimmer from Ebeye to be a part of Kwajalein Swim Team on the neighboring US military base which houses the only pool in the Marshall Islands. He traveled to and from practice from Ebeye to Kwajalein, by ferry that took a half hour each way. During training for competitions he would travel back and forth for morning practice and again for evening practice, being on the ferry 4 times in a day.

Giordan is the oldest of three, and has two sisters, Jayana and Jolina. His sister Jolina, is an elite swimmer with Special Olympics with dreams of swimming at the Olympics like her brother. He continues to coach her on his visits home.
