= Mattie Sasser =

Marshallese-born American weightlifter

Personal information
- Full name: Mathlynn Langtor Sasser-Robert
- Nationality: Marshall Islands; United States
- Born: December 25, 1996 (age 29) Mili, Marshall Islands
- Weight: 57.54 kg (126.9 lb)

Sport
- Sport: Weightlifting
- Event: –64 kg
- Coached by: David Ester
Medal record
Women's weightlifting
Representing the Marshall Islands
Pacific Games
Bronze medal – third place	2015 Port Moresby	58 kg
Oceania Championships
Gold medal – first place	2016 Suva	58 kg
Gold medal – first place	2017 Gold Coast	63 kg
Gold medal – first place	2023 Honiara	59 kg
Silver medal – second place	2024 Auckland	59 kg
Bronze medal – third place	2015 Port Moresby	58 kg
Pacific Mini Games
Gold medal – first place	2017 Port Vila	63 kg
Silver medal – second place	2013 Mata Utu	58 kg
Asian Indoor and Martial Arts Games
Silver medal – second place	2017 Ashgabat	63 kg
Representing the United States
Pan American Games
Silver medal – second place	2019 Lima	64 kg
Pan American Championships
Bronze medal – third place	2019 Guatemala City	64 kg

Mathlynn Langtor Sasser-Robert (born December 25, 1996) is a Marshallese-born American weightlifter who currently represents the Marshall Islands.

== Career ==
Sasser competed at the 2016 Summer Olympics in the women's 58 kg event, in which she placed eleventh. She was the flag bearer for the Marshall Islands at the 2016 Parade of Nations. As a dual citizen of both the Marshall Islands and the United States, she switched her sporting nationality in international competition and attempted to qualify for the United States team for the 2020 Summer Olympics in Tokyo, Japan. She was injured during qualification, however, and required knee surgery. In 2023, she switched back to the Marshall Islands again to qualify for the 2024 games. She was coached by Casey Knuth and trained in Samoa before the games.

Sasser went on to represent the Marshall Islands at the 2024 Summer Olympics. She competed in her event on August 8, 2024, which was held in the Paris Expo Porte de Versailles. She failed to lift her first and second attempts at the snatch at 94 kilograms, then successfully lifted the same weight on her last attempt. She successfully clean and jerked 110 kilograms for her first attempt, then lifted 115 kilograms for her second, ultimately failing her last attempt at 118 kilograms. She ended with a total of 209 kilograms, placing her tenth out of twelve competitors, the highest Olympic finish by a Marshallese athlete. The winner of the event was Luo Shifang with a total of 241 kilograms. After her event, she commented her desire for more women in her country to pursue weightlifting. She also commented her concerns of the possible removal of weightlifting as an Olympic sport after the 2028 Summer Olympics.

== Major results ==
Year	Venue	Weight	Snatch (kg)				Clean & Jerk (kg)				Total	Rank
Year	Venue	Weight	1	2	3	Rank	1	2	3	Rank	Total	Rank
Olympic Games
2016	Rio de Janeiro, Brazil	58 kg	82	84	87	—N/a	110	~~112~~	112	—N/a	199	11
2024	Paris, France	59 kg	~~94~~	~~94~~	94	—N/a	110	115	~~118~~	—N/a	209	10
World Championships
2015	Houston, United States	58 kg	77	80	~~82~~	32	100	103	~~106~~	26	183	29
2018	Ashgabat, Turkmenistan	64 kg	94	97	~~100~~	12	~~120~~	121	~~125~~	13	218	13
2019	Pattaya, Thailand	64 kg	96	100	~~103~~	9	~~125~~	~~126~~	~~127~~	—	—	—
2023	Riyadh, Saudi Arabia	59 kg	90	~~94~~	94	20	112	~~116~~	116	21	210	20
Oceania Championships
2012	Apia, Samoa	58 kg	~~50~~	~~105~~	50	7	65	70	71	6	121	7
2013	Brisbane, Australia	58 kg	63	67	~~70~~	4	80	~~85~~	~~85~~	4	147	4
2015	Port Moresby, Papua New Guinea	58 kg	72	~~75~~	75	3rd place, bronze medalist(s)	95	~~97~~	97	3rd place, bronze medalist(s)	172	3rd place, bronze medalist(s)
2016	Suva, Fiji	58 kg	82	85	~~88~~	2nd place, silver medalist(s)	108	113	114	1st place, gold medalist(s)	199	1st place, gold medalist(s)
2017	Gold Coast, Australia	63 kg	86	90	~~92~~	1st place, gold medalist(s)	113	115	~~118~~	1st place, gold medalist(s)	205	1st place, gold medalist(s)
2023	Honiara, Solomon Islands	59 kg	90	95	~~97~~	1st place, gold medalist(s)	110	115	—	1st place, gold medalist(s)	210	1st place, gold medalist(s)
2024	Auckland, New Zealand	59 kg	92	96	98	1st place, gold medalist(s)	~~112~~	~~112~~	112	2nd place, silver medalist(s)	210	2nd place, silver medalist(s)
Pan American Games
2019	Lima, Peru	64 kg	96	100	102	—N/a	125	128	130	—N/a	232	2nd place, silver medalist(s)
Pan American Championships
2018	Santo Domingo, Dominican Republic	63 kg	91	95	~~98~~	7	115	120	~~124~~	7	215	7
2019	Guatemala City, Guatemala	64 kg	95	98	~~101~~	5	123	127	129	1st place, gold medalist(s)	227	3rd place, bronze medalist(s)
2021	Guayaquil, Ecuador	64 kg	~~97~~	98	~~101~~	5	120	125	~~128~~	3rd place, bronze medalist(s)	223	5
