= List of Finnish records in Olympic weightlifting =

The following are the national records in Olympic weightlifting in Finland. Records are maintained in each weight class for the snatch lift, clean and jerk lift, and the total for both lifts by the Finnish Weightlifting Federation (Suomen Painonnostoliitto).

== Current records ==
=== Men ===
Event	Record	Athlete	Date	Meet	Place	Ref
60 kg
Snatch	101 kg	Kai Ollonen	27 February 2026	Finnish Championships	Tampere, Finland	
Clean & Jerk	123 kg	Kai Ollonen	27 February 2026	Finnish Championships	Tampere, Finland	
Total	224 kg	Kai Ollonen	27 February 2026	Finnish Championships	Tampere, Finland	
65 kg
Snatch	106 kg	Standard				
Clean & Jerk	131 kg	Standard				
Total	231 kg	Standard				
70 kg
Snatch	121 kg	Standard				
Clean & Jerk	143 kg	Standard				
Total	258 kg	Standard				
75 kg
Snatch	130 kg	Standard				
Clean & Jerk	156 kg	Standard				
Total	286 kg	Standard				
85 kg
Snatch	141 kg	Eetu Hautaniemi	17 October 2026	European U23 Championships	Durrës, Albania	
Clean & Jerk	171 kg	Standard				
Total	311 kg	Eetu Hautaniemi	17 October 2026	European U23 Championships	Durrës, Albania	
95 kg
Snatch	150 kg	Konsta Suoniemi	12 September 2026		Rovaniemi, Finland	
Clean & Jerk	181 kg	Konsta Suoniemi	18 October 2026	European U23 Championships	Durrës, Albania	
Total	330 kg	Konsta Suoniemi	18 October 2026	European U23 Championships	Durrës, Albania	
110 kg
Snatch	150 kg	Jesse Nykänen	31 October 2026		Kauhajoki, Finland	
Clean & Jerk	193 kg	Standard				
Total	341 kg	Standard				
+110 kg
Snatch	170 kg	Hanno Keskitalo	25 April 2026	European Championships	Batumi, Georgia	
Clean & Jerk	194 kg	Rebin Rezazadeh	24 July 2026		Kotka, Finland	
Total	361 kg	Hanno Keskitalo	25 April 2026	European Championships	Batumi, Georgia	

=== Women ===
Event	Record	Athlete	Date	Meet	Place	Ref
49 kg
Snatch	71 kg	Sonja Koponen	22 August 2026		Turku, Finland	
Clean & Jerk	90 kg	Standard				
Total	160 kg	Standard				
53 kg
Snatch	76 kg	Standard				
Clean & Jerk	93 kg	Standard				
Total	164 kg	Standard				
57 kg
Snatch	91 kg	Standard				
Clean & Jerk	112 kg	Standard				
Total	200 kg	Standard				
61 kg
Snatch	90 kg	Standard				
Clean & Jerk	114 kg	Standard				
Total	200 kg	Standard				
69 kg
Snatch	99 kg	Standard				
Clean & Jerk	120 kg	Inka Tiainen	28 February 2026	Finnish Championships	Tampere, Finland	
Total	217 kg	Standard				
77 kg
Snatch	113 kg	Janette Ylisoini	23 April 2026	European Championships	Batumi, Georgia	
Clean & Jerk	135 kg	Janette Ylisoini	2 November 2025	European Junior Championships	Durrës, Albania	
Total	247 kg	Janette Ylisoini	23 April 2026	European Championships	Batumi, Georgia	
86 kg
Snatch	114 kg	Janette Ylisoini	25 September 2026	Blue Swords Cup	Meissen, Germany	
Clean & Jerk	135 kg	Minni Hormavirta	18 October 2026	European Junior Championships	Durrës, Albania	
Total	247 kg	Janette Ylisoini	25 September 2026	Blue Swords Cup	Meissen, Germany	
+86 kg
Snatch	95 kg	Standard				
Clean & Jerk	115 kg	Laura Peippo	25 September 2026	World Masters Championships	Athens, Greece	
Total	209 kg	Standard				

== Historical records ==
=== Men (2025–2026) ===
Event	Record	Athlete	Date	Meet	Place	Ref
71 kg
Snatch	123 kg	Panagiotis Topali	20 December 2025		Helsinki, Finland	
Clean & Jerk	144 kg	Standard				
Total	260 kg	Standard				
79 kg
Snatch	134 kg	Panagiotis Topali	6 June 2026		Helsinki, Finland	
Clean & Jerk	160 kg	Timo Heikuksela	6 October 2025	World Championships	Førde, Norway	
Total	293 kg	Timo Heikuksela	6 October 2025	World Championships	Førde, Norway	
88 kg
Snatch	141 kg	Standard				
Clean & Jerk	173 kg	Eetu Hautaniemi	6 July 2025			
Total	313 kg	Eetu Hautaniemi	6 July 2025			
94 kg
Snatch	150 kg	Konsta Suoniemi	24 January 2026		Rovaniemi, Finland	
Clean & Jerk	179 kg	Antti Peltokangas	20 December 2025		Lempäälä, Finland	
Total	325 kg	Konsta Suoniemi	24 January 2026		Rovaniemi, Finland	

=== Men (2018–2025) ===
Event	Record	Athlete	Date	Meet	Place	Ref
55 kg
Snatch	83 kg	Kai Ollonen	10 November 2023		Rovaniemi, Finland	
Clean & Jerk	105 kg	Kai Ollonen	10 November 2023		Rovaniemi, Finland	
Total	188 kg	Kai Ollonen	10 November 2023		Rovaniemi, Finland	
61 kg
Snatch	101 kg	Standard				
Clean & Jerk	125 kg	Kai Ollonen	26 April 2025		Rovaniemi, Finland	
Total	225 kg	Standard				
67 kg
Snatch	113 kg	Henri Kaikkonen	13 November 2021	Nordic Championships	Copenhagen, Denmark	
Clean & Jerk	140 kg	Henri Kaikkonen	18 June 2021		Kouvola, Finland	
Total	248 kg	Henri Kaikkonen	18 June 2021		Kouvola, Finland	
73 kg
Snatch	130 kg	Panagiotis Topali	21 February 2025		Kokkola, Finland	
Clean & Jerk	153 kg	Standard				
Total	277 kg	Panagiotis Topali	21 February 2025		Kokkola, Finland	
81 kg
Snatch	136 kg	Timo Heikuksela	16 November 2024		Kouvola, Finland	
Clean & Jerk	168 kg	Timo Heikuksela	17 May 2025		Helsinki, Finland	
Total	301 kg	Timo Heikuksela	16 November 2024		Kouvola, Finland	
89 kg
Snatch	148 kg	Eero Retulainen	29 January 2020	World Cup	Rome, Italy	
Clean & Jerk	187 kg	Eero Retulainen	23 February 2020		Pori, Finland	
Total	329 kg	Eero Retulainen	5 October 2019	Mediterranean Cup	Serravalle, San Marino	
96 kg
Snatch	152 kg	Jesse Nykänen	29 November 2020		Tampere, Finland	
Clean & Jerk	188 kg	Eero Retulainen	7 November 2018	World Championships	Ashgabat, Turkmenistan	
Total	338 kg	Eero Retulainen	11 April 2019	European Championships	Batumi, Georgia	
102 kg
Snatch	148 kg	Roni Peltonen	18 February 2024	European Championships	Sofia, Bulgaria	
Clean & Jerk	193 kg	Hannes Keskitalo	13 September 2023	World Championships	Riyadh, Saudi Arabia	
Total	336 kg	Hannes Keskitalo	13 September 2023	World Championships	Riyadh, Saudi Arabia	
109 kg
Snatch	156 kg	Hannes Keskitalo	26 November 2022		Tampere, Finland	
Clean & Jerk	203 kg	Hannes Keskitalo	10 March 2024		Kalajoki, Finland	
Total	358 kg	Hannes Keskitalo	26 November 2022		Tampere, Finland	
+109 kg
Snatch	161 kg	Matias Tuovinen	7 July 2024		Orivesi, Finland	
Clean & Jerk	202 kg	Matias Tuovinen	7 July 2024		Orivesi, Finland	
Total	363 kg	Matias Tuovinen	7 July 2024		Orivesi, Finland	

=== Men (1998–2018) ===
Event	Record	Athlete	Date	Meet	Place	Ref
–56 kg
Snatch	95 kg	Jarkko Welling	3 March 2001		Pori, Finland	
Clean & Jerk	123 kg	Jarkko Welling	3 March 2001		Pori, Finland	
Total	217 kg	Jarkko Welling	3 March 2001		Pori, Finland	
–62 kg
Snatch	120 kg	Jyrki Welling	14 March 1998		Parkano, Finland	
Clean & Jerk	147 kg	Jyrki Welling	29 April 1998	European Championships	Riesa, Germany	
Total	265 kg	Jyrki Welling	14 March 1998		Parkano, Finland	
–69 kg
Snatch	131 kg	Jouni Grönman	3 March 2001		Pori, Finland	
Clean & Jerk	160 kg	Jouni Grönman	24 April 1999		Kankaanpää, Finland	
Total	290 kg	Jouni Grönman	24 April 1999		Kankaanpää, Finland	
–77 kg
Snatch	150 kg	Ali Oksala	29 October 2000		Tampere, Finland	
Clean & Jerk	185 kg	Ali Oksala	12 October 2000	European Junior Championships	Rijeka, Croatia	
Total	332 kg	Ali Oksala	29 October 2000		Tampere, Finland	
–85 kg
Snatch	152 kg	Milko Tokola	13 April 2016	European Championships	Førde, Norway	
Clean & Jerk	186 kg	Miika Antti-Roiko	23 May 2009		Kalajoki, Finland	
Total	335 kg	Milko Tokola	13 April 2016	European Championships	Førde, Norway	
–94 kg
Snatch	162 kg	Benjamin Pirkkiö	22 May 1998		Sofia, Bulgaria	
Clean & Jerk	201 kg	Miika Antti-Roiko	11 April 2014	European Championships	Tel Aviv, Israel	
Total	360 kg	Benjamin Pirkkiö	7 July 1999	World Junior Championships	Savannah, United States	
–105 kg
Snatch	175 kg	Miikka Huhtala	9 October 2004		Lempäälä, Finland	
Clean & Jerk	212 kg	Janne Kanerva	14 November 1998		Lahti, Finland	
Total	380 kg	Janne Kanerva	14 November 1998		Lahti, Finland	
+105 kg
Snatch	174 kg	Antti Everi	20 April 2008	European Championships	Lignano Sabbiadoro, Italy	
Clean & Jerk	217 kg	Mika Reijonen	28 November 1999	World Championships	Athens, Greece	
Total	382 kg	Mika Reijonen	28 November 1999	World Championships	Athens, Greece	

=== Women (2025–2026) ===
Event	Record	Athlete	Date	Meet	Place	Ref
48 kg
Snatch	70 kg	Sonja Koponen	17 January 2026		Tampere, Finland	
Clean & Jerk	88 kg	Sonja Koponen	14 June 2025		Tampere, Finland	
Total	158 kg	Sonja Koponen	17 January 2026		Tampere, Finland	
58 kg
Snatch	91 kg	Standard				
Clean & Jerk	113 kg	Standard				
Total	202 kg	Standard				
63 kg
Snatch	91 kg	Standard				
Clean & Jerk	115 kg	Standard				
Total	203 kg	Standard				

=== Women (2018–2025) ===
Event	Record	Athlete	Date	Meet	Place	Ref
45 kg
Snatch	67 kg	Sonja Koponen	25 February 2025		Kokkola, Finland	
Clean & Jerk	83 kg	Sonja Koponen	25 February 2025		Kokkola, Finland	
Total	150 kg	Sonja Koponen	25 February 2025		Kokkola, Finland	
49 kg
Snatch	70 kg	Kirsi-Marja Mukkala	18 June 2021		Kouvola, Finland	
Clean & Jerk	84 kg	Sonja Koponen	29 March 2025		Tampere, Finland	
Total	153 kg	Sonja Koponen	17 May 2025		Tampere, Finland	
55 kg
Snatch	81 kg	Anette Kirkanen	25 February 2025		Kokkola, Finland	
Clean & Jerk	99 kg	Laura Liukkonen	22 February 2020		Pori, Finland	
Total	176 kg	Anette Kirkanen	25 February 2025		Kokkola, Finland	
59 kg
Snatch	95 kg	Saara Retulainen	14 February 2024	European Championships	Sofia, Bulgaria	
Clean & Jerk	119 kg	Saara Retulainen	14 February 2024	European Championships	Sofia, Bulgaria	
Total	214 kg	Saara Retulainen	14 February 2024	European Championships	Sofia, Bulgaria	
64 kg
Snatch	95 kg	Anni Vuohijoki	5 November 2018	World Championships	Ashgabat, Turkmenistan	
Clean & Jerk	121 kg	Saara Retulainen	23 November 2024		Tampere, Finland	
Total	214 kg	Saara Retulainen	8 March 2024		Kalajoki, Finland	
71 kg
Snatch	107 kg	Janette Ylisoini	17 April 2025	European Championships	Chișinău, Moldova	
Clean & Jerk	125 kg	Janette Ylisoini	9 March 2024		Kalajoki, Finland	
Total	232 kg	Janette Ylisoini	17 April 2025	European Championships	Chișinău, Moldova	
76 kg
Snatch	104 kg	Janette Ylisoini	19 October 2024	Nordic Championships	Runavík, Denmark	
Clean & Jerk	129 kg	Janette Ylisoini	29 March 2025		Kerava, Finland	
Total	233 kg	Janette Ylisoini	29 March 2025		Kerava, Finland	
81 kg
Snatch	95 kg	Meri Ilmarinen	15 March 2019		Vihti, Finland	
Clean & Jerk	120 kg	Meri Ilmarinen	15 March 2019		Vihti, Finland	
Total	215 kg	Meri Ilmarinen	15 March 2019		Vihti, Finland	
87 kg
Snatch	97 kg	Standard				
Clean & Jerk	121 kg	Meri Ilmarinen	10 April 2021	European Championships	Moscow, Russia	
Total	215 kg	Meri Ilmarinen	10 April 2021	European Championships	Moscow, Russia	
+87 kg
Snatch	100 kg	Standard				
Clean & Jerk	120 kg	Standard				
Total	220 kg	Standard				

=== Women (1998–2018) ===
Event	Record	Athlete	Date	Meet	Place	Ref
–48 kg
Snatch	67 kg	Kirsi-Marja Mukkala	1 September 2018		Tampere, Finland	
Clean & Jerk	83 kg	Sini Kukkonen	10 April 2016	European Championships	Førde, Norway	
Total	148 kg	Sini Kukkonen	10 April 2016	European Championships	Førde, Norway	
–53 kg
Snatch	82 kg	Heidi Harju	20 March 2004		Oulu, Finland	
Clean & Jerk	95 kg	Heidi Harju	20 March 2004		Oulu, Finland	
Total	177 kg	Heidi Harju	20 March 2004		Oulu, Finland	
–58 kg
Snatch	86 kg	Heidi Harju	18 September 2010	World Championships	Antalya, Turkey	
Clean & Jerk	104 kg	Laura Liukkonen	18 February 2017	Finnish Championships	Rovaniemi, Finland	
Total	188 kg	Heidi Harju	13 April 2011	European Championships	Kazan, Russia	
–63 kg
Snatch	91 kg	Saara Leskinen	25 February 2018		Tampere, Finland	
Clean & Jerk	115 kg	Anni Vuohijoki	1 September 2018		Tampere, Finland	
Total	204 kg	Anni Vuohijoki	1 September 2018		Tampere, Finland	
–69 kg
Snatch	94 kg	Anni Vuohijoki	11 May 2018		Meissen, Germany	
Clean & Jerk	118 kg	Anni Vuohijoki	26 May 2018		Gennevilliers, France	
Total	208 kg	Anni Vuohijoki	4 April 2017		Rovaniemi, Finland	
–75 kg
Snatch	105 kg	Karoliina Lundahl	13 November 1998		Lahti, Finland	
Clean & Jerk	127 kg	Karoliina Lundahl	23 April 2001	European Championships	Trenčín, Slovakia	
Total	230 kg	Karoliina Lundahl	13 November 1998		Lahti, Finland	
–90 kg
Snatch	107 kg	Karoliina Lundahl	23 October 1999		St. Joseph, United States	
Clean & Jerk	125 kg	Karoliina Lundahl	23 October 1999		St. Joseph, United States	
Total	232 kg	Karoliina Lundahl	23 October 1999		St. Joseph, United States	
+90 kg
Snatch	100 kg	Standard				
Clean & Jerk	120 kg	Standard				
Total	220 kg	Standard				
