= List of Panamerican junior records in Olympic weightlifting =

This is the list of Panamerican junior records in Olympic weightlifting. They are the best results set in competition by athletes aged 20 or younger throughout the entire calendar year of the performance. Records are maintained in each weight class for the snatch, clean and jerk, and the total for both by the Pan American Weightlifting Federation (PAWF).

== Current records ==
Key to tables: Awaiting ratification Not ratified or later rescinded by PAWF

=== Men ===
Event	Record	Athlete	Nation	Date	Meet	Place	Age	Ref
60 kg
Snatch	124 kg	José González	Colombia	11 March 2025	Pan American Junior Championships	Havana, Cuba	19 years, 265 days	
Clean & Jerk	158 kg	PAWF Standard						
Total	279 kg	PAWF Standard						
65 kg
Snatch	132 kg	PAWF Standard						
Clean & Jerk	167 kg	PAWF Standard						
Total	295 kg	PAWF Standard						
70 kg
Snatch	138 kg	PAWF Standard						
Clean & Jerk	172 kg	PAWF Standard						
Total	307 kg	PAWF Standard						
75 kg
Snatch	146 kg	PAWF Standard						
Clean & Jerk	179 kg	PAWF Standard						
Total	322 kg	PAWF Standard						
85 kg
Snatch	164 kg	Ángel Rodríguez	Venezuela	16 September 2026	South American Games	Rosario, Argentina	20 years, 23 days	
Snatch	165 kg	Ángel Rodríguez	Venezuela	6 October 2026	Pan American Junior Championships	Tepic, Mexico	20 years, 43 days	
Snatch	166 kg	Ángel Rodríguez	Venezuela	29 August 2026	South American Junior Championships	Guayaquil, Ecuador	20 years, 5 days	
Snatch	170 kg	Ángel Rodríguez	Venezuela	2 November 2026	World Championships	Ningbo, China	20 years, 70 days	
Clean & Jerk	203 kg	Ángel Rodríguez	Venezuela	16 September 2026	South American Games	Rosario, Argentina	20 years, 23 days	
Total	367 kg	Ángel Rodríguez	Venezuela	16 September 2026	South American Games	Rosario, Argentina	20 years, 23 days	
95 kg
Snatch	165 kg	PAWF Standard						
Clean & Jerk	201 kg	PAWF Standard						
Total	364 kg	PAWF Standard						
110 kg
Snatch	171 kg	Matheus Pessanha	Brazil	14 March 2025	Pan American Junior Championships	Havana, Cuba	19 years, 199 days	
Clean & Jerk	212 kg	Matheus Pessanha	Brazil	22 August 2025	Junior Pan American Games	Asunción, Paraguay	19 years, 360 days	
Total	382 kg	Matheus Pessanha	Brazil	14 March 2025	Pan American Junior Championships	Havana, Cuba	19 years, 199 days	
+110 kg
Snatch	170 kg	Gabriel Portela	Brazil	17 September 2026	South American Games	Rosario, Argentina	20 years, 58 days	
Snatch	175 kg	Gabriel Portela	Brazil	30 August 2026	South American Junior Championships	Guayaquil, Ecuador	20 years, 40 days	
Clean & Jerk	211 kg	Gabriel Portela	Brazil	17 September 2026	South American Games	Rosario, Argentina	20 years, 58 days	
Total	381 kg	Gabriel Portela	Brazil	17 September 2026	South American Games	Rosario, Argentina	20 years, 58 days	
Total	385 kg	Gabriel Portela	Brazil	30 August 2026	South American Junior Championships	Guayaquil, Ecuador	20 years, 40 days	

=== Women ===
Event	Record	Athlete	Nation	Date	Meet	Place	Age	Ref
49 kg
Snatch	82 kg	PAWF Standard						
Clean & Jerk	103 kg	PAWF Standard						
Total	183 kg	PAWF Standard						
53 kg
Snatch	87 kg	PAWF Standard						
Clean & Jerk	109 kg	PAWF Standard						
Total	195 kg	PAWF Standard						
57 kg
Snatch	92 kg	PAWF Standard						
Clean & Jerk	114 kg	PAWF Standard						
Clean & Jerk	115 kg	Yilihannys Jiménez	Venezuela	27 August 2026	South American Junior Championships	Guayaquil, Ecuador	19 years, 333 days	
Total	204 kg	PAWF Standard						
Total	205 kg	Yilihannys Jiménez	Venezuela	27 August 2026	South American Junior Championships	Guayaquil, Ecuador	19 years, 333 days	
61 kg
Snatch	97 kg	PAWF Standard						
Snatch	98 kg	María Paz Casadevall	Argentina	6 October 2026	Pan American Junior Championships	Tepic, Mexico	19 years, 72 days	
Clean & Jerk	119 kg	PAWF Standard						
Clean & Jerk	120 kg	María Paz Casadevall	Argentina	28 August 2026	South American Junior Championships	Guayaquil, Ecuador	19 years, 33 days	
Clean & Jerk	121 kg	María Paz Casadevall	Argentina	6 October 2026	Pan American Junior Championships	Tepic, Mexico	19 years, 72 days	
Total	214 kg	PAWF Standard						
Total	219 kg	María Paz Casadevall	Argentina	6 October 2026	Pan American Junior Championships	Tepic, Mexico	19 years, 72 days	
69 kg
Snatch	110 kg	Charlotte Simoneau	Canada	22 August 2025	Junior Pan American Games	Asunción, Paraguay	20 years, 84 days	
Clean & Jerk	133 kg	Claudia Rengifo	Venezuela	16 September 2026	South American Games	Rosario, Argentina	19 years, 312 days	
Total	243 kg	Claudia Rengifo	Venezuela	16 September 2026	South American Games	Rosario, Argentina	19 years, 312 days	
77 kg
Snatch	115 kg	María Mena	Colombia	11 December 2025	Central American & Caribbean Championships	Santo Domingo, Dominican Republic	20 years, 289 days	
Clean & Jerk	137 kg	María Mena	Colombia	11 December 2025	Central American & Caribbean Championships	Santo Domingo, Dominican Republic	20 years, 289 days	
Total	252 kg	María Mena	Colombia	11 December 2025	Central American & Caribbean Championships	Santo Domingo, Dominican Republic	20 years, 289 days	
86 kg
Snatch	113 kg	PAWF Standard						
Clean & Jerk	144 kg	PAWF Standard						
Total	257 kg	PAWF Standard						
+86 kg
Snatch	114 kg	Yairan Tysforod	Colombia	25 November 2025	Bolivarian Games	Ayacucho, Peru	19 years, 341 days	
Clean & Jerk	151 kg	PAWF Standard						
Total	258 kg	PAWF Standard						

== Historical records ==
=== Men (2025–2026) ===
Event	Record	Athlete	Nation	Date	Meet	Place	Age	Ref
71 kg
Snatch	141 kg	PAWF Standard						
Clean & Jerk	176 kg	PAWF Standard						
Total	313 kg	PAWF Standard						
79 kg
Snatch	151 kg	PAWF Standard						
Clean & Jerk	186 kg	PAWF Standard						
Total	333 kg	PAWF Standard						
88 kg
Snatch	168 kg	Ángel Rodríguez	Venezuela	24 November 2025	Bolivarian Games	Ayacucho, Peru	19 years, 92 days	
Clean & Jerk	196 kg	PAWF Standard						
Clean & Jerk	197 kg	Ángel Rodríguez	Venezuela	6 May 2026	World Junior Championships	Ismailia, Egypt	19 years, 255 days	
Total	360 kg	Ángel Rodríguez	Venezuela	24 November 2025	Bolivarian Games	Ayacucho, Peru	19 years, 92 days	
Total	365 kg	Ángel Rodríguez	Venezuela	6 May 2026	World Junior Championships	Ismailia, Egypt	19 years, 255 days	
94 kg
Snatch	164 kg	PAWF Standard						
Snatch	166 kg	Mauricio Loaiza	Venezuela	7 May 2026	World Junior Championships	Ismailia, Egypt	19 years, 143 days	
Clean & Jerk	201 kg	PAWF Standard						
Clean & Jerk	207 kg	Mauricio Loaiza	Venezuela	7 May 2026	World Junior Championships	Ismailia, Egypt	19 years, 143 days	
Total	363 kg	Ángel Cuesta	Colombia	19 September 2025	South American Junior Championships	Guayaquil, Ecuador	20 years, 245 days	
Total	373 kg	Mauricio Loaiza	Venezuela	7 May 2026	World Junior Championships	Ismailia, Egypt	19 years, 143 days	

=== Men (2018–2025) ===
Event	Record	Athlete	Nation	Date	Meet	Place	Age	Ref
55 kg
Snatch	112 kg	Jairo García	Colombia	8 December 2018	International Junior CSLP Cup	Guayaquil, Ecuador	18 years, 128 days	
Clean & Jerk	136 kg	Jairo García	Colombia	9 May 2019	South American Championships	Palmira, Colombia	18 years, 280 days	
Total	247 kg	Jairo García	Colombia	8 December 2018	International Junior CSLP Cup	Guayaquil, Ecuador	18 years, 128 days	
61 kg
Snatch	130 kg	Cristian Zurita	Ecuador	2 November 2018	World Championships	Ashgabat, Turkmenistan	20 years, 265 days	
Clean & Jerk	176 kg	Hampton Morris	United States	2 April 2024	World Cup	Phuket, Thailand	20 years, 45 days	
Total	303 kg	Hampton Morris	United States	2 April 2024	World Cup	Phuket, Thailand	20 years, 45 days	
67 kg
Snatch	139 kg	Sebastián Olivares	Colombia	21 September 2024	Junior World Championships	León, Spain	19 years, 299 days	
Clean & Jerk	178 kg	Hampton Morris	United States	17 November 2023	Junior World Championships	Guadalajara, Mexico	19 years, 291 days	
Total	304 kg	Sebastián Olivares	Colombia	21 September 2024	Junior World Championships	León, Spain	19 years, 299 days	
Total	305 kg	Sebastián Olivares	Colombia	27 November 2024	Bolivarian Games	Ayacucho, Peru	20 years, 0 days	
73 kg
Snatch	154 kg	Clarence Cummings	United States	27 June 2019	Pan American Junior Championships	Havana, Cuba	19 years, 21 days	
Clean & Jerk	193 kg	Clarence Cummings	United States	27 June 2019	Pan American Junior Championships	Havana, Cuba	19 years, 21 days	
Total	347 kg	Clarence Cummings	United States	27 June 2019	Pan American Junior Championships	Havana, Cuba	19 years, 21 days	
81 kg
Snatch	158 kg	Harrison Maurus	United States	29 January 2020	World Cup	Rome, Italy	19 years, 337 days	
Snatch	161 kg	Ángel Rodríguez	Venezuela	28 November 2024	Bolivarian Games	Ayacucho, Peru	18 years, 96 days	
Clean & Jerk	200 kg	Harrison Maurus	United States	5 November 2018	World Championships	Ashgabat, Turkmenistan	18 years, 252 days	
Total	357 kg	Harrison Maurus	United States	5 November 2018	World Championships	Ashgabat, Turkmenistan	18 years, 252 days	
89 kg
Snatch	169 kg	Keydomar Vallenilla	Venezuela	23 September 2019	World Championships	Pattaya, Thailand	19 years, 350 days	
Clean & Jerk	204 kg	Keydomar Vallenilla	Venezuela	6 November 2018	World Championships	Ashgabat, Turkmenistan	19 years, 29 days	
Total	369 kg	Keydomar Vallenilla	Venezuela	6 November 2018	World Championships	Ashgabat, Turkmenistan	19 years, 29 days	
96 kg
Snatch	176 kg	Jhonatan Rivas	Colombia	7 November 2018	World Championships	Ashgabat, Turkmenistan	20 years, 119 days	
Clean & Jerk	205 kg	Keydomar Vallenilla	Venezuela	29 July 2019	Pan American Games	Lima, Peru	19 years, 294 days	
Total	377 kg	Jhonatan Rivas	Colombia	7 November 2018	World Championships	Ashgabat, Turkmenistan	20 years, 119 days	
102 kg
Snatch	168 kg	Matheus Pessanha	Brazil	26 September 2024	World Junior Championships	León, Spain	19 years, 30 days	
Snatch	175 kg	Matheus Pessanha	Brazil	4 May 2025	Junior World Championships	Lima, Peru	19 years, 250 days	
Clean & Jerk	215 kg	Matheus Pessanha	Brazil	26 September 2024	World Junior Championships	León, Spain	19 years, 30 days	
Clean & Jerk	220 kg	Matheus Pessanha	Brazil	4 May 2025	Junior World Championships	Lima, Peru	19 years, 250 days	
Total	383 kg	Matheus Pessanha	Brazil	26 September 2024	World Junior Championships	León, Spain	19 years, 30 days	
Total	395 kg	Matheus Pessanha	Brazil	4 May 2025	Junior World Championships	Lima, Peru	19 years, 250 days	
109 kg
Snatch	163 kg	Josué Medina	Mexico	8 November 2018	World Championships	Ashgabat, Turkmenistan	20 years, 146 days	
Clean & Jerk	201 kg	Luis Quiñones	Colombia	28 November 2021	Junior Pan American Games	Palmira, Colombia	20 years, 329 days	
Total	356 kg	Luis Quiñones	Colombia	28 November 2021	Junior Pan American Games	Palmira, Colombia	20 years, 329 days	
+109 kg
Snatch	160 kg	Ezequiel Germán	Dominican Republic	29 July 2022	Pan American Championships	Bogotá, Colombia	19 years, 307 days	
Clean & Jerk	200 kg	Jhonatan Hoyos	Colombia	7 December 2019	South American Junior Championships	Buenos Aires, Argentina	20 years, 284 days	
Clean & Jerk	203 kg	Alonso Bizama	Chile	29 November 2024	Bolivarian Games	Ayacucho, Peru	20 years, 19 days	
Total	351 kg	Alonso Bizama	Chile	27 September 2024	World Junior Championships	León, Spain	19 years, 322 days	
Total	363 kg	Alonso Bizama	Chile	29 November 2024	Bolivarian Games	Ayacucho, Peru	20 years, 19 days	

=== Women (2025–2026) ===
Event	Record	Athlete	Nation	Date	Meet	Place	Age	Ref
48 kg
Snatch	81 kg	PAWF Standard						
Clean & Jerk	101 kg	PAWF Standard						
Total	181 kg	PAWF Standard						
58 kg
Snatch	98 kg	Gelen Torres	Colombia	20 August 2025	Junior Pan American Games	Asunción, Paraguay	19 years, 187 days	
Clean & Jerk	116 kg	PAWF Standard						
Clean & Jerk	121 kg	Joseline López	Mexico	3 May 2026	World Junior Championships	Ismailia, Egypt	19 years, 176 days	
Total	213 kg	Gelen Torres	Colombia	20 August 2025	Junior Pan American Games	Asunción, Paraguay	19 years, 187 days	
63 kg
Snatch	101 kg	Sophia Shaft	United States	5 October 2025	World Championships	Førde, Norway	20 years, 237 days	
Clean & Jerk	126 kg	Sophia Shaft	United States	5 October 2025	World Championships	Førde, Norway	20 years, 237 days	
Total	227 kg	Sophia Shaft	United States	5 October 2025	World Championships	Førde, Norway	20 years, 237 days	

=== Women (2018–2025) ===
Event	Record	Athlete	Nation	Date	Meet	Place	Age	Ref
45 kg
Snatch	76 kg	Ludia Montero	Cuba	18 September 2019	World Championships	Pattaya, Thailand	20 years, 154 days	
Clean & Jerk	96 kg	Manuela Berrío	Colombia	9 May 2019	South American Championships	Palmira, Colombia	18 years, 325 days	
Total	171 kg	Manuela Berrío	Colombia	25 June 2019	Pan American Junior Championships	Havana, Cuba	19 years, 7 days	
49 kg
Snatch	83 kg	Dahiana Ortiz	Dominican Republic	26 November 2021	Junior Pan American Games	Palmira, Colombia	19 years, 364 days	
Clean & Jerk	103 kg	Yesica Hernández	Mexico	19 October 2021	Pan American Junior Championships	Guadalajara, Mexico	19 years, 308 days	
Total	185 kg	Dahiana Ortiz	Dominican Republic	26 November 2021	Junior Pan American Games	Palmira, Colombia	19 years, 364 days	
55 kg
Snatch	94 kg	Yenny Sinisterra	Colombia	28 July 2019	Pan American Games	Lima, Peru	19 years, 85 days	
Clean & Jerk	116 kg	Yenny Sinisterra	Colombia	20 September 2019	World Championships	Pattaya, Thailand	19 years, 139 days	
Total	210 kg	Yenny Sinisterra	Colombia	20 September 2019	World Championships	Pattaya, Thailand	19 years, 139 days	
59 kg
Snatch	97 kg	Miranda Ulrey	United States	21 June 2024	Pan American Junior Championships	Palmira, Colombia	19 years, 272 days	
Clean & Jerk	120 kg	Rosalba Morales	Colombia	10 December 2018	International Junior CSLP Cup	Guayaquil, Ecuador	20 years, 26 days	
Total	214 kg	Eduarda Souza	Brazil	8 September 2023	World Championships	Riyadh, Saudi Arabia	18 years, 315 days	
64 kg
Snatch	105 kg	Angie Palacios	Ecuador	29 July 2019	Pan American Games	Lima, Peru	18 years, 320 days	
Clean & Jerk	130 kg	Ingrid Segura	Colombia	22 September 2024	Junior World Championships	León, Spain	18 years, 85 days	
Clean & Jerk	132 kg	Ingrid Segura	Colombia	10 December 2024	World Championships	Manama, Bahrain	18 years, 164 days	
Total	231 kg	Ingrid Segura	Colombia	22 September 2024	Junior World Championships	León, Spain	18 years, 85 days	
Total	235 kg	Ingrid Segura	Colombia	10 December 2024	World Championships	Manama, Bahrain	18 years, 164 days	
71 kg
Snatch	115 kg	Olivia Reeves	United States	10 December 2023	IWF Grand Prix	Doha, Qatar	20 years, 235 days	
Clean & Jerk	147 kg	Olivia Reeves	United States	10 December 2023	IWF Grand Prix	Doha, Qatar	20 years, 235 days	
Total	262 kg	Olivia Reeves	United States	10 December 2023	IWF Grand Prix	Doha, Qatar	20 years, 235 days	
76 kg
Snatch	117 kg	Neisi Dájomes	Ecuador	7 November 2018	World Championships	Ashgabat, Turkmenistan	20 years, 179 days	
Clean & Jerk	142 kg	Neisi Dájomes	Ecuador	7 November 2018	World Championships	Ashgabat, Turkmenistan	20 years, 179 days	
Total	259 kg	Neisi Dájomes	Ecuador	7 November 2018	World Championships	Ashgabat, Turkmenistan	20 years, 179 days	
81 kg
Snatch	114 kg	Olivia Reeves	United States	23 October 2023	Pan American Games	Santiago, Chile	20 years, 187 days	
Clean & Jerk	144 kg	Olivia Reeves	United States	23 October 2023	Pan American Games	Santiago, Chile	20 years, 187 days	
Total	258 kg	Olivia Reeves	United States	23 October 2023	Pan American Games	Santiago, Chile	20 years, 187 days	
87 kg
Snatch	103 kg	Elizabeth Reyes	Cuba	26 June 2023	CAC Games	San Salvador, El Salvador	19 years, 262 days	
Snatch	109 kg	Mairyn Hernández	Mexico	5 May 2025	Junior World Championships	Lima, Peru	19 years, 279 days	
Clean & Jerk	135 kg	Elizabeth Reyes	Cuba	26 June 2023	CAC Games	San Salvador, El Salvador	19 years, 262 days	
Total	238 kg	Elizabeth Reyes	Cuba	26 June 2023	CAC Games	San Salvador, El Salvador	19 years, 262 days	
Total	244 kg	Mairyn Hernández	Mexico	5 May 2025	Junior World Championships	Lima, Peru	19 years, 279 days	
+87 kg
Snatch	116 kg	Lisseth Ayoví	Ecuador	10 November 2018	World Championships	Ashgabat, Turkmenistan	20 years, 95 days	
Clean & Jerk	155 kg	Marifélix Sarría	Cuba	27 September 2024	World Junior Championships	León, Spain	20 years, 33 days	
Clean & Jerk	157 kg	Marifélix Sarría	Cuba	15 December 2024	World Championships	Manama, Bahrain	20 years, 112 days	
Total	270 kg	Marifélix Sarría	Cuba	27 September 2024	World Junior Championships	León, Spain	20 years, 33 days	
