= 2024 World Junior Weightlifting Championships =

2024 IWF World Junior Championships
- Venue: Palacio de Congresos y Exposiciones de León
- Location: León, Spain
- Dates: 19–27 September
- Competitors: 350 from 64 nations

The 2024 Junior World Weightlifting Championships was a weightlifting competition that was held in León, Spain, from 19 to 27 September 2024.

== Medal table ==
Ranking by Big (Total result) medals

* Host nation (Spain)

Rank	Nation	Gold	Silver	Bronze	Total
1	United States	4	2	0	6
2	South Korea	2	1	0	3
3	Philippines	2	0	0	2
3	Vietnam	2	0	0	2
5	Colombia	1	2	3	6
–	Individual Neutral Athletes	1	2	0	3
6	Egypt	1	1	2	4
7	Canada	1	1	0	2
7	Japan	1	1	0	2
9	Armenia	1	0	3	4
10	Kazakhstan	1	0	1	2
11	Chinese Taipei	1	0	0	1
11	Cuba	1	0	0	1
11	Turkmenistan	1	0	0	1
14	Turkey	0	3	0	3
15	Thailand	0	2	0	2
16	Brazil	0	1	1	2
16	Ecuador	0	1	1	2
16	Romania	0	1	1	2
19	Iran	0	1	0	1
19	Mexico	0	1	0	1
21	Georgia	0	0	2	2
22	Finland	0	0	1	1
22	IWF Refugee Team	0	0	1	1
22	India	0	0	1	1
22	Libya	0	0	1	1
22	Spain*	0	0	1	1
22	Uzbekistan	0	0	1	1
Totals (27 entries)		20	20	20	60

Ranking by all medals: Big (Total result) and Small (Snatch and Clean & Jerk)

* Host nation (Spain)

Rank	Nation	Gold	Silver	Bronze	Total
1	United States	10	8	0	18
2	Colombia	5	6	9	20
3	Vietnam	5	1	1	7
–	Individual Neutral Athletes	4	5	0	9
4	South Korea	4	4	0	8
5	Egypt	4	2	4	10
6	Philippines	4	2	1	7
7	Canada	3	2	0	5
8	Chinese Taipei	3	1	0	4
9	Turkmenistan	3	0	1	4
10	Cuba	3	0	0	3
11	Japan	2	3	3	8
12	Romania	2	2	1	5
13	Armenia	2	1	5	8
14	Kazakhstan	2	1	1	4
15	Turkey	1	6	2	9
16	Thailand	1	3	2	6
17	Uzbekistan	1	2	1	4
18	Mexico	1	1	2	4
19	Brazil	0	4	3	7
20	Georgia	0	2	3	5
21	Iran	0	2	2	4
22	Ecuador	0	1	5	6
23	IWF Refugee Team	0	1	1	2
24	Libya	0	0	3	3
25	India	0	0	2	2
25	Spain*	0	0	2	2
27	Albania	0	0	1	1
27	Finland	0	0	1	1
27	Great Britain	0	0	1	1
27	Jordan	0	0	1	1
27	New Zealand	0	0	1	1
27	Venezuela	0	0	1	1
Totals (32 entries)		60	60	60	180

== Medalists ==
=== Men ===
Event	Gold		Silver		Bronze	
55 kg
Snatch	K'Dương; Vietnam	115 kg YWR	Kotaro Tomari; Japan	108 kg	Dhanush Loganathan; India	107 kg
Clean & Jerk	Đỗ Tú Tùng; Vietnam	140 kg	Kotaro Tomari; Japan	139 kg	K'Dương; Vietnam	138 kg
Total	K'Dương; Vietnam	253 kg	Kotaro Tomari; Japan	247 kg	Dhanush Loganathan; India	231 kg
61 kg
Snatch	Hampton Morris; United States	126 kg	Gabriel Chhum; United States	125 kg	José González; Colombia	124 kg
Clean & Jerk	Hampton Morris; United States	165 kg	Gabriel Chhum; United States	153 kg	Adolfo Tun; Mexico	150 kg
Total	Hampton Morris; United States	291 kg	Gabriel Chhum; United States	278 kg	Elsayed El-Araby; Egypt	271 kg
67 kg
Snatch	Kaan Kahriman; Turkey	143 kg	Trần Minh Trí; Vietnam	142 kg	Sebastián Olivares; Colombia	139 kg JAM
Clean & Jerk	Trần Minh Trí; Vietnam	171 kg	Kaan Kahriman; Turkey	169 kg	Daniel Caicedo; Colombia	167 kg
Total	Trần Minh Trí; Vietnam	313 kg	Kaan Kahriman; Turkey	312 kg	Sebastián Olivares; Colombia	304 kg JAM
73 kg
Snatch	Tiberiu Donose; Romania	149 kg	Khusinboy Matrasulov; Uzbekistan	148 kg	Mohammed Alzintani; Libya	146 kg
Clean & Jerk	Caden Cahoy; United States	180 kg	Tiberiu Donose; Romania	174 kg	Mohammed Alzintani; Libya	171 kg
Total	Caden Cahoy; United States	326 kg	Tiberiu Donose; Romania	323 kg	Mohammed Alzintani; Libya	317 kg
81 kg
Snatch	Mohamed Abdelrahman; Egypt	161 kg	Kwon Dae-hee; South Korea	156 kg	Goga Jajvani; Georgia	155 kg
Clean & Jerk	Kwon Dae-hee; South Korea	200 kg	Yerasyl Saulebekov; Kazakhstan	190 kg	Mohamed Abdelrahman; Egypt	189 kg
Total	Kwon Dae-hee; South Korea	356 kg	Mohamed Abdelrahman; Egypt	350 kg	Yerasyl Saulebekov; Kazakhstan	344 kg
89 kg
Snatch	Diyorbek Ermatov; Uzbekistan	162 kg	Jokser Albornoz; Colombia	158 kg	Alireza Abbaspour; Iran	156 kg
Clean & Jerk	Yedige Yemberdi; Kazakhstan	199 kg	Alireza Abbaspour; Iran	195 kg	Jokser Albornoz; Colombia	192 kg
Total	Yedige Yemberdi; Kazakhstan	352 kg	Alireza Abbaspour; Iran	351 kg	Jokser Albornoz; Colombia	350 kg
96 kg
Snatch	Masashi Nishikawa; Japan	171 kg	Ihnatsi Pauliukavets; Individual Neutral Athletes	164 kg	Kofsha Ertjan; Albania	161 kg
Clean & Jerk	Sergio Muñoz; Colombia	198 kg	Ihnatsi Pauliukavets; Individual Neutral Athletes	196 kg	Masashi Nishikawa; Japan	195 kg
Total	Masashi Nishikawa; Japan	366 kg	Ihnatsi Pauliukavets; Individual Neutral Athletes	360 kg	Sergio Muñoz; Colombia	355 kg
102 kg
Snatch	Şahzadbek Matýakubow; Turkmenistan	175 kg	Mahmoud Hassan; Egypt	169 kg	Matheus Pessanha; Brazil	168 kg JAM
Clean & Jerk	Şahzadbek Matýakubow; Turkmenistan	216 kg JWR	Matheus Pessanha; Brazil	215 kg AM	Mahmoud Hassan; Egypt	200 kg
Total	Şahzadbek Matýakubow; Turkmenistan	391 kg	Matheus Pessanha; Brazil	383 kg JAM	Mahmoud Hassan; Egypt	369 kg
109 kg
Snatch	Uladzislau Sakovich; Individual Neutral Athletes	170 kg	Muhammed Emin Burun; Turkey	168 kg	Hassan Emadi; Iran	163 kg
Clean & Jerk	Uladzislau Sakovich; Individual Neutral Athletes	204 kg	Gurami Vekua; Georgia	200 kg	Asem Al-Sallaj; Jordan	199 kg
Total	Uladzislau Sakovich; Individual Neutral Athletes	374 kg	Muhammed Emin Burun; Turkey	366 kg	Gurami Vekua; Georgia	362 kg
+109 kg
Snatch	Robert Kurouski; Individual Neutral Athletes	170 kg	Szymon Ziolkowski; Poland	170 kg	Numi Tepulolo; New Zealand	161 kg
Clean & Jerk	Nam Ji-yong; South Korea	223 kg	Robert Kurouski; Individual Neutral Athletes	212 kg	Ashot Movsisyan; Armenia	208 kg
Total	Nam Ji-yong; South Korea	383 kg	Robert Kurouski; Individual Neutral Athletes	382 kg	Ashot Movsisyan; Armenia	366 kg

=== Women ===
Event	Gold		Silver		Bronze	
45 kg
Snatch	Angeline Colonia; Philippines	74 kg	Khemika Kamnoedsri; Thailand	73 kg	Ezgi Kılıç; Turkey	70 kg
Clean & Jerk	Ioana Miron; Romania	88 kg	Angeline Colonia; Philippines	88 kg	Khemika Kamnoedsri; Thailand	87 kg
Total	Angeline Colonia; Philippines	162 kg	Khemika Kamnoedsri; Thailand	160 kg	Ioana Miron; Romania	154 kg
49 kg
Snatch	Karoll López; Colombia	80 kg	Lovely Inan; Philippines	79 kg	Kerlys Montilla; Venezuela	76 kg
Clean & Jerk	Lovely Inan; Philippines	100 kg	Karoll López; Colombia	98 kg	Naruemol Vonghajak; Thailand	97 kg
Total	Lovely Inan; Philippines	179 kg	Karoll López; Colombia	178 kg	Lucía González; Spain	170 kg
55 kg
Snatch	Chen Guan-ling; Chinese Taipei	98 kg JWR	Gelen Torres; Colombia	89 kg	Jhodie Peralta; Philippines	85 kg
Clean & Jerk	Chen Guan-ling; Chinese Taipei	119 kg JWR	Aleksandra Grigoryan; Armenia	110 kg	Yusa Sato; Japan	106 kg
Total	Chen Guan-ling; Chinese Taipei	217 kg JWR	Gelen Torres; Colombia	192 kg	Aleksandra Grigoryan; Armenia	191 kg
59 kg
Snatch	Thanaporn Saetia; Thailand	96 kg	Miranda Ulrey; United States	93 kg	Sei Higa; Japan	93 kg
Clean & Jerk	Miranda Ulrey; United States	117 kg	Nigora Abdullaeva; Uzbekistan	115 kg	María Olalla; Spain	113 kg
Total	Miranda Ulrey; United States	210 kg	Thanaporn Saetia; Thailand	209 kg	Nigora Abdullaeva; Uzbekistan	208 kg
64 kg
Snatch	Ingrid Segura; Colombia	101 kg	Katharine Estep; United States	100 kg	Jéssica Palacios; Ecuador	98 kg
Clean & Jerk	Ingrid Segura; Colombia	130 kg JAM	Katharine Estep; United States	122 kg	Jéssica Palacios; Ecuador	120 kg
Total	Ingrid Segura; Colombia	231 kg JAM	Katharine Estep; United States	222 kg	Jéssica Palacios; Ecuador	218 kg
71 kg
Snatch	Charlotte Simoneau; Canada	110 kg	María Mena; Colombia	109 kg	Damary Nazareno; Ecuador	106 kg
Clean & Jerk	Charlotte Simoneau; Canada	130 kg	Chen Hsin-ning; Chinese Taipei	126 kg	Damary Nazareno; Ecuador	125 kg
Total	Charlotte Simoneau; Canada	240 kg	Damary Nazareno; Ecuador	231 kg	Anna Ylisoini; Finland	228 kg
76 kg
Snatch	Ella Nicholson; United States	113 kg	Jeon Hee-soo; South Korea	102 kg	Isabella Brown; Great Britain	101 kg
Clean & Jerk	Ella Nicholson; United States	131 kg	Jeon Hee-soo; South Korea	130 kg	Anna Amroyan; Armenia	128 kg
Total	Ella Nicholson; United States	244 kg	Jeon Hee-soo; South Korea	232 kg YWR	Anna Amroyan; Armenia	228 kg
81 kg
Snatch	Mairyn Hernández; Mexico	104 kg	Yekta Jamali; IWF Refugee Team	104 kg	Anamjan Rüstamowa; Turkmenistan	103 kg
Clean & Jerk	Emma Poghosyan; Armenia	133 kg	Katelyn Witte; United States	129 kg	Mairyn Hernández; Mexico	128 kg
Total	Emma Poghosyan; Armenia	233 kg	Mairyn Hernández; Mexico	232 kg	Yekta Jamali; IWF Refugee Team	231 kg
87 kg
Snatch	Abdelrazek Elsayed; Egypt	110 kg	Mariam Murgvliani; Georgia	105 kg	Büşra Çan; Turkey	104 kg
Clean & Jerk	Abdelrazek Elsayed; Egypt	130 kg	Büşra Çan; Turkey	129 kg	Valeria Ruíz; Colombia	126 kg
Total	Abdelrazek Elsayed; Egypt	240 kg	Büşra Çan; Turkey	233 kg	Mariam Murgvliani; Georgia	230 kg
+87 kg
Snatch	Marifélix Sarría; Cuba	115 kg	Taiane de Lima; Brazil	110 kg	Yairan Tysforod; Colombia	110 kg
Clean & Jerk	Marifélix Sarría; Cuba	155 kg	Etta Love; Canada	146 kg YWR	Taiane de Lima; Brazil	141 kg
Total	Marifélix Sarría; Cuba	270 kg	Etta Love; Canada	254 kg	Taiane de Lima; Brazil	251 kg

== Team ranking ==
=== Men ===
Rank	Team	Points
1	Colombia	617
2	United States	538
3	Turkey	494
4	Kazakhstan	463
5	Georgia	379
6	Spain	371
7	Mexico	364
8	Poland	346
9	Egypt	328
10	Uzbekistan	311

=== Women ===
Rank	Team	Points
1	United States	610
2	Colombia	599
3	Turkey	495
4	Spain	374
5	Mexico	358
6	India	332
7	Canada	314
8	Thailand	307
9	Chinese Taipei	295
10	Philippines	283

== Men's results ==
=== 55 kg ===
Rank	Athlete	Group	Snatch (kg)				Clean & Jerk (kg)				Total
Rank	Athlete	Group	1	2	3	Rank	1	2	3	Rank	Total
1st place, gold medalist(s)	K'Dương (VIE)	A	111	115 YWR	--	1st place, gold medalist(s)	138	~~142~~	--	3rd place, bronze medalist(s)	253
2nd place, silver medalist(s)	Kotaro Tomari (JPN)	A	105	108	~~110~~	2nd place, silver medalist(s)	131	139	~~141~~	2nd place, silver medalist(s)	247
3rd place, bronze medalist(s)	Dhanush Loganathan (IND)	B	100	104	107	3rd place, bronze medalist(s)	120	124	~~127~~	13	231
4	Domingo Meza (ARG)	B	~~95~~	95	100	6	125	130	~~135~~	5	230
5	Ramazan Yılmaz (TUR)	A	95	~~98~~	98	12	131	~~137~~	~~138~~	4	229
6	Jefferson Gómez (VEN)	A	97	101	105	4	~~122~~	122	~~127~~	17	227
7	Yilver Grijalba (COL)	A	100	~~105~~	~~105~~	7	123	127	~~131~~	7	227
8	Eron Borres (PHI)	A	95	100	~~105~~	8	~~127~~	127	~~131~~	8	227
9	Seyran Khudanyan (ARM)	A	~~100~~	100	~~109~~	11	125	~~132~~	~~132~~	11	225
10	Samuel Andrade (COL)	A	97	100	~~102~~	9	122	125	~~129~~	12	225
11	Dzhan Zarkov (BUL)	A	95	~~100~~	~~101~~	17	125	129	~~133~~	6	224
12	Angello Solorzano (VEN)	A	97	~~101~~	101	5	122	~~125~~	~~125~~	15	223
13	Axel Mendoza (MEX)	B	93	~~96~~	97	13	121	125	~~128~~	10	222
14	Prince Keil Delos Santos (PHI)	A	~~100~~	100	~~105~~	10	122	~~127~~	~~127~~	16	222
15	Antonin Lanoue (CAN)	B	95	~~99~~	~~99~~	15	120	125	~~130~~	9	220
16	Tang Chun-yen (TPE)	B	90	~~94~~	95	16	~~120~~	120	124	14	219
17	Ertuğrul Secgin (TUR)	A	96	~~100~~	~~106~~	14	121	~~126~~	~~127~~	18	217
18	Michael Inuma (PER)	B	88	90	~~92~~	19	107	110	113	19	203
19	Oscar Gómez (ESP)	B	87	90	92	18	~~107~~	107	110	20	202
20	Juan Moreno (ESP)	B	85	~~88~~	88	20	103	~~107~~	~~108~~	21	191
—	Đỗ Tú Tùng (VIE)	A	~~112~~	~~112~~	~~112~~	—	~~138~~	~~140~~	140	1st place, gold medalist(s)	—
—	Ali Hasan (KUW)	B	~~63~~	~~63~~	~~63~~	—	75	83	~~90~~	22	—

=== 61 kg ===
Rank	Athlete	Group	Snatch (kg)				Clean & Jerk (kg)				Total
Rank	Athlete	Group	1	2	3	Rank	1	2	3	Rank	Total
1st place, gold medalist(s)	Hampton Morris (USA)	A	122	~~125~~	126	1st place, gold medalist(s)	165	~~171~~	~~177~~	1st place, gold medalist(s)	291
2nd place, silver medalist(s)	Gabriel Chhum (USA)	A	122	~~125~~	125	2nd place, silver medalist(s)	~~151~~	151	153	2nd place, silver medalist(s)	278
3rd place, bronze medalist(s)	Elsayed Elaraby (EGY)	A	115	119	122	5	146	149	~~152~~	4	271
4	José González (COL)	A	120	~~123~~	124	3rd place, bronze medalist(s)	137	142	145	7	269
5	Giga Odikadze (GEO)	A	118	121	123	4	135	140	144	9	267
6	Sergey Chuyev (KAZ)	A	114	~~118~~	118	8	141	147	~~154~~	5	265
7	Meruzhan Yeghoyan (ARM)	A	115	118	~~121~~	7	~~145~~	~~145~~	145	8	263
8	Ion Badanev (MDA)	A	~~115~~	115	~~121~~	13	145	~~151~~	~~151~~	6	260
9	Abdullah Aqeel (KSA)	A	116	~~121~~	~~123~~	9	~~135~~	135	142	12	258
10	Burak Aykun (TUR)	B	110	~~114~~	115	12	137	142	~~145~~	10	257
11	Adolfo Tun (MEX)	B	100	103	106	16	145	~~150~~	150	3rd place, bronze medalist(s)	256
12	Shankar Lapung (IND)	A	113	~~116~~	~~116~~	14	142	~~145~~	~~145~~	11	255
13	Arjunan Ruthreshwar (IND)	B	111	115	~~118~~	11	~~126~~	126	132	13	247
14	Daniel Romero (ESP)	B	100	105	107	15	120	125	130	14	237
15	Fahad Alotaibi (KUW)	B	84	~~89~~	91	17	108	114	119	15	210
—	Dương Tuấn Kiệt (VIE)	A	116	~~120~~	120	6	~~148~~	~~148~~	~~152~~	—	—
—	Elshan Mammadov (AZE)	B	115	~~118~~	--	10	--	--	--	—	—

=== 67 kg ===
Rank	Athlete	Group	Snatch (kg)				Clean & Jerk (kg)				Total
Rank	Athlete	Group	1	2	3	Rank	1	2	3	Rank	Total
1st place, gold medalist(s)	Trần Minh Trí (VIE)	A	136	140	142	2nd place, silver medalist(s)	~~168~~	168	171	1st place, gold medalist(s)	313
2nd place, silver medalist(s)	Kaan Kahriman (TUR)	A	137	141	143	1st place, gold medalist(s)	161	166	169	2nd place, silver medalist(s)	312
3rd place, bronze medalist(s)	Sebastián Olivares (COL)	A	133	136	139 JAM	3rd place, bronze medalist(s)	160	165	~~170~~	5	304 JAM
4	Daniel Caicedo (COL)	A	~~131~~	131	135	5	159	163	167	3rd place, bronze medalist(s)	302
5	Diyorbek Ruzmetov (UZB)	A	135	~~139~~	~~140~~	4	160	~~165~~	~~167~~	6	295
6	Patsaphong Thongsuk (THA)	A	~~126~~	126	~~131~~	9	157	161	166	4	292
7	Fabian Márquez (VEN)	A	126	131	~~133~~	6	157	~~161~~	~~162~~	8	288
8	Artur Yakushau (AIN)	B	122	126	128	7	154	158	~~162~~	7	'286
9	Engin Kara (TUR)	B	~~126~~	~~126~~	126	8	145	150	~~154~~	10	276
10	Herseleid Carrazco (MEX)	B	~~120~~	120	~~127~~	10	152	~~157~~	~~161~~	9	272
11	Dominik Polverini (USA)	B	108	113	~~117~~	13	136	144	~~149~~	11	257
12	Aaron Vallejo (ESP)	B	113	~~119~~	119	12	130	131	~~141~~	12	250
13	Luis Sepulveda (CHI)	B	93	99	105	14	116	121	~~125~~	13	226
14	Ricardo Santos (POR)	B	80	85	90	15	105	111	~~116~~	14	201
—	Albert Delos Santos (PHI)	A	120	~~125~~	~~125~~	11	--	--	--	—	—

=== 73 kg ===
Rank	Athlete	Group	Snatch (kg)				Clean & Jerk (kg)				Total
Rank	Athlete	Group	1	2	3	Rank	1	2	3	Rank	Total
1st place, gold medalist(s)	Caden Cahoy (USA)	A	140	~~144~~	146	4	~~180~~	180	~~186~~	1st place, gold medalist(s)	326
2nd place, silver medalist(s)	Tiberiu Donose (ROU)	A	143	147	149	1st place, gold medalist(s)	165	171	174	2nd place, silver medalist(s)	323
3rd place, bronze medalist(s)	Mohammed Alzintani (LBA)	A	~~142~~	142	146	3rd place, bronze medalist(s)	171	~~178~~	~~178~~	3rd place, bronze medalist(s)	317
4	Khusinboy Matrasulov (UZB)	A	141	145	148	2nd place, silver medalist(s)	~~164~~	167	~~171~~	5	315
5	Mohammed Al-Marzouq (KSA)	A	137	141	144; YWR	5	166	~~174~~	~~174~~	6	310; YWR
6	Kilian Gallart (ESP)	A	~~133~~	133	138	6	~~161~~	~~162~~	162	7	300
7	Reinner Arango (VEN)	A	131	~~138~~	~~139~~	7	160	~~165~~	~~170~~	8	291
8	Lajos Újvári (HUN)	B	130	~~135~~	~~135~~	8	150	154	157	10	287
9	Ryan McDonald (USA)	B	~~125~~	125	~~131~~	10	151	157	~~162~~	9	282
10	Louis Durocher (CAN)	B	115	~~119~~	~~119~~	12	145	150	155	11	270
11	Rafael Candeias (POR)	B	~~120~~	~~120~~	120	11	145	~~150~~	~~151~~	13	265
12	Nolan Gallart (ESP)	B	110	115	~~120~~	13	138	143	~~148~~	14	258
13	Hasan Ahmed (BHR)	B	105	110	~~116~~	14	135	140	146	12	256
14	Rodrigo Candeias (POR)	B	~~100~~	100	105	15	~~130~~	130	~~135~~	15	235
—	Kim Jung-min (KOR)	A	125	130	~~135~~	9	~~176~~	~~176~~	~~179~~	—	—
—	Franchesco Elizalde (PER)	B	~~125~~	--	--	—	--	--	--	—	—
—	Martin Poghosyan (ARM)	A	~~140~~	~~140~~	~~142~~	—	170	~~175~~	~~175~~	4	—

=== 81 kg ===
Rank	Athlete	Group	Snatch (kg)				Clean & Jerk (kg)				Total
Rank	Athlete	Group	1	2	3	Rank	1	2	3	Rank	Total
1st place, gold medalist(s)	Kwon Dae-hee (KOR)	A	148	153	156	2nd place, silver medalist(s)	190	196	200	1st place, gold medalist(s)	356
2nd place, silver medalist(s)	Mohamed Abdelrahman (EGY)	A	153	157	161	1st place, gold medalist(s)	184	189	~~191~~	3rd place, bronze medalist(s)	350
3rd place, bronze medalist(s)	Yerasyl Saulebekov (KAZ)	A	145	150	154	4	185	~~190~~	190	2nd place, silver medalist(s)	344
4	Goga Jajvani (GEO)	A	150	155	~~158~~	3rd place, bronze medalist(s)	180	~~185~~	186	7	341
5	Narek Mkrtchyan (ARM)	A	140	146	149	9	184	188	~~191~~	4	337
6	Levan Ochigava (GEO)	A	~~145~~	145	149	8	180	186	~~190~~	6	335
7	Khayitboy Abdushukurov (UZB)	A	145	149	~~152~~	7	~~184~~	184	~~190~~	8	333
8	Abdulaziz Alimajanov (UZB)	A	141	146	~~150~~	12	~~185~~	187	~~191~~	5	333
9	Ravin Almammadov (AZE)	A	140	~~145~~	145	13	181	~~188~~	~~189~~	10	326
10	Rakuei Azuma (JPN)	A	144	~~149~~	~~150~~	14	182	~~190~~	~~190~~	9	326
11	Mihaita Tanasoiu (ROU)	B	~~141~~	141	147	10	170	175	~~181~~	12	322
12	Worrapot Nasuriwong (THA)	B	138	~~142~~	142	15	180	~~185~~	~~185~~	11	322
13	Ángel Rodríguez (VEN)	B	143	147	151	5	~~170~~	~~170~~	170	15	321
14	Hutton Boles (USA)	B	140	145	150	6	168	~~174~~	~~176~~	16	318
15	Zakaria Naas (USA)	B	136	141	~~146~~	16	165	~~170~~	170	14	311
16	Ramiro Olivera (ARG)	B	115	120	125	20	163	170	~~180~~	13	295
17	Frank Marmanillo (PER)	C	125	129	~~131~~	18	150	154	160	17	289
18	Jorge Medina (PAN)	B	125	130	~~133~~	17	~~150~~	150	~~156~~	20	280
19	Jonas Klinger (AUT)	C	121	126	~~130~~	19	144	148	151	18	277
20	Cristian de León (MEX)	B	~~122~~	~~122~~	122	22	150	~~155~~	~~155~~	19	272
21	Miguel Muñoz (ESP)	C	~~120~~	120	123	21	140	144	~~146~~	23	267
22	Rylee Borg (MLT)	C	~~113~~	113	116	23	142	~~147~~	147	21	263
23	Zak Taggart (IRL)	C	108	~~112~~	~~112~~	24	133	138	145	22	253
—	Yousef Almedarham (KSA)	B	142	146	~~151~~	11	~~170~~	~~170~~	~~170~~	—	—
—	Tadhg Joyce (IRL)	C	--	--	--	—	--	--	--	—	—

=== 89 kg ===
Rank	Athlete	Group	Snatch (kg)				Clean & Jerk (kg)				Total
Rank	Athlete	Group	1	2	3	Rank	1	2	3	Rank	Total
1st place, gold medalist(s)	Yedige Yemberdi (KAZ)	A	145	150	153	5	187	194	199	1st place, gold medalist(s)	352
2nd place, silver medalist(s)	Alireza Abbaspour (IRI)	A	~~156~~	156	~~161~~	3rd place, bronze medalist(s)	186	190	195	2nd place, silver medalist(s)	351
3rd place, bronze medalist(s)	Jokser Albornoz (COL)	A	~~154~~	154	158	2nd place, silver medalist(s)	183	187	192	3rd place, bronze medalist(s)	350
4	Diyorbek Ermatov (UZB)	A	155	159	162	1st place, gold medalist(s)	186	~~191~~	~~191~~	5	348
5	Kerem Kurnaz (TUR)	A	142	146	149	7	~~185~~	185	~~188~~	6	334
6	Edinson Calero (COL)	A	143	~~148~~	~~148~~	12	177	186	191	4	334
7	Patryk Baranski (POL)	A	146	~~150~~	152	6	~~175~~	175	180	10	332
8	Michał Jaworski (POL)	B	139	143	146	10	171	176	180	8	326
9	Gamal Ahmed (EGY)	A	148	154	~~159~~	4	~~172~~	~~172~~	172	14	326
10	Elias Simbuerger (AUT)	A	~~138~~	138	~~143~~	15	175	181	185	7	323
11	Nurlan Mammadzada (AZE)	A	~~142~~	142	~~145~~	13	~~175~~	175	180	9	322
12	Hussain Al Duhaylib (KSA)	B	136	142	145	11	166	173	~~177~~	12	318
13	Nicu Vîlcu (ROU)	A	140	147	~~154~~	8	170	~~176~~	~~176~~	16	317
14	Bruno Soto (ESP)	B	135	140	~~143~~	14	~~175~~	175	~~182~~	11	316
15	Mohamed Messaour (ALG)	B	138	143	146	9	166	~~172~~	~~173~~	19	312
16	Ihann Barreras (MEX)	B	~~135~~	~~135~~	135	17	172	~~180~~	~~182~~	13	307
17	Kyle Martin Jr. (USA)	B	136	~~142~~	~~142~~	16	166	~~170~~	~~170~~	18	302
18	Luis Alpuche (MEX)	B	125	~~130~~	130	18	162	170	~~174~~	15	300
19	Luca Modrey (AUT)	B	120	125	128	19	160	165	168	17	296
20	Nashmi Alkhaledi (KUW)	B	70	75	80	20	~~95~~	95	100	20	180

=== 96 kg ===
Rank	Athlete	Group	Snatch (kg)				Clean & Jerk (kg)				Total
Rank	Athlete	Group	1	2	3	Rank	1	2	3	Rank	Total
1st place, gold medalist(s)	Masashi Nishikawa (JPN)	A	165	171	~~175~~	1st place, gold medalist(s)	190	195	~~206~~	3rd place, bronze medalist(s)	366
2nd place, silver medalist(s)	Ihnatsi Pauliukavets (AIN)	A	160	164	~~166~~	2nd place, silver medalist(s)	188	193	196	2nd place, silver medalist(s)	360
3rd place, bronze medalist(s)	Sergio Muñoz (COL)	A	152	157	~~161~~	6	194	198	~~205~~	1st place, gold medalist(s)	355
4	Enes Çelik (TUR)	A	~~155~~	156	161	4	187	192	~~195~~	4	353
5	Kofsha Ertjan (ALB)	A	156	161	~~163~~	3rd place, bronze medalist(s)	191	~~195~~	~~197~~	5	352
6	Mohamed Elsayed (EGY)	A	154	160	~~163~~	5	~~187~~	191	~~195~~	6	351
7	Timothy Davis Jr. (USA)	B	145	150	~~158~~	7	188	~~195~~	~~195~~	7	338
8	Tornike Lomtadze (GEO)	A	145	~~148~~	150	9	187	~~192~~	~~192~~	9	337
9	Darius Tataru (ROU)	A	134	140	144	12	185	~~191~~	~~195~~	10	329
10	Eki Lizaso (ESP)	B	~~142~~	142	147	10	173	178	181	11	328
11	Noah Milford (AUS)	B	134	138	~~142~~	15	178	~~184~~	188	8	326
12	Cha Byung-jun (KOR)	B	~~150~~	150	~~160~~	8	175	~~183~~	~~183~~	13	325
13	George Upmeyer (USA)	B	145	~~150~~	~~151~~	11	175	~~181~~	~~181~~	14	320
14	Matvey Makrushin (KAZ)	B	135	140	~~145~~	14	160	165	171	15	311
15	Husain Husain (BHN)	B	135	~~140~~	~~140~~	16	170	176	~~179~~	12	311
16	Konsta Suoniemi (FIN)	B	135	140	~~145~~	13	~~170~~	~~170~~	170	16	310

=== 102 kg ===
Rank	Athlete	Group	Snatch (kg)				Clean & Jerk (kg)				Total
Rank	Athlete	Group	1	2	3	Rank	1	2	3	Rank	Total
1st place, gold medalist(s)	Şahzadbek Matýakubow (TKM)	A	170	175	~~180~~	1st place, gold medalist(s)	205	210	216 JWR	1st place, gold medalist(s)	391
2nd place, silver medalist(s)	Matheus Pessanha (BRA)	A	160	166	168	3rd place, bronze medalist(s)	200	210	215	2nd place, silver medalist(s)	383
3rd place, bronze medalist(s)	Mahmoud Hassan (EGY)	A	160	166	169	2nd place, silver medalist(s)	200	~~211~~	~~212~~	3rd place, bronze medalist(s)	369
4	Yemialyan Maskaleu (AIN)	A	158	165	167	4	~~185~~	185	~~195~~	4	352
5	Mohammad Esfandiari (IRI)	A	~~152~~	152	162	5	181	~~191~~	~~191~~	6	343
6	Marcin Ziolkowski (POL)	A	144	149	151	6	~~175~~	175	~~184~~	10	326
7	Temirlan Okashev (KAZ)	B	135	140	~~144~~	11	~~175~~	175	183	5	323
8	Neilas Gineikis (LTU)	A	145	150	~~155~~	7	172	~~177~~	~~177~~	11	322
9	Danil Betekhtin (KAZ)	A	136	~~141~~	141	10	~~171~~	171	180	7	321
10	Lin Jui-li (TPE)	A	135	140	145	8	170	175	~~180~~	9	320
11	Kacper Dziamski (POL)	A	134	138	~~141~~	13	170	175	178	8	316
12	Jaxon Severo (CAN)	A	135	140	~~145~~	12	~~171~~	171	~~178~~	12	311
13	David Kolar (CZE)	A	134	138	141	9	~~168~~	168	~~172~~	13	309

=== 109 kg ===
Rank	Athlete	Group	Snatch (kg)				Clean & Jerk (kg)				Total
Rank	Athlete	Group	1	2	3	Rank	1	2	3	Rank	Total
1st place, gold medalist(s)	Uladzislau Sakovich (AIN)	A	165	~~170~~	170	1st place, gold medalist(s)	195	201	204	1st place, gold medalist(s)	374
2nd place, silver medalist(s)	Muhammed Burun (TUR)	A	160	164	168	2nd place, silver medalist(s)	198	~~204~~	~~207~~	4	366
3rd place, bronze medalist(s)	Gurami Vekua (GEO)	A	156	159	162	4	195	200	~~205~~	2nd place, silver medalist(s)	362
4	Hassan Emadi (IRI)	A	157	160	163	3rd place, bronze medalist(s)	~~191~~	191	~~201~~	6	354
5	Asem Alsallaj (JOR)	A	148	155	~~158~~	7	192	199	~~204~~	3rd place, bronze medalist(s)	354
6	Daniel Díaz (COL)	A	151	~~157~~	157	6	185	191	~~196~~	5	348
7	Maxim Verivoda (KAZ)	A	140	145	~~150~~	8	170	171	179	7	324
8	Eduardo Galaz (MEX)	A	130	137	142	9	165	172	~~178~~	8	314
9	José García (ESP)	A	130	~~136~~	136	10	155	~~160~~	160	9	296
—	Taner Çağlar (TUR)	A	~~156~~	~~157~~	158	5	~~191~~	~~191~~	--	—	—

=== +109 kg ===
Rank	Athlete	Group	Snatch (kg)				Clean & Jerk (kg)				Total
Rank	Athlete	Group	1	2	3	Rank	1	2	3	Rank	Total
1st place, gold medalist(s)	Nam Ji-yong (KOR)	A	155	160	~~165~~	4	215	223	--	1st place, gold medalist(s)	383
2nd place, silver medalist(s)	Robert Kurouski (AIN)	A	165	170	~~175~~	1st place, gold medalist(s)	201	209	212	2nd place, silver medalist(s)	382
3rd place, bronze medalist(s)	Ashot Movsisyan (ARM)	A	150	155	158	5	200	208	~~210~~	3rd place, bronze medalist(s)	366
4	Szymon Ziółkowski (POL)	A	160	165	170	2nd place, silver medalist(s)	~~186~~	190	195	7	365
5	Irakli Vekua (GEO)	A	152	~~157~~	157	6	190	~~197~~	201	4	358
6	Marek Gugala (POL)	A	150	155	~~158~~	10	190	197	~~202~~	5	352
7	Alonso Bizama (CHI)	A	150	156	~~162~~	8	185	195	~~200~~	6	351
8	Numi Tepulolo (NZL)	A	~~153~~	153	161	3rd place, bronze medalist(s)	182	~~190~~	~~198~~	10	343
9	Jhon Martínez (COL)	A	150	~~156~~	~~157~~	13	~~190~~	190	~~195~~	8	340
10	Amirreza Aghaei (IRI)	B	150	156	~~160~~	7	~~180~~	182	~~187~~	9	338
11	Sanzhar Zholtay (KAZ)	B	142	147	151	12	180	~~188~~	~~188~~	11	331
12	Antonio Cabrera (MEX)	B	150	155	~~160~~	9	171	~~177~~	~~178~~	14	326
13	Cristian Grijalva (MEX)	B	145	151	~~155~~	11	168	175	~~180~~	13	326
14	Adam Friedrich (CZE)	B	138	~~142~~	143	14	171	~~176~~	~~178~~	15	314
15	Isyss Schuster (NZL)	B	~~135~~	135	~~142~~	15	165	175	~~180~~	12	310
—	Kao Jia-hui (TPE)	B	--	--	--	—	~~170~~	~~180~~	~~180~~	—	—

== Women's results ==
=== 45 kg ===
Rank	Athlete	Group	Snatch (kg)				Clean & Jerk (kg)				Total
Rank	Athlete	Group	1	2	3	Rank	1	2	3	Rank	Total
1st place, gold medalist(s)	Angeline Colonia (PHI)	A	70	72	74	1st place, gold medalist(s)	85	87	88	2nd place, silver medalist(s)	162
2nd place, silver medalist(s)	Khemika Kamnoedsri (THA)	A	71	~~73~~	73	2nd place, silver medalist(s)	84	87	~~90~~	3rd place, bronze medalist(s)	160
3rd place, bronze medalist(s)	Ioana Miron (ROU)	A	62	66	~~69~~	6	81	86	88	1st place, gold medalist(s)	154
4	Ezgi Kılıç (TUR)	A	~~70~~	70	~~73~~	3rd place, bronze medalist(s)	82	~~85~~	~~86~~	7	152
5	Lawren Estrada (COL)	A	62	65	68	5	80	84	~~87~~	4	152
6	Payal (IND)	A	65	68	~~70~~	4	82	~~85~~	~~85~~	6	150
7	Yağmur Şahin (TUR)	A	~~65~~	65	~~69~~	7	80	83	~~86~~	5	148
8	Lorena Vásquez (ESP)	A	~~62~~	62	64	8	73	77	~~80~~	8	141
—	Hana Reyes (MEX)	A	~~62~~	~~62~~	~~62~~	—	~~72~~	72	~~76~~	9	—

=== 49 kg ===
Rank	Athlete	Group	Snatch (kg)				Clean & Jerk (kg)				Total
Rank	Athlete	Group	1	2	3	Rank	1	2	3	Rank	Total
1st place, gold medalist(s)	Lovely Inan (PHI)	A	77	79	~~81~~	2nd place, silver medalist(s)	97	100	~~101~~	1st place, gold medalist(s)	179
2nd place, silver medalist(s)	Karoll López (COL)	A	76	78	80	1st place, gold medalist(s)	~~95~~	95	98	2nd place, silver medalist(s)	178
3rd place, bronze medalist(s)	Lucia González (ESP)	B	72	75	~~78~~	4	92	95	~~98~~	5	170
4	Juang Yi-ci (TPE)	A	68	71	73	7	90	96	~~99~~	4	169
5	Rika Morita (JPN)	B	~~68~~	68	71	9	90	93	95	6	166
6	Rose Jean Ramos (PHI)	B	71	~~74~~	74	5	85	88	91	9	165
7	Panchami Sonowal (IND)	B	72	~~75~~	~~75~~	8	93	~~96~~	~~96~~	7	165
8	Katerin Olivera (PER)	B	68	~~71~~	71	10	86	88	~~90~~	10	159
9	Rebeka Groulx (CAN)	B	67	70	~~72~~	11	82	85	~~88~~	12	155
10	Huang Yi-chen (TPE)	A	67	~~70~~	~~70~~	13	~~85~~	85	~~90~~	14	152
11	Kim Lagana (MLT)	B	64	~~67~~	~~67~~	14	84	86	~~88~~	11	150
12	Evelyn Gómez (ESP)	B	68	~~70~~	~~70~~	12	78	81	~~83~~	15	149
13	Tasnim Ben Wada (TUN)	B	58	61	63	15	78	83	85	13	148
14	Miyu Hato (JPN)	B	58	60	~~62~~	16	68	71	74	16	134
—	Oliwia Drzazga (POL)	A	72	74	~~76~~	6	--	--	--	—	—
—	Kerlys Montilla (VEN)	A	~~76~~	76	~~80~~	3rd place, bronze medalist(s)	~~93~~	~~93~~	~~95~~	—	—
—	Naruemol Vonghajak (THA)	A	~~77~~	~~77~~	~~77~~	—	97	~~101~~	~~101~~	3rd place, bronze medalist(s)	—
—	Jeannis Ramírez (MEX)	A	~~74~~	~~74~~	~~75~~	—	93	~~96~~	~~97~~	8	—

=== 55 kg ===
Rank	Athlete	Group	Snatch (kg)				Clean & Jerk (kg)				Total
Rank	Athlete	Group	1	2	3	Rank	1	2	3	Rank	Total
1st place, gold medalist(s)	Chen Guan-ling (TPE)	A	88	93	98 JWR	1st place, gold medalist(s)	112	116	119 JWR	1st place, gold medalist(s)	217 JWR
2nd place, silver medalist(s)	Gelen Torres (COL)	A	83	86	89	2nd place, silver medalist(s)	97	101	103	5	192
3rd place, bronze medalist(s)	Aleksandra Grigoryan (ARM)	A	77	81	~~83~~	7	104	110	~~112~~	2nd place, silver medalist(s)	191
4	Yusa Sato (JPN)	A	~~81~~	81	84	5	103	~~106~~	106	3rd place, bronze medalist(s)	190
5	Jhodie Peralta (PHI)	A	82	85	~~87~~	3rd place, bronze medalist(s)	98	~~102~~	102	7	187
6	Nilam Lamabam (IND)	B	~~80~~	80	84	4	100	~~104~~	~~106~~	8	184
7	Yuliya Katsianiova (AIN)	B	75	79	82	6	95	100	~~103~~	9	182
8	Panadda Haengnamchot (THA)	A	77	~~80~~	~~80~~	11	100	103	~~105~~	4	180
9	Eya Aouadi (TUN)	B	76	~~80~~	~~80~~	12	95	98	102	6	178
10	Koyel Bar (IND)	B	76	~~79~~	~~80~~	13	97	100	~~103~~	11	176
11	Isabella Rodriguez (USA)	B	69	72	75	15	96	100	~~103~~	10	175
12	Bahar Kirat (TUR)	A	75	~~79~~	79	8	95	~~99~~	~~99~~	13	174
13	Estefania Dobre (ROU)	A	73	76	78	10	93	96	~~99~~	12	174
14	Ronja Lenvik (NOR)	B	75	78	~~80~~	9	90	94	~~97~~	14	172
15	Karina Kecskés (HUN)	B	70	74	76	14	90	94	~~97~~	15	170
16	Andrea Uitzil (MEX)	A	75	~~80~~	~~80~~	16	94	~~98~~	~~100~~	16	169
17	Annelien Vandenabeele (BEL)	B	74	~~77~~	~~77~~	17	90	93	~~96~~	18	167
18	Ida Moerck (DEN)	B	~~73~~	73	~~76~~	18	93	~~97~~	~~97~~	17	166
19	Chloe Perkins (AUS)	B	67	70	~~72~~	20	86	89	~~90~~	19	159
—	Medina Domínguez (ESP)	B	70	~~72~~	72	19	~~86~~	~~86~~	~~86~~	—	—
—	Rosalinda Faustino (PHI)	A	~~80~~	~~80~~	~~80~~	—	~~103~~	~~104~~	~~104~~	—	—

=== 59 kg ===
Rank	Athlete	Group	Snatch (kg)				Clean & Jerk (kg)				Total
Rank	Athlete	Group	1	2	3	Rank	1	2	3	Rank	Total
1st place, gold medalist(s)	Miranda Ulrey (USA)	A	93	~~95~~	~~97~~	2nd place, silver medalist(s)	114	117	~~121~~	1st place, gold medalist(s)	210
2nd place, silver medalist(s)	Thanaporn Saetia (THA)	A	92	94	96	1st place, gold medalist(s)	110	~~113~~	113	4	209
3rd place, bronze medalist(s)	Nigora Abdullaeva (UZB)	A	87	90	93	4	110	112	115	2nd place, silver medalist(s)	208
4	María Olalla (ESP)	A	87	90	~~93~~	7	108	~~111~~	113	3rd place, bronze medalist(s)	203
5	Katsiaryna Tsimashenka (AIN)	A	~~90~~	~~90~~	92	5	105	110	~~114~~	7	202
6	Sei Higa (JPN)	A	91	93	~~95~~	3rd place, bronze medalist(s)	105	108	~~110~~	9	201
7	María Hernández Verdin (MEX)	A	~~87~~	87	~~90~~	10	107	111	~~113~~	5	198
8	Júlia Rodrigues (BRA)	A	~~87~~	87	91	6	106	~~110~~	~~111~~	12	197
9	Greta de Riso (ITA)	A	86	~~89~~	~~91~~	11	108	~~111~~	~~114~~	8	194
10	Laura García Rincon (ESP)	B	85	~~87~~	87	9	106	~~108~~	~~108~~	10	193
11	Maëlyn Michel (FRA)	B	84	87	89	8	102	~~105~~	~~106~~	13	191
12	Kailey Papas (USA)	B	80	~~84~~	85	13	100	~~105~~	106	11	191
13	Valeriya Ivanova (KAZ)	B	78	82	~~85~~	14	92	96	99	14	181
14	Lily Strange (AUS)	B	~~75~~	75	~~79~~	15	90	~~92~~	~~92~~	15	165
15	Thorkatla Fridriksdottir (DEN)	B	67	69	71	16	83	~~86~~	~~87~~	16	154
—	Chiu Yu-ling (TPE)	A	83	~~86~~	86	12	~~112~~	~~112~~	~~112~~	—	—
—	Brithany Moncayo (ECU)	B	~~83~~	~~83~~	~~83~~	—	104	107	110	6	—

=== 64 kg ===
Rank	Athlete	Group	Snatch (kg)				Clean & Jerk (kg)				Total
Rank	Athlete	Group	1	2	3	Rank	1	2	3	Rank	Total
1st place, gold medalist(s)	Ingrid Segura (COL)	A	95	99	101	1st place, gold medalist(s)	122	125	130 JAM	1st place, gold medalist(s)	231 JAM
2nd place, silver medalist(s)	Katharine Estep (USA)	A	92	96	100	2nd place, silver medalist(s)	117	122	~~127~~	2nd place, silver medalist(s)	222
3rd place, bronze medalist(s)	Jéssica Palacios (ECU)	A	94	98	~~101~~	3rd place, bronze medalist(s)	120	~~124~~	~~124~~	3rd place, bronze medalist(s)	218
4	Sophia Shaft (USA)	A	94	97	~~101~~	4	~~119~~	120	~~123~~	4	217
5	Claudia Rengifo (VEN)	A	90	93	95	5	~~112~~	112	115	5	210
6	Anca Grosu (ROU)	A	83	85	87	14	107	111	114	6	201
7	Katsiaryna Yakushava (AIN)	A	85	~~90~~	90	8	105	110	~~113~~	8	200
8	Kotone Sakamoto (JPN)	A	90	~~94~~	~~95~~	7	106	110	~~112~~	9	200
9	Tugbanur Koz (TUR)	B	85	89	92	6	100	~~105~~	107	14	199
10	Tenishia Thornton (MLT)	A	85	~~88~~	88	10	~~106~~	106	109	11	197
11	Lavinia Magistris (ITA)	A	84	~~88~~	88	9	102	106	108	13	196
12	Yezda Akar (TUR)	B	~~80~~	80	84	18	105	~~110~~	110	7	194
13	Uxia Romero (ESP)	B	~~83~~	83	87	11	106	~~111~~	~~111~~	15	193
14	Marcella Piovesan (BRA)	B	85	~~90~~	~~90~~	17	102	105	108	12	193
15	Tilde Muhrman (SWE)	B	77	80	83	19	102	105	109	10	192
16	Ghazal Hosseini (IRI)	A	86	~~90~~	~~91~~	16	100	106	~~111~~	16	192
17	Lucía Fandino (ESP)	B	80	83	86	15	100	~~103~~	105	17	191
18	Katelyn Barry (CAN)	B	78	81	~~84~~	20	97	~~101~~	~~101~~	18	178
19	Jheysi Paredes (PER)	B	70	74	77	21	95	~~98~~	~~98~~	19	172
20	Andrada Galvao Pereira (BEL)	B	70	~~75~~	75	22	87	~~91~~	91	21	166
21	Laura Svrčková (SVK)	B	71	~~75~~	~~75~~	23	89	91	~~93~~	20	162
—	Hanin Elsayed (EGY)	A	87	~~90~~	--	12	--	--	--	—	—
—	Martína Giménez (ARG)	A	87	~~90~~	~~91~~	13	~~111~~	~~113~~	~~113~~	—	—

=== 71 kg ===
Rank	Athlete	Group	Snatch (kg)				Clean & Jerk (kg)				Total
Rank	Athlete	Group	1	2	3	Rank	1	2	3	Rank	Total
1st place, gold medalist(s)	Charlotte Simoneau (CAN)	A	105	108	110	1st place, gold medalist(s)	125	128	130	1st place, gold medalist(s)	240
2nd place, silver medalist(s)	Damary Nazareno (ECU)	A	103	106	~~110~~	3rd place, bronze medalist(s)	120	~~124~~	125	3rd place, bronze medalist(s)	231
3rd place, bronze medalist(s)	Anna Ylisoini (FIN)	A	101	104	~~106~~	4	121	124	~~128~~	4	228
4	Monika Marach (POL)	A	100	103	~~105~~	5	120	~~124~~	~~124~~	7	223
5	Phattharathida Wongsing (THA)	A	~~95~~	95	98	7	~~124~~	124	~~127~~	5	222
6	Nicole Caamano (USA)	A	~~97~~	98	~~101~~	6	~~116~~	117	~~120~~	9	215
7	Chen Hsin-ning (TPE)	B	~~88~~	~~88~~	88	15	120	124	126	2nd place, silver medalist(s)	214
8	Fatemeh Keshavarz (IRI)	A	93	~~96~~	~~96~~	12	117	~~123~~	~~124~~	8	210
9	Martyna Dołęga (POL)	A	92	94	~~96~~	10	112	~~115~~	~~116~~	11	206
10	Naomie Lusignan (CAN)	B	88	92	95	9	110	~~115~~	~~117~~	13	205
11	Georgia Theron (NZL)	B	86	89	91	14	110	114	~~116~~	10	205
12	Keily Silva (VEN)	A	92	~~96~~	~~97~~	13	112	~~117~~	~~117~~	12	204
13	Reihaneh Karimi (IRI)	A	~~83~~	~~83~~	83	20	120	~~127~~	~~127~~	6	203
14	Chiang Sin-yueh (TPE)	A	~~90~~	90	94	11	~~107~~	107	~~112~~	16	201
15	Erin Friel (GBR)	B	83	~~85~~	86	16	106	110	~~113~~	14	196
16	Madeline Rosher (GBR)	B	80	83	~~86~~	19	100	104	107	15	190
17	Lina Bauer (AUT)	B	79	82	84	18	99	103	~~106~~	17	187
18	Nya Hayman (AUS)	B	85	~~88~~	~~88~~	17	101	~~105~~	~~105~~	18	186
19	Lena Raidel (AUT)	B	77	80	~~82~~	21	96	~~100~~	~~101~~	21	176
20	Amy Abelleira (ESP)	B	73	~~77~~	77	22	93	98	~~103~~	20	175
21	Mariana Batista (POR)	B	75	~~80~~	~~80~~	23	100	~~104~~	~~105~~	19	175
22	Rita Ferreira (POR)	B	~~64~~	~~64~~	64	24	80	~~84~~	~~84~~	22	144
—	Olivia Selemaia (NZL)	A	~~98~~	~~98~~	98	8	~~118~~	~~120~~	~~120~~	—	—
—	María Mena (COL)	A	102	105	109	2nd place, silver medalist(s)	~~122~~	~~124~~	~~124~~	—	—

=== 76 kg ===
Rank	Athlete	Group	Snatch (kg)				Clean & Jerk (kg)				Total
Rank	Athlete	Group	1	2	3	Rank	1	2	3	Rank	Total
1st place, gold medalist(s)	Ella Nicholson (USA)	A	105	108	113	1st place, gold medalist(s)	125	~~131~~	131	1st place, gold medalist(s)	244
2nd place, silver medalist(s)	Jeon Hee-soo (KOR)	A	100	102	~~106~~	2nd place, silver medalist(s)	125	130	~~134~~	2nd place, silver medalist(s)	232; YWR
3rd place, bronze medalist(s)	Anna Amroyan (ARM)	A	95	98	100	4	123	128	~~133~~	3rd place, bronze medalist(s)	228
4	Alexandrina Ciubotaru (MDA)	B	93	97	99	5	116	121	123	4	222
5	Isabella Brown (GBR)	A	95	99	101	3rd place, bronze medalist(s)	117	121	~~124~~	5	222
6	Medine Balaban (TUR)	A	~~93~~	93	97	7	117	~~121~~	121	6	218
7	Burcu Gerçekden (TUR)	B	92	95	98	6	115	~~118~~	~~120~~	11	213
8	Ivanna Cerquera (COL)	A	85	90	94	9	117	~~122~~	~~123~~	9	211
9	Hanieh Sharifi (IRI)	B	83	87	90	13	111	117	~~119~~	8	207
10	Sanjana (IND)	B	~~86~~	86	90	12	116	~~120~~	~~120~~	10	206
11	Alyssa Ballard (USA)	B	88	~~91~~	~~91~~	14	118	~~121~~	~~122~~	7	206
12	Ángeles Cruz (MEX)	A	92	~~96~~	~~100~~	10	110	~~115~~	~~115~~	13	202
13	Rose Beaudoin (CAN)	B	90	~~94~~	~~94~~	11	110'	~~113~~	~~113~~	12	200
—	Chalida Taingdee (THA)	A	92	~~95~~	95	8	~~114~~	~~114~~	~~114~~	—	—
—	Issys Tobia-Pita (NZL)	B	~~80~~	~~80~~	~~80~~	—	95	~~100~~	~~100~~	14	—

=== 81 kg ===
Rank	Athlete	Group	Snatch (kg)				Clean & Jerk (kg)				Total
Rank	Athlete	Group	1	2	3	Rank	1	2	3	Rank	Total
1st place, gold medalist(s)	Emma Poghosyan (ARM)	A	95	~~100~~	100	5	124	131	133	1st place, gold medalist(s)	233
2nd place, silver medalist(s)	Mairyn Hernández (MEX)	A	96	101	104	1st place, gold medalist(s)	122	126	128	3rd place, bronze medalist(s)	232
3rd place, bronze medalist(s)	Yekta Jamali (WRT)	A	98	101	104	2nd place, silver medalist(s)	121	125	127	6	231
4	Anamjan Rüstamowa (TKM)	A	100	103	~~105~~	3rd place, bronze medalist(s)	123	127	~~130~~	5	230
5	Shams Abdelazim (EGY)	A	98	102	~~105~~	4	122	~~126~~	128	4	230
6	Katelyn Witte (USA)	A	~~94~~	95	~~98~~	8	123	~~127~~	129	2nd place, silver medalist(s)	224
7	Natia Gadelia (GEO)	A	95	99	~~103~~	6	119	~~124~~	~~125~~	9	218
8	Maricela Segura (COL)	B	84	88	91	10	113	117	121	7	212
9	Chun Yoo-been (KOR)	B	90	~~95~~	~~99~~	11	120	~~124~~	~~124~~	8	210
10	Martha Bolanos (ECU)	B	90	93	~~95~~	9	108	112	115	10	208
11	Canan Korçak (TUR)	B	84	~~88~~	90	12	104	109	~~112~~	11	199
12	Heidy Herrera (COL)	B	82	~~88~~	88	13	100	~~107~~	~~107~~	12	188
—	Nigora Suvonova (UZB)	A	~~92~~	92	96	7	~~119~~	~~119~~	~~120~~	—	—

=== 87 kg ===
Rank	Athlete	Group	Snatch (kg)				Clean & Jerk (kg)				Total
Rank	Athlete	Group	1	2	3	Rank	1	2	3	Rank	Total
1st place, gold medalist(s)	Abdelrazek Ahmed (EGY)	A	104	106	110	1st place, gold medalist(s)	124	128	130	1st place, gold medalist(s)	240
2nd place, silver medalist(s)	Büşra Çan (TUR)	A	98	101	104	3rd place, bronze medalist(s)	122	126	129	2nd place, silver medalist(s)	233
3rd place, bronze medalist(s)	Mariam Murgvliani (GEO)	A	98	102	105	2nd place, silver medalist(s)	120	125	~~129~~	4	230
4	Valeria Ruíz (COL)	A	~~99~~	99	103	4	120	~~125~~	126	3rd place, bronze medalist(s)	229
5	Kizhan Maghsoodi (IRI)	A	93	~~97~~	98	5	~~115~~	115	121	5	219
6	Amanda Robles (USA)	A	96	~~99~~	~~100~~	6	114	~~116~~	~~117~~	8	210
7	Tania Hernández (MEX)	A	~~92~~	92	~~96~~	7	117	~~122~~	~~123~~	6	209
8	Estefany Espinoza (MEX)	A	86	90	~~93~~	8	115	~~121~~	~~122~~	7	205
9	Weronika Nowak (POL)	A	88	~~92~~	~~92~~	9	105	110	~~114~~	9	198

=== +87 kg ===
Rank	Athlete	Group	Snatch (kg)				Clean & Jerk (kg)				Total
Rank	Athlete	Group	1	2	3	Rank	1	2	3	Rank	Total
1st place, gold medalist(s)	Marifélix Sarría (CUB)	A	108	111	115	1st place, gold medalist(s)	146	151	155	1st place, gold medalist(s)	270
2nd place, silver medalist(s)	Etta Love (CAN)	A	105	108	~~111~~	5	135	140	146; YWR	2nd place, silver medalist(s)	254
3rd place, bronze medalist(s)	Taiane de Lima (BRA)	A	105	110	~~112~~	2nd place, silver medalist(s)	136	141	--	3rd place, bronze medalist(s)	251
4	Arantzazu Pavez (CHI)	A	100	106	109	4	125	132	137	4	246
5	Yairan Tysforod (COL)	A	105	~~109~~	110	3rd place, bronze medalist(s)	120	130	135	6	245
6	Martina Maibam (IND)	A	97	101	~~104~~	6	131	136	~~139~~	5	237
7	Marketa Vrabcova (CZE)	A	75	81	85	7	90	~~98~~	98	7	183
