= Weightlifting at the 2025 Junior Pan American Games =

Weightlifting at the 2025 Junior American Games
- Venue: SND Stadium
- Start date: August 20, 2025
- End date: August 23, 2025
- No. of events: 12
- Competitors: 93 from 24 nations

The weightlifting events at the 2025 Junior Pan American Games were held from 20 to 23 August 2025 at the SND Stadium, located in the SND Complex in Asunción.

Twelve events were contested, six for men and six for women. The winner of each event qualified for the 2027 Pan American Games in Lima, Peru.

== Qualification ==
A total of 96 athletes qualified for the events. Qualification was based on the results from the 2025 Junior Pan American Championship, held in Havana, Cuba.

== Medal summary ==
=== Medal table ===
* Host nation (Paraguay)

Rank	Nation	Gold	Silver	Bronze	Total
1	Colombia	5	1	0	6
2	Venezuela	3	2	1	6
3	Ecuador	1	1	2	4
4	Brazil	1	0	1	2
4	Cuba	1	0	1	2
6	Canada	1	0	0	1
7	Mexico	0	3	1	4
8	Argentina	0	3	0	3
9	United States	0	2	1	3
10	Chile	0	0	1	1
10	Dominican Republic	0	0	1	1
10	Guatemala	0	0	1	1
10	Paraguay*	0	0	1	1
10	Peru	0	0	1	1
Totals (14 entries)		12	12	12	36

=== Medalists ===
==== Men ====
Event	Gold		Silver		Bronze	
65 kg	José González; Colombia	281 kg	Dionangel Vargas; Venezuela	273 kg	Yuliesky Martínez; Cuba	268 kg
71 kg	David García; Venezuela	280 kg	Leonardo Torres; Mexico	274 kg	Benjamín Riquelme; Chile	270 kg
79 kg	Emanuel de la Rosa; Cuba	310 kg	Diego Turner; Argentina	290 kg	Hidver Silva; Peru	261 kg
88 kg	Ángel Rodríguez; Venezuela	353 kg JAR	Hainner Córdoba; Colombia	343 kg	Ryan McDonald; United States	328 kg
98 kg	Matheus Pessanha; Brazil	380 kg JAR	Vicente Braulio; Ecuador	320 kg	Derisson Almazán; Guatemala	295 kg
+98 kg	Jhon Martínez; Colombia	357 kg JAR	Joaquín Mesa; Argentina	356 kg	Cristhian Izaías; Brazil	356 kg

==== Women ====
Event	Gold		Silver		Bronze	
53 kg	Kerlys Montilla; Venezuela	183 kg	Jade Morales; United States	173 kg	Violeta Fernández; Paraguay	172 kg
58 kg	Gelen Torres; Colombia	213 kg JAR	María Hernández; Mexico	189 kg	Brittany Moncayo; Ecuador	186 kg
63 kg	Jessica Palacios; Ecuador	222 kg JAR	María Paz Casadevall; Argentina	211 kg	Diana Bellorin; Venezuela	208 kg
69 kg	Charlotte Simoneau; Canada	240 kg JAR	Claudia Rengifo; Venezuela	220 kg	Damary Bravo; Ecuador	215 kg
77 kg	María Mena; Colombia	246 kg JAR	Ella Nicholson; United States	245 kg	Camila Cervantes; Mexico	219 kg
+77 kg	Yairan Tysforod; Colombia	248 kg	Mairyn Hernández; Mexico	236 kg	Perqui Francis; Dominican Republic	220 kg

== Results ==
=== Men's events ===
==== 65 kg ====
Date: August 20

Rank	Athlete	Nation	Group	Snatch (kg)				Clean & Jerk (kg)				Total
Rank	Athlete	Nation	Group	1	2	3	Result	1	2	3	Result	Total
1st place, gold medalist(s)	José González	Colombia	A	127	~~130~~	130	130	146	151	~~160~~	151	281
2nd place, silver medalist(s)	Dionangel Vargas	Venezuela	A	120	123	~~126~~	123	145	150	~~154~~	150	273
3rd place, bronze medalist(s)	Yuliesky Martínez	Cuba	A	110	115	120	120	141	145	148	148	268
4	Darwin Vera	Ecuador	A	115	~~119~~	~~119~~	115	145	~~150~~	~~154~~	145	260
5	Benjamín Aranis	Chile	A	114	117	~~119~~	117	140	~~145~~	~~145~~	140	257
6	Domingo Meza	Argentina	A	~~106~~	106	110	110	140	~~145~~	~~148~~	140	250
7	Bruno Hortiguera	Uruguay	A	105	~~109~~	~~110~~	105	125	~~129~~	129	129	234
8	Francisco Sánchez	Paraguay	A	100	~~105~~	~~105~~	100	120	126	~~135~~	126	226
9	Jasier Ayuso	Puerto Rico	A	90	~~95~~	95	95	118	123	~~128~~	123	218

==== 71 kg ====
Date: August 20

Rank	Athlete	Nation	Group	Snatch (kg)				Clean & Jerk (kg)				Total
Rank	Athlete	Nation	Group	1	2	3	Result	1	2	3	Result	Total
1st place, gold medalist(s)	David García	Venezuela	A	119	123	125	125	150	155	~~160~~	155	280
2nd place, silver medalist(s)	Leonardo Torres	Mexico	A	117	120	124	124	~~150~~	150	~~157~~	150	274
3rd place, bronze medalist(s)	Benjamín Riquelme	Chile	A	114	118	120	120	141	145	150	150	270
4	Kyle Bogado	Paraguay	A	115	~~118~~	118	118	145	148	~~153~~	148	266
5	Thomas Pilotte	Canada	A	~~114~~	114	~~118~~	114	145	150	~~157~~	150	264
6	Jimmy de Paz	El Salvador	A	103	107	~~110~~	107	125	~~130~~	~~130~~	125	232
7	Michael Inuma	Peru	A	90	93	~~96~~	93	120	124	~~128~~	124	217
8	Enmanuel Pascual	Dominican Republic	A	~~84~~	84	~~87~~	84	103	108	113	113	197

==== 79 kg ====
Date: August 21

Rank	Athlete	Nation	Group	Snatch (kg)				Clean & Jerk (kg)				Total
Rank	Athlete	Nation	Group	1	2	3	Result	1	2	3	Result	Total
1st place, gold medalist(s)	Emanuel de la Rosa	Cuba	A	130	135	140	140	160	170	~~180~~	170	310
2nd place, silver medalist(s)	Diego Turner	Argentina	A	121	126	130	130	147	154	160	160	290
3rd place, bronze medalist(s)	Hidver Silva	Peru	A	112	~~115~~	~~115~~	112	145	149	~~152~~	149	261
4	Sebastián Justiniano	Bolivia	A	115	120	~~123~~	120	~~140~~	~~140~~	140	140	260
5	Giovanny Ayala	Puerto Rico	A	110	114	~~117~~	114	140	145	~~149~~	145	259
6	Axel Jovel	El Salvador	A	100	103	106	106	120	~~125~~	~~125~~	120	226
7	Ky-mani Joseph	Guyana	A	~~53~~	53	60	60	60	~~68~~	70	70	130

==== 88 kg ====
Date: August 21

Rank	Athlete	Nation	Group	Snatch (kg)				Clean & Jerk (kg)				Total
Rank	Athlete	Nation	Group	1	2	3	Result	1	2	3	Result	Total
1st place, gold medalist(s)	Ángel Rodríguez	Venezuela	A	155	~~161~~	161	161	188	192	~~200~~	192	353
2nd place, silver medalist(s)	Hainner Córdoba	Colombia	A	150	155	~~161~~	155	180	188	~~195~~	188	343
3rd place, bronze medalist(s)	Ryan McDonald	United States	A	142	146	~~149~~	146	177	182	~~190~~	182	328
4	Elkin Ramírez	Ecuador	A	130	~~136~~	137	137	173	178	184	184	321
5	Angel Castellano	Mexico	A	~~143~~	143	~~147~~	143	~~175~~	177	~~186~~	177	320
6	Felipe Dias	Brazil	A	~~137~~	137	140	140	165	~~172~~	173	173	313
7	Dryden Parchewsky	Canada	A	128	131	134	134	150	155	~~160~~	155	289
8	Alejandro Duarte	Paraguay	A	~~115~~	115	~~120~~	115	135	140	~~145~~	140	255

==== 98 kg ====
Date: August 22

Rank	Athlete	Nation	Group	Snatch (kg)				Clean & Jerk (kg)				Total
Rank	Athlete	Nation	Group	1	2	3	Result	1	2	3	Result	Total
1st place, gold medalist(s)	Matheus Pessanha	Brazil	A	155	162	168	168	190	200	212	212	380
2nd place, silver medalist(s)	Vicente Braulio	Ecuador	A	150	~~153~~	–	150	170	–	–	170	320
3rd place, bronze medalist(s)	Derisson Almazán	Guatemala	A	125	130	135	135	150	160	~~165~~	160	295
4	Hector López	Peru	A	105	~~110~~	~~110~~	105	139	144	146	146	251
5	Jonathan Villalonga	Cuba	A	105	~~110~~	111	111	132	137	~~141~~	137	248
6	Gustavo Suarez	Bolivia	A	100	~~110~~	110	110	125	130	135	135	245
7	Alex Morel	Paraguay	A	103	~~108~~	~~108~~	103	125	130	135	135	238
8	Jack Pipe	Barbados	A	55	60	~~65~~	60	72	75	~~80~~	75	135

==== +98 kg ====
Date: August 23

Rank	Athlete	Nation	Group	Snatch (kg)				Clean & Jerk (kg)				Total
Rank	Athlete	Nation	Group	1	2	3	Result	1	2	3	Result	Total
1st place, gold medalist(s)	Jhon Martínez	Colombia	A	150	~~155~~	155	155	~~190~~	190	202	202	357
2nd place, silver medalist(s)	Joaquín Mesa	Argentina	A	155	160	165	165	180	187	191	191	356
3rd place, bronze medalist(s)	Cristhian Izaías	Brazil	A	150	155	~~160~~	155	185	192	201	201	356
4	Jorge Alberto Posada	Mexico	A	~~145~~	145	150	150	185	191	~~196~~	191	341
5	Luis Manuel Florentino	Dominican Republic	A	110	117	122	122	137	145	150	150	272
6	Enrique Sandoval	Guatemala	A	115	120	~~125~~	120	145	150	~~153~~	150	270
7	Miguel Angel Marin	Belize	A	62	65	66	66	95	~~100~~	~~100~~	95	161

=== Women's events ===
==== 53 kg ====
Date: August 20

Rank	Athlete	Nation	Group	Snatch (kg)				Clean & Jerk (kg)				Total
Rank	Athlete	Nation	Group	1	2	3	Result	1	2	3	Result	Total
1st place, gold medalist(s)	Kerlys Montilla	Venezuela	A	75	78	81	81	95	98	102	102	183
2nd place, silver medalist(s)	Jade Morales	United States	A	72	75	~~77~~	75	95	~~98~~	98	98	173
3rd place, bronze medalist(s)	Violeta Fernández	Paraguay	A	73	75	77	77	88	91	95	95	172
4	Katerin Olivera	Peru	A	~~74~~	74	~~76~~	74	90	~~95~~	~~97~~	90	164
5	Thalia Castillo	Cuba	A	~~63~~	63	66	66	~~85~~	~~85~~	85	85	151
6	Jhancelis Santana	Dominican Republic	A	62	65	~~68~~	65	82	86	~~88~~	86	151
7	July Mendoza	El Salvador	A	60	63	~~65~~	63	78	82	~~85~~	82	145
8	Dulce Anahí Aquino	Guatemala	A	~~60~~	60	~~63~~	60	68	72	~~75~~	72	132

==== 58 kg ====
Date: August 20

Rank	Athlete	Nation	Group	Snatch (kg)				Clean & Jerk (kg)				Total
Rank	Athlete	Nation	Group	1	2	3	Result	1	2	3	Result	Total
1st place, gold medalist(s)	Gelen Torres	Colombia	A	90	95	98	98	110	115	~~116~~	115	213
2nd place, silver medalist(s)	María Hernández	Mexico	A	~~81~~	81	84	84	100	105	~~107~~	105	189
3rd place, bronze medalist(s)	Brittany Moncayo	Ecuador	A	80	~~83~~	~~85~~	80	101	106	~~110~~	106	186
4	Giovanna Tavares	Brazil	A	~~77~~	~~77~~	77	77	90	95	~~100~~	95	172
5	Natalia Morera	Costa Rica	A	70	74	78	78	90	~~95~~	~~95~~	90	168
6	Angeles Ibañez	Paraguay	A	63	66	~~68~~	66	82	86	90	90	156
7	Carolina Roman	Uruguay	A	61	64	67	67	80	84	~~87~~	84	151
	Eloisa Vasquez	Bolivia	A	~~60~~	~~60~~	~~60~~	–	–	–	–	–	DNF

==== 63 kg ====
Date: August 21

Rank	Athlete	Nation	Group	Snatch (kg)				Clean & Jerk (kg)				Total
Rank	Athlete	Nation	Group	1	2	3	Result	1	2	3	Result	Total
1st place, gold medalist(s)	Jessica Palacios	Ecuador	A	93	97	100	100	117	122	~~126~~	122	222
2nd place, silver medalist(s)	María Paz Casadevall	Argentina	A	88	91	~~93~~	91	114	118	120	120	211
3rd place, bronze medalist(s)	Diana Bellorin	Venezuela	A	89	92	~~95~~	92	112	116	~~118~~	116	208
4	Lisney Adames	Cuba	A	83	~~86~~	~~86~~	83	105	~~109~~	~~109~~	105	188
5	Bianca Arias	Chile	A	75	~~83~~	~~83~~	75	97	~~102~~	102	102	177
6	Anali Capia	Bolivia	A	~~61~~	61	~~64~~	61	80	85	89	89	150
7	Daniela Flores	Honduras	A	40	43	45	45	50	~~55~~	55	55	100

==== 69 kg ====
Date: August 22

Rank	Athlete	Nation	Group	Snatch (kg)				Clean & Jerk (kg)				Total
Rank	Athlete	Nation	Group	1	2	3	Result	1	2	3	Result	Total
1st place, gold medalist(s)	Charlotte Simoneau	Canada	A	~~105~~	105	110	110	125	130	~~134~~	130	240
2nd place, silver medalist(s)	Claudia Rengifo	Venezuela	A	97	~~100~~	100	100	116	120	~~125~~	120	220
3rd place, bronze medalist(s)	Damary Bravo	Ecuador	A	94	97	100	100	115	~~119~~	~~121~~	115	215
4	Stephany Assis	Brazil	A	90	95	98	98	~~113~~	~~114~~	115	115	213
5	Nicole Caamano	United States	A	92	~~94~~	~~95~~	92	110	~~114~~	~~115~~	110	202
6	Erdilianys Chamizo	Cuba	A	80	~~83~~	83	83	100	105	110	110	193
7	Jheysi Paredes	Peru	A	75	79	82	82	103	107	~~110~~	107	189
8	Kelly Aparicio	Panama	A	78	81	~~83~~	81	~~100~~	100	~~104~~	100	181

==== 77 kg ====
Date: August 22

Rank	Athlete	Nation	Group	Snatch (kg)				Clean & Jerk (kg)				Total
Rank	Athlete	Nation	Group	1	2	3	Result	1	2	3	Result	Total
1st place, gold medalist(s)	María Mena	Colombia	A	105	~~110~~	110	110	125	131	136	136	246
2nd place, silver medalist(s)	Ella Nicholson	United States	A	105	110	114	114	126	131	~~136~~	131	245
3rd place, bronze medalist(s)	Camila Cervantes	Mexico	A	90	93	96	96	117	121	123	123	219
4	Milena Ayala	Argentina	A	90	93	96	96	112	118	122	122	218
5	Beverly de León	Guatemala	A	~~83~~	83	~~87~~	83	103	107	~~111~~	107	190
	Rose Beaudoin	Canada	A	~~96~~	~~96~~	~~97~~	–	–	–	–	–	DNF

==== +77 kg ====
Date: August 23

Rank	Athlete	Nation	Group	Snatch (kg)				Clean & Jerk (kg)				Total
Rank	Athlete	Nation	Group	1	2	3	Result	1	2	3	Result	Total
1st place, gold medalist(s)	Yairan Tysforod	Colombia	A	108	113	~~117~~	113	130	135	~~141~~	135	248
2nd place, silver medalist(s)	Mairyn Hernández	Mexico	A	100	~~106~~	106	106	125	130	~~136~~	130	236
3rd place, bronze medalist(s)	Perqui Francis	Dominican Republic	A	~~90~~	92	97	97	114	117	123	123	220
4	Maria Gilda Travesani	Argentina	A	91	94	96	96	109	113	116	116	212
5	Laila Grimaldi	Brazil	A	~~95~~	~~95~~	95	95	~~108~~	108	112	112	207
6	Victoria Barrientos	Chile	A	76	80	~~84~~	80	97	102	107	107	187
7	Keren Guerrero	El Salvador	A	72	75	~~77~~	75	90	~~93~~	~~94~~	90	165
8	Mia Sophia Colon	Puerto Rico	A	65	70	75	75	~~75~~	75	80	80	155
