= Weightlifting at the 2026 Commonwealth Games – Women's 69 kg =

Weightlifting – Women's 69 kg at the 2026 Commonwealth Games
- Venue: Scottish Event Campus
- Dates: 28 July 2026
- Competitors: 11 from 11 nations

Medalists
| gold medal | Charlotte Simoneau | Canada |
| silver medal | Harjinder Kaur | India |
| bronze medal | Nya Hayman | Australia |

The Women's 69 kg weightlifting event at the 2026 Commonwealth Games took place at the SEC Armadillo, Glasgow on 28 July 2026. Canada's Charlotte Simoneau won the gold medal ahead of Harjinder Kaur from India who took silver with Nya Hayman of Australia claiming the bronze.

== Qualification ==
A total of 176 weightlifters (88 per gender) qualify to compete at the Games. Nations may earn one quota per weight class, allocated as follows:

- Automatic Qualification – Host CGA (1 per event)
- Direct Qualification – 2025 Commonwealth Weightlifting Champions (1 per event)
- IWF Commonwealth Ranking List (Ranking Period: 01 June 2025 – 18 May 2026) (8 per event)
- Bipartite Invitation (1 per event)

The following lifters qualified in the Women's 69 kg class:

| Means of qualification | Quotas | Qualified |
|---|---|---|
| Host Nation | 1 | Madelaine Rosher (SCO) |
| 2025 Commonwealth Championships | ~~1~~ | ~~Islamiyat Yusuf (NGR)~~ |
| IWF Commonwealth Rankings | 8 | Charlotte Simoneau (CAN); Harjinder Kaur (IND); Erin Barton (ENG); Nya Hayman (AUS); Tenishia Thornton (MLT); Ketty Lent (MRI); Laryne Jefferies (RSA); Chloe Hood (WAL) |
| Bipartite Invitation | 1 | Holly O'Shea (GIB) |
| Reallocation | 1 | Olivia Selemaia (NZL) |
| TOTAL | 11 | |

== Schedule ==
All times are British Summer Time (UTC+1)

| Date | Time | Round |
|---|---|---|
| 28 July 2026 | 18:30 | Final |

== Competition ==
| Rank | Athlete | Body weight (kg) | Snatch (kg) | | | | Clean & Jerk (kg) | | | | Total |
| Rank | Athlete | Body weight (kg) | 1 | 2 | 3 | Result | 1 | 2 | 3 | Result | Total |
|---|---|---|---|---|---|---|---|---|---|---|---|
| 1st place, gold medalist(s) | Charlotte Simoneau (CAN) | | 104 | 108 | ~~111~~ | 108 GR | 127 | 132 | ~~135~~ | 132 CR, GR | 240 GR |
| 2nd place, silver medalist(s) | Harjinder Kaur (IND) | | 96 | 99 | 101 | 101 | 120 | 123 | 126 | 126 | 227 |
| 3rd place, bronze medalist(s) | Nya Hayman (AUS) | | 97 | ~~100~~ | ~~100~~ | 97 | 118 | 121 | ~~124~~ | 121 | 218 |
| 4 | Ketty Lent (MRI) | | 92 | 95 | 97 | 97 | 115 | 120 | ~~123~~ | 120 | 217 |
| 5 | Madelaine Rosher (SCO) | | ~~97~~ | ~~97~~ | 97 | 97 | 117 | ~~120~~ | ~~120~~ | 117 | 214 |
| 6 | Erin Barton (ENG) | | ~~91~~ | 91 | ~~95~~ | 91 | 119 | ~~124~~ | ~~128~~ | 119 | 210 |
| 7 | Tenishia Thornton (MLT) | | 90 | ~~93~~ | 93 | 93 | 114 | ~~117~~ | ~~117~~ | 114 | 207 |
| 8 | Laryne Jefferies (RSA) | | 90 | ~~93~~ | ~~93~~ | 90 | ~~106~~ | 106 | ~~111~~ | 106 | 196 |
| 9 | Chloe Hood (WAL) | | 75 | 80 | 85 | 85 | 100 | 105 | ~~109~~ | 105 | 190 |
| 10 | Holly O'Shea (GIB) | | 74 | 77 | 80 | 80 | 93 | 96 | 100 | 100 | 180 |
| — | Olivia Selemaia (NZL) | | ~~100~~ | ~~100~~ | ~~100~~ | — | — | — | — | — | — |
