= Charlotte Simoneau =

Canadian weightlifter (born 2005)

Personal information
- Born: May 30, 2005 (age 21)

Sport
- Country: Canada
- Sport: Weightlifting
- Weight class: 69 kg
Medal record
Women's weightlifting
Representing Canada
Commonwealth Games
Gold medal – first place	2026 Glasgow	69 kg
World Junior Championships
Gold medal – first place	2024 León	71 kg
Gold medal – first place	2025 Lima	71 kg
Silver medal – second place	2023 Guadalajara	64 kg
Pan American Championships
Silver medal – second place	2024 Caracas	64 kg
Junior Pan American Games
Gold medal – first place	2025 Asunción	69 kg

Charlotte Simoneau (born May 30, 2005) is a Canadian weightlifter. She is a two-time Junior World Champion. She won a gold medal at the 2026 Commonwealth Games and set a new Commonwealth Games record in the snatch, clean and jerk, and total categories in the 69 kg weight class.

== Career ==
Simoneau competed at the Junior World Weightlifting Championships in 2023 and won a silver medal in the 64 kg event. She again competed at the World Junior Championships in 2024 and won a gold medal in the 71 kg event. She became the first Canadian to win gold at the Junior World Championships. She repeated as champion in 2025.

In August 2025, she competed at the 2025 Junior Pan American Games and won a gold medal in the 69 kg event with a Panamerican junior record of 240 kg. She also set a junior world record of 110 kg in the snatch. She then served as the flag bearer for the closing ceremony. With her win, she qualified for the 2027 Pan American Games.

In July 2026, she competed at the 2026 Commonwealth Games and won a gold medal in the 69 kg event. She opened the event with 108 kg in the snatch to set a new Commonwealth Games record. She followed it up with 132 kg in the clean and jerk, another Games record, before finishing with a total lift of 240 kg, also a new Games record.
