= 2025 World Weightlifting Championships – Women's 77 kg =

Women's 77 kg at the 2025 World Weightlifting Championships
- Venue: Førdehuset
- Location: Førde, Norway
- Dates: 8 October
- Winning total: 278 kg CWR

Medalists
gold medal	Olivia Reeves	United States
silver medal	Sara Ahmed	Egypt
bronze medal	Mari Sánchez	Colombia

The women's 77 kilograms competition at the 2025 World Weightlifting Championships was held on 8 October 2025.

== Schedule ==
Date	Time	Event
8 October 2025	11:30	Group C
8 October 2025	17:00	Group B
8 October 2025	19:30	Group A

== Records ==
Prior to this competition, the existing world records were as follows.

World record	Snatch	World Standard	122 kg	—	1 June 2025
World record	Clean & Jerk	World Standard	154 kg	—	1 June 2025
World record	Total	World Standard	274 kg	—	1 June 2025

== Results ==
Rank	Athlete	Group	Snatch (kg)				Clean & Jerk (kg)				Total
Rank	Athlete	Group	1	2	3	Rank	1	2	3	Rank	Total
1st place, gold medalist(s)	Olivia Reeves (USA)	A	114	119	123 CWR	1st place, gold medalist(s)	~~146~~	146	155 CWR	1st place, gold medalist(s)	278 CWR
2nd place, silver medalist(s)	Sara Ahmed (EGY)	A	110	112	~~115~~	2nd place, silver medalist(s)	140	~~147~~	~~150~~	2nd place, silver medalist(s)	252
3rd place, bronze medalist(s)	Mari Sánchez (COL)	A	106	110	112	3rd place, bronze medalist(s)	132	~~136~~	136	5	248
4	Mattie Rogers (USA)	A	107	~~110~~	~~111~~	7	135	~~140~~	140	3rd place, bronze medalist(s)	247
5	Laura Amaro (BRA)	B	~~107~~	~~107~~	107	6	133	~~137~~	139	4	246
6	Janette Ylisoini (FIN)	A	105	108	111 EJR	4	127	~~132~~	134 EJR	8	245 EJR
7	Jessica Jarquín (MEX)	A	101	104	~~106~~	10	128	132	135	6	239
8	Yekta Jamali (WRT)	A	102	106	108	5	125	~~130~~	130	13	238
9	Genna Toko Kegne (ITA)	B	100	103	~~106~~	12	125	130	134	7	237
10	Iryna Dombrovska (UKR)	A	~~105~~	105	~~108~~	9	124	128	131	11	236
11	Aremi Fuentes (MEX)	A	103	~~106~~	~~106~~	13	132	~~135~~	~~135~~	9	235
12	Rosalie Dumas (CAN)	B	100	103	~~105~~	11	~~124~~	125	128	14	231
13	Anna Amroyan (ARM)	B	~~100~~	100	~~105~~	17	~~129~~	~~129~~	130	12	230
14	Celia Gold (ISR)	B	~~99~~	99	~~102~~	19	128	131	~~134~~	10	230
15	Isabella Brown (GBR)	B	99	~~102~~	102	15	123	~~126~~	~~127~~	17	225
16	Jeon Hee-soo (KOR)	B	100	~~103~~	~~103~~	16	~~125~~	~~125~~	125	15	225
17	Lara Dancz (GER)	B	~~102~~	102	~~105~~	14	116	119	122	18	224
18	Keilin Coleman-Gooch (IRL)	C	90	~~93~~	93	27	119	122	124	16	217
19	Laura Vest Tolstrup (DEN)	B	92	95	~~97~~	23	~~117~~	118	121	19	216
20	Nicole Rubanovich (ISR)	C	97	~~101~~	~~103~~	20	116	~~120~~	~~122~~	22	213
21	Guðný Björk Stefánsdóttir (ISL)	C	90	93	96	21	114	117	~~119~~	20	213
22	Georgia Theron (NZL)	B	94	~~97~~	~~97~~	26	117	~~121~~	~~121~~	21	211
23	Heather Curtis (NZL)	C	~~93~~	93	96	22	~~113~~	113	~~117~~	24	209
24	Lijana Jakaitė (LTU)	C	~~91~~	91	94	25	~~111~~	111	114	23	208
25	Simona Jeřábková (CZE)	C	88	91	94	24	108	~~112~~	112	25	206
26	Rachel Enock (KEN)	C	85	~~90~~	90	28	100	105	~~110~~	26	195
27	Ivona Gavran (CRO)	C	83	86	~~88~~	29	102	~~105~~	~~106~~	27	188
28	Hanan Al-Ameer (KUW)	C	55	~~60~~	~~60~~	30	65	68	~~70~~	28	123
—	Bella Paredes (ECU)	A	105	~~110~~	~~111~~	8	~~130~~	~~133~~	~~133~~	—	—
—	Katrina Feklistova (GBR)	B	99	~~102~~	~~102~~	18	~~112~~	—	—	—	—
—	Eygló Fanndal Sturludóttir (ISL)	A	Did not start								
X	Laura Hughes (CWF)	C	88	~~91~~	92	X	115	119	122	X	214
X	Madison Farley (CWF)	C	88	91	94	X	114	~~118~~	~~118~~	X	208
X	Georgia Radley (CWF)	C	90	~~94~~	~~94~~	X	112	~~116~~	116	X	206
X	Agata Herbert (CWF)	C	88	91	~~93~~	X	111	114	~~116~~	X	205
X	Kaitlin Saunders (CWF)	C	80	83	~~85~~	X	102	106	108	X	191
