= Emma Poghosyan =

Armenian weightlifter

Personal information
- Nationality: Armenian
- Born: 26 August 2006 (age 20) Armavir, Armenia
- Occupation: Weightlifter

Sport
- Sport: Weightlifting
- Event: 81 kg
- Team: Armenia
Medal record
Women's weightlifting
Representing Armenia
European Championships
Gold medal – first place	2026 Batumi	86 kg
World Junior Championships
Gold medal – first place	2024 León	81 kg
Bronze medal – third place	2026 Ismailia	86 kg
World Youth Championships
Bronze medal – third place	2023 Durrës	81 kg
European Junior Championships
Silver medal – second place	2023 Bucharest	81 kg
European Youth Championships
Gold medal – first place	2023 Chișinău	81 kg
Gold medal – first place	2022 Poland	81 kg

Emma Poghosyan (born 26 August 2006) is an Armenian weightlifter, two-time European Youth champion, European Junior silver medalist, World Youth bronze medalist, and World Junior champion.

== Biography ==
Emma Poghosyan was born on August 26, 2006. She grew up in the village of Nalbandyan in the Armavir Province of Armenia. She currently resides in Gyumri and studies at the Gyumri State Sports College of Olympic Reserve.

In 2022, Emma Poghosyan won the gold medal in the 81 kg weight category at the European U15 Weightlifting Championships held in Poland.

In the spring of 2023, at the IWF World Youth Championships held in Durrës, Albania, she lifted 98 kg in the snatch and 123 kg in the clean and jerk. With a total result of 221 kg, she became a bronze medalist of the championships.

In the summer of 2023, Poghosyan won a silver medal at the European Junior Weightlifting Championships held in Bucharest, Romania.

Also in 2023, competing in the 81 kg category at the European Youth Weightlifting Championships in Chișinău, Moldova, she won the gold medal representing the Armenian national team with a total of 225 kg. During this competition, she set a new European Youth record in the clean and jerk by lifting 129 kg.

On September 25, 2024, at the IWF World Junior Championships held in León, Spain, the 18-year-old athlete won the gold medal in the 81 kg weight category with a total result of 233 kg.

At the 2026 European Weightlifting Championships held in Batumi, Georgia, the weightlifter won the gold medal in the 86 kg weight category with a total result of 248 kg.
