= Janette Ylisoini =

Finnish weightlifter (born 2006)

Personal information
- Full name: Anna Janette Tellervo Ylisoini
- Nationality: Finland
- Born: 6 April 2006 (age 20)
- Weight: 77 kg (170 lb)

Sport
- Country: Finland
- Sport: Weightlifting
- Event: 77 kg
Medal record
Women's Weightlifting
Representing Finland
European Championships
Gold medal – first place	2026 Batumi	77 kg
World Junior Championships
Silver medal – second place	2026 Ismailia	77 kg
European Junior Championships
Gold medal – first place	2025 Durrës	77 kg
Gold medal – first place	2026 Durrës	77 kg
Silver medal – second place	2023 Bucharest	71 kg

Anna Janette Tellervo Ylisoini is a Finnish weightlifter. She won a gold medal in the women's 77 kg category of the 2026 European Weightlifting Championships.

== Career ==
Ylisoini won a bronze medal in the snatch, a silver medal in the clean and jerk, and a silver medal in the total in the women's 71 kg category at the 2022 World Youth Weightlifting Championships. In the same year, she became champion at the European Youth Weightlifting Championships, winning three gold medals in the women's 71 kg category.

At the 2024 European Weightlifting Championships, she competed in the women's 71 kg category and finished seventh overall. At the 2026 European Weightlifting Championships, she won a gold medal in the women's 77 kg category with lifts of 113 kg in the snatch, 132 kg in the clean and jerk and a total of 245 kg.

== Achievements ==
Year	Venue	Weight	Snatch (kg)				Clean & Jerk (kg)				Total	Rank
Year	Venue	Weight	1	2	3	Rank	1	2	3	Rank	Total	Rank
World Championships
2022	Bogotá, Colombia	71 kg	88	91	93	26	107	~~110~~	110	29	203	28
2025	Førde, Norway	77 kg	105	108	111 EJR	4	127	~~132~~	134 EJR	8	245 EJR	6
European Championships
2023	Yerevan, Armenia	71 kg	~~90~~	90	~~94~~	14	108	~~111~~	~~111~~	12	198	13
2024	Sofia, Bulgaria	71 kg	101	~~104~~	~~104~~	5	120	123	~~126~~	8	224	7
2025	Chișinău, Moldova	71 kg	100	103	107	4	125	~~130~~	~~130~~	5	232	4
2026	(Georgia (country)) Batumi, Georgia	77 kg	108	111	113	1st place, gold medalist(s)	128	132	134	2nd place, silver medalist(s)	247	1st place, gold medalist(s)
European Junior Championships
2023	Bucharest, Romania	71 kg			96	2nd place, silver medalist(s)			119	2nd place, silver medalist(s)	215	2nd place, silver medalist(s)
2025	Durrës, Albania	77 kg			109	1st place, gold medalist(s)			135	1st place, gold medalist(s)	244	1st place, gold medalist(s)
