= 2026 World Junior Weightlifting Championships =

International weightlifting competition

2026 IWF World Junior Championships
- Venue: The Hall of the Suez Canal Authority Club, Suez Canal Stadium
- Location: Ismailia, Egypt
- Dates: 2–8 May 2026

The 2026 Junior World Weightlifting Championships was a weightlifting competition that was held in Ismailia, Egypt, from 2 to 8 May 2026.

== Medal table ==
Ranking by Big (Total result) medals

* Host nation (Egypt)

Rank	Nation	Gold	Silver	Bronze	Total
1	China	7	5	0	12
2	Iran	2	2	1	5
3	Venezuela	2	1	1	4
4	Armenia	1	1	1	3
5	Philippines	1	1	0	2
5	Thailand	1	1	0	2
7	Egypt*	1	0	1	2
7	Turkmenistan	1	0	1	2
9	Kazakhstan	0	1	1	2
10	Finland	0	1	0	1
10	Georgia	0	1	0	1
10	India	0	1	0	1
10	Mexico	0	1	0	1
14	Albania	0	0	1	1
14	Argentina	0	0	1	1
14	Canada	0	0	1	1
14	Ecuador	0	0	1	1
14	Greece	0	0	1	1
14	Italy	0	0	1	1
14	Russia	0	0	1	1
14	Turkey	0	0	1	1
14	Uzbekistan	0	0	1	1
14	Vietnam	0	0	1	1
Totals (23 entries)		16	16	16	48

Ranking by all medals: Big (Total result) and Small (Snatch and Clean & Jerk)

* Host nation (Egypt)

Rank	Nation	Gold	Silver	Bronze	Total
1	China	19	15	2	36
2	Iran	6	7	1	14
3	Venezuela	5	4	3	12
4	Egypt*	4	0	5	9
5	Thailand	3	4	1	8
6	Armenia	3	2	4	9
7	Philippines	2	2	0	4
8	Turkmenistan	2	1	1	4
9	Georgia	1	3	2	6
10	Kazakhstan	1	2	2	5
11	Mexico	1	2	1	4
12	Finland	1	2	0	3
13	India	0	2	1	3
14	Uzbekistan	0	1	3	4
15	Albania	0	1	2	3
16	Turkey	0	0	4	4
16	Vietnam	0	0	4	4
18	Russia	0	0	3	3
19	Argentina	0	0	2	2
19	Canada	0	0	2	2
19	Greece	0	0	2	2
19	Italy	0	0	2	2
23	Ecuador	0	0	1	1
Totals (23 entries)		48	48	48	144

== Medal overview ==
=== Men ===
Event		Gold		Silver		Bronze	
– 60 kg	Snatch	Kuang Chengmin (CHN)	127 kg	Kang Lixin (CHN)	126 kg	K'Duong (VIE)	125 kg
– 60 kg	Clean & Jerk	Kang Lixin (CHN)	164 kg	Kuang Chengmin (CHN)	162 kg	K'Duong (VIE)	157 kg
– 60 kg	Total	Kang Lixin (CHN)	290 kg	Kuang Chengmin (CHN)	289 kg	K'Duong (VIE)	282 kg
– 65 kg	Snatch	Wang Liqian (CHN)	138 kg	Samoel Rrasa (ALB)	134 kg	A Tiêu (VIE)	134 kg
– 65 kg	Clean & Jerk	Wan Jinping (CHN)	165 kg	Wang Liqian (CHN)	164 kg	El-Sayed Aly Attia (EGY)	160 kg
– 65 kg	Total	Wang Liqian (CHN)	302 kg	Wan Jinping (CHN)	297 kg	El-Sayed Aly Attia (EGY)	291 kg
– 71 kg	Snatch	Narek Grigoryan (ARM)	144 kg	Yash Khandagale (IND)	140 kg	Revaz Mildiani (GEO)	140 kg
– 71 kg	Clean & Jerk	Albert Delos Santos (PHI)	187 kg JWR	Hovhannes Hovhannisyan (ARM)	171 kg	Yash Khandagale (IND)	169 kg
– 71 kg	Total	Albert Delos Santos (PHI)	326 kg	Yash Khandagale (IND)	309 kg	Jimmy López (ECU)	301 kg
– 79 kg	Snatch	Abdelrahman Hussein (EGY)	153 kg	Boburmirzo Yokubov (UZB)	152 kg	Ali Abdelradi (EGY)	151 kg YWR
– 79 kg	Clean & Jerk	Abdelrahman Hussein (EGY)	188 kg	Didarbek Jumabaýew (TKM)	187 kg	Narek Mkrtchyan (ARM)	336 kg
– 79 kg	Total	Abdelrahman Hussein (EGY)	341 kg	Narek Mkrtchyan (ARM)	336 kg	Didarbek Jumabaýew (TKM)	335 kg
– 88 kg	Snatch	Ángel Rodríguez (VEN)	168 kg	Alikhan Askerbay (KAZ)	161 kg	Moustafa Mahmoud Bakry (EGY)	158 kg
– 88 kg	Clean & Jerk	Yerasyl Saulebekov (KAZ)	199 kg	Ángel Rodríguez (VEN)	197 kg	Alikhan Askerbay (KAZ)	194 kg
– 88 kg	Total	Ángel Rodríguez (VEN)	365 kg	Yerasyl Saulebekov (KAZ)	356 kg	Alikhan Askerbay (KAZ)	355 kg
– 94 kg	Snatch	Goga Jajvani (GEO)	167 kg	Mauricio Loaiza (VEN)	166 kg	Valerik Movsisyan (ARM)	164 kg
– 94 kg	Clean & Jerk	Mauricio Loaiza (VEN)	207 kg	Hamidreza Zarei (IRI)	204 kg	Goga Jajvani (GEO)	200 kg
– 94 kg	Total	Mauricio Loaiza (VEN)	373 kg	Goga Jajvani (GEO)	367 kg	Hamidreza Zarei (IRI)	366 kg
– 110 kg	Snatch	Abolfazl Zare (IRI)	180 kg	Farhad Gholizadeh (IRI)	179 kg	Simone Abati (ITA)	173 kg
– 110 kg	Clean & Jerk	Abolfazl Zare (IRI)	220 kg	Farhad Gholizadeh (IRI)	208 kg	Wang Guizhou (CHN)	207 kg
– 110 kg	Total	Abolfazl Zare (IRI)	400 kg	Farhad Gholizadeh (IRI)	387 kg	Simone Abati (ITA)	373 kg
+ 110 kg	Snatch	Hamidreza Mohammadi (IRI)	180 kg	Taha Nemati (IRI)	172 kg	Selahattin Altın (TUR)	170 kg
+ 110 kg	Clean & Jerk	Hamidreza Mohammadi (IRI)	221 kg	Taha Nemati (IRI)	220 kg	Omadillo Olimov (UZB)	219 kg
+ 110 kg	Total	Hamidreza Mohammadi (IRI)	401 kg	Taha Nemati (IRI)	392 kg	Omadillo Olimov (UZB)	388 kg

=== Women ===
Event		Gold		Silver		Bronze	
– 48 kg	Snatch	Zeng Zailian (CHN)	81 kg	Angeline Colonia (PHI)	80 kg	Suthasini Kaeosingkhon (THA)	77 kg
– 48 kg	Clean & Jerk	Zeng Zailian (CHN)	108 kg	Naruemol Vonghajak (THA)	101 kg	Rébéka Groulx (CAN)	97 kg
– 48 kg	Total	Zeng Zailian (CHN)	189 kg	Angeline Colonia (PHI)	177 kg	Rébéka Groulx (CAN)	174 kg
– 53 kg	Snatch	Peng Tianfeng (CHN)	90 kg	Natcha Kaewnoi (THA)	87 kg	Maria Stratoudaki (GRE)	86 kg
– 53 kg	Clean & Jerk	Peng Tianfeng (CHN)	113 kg	Natcha Kaewnoi (THA)	108 kg	Basma Gunaidy (EGY)	106 kg
– 53 kg	Total	Peng Tianfeng (CHN)	203 kg	Natcha Kaewnoi (THA)	195 kg	Maria Stratoudaki (GRE)	188 kg
– 58 kg	Snatch	Ye Xinye (CHN)	100 kg JWR	Joseline López (MEX)	92 kg	Yilihannys Jiménez (VEN)	92 kg
– 58 kg	Clean & Jerk	Joseline López (MEX)	121 kg	Ye Xinye (CHN)	120 kg	María Paz Casadevall (ARG)	115 kg
– 58 kg	Total	Ye Xinye (CHN)	220 kg	Joseline López (MEX)	213 kg	María Paz Casadevall (ARG)	206 kg
– 63 kg	Snatch	Thanaporn Saetia (THA)	100 kg	Jiang Yanfang (CHN)	95 kg	Ziyoda Khudoykulova (UZB)	93 kg
– 63 kg	Clean & Jerk	Thanaporn Saetia (THA)	125 kg	Jiang Yanfang (CHN)	124 kg	Lidett Miramontes (MEX)	115 kg
– 63 kg	Total	Thanaporn Saetia (THA)	225 kg	Jiang Yanfang (CHN)	219 kg	Diana Bellorín (VEN)	207 kg
– 69 kg	Snatch	Claudia Rengifo (VEN)	108 kg	Lin Jingwei (CHN)	107 kg	Tuğba Nur Koz (TUR)	105 kg
– 69 kg	Clean & Jerk	Lin Jingwei (CHN)	138 kg JWR	Claudia Rengifo (VEN)	131 kg	Enkileda Carja (ALB)	125 kg
– 69 kg	Total	Lin Jingwei (CHN)	245 kg JWR	Claudia Rengifo (VEN)	239 kg	Enkileda Carja (ALB)	229 kg
– 77 kg	Snatch	Janette Ylisoini (FIN)	108 kg	Nana Khorava (GEO)	108 kg	Varvara Kuzminova (RUS)	107 kg
– 77 kg	Clean & Jerk	Anna Amroyan (ARM)	134 kg	Janette Ylisoini (FIN)	131 kg	Varvara Kuzminova (RUS)	130 kg
– 77 kg	Total	Anna Amroyan (ARM)	240 kg	Janette Ylisoini (FIN)	239 kg	Varvara Kuzminova (RUS)	237 kg
– 86 kg	Snatch	Rahma Ahmed (EGY)	114 kg	Mariam Murgvliani (GEO)	111 kg	Xu Linyue (CHN)	110 kg
– 86 kg	Clean & Jerk	Anamjan Rustamowa (TKM)	147 kg	Xu Linyue (CHN)	146 kg	Emma Poghosyan (ARM)	144 kg
– 86 kg	Total	Anamjan Rustamowa (TKM)	257 kg	Xu Linyue (CHN)	256 kg	Emma Poghosyan (ARM)	253 kg
+ 86 kg	Snatch	Zhang Yuxin (CHN)	126 kg	Hu Wenxun (CHN)	125 kg YWR	Bárbara Mendoza (VEN)	110 kg
+ 86 kg	Clean & Jerk	Zhang Yuxin (CHN)	164 kg	Hu Wenxun (CHN)	163 kg YWR	Tuana Süren (TUR)	138 kg
+ 86 kg	Total	Zhang Yuxin (CHN)	290 kg	Hu Wenxun (CHN)	288 kg YWR	Tuana Süren (TUR)	247 kg

== Team ranking ==
Men

Rank	Team	Points
1	Iran	520
2	Egypt	427
3	Venezuela	380
4	Russia	376
5	China	337
6	Georgia	296

Women

Rank	Team	Points
1	China	637
2	Russia	433
3	Egypt	411
4	Mexico	397
5	Venezuela	395
6	Thailand	363
