= List of Oceanian junior records in Olympic weightlifting =

This is the list of Oceanian junior records in Olympic weightlifting. They are the best results set in competition by athletes aged 20 throughout the entire calendar year of the performance. Records are maintained in each weight class for the snatch, clean and jerk, and the total for both by the Oceania Weightlifting Federation (OWF).

== Current records ==
Key to tables: Awaiting ratification Not ratified or later rescinded by OWF

=== Men ===
| Event | Record | Athlete | Nation | Date | Meet | Place | Age | Ref |
60 kg
| Snatch | 110 kg | OWF Standard | | | | | | |
| Clean & Jerk | 135 kg | OWF Standard | | | | | | |
| Total | 245 kg | OWF Standard | | | | | | |
65 kg
| Snatch | 116 kg | Ditto Ika | Nauru | 2 July 2025 | Pacific Mini Games | Meyuns, Palau | 18 years, 339 days | |
| Clean & Jerk | 152 kg | Ditto Ika | Nauru | 2 July 2025 | Pacific Mini Games | Meyuns, Palau | 18 years, 339 days | |
| Total | 268 kg | Ditto Ika | Nauru | 2 July 2025 | Pacific Mini Games | Meyuns, Palau | 18 years, 339 days | |
70 kg
| Snatch | 120 kg | OWF Standard | | | | | | |
| Clean & Jerk | 150 kg | OWF Standard | | | | | | |
| Total | 270 kg | OWF Standard | | | | | | |
75 kg
| Snatch | 125 kg | OWF Standard | | | | | | |
| Clean & Jerk | 160 kg | OWF Standard | | | | | | |
| Total | 280 kg | OWF Standard | | | | | | |
85 kg
| Snatch | 130 kg | OWF Standard | | | | | | |
| Clean & Jerk | 165 kg | OWF Standard | | | | | | |
| Total | 295 kg | OWF Standard | | | | | | |
95 kg
| Snatch | 140 kg | Emmanuel Ulimasao | Samoa | 20 September 2026 | Oceania Cup | Hawthorn, Australia | 20 years, 101 days | |
| Clean & Jerk | 175 kg | Emmanuel Ulimasao | Samoa | 20 September 2026 | Oceania Cup | Hawthorn, Australia | 20 years, 101 days | |
| Total | 315 kg | Emmanuel Ulimasao | Samoa | 20 September 2026 | Oceania Cup | Hawthorn, Australia | 20 years, 101 days | |
110 kg
| Snatch | 140 kg | Zion Tokona | Fiji | 4 July 2025 | Pacific Mini Games | Meyuns, Palau | 18 years, 68 days | |
| Clean & Jerk | 175 kg | Zion Tokona | Fiji | 4 July 2025 | Pacific Mini Games | Meyuns, Palau | 18 years, 68 days | |
| Total | 315 kg | Zion Tokona | Fiji | 4 July 2025 | Pacific Mini Games | Meyuns, Palau | 18 years, 68 days | |
+110 kg
| Snatch | 155 kg | Isyss Schuster | New Zealand | 30 August 2025 | Commonwealth Junior Championships | Ahmedabad, India | 18 years, 37 days | |
| Clean & Jerk | 183 kg | Isyss Schuster | New Zealand | 30 August 2025 | Commonwealth Junior Championships | Ahmedabad, India | 18 years, 37 days | |
| Total | 338 kg | Isyss Schuster | New Zealand | 30 August 2025 | Commonwealth Junior Championships | Ahmedabad, India | 18 years, 37 days | |

=== Women ===
| Event | Record | Athlete | Nation | Date | Meet | Place | Age | Ref |
49 kg
| Snatch | 67 kg | OWF Standard | | | | | | |
| Clean & Jerk | 83 kg | OWF Standard | | | | | | |
| Total | 150 kg | OWF Standard | | | | | | |
53 kg
| Snatch | 75 kg | Chloe Perkins | Australia | 13 November 2025 | | Hawthorn, Australia | 19 years, 271 days | |
| Clean & Jerk | 91 kg | Chloe Perkins | Australia | 26 August 2025 | Commonwealth Junior Championships | Ahmedabad, India | 19 years, 192 days | |
| Total | 166 kg | Chloe Perkins | Australia | 13 November 2025 | | Hawthorn, Australia | 19 years, 271 days | |
57 kg
| Snatch | 77 kg | OWF Standard | | | | | | |
| Clean & Jerk | 97 kg | OWF Standard | | | | | | |
| Total | 174 kg | OWF Standard | | | | | | |
61 kg
| Snatch | 90 kg | OWF Standard | | | | | | |
| Snatch | 95 kg | Femily-Crystie Notte | Nauru | 1 November 2026 | World Championships | Ningbo, China | 17 years, 190 days | |
| Clean & Jerk | 110 kg | OWF Standard | | | | | | |
| Total | 200 kg | OWF Standard | | | | | | |
| Total | 205 kg | Femily-Crystie Notte | Nauru | 1 November 2026 | World Championships | Ningbo, China | 17 years, 190 days | |
69 kg
| Snatch | 103 kg | Olivia Selemaia | New Zealand | 12 April 2025 | Oceania Junior Championships | Hawthorn, Australia | 19 years, 44 days | |
| Clean & Jerk | 123 kg | Olivia Selemaia | New Zealand | 28 August 2025 | Commonwealth Championships | Ahmedabad, India | 19 years, 183 days | |
| Clean & Jerk | 124 kg | Olivia Selemaia | New Zealand | 7 October 2025 | World Championships | Førde, Norway | 19 years, 223 days | |
| Total | 223 kg | Olivia Selemaia | New Zealand | 12 April 2025 | Oceania Junior Championships | Hawthorn, Australia | 19 years, 44 days | |
| Total | 226 kg | Olivia Selemaia | New Zealand | 7 October 2025 | World Championships | Førde, Norway | 19 years, 223 days | |
77 kg
| Snatch | 107 kg | Seine Stowers | Samoa | 16 November 2025 | | Hawthorn, Australia | 17 years, 200 days | |
| Snatch | 112 kg | Seine Stowers | Samoa | 30 April 2026 | Oceania Championships | Apia, Samoa | 18 years, 0 days | |
| Clean & Jerk | 137 kg | Seine Stowers | Samoa | 16 November 2025 | | Hawthorn, Australia | 17 years, 200 days | |
| Clean & Jerk | 142 kg | Seine Stowers | Samoa | 30 April 2026 | Oceania Championships | Apia, Samoa | 18 years, 0 days | |
| Total | 244 kg | Seine Stowers | Samoa | 16 November 2025 | | Hawthorn, Australia | 17 years, 200 days | |
| Total | 254 kg | Seine Stowers | Samoa | 30 April 2026 | Oceania Championships | Apia, Samoa | 18 years, 0 days | |
86 kg
| Snatch | 107 kg | Litia Nacagilevu | New Zealand | 29 August 2025 | Commonwealth Junior Championships | Ahmedabad, India | 17 years, 334 days | |
| Snatch | 111 kg | Litia Nacagilevu | New Zealand | 30 April 2026 | Oceania Championships | Apia, Samoa | 18 years, 213 days | |
| Clean & Jerk | 128 kg | Litia Nacagilevu | New Zealand | 29 August 2025 | Commonwealth Junior Championships | Ahmedabad, India | 17 years, 334 days | |
| Clean & Jerk | 129 kg | Litia Nacagilevu | New Zealand | 30 April 2026 | Oceania Championships | Apia, Samoa | 18 years, 213 days | |
| Total | 235 kg | Litia Nacagilevu | New Zealand | 29 August 2025 | Commonwealth Junior Championships | Ahmedabad, India | 17 years, 334 days | |
| Total | 240 kg | Litia Nacagilevu | New Zealand | 30 April 2026 | Oceania Championships | Apia, Samoa | 18 years, 213 days | |
+86 kg
| Snatch | 105 kg | OWF Standard | | | | | | |
| Clean & Jerk | 130 kg | OWF Standard | | | | | | |
| Clean & Jerk | 132 kg | Mollie King | New Zealand | 1 May 2026 | Oceania Championships | Apia, Samoa | 18 years, 107 days | |
| Total | 235 kg | OWF Standard | | | | | | |

== Historical records ==
=== Men (2025–2026) ===
| Event | Record | Athlete | Nation | Date | Meet | Place | Age | Ref |
71 kg
| Snatch | 120 kg | OWF Standard | | | | | | |
| Clean & Jerk | 150 kg | OWF Standard | | | | | | |
| Total | 270 kg | OWF Standard | | | | | | |
79 kg
| Snatch | 125 kg | OWF Standard | | | | | | |
| Snatch | 130 kg | Kyle Itsimaera | Nauru | 29 April 2026 | Oceania Championships | Apia, Samoa | 17 years, 210 days | |
| Clean & Jerk | 160 kg | Sione Sasa | Samoa | 11 April 2025 | Oceania Junior Championships | Hawthorn, Australia | 17 years, 83 days | |
| Total | 280 kg | Sione Sasa | Samoa | 11 April 2025 | Oceania Junior Championships | Hawthorn, Australia | 17 years, 83 days | |
| Total | 286 kg | Kyle Itsimaera | Nauru | 29 April 2026 | Oceania Championships | Apia, Samoa | 17 years, 210 days | |
88 kg
| Snatch | 142 kg | Nehemiah Elder | Fiji | 11 April 2025 | Oceania Junior Championships | Hawthorn, Australia | 16 years, 28 days | |
| Snatch | 155 kg | Nehemiah Elder | Fiji | 4 July 2025 | Pacific Mini Games | Meyuns, Palau | 16 years, 112 days | |
| Clean & Jerk | 175 kg | Nehemiah Elder | Fiji | 11 April 2025 | Oceania Junior Championships | Hawthorn, Australia | 16 years, 28 days | |
| Total | 317 kg | Nehemiah Elder | Fiji | 11 April 2025 | Oceania Junior Championships | Hawthorn, Australia | 16 years, 28 days | |
| Total | 330 kg | Nehemiah Elder | Fiji | 4 July 2025 | Pacific Mini Games | Meyuns, Palau | 16 years, 112 days | |
94 kg
| Snatch | 146 kg | Emmanuel Ulimasao | Samoa | 30 April 2026 | Oceania Championships | Apia, Samoa | 19 years, 323 days | |
| Clean & Jerk | 180 kg | Emmanuel Ulimasao | Samoa | 4 July 2025 | Pacific Mini Games | Apia, Samoa | 19 years, 23 days | |
| Total | 321 kg | Emmanuel Ulimasao | Samoa | 30 April 2026 | Oceania Championships | Apia, Samoa | 19 years, 323 days | |
| Total | 324 kg | Emmanuel Ulimasao | Samoa | 29 July 2026 | Commonwealth Games | Glasgow, United Kingdom | 20 years, 48 days | |

=== Men (2018–2025) ===
| Event | Record | Athlete | Nation | Date | Meet | Place | Age | Ref |
55 kg
| Snatch | 105 kg | OWF Standard | | | | | | |
| Clean & Jerk | 126 kg | OWF Standard | | | | | | |
| Total | 230 kg | OWF Standard | | | | | | |
61 kg
| Snatch | 113 kg | OWF Standard | | | | | | |
| Clean & Jerk | 136 kg | OWF Standard | | | | | | |
| Total | 248 kg | OWF Standard | | | | | | |
67 kg
| Snatch | 120 kg | OWF Standard | | | | | | |
| Clean & Jerk | 154 kg | Ditto Titus Ika | Nauru | 6 October 2023 | Oceania Junior & Youth Championships | Apia, Samoa | 17 years, 68 days | |
| Total | 269 kg | Ditto Titus Ika | Nauru | 6 October 2023 | Oceania Junior & Youth Championships | Apia, Samoa | 17 years, 68 days | |
73 kg
| Snatch | 131 kg | John Tafi | Samoa | 29 May 2022 | | Apia, Samoa | 20 years, 19 days | |
| Clean & Jerk | 166 kg | John Tafi | Samoa | 29 May 2022 | | Apia, Samoa | 20 years, 19 days | |
| Total | 297 kg | John Tafi | Samoa | 29 May 2022 | | Apia, Samoa | 20 years, 19 days | |
81 kg
| Snatch | 138 kg | Jack Opeloge | Samoa | 12 July 2019 | Pacific Games | Apia, Samoa | 18 years, 325 days | |
| Clean & Jerk | 161 kg | OWF Standard | | | | | | |
| Total | 298 kg | Jack Opeloge | Samoa | 12 July 2019 | Pacific Games | Apia, Samoa | 18 years, 325 days | |
89 kg
| Snatch | 142 kg | Don Opeloge | Samoa | 6 November 2018 | World Championships | Ashgabat, Turkmenistan | 19 years, 177 days | |
| Snatch | 156 kg | Don Opeloge | Samoa | 28 April 2019 | Arafura Games | Darwin, Australia | 19 years, 350 days | |
| Clean & Jerk | 198 kg | Don Opeloge | Samoa | 4 June 2019 | Junior World Championships | Suva, Fiji | 20 years, 22 days | |
| Total | 349 kg | Don Opeloge | Samoa | 4 June 2019 | Junior World Championships | Suva, Fiji | 20 years, 22 days | |
96 kg
| Snatch | 160 kg | Don Opeloge | Samoa | 10 November 2019 | IWF Grand Prix ODESUR CSLP | Lima, Peru | 20 years, 285 days | |
| Clean & Jerk | 202 kg | Don Opeloge | Samoa | 11 December 2019 | IWF World Cup | Tianjin, China | 20 years, 316 days | |
| Total | 361 kg | Don Opeloge | Samoa | 10 November 2019 | IWF Grand Prix ODESUR CSLP | Lima, Peru | 20 years, 285 days | |
102 kg
| Snatch | 148 kg | OWF Standard | | | | | | |
| Clean & Jerk | 178 kg | OWF Standard | | | | | | |
| Total | 325 kg | OWF Standard | | | | | | |
109 kg
| Snatch | 151 kg | OWF Standard | | | | | | |
| Clean & Jerk | 183 kg | OWF Standard | | | | | | |
| Total | 333 kg | OWF Standard | | | | | | |
+109 kg
| Snatch | 163 kg | OWF Standard | | | | | | |
| Clean & Jerk | 197 kg | OWF Standard | | | | | | |
| Total | 359 kg | OWF Standard | | | | | | |

=== Men (1998–2018) ===
| Event | Record | Athlete | Nation | Date | Meet | Place | Age | Ref |
–56 kg
| Snatch | 106 kg | Manueli Tulo | Fiji | 4 May 2010 | Oceania Championships | Suva, Fiji | 20 years, 40 days | |
| Clean & Jerk | 140 kg | Manueli Tulo | Fiji | 20 November 2010 | Moindou Cup | Moindou, New Caledonia | 20 years, 240 days | |
| Total | 245 kg | Manueli Tulo | Fiji | 20 November 2010 | Moindou Cup | Moindou, New Caledonia | 20 years, 240 days | |
–62 kg
| Snatch | 111 kg | Tuau Lapua Lapua | Tuvalu | 24 October 2011 | | Noumea, New Caledonia | 20 years, 192 days | |
| Clean & Jerk | 140 kg | David Sarkisian | Australia | 29 March 2003 | VWA Open | Hawthorn, Australia | 16 years, 92 days | |
| Total | 250 kg | David Sarkisian | Australia | 29 March 2003 | VWA Open | Hawthorn, Australia | 16 years, 92 days | |
–69 kg
| Snatch | 135 kg OC | Yukio Peter | Nauru | 18 September 2004 | Olympic Games | Athens, Greece | 20 years, 233 days | |
| Clean & Jerk | 172 kg | Yukio Peter | Nauru | 26 June 2004 | Commonwealth Championships | Valletta, Malta | 20 years, 149 days | |
| Total | 302 kg OC | Yukio Peter | Nauru | 6 May 2004 | Oceania Championships | Suva, Fiji | 20 years, 98 days | |
–77 kg
| Snatch | 145 kg | Yukio Peter | Nauru | 24 December 2004 | | Nauru | 20 years, 330 days | |
| Clean & Jerk | 180 kg | Yukio Peter | Nauru | 18 June 2004 | | Sigatoka, Fiji | 20 years, 141 days | |
| Total | 325 kg | Yukio Peter | Nauru | 24 December 2004 | | Nauru | 20 years, 330 days | |
–85 kg
| Snatch | 140 kg | Steven Kari | Papua New Guinea | 6 September 2011 | | Noumea, New Caledonia | 18 years, 116 days | |
| Clean & Jerk | 184 kg | Steven Kari | Papua New Guinea | 8 June 2012 | Oceania Championships | Apia, Samoa | 19 years, 26 days | |
| Total | 324 kg | Steven Kari | Papua New Guinea | 8 June 2012 | Oceania Championships | Apia, Samoa | 19 years, 26 days | |
–94 kg
| Snatch | 152 kg | Steven Kari | Papua New Guinea | 29 November 2013 | Commonwealth Championships | Penang, Malaysia | 20 years, 197 days | |
| Clean & Jerk | 200 kg | Steven Kari | Papua New Guinea | 29 November 2013 | Commonwealth Championships | Penang, Malaysia | 20 years, 197 days | |
| Total | 352 kg | Steven Kari | Papua New Guinea | 29 November 2013 | Commonwealth Championships | Penang, Malaysia | 20 years, 197 days | |
–105 kg
| Snatch | 153 kg | Steven Kari | Papua New Guinea | 16 November 2013 | Ian Laurie Cup | Melbourne, Australia | 20 years, 187 days | |
| Clean & Jerk | 200 kg | Steven Kari | Papua New Guinea | 16 November 2013 | Ian Laurie Cup | Melbourne, Australia | 20 years, 187 days | |
| Total | 353 kg | Steven Kari | Papua New Guinea | 16 November 2013 | Ian Laurie Cup | Melbourne, Australia | 20 years, 187 days | |
+105 kg
| Snatch | 170 kg | Itte Detenamo | Nauru | 8 December 2006 | | Samoa, Apia | 20 years, 77 days | |
| Clean & Jerk | 216 kg | David Liti | New Zealand | 10 December 2016 | Club Contest | Auckland, New Zealand | 20 years, 152 days | |
| Total | 377 kg | Itte Detenamo | Nauru | 8 December 2006 | | Samoa, Apia | 20 years, 77 days | |

=== Women (2025–2026) ===
| Event | Record | Athlete | Nation | Date | Meet | Place | Age | Ref |
48 kg
| Snatch | 65 kg | OWF Standard | | | | | | |
| Snatch | 71 kg | Jo-Beth Deireragea | Nauru | 27 April 2026 | Oceania Championships | Apia, Samoa | 18 years, 123 days | |
| Clean & Jerk | 80 kg | OWF Standard | | | | | | |
| Clean & Jerk | 86 kg | Jo-Beth Deireragea | Nauru | 27 April 2026 | Oceania Championships | Apia, Samoa | 18 years, 123 days | |
| Clean & Jerk | 91 kg | Jo-Beth Deireragea | Nauru | 26 July 2026 | Commonwealth Games | Glasgow, United Kingdom | 18 years, 213 days | |
| Total | 145 kg | OWF Standard | | | | | | |
| Total | 157 kg | Jo-Beth Deireragea | Nauru | 27 April 2026 | Oceania Championships | Apia, Samoa | 18 years, 123 days | |
| Total | 161 kg | Jo-Beth Deireragea | Nauru | 26 July 2026 | Commonwealth Games | Glasgow, United Kingdom | 18 years, 213 days | |
58 kg
| Snatch | 77 kg | Ashley Kolomoisky | Australia | 11 April 2025 | Oceania Junior Championships | Hawthorn, Australia | 18 years, 274 days | |
| Snatch | 79 kg | Ashley Kolomoisky | Australia | 26 August 2025 | Commonwealth Junior Championships | Ahmedabad, India | 19 years, 46 days | |
| Clean & Jerk | 96 kg | Ashley Kolomoisky | Australia | 11 April 2025 | Oceania Junior Championships | Hawthorn, Australia | 18 years, 274 days | |
| Clean & Jerk | 97 kg | Juliana Ghetto | Australia | 26 August 2025 | Commonwealth Junior Championships | Ahmedabad, India | 18 years, 344 days | |
| Total | 173 kg | Ashley Kolomoisky | Australia | 11 April 2025 | Oceania Junior Championships | Hawthorn, Australia | 18 years, 274 days | |
| Total | 174 kg | Juliana Ghetto | Australia | 26 August 2025 | Commonwealth Junior Championships | Ahmedabad, India | 18 years, 344 days | |
63 kg
| Snatch | 85 kg | OWF Standard | | | | | | |
| Snatch | 88 kg | Femily-Crystie Notte | Nauru | 27 August 2025 | Commonwealth Junior Championships | Ahmedabad, India | 16 years, 124 days | |
| Snatch | 90 kg | Femily-Crystie Notte | Nauru | 3 July 2025 | Pacific Mini Games | Meyuns, Palau | 16 years, 69 days | |
| Snatch | 101 kg | Femily-Crystie Notte | Nauru | 29 April 2026 | Oceania Championships | Apia, Samoa | 17 years, 4 days | |
| Clean & Jerk | 100 kg | OWF Standard | | | | | | |
| Clean & Jerk | 104 kg | Layla Bloom | Australia | 11 April 2025 | Oceania Junior Championships | Hawthorn, Australia | 19 years, 256 days | |
| Clean & Jerk | 111 kg | Femily-Crystie Notte | Nauru | 3 July 2025 | Pacific Mini Games | Meyuns, Palau | 16 years, 69 days | |
| Clean & Jerk | 112 kg | Femily-Crystie Notte | Nauru | 27 August 2025 | Commonwealth Junior Championships | Ahmedabad, India | 16 years, 124 days | |
| Clean & Jerk | 123 kg | Femily-Crystie Notte | Nauru | 29 April 2026 | Oceania Championships | Apia, Samoa | 17 years, 4 days | |
| Total | 185 kg | OWF Standard | | | | | | |
| Total | 200 kg | Femily-Crystie Notte | Nauru | 27 August 2025 | Commonwealth Junior Championships | Ahmedabad, India | 16 years, 124 days | |
| Total | 201 kg | Femily-Crystie Notte | Nauru | 3 July 2025 | Pacific Mini Games | Meyuns, Palau | 16 years, 69 days | |
| Total | 224 kg | Femily-Crystie Notte | Nauru | 29 April 2026 | Oceania Championships | Apia, Samoa | 17 years, 4 days | |

=== Women (2018–2025) ===
| Event | Record | Athlete | Nation | Date | Meet | Place | Age | Ref |
45 kg
| Snatch | 62 kg | OWF Standard | | | | | | |
| Clean & Jerk | 78 kg | OWF Standard | | | | | | |
| Total | 139 kg | OWF Standard | | | | | | |
49 kg
| Snatch | 66 kg | OWF Standard | | | | | | |
| Clean & Jerk | 83 kg | OWF Standard | | | | | | |
| Total | 148 kg | OWF Standard | | | | | | |
55 kg
| Snatch | 76 kg | Lorah Maelosia | Solomon Islands | 20 November 2023 | Pacific Games | Honiara, Solomon Islands | 16 years, 364 days | |
| Clean & Jerk | 92 kg | Lorah Maelosia | Solomon Islands | 5 October 2023 | Oceania Junior & Youth Championships | Apia, Samoa | 16 years, 318 days | |
| Clean & Jerk | 94 kg | Lorah Maelosia | Solomon Islands | 20 November 2023 | Pacific Games | Honiara, Solomon Islands | 16 years, 364 days | |
| Total | 162 kg | Lorah Maelosia | Solomon Islands | 5 October 2023 | Oceania Junior & Youth Championships | Apia, Samoa | 16 years, 318 days | |
| Total | 170 kg | Lorah Maelosia | Solomon Islands | 20 November 2023 | Pacific Games | Honiara, Solomon Islands | 16 years, 364 days | |
59 kg
| Snatch | 76 kg | Shimara Wini | Solomon Islands | 5 October 2023 | Oceania Junior & Youth Championships | Apia, Samoa | 18 years, 208 days | |
| Snatch | 80 kg | Ashley Kolomoisky | Australia | 2 May 2025 | World Junior Championships | Lima, Peru | 18 years, 295 days | |
| Clean & Jerk | 95 kg | OWF Standard | | | | | | |
| Clean & Jerk | 97 kg | Ashley Kolomoisky | Australia | 2 May 2025 | World Junior Championships | Lima, Peru | 18 years, 295 days | |
| Total | 170 kg | Shimara Wini | Solomon Islands | 5 October 2023 | Oceania Junior & Youth Championships | Apia, Samoa | 18 years, 208 days | |
| Total | 177 kg | Ashley Kolomoisky | Australia | 2 May 2025 | World Junior Championships | Lima, Peru | 18 years, 295 days | |
64 kg
| Snatch | 85 kg | Nancy Abouke | Nauru | 27 April 2019 | Arafura Games | Darwin, Australia | 15 years, 296 days | |
| Snatch | 86 kg | Nancy Abouke | Nauru | 7 December 2019 | Pacific Cup | Noumea, New Caledonia | 16 years, 155 days | |
| Snatch | 90 kg | Femily-Crystie Notte | Nauru | 23 February 2024 | Oceania Junior & Youth Championships | Auckland, New Zealand | 14 years, 304 days | |
| Snatch | 92 kg | Femily-Crystie Notte | Nauru | 2 May 2025 | World Youth Championships | Lima, Peru | 16 years, 7 days | |
| Clean & Jerk | 110 kg | Nancy Abouke | Nauru | 4 June 2019 | Junior World Championships | Suva, Fiji | 15 years, 334 days | |
| Clean & Jerk | 115 kg | Femily-Crystie Notte | Nauru | 23 February 2024 | Oceania Junior & Youth Championships | Auckland, New Zealand | 14 years, 304 days | |
| Total | 190 kg | Nancy Abouke | Nauru | 10 July 2019 | Pacific Games | Apia, Samoa | 16 years, 5 days | |
| Total | 205 kg | Femily-Crystie Notte | Nauru | 23 February 2024 | Oceania Junior & Youth Championships | Auckland, New Zealand | 14 years, 304 days | |
71 kg
| Snatch | 90 kg | Nancy Abouke | Nauru | 28 May 2022 | | Nauru | 18 years, 327 days | |
| Snatch | 92 kg | Olivia Selemaia | New Zealand | 14 October 2023 | | Auckland, New Zealand | 17 years, 230 days | |
| Snatch | 106 kg | Olivia Selemaia | New Zealand | 3 May 2025 | World Junior Championships | Lima, Peru | 19 years, 66 days | |
| Clean & Jerk | 111 kg | Nancy Abouke | Nauru | 29 February 2020 | | Canberra, Australia | 16 years, 239 days | |
| Clean & Jerk | 113 kg | Maximina Uepa | Nauru | 7 December 2019 | Pacific Cup | Noumea, New Caledonia | 17 years, 76 days | |
| Clean & Jerk | 129 kg | Olivia Selemaia | New Zealand | 3 May 2025 | World Junior Championships | Lima, Peru | 19 years, 66 days | |
| Total | 200 kg | Nancy Abouke | Nauru | 28 May 2022 | | Nauru | 18 years, 327 days | |
| Total | 200 kg | Maximina Uepa | Nauru | 7 December 2019 | Pacific Cup | Noumea, New Caledonia | 17 years, 76 days | |
| Total | 201 kg | Maximina Uepa | Nauru | 11 December 2022 | World Championships | Bogotá, Colombia | 20 years, 80 days | |
| Total | 235 kg | Olivia Selemaia | New Zealand | 3 May 2025 | World Junior Championships | Lima, Peru | 19 years, 66 days | |
76 kg
| Snatch | 98 kg | Kanah Andrews-Nahu | New Zealand | 5 June 2019 | Junior World Championships | Suva, Fiji | 18 years, 138 days | |
| Clean & Jerk | 119 kg | Maximina Uepa | Nauru | 2 August 2022 | Commonwealth Games | Marston Green, United Kingdom | 19 years, 314 days | |
| Clean & Jerk | 120 kg | Avatu Opeloge | Samoa | 24 February 2024 | Oceania Junior & Youth Championships | Auckland, New Zealand | 19 years, 32 days | |
| Total | 215 kg | Maximina Uepa | Nauru | 2 August 2022 | Commonwealth Games | Marston Green, United Kingdom | 19 years, 314 days | |
81 kg
| Snatch | 110 kg | Eileen Cikamatana | Australia | 12 December 2019 | IWF World Cup | Tianjin, China | 20 years, 85 days | |
| Clean & Jerk | 150 kg | Eileen Cikamatana | Australia | 12 December 2019 | IWF World Cup | Tianjin, China | 20 years, 85 days | |
| Total | 260 kg | Eileen Cikamatana | Australia | 12 December 2019 | IWF World Cup | Tianjin, China | 20 years, 85 days | |
87 kg
| Snatch | 115 kg | Eileen Cikamatana | Australia | 10 November 2019 | IWF Grand Prix ODESUR CSLP | Lima, Peru | 20 years, 53 days | |
| Clean & Jerk | 151 kg | Eileen Cikamatana | Australia | 10 November 2019 | IWF Grand Prix ODESUR CSLP | Lima, Peru | 20 years, 53 days | |
| Total | 266 kg | Eileen Cikamatana | Australia | 10 November 2019 | IWF Grand Prix ODESUR CSLP | Lima, Peru | 20 years, 53 days | |
+87 kg
| Snatch | 124 kg | Feagaiga Stowers | Samoa | 8 June 2019 | Junior World Championships | Suva, Fiji | 18 years, 203 days | |
| Clean & Jerk | 152 kg | Charisma Amoe-Tarrant | Australia | 23 December 2019 | Qatar Cup | Doha, Qatar | 20 years, 211 days | |
| Total | 275 kg | Feagaiga Stowers | Samoa | 8 June 2019 | Junior World Championships | Suva, Fiji | 18 years, 203 days | |

=== Women (1998–2018) ===
| Event | Record | Athlete | Nation | Date | Meet | Place | Age | Ref |
–48 kg
| Snatch | 72 kg | Suzanne Hiram | Nauru | 10 August 2007 | SPG Final Trials | Apia, Samoa | 20 years, 0 days | |
| Clean & Jerk | 86 kg | Suzanne Hiram | Nauru | 27 July 2007 | | Apia, Samoa | 19 years, 351 days | |
| Total | 157 kg | Suzanne Hiram | Nauru | 10 August 2007 | SPG Final Trials | Apia, Samoa | 20 years, 0 days | |
–53 kg
| Snatch | 85 kg | Dika Toua | Papua New Guinea | 31 December 2004 | | Sigatoka, Fiji | 20 years, 191 days | |
| Clean & Jerk | 107 kg | Dika Toua | Papua New Guinea | 31 December 2004 | | Sigatoka, Fiji | 20 years, 191 days | |
| Total | 192 kg | Dika Toua | Papua New Guinea | 31 December 2004 | | Sigatoka, Fiji | 20 years, 191 days | |
–58 kg
| Snatch | 85 kg | Mattie Sasser | Marshall Islands | 25 May 2016 | Oceania Championships | Suva, Fiji | 19 years, 152 days | |
| Clean & Jerk | 114 kg OC | Mattie Sasser | Marshall Islands | 25 May 2016 | Oceania Championships | Suva, Fiji | 19 years, 152 days | |
| Total | 199 kg | Mattie Sasser | Marshall Islands | 25 May 2016 | Oceania Championships | Suva, Fiji | 19 years, 152 days | |
–63 kg
| Snatch | 95 kg | Kiana Elliott | Australia | 29 June 2016 | World Junior Championships | Tbilisi, Georgia | 18 years, 338 days | |
| Clean & Jerk | 110 kg | Sheba Deireragea | Nauru | 3 November 2001 | | Nauru | 15 years, 159 days | |
| Total | 204 kg | Kiana Elliott | Australia | 29 June 2016 | World Junior Championships | Tbilisi, Georgia | 18 years, 338 days | |
–69 kg
| Snatch | 93 kg | Eileen Cikamatana | Fiji | 26 May 2016 | Oceania Championships | Suva, Fiji | 16 years, 251 days | |
| Clean & Jerk | 122 kg | Eileen Cikamatana | Fiji | 24 October 2016 | Commonwealth Championships | Penang, Malaysia | 17 years, 36 days | |
| Total | 215 kg | Eileen Cikamatana | Fiji | 24 October 2016 | Commonwealth Championships | Penang, Malaysia | 17 years, 36 days | |
–75 kg
| Snatch | 105 kg | Mary Opeloge | Samoa | 11 May 2012 | President's Cup | Apia, Samoa | 20 years, 108 days | |
| Clean & Jerk | 132 kg | Mary Opeloge | Samoa | 11 May 2012 | President's Cup | Apia, Samoa | 20 years, 108 days | |
| Total | 237 kg | Mary Opeloge | Samoa | 11 May 2012 | President's Cup | Apia, Samoa | 20 years, 108 days | |
–90 kg
| Snatch | 111 kg OC | Eileen Cikamatana | Fiji | 24 September 2017 | Asian Indoor and Martial Arts Games | Ashgabat, Turkmenistan | 18 years, 6 days | |
| Clean & Jerk | 143 kg OC | Eileen Cikamatana | Fiji | 7 December 2017 | Pacific Mini Games | Port Vila, Vanuatu | 18 years, 80 days | |
| Total | 253 kg OC | Eileen Cikamatana | Fiji | 24 September 2017 | Asian Indoor and Martial Arts Games | Ashgabat, Turkmenistan | 18 years, 6 days | |
+90 kg
| Snatch | 107 kg | Mary Opeloge | Samoa | 6 October 2012 | New Zealand Championships | Auckland, New Zealand | 20 years, 256 days | |
| Clean & Jerk | 136 kg | Feagaiga Stowers | Samoa | 11 September 2017 | Oceania Junior Championships | Gold Coast, Australia | 16 years, 298 days | |
| Total | 243 kg | Feagaiga Stowers | Samoa | 11 September 2017 | Oceania Junior Championships | Gold Coast, Australia | 16 years, 298 days | |
