= Penal colony of New Caledonia =

French South Pacific colony (1864–1924)

- A prison warden, circa 1906
- Location: New Caledonia
- Type: Penal colony
- Inauguration date: May 9, 1864
- Dismantled date: 1924

The penal colony of New Caledonia was a penitentiary establishment which was in operation from 1864 to 1924 on the southwest Pacific islands of New Caledonia. Many French prisoners from mainland France (approximately 21,000) were deported there.

Divided into three categories, these convicts could hope to be released without obtaining a return to mainland France.

== The penal settlers ==
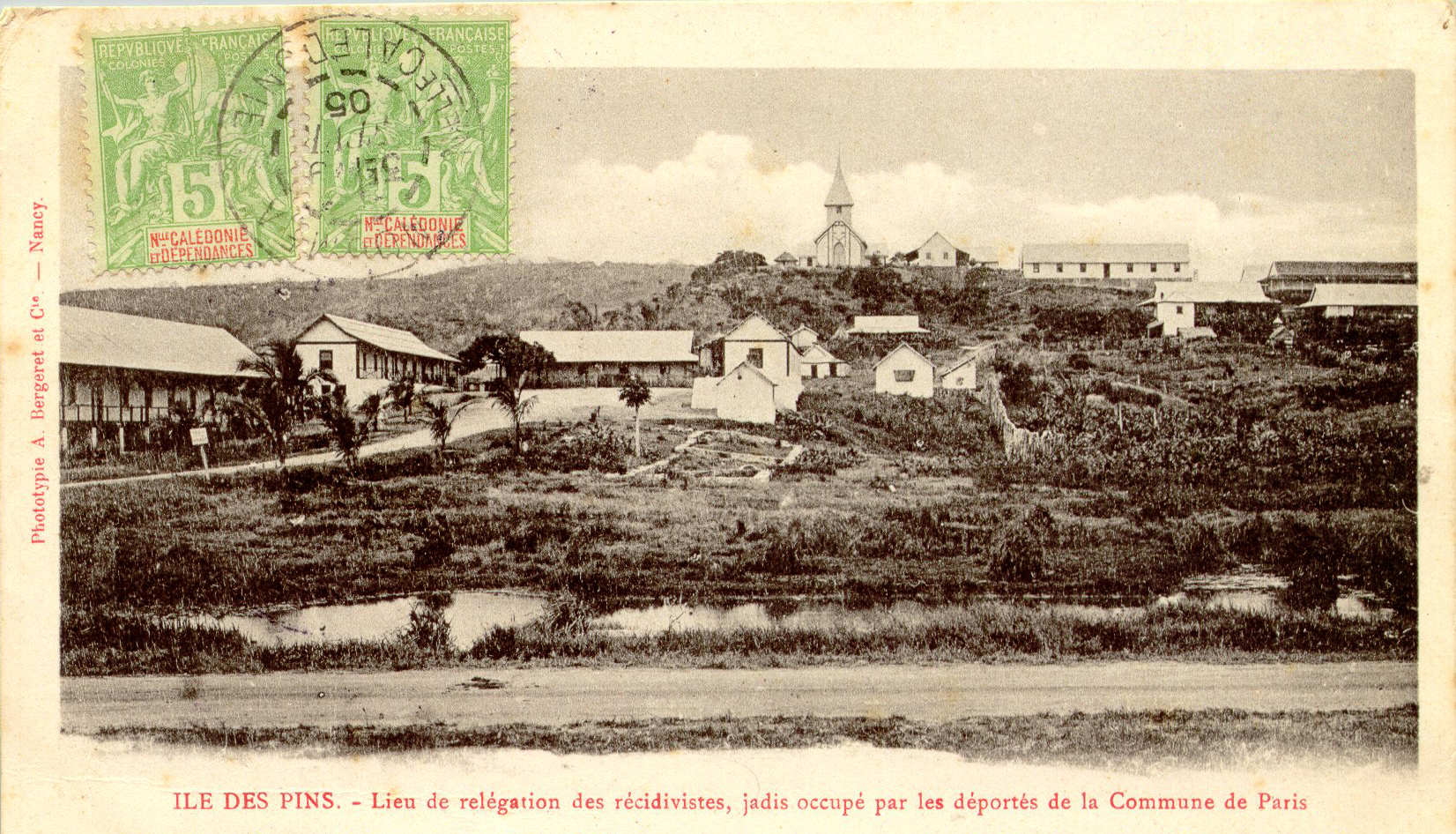
Original postcard representing the penal colony of the Isle of Pines in Ouro.

There were three types of convicts:

- the "Transported" (according to the French law of May 30, 1854 on colonial convictions): by far the most numerous, also called "slave" because sentenced to hard labor (8 years to life) for common law crimes (ranging from simple assault or indecent assault to murder), most of them were placed in the Île Nou penitentiary and were used for the construction of the roads and buildings of the colony, first of all the construction of the penitentiary-depot of the island, just in front of the capital renamed Nouméa, New Caledonia becoming a theater of experimentation of the social theory of the governor of New Caledonia Charles Guillain, more Saint-Simonian than Fourierist who wants rehabilitate the convict through work and give him a second life after his sentence by offering him land grants. The first 250 "Transportation workers" arrived in Port-de-France on May 9th, 1864 aboard L'Iphigénie. In all, 75 convoys will bring, between 1864 and 1897, around 21,630 registered in penal colony, according to Alain Saussol's estimates. Among the descendants of Transportés are families with the surnames, Bouteille, Bouteiller, Chatenay, Colomina, Delathière, Gervolino, Komornicki, Lafleur, Lucas, Mariotti, Pagès, Papon, Péré and Robelin. There were 1822 Maghrebian transportees between 1864 and 1897 (out of a total of 2166 condemned to transportation, deportation or relegation.).
- the "Deportees" (according to the French political deportation law of June 8, 1850): political convicts, mainly from participants in the Paris Commune of 1871, which means that the deportees are often called "Communards". 4,250 were sent from 1872 to the Île des Pins penitentiaries, or to the Ducos Peninsula (for those considered the most dangerous), with among them "celebrities" such as Louise Michel or Henri Rochefort. They obtained an amnesty in 1880 which authorized them to leave: fewer than 40 families decided to remain in the colony (the Armands, Bourdinat, Cacot, Courtot, Dolbeau; others, such as Adolphe Assi, Louis Boissier or Louis Roger, also remain but have no descendants). Also included in this category are the participants in the Mokrani revolt of 1871 in Algeria as well as the condemned of the successive insurrections of 1864 (south-Oran), 1876 (El Amri), 1879 (the Aurès), 1880-1882 (south Oran): there are several hundred "Algerians of the Pacific" most of whom, despite an amnesty in 1895, founded Caledonian lineages mainly installed in Nessadiou and Bourail (the Abdelkader, Aïfa, El Arbi, in particular). A small contingent of rebellious independence Tonkinese, guilty of a grenade attack at the Hanoi Hotel café in 1913, was deported in 1914. Among them, Ca-Lê Ngoc Lien and Phan Tuan Phong.
- the "Relegated" or repeat offenders, were also sentenced to penal colony from 1885 (Waldeck-Rousseau Law of May 27, 1885). There were a total of more than 3,300 men and 457 women relegated to "the News", especially to Isle of Pines, Prony or the Camp de la Ouaménie in Boulouparis.

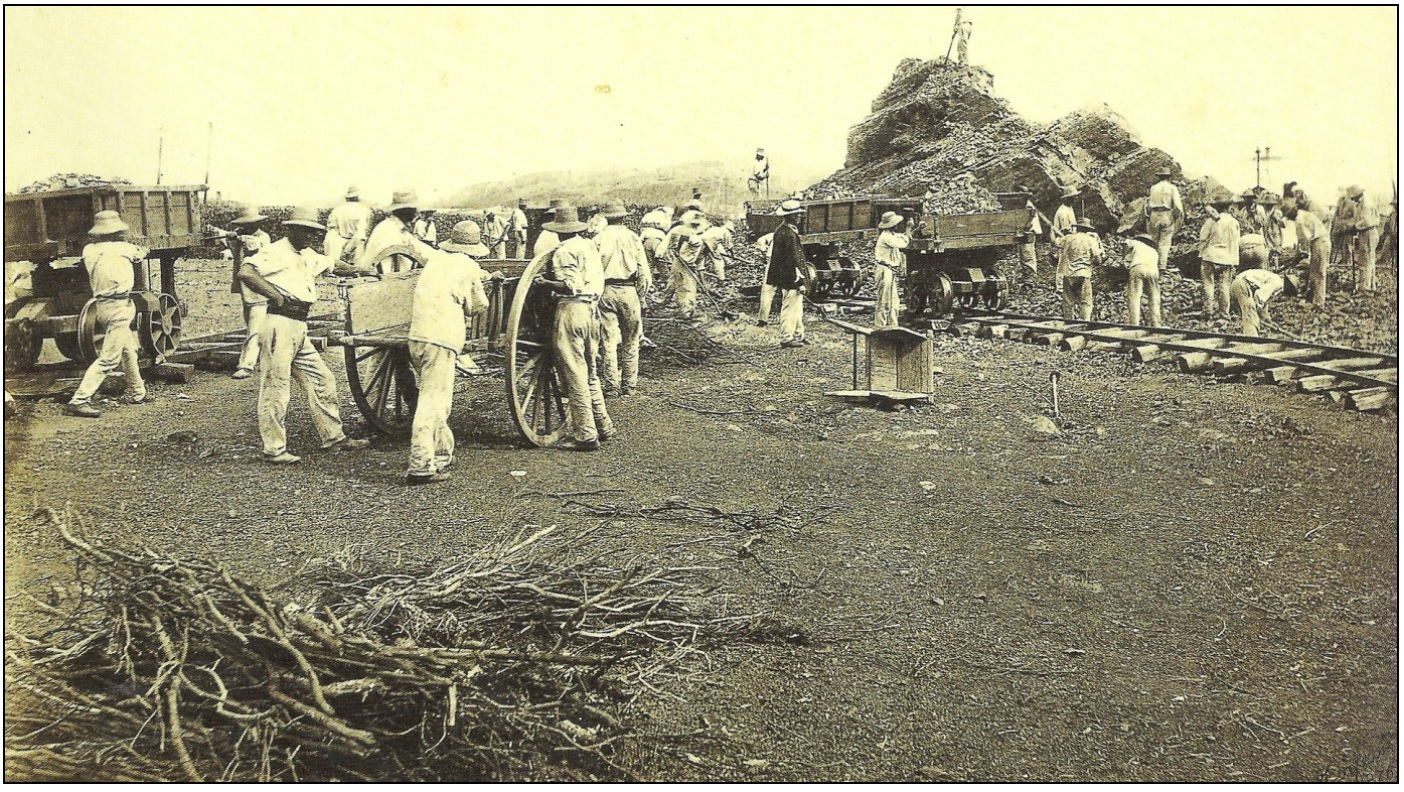
Convicts on a construction site in Nouméa, for the leveling of the Butte Conneau, around 1900.

Supervision was carried out by a large prison staff, up to 660 people, assisted by the native police.

The penal colony was transformed, in fact, into a subcontracting company of labor to administrations (public worksites), then to private companies (SLN, etc.). The rental income (after a loan phase) was allocated to the general budget, one third of which was collected by the Public Treasury, in the event of profits.

The number of criminals present in New Caledonia rose to 11,110 in 1877, i.e. 2/3 of the Europeans present in the colony, and in 1897, date of the cessation of the transported and relegated convoys, they were still 8,230.

== After hard labour ==
After hard labor, the convicts had to "double" their sentence by being placed in penitentiary farms and, once released, obtain land in penal concession. To do this, the prison administration acquired a large land estate, largely taken from indigenous lands, which at its peak reached 260,000 hectares. In all, the concessions definitively awarded to those released are estimated at around 1,300. The centers for the establishment of penal settlers were Bourail from 1867 (with some 460 concessions), La Foa-Farino (with the centers of Fonwhary, Focola, Ouraï, Farino and Tendéa) from 1876, Ouégoa after 1880 and Pouembout in 1883. The last penitentiary centers were closed in 1922 and 1931, but many descendants of "freed" remained settled on the concessions of their ancestors.

== The Communards ==
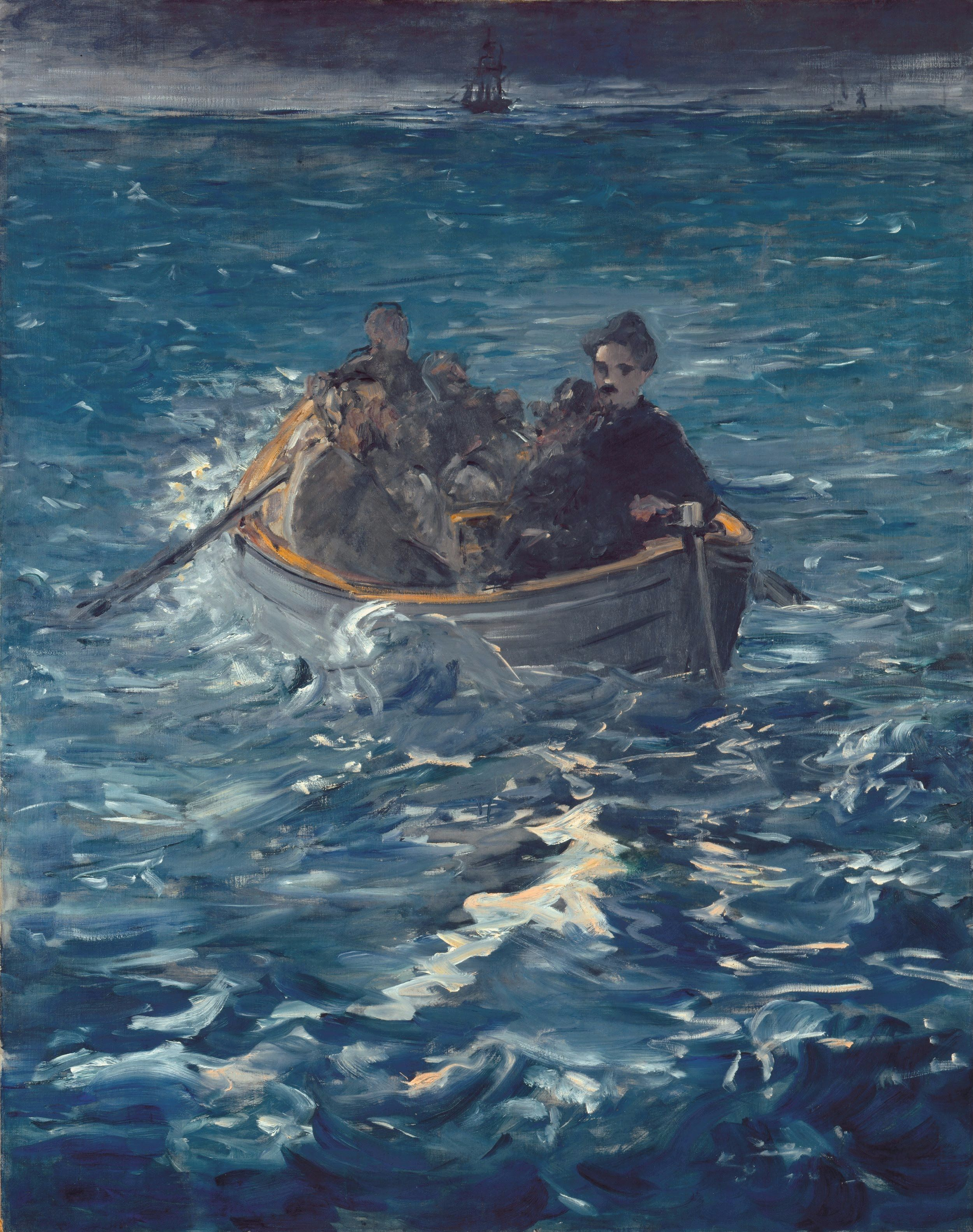
The Escape from Rochefort (Édouard Manet) 1881 143 × 114 cm. Kunsthaus, Zurich

From 1872 and until the amnesties of 1880, the insurgents of the Paris Commune were deported to New Caledonia in the penal colony, on the island of Nou for the convicts, on the peninsula of Ducos for the deported in enclosure fortified, or on the Isle of Pines for simple deportees, some of whom were allowed to stay in Nouméa. The insurgents of the Kabyle revolt of 1871 were also sent to the Isle of Pines.

During the revolt of 1878, the deportees were used by the colonial administration in the repression of the Kanaks (see Ataï).

Louise Michel, who obtained, during her deportation, a post of teacher in Nouméa, is one of the few to have taken an interest in Kanak culture and to oppose repression. While the Communards were granted an amnesty in 1880, most of the Algerians in the Pacific ended their lives in New Caledonia.

A short story entitled Jacques Damour, written by Émile Zola in 1880, evokes the penal colony. The same author also mentions it in Le Docteur Pascal (1893), when Pascal Rougon had his niece Clotilde detail the Rougon-Macquart genealogy, concerning Étienne Lantier:

Étienne Lantier, back in Paris after the Montsou strike, was later compromised in the insurrection of the Commune, whose ideas he had defended with passion, he had been condemned to death, then pardoned and deported, so that he was now in Nouméa; it was even said that he was immediately married there and that he had a child, without knowing exactly the sex

== Women prisoners ==
The Directorate of the colonies needing women to colonize the island, the penitentiary authority toured the central metropolitan prisons to encourage volunteers to go to New Caledonia. The first transport convoy of condemned women landed from Isis on January 23, 1870. Many were single and condemned to forced labor for infanticides, then, in insufficient number (192 from 1870 to 1887), women condemned to imprisonment (80) or imprisonment for simple offenses (250). They are lodged in Bourail in a convent run by the Sisters of Saint-Joseph de Cluny until their marriage to a freed land holder or a convict, their meetings being organized under the watchful eye of the nuns.

Only four marriages saw prisoners released from the penal colony marrying free women. The others married convicts who had been released or were still serving their sentence.

== The end of the penal colony ==
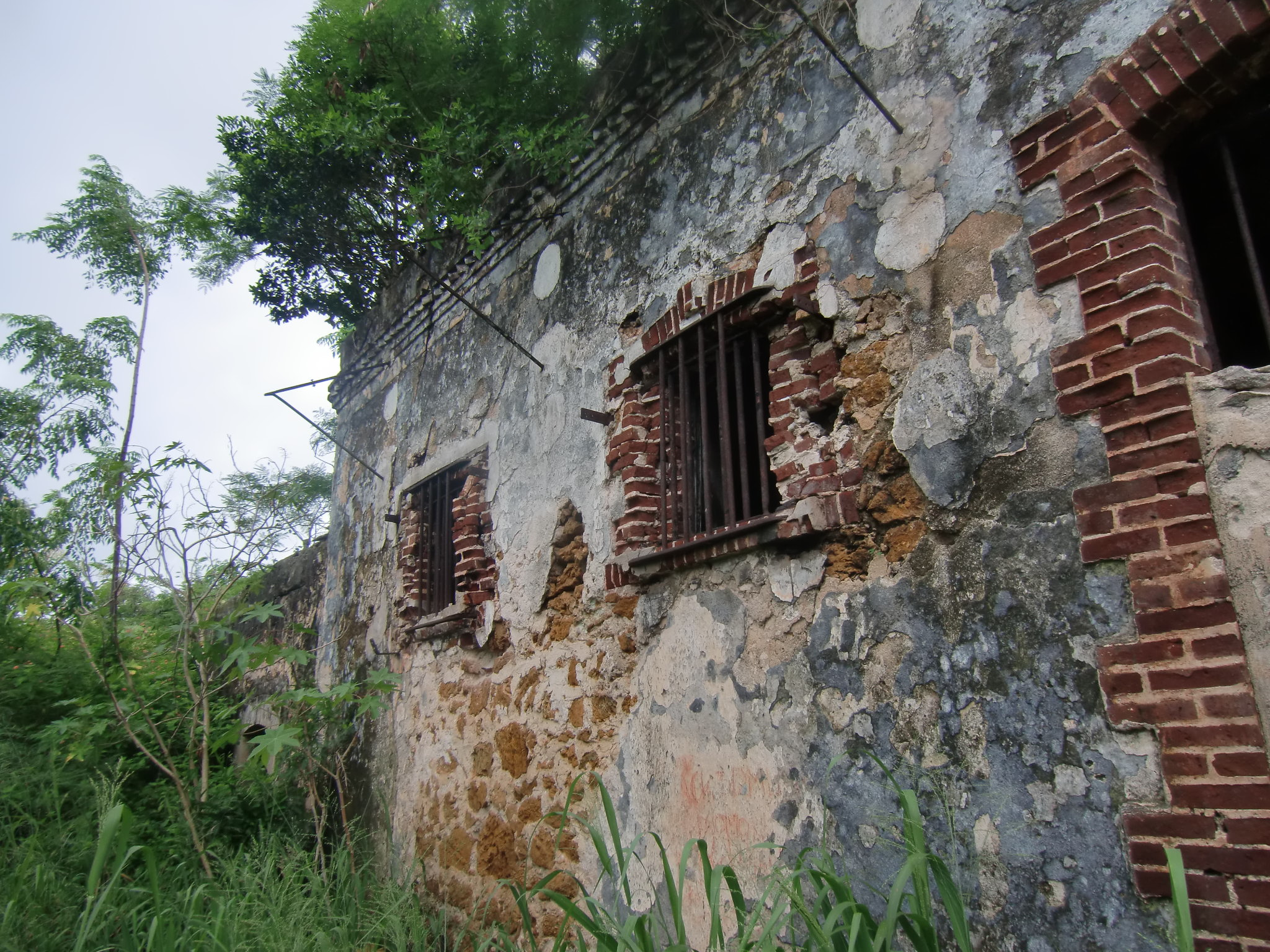
Ruins of the penal colony of the Isle of Pines

The presence of the penal colony was gradually contested by the colonists who suffered from competition from the labor of convicts but also from the penitentiary administration which monopolized the best land. A new governor appointed in 1894, Paul Feillet, declared himself against the "dirty water tap" that transportation constituted. It will be interrupted in 1897, but the prisoners of the penal colony will end their life there (in 1921, they were still 2,300). The last detainee was Cheikou Cissé, a tirailleur sentenced in 1919 to deportation for life, and died in Nouméa in 1933.

== Historiography, heritage and memory ==
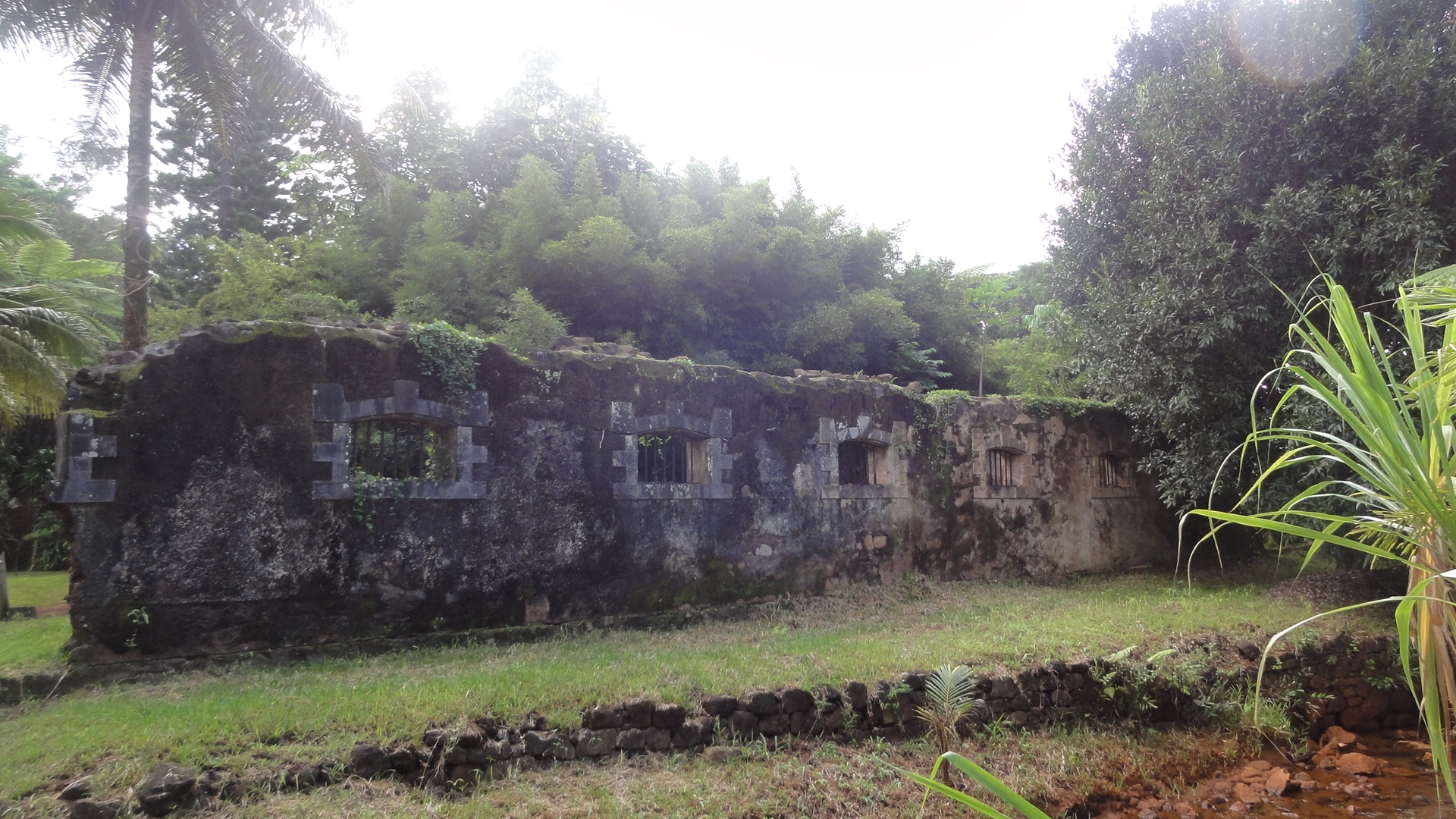
Remains of the penal colony in Prony

The question of the historical legacies of the colonial period began to be raised in the 1970s by a geographer from the "Montpellier school", a pupil of François Doumenge, Alain Saussol, through his work L'Héritage in 1979 which tackles the themes land spoliations, cantonment and studies the effects in this regard of settlement colonization, including criminal. Above all, from the same period, Louis-José Barbançon, a secondary school teacher and descendant of a convict, focused on historical research on the New Caledonian penal colony and penal colonization, fields hitherto neglected by historians, while multiplying the actions of popularization of this research and by carrying out in parallel political activities marked by the defense of a pluriethnic identity or even of a form of Caledonian nationalism. He obtained his doctorate in history from the University of Versailles-Saint-Quentin-en-Yvelines, under the supervision of Jean-Yves Mollier, with a thesis on colonial representations of the prison entitled "Between chains and the earth. The evolution of the idea of deportation in the 19th century in France, to the origins of colonization in New Caledonia". It was published in 2003 under the title: L’Archipel des convats. History of the New Caledonian penal colony (1863-1931). Mainly, in Le Pays du non-dit in 1991, he highlights the process of forgetting long installed in local collective memory, making penal colony one of the many "taboos" of New Caledonian history and regretting: " Young Caledonians know nothing about real colonization, burnt down huts, despoiled land, forced labor, displaced Kanaks; colonization has always been presented to them in its civilizing aspects: hygiene, health, education, technology ... Even today, out of stupidity or pride, when we speak of the first Caledonians, we use the rewarding term of "pioneers", voluntarily forgetting that the majority of them were forced settlers". Another New Caledonian historian, Christiane Terrier, while qualifying the strong majority aspect of penal colonization compared to free colonization as defended by Barbançon, also recognizes this oversight: "Until the Matignon agreements (1988), history, located at the heart of political issues, had bad press ... Since the Matignon agreements, minds have evolved in the direction of ever greater interest and openness, but the interpretation of history remains a fundamental issue insofar as it directly influences our understanding of the present".

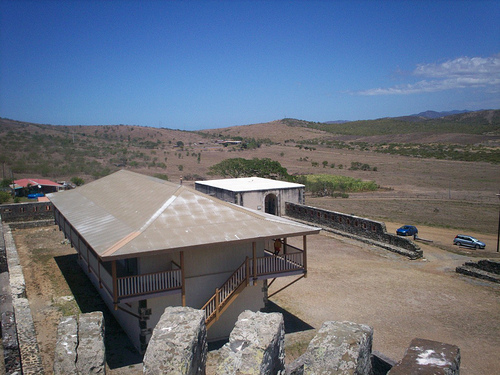
Fort Teremba near Moindou.

In connection with this long neglect by the historiography of colonial history in general and that of penal colonization in particular, the vestiges of the penal colony remained for a long time, for some until the 2010s, neglected by the public authorities or else reused without enhancing their heritage aspect. Many were subsequently taken over by vegetation (the most notable example being that of the old Prony camp). The association "Witness of a past" (ATUP) was thus created in 1975 with the aim of promoting the preservation of heritage inherited from the colonial period (colonial houses, former penitentiary centers, etc.) and allowing the creation of museums, including one for the penal colony at Nouville. From the 1990s, the Southern Province set up guided tour services by Alain Fort coupled with hikes, mainly in Nouville and the village of Prony in the Great South. In 1998, the city of Nouméa bought and rehabilitated the former food store in Nouville penal colony to make it the Théâtre de l'Île. Not far away, the department of law, economics and management of the University of New Caledonia is located in the former prison workshops. The convict past in Nouville also remains present through the prison chapel built in 1882, the convict dormitories (dormitory huts about 20 meters long in which 80 convicts are piled up) aligned along an alley called ironically the Boulevard du crime and higher up the barracks of military guards. Between La Foa and Moindou, the "Marguerite" Association, in connection with the communities, has rehabilitated Fort Teremba where reconstructions and sounds and lights are organized. In 2013, the Southern Province launched a program to rescue, protect and enhance the remains of the Isle of Pines (invaded by vegetation), from the capture of Anse N'Du to Ducos (Nouméa) in link with the Institute of Archeology of New Caledonia and the Pacific (IANCP) and the In Memoriam associations of historian Stéphane Pannoux. In 2020, an interpretation center dedicated to the penal colony in New Caledonia will be open to the public in the restored former bakery of Nouville (which can already be visited, by reservation) by the association "Testimony of a past".

== See also ==
- Penal colony, Forced labor
- Deportation under French law, Déportation
- Other establishments in the New Caledonian penal colony ː Isle of Pines, Camp Brun
- Algerians from New Caledonia
- Penal transportation
- Convicts in Australia (among 165,000 between 1788 and 1868)
  - Convicts of the First Fleet

== Bibliography ==
- Pierre, Michel (1989). The Last Exile: History of penal colony and convicts (in French). Paris: Gallimard. ISBN 978-2-07-053089-2.
- Michel Pierre, The time of the penal colony, 1748-1953, Tallandier, 2017.
- Grousset, Paschal; Francis Jourde; Henri Brissac (2009). Le Bagne en Nouvelle-Calédonie... l'enfer au Paradis (1872-1880). Footprint Pacifique. p. 179. ISBN 978-2-908186-30-7.
- Daufelt, Jean-Baptiste (1974). The Damned of the Pacific. Kiwanis Club of Nouméa. p. 169.
- Fougère, Éric (2002). The ledger of the penal colony in Guyana and New Caledonia (in French). Sainte-Clotilde: Orphie. p. 256. ISBN 2-87763-150-8.
- Barbançon, Louis-José (2003). The convict archipelago: history of the New Caledonian prison, 1863-1931 (in French). Villeneuve-d'Ascq: University Press of the Septentrion. p. 447. ISBN 2-85939-785-X.
- Lacourrège, Gérard; Alibert, Pierre (1998). New Caledonia: In the days of the penal colony (in French). Paris: Atlas. p. 208. ISBN 2-7312-0499-0.
- Among the deportees, Maxime Lisbonne (The penal colony tavern)
- Sanchez, Jean-Lucien (2019). Boucheron, Patrick; Delalande, Nicolas; Mazel Florian; Potin Yann; Singaravélou, Pierre (eds.). 1852. Penal Colonization. New York: Other Press.
