= Moindou Bay =

Bay in New Caledonia, France

Coordinates: 21°44′8″S 165°39′40″E

Moindou Bay or Baie Moundou is a bay in southwestern New Caledonia. It lies 50 km north of Saint Vincent Bay.Teremba Bay lies to the east and the town of Moindou just to the north.
