= Fort Teremba =

Former prison in New Caledonia

- Part of New Caledonia
- Moindou, New Caledonia
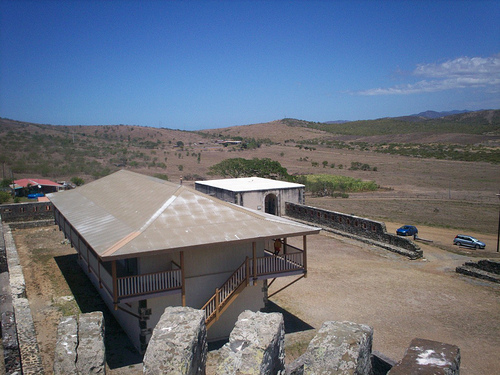
- View from the top of the fort

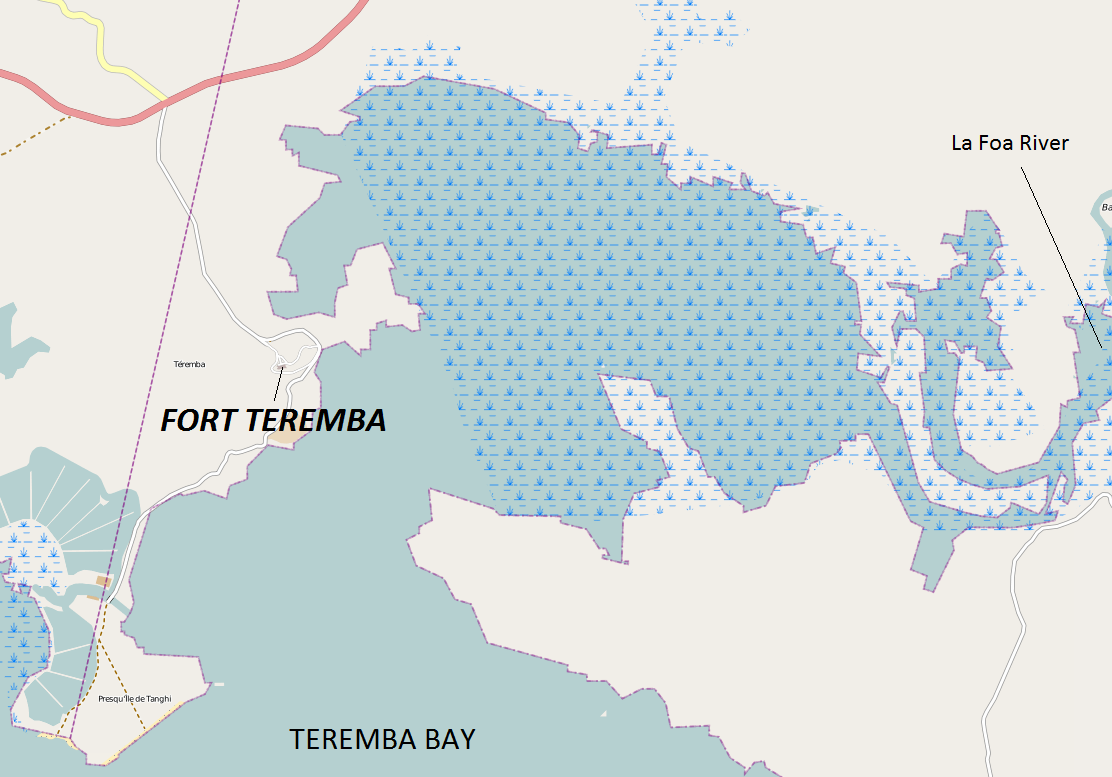
- Location Map of Fort Teremba opposite to Teremba Bay

Site information
- Type: Fort and Prison
- Open to the public: Yes
- Condition: Restored

Location
- Location of Fort Teremba in New Caledonia
- Coordinates: 21°43′43″S 165°42′56″E

Site history
- Built: 1871
- In use: Yes
- Materials: Stones and Bricks
- Demolished: No
- Events: Revolt of 1878

Fort Teremba is a former fort and a prison located near Moindou in New Caledonia, which came to be set up to house prisoners and the supervisory staff. The prisoners were brought to build road network Canala-Bourail-Boulouparis. It overlooks Teremba Bay (Uarai Bay), opposite the mouth of the La Foa River, 124 kilometres north of Noumea.

The fort was further strengthened following 1878 Kanak revolt, when they had besieged the prison. The fort was closed in 1898.

== History ==
The construction of a military fort and a prison along the Bay Uarai began in 1871 at the request of the Governor Eugène Gaultier de la Richerie and sent a contingent of twenty-five convicts, with two supervisors and three policemen. The fort was built by the convict labour. The camp was renamed Fort Téremba by reference to the island Téremba which is in the middle of the bay. A small town was set around the camp, with a registry office, a library, a church, a school, post office, a telegraph, a market place and a wharf. After construction of the fort, while men were incarcerated at the newly built Fort Teremba, women prisoners were kept at a prison at Fonwhary (also Panwhary) 6 km away to the north of La Foa. At a time, the prison housed 200 prisoners in the shacks (built with "cob stones") outside the fort walls, who were engaged in building roads, bridges and buildings.

The Kanak revolt started at La Foa, the "gendarmes" inside the fort were killed, and the revolt spread further south. However, the fort was never taken and at the time it was still in very good condition. After the revolt of 1878, the military fort was redesigned and strengthened to serve as bunkers and possible refuge. To counter the power of the colonial administration, the governor Pallu de la Barrière subsequently decided to employ the convicts in the construction of roads and infrastructure. In 1885, the fort came under the control of the prison administration. However, the fort was abandoned in 1897–98 as deportations came to an end.

By 1906, the fort had fallen into neglect; one author commenting in this year talked of the "repulsive-looking barracks, so grim and grotesque, and smelling so damp and fusty". Having long been neglected, Fort Téremba was finally restored by the action of the local Association Marguerite in 1984 who have set up the "Heritage Interpretation Center, and military prison in New Caledonia" spread over 11 ha site. The municipality have bought the site in 1987. The main building was reconstructed and houses a permanent exhibition on the history of the fort. The watchtower, a high stone wall and a guillotine are moot witness to the history of the fort. The circular tower of the fort provides nice vistas of Teremba Bay and the neighbourhood. The fort is approached from RT1 road, 14 km west of La Foa and then along a path of about 3 km to reach the fort.

In 1989 the site was classified as a historical monument. Every year, a light and sound show depicting scenes of life at the time, attracted a wide audience. The theme of the show presented for two hours is on the history of fort, the prison and the Kanak revolt, which is enacted by 180 artists (of various historical figures) which is concluded with a very impressive display of fireworks in the backdrop of the fort.

== Gallery ==
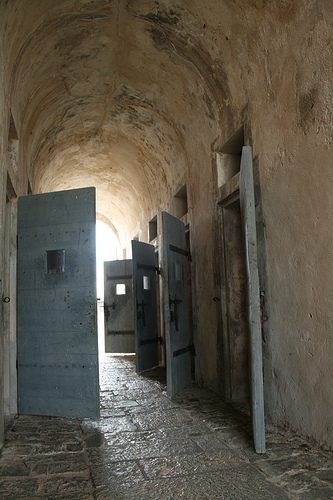
Barracks in Fort Teremba
