= List of Nauruan records in Olympic weightlifting =

The following are the national records in Olympic weightlifting in Nauru. Records are maintained in each weight class for the snatch lift, clean and jerk lift, and the total for both lifts by the Nauru Weightlifting Federation.

== Current records ==
=== Men ===
Event	Record	Athlete	Date	Meet	Place	Ref
60 kg
Snatch	102 kg	Shadrach Cain	2 July 2025	Pacific Mini Games	Meyuns, Palau	
Clean & Jerk	133 kg	Johannes Adam	27 April 2026	Oceania Championships	Apia, Samoa	
Total	233 kg	Johannes Adam	27 April 2026	Oceania Championships	Apia, Samoa	
65 kg
Snatch	116 kg	Ditto Ika	2 July 2025	Pacific Mini Games	Meyuns, Palau	
Clean & Jerk	152 kg	Ditto Ika	2 July 2025	Pacific Mini Games	Meyuns, Palau	
Total	268 kg	Ditto Ika	2 July 2025	Pacific Mini Games	Meyuns, Palau	
71 kg
Snatch	140 kg	Ezekiel Moses	27 July 2026	Commonwealth Games	Glasgow, United Kingdom	
Clean & Jerk	170 kg	Ezekiel Moses	27 July 2026	Commonwealth Games	Glasgow, United Kingdom	
Total	310 kg	Ezekiel Moses	27 July 2026	Commonwealth Games	Glasgow, United Kingdom	
75 kg
Snatch	140 kg	Ezekiel Moses	30 October 2026	World Championships	Ningbo, China	
Clean & Jerk	170 kg	Ezekiel Moses	30 October 2026	World Championships	Ningbo, China	
Total	310 kg	Ezekiel Moses	30 October 2026	World Championships	Ningbo, China	
85 kg
Snatch						
Clean & Jerk						
Total						
94 kg
Snatch	138 kg	Uea Detudamo	4 July 2025	Pacific Mini Games	Meyuns, Palau	
Clean & Jerk	165 kg	Uea Detudamo	4 July 2025	Pacific Mini Games	Meyuns, Palau	
Total	303 kg	Uea Detudamo	4 July 2025	Pacific Mini Games	Meyuns, Palau	
110 kg
Snatch						
Clean & Jerk						
Total						
+110 kg
Snatch	134 kg	Marcquinz Cook	2 May 2026	Oceania Championships	Apia, Samoa	
Clean & Jerk	171 kg	Marcquinz Cook	2 May 2026	Oceania Championships	Apia, Samoa	
Total	305 kg	Marcquinz Cook	2 May 2026	Oceania Championships	Apia, Samoa	

=== Women ===
Event	Record	Athlete	Date	Meet	Place	Ref
48 kg
Snatch	71 kg	Jo-beth Deireragea	27 April 2026	Oceania Championships	Apia, Samoa	
Clean & Jerk	91 kg	Jo-beth Deireragea	26 July 2026	Commonwealth Games	Glasgow, United Kingdom	
Total	161 kg	Jo-beth Deireragea	26 July 2026	Commonwealth Games	Glasgow, United Kingdom	
53 kg
Snatch	61 kg	Oszajca Kakiouea	2 July 2025	Pacific Mini Games	Meyuns, Palau	
Clean & Jerk	73 kg	Oszajca Kakiouea	2 July 2025	Pacific Mini Games	Meyuns, Palau	
Total	134 kg	Oszajca Kakiouea	2 July 2025	Pacific Mini Games	Meyuns, Palau	
58 kg
Snatch	70 kg	My-Only Stephen	29 April 2026	Oceania Championships	Apia, Samoa	
Clean & Jerk	90 kg	My-Only Stephen	29 April 2026	Oceania Championships	Apia, Samoa	
Total	160 kg	My-Only Stephen	29 April 2026	Oceania Championships	Apia, Samoa	
63 kg
Snatch	101 kg	Femily-Crystie Notte	29 April 2026	Oceania Championships	Apia, Samoa	
Clean & Jerk	123 kg	Femily-Crystie Notte	29 April 2026	Oceania Championships	Apia, Samoa	
Total	224 kg	Femily-Crystie Notte	29 April 2026	Oceania Championships	Apia, Samoa	
69 kg
Snatch	55 kg	Siva Elgiva Teimitsi	30 April 2026	Oceania Championships	Apia, Samoa	
Clean & Jerk	60 kg	Siva Elgiva Teimitsi	30 April 2026	Oceania Championships	Apia, Samoa	
Total	115 kg	Siva Elgiva Teimitsi	30 April 2026	Oceania Championships	Apia, Samoa	
77 kg
Snatch						
Clean & Jerk						
Total						
86 kg
Snatch	73 kg	Julyna Rose	4 July 2025	Pacific Mini Games	Meyuns, Palau	
Clean & Jerk	90 kg	Julyna Rose	4 July 2025	Pacific Mini Games	Meyuns, Palau	
Total	163 kg	Julyna Rose	4 July 2025	Pacific Mini Games	Meyuns, Palau	
+86 kg
Snatch						
Clean & Jerk						
Total						

== Historical records ==
=== Men (2018–2025) ===
Event	Record	Athlete	Date	Meet	Place	Ref
55 kg
Snatch	93 kg	Elson Brechtefeld	9 July 2019	Pacific Games	Apia, Samoa	
Clean & Jerk	122 kg	Elson Brechtefeld	9 July 2019	Pacific Games	Apia, Samoa	
Total	215 kg	Elson Brechtefeld	9 July 2019	Pacific Games	Apia, Samoa	
61 kg
Snatch	100 kg	Johannes Adam	1 May 2025	World Junior Championships	Lima, Peru	
Clean & Jerk	128 kg	Johannes Adam	1 May 2025	World Junior Championships	Lima, Peru	
Total	228 kg	Johannes Adam	1 May 2025	World Junior Championships	Lima, Peru	
67 kg
Snatch	115 kg	Ezekiel Moses	July 2019	Pacific Games	Apia, Samoa	
Clean & Jerk	154 kg	Ditto Titus Ika	6 October 2023	Oceania Junior & Youth Championships	Apia, Samoa	
Total	269 kg	Ditto Titus Ika	6 October 2023	Oceania Junior & Youth Championships	Apia, Samoa	
73 kg
Snatch	130 kg	Ezekiel Moses	31 July 2022	Commonwealth Games	Marston Green, Great Britain	
Clean & Jerk	163 kg	Larko Doguape	29 February 2020	Australian Open	Canberra, Australia	
Total	289 kg	Ezekiel Moses	29 February 2020	Australian Open	Canberra, Australia	
81 kg
Snatch	120 kg	Larko Doguape	September 2021	Oceania Championships		
Clean & Jerk	155 kg	Larko Doguape	September 2021	Oceania Championships		
Total	275 kg	Larko Doguape	September 2021	Oceania Championships		
89 kg
Snatch	120 kg	Uea Detudamo	September 2021	Oceania Championships		
Clean & Jerk	152 kg	Uea Detudamo	September 2021	Oceania Championships		
Total	272 kg	Uea Detudamo	September 2021	Oceania Championships		
96 kg
Snatch	134 kg	Uea Detudamo	23 November 2023	Pacific Games	Honiara, Solomon Islands	
Clean & Jerk	165 kg	Uea Detudamo	23 November 2023	Pacific Games	Honiara, Solomon Islands	
Total	298 kg	Uea Detudamo	23 November 2023	Pacific Games	Honiara, Solomon Islands	
102 kg
Snatch						
Clean & Jerk						
Total						
109 kg
Snatch						
Clean & Jerk						
Total						
+109 kg
Snatch						
Clean & Jerk						
Total						

=== Women (2018–2025) ===
Event	Record	Athlete	Date	Meet	Place	Ref
45 kg
Snatch	35 kg	Daniella Ika	9 July 2019	Pacific Games	Apia, Samoa	
Clean & Jerk	47 kg	Daniella Ika	9 July 2019	Pacific Games	Apia, Samoa	
Total	82 kg	Daniella Ika	9 July 2019	Pacific Games	Apia, Samoa	
49 kg
Snatch	63 kg	Jo-Beth Deireragea	1 May 2025	World Youth Championships	Lima, Peru	
Clean & Jerk	77 kg	Jo-Beth Deireragea	1 May 2025	World Youth Championships	Lima, Peru	
Total	114 kg	Jo-Beth Deireragea	1 May 2025	World Youth Championships	Lima, Peru	
55 kg
Snatch	72 kg	My-Only Stephen	20 November 2023	Pacific Games	Honiara, Solomon Islands	
Clean & Jerk	93 kg	My-Only Stephen	20 November 2023	Pacific Games	Honiara, Solomon Islands	
Total	165 kg	My-Only Stephen	20 November 2023	Pacific Games	Honiara, Solomon Islands	
59 kg
Snatch	72 kg	My-Only Stephen	28 May 2022		Nauru	
Clean & Jerk	92 kg	My-Only Stephen	28 May 2022		Nauru	
Total	164 kg	My-Only Stephen	28 May 2022		Nauru	
64 kg
Snatch	92 kg	Femily-Crystie Notte	2 May 2025	World Youth Championships	Lima, Peru	
Clean & Jerk	115 kg	Femily-Crystie Notte	23 February 2024	Oceania Junior & Youth Championships	Auckland, New Zealand	
Total	205 kg	Femily-Crystie Notte	23 February 2024	Oceania Junior & Youth Championships	Auckland, New Zealand	
71 kg
Snatch	95 kg	Maximina Uepa	7 April 2024	World Cup	Phuket, Thailand	
Clean & Jerk	117 kg	Maximina Uepa	22 November 2023	Pacific Games	Honiara, Solomon Islands	
Total	205 kg	Maximina Uepa	22 November 2023	Pacific Games	Honiara, Solomon Islands	
76 kg
Snatch	96 kg	Maximina Uepa	2 August 2022	Commonwealth Games	Marston Green, United Kingdom	
Clean & Jerk	119 kg	Maximina Uepa	2 August 2022	Commonwealth Games	Marston Green, United Kingdom	
Total	215 kg	Maximina Uepa	2 August 2022	Commonwealth Games	Marston Green, United Kingdom	
81 kg
Snatch	71 kg	Ariana Uepa	July 2019	Pacific Games	Apia, Samoa	
Clean & Jerk	91 kg	Ariana Uepa	July 2019	Pacific Games	Apia, Samoa	
Total	162 kg	Ariana Uepa	July 2019	Pacific Games	Apia, Samoa	
87 kg
Snatch	71 kg	Julyna Yvonne Rose	5 May 2025	World Junior Championships	Lima, Peru	
Clean & Jerk	93 kg	Roviel Detenamo	July 2019	Pacific Games	Apia, Samoa	
Total	159 kg	Julyna Yvonne Rose	5 May 2025	World Junior Championships	Lima, Peru	
+87 kg
Snatch						
Clean & Jerk						
Total						

=== Men (1998–2018) ===
Event	Record	Athlete	Date	Meet	Place	Ref
56 kg
Snatch	104 kg	Elson Brechtefield	5 December 2017	Pacific Mini Games	Port Vila, Vanuatu	
Clean and jerk	130 kg	Elson Brechtefield	5 April 2018	Commonwealth Games	Gold Coast, Australia	
Total	232 kg	Elson Brechtefield	5 December 2017	Pacific Mini Games	Port Vila, Vanuatu	
62 kg
Snatch						
Clean & Jerk	172	Marcus Stephen	23 November 1999	World Championships	Athens, Greece	
Total	300	Marcus Stephen	23 November 1999	World Championships	Athens, Greece	
69 kg
Snatch	135 kg	Yukio Peter	18 August 2004	Olympic Games	Athens, Greece	
Clean & Jerk	175 kg	Marcus Stephen	6 November 1999		Nauru	
Total	302 kg	Yukio Peter	6 May 2004	Oceania Championships	Suva, Fiji	
77 kg
Snatch	157 kg	Yukio Peter	12 May 2011	Oceania Championships	Darwin, Australia	
Clean and jerk	196 kg	Yukio Peter	14 May 2009	Oceania Championships	Darwin, Australia	
Total	350 kg	Yukio Peter	9 September 2005		Sigatoka, Fiji	
85 kg
Snatch	160 kg					
Clean and jerk	200 kg					
Total	360 kg					
94 kg
Snatch						
Clean and jerk	200 kg					
Total	352 kg					
105 kg
Snatch						
Clean and jerk						
Total	353 kg					
+105 kg
Snatch	184 kg	Itte Detenamo	13 May 2011	Oceania Championships	Darwin, Australia	
Clean and jerk	229 kg	Itte Detenamo	13 May 2011	Oceania Championships	Darwin, Australia	
Total	413 kg	Itte Detenamo	13 May 2011	Oceania Championships	Darwin, Australia	

=== Women (1998–2018) ===
Event	Record	Athlete	Date	Meet	Place	Ref
48 kg
Snatch	72 kg					
Clean and jerk	86 kg					
Total	157 kg					
53 kg
Snatch						
Clean and jerk						
Total						
58 kg
Snatch						
Clean and jerk	82 kg	Bernada Uepa	5 December 2017	Pacific Mini Games	Port Vila, Vanuatu	
Total						
63 kg
Snatch	85 kg					
Clean and jerk	95 kg	Maximina Uepa	5 December 2017	Pacific Mini Games	Port Vila, Vanuatu	
Total	170 kg	Maximina Uepa	7 April 2018	Commonwealth Games	Gold Coast, Australia	
69 kg
Snatch	90 kg					
Clean and jerk						
Total	200 kg					
75 kg
Snatch						
Clean and jerk						
Total						
90 kg
Snatch						
Clean and jerk						
Total						
+90 kg
Snatch	101 kg	Charisma Amoe-Tarrant	9 April 2018	Commonwealth Games	Gold Coast, Australia	
Clean and jerk	142 kg	Charisma Amoe-Tarrant	9 April 2018	Commonwealth Games	Gold Coast, Australia	
Total	243 kg	Charisma Amoe-Tarrant	9 April 2018	Commonwealth Games	Gold Coast, Australia	
