= 1878 Kanak revolt =

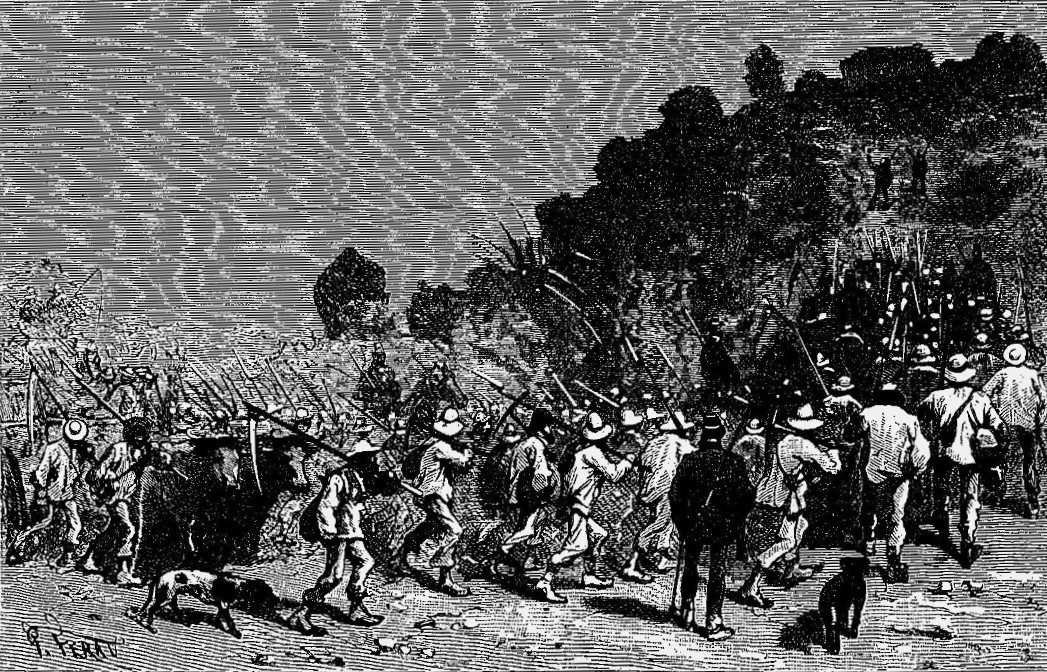
- A French military column led by Henri Riviére marching against the Kanaks (illustration by J. Férat, 1881)
Date	25 June – December, 1878
Location	New Caledonia
Result	Revolt suppressed

Belligerents
France	United Kanak chiefdoms

Commanders and leaders
(France) Henri Rivière (France) Leopold von Pritzbuer (France) Jean Baptiste Léon Olry (France) Col. François Gally-Passebosc † (France) Lt. Senan	Ataï (executed); Baptiste †; Cavio; Dionno; Bouarate; Watton; Poindi-Patchili; Kaké (surrendered); Gélina (surrendered)

Strength
3,082 soldiers (1877 census)	500–3,000 rebels (estimate)

Casualties and losses
~200 French people killed	~600 Kanak insurgents killed 1000–1500 Kanaks deported

The Great Kanak Revolt of 1878 is the term commonly used to describe the insurrection of the Kanak people in 1878 in New Caledonia, with the iconic figure of the great chief of Komalé, Ataï. The Kanaks refer to it as the War of Ataï.

== Colonial context ==
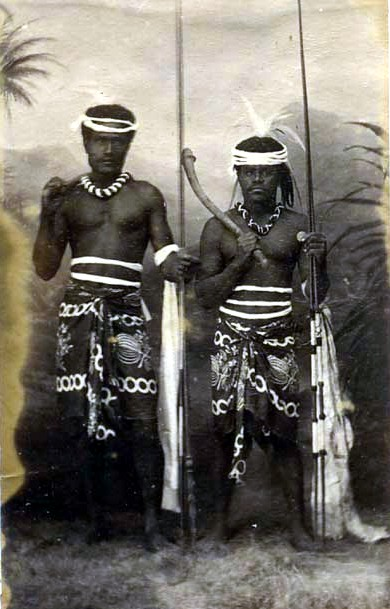
Kanak warriors, c. 1880

After the discovery by Europeans in 1774, and until 1853, New Caledonia was frequented by numerous adventurers, beachcombers, "strike beaters," "beach rakers," or simply whaling ships, without any significant settlement other than Christian missionaries. Some sandalwood traders reportedly settled as early as 1841 in Canala.

There exists a treaty of cession, dated 1 January 1844, between France and the kings and chiefs of Opao, in the Balade region, for the cession of their lands, but this only covers a small part of New Caledonia. This is far from the founding act of New Zealand, the Treaty of Waitangi (1840), by the United Tribes of New Zealand (1835-1840), (Māori). There is no Protector of Aborigines as in Australia.

In 1853, New Caledonia was proclaimed a French colony, with a conquest legislation favoring alliances and opposing resistance. Customary oppositions, rivalries, resentments, and inter-tribal dissensions were sometimes welcomed. By 1858, apart from the merchants of Port-de-France (Nouméa), there were only about a hundred active civilians in Nouméa, Canala, and Tiwaka. Colonization was both penal (transported, deported, or relegated) and free (unorganized, then organized).

From 1853 to 1868, the French administration faced frequent but localized uprisings, with Dousset-Leenhardt's book providing a chronology from 1843 to 1870. These 25 revolts nearly ended colonization. In 1855, the colonial administration decided to grant land through public auctions to encourage settlement. This became effective, though scattered, in 1858. By his declaration No. 18, Governor Eugène du Bouzet canceled all previous contracts and declared all land in New Caledonia as property of the French government. Unoccupied land (by Melanesians), often fallow, was declared state property. Settlement remained limited, near strongholds reputed to ensure security if needed. These dispossessions still had a limited impact around Nouméa.

European advances were not without resistance. The great chief Bouarate (Bwharat) of Hienghène (1815c-1873), after the attack on the Pouébo Mission (9 September 1857), was arrested and exiled to Tahiti in 1857, then recalled in 1863. In 1858, the Great Chief Kuindo (Kwindo Aliki Kaï) of the Kambwa Wecho Pweyta chiefdom in Païta, and thus of the greater southwest region (including Nouméa), was condemned and executed by his tribe for allying with the French and selling land to the Vial Company. By 1868, the pacification of Grande Terre seemed accomplished. The death of Chief Gondou Poala, or Goodu or N'endé, in 1869 appeared to confirm this. Other figures in French accounts were also nearing their end: Mouéaou (Hienghène, 1862, brother of exiled Bouarate), Kahoua (Poyes, 1875), Poindi Pacili (1888, exiled to Obock).

The geologist Jules Garnier declared in 1862: "It is fortunate that the natives occasionally make some escapades, for their confiscated lands immediately swell public wealth and serve the settlers."

In 1867, without much concern for clan functioning, an administrative decree created, or applied, the notion of tribe, to assert the collective responsibility of inhabitants of the same physical space in case of wrongdoing. "Each represents a collective moral entity, administratively and civilly responsible for attacks committed on its territory, whether against persons or property." This also established chiefdoms, with "petty chiefs" and "great chiefs."

In 1868, the colonial administration required Melanesians to "regroup in territories delimited for this purpose, the reserves." "The 1868 decree specifies that indigenous property cannot be leased, sold, or given away." In 1876, a decree specified that the tribe remains "as much as possible on the Territory it traditionally enjoys." These Kanak reserves meant dispossession, destabilization, and protection of Melanesians. The delimited areas were gradually fixed.

The pioneer front of land grabbing moved north from Nouméa, with the state reserving "ownership of mines, minerals, watercourses of all kinds, and springs," as well as the coastal strip, and the perpetual right of expropriation. In 1871, the administration created the occupation permit for state lands to avoid waiting for all delimitations to be established. In practice, settlers were allowed to delimit their own concessions, and native reserves shrank, except for the Loyalty Islands, declared integral Melanesian reserves (with the sole exception of the Wé enclave), because the land was deemed uncultivable, as on Art Island, and Bélep.

Under Governor Guillain (1861-1870), European land holdings increased from 26,700–77,700 hectares (66,000–192,000 acres), mainly in the southwestern savannas; with "a pious exhortation to moderation and respect for the potential rights of Melanesians" (Doumenge). Under Governor La Richerie (1870-1874), expansion continued. By 1877, under Governor Pritzbuer (1875-1878), settlers owned 150,000 ha. Gradually, decrees ratified the encroachments made.

The discovery of garnierite, a high-concentration nickel ore, in 1870 triggered a "nickel rush." Thio, the nickel capital from 1875, saw various immigrations: Chinese and Indian (1865, Malbars), penal (1872), then Japanese (1892), Indonesian (1895) and Réunionese.

The first official census recorded 42,519 Kanaks in 1887, 35,000 in 1891, 30,304 in 1897, 27,768 in 1901. This validates the estimate of the indigenous population at 50,000-90,000 in 1859, and 40,000-45,000 in 1877, for 17,000 settlers or non-Kanaks.

A last unofficial census by Henri Rivière counted, as of 1 January 1877, 2,752 settlers or assimilated (including 1,424 in Nouméa, 800 men and 624 women), 3,082 military and civilian employees, 3,836 deportees, and 6,000 transported, totaling about 16,000 non-Kanaks.

Nouméa was once a village of 300 inhabitants, 200 civilians, and 100 military, but the population grew to 1,200 inhabitants in 1864, 2,340 (including 706 military) in 1866, and about 8,000 in 1887.

The Indigenous Code (1887-1946) would serve as indigenous policy, but it was not yet fully applied or applicable.

At the beginning of French presence, missionary settlements were almost the only ones interested in the Kanak cultural world, Kanak languages, and Kanak social practices, first for evangelization, then with goals of civilization, and management of populations. Preaching was done in vernacular language, requiring learning Kanak languages or at least bilingual and compatible speakers. From 1863, teaching any language other than French was prohibited, mainly to counter English and Protestant influence.

The dual missionary presence became conflictual: Anglican (London Missionary Society) from 1841; from 1850, Catholicism of the Marist Brothers, or Marist Fathers. This led to real "religious wars" in the 1860s-1870s, requiring colonial authorities to restore order, generally favoring Catholics, at least in the Loyalty Islands. The change in Kanak life meant: "grouping of populations and clans around places of worship (temples or churches), development of monogamy and religious control over marital relations, end or easing of armed conflicts between clans, prohibition of nudity (with women wearing the mission dress, and men the manou (except in Nouméa)), and literacy, despite strong preservation of drehu by Protestants, in French."

Economically, colonization and mining development required significant food supplies. "Traditional indigenous crops, like yam, taro, banana, cassava, breadfruit, coconut, etc., with consumption generally limited to the village, gave way to colonial agriculture, i.e., vegetable gardens, orchards, coffee fields, fodder" for extensive cattle farming. Kanak horticulturists faced ranchers and agricultural operators.

From 1870 to 1877, livestock increased from 30,000 to 80,000 heads: pastoral overload, cattle straying (escaping from stations never enclosed, often entire valleys), destruction of unenclosed food crops (taro, yams...), deforestation, pollution of springs, water reserves, and sacred sites...

Many conflicts erupted with newcomers, whether claims came from tribal chiefs or (groups of) settlers, relaying grievances in their relations with the administration. This often resulted in sanctions against Melanesians: displacements, exiles, retreats to valley bottoms on inferior land, loss of customary lands. By 1903, Kanaks were dispossessed of 5/6 of traditional agricultural land.

Melanesians proved sensitive to foreign diseases: pulmonary tuberculosis, smallpox (1889), beriberi (1891), measles, influenza, whooping cough, scrofula, chickenpox, a form of dengue, leprosy (from 1865 to 1866), or yaws, dysentery, mumps. Jules Garnier proclaimed, "Everywhere we pass, the native wastes away and dies."

Kanaks, before first contact, were unaware of kava, betel, tobacco, alcohol. Tobacco was adopted. In 1862, no appetite for alcoholic beverages was reported. But soon, alcoholism wreaked havoc. A decision on February 12 1889 prohibited alcohol sales to Kanaks. The decree of March 10 1903 extended it to all Oceanian immigrants.

Apart from religious figures (and even then, differently according to denominations), Louise Michel and Maxime Lisbonne were among the few Europeans to express understanding of Kanak issues. In the Kanak world, as elsewhere, clan loyalties and disloyalties manifested, according to rivalries and cross-solidarities.

== Revolt ==
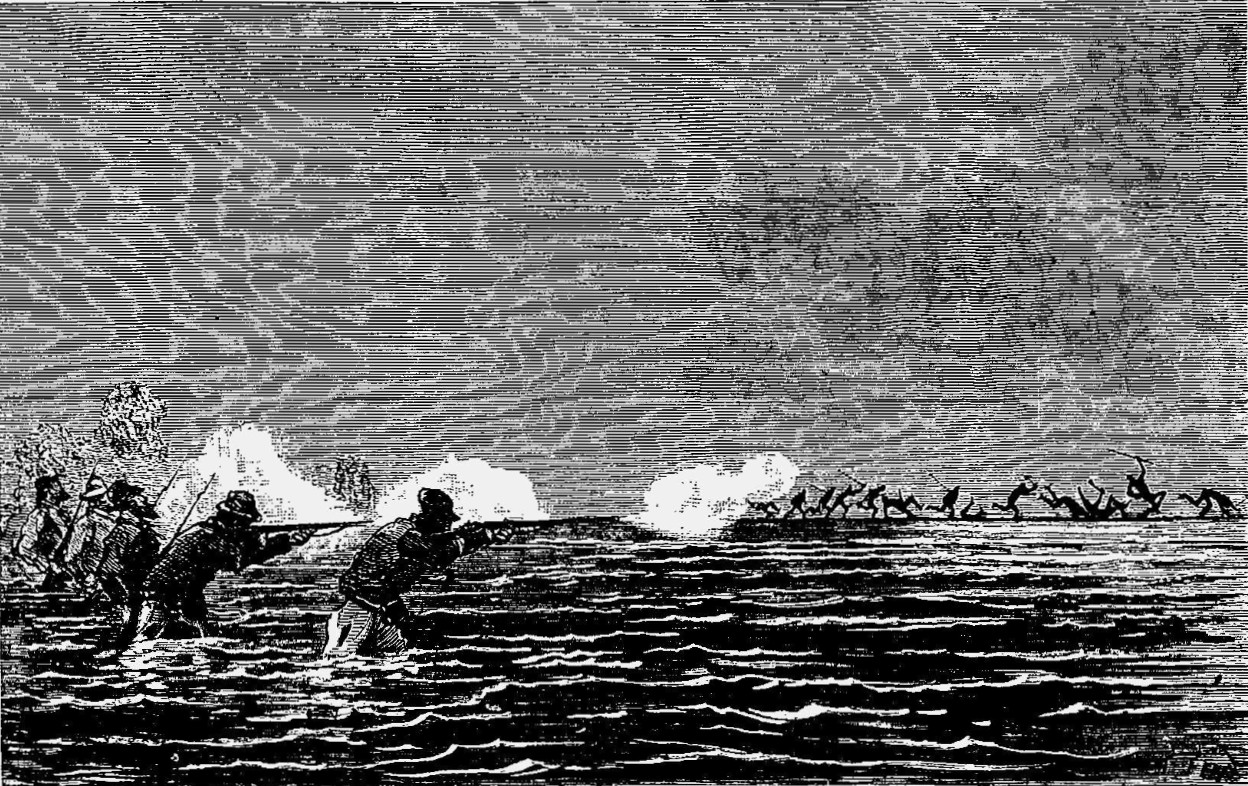
One of the French actions against the Kanaks (J. Férat, 1881)

The deep discontent of Melanesians had already been expressed several times, despite the apparent calm from 1869 to 1878. In 16 years, 72 whites were recorded as killed by natives. In 1857, the assassination of the Bérard family was particularly striking: 13 Westerners and about twenty non-Kanak employees. The number of Kanaks killed on such occasions is even harder to ascertain. Clashes between natives, in Kanak wars, remained low in human lives. Each group had an interest in being feared. In 1878, Ataï declared to the colonial governor of New Caledonia Léopold de Pritzbuer at Teremba, first pouring a bag of earth: "This is what we had," and then a bag of stones: "This is what you left us".

On 11 April 1878, Jean-Baptiste Léon Olry became the new governor of New Caledonia. On the Kanak insurgents' side, chiefdoms had consulted, with circulation of people and war messages, in long negotiations, through alliances. Ataï, great chief of Komalé, seemed to be the soul, at least the symbol, with Baptiste as his second. Promoters would be other chiefs, including Cavio, chief of Nékou, and Dionno, war chief at Bourail. Also involved were chiefs Bouarate (of Hienghène), Watton, Poindi-Patchili, Kaké, Gélina. Southern tribes remained neutral, as they were less able to act; some Kanak individuals may have participated. Northern coastal tribes largely did not participate (except Koumac, initially).

The plan was to attack Nouméa, by surprise: this would be the best way to destabilize colonization, even the French presence. The date was set for the end of the yam harvest, in July, perhaps as early as 26 June 1878 (according to Rivière). It was postponed to 24 September.

But, on 19 June preceding, at Ouaménie (Boulouparis), a Kanak group violently attacked the Dézarnauld property, more precisely the family of the guard Chêne, a former convict married to Medon, a native of Poquereux. The administration's reaction was strong: incarceration of ten chiefs.

The Nouméa objective was abandoned, replaced by a series of attacks across the pioneer front, from Poya (west coast), Baie Saint-Vincent, to Canala (east coast). La Foa, an important colonization point and center of virulent Melanesian clans, was targeted first.

Tuesday 25 June, a group of rebels, perhaps 3,000, invaded La Foa, killed four gendarmes, freed the imprisoned chief Touatté (of Dogny), and massacred settlers, isolated ranchers in wooded savannas. On 26 June, it was Boulouparis' turn: massacre of gendarmes, convicts, settlers, with women and children.

Then, the Thio valley was gradually occupied. The mining center was evacuated (but nickel prices had already fallen sharply). Europeans ceded ground, forced to let rebels pillage and burn. Those who could be evacuated by sea to Nouméa were. Others regrouped at the Téremba post (La Foa). Rivière arrived by boat and prevented the capture of Téremba.

Nouméa grew anxious, even panicked, and interned on Île Nou the 130 Melanesians living and working in Nouméa. A group of gentlemen spontaneously formed and, at the Dumbéa ferry, shot all Kanaks who presented themselves.

The military response aimed to be energetic, with the colony's military commander, Lieutenant-Colonel Gally-Passebosc. In this ill-adapted counter-offensive, Gally-Passebosc was killed in an ambush on 3 July. He was replaced by Commander Rivière.

Kanak troops achieved some military successes, such as at Cap Goulvain, Roches d'Adio (north of Bourail), or Poya.

The Fort Teremba, accompanying the La Foa penitentiary, was redeveloped and reinforced to serve as a stronghold and potential refuge, with a garrison of 80 soldiers. Work was completed on 24 August. The rebels, a large band estimated at 500 Melanesian warriors, failed before the fort, surprised by the effectiveness of Chassepots. Reinforcements of naval infantry arrived from Indochina from 18 August 1878, including Squadron Leader Albert Louis Candelot, who remained on the island until 1879. Ouégoa (north of the east coast) also received a fort at Ouamali.

Lieutenant-de-vaisseau Senan managed to rally Chief Gélima, Chief Kaké, and war chief Nondo of Canala to him and set out with them to find those responsible for past massacres, starting from Ciu. On 1 September, Ataï, his son, and his takata (?) Andia were killed by spears and beheaded by Segou and his men, the Kanaks of Canala. A carved bamboo (No. 53 of the Gaumont collection), from Ni or the Bouirou valley, provides testimony of the exhibition of seven heads, severed arms, and decapitated bodies watched over by a barefoot Kanak warrior with a rifle. Chief Baptiste was also killed, between La Foa and Moindou.

This seemed to be the turning point of the revolt: the initiative now lay with the army, Kanak auxiliaries, bush freemen (deportees and transported), and Arabs (Algerians of the Pacific, including Cheikh Boumerdassi, one of the leaders of the 1871 Kabyle insurrection), who joined the movement because they had been attacked by Kanaks at Bourail in September. Naïna replaced Ataï, Kaupa replaced Baptiste, and Chief François led the tribes around Ourail.

To counter this war of ambushes and guerrilla warfare, the tactic was counter-insurgency, aiming to reduce insurgent supply sources: burning villages, huts, and coconut groves; destroying plantations, harvests, and food crops.

The insurrection resumed further north, at Poya on 11 September, at Bourail on 22 September, and continued in October. However, pacification progressed. Then, the uprising strengthened in the west. The Kanak stronghold of Adio fell in December 1878.

Allegedly, in 1878, five francs were given for a pair of severed ears, which was later transformed into a bounty per severed head (to avoid paying for women and children killed, based solely on severed ears from the dead).

By late 1878, the territories of allies and those who had rallied (real commitment or mere neutralization) were on the east coast; insurgents were on the west coast, and the army moved there. Tribes that surrendered were promised their lives. The surrender of tribes began in the south and continued, with systematic mopping-up. On 15 January, Chief Naïna was killed. On 31 January, Chief Daouï (Népoui) was killed. In March, Chief Cham (Chief Owi) was captured. In April, Chief Judano "Djeuda" (Chief Owi) was also captured. In June 1879, the state of siege was definitively lifted.

The entire operation caused about 1,200 deaths, including 200 Europeans and 800 to 1,600 Kanaks. "Rivière was the effective architect of the French victory and the lucid witness of this insurrection" (Dousset-Leenhardt 1998ː63), assisted by Le Vaillant de Veaux-Martin, Le Golleur, and surveyor Gallet. Post commanders were Captain de Joux (Païta, Bouloupari), Lieutenant Vanauld (Ouraïl), Lieutenant Maréchal (Moindou), Captain Lambinet (Koné), Captain Merlaud (Houaïlou), Lieutenant Garcin (Thio), and Lieutenant-de-vaisseau Merlan (Canala). General Arthur de Trentinian arrived on 21 September and understood the gravity of the situation, though he remained little active on the ground.

== Aftermath ==
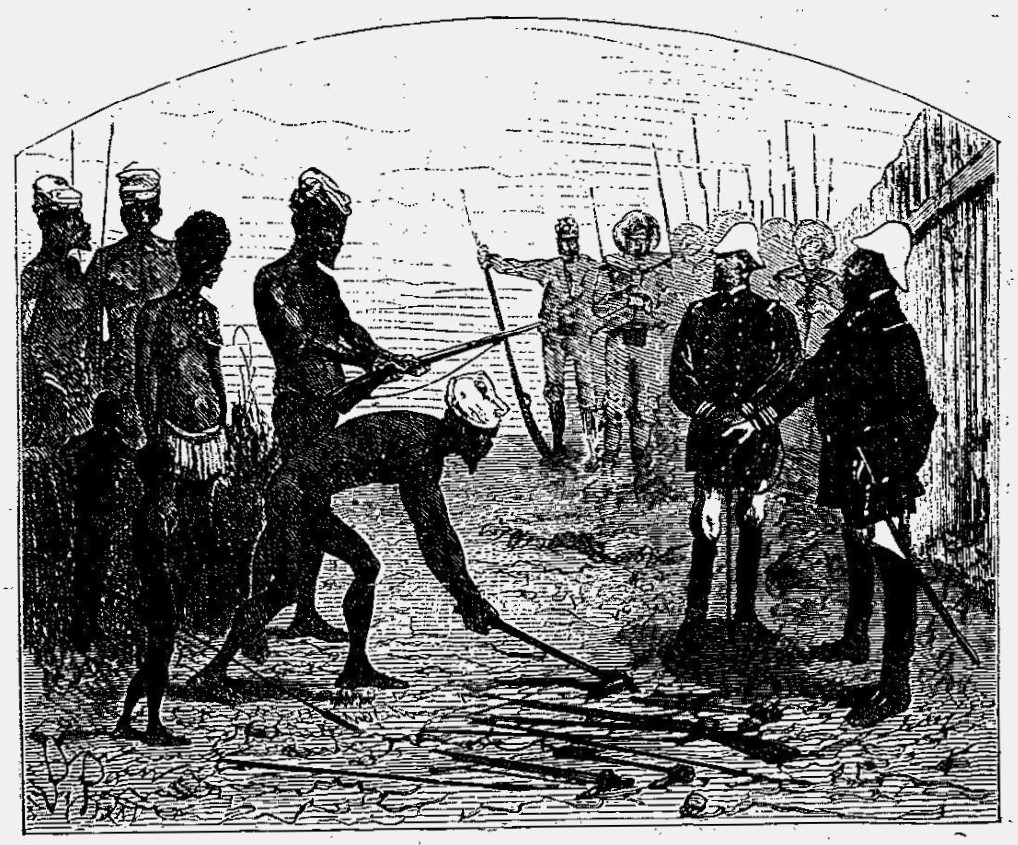
Surrender of the Kanak rebels to Henri Riviére (J. Férat, 1881)

1000 to 1500 Kanaks were deported to nearby islands, Île des Pins (600), Lifou, or distant ones, Bélep (far north, 200), but also later Tahiti, and even Obock. Rebel chiefs were executed without trial during operations, except one, arrested and court-martialed, Areki (tribe of Oua-Tom, La Foa, southern province), or without judicial information.

Frigate Captain A. Mathieu delivered a synthetic note on the causes of the insurrection (Dousset-Leenhardt 1998ː246-251). General Arthur de Trentinian (1822-1885) recognized, in his investigation into the causes of the 1878 insurrection, that "the dispossession of indigenous lands, the degradations suffered (?) by livestock, and the abusive requisitioning of labor gave rise to a sense of injustice among the natives." The full report can be read in Dousset-Leenhardt's work (pp. 127-159).

The consequences of the Great Revolt were disastrous for the Kanaks. Rebel tribes that surrendered were displaced (including that of Farino).

From 1879, amnesty laws were promulgated for some convicts, most of whom were required not to leave the territory. By 1899, New Caledonia had 20,000 inhabitants of European origin, half of whom were former convicts.

The Indigenous Code was established between 1874 and 1881 and fully applied in New Caledonia from 1887: deprivation for "French subjects" of most of their freedom and political rights; retention on the civil level of only their personal status, of religious or customary origin.

Indigenous space was restricted, by confiscation of rebel lands and land grabbing by the colony and settlers. Dispossession meant confining Melanesians to increasingly narrow reserves. From 1891 to 1912, on Grande Terre, reserves shrank from 320,000 to 121,000 hectares (1891: 320,000, 1898: 250,000, 1901: 123,000, under Governor Paul Feillet (1894-1903), and 1912: 121,664), or 13% of the initial area.

The exceptional case of Nassirah deserves mention. Settler Marc Le Goupils arrived in New Caledonia in 1898. He signed a contract with old chief Samuel, eager to regroup the scattered members of his tribe. Thus rose the new village of Nagouné, replacing old Nassirah, then the Lycée de Nassirah. The end was less glorious, in repression, death, exile.

Colonial expansion stabilized at first, then resumed. In 1883, there was no property under 600 ha, the average was 1000 ha, the maximum 10,000. Mining developed, with the creation in 1880 of the Société Le Nickel (SLN). Immigration resumed, Javanese, Vanuatuan...

The reserve balance was mixed: "Reserves were a brake on the integration of indigenous Melanesians and their adaptation to the modern world." "Delimited on Grande Terre without regard to the actual territories of each clan, grouping by confinement different clans sometimes enemies, isolating groups, established in ignorance of the real nature of customary organization, they altered hierarchies and traditional relations. Insufficient in soil and space, they hindered the expansion of marketable crops." "Reserves, however, had a positive role in preserving natives from the degradation that would have resulted from excessive or total dispossession. They also helped preserve their identity and retain important elements of their traditions as well as most of their languages."

Kanak social structures were disrupted: loss of customary lands, loss of caves where ancestors' remains rested, uprooting, loss of identity, lasting asthenia, depopulation, abandonment of entire swathes of custom. The first official census recorded 42,519 Kanaks in 1887, 35,000 in 1891, 30,304 in 1897, 27,768 in 1901, constituting a real bleeding: 5% of the Melanesian population. The population declined, stabilizing at about 28,000 people (including 17,000 on Grande Terre) between 1900 and 1920.

The demographic decline of Melanesian and Polynesian peoples was quite general at the end of the 19th century (New Zealand, Hawaii, Tahiti, Marquesas, Anatom (Vanuatu)...), and accompanied resistance to colonization and expropriation. All proportions kept, it is legitimate to think of the contemporary American treatment of Native Americans (including the Battle of Little Bighorn of 1876), the Kaffir Wars (in South Africa), the treatment of Australian Aborigines, and the Māori of New Zealand.

Maurice Leenhardt recorded these words of a Kanak chief: "The whites lied to us; it is better to drink and then die."

Kanak collective memory manifested, perhaps for the last time, in carved bamboos, as evidenced by the collection of Gustave Glaumont, commissioner of the penitentiary administration, stationed on Île des Pins from 1880 to 1891.

The 1889 Paris Universal Exposition had its Negro Village and its Kanak Village, with its large hut, with a delegation led by Pita, son of the great chief Gélima of Canala.

These developments were one of the causes of the 1917 Kanak Revolt, and, fifty years after this last revolt, at the origin of independence claims. In 1968, young Kanaks resumed the struggle, founded the Group 1878, the Red Scarves movement, which would become the Kanak Liberation Party.

Since then, following the Ouvéa hostage-taking (1988), through the Matignon Agreements (1988) and the Nouméa Accord, the current Customary Civil Status of New Caledonia, customary councils, customary areas, and the Customary Senate were established or reinstated.

== Bibliography ==
- Michel Naepels, *Histories of Kanak Lands* (Houaïlou), Paris, 1998, Belin.
- Jean Guiart, *Melanesian Societies: False Ideas, True Ideas*, Le Rocher-à-la-Voile, Nouméa 2001 (cover reads *Canaque Societies*).
- Sylvette Boubin-Boyer (collective work, under her direction), *Revolts, Conflicts, and World Wars in New Caledonia and Its Region* (2 volumes), Paris, L'Harmattan, 2008, ISBN 978-2-296-05121-8.
- Roselène Dousset-Leenhardt, *Native Land, Land of Exile*, Paris, Maisonneuve and Larose, 1976, reissued 1998, 316 p., ISBN 2-7068-1316-4.
- Roselène Dousset-Leenhardt, *Colonialism and Contradictions, New Caledonia 1878-1978. The Causes of the 1878 Insurrection*, Paris, 1978, L'Harmattan.
- Frédéric Angleviel (under his direction), *Religion and the Sacred in Oceania*, 2000, L'Harmattan.
- Claude Cornet, *The Great Revolt of 1878*, éditions de la Boudeuse, Nouméa, 2000, 316 pages, numerous reproduced period documents.
- Marc Le Goupils, *The Pioneer's Daughters*, Paris, 1910.
- Françoise d'Eaubonne, *Louise Michel the Kanak: 1873-1880*, narrative, Éditions Encre, 1985.
- Didier Daeninckx, *The Return of Ataï*, Paris, 2001.
- Xavière Gauthier, *The Grass of War*, Paris, éd. Syros, 1992.
- Yoram Mouchenik, *The Vulnerable Child*, Grenoble, éd. La Pensée sauvage.
- Bernard Berger, *1878 The Path of Men*, Nouméa 1999.
