= Maya Laylor =

Canadian weightlifter (born 1995)

Maya Celeste Laylor
Personal information
- Born: July 4, 1995 (age 31) Toronto, Ontario, Canada

Sport
- Country: Canada
- Sport: Weightlifting
Medal record
Women's weightlifting
Representing Canada
Commonwealth Games
Gold medal – first place	2022 Birmingham	76 kg
Commonwealth Championships
Gold medal – first place	2019 Apia	–71 kg
Gold medal – first place	2021 Tashkent	–76 kg

Maya Celeste Laylor (born July 4, 1995) is a Canadian weightlifter from Toronto, Ontario. She won the gold medal in the women's 76 kg event at the 2022 Commonwealth Games held in Birmingham, England.

== Career ==
=== Junior ===
Laylor competed at two World Juniors Weightlifting Championships, finishing with a no mark in 2014 and 5th in 2015, both in the 69 kg event.

=== Senior ===
Laylor is a two time Commonwealth Weightlifting Championships champion.

In March 2022, Laylor was officially named to Canada's 2022 Commonwealth Games team. Laylor would go onto win the gold medal in the 76 kg event at the games.
