= Teremba Bay =

Coordinates: 21°45′33″S 165°43′43″E

Teremba Bay or Baie Teremba, formerly known as Uarai Bay, is a bay in southwestern New Caledonia. Moindou Bay lies to the west and Chanbeyron Bay lies to the southeast, separated by Lebris Island. The La Foa River enters the sea through a swampy area at Teremba Bay from the northeast. A notable fort, Fort Teremba, known as being a prison for deportees, lies opposite the river mouth. On July 12, 1922, the ship France II ran aground on the bay's reef.
