= Maximina Uepa =

Nauruan weightlifter (born 2002)

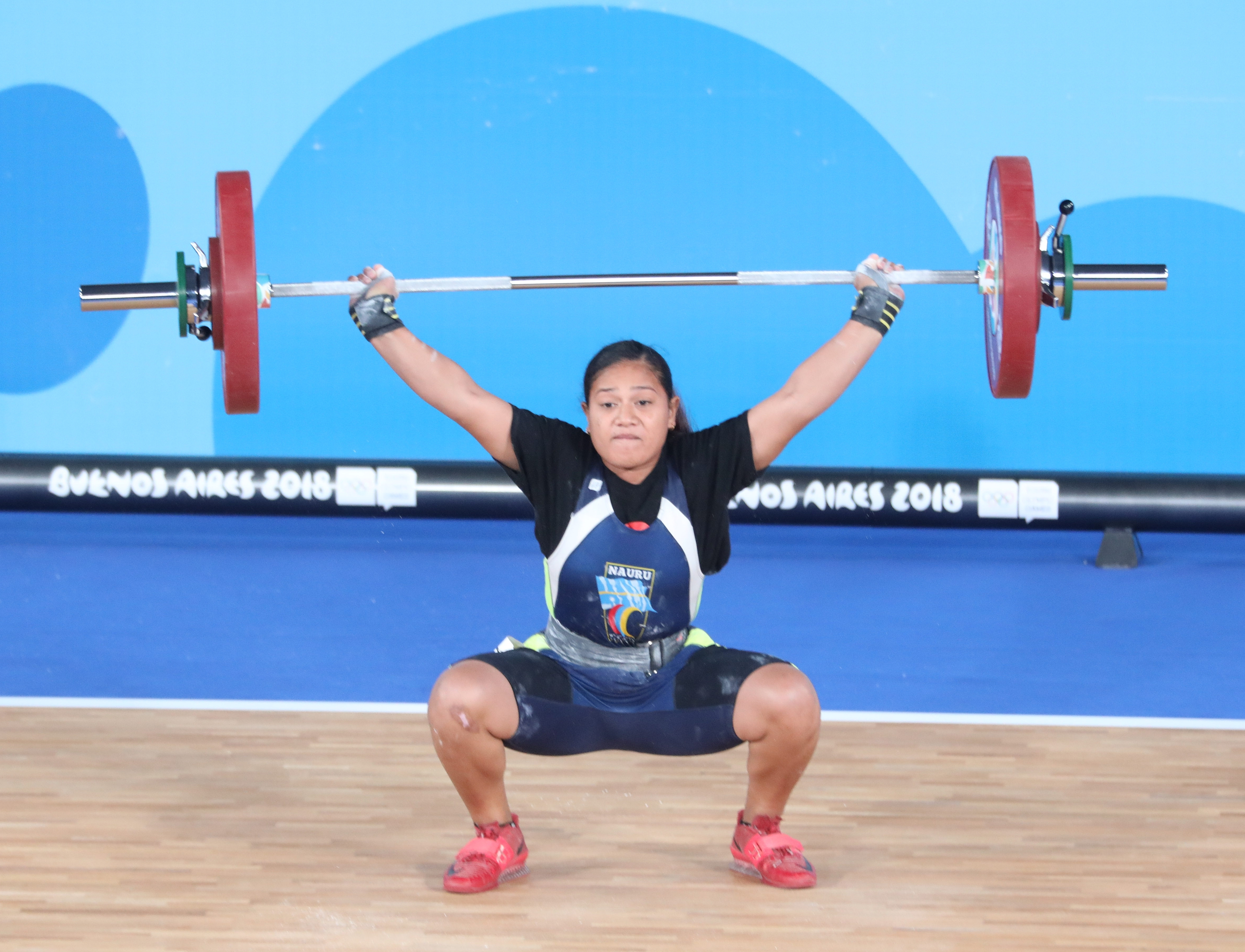
- Weightlifting girls' 63 kg at the 2018 Summer Youth Olympics in Buenos Aires on 12 October 2018. Snatch.

Personal information
- Nationality: Nauru
- Born: 22 September 2002 (age 24) Denigomodu, Nauru

Sport
- Sport: Weightlifting
- Events: –64 kg, –71 kg
Medal record
Women's weightlifting
Representing Nauru
Commonwealth Games
Bronze medal – third place	2022 Birmingham	76 kg
Pacific Games
Gold medal – first place	2019 Apia	71kg (Note: Plus clean & jerk gold and snatch silver)
Commonwealth Championships
Silver medal – second place	2019 Apia	71 kg
Oceania Championships
Gold medal – first place	2018 Le Mont-Dore	63 kg
Gold medal – first place	2019 Apia	71 kg
Silver medal – second place	2021	76 kg
Bronze medal – third place	2017 Gold Coast	63 kg
Pacific Mini Games
Bronze medal – third place	2017 Vila	63 kg

Maximina Uepa (born 22 September 2002) is a Nauruan weightlifter. She won the bronze medal in the women's 76 kg event at the 2022 Commonwealth Games held in Birmingham, England. She is the current Nauruan women's record-holder in the 71 kg category for overall, snatch and clean and jerk.

== Biography ==
Uepa was born on 22 September 2002 in Denig, Nauru. Her father, Jezza Uepa, and her brother, Maxius Uepa, are both successful powerlifters. Jezza Uepa won the 120kg+ class/super heavyweight class in the IPF World Powerlifting Championships in 2019. In 2015 she was the youngest competitor at the Commonwealth Youth Games, aged twelve years old. She competed in the 58kg weightlifting category.

In 2018, she was flagbearer for Nauru at the Summer Youth Olympics. She was recognised as Nauruan Sportsperson of the Year (Female) in 2018. She was a bronze medallist in the 63kg category at the Pacific Mini Games in 2017, only beaten by Mattie Sasser (gold) and Amanda Gould (silver). In 2019 she moved from the 63kg to the 71kg category. She is the current Nauruan Olympic record-holder in the snatch, clean and jerk and overall; this record was set at the 2019 Pacific Games, where she also won two gold medals.

In August 2022, Uepa won the bronze medal in the women's 76 kg event at the 2022 Commonwealth Games held in Birmingham, England. She dedicated her medal to weightlifter Reanna Solomon, who died from COVID-19 in July 2022.

== Nauruan records ==
=== Current ===
Event	Record	Date	Meet	Place	Ref
71 kg
Snatch	87 kg	7 December 2019	Pacific Cup	Nouméa, New Caledonia	
Clean and Jerk	113 kg	7 December 2019	Pacific Cup	Nouméa, New Caledonia	
Total	200 kg	7 December 2019	Pacific Cup	Nouméa, New Caledonia	

=== Historic (2002-2018) ===
63 kg
Snatch	85 kg			
Clean and jerk	95 kg	5 December 2017	Pacific Mini Games	Port Vila, Vanuatu
Total	170 kg	7 April 2018	Commonwealth Games	Gold Coast, Australia

Medalbox note
