= La Foa River =

River of New Caledonia

Coordinates: 21°43′50″S 165°45′39″E

The La Foa River is a river of New Caledonia. It has a catchment area of 438 square kilometres. It flows into the Teremba Bay on the southwestern coast.

== See also ==
- List of rivers of New Caledonia
