= Weightlifting at the 2022 Commonwealth Games – Women's 76 kg =

Weightlifting – Women's 76 kg at the 2022 Commonwealth Games
- Venue: National Exhibition Centre
- Dates: 2 August
- Competitors: 11 from 11 nations
- Winning total: 228 kg

Medalists
| gold medal | Maya Laylor | Canada |
| silver medal | Taiwo Liadi | Nigeria |
| bronze medal | Maximina Uepa | Nauru |

The women's 76 kg weightlifting event at the 2022 Commonwealth Games took place at the National Exhibition Centre on 2 August 2022. The weightlifter from Canada won the gold, with a combined lift of 228 kg.

== Records ==
Prior to this competition, the existing World, Commonwealth and Games records were as follows:
When the previous records and weight classes were discarded following readjustment, the IWF defined "world standards" as the minimum lifts needed to qualify as world records (WR), CommonWealth Authority defined "Commonwealth standards" and "Commonwealth games standards" as the minimum lifts needed to qualify as Commonwealth record (CR) and Commonwealth games record (GR) in the new weight classes. Wherever World Standard/Commonwealth Standard/Commonwealth Games Standard appear in the list below, no qualified weightlifter has yet lifted the benchmark weights in a sanctioned competition.

| World record | Snatch | Rim Jong-sim (PRK) | 124 kg | Pattaya, Thailand | 18 September 2019 |
| World record | Clean & Jerk | Zhang Wangli (CHN) | 156 kg | Fuzhou, China | 26 February 2019 |
| World record | Total | Rim Jong-sim (PRK) | 278 kg | Ningbo, China | 21 April 2019 |
| Commonwealth record | Snatch | Maya Laylor (CAN) | 102 kg | Guayaquil, Ecuador | 6 November 2021 |
| Commonwealth record | Clean & Jerk | Kristel Ngarlem (CAN) | 134 kg | Rome, Italy | 30 January 2021 |
| Commonwealth record | Total | Kristel Ngarlem (CAN) | 233 kg | Rome, Italy | 30 January 2021 |
| Games record | Snatch | Commonwealth Games Standard | 101 kg | | |
| Games record | Clean & Jerk | Commonwealth Games Standard | 127 kg | | |
| Games record | Total | Commonwealth Games Standard | 227 kg | | |

The following records were established during the competition:

| Clean & Jerk | 128 kg | Maya Laylor (CAN) | GR |
| Total | 228 kg | Maya Laylor (CAN) | GR |

== Schedule ==
All times are British Summer Time (UTC+1)

| Date | Time | Round |
|---|---|---|
| Tuesday 2 August 2022 | 9:30 | Final |

== Results ==
| Rank | Athlete | Body weight (kg) | Snatch (kg) | | | | Clean & Jerk (kg) | | | | Total |
| Rank | Athlete | Body weight (kg) | 1 | 2 | 3 | Result | 1 | 2 | 3 | Result | Total |
|---|---|---|---|---|---|---|---|---|---|---|---|
| 1st place, gold medalist(s) | Maya Laylor (CAN) | 75.33 | 100 | ~~105~~ | ~~105~~ | 100 | 123 | 128 | ~~135~~ | 128 GR | 228 GR |
| 2nd place, silver medalist(s) | Taiwo Liadi (NGR) | 74.23 | 90 | 95 | 96 | 96 | ~~115~~ | 115 | 120 | 120 JCR | 216 JCR |
| 3rd place, bronze medalist(s) | Maximina Uepa (NRU) | 72.57 | 90 | 94 | 96 | 96 | 115 | 119 | ~~122~~ | 119 | 215 |
| 4 | Deborah Alawode (ENG) | 75.67 | 90 | 93 | ~~96~~ | 93 | 114 | ~~119~~ | 119 | 119 | 212 |
| 5 | Jeanne Gaelle Eyenga Mboosi (CMR) | 75.62 | ~~90~~ | 90 | ~~96~~ | 90 | 115 | 119 | 122 | 122 | 212 |
| 6 | Ebony Gorincu (AUS) | 74.58 | ~~89~~ | 89 | 93 | 93 | 113 | ~~119~~ | ~~119~~ | 113 | 206 |
| 7 | Agata Herbert (SCO) | 75.09 | 86 | ~~90~~ | ~~90~~ | 86 | 105 | 110 | 113 | 113 | 199 |
| 8 | Chloe Rebecca Whylie (JAM) | 74.82 | 78 | 81 | ~~84~~ | 81 | ~~95~~ | 95 | ~~98~~ | 95 | 176 |
| 9 | Monira Kazi (BAN) | 71.02 | 75 | ~~78~~ | ~~78~~ | 75 | ~~95~~ | 95 | ~~98~~ | 95 | 170 |
| — | Punam Yadav (IND) | 75.46 | ~~95~~ | 95 | 98 | 98 | ~~116~~ | ~~116~~ | ~~116~~ | — | DNF |
| — | Amy Salt (WAL) | 73.53 | 70 | 86 | ~~90~~ | 86 | ~~105~~ | ~~107~~ | ~~107~~ | — | DNF |
