= Moindou =

Commune of New Caledonia

- Commune
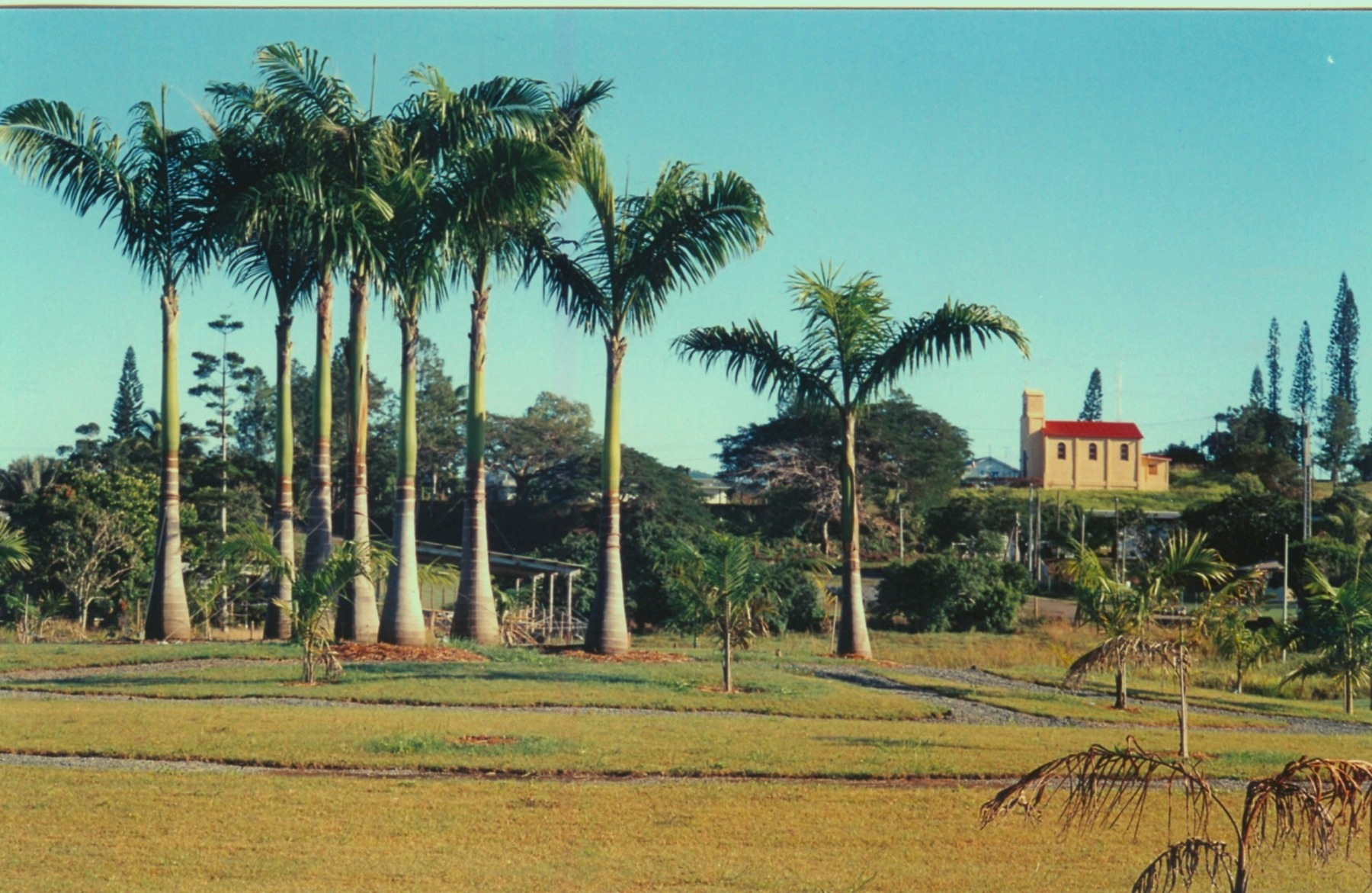
- The Garden of the Future and the chapel of Moindou

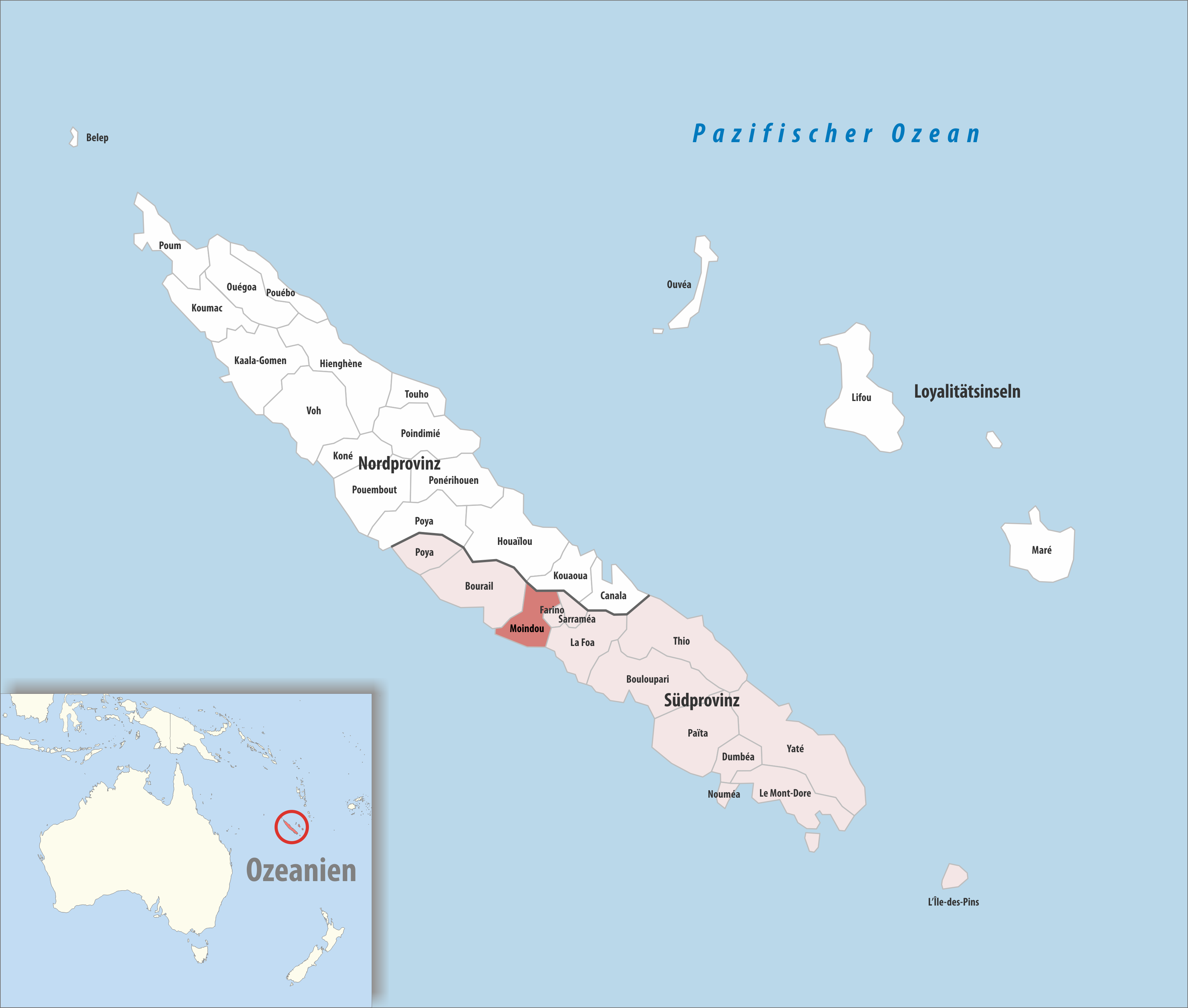
- Location of the commune (in red) within New Caledonia
- Location of Moindou
- Coordinates: 21°41′52″S 165°40′42″E
- Country: France
- Sui generis collectivity: New Caledonia
- Province: South Province

Government
  - Mayor (2020–2026): Léon-Joseph Peyronnet
- Area^{1}: 321.9 km^{2} (124.3 sq mi)
- Elevation: 20 m (66 ft)
- Highest elevation: 1,098 m (3,602 ft)
- Lowest elevation: 0 m (0 ft)
- Population (2019 census): 681
  - Density: 2.12/km^{2} (5.48/sq mi)

Ethnic distribution
  - 2019 census: Kanaks 52.28% Europeans 15.12% Wallisians and Futunans 1.03% Mixed 15.86% Other 15.71%
- Time zone: UTC+11:00
- INSEE/Postal code: 98816 /98819
- ^{1} New Caledonia Land Register (DITTT) data, which exclude lakes and ponds larger than 1 km² (0.386 sq mi or 247 acres) as well as the estuaries of rivers.

Moindou (French: [mwɛ̃du], Neku: Mwâârhûû) is a commune in the South Province of New Caledonia, an overseas territory of France in the Pacific Ocean.
