= Swimming at the 2025 Junior Pan American Games – Results =

These are the official results of the swimming events at the 2025 Junior Pan American Games. A total of 36 events took place from August 10 to 14, 2025, all held at the Olympic Aquatic Centre, located in the Olympic Park in Luque, in the Greater Asuncion area. The 36 events consisted of 28 individual events (17 men and 17 women) and eight relays (three men, three women and two mixed).

== Men's results ==
=== 50 metre freestyle ===
Heats – August 13

Rank	Heat	Name	Nationality	Time	Notes
1	4	Lamar Taylor	Bahamas	22.32	Q
2	5	Guilherme Caribé	Brazil	22.37	Q
3	5	Nikoli Blackman	Trinidad and Tobago	22.47	Q
4	5	Pedro Sansone	Brazil	22.65	Q
5	5	Jorge Otaiza	Venezuela	22.69	Q
6	3	Gabriel Martínez	Honduras	22.71	Q, NR
=7	5	Zarek Wilson	Trinidad and Tobago	22.97	Q
=7	4	Alfredo Velásquez	Mexico	22.97	Q
9	3	Diego Aranda	Uruguay	23.07	q
10	3	Marvin Johnson	Bahamas	23.08	q
11	4	Frank Solano	Colombia	23.15	q
12	2	Jack Harvey	Bermuda	23.25	q
13	2	Maximillian Wilson	Virgin Islands	23.26	q
14	4	Javier Núñez	Dominican Republic	23.27	q
15	4	Cristián Ramos	Dominican Republic	23.41	q
16	5	Emil Pérez	Venezuela	23.43	q
17	5	James Allison	Cayman Islands	23.49	
18	3	Raphaël Grand'Pierre	Haiti	23.57	
19	3	Ismael Holtuin	Suriname	23.59	
20	4	Santiago Leiva	Paraguay	23.70	
21	4	Julio Rodríguez	Panama	23.74	
22	5	Santiago Arteaga	Colombia	23.77	
23	4	Camilo Villalba	Paraguay	23.82	
24	2	Andrey Villarreal	Panama	24.10	
25	3	Erick Blandón	Nicaragua	24.21	
26	2	Christian Jerome	Haiti	24.39	
27	2	José Manuel Campo	El Salvador	24.53	
28	1	Yadiel Estrada	Cuba	24.59	
29	2	Tivon Benjamin	Antigua and Barbuda	24.61	
30	1	Matthew Ballah	Saint Vincent and the Grenadines	24.67	
31	2	Paul Junior Mahaica	Guyana	24.79	
32	2	Roberto Gossmann	Guatemala	24.96	
33	1	Victor Ashby	Barbados	25.18	
34	1	Kito Campbell	Jamaica	25.27	
35	1	Jenebi Colil Benoit	Grenada	25.52	
36	1	Hazen Da Briel	Saint Vincent and the Grenadines	25.87	
37	3	Matías Santiso	Argentina	25.89	
	3	Andrés Dupont	Mexico	DNS	

Final A – August 13

Rank	Name	Nationality	Time	Notes
1st place, gold medalist(s)	Guilherme Caribé	Brazil	21.72	JPR
2nd place, silver medalist(s)	Lamar Taylor	Bahamas	22.11	
3rd place, bronze medalist(s)	Nikoli Blackman	Trinidad and Tobago	22.32	
3rd place, bronze medalist(s)	Pedro Sansone	Brazil	22.32	
5	Jorge Otaiza	Venezuela	22.53	
6	Gabriel Martínez	Honduras	22.72	
7	Alfredo Velásquez	Mexico	22.91	
8	Zarek Wilson	Trinidad and Tobago	23.07	

Final B – August 13

Rank	Name	Nationality	Time	Notes
=9	Cristián Ramos	Dominican Republic	23.05	
=9	Marvin Johnson	Bahamas	23.05	
11	Diego Aranda	Uruguay	23.08	
=12	Frank Solano	Colombia	23.10	
=12	Javier Núñez	Dominican Republic	23.16	
14	Maximillian Wilson	Virgin Islands	23.16	
15	Jack Harvey	Bermuda	23.22	
16	Emil Pérez	Venezuela	23.37	

=== 100 metre freestyle ===
Heats – August 12

Rank	Heat	Name	Nationality	Time	Notes
1	5	Guilherme Caribé	Brazil	49.75	Q
2	5	Lamar Taylor	Bahamas	49.91	Q
=3	4	Nikoli Blackman	Trinidad and Tobago	49.94	Q
=3	3	Andrés Dupont	Mexico	49.94	Q
5	3	Pedro Sansone	Brazil	49.98	Q
6	5	James Allison	Cayman Islands	50.11	Q
7	4	Gabriel Martínez	Honduras	50.14	Q
8	5	Dennis Pérez	Venezuela	50.15	Q
9	4	Matías Santiso	Argentina	50.27	q
10	5	Zarek Wilson	Trinidad and Tobago	50.40	q
11	3	Emil Pérez	Venezuela	50.76	q
12	4	Javier Núñez	Dominican Republic	50.87	q
13	5	Santiago Arteaga	Colombia	50.89	q
14	3	Marvin Johnson	Bahamas	50.99	q
15	3	Frank Solano	Colombia	51.08	q
16	5	Anthony Piñeiro	Dominican Republic	51.36	
17	4	Elías Ardiles	Chile	51.52	q
18	4	Inald Fernandes	Aruba	51.58	
19	3	David Medina	Mexico	51.69	
20	4	Diego Aranda	Uruguay	51.76	
21	4	Ethan Stubbs-Green	Antigua and Barbuda	52.01	
22	3	Raphaël Grand'Pierre	Haiti	52.08	
23	2	Andrey Villarreal	Panama	52.22	
24	2	Esteban Nuñez	Bolivia	52.55	
25	2	Roberto Gossmann	Guatemala	52.60	
26	5	Camilo Villalba	Paraguay	52.67	
27	2	Julio Rodríguez	Panama	53.12	
28	2	Ismael Holtuin	Suriname	53.16	
29	2	Christian Jerome	Haiti	53.25	
30	1	Yadiel Estrada	Cuba	53.41	
31	2	José Manuel Campo	El Salvador	53.64	
32	3	Erick Blandón	Nicaragua	53.79	
33	1	Paul Junior Mahaica	Guyana	54.23	
34	2	Tivon Benjamin	Antigua and Barbuda	54.25	
35	1	Matthew Ballah	Saint Vincent and the Grenadines	55.33	
36	1	Jenebi Colil Benoit	Grenada	55.68	
37	1	Hazen Da Briel	Saint Vincent and the Grenadines	56.38	
38	1	Jonathan Essien	Saint Kitts and Nevis	1:00.01	

Final A – August 12

Rank	Name	Nationality	Time	Notes
1st place, gold medalist(s)	Guilherme Caribé	Brazil	47.54	
2nd place, silver medalist(s)	Andrés Dupont	Mexico	48.14	NR
3rd place, bronze medalist(s)	Lamar Taylor	Bahamas	48.51	NR
4	Nikoli Blackman	Trinidad and Tobago	49.16	
5	Dennis Pérez	Venezuela	49.63	
6	Pedro Sansone	Brazil	49.76	
7	Gabriel Martínez	Honduras	49.99	
8	James Allison	Cayman Islands	50.19	

Final B – August 12

Rank	Name	Nationality	Time	Notes
9	Matías Santiso	Argentina	50.35	
10	Frank Solano	Colombia	50.36	
11	Zarek Wilson	Trinidad and Tobago	50.65	
12	Santiago Arteaga	Colombia	51.91	
13	Javier Núñez	Dominican Republic	51.13	
14	Marvin Johnson	Bahamas	51.14	
15	Elías Ardiles	Chile	51.23	
16	Emil Pérez	Venezuela	51.40	

=== 200 metre freestyle ===
Heats – August 13

Rank	Heat	Name	Nationality	Time	Notes
1	4	Stephan Steverink	Brazil	1:49.75	Q
2	3	Nikoli Blackman	Trinidad and Tobago	1:50.62	Q
3	4	Eduardo Cisternas	Chile	1:50.73	Q
4	3	James Allison	Cayman Islands	1:50.81	Q
5	4	David Medina	Mexico	1:51.39	Q
6	3	Matías Santiso	Argentina	1:51.55	Q
7	3	Santiago Arteaga	Colombia	1:51.61	Q
8	4	Sebastián Muñoz	Colombia	1:52.27	Q
9	2	Davi Zanella	Brazil	1:52.74	q
10	2	Caleb Romero	Puerto Rico	1:52.74	q
11	2	José Alberto Cano	Mexico	1:52.81	q
12	2	Dennis Pérez	Venezuela	1:52.86	q
13	4	José Nolla	Puerto Rico	1:53.28	q
14	2	Mauricio Arias	Dominican Republic	1:54.67	q
15	4	Máximo Aguilar	Argentina	1:54.83	q
16	3	Inald Fernandes	Aruba	1:55.51	q
17	2	Alberto Vega	Costa Rica	1:56.19	
18	3	Zachary Anthony	Trinidad and Tobago	1:56.43	
19	4	Yatsen Soza	Bolivia	1:56.60	NR
20	3	Christian Jerome	Haiti	1:57.95	
21	2	Camilo Villalba	Paraguay	1:58.47	
22	3	Luis Jimenez	Ecuador	1:58.67	
23	2	Kaeden Gleason	Virgin Islands	1:58.95	
24	1	Laurent Barrios	Paraguay	1:59.01	
25	4	Roberto Gossmann	Guatemala	1:59.02	
26	1	José Manuel Ergui	Uruguay	2:01.11	
27	1	José Manuel Campo	El Salvador	2:04.38	
28	1	Hazen Da Briel	Saint Vincent and the Grenadines	2:05.93	

Final A – August 13

Rank	Name	Nationality	Time	Notes
1st place, gold medalist(s)	Stephan Steverink	Brazil	1:47.23	
2nd place, silver medalist(s)	Eduardo Cisternas	Chile	1:47.99	NR
3rd place, bronze medalist(s)	Matías Santiso	Argentina	1:50.03	
4	Nikoli Blackman	Trinidad and Tobago	1:50.04	
5	David Medina	Mexico	1:50.36	
6	James Allison	Cayman Islands	1:50.38	
7	Santiago Arteaga	Colombia	1:51.97	
8	Sebastián Muñoz	Colombia	1:53.49	

Final B – August 13

Rank	Name	Nationality	Time	Notes
9	Davi Zanella	Brazil	1:49.74	
10	Caleb Romero	Puerto Rico	1:52.45	
11	José Alberto Cano	Mexico	1:52.56	
12	José Nolla	Puerto Rico	1:52.68	
13	Dennis Pérez	Venezuela	1:53.66	
14	Inald Fernandes	Aruba	1:%4.92	
15	Máximo Aguilar	Argentina	1:55.13	
16	Mauricio Arias	Dominican Republic	1:58.40	

=== 400 metre freestyle ===
Heats – August 11

Rank	Heat	Name	Nationality	Time	Notes
1	3	Stephan Steverink	Brazil	3:54.39	Q
2	2	Eduardo Cisternas	Chile	3:55.83	Q
3	3	Leonardo Alcântara	Brazil	3:57.07	Q
4	2	Paulo Strehlke	Mexico	3:57.82	Q
5	2	Raúl Briceño	Venezuela	3:58.48	Q
6	3	Santiago Gutiérrez	Mexico	4:01.06	Q
7	3	Caleb Romero	Puerto Rico	4:01.35	Q
8	3	Sebastián Muñoz	Colombia	4:01.49	Q
9	3	José Nolla	Puerto Rico	4:03.72	q
10	2	Alberto Vega	Costa Rica	4:05.42	q
11	1	Mauricio Arias	Dominican Republic	4:07.70	q
12	3	Juan Manuel Ergui	Uruguay	4:09.67	q
13	2	Diego Dulieu	Honduras	4:10.67	
14	1	Yatsen Soza	Bolivia	4:10.87	q, NR
15	2	Luis Jiménez	Ecuador	4:11.03	q
16	2	Vladimir Mojarrieta	Cuba	4:11.47	q
17	3	Sergio Ybarra	Venezuela	4:12.15	q
18	1	Laurent Barrios	Paraguay	4:16.69	
19	1	José Matías Fleitas	Paraguay	4:21.81	
	2	Ethan Stubbs-Green	Antigua and Barbuda	DNS	

Final A – August 11

Rank	Name	Nationality	Time	Notes
1st place, gold medalist(s)	Stephan Steverink	Brazil	3:46.71	
2nd place, silver medalist(s)	Eduardo Cisternas	Chile	3:49.40	NR
3rd place, bronze medalist(s)	Leonardo Alcântara	Brazil	3:50.55	
4	Paulo Strehlke	Mexico	3:53.05	
5	Raúl Briceño	Venezuela	3:58.91	
6	Santiago Gutiérrez	Mexico	3:59.14	
7	Caleb Romero	Puerto Rico	4:00.37	
8	Sebastián Muñoz	Colombia	4:00.89	

Final B – August 11

Rank	Name	Nationality	Time	Notes
9	José Nolla	Puerto Rico	4:03.49	
10	Sergio Ybarra	Venezuela	4:04.74	
11	Alberto Vega	Costa Rica	4:04.94	
12	Mauricio Arias	Dominican Republic	4:08.29	
13	Juan Manuel Ergui	Uruguay	4:09.18	
14	Luis Jiménez	Ecuador	4:09.47	
15	Vladimir Mojarrieta	Cuba	4:11.89	
16	Yatsen Soza	Bolivia	4:13.39	

=== 800 metre freestyle ===
Final 1 – August 12

Rank	Name	Nationality	Time	Notes
1	Rodrigo Ventura	El Salvador	8:46.20	
2	Joaquín Estigarribia	Paraguay	8:58.79	
3	Juan Apocada	Paraguay	9:04.32	

Final 2 – August 12

Rank	Name	Nationality	Time	Notes
1	Sebastián Muñoz	Colombia	8:25.75	
2	José Nolla	Puerto Rico	8:26.85	
3	Sergio Ybarra	Venezuela	8:35.96	
4	Vladimir Mojarreta	Cuba	8:38.53	
5	Alberto Vega	Costa Rica	8:41.40	
6	Luis Jimenez	Ecuador	8:41.84	

Medal Final – August 12

Rank	Name	Nationality	Time	Notes
1st place, gold medalist(s)	Stephan Steverink	Brazil	7:54.49	JPR
2nd place, silver medalist(s)	João Pierre Campos	Brazil	8:00.99	
3rd place, bronze medalist(s)	Paulo Strehlke	Mexico	8:02.87	
4	Santiago Gutiérrez	Mexico	8:14.72	
5	Raúl Briceño	Venezuela	8:16.52	
6	Jamarr Bruno	Puerto Rico	8:17.11	
7	Diego Dulieu	Honduras	8:28.86	
8	Adrián Ywanaga	Peru	8:31.72	

=== 1500 metre freestyle ===
Final – August 14

Rank	Name	Nationality	Time	Notes
1	Sergio Ybarra	Venezuela	16:18.90	
2	Alberto Vega	Costa Rica	16:30.38	
3	Vladimir Mojarreta	Cuba	16:31.76	
4	Joaquín Estigarribia	Paraguay	17:13.04	
5	Juan Apocada	Paraguay	17:40.87	

Medal Final – August 12

Rank	Name	Nationality	Time	Notes
1st place, gold medalist(s)	João Pierre Campos	Brazil	15:19.77	
2nd place, silver medalist(s)	Mattheu Melecchi	Brazil	15:21.13	
3rd place, bronze medalist(s)	Santiago Gutiérrez	Mexico	15:45.58	
4	Jamarr Bruno	Puerto Rico	15:50.54	
5	Adrián Ywanaga	Peru	16:07.69	
6	José Manuel Ergui	Uruguay	16:13.94	
7	Sebastián González	Venezuela	16:23.68	
8	Sebastián Muñoz	Colombia	16:42.43	

=== 100 metre backstroke ===
Heats – August 12

Rank	Heat	Name	Nationality	Time	Notes
=1	2	Maximillian Wilson	Virgin Islands	55.41	Q
=1	3	Humberto Najera	Mexico	55.41	Q
3	1	Jack Harvey	Bermuda	55.74	Q
4	2	Noel Raekwon	Guyana	56.22	Q
5	1	Diego Camacho	Mexico	56.49	Q
6	2	Samuel Lopes	Brazil	56.51	Q
7	3	Ulises Saravia	Argentina	56.53	Q
8	1	Gabriel Arias	Colombia	57.05	Q
9	3	Anthony Piñeiro	Dominican Republic	57.11	q
10	1	Edhy Vargas	Chile	57.25	q
11	3	Matías Chaillou	Argentina	57.45	q
12	3	César Paredes	Venezuela	58.33	q
13	1	Johann-Mathew Matamoro	Trinidad and Tobago	58.51	q
14	2	Manuel Díaz	Venezuela	58.57	q
15	3	Ocean van Loon	Aruba	58.90	q
16	2	Bruno Heinichen	Paraguay	1:00.04	
17	2	Nigel Forbes	Bahamas	1:00.25	q
18	2	Siul Ayala	Puerto Rico	1:00.36	
19	1	Matías Vazquez	Uruguay	1:00.69	
20	1	Mateo Mascareño	Paraguay	1:01.59	
21	3	Kaeden Gleason	Virgin Islands	1:01.83	
22	2	Matthew Ballah	Saint Vincent and the Grenadines	1:02.12	
23	3	Mauricio Arias	Dominican Republic	1:02.33	

Final A – August 12

Rank	Name	Nationality	Time	Notes
1st place, gold medalist(s)	Ulises Saravia	Argentina	53.89	JPR
2nd place, silver medalist(s)	Maximillian Wilson	Virgin Islands	54.31	NR
3rd place, bronze medalist(s)	Jack Harvey	Bermuda	54.69	
4	Humberto Najera	Mexico	55.56	
5	Noel Raekwon	Guyana	55.72	NR
6	Samuel Lopes	Brazil	55.93	
7	Diego Camacho	Mexico	56.75	
8	Gabriel Arias	Colombia	57.26	

Final B – August 12

Rank	Name	Nationality	Time	Notes
9	Edhy Vargas	Chile	56.64	
10	Matías Chaillou	Argentina	56.82	
11	Anthony Piñeiro	Dominican Republic	57.07	
12	César Paredes	Venezuela	58.10	
13	Johann-Mathew Matamoro	Trinidad and Tobago	58.64	
14	Ocean van Loon	Aruba	59.00	
15	Bruno Heinichen	Paraguay	59.39	
16	Nigel Forbes	Bahamas	59.73	

=== 200 metre backstroke ===
Heats – August 11

Rank	Heat	Name	Nationality	Time	Notes
1	2	Humberto Najera	Mexico	2:02.74	Q
2	1	Samuel Lopes	Brazil	2:02.88	Q
3	1	Edhy Vargas	Chile	2:03.01	Q
4	2	Jack Harvey	Bermuda	2:03.85	Q
5	2	Rafael Arizpe	Mexico	2:03.99	Q
6	1	Gabriel Arias	Colombia	2:05.44	Q
7	1	José Materano	Argentina	2:06.28	Q
8	2	César Paredes	Venezuela	2:06.47	Q
9	2	Anthony Piñeiro	Dominican Republic	2:06.47	q
10	1	Matías Vazquez	Uruguay	2:11.27	q
11	2	Mateo Mascareño	Paraguay	2:12.11	q
12	2	Siul Ayala	Puerto Rico	2:15.41	q
13	1	Ocean van Loon	Aruba	2:16.04	q
14	2	Iván Correa	Paraguay	2:22.27	
	1	Erick Blandón	Nicaragua	DNS	

Final A – August 11

Rank	Name	Nationality	Time	Notes
1st place, gold medalist(s)	Humberto Najera	Mexico	1:57.44	JPR, NR
2nd place, silver medalist(s)	Samuel Lopes	Brazil	2:00.65	
3rd place, bronze medalist(s)	Edhy Vargas	Chile	2:00.85	
4	Jack Harvey	Bermuda	2:02.27	
5	Rafael Arizpe	Mexico	2:03.01	
6	Gabriel Arias	Colombia	2:04.41	
7	César Paredes	Venezuela	2:05.95	
	José Materano	Argentina	DSQ	

Final B – August 11

Rank	Name	Nationality	Time	Notes
9	Anthony Piñeiro	Dominican Republic	2:05.20	
10	Matías Vazquez	Uruguay	2:09.82	
11	Mateo Mascareño	Paraguay	2:12.06	
12	Ocean van Loon	Aruba	2:13.25	
13	Siul Ayala	Puerto Rico	2:15.50	

=== 100 metre breaststroke ===
Heats – August 10

Rank	Heat	Name	Nationality	Time	Notes
1	3	Xavier Ruiz	Puerto Rico	1:00.80	Q, JPR
2	2	Mariano Lazzerini	Chile	1:01.15	Q, NR
3	1	Guilherme Camossato	Brazil	1:02.13	Q
4	3	Juan José Giraldo	Colombia	1:02.37	Q
5	2	Collin McKenzie	Jamaica	1:02.68	Q
6	1	Kito Campbell	Jamaica	1:02.69	Q
7	2	Diego Resto	Puerto Rico	1:02.86	Q
8	3	Dante Nicola	Argentina	1:03.30	Q
9	1	Juan Diego León	Ecuador	1:03.45	q
10	1	Vicente Villanueva	Chile	1:03.67	q
11	2	Emmanuel Gadson	Bahamas	1:03.78	q
12	2	Javier Colmenares	Venezuela	1:03.79	q
13	3	Esteban Nuñez	Bolivia	1:04.01	q
14	1	Maximiliano Vega	Mexico	1:04.17	q
15	3	Maximiliano Benitez	Panama	1:04.22	q
16	1	Braynsly Dirksz	Aruba	1:05.50	q
17	3	Ej Daley	Bermuda	1:05.55	
18	2	Joshua Ross	Barbados	1:06.47	
19	3	Maximiliano Pedrozo	Paraguay	1:06.49	
20	2	Sam Williamson	Bermuda	1:07.23	

Final A – August 10

Rank	Name	Nationality	Time	Notes
1st place, gold medalist(s)	Xavier Ruiz	Puerto Rico	1:00.84	
2nd place, silver medalist(s)	Guilherme Camossato	Brazil	1:01.26	
3rd place, bronze medalist(s)	Collin McKenzie	Jamaica	1:01.53	NR
4	Mariano Lazzerini	Chile	1:01.57	
5	Juan José Giraldo	Colombia	1:02.64	
6	Diego Resto	Puerto Rico	1:02.78	
7	Kito Campbell	Jamaica	1:02.96	
8	Dante Nicola	Argentina	1:03.25	

Final B – August 10

Rank	Name	Nationality	Time	Notes
9	Vicente Villanueva	Chile	1:02.99	
10	Juan Diego León	Ecuador	1:03.45	
11	Javier Colmenares	Venezuela	1:03.96	
12	Esteban Nuñez	Bolivia	1:04.12	
13	Emmanuel Gadson	Bahamas	1:04.23	
14	Maximiliano Vega	Mexico	1:04.42	
15	Maximiliano Benitez	Panama	1:04.67	
16	Braynsly Dirksz	Aruba	1:05.31	

=== 200 metre breaststroke ===
Heats – August 11

Rank	Heat	Name	Nationality	Time	Notes
1	2	Roberto Bonilla	Guatemala	2:14.74	Q
2	2	Guilherme Camossato	Brazil	2:14.92	Q
3	1	Mariano Lazzerini	Chile	2:16.43	Q
4	2	Collin McKenzie	Jamaica	2:16.67	Q, NR
5	3	Diego Resto	Puerto Rico	2:17.56	Q
6	1	Juan José Giraldo	Colombia	2:17.57	Q
7	3	Maximiliano Vega	Mexico	2:18.07	
8	2	Emmanuel Gadson	Bahamas	2:18.52	Q
9	3	Vicente Villanueva	Chile	2:18.99	Q
10	1	Dante Nicola	Argentina	2:20.39	
11	3	Fernando Arce	Argentina	2:20.53	q
12	1	Juan Diego León	Ecuador	2:20.81	q
13	2	Javier Colmenares	Venezuela	2:21.36	q
14	1	Maximiliano Benitez	Panama	2:21.39	q
15	2	Joshua Ross	Barbados	2:25.19	q
16	3	Braynsly Dirksz	Aruba	2:28.37	
17	1	Sam Williamson	Bermuda	2:28.61	q
18	2	Ej Daley	Bermuda	2:28.85	q
19	1	Maximiliano Pedrozo	Paraguay	2:33.27	q
	3	Xavier Ruiz	Puerto Rico	DSQ	
	3	Kito Campbell	Jamaica	DSQ	

Final A – August 13

Rank	Name	Nationality	Time	Notes
1st place, gold medalist(s)	Roberto Bonilla	Guatemala	2:12.60	JPR, NR
2nd place, silver medalist(s)	Guilherme Camossato	Brazil	2:12.69	
3rd place, bronze medalist(s)	Mariano Lazzerini	Chile	2:14.23	
4	Juan José Giraldo	Colombia	2:15.28	
5	Diego Resto	Puerto Rico	2:16.61	
6	Collin McKenzie	Jamaica	2:16.69	
7	Vicente Villanueva	Chile	2:16.98	
8	Emmanuel Gadson	Bahamas	2:19.62	

Final B – August 13

Rank	Name	Nationality	Time	Notes
9	Javier Colmenares	Venezuela	2:20.02	
10	Juan Diego León	Ecuador	2:21.32	
11	Fernando Arce	Argentina	2:21.98	
12	Maximiliano Benitez	Panama	2:23.77	
13	Ej Daley	Bermuda	2:25.73	
14	Sam Williamson	Bermuda	2:26.97	
15	Maximiliano Pedrozo	Paraguay	2:32.88	
	Joshua Ross	Barbados	DNS	

=== 100 metre butterfly ===
Heats – August 11

Rank	Heat	Name	Nationality	Time	Notes
1	3	Lúcio Filho	Brazil	52.86	Q
2	4	Ulises Cazau	Argentina	53.01	Q
3	3	Gabriel Machuco	Brazil	53.75	Q
4	4	Diego Balbi	Peru	54.06	Q
=5	2	Andrés Brooks	Puerto Rico	54.20	Q
=5	4	Andres Dupont	Mexico	54.20	Q
7	4	Noel Raekwon	Guyana	54.23	Q
8	3	Elías Ardiles	Chile	54.51	Q
9	2	Jorge Otaiza	Venezuela	54.55	q
10	2	Esteban Nuñez	Bolivia	54.63	q
11	3	Emiliano Calle	Colombia	54.65	q
12	2	Nicolás Sobenes	Mexico	54.71	q
13	4	Manuel Díaz	Venezuela	54.93	q
14	3	Zarek Wilson	Trinidad and Tobago	54.99	q
15	3	Christian Jerome	Haiti	55.51	q
16	4	Javier Núñez	Dominican Republic	55.82	q
17	2	Ethan Stubbs-Green	Antigua and Barbuda	55.99	
18	2	Raphaël Grand'Pierre	Venezuela	56.46	
19	1	Johann-Mathew Matamoro	Trinidad and Tobago	56.53	
20	4	Ej Daley	Bermuda	56.65	
21	3	Ernesto González	Paraguay	56.74	
22	1	Iván Correa	Paraguay	56.86	
23	3	Marvin Johnson	Bahamas	56.90	
24	4	Tivon Benjamin	Antigua and Barbuda	56.96	
25	2	Nigel Forbes	Bahamas	57.36	
26	1	Kito Campbell	Jamaica	58.12	
27	1	Victor Ashby	Barbados	58.64	
28	1	Jenebi Benoit	Grenada	58.69	
29	1	Jonathan Essien	Saint Kitts and Nevis	1:00.52	
	2	Gerald Hernández	Nicaragua	DNS	

Final A – August 11

Rank	Name	Nationality	Time	Notes
1st place, gold medalist(s)	Lúcio Filho	Brazil	51.78	JPR
2nd place, silver medalist(s)	Ulises Cazau	Argentina	52.29	
3rd place, bronze medalist(s)	Diego Balbi	Peru	53.08	
4	Andres Dupont	Mexico	53.10	
5	Gabriel Machuco	Brazil	53.30	
6	Noel Raekwon	Guyana	53.39	NR
7	Andrés Brooks	Puerto Rico	54.18	
8	Elías Ardiles	Chile	54.56	

Final B – August 11

Rank	Name	Nationality	Time	Notes
9	Jorge Otaiza	Venezuela	52.91	
10	Nicolás Sobenes	Mexico	54.00	
11	Emiliano Calle	Colombia	54.30	
12	Esteban Nuñez	Bolivia	54.43	
13	Zarek Wilson	Trinidad and Tobago	54.56	
14	Christian Jerome	Haiti	55.39	
15	Manuel Díaz	Venezuela	55.71	
16	Javier Núñez	Dominican Republic	56.77	

=== 200 metre butterfly ===
Heats – August 10

Rank	Heat	Name	Nationality	Time	Notes
1	3	Gustavo Saldo	Brazil	1:59.46	Q
2	3	Andrés Brooks	Puerto Rico	2:01.08	Q
3	1	Noel Raekwon	Guyana	2:01.52	Q
4	2	Gabriel Moura	Brazil	2:01.86	Q
5	1	Diego Balbi	Peru	2:02.02	Q
6	3	Rafael Arizpe	Mexico	2:02.36	Q
7	2	Manuel Díaz	Venezuela	2:02.49	Q
8	2	Roberto Bonilla	Guatemala	2:02.79	Q
9	3	César Paredes	Venezuela	2:03.85	q
10	2	Rodrigo Ventura	El Salvador	2:04.57	q
11	3	Ethan Stubbs-Green	Antigua and Barbuda	2:05.60	q
12	1	Christian Jerome	Haiti	2:05.90	q
13	2	Nicolás Sobenes	Mexico	2:06.69	
14	2	Zachary Anthony	Trinidad and Tobago	2:08.80	
15	3	Adrián Ywanaga	Peru	2:12.07	q
16	1	Iván Correa	Paraguay	2:13.81	q
17	1	Ej Daley	Bermuda	2:15.91	q
18	3	Victor Ashby	Barbados	2:17.40	q
	1	Gerald Hernández	Nicaragua	DNS	

Final A – August 10

Rank	Name	Nationality	Time	Notes
1st place, gold medalist(s)	Gustavo Saldo	Brazil	1:58.95	JPR
2nd place, silver medalist(s)	Gabriel Moura	Brazil	1:59.45	
3rd place, bronze medalist(s)	Noel Raekwon	Guyana	1:59.46	NR
4	Andrés Brooks	Puerto Rico	2:01.06	
5	Rafael Arizpe	Mexico	2:01.15	
6	Roberto Bonilla	Guatemala	2:01.50	
7	Diego Balbi	Peru	2:01.85	
8	Manuel Díaz	Venezuela	2:02.90	

Final B – August 10

Rank	Name	Nationality	Time	Notes
9	Rodrigo Ventura	El Salvador	2:02.52	
10	Ethan Stubbs-Green	Antigua and Barbuda	2:03.74	
11	Christian Jerome	Haiti	2:05.44	
12	César Paredes	Venezuela	2:05.60	
13	Ej Daley	Bermuda	2:07.46	
14	Adrián Ywanaga	Peru	2:10.28	
15	Iván Correa	Paraguay	2:14.40	
16	Victor Ashby	Barbados	2:20.94	

=== 200 metre individual medley ===
Heats – August 14

Rank	Heat	Name	Nationality	Time	Notes
1	3	Stephan Steverink	Brazil	2:03.14	Q
2	2	Roberto Bonilla	Guatemala	2:03.71	Q
=3	2	Manuel Díaz	Venezuela	2:04.40	Q
=3	3	Xavier Ruiz	Puerto Rico	2:04.40	Q
5	3	Maximiliano Vega	Mexico	2:04.83	Q
6	2	Gabriel Machuco	Brazil	2:04.96	Q
7	3	Andrés Brooks	Puerto Rico	2:05.95	Q
8	1	Esteban Nuñez	Bolivia	2:06.66	Q
9	1	Fernando Arce	Argentina	2:08.04	Q
10	1	Juan Diego León	Ecuador	2.09.85	q
11	2	Javier Colmenares	Venezuela	2:10.05	q
12	2	Gabriel Arias	Colombia	2:10.21	q
13	1	Sam Williamson	Bermuda	2:11.05	q
14	1	Vicente Villanueva	Chile	2:11.12	q
15	3	Juan José Giraldo	Colombia	2:11.57	
16	2	Matías Vazquez	Uruguay	2:13.61	q
17	3	Ernesto González	Paraguay	2:14.50	q
18	3	Braynsly Dirksz	Aruba	2:15.22	q
19	1	Gerald Hernández	Nicaragua	2:19.52	q
	2	Maximiliano Benitez	Panama	DNS	
	1	Humberto Najera	Mexico	DSQ	

Final A – August 14

Rank	Name	Nationality	Time	Notes
1st place, gold medalist(s)	Roberto Bonilla	Guatemala	2:00.89	NR
2nd place, silver medalist(s)	Stephan Steverink	Brazil	2:01.83	
3rd place, bronze medalist(s)	Xavier Ruiz	Puerto Rico	2:02.66	
4	Gabriel Machuco	Brazil	2:03.18	
5	Maximiliano Vega	Mexico	2:03.49	
6	Andrés Brooks	Puerto Rico	2:04.24	
7	Manuel Díaz	Venezuela	2:04.36	
8	Fernando Arce	Argentina	2:06.95	
	Esteban Nuñez	Bolivia	DSQ	

Final B – August 14

Rank	Name	Nationality	Time	Notes
9	Vicente Villanueva	Chile	2:05.88	
10	Javier Colmenares	Venezuela	2:09.11	
11	Sam Williamson	Bermuda	2:10.68	
12	Braynsly Dirksz	Aruba	2:11.12	
13	Juan Diego León	Ecuador	2:12.45	
14	Matías Vazquez	Uruguay	2:12.87	
15	Ernesto González	Paraguay	2:14.45	
	Gerald Hernández	Nicaragua	DNS	

=== 400 metre individual medley ===
Heats – August 13

Rank	Heat	Name	Nationality	Time	Notes
1	1	Guilherme Kanzler	Brazil	4:24.79	Q
2	2	Stephan Steverink	Brazil	4:26.05	Q
3	1	Maximiliano Vega	Mexico	4:27.93	Q
4	1	Xavier Ruiz	Puerto Rico	4:28.42	Q
5	1	Rafael Arizpe	Mexico	4:29.72	Q
6	2	Roberto Bonilla	Guatemala	4:31.39	
7	2	Marcos D'Aurizio	Argentina	4:31.87	Q
8	2	Andrés Brooks	Puerto Rico	4:32.18	Q
9	2	Sebastián González	Venezuela	4:33.63	Q
10	1	Rodrigo Ventura	El Salvador	4:49.00	q
11	2	Sam Williamson	Bermuda	4:51.71	q
12	1	Manuel Díaz	Venezuela	4:55.83	
13	2	Matías Vazquez	Uruguay	5:06.17	q
14	1	Rodrigo Medina	Paraguay	5:13.02	q
15	2	Santiago Maciel	Paraguay	5:12.07	q

Final A – August 13

Rank	Name	Nationality	Time	Notes
1st place, gold medalist(s)	Stephan Steverink	Brazil	4:16.06	
2nd place, silver medalist(s)	Guilherme Kanzler	Brazil	4:18.15	
3rd place, bronze medalist(s)	Maximiliano Vega	Mexico	4:22.24	
4	Xavier Ruiz	Puerto Rico	4:24.03	
5	Rafael Arizpe	Mexico	4:25.96	
6	Andrés Brooks	Puerto Rico	4:26.27	
7	Marcos D'Aurizio	Argentina	4:32.47	
8	Sebastián González	Venezuela	4:34.24	

Final B – August 13

Rank	Name	Nationality	Time	Notes
9	Matías Vazquez	Uruguay	4:40.31	
10	Rodrigo Ventura	El Salvador	4:43.72	
11	Sam Williamson	Bermuda	4:45.39	
12	Rodrigo Medina	Paraguay	5:04.71	
13	Santiago Maciel	Paraguay	5:05.66	

=== 4 × 100 metre freestyle relay ===
Heats – August 10

Rank	Heat	Name	Time	Notes
1	2	Venezuela; Emil Pérez (50.79); Jorge Otaiza (51.37); Manuel Díaz (51.25); Dennis Pérez (50.47)	3:23.88	Q
2	2	Mexico; David Medina (51.38); Diego Camacho (50.95); José Alberto Cano (50.80); Alfredo Velázquez (50.83)	3:23.96	Q
3	2	Brazil; Lucio Flavio Filho (50.45); Samuel Lopes (51.52); João Pierre Campos (51.35); Gabriel Moura (50.77)	3:24.09	Q
4	2	Colombia; Santiago Arteaga (50.98); Gabriel Arias (53.81); Frank Solano (49.90); Sebastián Muñoz (51.88)	3:26.57	Q
5	1	Trinidad and Tobago; Nikoli Blackman (50.36); Zarek Wilson (51.48); Johann-Mathew Matamoro (51.94); Zachary Anthony (53.18)	3:26.96	Q
6	1	Argentina; Ulises Cazau (53.10); Fernando Arce (52.37); José Antonio Materano (52.61); Matías Santiso (49.11)	3:27.19	Q
7	1	Bahamas; Lamar Taylor (49.75); Emmanuel Gadson (54.70); Nigel Forbes (52.13); Marvin Johnson (50.75)	3:27.33	Q
8	1	Dominican Republic; Anthony Pineiro (51.44); Cristian Ramos (52.11); Mauricio Arias (52.87); Javier Núñez (51.16)	3:27.58	Q, NR
9	2	Puerto Rico; Caleb Romero (52.43); Andrés Brooks (51.19); José Nolla (52.64); Siul Ayala (53.81)	3:30.07	
10	1	Paraguay; Camilo Villalba (53.02); Bruno Heinichen (53.75); Laurent Barrios (53.86); José Matías Fleitas (55.00)	3:35.63	

Final A – August 10

Rank	Name	Time	Notes
1st place, gold medalist(s)	Brazil; Gabriel Machuco (50.07); Guilherme Caribé (48.59); Davi Zanella (50.28); Pedro Sansone (49.42)	3:18.36	JPR
2nd place, silver medalist(s)	Venezuela; Dennis Pérez (50.56); Jorge Otaiza (49.67); Manuel Díaz (50.66); Emil Pérez (49.49)	3:20.38	
3rd place, bronze medalist(s)	Trinidad and Tobago; Nikoli Blackman (49.18); Zarek Wilson (50.24); Johann-Mathew Matamoro (50.25); Zachary Anthony (50.98)	3:20.65	NR
4	Mexico; Andrés Dupont (48.83); Diego Camacho (50.42); David Medina (51.53); José Alberto Cano (50.54)	3:21.32	
5	Argentina; Ulises Saravia (51.08); Matías Chaillou (50.43); Máximo Aguilar (51.86); Matías Santiso (48.78)	3:22.15	
6	Bahamas; Lamar Taylor (49.01); Nigel Forbes (51.27); Emmanuel Gadson (53.84); Marvin Johnson (50.74)	3:24.86	NR
7	Colombia; Santiago Arteaga (50.67); Frank Solano (49.93); Sebastián Muñoz (51.36); Gabriel Arias (53.41)	3:25.37	
8	Dominican Republic; Javier Núñez (51.25); Anthony Pineiro (50.80); Cristian Ramos (52.36); Mauricio Arias (52.63)	3:27.04	NR

=== 4 × 200 metre freestyle relay ===
Final – August 13

Rank	Name	Time	Notes
1st place, gold medalist(s)	Brazil; Davi Zanella (1:51.01); Gabriel Moura (1:50.17); Gabriel Machuco (1:50.19); Stephan Steverink (1:47.12)	7:18.49	JPR
2nd place, silver medalist(s)	Mexico; Andrés Dupont (1:49.43); José Alberto Cano (1:51.74); Paulo Strehlke (1:50.48); David Medina (1:50.47)	7:22.12	
3rd place, bronze medalist(s)	Chile; Eduardo Cisternas (1:49.66); Mariano Lazzerini (1:51.65); Edhy Vargas (1:52.52); Elías Ardiles (1:52.43)	7:26.26	NR
4	Puerto Rico; José Nolla (1:51.58); Caleb Romero (1:51.82); Andrés Brooks (1:53.29); Xavier Ruiz (1:57.03)	7:33.72	
5	Argentina; Matías Chaillou (1:54.00); Máximo Aguilar (1:53.48); José Antonio Materano (1:55.92); Matías Santiso (1:55.72)	7:39.12	
6	Paraguay; Laurent Barrios (1:58.65); Ernesto González (1:58.99); Matías Fleitas (2:03.10); Camilo Villalba (2:00.48)	8:01.22	
7	Venezuela; Dennis Pérez; Emil Pérez; Jorge Otaiza; Raúl Briceño	DSQ	

=== 4 × 100 metre medley relay ===
Heats – August 14

Rank	Heat	Name	Time	Notes
1	2	Brazil; Samuel Lopes (56.27); Guilherme Camossato (1:01.85); Gustavo Saldo (54.15); Davi Zanella (51.31)	3:43.58	Q
2	1	Argentina; José Antonio Materano (57.75); Dante Nicola (1:02.88); Ulises Cazau (53.68); Matías Chaillou (50.76)	3:44.97	Q
3	1	Bahamas; Lamar Taylor (56.22 NR); Emmanuel Gadson (1:03.53); Nigel Forbes (55.04); Marvin Johnson (50.83)	3:45.26	Q, NR
4	1	Colombia; Gabriel Arias (56.88); Juan José Giraldo (1:03.76); Emiliano Calle (55.44); Frank Solano (50.83)	3:46.91	Q
5	1	Mexico; Diego Camacho (56.35); Marco Pat (1:04.21); Rafael Arizpe (55.54); Alfredo Velázquez (50.82)	3:46.97	Q
6	2	Venezuela; César Paredes (57.45); Javier Colmenares (1:04.66); Jorge Otaiza (54.36); Dennis Pérez (50.50)	3:46.97	Q
7	2	Chile; Edhy Vargas (56.54 NR); Vicente Villanueva (1:04.66); Elías Ardiles (54.62); Eduardo Cisternas (51.46)	3:47.28	Q
8	1	Dominican Republic; Anthony Pineiro (57.09); Pablo Solano (1:03.37); Javier Núñez (56.17); Cristian Ramos (51.95)	3:48.58	Q, NR
9	2	Puerto Rico; Siul Ayala (1:00.1); Diego Resto (1:03.21); Andrés Brooks (53.71); Caleb Romero (52.13)	3:49.16	
10	2	Paraguay; Bruno Heinichen (59.59); Maximiliano Pedrozo (1:05.13); Ernesto González (57.20); Camilo Villalba (52.75)	3:54.67	

Final A – August 14

Rank	Name	Time	Notes
1st place, gold medalist(s)	Argentina; Ulises Saravia (53.76); Dante Nicola (1:01.72); Ulises Cazau (52.53); Matías Chaillou (48.82)	3:36.53	JPR, NR
2nd place, silver medalist(s)	Brazil; Samuel Lopes (55.71); Guilherme Camossato (1:01.39); Lúcio Filho (52.06); Pedro Sansone (49.43)	3:38.59	
3rd place, bronze medalist(s)	Mexico; Humberto Najera (55.10); Marco Pat (1:03.55); Nicolás Sobenes (53.42); Andrés Dupont (48.43)	3:40.50	
4	Colombia; Gabriel Arias (56.08); Juan José Giraldo (1:02.16); Emiliano Calle (53.26); Frank Solano (49.63)	3:41.13	
5	Chile; Edhy Vargas (56.71); Vicente Villanueva (1:00.77); Elías Ardiles (53.32); Eduardo Cisternas (50.88)	3:41.68	NR
6	Venezuela; César Paredes (57.46); Javier Colmenares (1:04.59); Jorge Otaiza (52.44); Dennis Pérez (49.94)	3:44.43	
7	Bahamas; Lamar Taylor (56.61); Emmanuel Gadson (1:03.77); Nigel Forbes (54.68); Marvin Johnson (50.58)	3:45.64	
8	Dominican Republic; Anthony Pineiro; Pablo Solano; Javier Núñez; Cristian Ramos	DSQ	

== Women's results ==
=== 50 metre freestyle ===
Heats – August 13

Rank	Heat	Name	Nationality	Time	Notes
1	5	Stephanie Balduccini	Brazil	25.75	Q
2	4	Isabella Bedoya	Colombia	25.77	Q
3	4	Beatriz Bezerra	Brazil	25.98	Q
4	3	Angelina Solari	Uruguay	26.05	Q
5	5	Sabrina Lyn	Jamaica	26.30	Q
6	4	Christanya Shirley	Jamaica	26.41	Q
7	5	Chloe Farro	Aruba	26.63	Q
8	3	Andrea Becali	Cuba	26.75	Q
9	3	María Mendez	Mexico	26.79	q
10	3	Daniela Pacheco	Venezuela	26.85	q
11	4	Laurent Estrada	Cuba	26.94	q
12	3	Fabiana Pesce	Venezuela	27.15	q
13	5	Luna Chabat	Uruguay	27.15	q
14	1	Lila Higgo	Cayman Islands	27.17	q
15	5	Belén Morales	Guatemala	27.23	q
16	3	Adriana Giles	Bolivia	27.31	q
17	4	Darielys Ortiz	Dominican Republic	27.34	
18	3	Aunjelique Liddie	Antigua and Barbuda	27.42	
19	5	María Santana	Colombia	27.45	
20	5	Zoe Williamson	Bahamas	27.56	
21	2	Fiorella Mateos	Paraguay	27.60	
22	2	Marleigh Howes	Bermuda	27.62	
23	4	Hadassah Tompkins	Mexico	27.63	
24	2	María Castillo	Panama	27.64	
25	5	Amari Ash	Trinidad and Tobago	27.69	
26	2	Alanis Santiago	Puerto Rico	27.71	
27	2	Davia Richardson	Belize	27.73	
28	2	Jimena Rodríguez	Costa Rica	27.81	
29	1	Ariel Rodrigues	Guyana	27.83	
30	3	Riley Miller	Virgin Islands	27.83	
31	1	Shareefah Lewis	Guyana	28.04	
32	4	Elena Amos	El Salvador	28.04	
33	2	Constanza Areco	Paraguay	28.45	
34	1	Andrea Gutiérrez	Nicaragua	28.86	
35	1	Anika Otway	Grenada	28.91	
36	1	Mayah Chouloute	Haiti	29.11	
37	1	Sophia Zapata	Nicaragua	29.31	
38	1	Jasmine Schofield	Dominica	29.43	
39	2	Eva Andrade	Ecuador	DNS	
40	4	Avi Tromp	Aruba	DNS	

Final A – August 13

Rank	Name	Nationality	Time	Notes
1st place, gold medalist(s)	Stephanie Balduccini	Brazil	25.42	JPR
1st place, gold medalist(s)	Isabella Bedoya	Colombia	25.42	JPR
3rd place, bronze medalist(s)	Beatriz Bezerra	Brazil	25.62	
4	Angelina Solari	Uruguay	25.74	
5	Sabrina Lyn	Jamaica	26.01	
6	Christanya Shirley	Jamaica	26.08	
7	Chloe Farro	Aruba	26.36	
8	Andrea Becali	Cuba	26.39	

Final B – August 13

Rank	Name	Nationality	Time	Notes
9	Lila Higgo	Cayman Islands	26.56	
10	María Mendez	Mexico	26.67	
11	Daniela Pacheco	Venezuela	26.74	
12	Adriana Giles	Bolivia	26.78	
13	Belén Morales	Guatemala	26.97	
14	Laurent Estrada	Cuba	26.99	
15	Fabiana Pesce	Venezuela	27.02	
16	Luna Chabat	Uruguay	27.10	

=== 100 metre freestyle ===
Heats – August 12

Rank	Heat	Name	Nationality	Time	Notes
1	6	Stephanie Balduccini	Brazil	55.93	Q
2	4	Isabella Bedoya	Colombia	56.77	Q
3	4	Angelina Solari	Uruguay	56.80	Q
4	5	María Yegres	Venezuela	56.89	Q
5	5	Beatriz Bezerra	Brazil	57.14	Q
6	6	Andrea Becali	Cuba	57.25	Q
7	5	Lucía Gauna	Argentina	57.26	Q
8	6	Celia Pulido	Mexico	57.71	
9	6	Heidi Stoute	Barbados	57.90	Q
10	5	Belén Morales	Guatemala	58.17	q
11	4	Sabrina Lyn	Jamaica	58.30	q
12	4	Chloe Farro	Aruba	58.42	q
13	5	María Mendez	Mexico	58.44	
14	4	María Santana	Colombia	58.65	q
15	6	Eva Andrade	Ecuador	58.93	q
16	4	Christanya Shirley	Jamaica	58.94	q
17	6	Zoe Williamson	Bahamas	59.50	q
18	3	Darielys Ortiz	Dominican Republic	59.62	q
19	3	Elyse Wood	Bahamas	59.63	
20	6	Aunjelique Liddie	Antigua and Barbuda	59.79	
21	3	Constanza Areco	Paraguay	59.84	
22	5	Lucianna Gutiérrez	Puerto Rico	59.89	
23	3	María Castillo	Panama	59.93	
24	3	Fiorella Mateos	Paraguay	59.94	
25	3	Jimena Rodríguez	Costa Rica	59.99	
26	3	Avi Tromp	Aruba	1:00.11	
27	4	Marleigh Howes	Bermuda	1:00.32	
28	6	Adriana Giles	Bolivia	1:00.34	
29	4	Layra Pagan	Puerto Rico	1:00.68	
30	2	Davia Richardson	Belize	1:00.73	
31	5	Elvira Espinosa	Ecuador	1:00.77	
32	3	Elena Amos	El Salvador	1:00.86	
33	5	Riley Miller	Virgin Islands	1:00.95	
34	1	Ariel Rodrigues	Guyana	1:01.82	
35	2	Lu Joseph	Virgin Islands	1:02.33	
36	2	Amari Ash	Trinidad and Tobago	1:02.35	
37	2	Karina Solera	Costa Rica	1:03.29	
38	2	Jasmine Schofield	Dominica	1:04.05	
39	2	Shareefah Lewis	Guyana	1:04.39	
=40	2	Dailyn Benítez	Honduras	1:04.58	
=40	2	Anika Otway	Grenada	1:04.58	
42	1	Mayah Chouloute	Haiti	1:04.75	
43	1	Amazya Macrooy	Suriname	1:07.89	

Final A – August 12

Rank	Name	Nationality	Time	Notes
1st place, gold medalist(s)	Stephanie Balduccini	Brazil	54.91	
2nd place, silver medalist(s)	Isabella Bedoya	Colombia	56.13	
3rd place, bronze medalist(s)	Angelina Solari	Uruguay	56.27	
4	Beatriz Bezerra	Brazil	56.28	
5	María Yegres	Venezuela	56.46	
6	Andrea Becali	Cuba	57.17	
7	Lucía Gauna	Argentina	57.19	
8	Heidi Stoute	Barbados	57.56	

Final B – August 12

Rank	Name	Nationality	Time	Notes
9	Sabrina Lyn	Jamaica	57.35	
10	Belén Morales	Guatemala	57.50	
11	Chloe Farro	Aruba	57.82	
12	María Santana	Colombia	58.43	
13	Zoe Williamson	Bahamas	58.83	
14	Eva Andrade	Ecuador	58.93	
15	Christanya Shirley	Jamaica	59.00	
16	Darielys Ortiz	Dominican Republic	59.32	

=== 200 metre freestyle ===
Heats – August 11

Rank	Heat	Name	Nationality	Time	Notes
1	4	Stephanie Balduccini	Brazil	2:01.50	Q
2	3	María Yegres	Venezuela	2:01.85	Q
3	4	Fernanda Celidonio	Brazil	2:03.21	Q
4	3	Tiffany Murillo	Colombia	2:04.01	Q
5	2	Fernanda Elizondo	Mexico	2:05.18	Q
6	3	Heidi Stoute	Barbados	2:06.39	Q
7	2	Andrea Becali	Cuba	2:06.61	Q
8	2	Kyra Robess	Cayman Islands	2:06.98	Q
9	4	Lucía Gauna	Argentina	2:07.08	q
10	2	Nicole Frank	Uruguay	2:07.16	
11	4	María Santana	Colombia	2:07.32	q
12	4	Jimena Rodríguez	Costa Rica	2:07.48	q
13	2	Belén Morales	Guatemala	2:07.81	q
14	3	Andrea González	Mexico	2:08.03	q
15	4	Eva Andrade	Ecuador	2:08.08	q
16	3	Micaela Mazzari	Costa Rica	2:08.21	q
17	3	Alanis Santiago	Puerto Rico	2:08.50	q
18	4	Paola Azzato	Venezuela	2:09.23	q
19	4	Constanza Areco	Paraguay	2:10.58	
20	3	Harper Barrowman	Cayman Islands	2:11.96	
21	2	Chloe Farro	Aruba	2:12.01	
22	2	Lucianna Gutiérrez	Puerto Rico	2:12.07	
23	1	Lorie Rojas	Bolivia	2:12.24	
24	3	Marleigh Howes	Bermuda	2:13.51	
25	1	Zoe Williamson	Bahamas	2:15.71	
26	2	Cielo Peralta	Paraguay	2:16.26	
27	1	Lu Joseph	Virgin Islands	2:17.08	
28	1	Dailyn Benítez	Honduras	2:20.32	
29	1	Sophia Zapata	Nicaragua	DNS	

Final A – August 11

Rank	Name	Nationality	Time	Notes
1st place, gold medalist(s)	Stephanie Balduccini	Brazil	1:58.83	
2nd place, silver medalist(s)	María Yegres	Venezuela	2:00.68	
3rd place, bronze medalist(s)	Tiffany Murillo	Colombia	2:01.82	
4	Fernanda Celidonio	Brazil	2:02.53	
5	Heidi Stoute	Barbados	2:04.61	
6	Fernanda Elizondo	Mexico	2:04.61	
7	Kyra Robess	Cayman Islands	2:04.99	
8	Andrea Becali	Cuba	2:05.16	

Final B – August 11

Rank	Name	Nationality	Time	Notes
9	María Santana	Colombia	2:05.24	
10	Alanis Santiago	Puerto Rico	2:05.41	
11	Paola Azzato	Venezuela	2:05.93	
12	Belén Morales	Guatemala	2:06.23	
13	Micaela Mazzari	Costa Rica	2:06.61	
14	Jimena Rodríguez	Costa Rica	2:07.19	
15	Andrea González	Mexico	2:08.10	
16	Eva Andrade	Ecuador	2:08.62	

=== 400 metre freestyle ===
Heats – August 10

Rank	Heat	Name	Nationality	Time	Notes
1	3	Agostina Hein	Argentina	4:13.41	Q, JPR
2	3	Letícia Romão	Brazil	4:17.03	Q
3	3	Carolina Daher	Brazil	4:17.79	Q
4	2	Tiffany Murillo	Colombia	4:18.31	Q
5	3	María Yegres	Venezuela	4:19.08	Q
6	2	Sharon Guerrero	Mexico	4:20.48	Q
7	2	Fernanda Elizondo	Mexico	4:21.46	Q
8	3	Heidi Stoute	Barbados	4:27.10	Q
9	3	Paola Azzato	Venezuela	4:27.38	q
10	2	Kyra Rabess	Cayman Islands	4:27.78	q
11	2	Harper Barrowman	Cayman Islands	4:29.74	q
12	2	Lucianna Gutiérrez	Puerto Rico	4:30.85	q
13	3	Lucero Mejía	Guatemala	4:31.82	q
14	2	Nicole Centeno	Costa Rica	4:34.17	q
15	3	Yuliana Ortiz	Costa Rica	4:35.22	q
16	2	Cielo Peralta	Paraguay	4:38.89	q
17	1	Luciana Codas	Paraguay	4:39.21	
18	1	Lu Joseph	Virgin Islands	4:52.04	
19	1	Dailyn Benítez	Honduras	4:54.08	

Final A – August 10

Rank	Name	Nationality	Time	Notes
1st place, gold medalist(s)	Agostina Hein	Argentina	4:06.96	JPR
2nd place, silver medalist(s)	Letícia Romão	Brazil	4:14.29	
3rd place, bronze medalist(s)	Tiffany Murillo	Colombia	4:14.58	NR
4	Carolina Daher	Brazil	4:15.78	
5	María Yegres	Venezuela	4:16.46	
6	Fernanda Elizondo	Mexico	4:20.35	
7	Sharon Guerrero	Mexico	4:21.50	
8	Heidi Stoute	Barbados	4:27.45	

Final B – August 10

Rank	Name	Nationality	Time	Notes
9	Kyra Rabess	Cayman Islands	4:23.89	
10	Nicole Centeno	Costa Rica	4:28.58	
11	Paola Azzato	Venezuela	4:28.98	
12	Lucero Mejía	Guatemala	4:29.77	
13	Yuliana Ortiz	Costa Rica	4:29.89	
14	Lucianna Gutiérrez	Puerto Rico	4:30.47	
15	Harper Barrowman	Cayman Islands	4:31.85	
16	Cielo Peralta	Paraguay	4:36.79	

=== 800 metre freestyle ===
Final 1 – August 12

Rank	Name	Nationality	Time	Notes
1	Andrea González	Puerto Rico	9:28.60	
2	Cielo Peralta	Paraguay	9:29.45	
3	Cecilia Piraino	Paraguay	9:55.29	

Final 2 – August 12

Rank	Name	Nationality	Time	Notes
1	Mariana Cote	Venezuela	8:57.00	
2	Yuritzi Salgado	Mexico	8:59.33	
3	Montserrat Spielmann	Chile	9:09.71	
4	Nicole Centeno	Costa Rica	9:12.21	
5	Harper Barrowman	Cayman Islands	9:27.64	
6	Yuliana Ortiz	Costa Rica	9:29.43	

Medal Final – August 12

Rank	Name	Nationality	Time	Notes
1st place, gold medalist(s)	Leticia Romão	Brazil	8:40.88	
2nd place, silver medalist(s)	Tiffany Murillo	Colombia	8:48.35	
3rd place, bronze medalist(s)	Sharon Guerrero	Mexico	8:49.46	
4	Leticia Silva	Brazil	8:59.67	
5	Kyra Rabess	Cayman Islands	9:00.76	
6	María Yegres	Venezuela	9:01.53	
7	Martina Urgelles	Argentina	9:07.83	
8	Lucianna Gutiérrez	Puerto Rico	9:35.43	

=== 1500 metre freestyle ===
Final – August 14

Rank	Name	Nationality	Time	Notes
1	Paola Azzato	Venezuela	17:35.09	
2	Yuliana Ortiz	Costa Rica	18:30.64	
3	Cielo Peralta	Paraguay	18:52.02	
4	Cecilia Piraino	Paraguay	19:"2.56	

Medal Final – August 12

Rank	Name	Nationality	Time	Notes
1st place, gold medalist(s)	Leticia Romão	Brazil	16:30.86	
2nd place, silver medalist(s)	Tiffany Murillo	Colombia	16:48.89	
3rd place, bronze medalist(s)	Mariana de Oliveira	Brazil	16:49.95	
4	Sharon Guerrero	Mexico	16:50.14	
5	Yuritzi Salgado	Mexico	16:57.20	
6	Martina Urgelles	Argentina	17:10.50	
7	Mariana Cote	Venezuela	17:16.83	
8	Nicole Centeno	Costa Rica	17:44.29	

=== 100 metre backstroke ===
Heats – August 13

Rank	Heat	Name	Nationality	Time	Notes
1	4	Celia Pulido	Mexico	1:02.90	Q
2	3	Lila Higgo	Cayman Islands	1:03.35	Q
3	2	Júlia Ferreiro	Brazil	1:03.40	Q
4	3	Laurent Estrada	Cuba	1:03.62	Q
5	3	Lucero Mejía	Guatemala	1:03.70	Q
6	4	Zuri Ferguson	Trinidad and Tobago	1:03.72	Q
7	2	Cecilia Dieleke	Argentina	1:03.80	Q
8	4	Elizabeth Jiménez	Dominican Republic	1:03.87	Q
9	3	Melissa Diego	Guatemala	1:04.07	
10	2	Malena Santillán	Argentina	1:04.53	q
11	2	Sophia Penteriche	Brazil	1:04.61	q
12	3	María Contreras	Ecuador	1:05.07	q
13	4	Isabella Budnik	Colombia	1:05.08	q
14	2	Daryll Pereira	Uruguay	1:05.77	q
15	3	Lara Giménez	Paraguay	1:07.02	q
16	2	Nicole Christensen	Venezuela	1:07.20	q
17	4	Luna Chabat	Uruguay	1:07.52	q
18	4	Cristhiane Añasco	Paraguay	1:07.59	
19	1	Madison Mac Millan	Antigua and Barbuda	1:08.31	NR
20	4	Eva Andrade	Ecuador	1:08.52	
=21	3	Riley Watson	Cayman Islands	1:08.54	
=21	2	Martina Roper	Chile	1:08.54	
23	2	Lorie Rojas	Bolivia	1:08.62	
24	3	Riley Miller	Virgin Islands	1:09.06	
25	4	Layra Pagan	Puerto Rico	1:09.12	
26	1	Sophia Zapata	Nicaragua	1:10.18	
27	1	Ariel Rodrigues	Guyana	1:12.39	
28	1	Shareefah Lewis	Guyana	1:14.55	

Final A – August 13

Rank	Name	Nationality	Time	Notes
1st place, gold medalist(s)	Celia Pulido	Mexico	1:00.82	JPR
2nd place, silver medalist(s)	Cecilia Dieleke	Argentina	1:01.22	
3rd place, bronze medalist(s)	Júlia Ferreiro	Brazil	1:02.82	
4	Lila Higgo	Cayman Islands	1:02.90	
5	Zuri Ferguson	Trinidad and Tobago	1:03.28	
6	Laurent Estrada	Cuba	1:03.32	
7	Lucero Mejía	Guatemala	1:03.68	
8	Elizabeth Jiménez	Dominican Republic	1:03.74	

Final B – August 13

Rank	Name	Nationality	Time	Notes
9	Malena Santillán	Argentina	1:02.87	
10	Isabella Budnik	Colombia	1:05.34	
11	María Contreras	Ecuador	1:05.68	
12	Daryll Pereira	Uruguay	1:05.78	
13	Sophia Penteriche	Brazil	1:05.82	
14	Luna Chabat	Uruguay	1:06.69	
15	Lara Giménez	Paraguay	1:06.78	
16	Nicole Christensen	Venezuela	1:06.84	

=== 200 metre backstroke ===
Heats – August 11

Rank	Heat	Name	Nationality	Time	Notes
1	3	Celia Pulido	Mexico	2:13.10	Q, JPR
2	3	Malena Santillán	Argentina	2:15.84	Q
3	2	Cecilia Dieleke	Argentina	2:15.99	Q
4	1	Zuri Ferguson	Trinidad and Tobago	2:16.15	Q
5	2	Laurent Estrada	Cuba	2:17.00	Q
6	1	Isabella Budnik	Colombia	2:18.39	Q
7	3	Elizabeth Jiménez	Dominican Republic	2:19.42	Q
8	3	Mariana de Oliveira	Brazil	2:19.51	Q
9	2	Lucero Mejía	Guatemala	2:20.45	q
10	1	Melissa Diego	Guatemala	2:20.90	q
11	1	María Contreras	Ecuador	2:21.34	q
12	2	Mónica Leydar	Venezuela	2:22.69	q
13	2	Daryll Pereira	Uruguay	2:23.48	q
14	1	Martina Roper	Chile	2:24.13	q
15	2	Sophia Penteriche	Brazil	2:24.15	q
16	1	Nicole Christensen	Venezuela	2:24.24	q
17	3	Lara Giménez	Paraguay	2:27.69	
18	3	Madison Mac Millan	Antigua and Barbuda	2:28.65	NR
19	3	Luna Chabat	Uruguay	2:29.46	
20	3	Layra Pagan	Puerto Rico	2:29.85	
21	2	Riley Watson	Cayman Islands	2:30.36	
22	1	Cristhiane Añasco	Paraguay	2:34.84	

Final A – August 11

Rank	Name	Nationality	Time	Notes
1st place, gold medalist(s)	Malena Santillán	Argentina	2:10.36	JPR, SA
2nd place, silver medalist(s)	Celia Pulido	Mexico	2:11.67	
3rd place, bronze medalist(s)	Cecilia Dieleke	Argentina	2:11.92	
4	Zuri Ferguson	Trinidad and Tobago	2:16.07	
5	Elizabeth Jiménez	Dominican Republic	2:18.65	
6	Isabella Budnik	Colombia	2:19.33	
7	Laurent Estrada	Cuba	2:20.12	
8	Mariana de Oliveira	Brazil	2:20.72	

Final B – August 11

Rank	Name	Nationality	Time	Notes
9	Lucero Mejía	Guatemala	2:17.49	
10	Sophia Penteriche	Brazil	2:21.13	
11	Mónica Leydar	Venezuela	2:21.50	
12	Melissa Diego	Guatemala	2:22.04	
13	María Contreras	Ecuador	2:22.31	
14	Nicole Christensen	Venezuela	2:23.01	
15	Martina Roper	Chile	2:23.27	
16	Daryll Pereira	Uruguay	2:24.19	

=== 100 metre breaststroke ===
Heats – August 10

Rank	Heat	Name	Nationality	Time	Notes
1	3	Emily Santos	Panama	1:08.55	Q, JPR
2	3	Sabrina Lyn	Jamaica	1:09.58	Q
3	2	Stefanía Gómez	Colombia	1:09.92	Q
4	1	Nichelly Lysy	Brazil	1:10.09	Q
5	1	Nicole Frank	Uruguay	1:11.38	Q
6	2	Avi Tromp	Aruba	1:12.47	Q
7	1	Catalina Acacio	Argentina	1:12.64	Q
8	3	Bilu Bianchi	Uruguay	1:!2.98	Q
9	1	Mariana Ortega	Mexico	1:13.09	q
10	3	Marielys Martínez	Venezuela	1:13.18	q
11	3	Elyse Wood	Bahamas	1:13.44	q
12	2	María José Sánchez	Mexico	1:13.60	q
13	2	Stephanie Iannaccone	Guatemala	1:13.66	q
14	2	Andrea Perea	Puerto Rico	1:14.35	q
15	3	Micaela Mazzari	Costa Rica	1:15.93	q
16	1	Astrid Caballero	Paraguay	1:16.27	q
17	1	Heather Allison	Paraguay	1:19.18	
18	2	Anaika Otway	Grenada	1:20.37	
19	1	Alejandra Alvarado	Guatemala	1:20.75	
20	2	Sairy Escalante	Honduras	1:21.80	
	3	Fernanda Celidônio	Brazil	DSQ	

Final A – August 10

Rank	Name	Nationality	Time	Notes
1st place, gold medalist(s)	Emily Santos	Panama	1:08.44	
2nd place, silver medalist(s)	Sabrina Lyn	Jamaica	1:09.00	
3rd place, bronze medalist(s)	Stefanía Gómez	Colombia	1:09.56	
4	Nichelly Lysy	Brazil	1:09.85	
5	Nicole Frank	Uruguay	1:10.82	
6	Bilu Bianchi	Uruguay	1:12.90	
7	Catalina Acacio	Argentina	1:13.19	
8	Avi Tromp	Aruba	1:13.20	

Final B – August 10

Rank	Name	Nationality	Time	Notes
9	Mariana Ortega	Mexico	1:12.07	
10	Marielys Martínez	Venezuela	1:21.31	
=11	María José Sánchez	Mexico	1:12.69	
=11	Stephanie Iannaccone	Guatemala	1:12.69	
13	Elyse Wood	Bahamas	1:14.16	
14	Andrea Perea	Puerto Rico	1:14.33	
15	Micaela Mazzari	Costa Rica	1:15.28	
16	Astrid Caballero	Paraguay	1:16.56	

=== 200 metre breaststroke ===
Heats – August 12

Rank	Heat	Name	Nationality	Time	Notes
1	22	Agatha Amaral	Brazil	2:32.43	Q
2	1	Nicole Frank	Uruguay	2:37.94	Q
3	1	Nichelly Lysy	Brazil	2:38.05	Q
4	2	Stephanie Iannaccone	Brazil	2:38.64	Q
5	2	Mariana Ortega	Mexico	2:38.99	Q
6	1	Marielys Martínez	Venezuela	2:40.30	Q
7	1	Stefanía Gómez	Colombia	2:41.04	Q
8	2	Bilu Bianchi	Uruguay	2:41.13	Q
9	2	Andrea Perea	Puerto Rico	2:42.99	q
10	1	María José Sánchez	Mexico	2:44.45	q
11	2	Micaela Mazzari	Costa Rica	2:40.03	q
12	1	Astrid Caballero	Paraguay	2:52.30	q
13	1	Alejandra Alvarado	Guatemala	2:57.00	q
14	1	Heather Allison	Paraguay	3:00.97	q
15	2	Sairy Escalante	Honduras	3:03.18	q
	2	Emily Santos	Panama	DSQ	

Final A – August 12

Rank	Name	Nationality	Time	Notes
1st place, gold medalist(s)	Agatha Amaral	Brazil	2:30.09	
2nd place, silver medalist(s)	Emily Santos	Panama	2:30.17	
3rd place, bronze medalist(s)	Nichelly Lysy	Brazil	2:33.72	
4	Nicole Frank	Uruguay	2:34.50	
5	Stefanía Gómez	Colombia	2:35.51	
6	Mariana Ortega	Mexico	2:36.72	
7	Stephanie Iannaccone	Brazil	2:37.39	
8	Marielys Martínez	Venezuela	2:40.34	
	Bilu Bianchi	Uruguay	DSQ	

Final B – August 12

Rank	Name	Nationality	Time	Notes
9	María José Sánchez	Mexico	2:40.23	
10	Andrea Perea	Puerto Rico	2:40.87	
11	Micaela Mazzari	Costa Rica	2:43.29	
12	Astrid Caballero	Paraguay	2:51.52	
13	Heather Allison	Paraguay	2:54.06	
14	Alejandra Alvarado	Guatemala	2:57.75	
15	Sairy Escalante	Honduras	3:03.12	

=== 100 metre butterfly ===
Heats – August 13

Rank	Heat	Name	Nationality	Time	Notes
1	3	Joice Rocha	Brazil	1:00.74	Q
2	4	Samantha Baños	Colombia	1:00.95	Q
3	4	Beatriz Bezerra	Brazil	1:01.06	Q
4	2	María Mendez	Mexico	1:01.44	Q
5	2	Emma Sabando	Ecuador	1:01.77	Q
6	3	Montserrat Spielmann	Chile	1:02.55	Q
7	3	Avi Tromp	Aruba	1:03.00	Q
8	4	Elyse Wood	Bahamas	1:03.14	Q
9	2	Mónica Leydar	Venezuela	1:03.31	q
10	3	Stephanie Iannaccone	Guatemala	1:03.49	q
11	3	Karina Solera	Costa Rica	1:03.66	q
12	4	Elvira Espinosa	Ecuador	1:03.83	q
13	2	Alexandria Cotter	Puerto Rico	1:04.01	q
14	4	Sabrina Lyn	Jamaica	1:04.60	q
15	1	Christanya Shirley	Jamaica	1:04.89	q
16	3	Jaiya Simmons	Barbados	1:04.93	q
17	4	Yasmin Silva	Peru	1:05.18	
18	3	María Santana	Colombia	1:05.49	
19	2	Darielys Ortiz	Dominican Republic	1:05.65	
20	2	Davia Richardson	Belize	1:05.65	
21	4	Sara Dowden	Grenada	1:05.81	
22	2	Vanessa Alvarado	Puerto Rico	1:06.08	
23	4	Lila Higgo	Cayman Islands	1:06.69	
24	2	Astrid Caballero	Paraguay	1:06.81	
25	1	Aunjelique Liddie	Antigua and Barbuda	1:07.15	
26	3	Zoe Williamson	Bahamas	1:07.76	
27	1	Ornella Giuliano	Uruguay	1:08.98	
28	1	Harumi Baigorria	Paraguay	1:13.04	
29	1	Amazya MacRooy	Suriname	1:15.30	
30	1	Maya Chouloute	Haiti	1:20.02	
31	1	Andrea Gutiérrez	Nicaragua	DNS	

Final A – August 13

Rank	Name	Nationality	Time	Notes
1st place, gold medalist(s)	Joice Rocha	Brazil	59.70	
2nd place, silver medalist(s)	Beatriz Bezerra	Brazil	59.82	
3rd place, bronze medalist(s)	María Mendez	Mexico	1:00.73	
4	Samantha Baños	Colombia	1:00.75	
5	Montserrat Spielmann	Chile	1:01.52	
6	Emma Sabando	Ecuador	1:02.06	
7	Avi Tromp	Aruba	1:02.71	NR
8	Elyse Wood	Bahamas	1:03.37	

Final B – August 13

Rank	Name	Nationality	Time	Notes
9	Elvira Espinosa	Ecuador	1:02.50	
10	Sabrina Lyn	Jamaica	1:02.77	
11	Mónica Leydar	Venezuela	1:03.08	
12	Stephanie Iannaccone	Guatemala	1:03.45	
13	Karina Solera	Costa Rica	1:04.01	
14	Christanya Shirley	Jamaica	1:04.46	
15	Alexandria Cotter	Puerto Rico	1:04.57	
16	Jaiya Simmons	Barbados	1:05.05	

=== 200 metre butterfly ===
Heats – August 10

Rank	Heat	Name	Nationality	Time	Notes
1	1	Samantha Baños	Colombia	2:14.37	Q
2	1	Magdalena Portela	Argentina	2:14.93	Q
3	2	Ana Julia Amaral	Brazil	2:15.24	Q
4	2	Mónica Leydar	Venezuela	2:16.96	Q
5	2	Elvira Espinosa	Ecuador	2:17.18	Q
6	1	Yasmin Silva	Peru	2:18.20	Q
7	2	Isabella Chávez	Mexico	2:19.13	Q
8	1	Paulina Hernández	Mexico	2:20.04	Q
9	2	Joice Otero	Brazil	2:21.41	q
10	2	Montserrat Spielmann	Chile	2:21.63	q
11	1	Jaiya Simmons	Barbados	2:26.53	q
12	1	Vanessa Alvarado	Puerto Rico	2:27.45	q
13	2	Ornella Giuliano	Uruguay	2:27.46	q
14	1	Michelle Weingartshofer	Paraguay	2:42.16	q
15	2	Harumi Baigorria	Paraguay	2:46.46	q
	1	Karina Solera	Costa Rica	DNS	

Final A – August 10

Rank	Name	Nationality	Time	Notes
1st place, gold medalist(s)	Ana Julia Amaral	Brazil	2:13.08	JPR
2nd place, silver medalist(s)	Samantha Baños	Colombia	2:13.53	
3rd place, bronze medalist(s)	Yasmin Silva	Peru	2:13.57	
4	Mónica Leydar	Venezuela	2:13.98	
5	Magdalena Portela	Argentina	2:14.32	
6	Elvira Espinosa	Ecuador	2:17.05	
7	Isabella Chávez	Mexico	2:19.57	
8	Paulina Hernández	Mexico	2:20.10	

Final B – August 10

Rank	Name	Nationality	Time	Notes
9	Joice Otero	Brazil	2:16.53	
10	Montserrat Spielmann	Chile	2:20.57	
11	Jaiya Simmons	Barbados	2:23.95	
12	Vanessa Alvarado	Puerto Rico	2:27.85	
13	Ornella Giuliano	Uruguay	2:30.01	
14	Harumi Baigorria	Paraguay	2:38.84	
15	Michelle Weingartshofer	Paraguay	2:39.75	

=== 200 metre individual medley ===
Heats – August 14

Rank	Heat	Name	Nationality	Time	Notes
1	3	Agostina Hein	Argentina	2:17.70	Q
2	3	Fernanda Celidonio	Brazil	2:19.77	Q
3	2	Nichelly Lysy	Brazil	2:20.44	Q
4	2	Nicole Frank	Uruguay	2:21.00	Q
5	2	Nicole Christensen	Venezuela	2:21.02	Q
6	1	Stefanía Gómez	Colombia	2:21.17	Q
7	3	Isabella Chavez	Mexico	2:22.08	Q
8	3	Madgalena Portela	Argentina	2:23.42	Q
9	3	Elizabeth Jiménez	Dominican Republic	2:23.53	q, NR
10	3	Laurent Estrada	Cuba	2:24.38	q
11	2	Alexandria Cotter	Puerto Rico	2:24.58	q
12	1	Avi Tromp	Aruba	2:26.76	q
13	1	Mónica Leydar	Venezuela	2:27.08	q
14	2	Micaela Mazzari	Costa Rica	2:27.78	q
15	1	María Santolaya	Mexico	2:28.94	q
16	1	Vanessa Alvarado	Puerto Rico	2:29.27	q
17	1	Zuri Ferguson	Trinidad and Tobago	2:31.03	
18	3	Fiorella Mateos	Paraguay	2:31.43	
19	2	Astrid Caballero	Paraguay	2:32.18	
=20	3	Andrea Gutiérrez	Nicaragua	2:32.99	
=20	2	Sara Dowden	Grenada	2:32.99	
22	2	Riley Watson	Cayman Islands	2:33.12	
23	1	Jaiya Simmons	Barbados	2:33.61	

Final A – August 14

Rank	Name	Nationality	Time	Notes
1st place, gold medalist(s)	Agostina Hein	Argentina	2:12.12	JPR, NR
2nd place, silver medalist(s)	Fernanda Celidonio	Brazil	2:16.49	
3rd place, bronze medalist(s)	Isabella Chávez	Mexico	2:18.53	
4	Nicole Frank	Uruguay	2:18.59	
5	Madgalena Portela	Argentina	2:18.68	
6	Nichelly Lysy	Brazil	2:19.54	
7	Nicole Christensen	Venezuela	2:21.65	
8	Stefanía Gómez	Colombia	2:22.12	

Final B – August 14

Rank	Name	Nationality	Time	Notes
9	Laurent Estrada	Cuba	2:22.55	
10	Mónica Leydar	Venezuela	2:22.87	
11	Elizabeth Jiménez	Dominican Republic	2:23.35	NR
12	Avi Tromp	Aruba	2:24.41	NR
13	Micaela Mazzari	Costa Rica	2:26.23	
14	Vanessa Alvarado	Puerto Rico	2:29.11	
15	María Santolaya	Mexico	2:30.27	
16	Alexandria Cotter	Puerto Rico	DSQ	

=== 400 metre individual medley ===
Heats – August 13

Rank	Heat	Name	Nationality	Time	Notes
1	3	Agostina Hein	Argentina	4:47.90	Q, JPR
2	2	Agatha Amaral	Brazil	4:56.44	Q
3	2	Madgalena Portela	Argentina	4:59.02	Q
4	2	Samantha Baños	Colombia	4:59.92	
5	3	Leticia Silva	Brazil	5:02.41	Q
6	2	María Santolaya	Mexico	5:02.59	Q
7	2	Alexandria Cotter	Puerto Rico	5:03.08	Q
8	2	Nicole Christensen	Venezuela	5:03.65	Q
9	3	Mónica Leydar	Venezuela	5:05.35	Q
10	3	Nicole Frank	Uruguay	5:06.84	
11	3	Isabella Chavez	Mexico	5:07.20	q
12	1	Sara Dowden	Grenada	5:24.17	q
13	3	Andrea Gutiérrez	Nicaragua	5:24.69	q
14	2	Madison Mac Millan	Antigua and Barbuda	5:24.39	q
15	3	Ornella Giuliano	Uruguay	5:28.26	q
16	1	Josefina Arrua	Paraguay	5:31.22	q
17	1	Miryan Rober	Paraguay	5:49.38	q
18	3	Melissa Diego	Guatemala	DNS	

Final A – August 13

Rank	Name	Nationality	Time	Notes
1st place, gold medalist(s)	Agostina Hein	Argentina	4:38.41	JPR
2nd place, silver medalist(s)	Madgalena Portela	Argentina	4:49.44	
3rd place, bronze medalist(s)	Agatha Amaral	Brazil	4:50.83	
4	Mónica Leydar	Venezuela	4:57.76	
5	Leticia Silva	Brazil	4:58.00	
6	Alexandria Cotter	Puerto Rico	5:01.64	
7	María Santolaya	Mexico	5:01.77	
8	Nicole Christensen	Venezuela	5:02.18	

Final B – August 13

Rank	Name	Nationality	Time	Notes
9	Isabella Chavez	Mexico	5:00.46	
10	Andrea Gutiérrez	Nicaragua	5:17.96	
11	Madison Mac Millan	Antigua and Barbuda	5:20.22	NR
12	Sara Dowden	Grenada	5:20.49	NR
13	Ornella Giuliano	Uruguay	5:26.85	
14	Josefina Arrua	Paraguay	5:27.99	
15	Miryan Rober	Paraguay	5:49.43	

=== 4 × 100 metre freestyle relay ===
Heats – August 10

Rank	Heat	Swimmers	Time	Notes
1	1	Mexico; María Fernanda Méndez (57.52); Fernanda Elizondo (58.72); Valeria Villarreal (57.90); Celia Pulido (56.18)	3:50.32	Q
2	1	Colombia; Isabella Budnik (21.27); María Santana (56.54); Stefanía Gómez (1:24.18); Tiffany Murillo (1:54.32); Isabella Bedoya (2:21.88)	3:51.15	Q
3	2	Brazil; Ana Julia Amaral (57.07); Joice Otero (1:55.37); Carolina Daher (2:52.53)	3:52.08	Q
4	2	Venezuela; Nicole Christensen (28.17); Fiorella Grossale (58.40); Daniela Pacheco (1:26.50); Fabiana Pesce (1:57.90); María Yegres (2:25.26)	3:55.30	Q
5	1	Argentina; Cecilia Dieleke (29.26); Magdalena Portela (1:00.79); Martina Urgelles (1:29.36); Catalina Acacio (1:59.12); Lucía Gauna (2:26.54); Agostina Hein (2:57.48); Malena Santillán (3:25.51)	3:55.77	Q
6	1	Guatemala; Belén Morales (58.13); Stephanie Iannaccone (59.05); Melissa Diego (1:00.04); Lucero Mejía (1:00.14)	3:57.36	Q, NR
7	2	Puerto Rico; Alanis Santiago (59.16); Lucianna Gutiérrez (59.88); Alexandria Cotter (58.45); Layra Pagan (1:00.16)	3:57.65	Q
8	2	Paraguay; Fiorella Mateos (1:01.76); Constanza Areco (59.31); Astrid Caballero (1:01.22); Lara Gimenez (59.70)	4:01.99	Q
9	2	Ecuador; Elvira Espinosa (58.24); Emma Sabando (1:01.43); Eva Andrade (1:01.31); María Daniela Contreras (1:02.60)	4:03.88	
10	1	Costa Rica; Micaela Mazzari (28.74); Nicole Centeno (59.91); Yuliana Ortiz (1:30.85); Jimena Rodríguez (2:02.98); Karina Solera (2:34.05)	4:06.57	

Final – August 10

Rank	Name	Time	Notes
1st place, gold medalist(s)	Brazil; Fernanda Celidonio (56.45); Beatriz Bezerra (56.18); Julia Ariosa (56.93); Stephanie Balduccini (54.47)	3:44.03	JPR
2nd place, silver medalist(s)	Mexico; María Fernanda Méndez (57.31); Valeria Villarreal (57.74); Fernanda Elizondo (57.18); Celia Pulido (55.54)	3:47.77	
3rd place, bronze medalist(s)	Argentina; Agostina Hein (56.30); Magdalena Portela (57.87); Malena Santillán (58.06); Lucía Gauna (56.53)	3:48.76	
4	Colombia; Isabella Bedoya (56.37); María Santana (57.99); Tiffany Murillo (56.90); Stefanía Gómez (57.78)	3:49.04	
5	Venezuela; Fiorella Grossale (58.47); Daniela Pacheco (59.12); Fabiana Pesce (58.63); María Yegres (56.73)	3:52.95	
6	Puerto Rico; Alanis Santiago (59.09); Lucianna Gutiérrez (59.23); Andrea Perea (59.88); Layra Pagan (59.38)	3:57.57	
7	Guatemala; Belén Morales (58.15); Stephanie Iannaccone (58.94); Melissa Diego (1:00.13); Lucero Mejía (1:00.47)	3:57.69	
8	Paraguay; Constanza Areco (59.88); Fiorella Mateos (59.70); Lara Gimenez (1:00.70); Astrid Caballero (1:01.34)	4:01.62	

=== 4 × 200 metre freestyle relay ===
Heats – August 13

Rank	Name	Time	Notes
1	Brazil; Mariana de Oliveira (2:06.14); Joice Otero (2:05.75); Leticia Silva (2:06.84); Leticia Romão (2:04.98)	8:23.71	Q
2	Venezuela; María Yegres (2:02.99); Mariana Cote (2:07.77); Paola Azzato (2:05.61); Fiorella Grossale (2:08.19)	8:24.56	Q
3	Colombia; Isabella Budnik (2:05.38); María Santana (2:10.95); Stefanía Gómez (2:06.81); Tiffany Murillo (2:07.22)	8:30.36	Q
4	Argentina; Martina Urgelles (2:09.28); Lucía Gauna (2:08.55); Malena Santillán (2:05.63); Cecilia Dieleke (2:10.55)	8:33.71	Q
5	Mexico; Valeria Villarreal (2:10.45); Yuritzi Salgado (2:07.43); Andrea González (2:07.43); María Santolaya (2:08.68)	8:33.99	Q
6	Costa Rica; Nicole Centeno (2:10.84); Yuliana Ortiz (2:11.91); Micaela Mazzari (2:10.21); Jimena Rodríguez (2:09.15)	8:42.11	Q
7	Puerto Rico; Alanis Santiago (2:07.53); Andrea Perea (2:10.71); Alexandria Cotter (2:15.61); Lucianna Gutiérrez (2:09.11)	8:42.96	Q
8	Cayman Islands; Harper Barrowman (2:10.23); Kyra Rabess (2:05.86); Riley Watson (2:18.10); Lila Higgo (2:11.72)	8:45.91	Q
9	Paraguay; Luciana Codas (2:11.43); Lara Giménez (2:16.05); Constanza Areco (2:15.93); Cecilia Piraino (2:17.49)	9:00.90	NR
	Ecuador; Elvira Espinosa; Emma Sabando; Eva Andrade; María Daniela Contreras	DNS	

Final – August 13

Rank	Name	Time	Notes
1st place, gold medalist(s)	Brazil; Julia Ariosa (2:04.33); Fernanda Celidonio (2:02.00); Carolina Daher (2:02.05); Stephanie Balduccini (2:00.11)	8:08.49	JPR
2nd place, silver medalist(s)	Argentina; Agostina Hein (1:59.45 NR); Lucía Gauna (2:04.53); Magdalena Portela (2:04.64); Malena Santillán (2:02.22)	8:10.84	
3rd place, bronze medalist(s)	Colombia; María Santana (2:05.24); Samantha Baños (2:02.88); Isabella Budnik (2:04.85); Tiffany Murillo (2:01.69)	8:14.66	NR
4	Mexico; Andrea González (2:07.59); Sharon Guerrero (2:06.52); Fernanda Elizondo (2:04.44); Celia Pulido (2:04.49)	8:23.04	
5	Venezuela; María Yegres (2:00.82); Nicole Christensen (2:08.19); Mónica Leydar (2:09.12); Paola Azzato (2:05.89)	8:24.02	
6	Cayman Islands; Harper Barrowman (2:09.99); Kyra Rabess (2:04.96); Riley Watson (2:15.94); Lila Higgo (2:08.19)	8:39.08	NR
7	Puerto Rico; Alanis Santiago (2:07.00); Andrea Perea (2:09.06); Layra Pagan (2:14.11); Lucianna Gutiérrez (2:09.52)	8:39.69	
8	Costa Rica; Nicole Centeno (2:11.46); Yuliana Ortiz (2:13.43); Micaela Mazzari (2:09.38); Jimena Rodríguez (2:09.69)	8:43.96	

=== 4 × 100 metre medley relay ===
Final – August 14

Rank	Name	Time	Notes
1st place, gold medalist(s)	Brazil; Julia Ferreira (1:02.30); Nichelly Lysy (1:09.29); Joice Otero (59.51); Stephanie Balduccini (54.82)	4:05.92	JPR
2nd place, silver medalist(s)	Argentina; Cecilia Dieleke (1:03.00); Catalina Acacio (1:12.22); Agostina Hein (1:00.48); Lucía Gauna (56.74)	4:12.44	
3rd place, bronze medalist(s)	Mexico; Celia Pulido (1:01.74); Mariana Ortega (1:13.00); María Mendez (59.83); Fernanda Elizondo (57.91)	4:12.48	
4	Colombia; Isabella Budnik (1:04.76); Stefanía Gómez (1:11.73); Samantha Baños (1:01.09); Isabella Bedoya (56.22)	4:13.80	
5	Venezuela; Nicole Christensen (1:08.15); Marielys Martínez (1:12.32); Mónica Leydar (1:04.39); María Yegres (56.68)	4:21.54	
6	Uruguay; Daryll Pereira (1:06.40); Nicole Frank (1:12.94); Luna Chabat (1:05.56); Angelina Solari (57.99)	4:22.89	
7	Puerto Rico; Lucianna Gutiérrez (1:06.65); Andrea Perea (1:15.16); Alexandria Cotter (1:05.26); Alanis Santiago (59.14)	4:26.21	
8	Paraguay; Lara Giménez (1:07.49); Heather Allison (1:19.48); Amara Vergara (1:09.39); Constanza Areco (1:01.31)	4:37.67	

== Mixed results ==
=== 4 × 100 metre freestyle relay ===
Heats – August 11

Rank	Name	Time	Notes
1	Brazil; Gabriel Moura (51.42); Gustavo Saldo (50.84); Carolina Daher (57.38); Julia Ariosa (56.87)	3:36.51	Q
2	Argentina; Matías Chaillou (50.79); Ulises Saravia (51.15); Magdalena Portela (58.81); Agostina Hein (57.04)	3:37.79	Q
3	Bahamas; Marvin Johnson (51.36); Lamar Taylor (49.15); Zoe Williamson (59.34); Elyse Wood (58.57)	3:38.42	
4	Colombia; Frank Solano (51.79); Juan José Giraldo (53.29); Samantha Baños (57.36); Isabella Bedoya (56.10)	3:38.54	Q
5	Mexico; Diego Camacho (51.43); Alfredo Velasquez (50.95); Andrea González (58.37); Valeria Villarreal (58.42)	3:39.66	Q
6	Puerto Rico; Caleb Romero (52.20); Andrés Brooks (50.62); Alanis Santiago (59.33); Lucianna Gutiérrez (59.75)	3:40.45	Q
7	Venezuela; Dennis Pérez (51.03); Emil Pérez (50.62); Fabiana Pesce (59.33); Fiorella Grossale (59.75)	3:40.73	Q
8	Jamaica; Nathaniel Thomas (51.55); Collin McKenzie (51.04); Christanya Shirley (59.59); Sabrina Lyn (59.53)	3:41.51	Q
9	Aruba; Inald Fernandes (52.34); Braynsly Dirksz (53.04); Avi Tromp (59.28); Chloe Farro (58.14)	3:42.80	
10	Dominican Republic; Javier Núñez (51.79); Anthony Piñeiro (52.82); Elizabeth Jiménez (59.02); Darielys Ortiz (59.57)	3:43.20	
11	Panama; Andrey Villarreal (52.09); Julio Rodríguez (51.97); María Castillo (59.71); Emily Santos (59.99)	3:43.76	
12	Guatemala; Roberto Gossmann (53.50); Belén Morales (59.25); Stephanie Iannaccone (59.31); Roberto Bonilla (53.13)	3:45.19	NR
13	Paraguay; Camilo Villalba (52.97); Bruno Heinichen (53.62); Constanza Areco (59.70); Fiorella Mateos (59.79)	3:46.08	
14	Trinidad and Tobago; Zachary Anthony (52.24); Amari Ash (1:03.14); Zuri Ferguson (1:01.11); Zarek Wilson (51.49)	3:47.98	NR
15	Barbados; Victor Ashby (55.93); Jaiya Simmons (58.99); Heidi Stoute (58.89); Josh Ross (54.35)	3:48.16	
16	Guyana; Paul Mahaica (54.73); Shareefah Lewis (1:03.95); Ariel Rodrigues (1:02.08); Noel Raekwon (49.83)	3:50.59	
17	Antigua and Barbuda; Ethan Stubbs-Green (53.19); Tivon Benjamin (55.43); Madison Mac Millan (1:01.88); Aunjelique Liddie (1:00.36)	3:50.86	
18	Ecuador; Juan Diego León (55.79); Eva Andrade (56.11); Elvira Espinosa (1:07.24); Luis Jimenez (56.15)	3:55.29	
	Bolivia; Lorie Rojas; Adriana Giles; Esteban Nuñez; Yatsen Soza	DNS	

Final – August 11

Rank	Name	Time	Notes
1st place, gold medalist(s)	Brazil; Guilherme Caribé (48.50); Pedro Sansone (49.46); Beatriz Bezerra (55.96); Stephanie Balduccini (54.93)	3:28.85	JPR
2nd place, silver medalist(s)	Argentina; Matías Santiso (49.76); Matías Chaillou (49.83); Agostina Hein (55.60); Lucía Gauna (56.14)	3:31.33	NR
3rd place, bronze medalist(s)	Mexico; Diego Camacho (51.28); Andrés Dupont (48.19); María Mendez (57.39); Celia Pulido (55.63)	3:32.49	
4	Colombia; Frank Solano (50.25); Santiago Arteaga (49.71); Tiffany Murillo (56.88); Isabella Bedoya (55.90)	3:32.74	NR
5	Venezuela; Emil Pérez (50.63); Jorge Otaiza (50.29); Fiorella Grossale (58.56); María Yegres (56.53)	3:36.01	
6	Bahamas; Marvin Johnson (50.72); Lamar Taylor (48.86); Zoe Williamson (58.41); Elyse Wood (59.24)	3:37.23	NR
7	Jamaica; Nathaniel Thomas (51.33); Collin McKenzie (50.78); Christanya Shirley (59.14); Sabrina Lyn (58.06)	3:39.31	NR
8	Puerto Rico; Caleb Romero (52.15); Andrés Brooks (50.80); Alanis Santiago (58.70); Lucianna Gutiérrez (57.84)	3:39.49	

=== 4 × 100 metre medley relay ===
Heats – August 12

Rank	Name	Time	Notes
1	Argentina; Cecilia Dieleke (1:03.73); Dante Nicola (1:02.55); Ulises Cazau (52.31); Magdalena Portela (57.88)	3:36.47	Q
2	Mexico; Diego Camacho (57.04); Marco Pat (1:03.55); María Mendez (1:00.93); Fernanda Elizondo (58.08)	3:59.60	Q
3	Brazil; Sophia Penteriche (1:06.08); Fernanda Celidonio (1:10.43); Gustavo Saldo (53.64); Davi Zanella (50.48)	4:00.63	Q
4	Colombia; Gabriel Arias (57.49); Juan José Giraldo (1:03.86); Samantha Baños (1:01.57); María Santana (58.72)	4:01.64	Q
5	Venezuela; Mónica Leydar (1:06.30); Javier Colmenares (1:04.06); Jorge Otaiza (54.21); Fiorella Grossale (58.77)	4:03.34	Q
6	Jamaica; Nathaniel Thomas (58.67); Kito Campbell (1:03.46); Sabrina Lyn (1:02.59); Christanya Shirley (58.67)	4:03.39	Q
7	Puerto Rico; Xavier Ruiz (57.40); Diego Resto (1:03.09); Alexandria Cotter (1:04.87); Alanis Santiago (58.99)	4:04.35	Q
8	Guatemala; Lucero Mejía (1:05.14); Roberto Bonilla (1:03.78); Stephanie Iannaccone (1:03.00); Roberto Gossmann (53.03)	4:04.95	Q
9	Ecuador; María Contreras (1:06.03); Juan Diego León (1:03.96); Emma Sabando (1:02.49); Luis Jimenez (54.05)	4:06.53	
10	Aruba; Ocean van Loon (59.00); Braynsly Dirksz (1:05.17); Avi Tromp (1:05.09); Chloe Farro (57.77)	4:07.03	
11	Dominican Republic; Elizabeth Jiménez (1:04.99); Pablo Solano (1:04.40); Darielys Ortiz (1:05.64); Cristián Ramos (52.56)	4:07.59	
12	Bahamas; Nigel Forbes (1:00.30); Emmanuel Gadson (1:04.01); Elyse Wood (1:04.6); Zoe Williamson (59.94)	4:08.51	
13	Paraguay; Lara Giménez (1:08.11); Maximiliano Benítez (1:06.38); Ernesto González (56.74); Constanza Areco (58.97)	4:11.20	
14	Trinidad and Tobago; Johann-Mathew Matamoro (59.27); Tyla Ho-a-shu (1:17.42); Zachary Anthony (56.86); Amari Ash (1:03.18)	4:16.73	NR
	Bolivia; Lorie Rojas; Adriana Giles; Esteban Nuñez; Yatsen Soza	DNS	
	Panama; Emily Santos; Julio Rodríguez; María Castillo; Andrey Villarreal	DNS	

Final – August 12

Rank	Name	Time	Notes
1st place, gold medalist(s)	Brazil; Julia Ferreira (1:03.96); Guilherme Camossato (1:01.07); Lúcio Filho (52.37); Stephanie Balduccini (54.15)	3:51.55	JPR
2nd place, silver medalist(s)	Argentina; Ulises Saravia (54.18); Dante Nicola (1:02.90); Agostina Hein (58.57); Lucía Gauna (56.37)	3:52.02	
3rd place, bronze medalist(s)	Colombia; Gabriel Arias (57.00); Juan José Giraldo (1:02.43); Samantha Baños (1:01.32); María Santana (57.26)	3:58.01	
4	Venezuela; Mónica Leydar (1:06.57); Javier Colmenares (1:03.13); Jorge Otaiza (52.99); Fiorella Grossale (57.48)	4:00.17	
5	Guatemala; Lucero Mejía (1:05.07); Roberto Bonilla (1:02.35); Stephanie Iannaccone (1:02.77); Roberto Gossmann (52.37)	4:02.56	NR
6	Puerto Rico; Xavier Ruiz (59.36); Diego Resto (1:02.04); Alexandria Cotter (1:04.85); Alanis Santiago (58.39)	4:04.64	
7	Jamaica; Nathaniel Thomas (58.39); Kito Campbell (1:06.55); Sabrina Lyn (1:02.16); Christanya Shirley (59.13)	4:06.23	
	Mexico; Diego Camacho; Marco Pat; María Mendez; Fernanda Elizondo	DNQ	

== Open water swimming results ==
=== Men's 10 km ===
Final – August 17

Rank	Name	Nationality	Time	Notes
1st place, gold medalist(s)	Paulo Strehlke	Mexico	1:50:01	
2nd place, silver medalist(s)	Matheus Melecchi	Brazil	1:50.05	
3rd place, bronze medalist(s)	Leonardo Macedo	Brazil	1:53:03	
4	Freddy Arévalo	Colombia	1:54:22	
5	Jeison Rojas	Costa Rica	1:54:32	
6	Juan Aguirre	Ecuador	1:54:58	
7	Adrián Ywanaga	Peru	1:56:25	
8	Juan Alcívar	Ecuador	1:57:50	
9	Alan Gonzalez	Mexico	1:58:37	
10	Iván Mallea	Chile	2:00:25	
11	Franco Ayllon	Peru	2:02:09	
12	Juan Núñez	Dominican Republic	2:02:40	
13	Jarod Bruno	Puerto Rico	2:04:50	
14	Joaquín Estigarribia	Paraguay	2:06:30	
15	Kenneth Mirabal	Puerto Rico	2:15:57	
16	Alejandro Plaza	Bolivia	2:17:27	
	Tomás Rodríguez	Argentina	DNF	
	Sergio Ybarra	Venezuela	DNF	

=== Women's 10 km ===
Final – August 17

Rank	Name	Nationality	Time	Notes
1st place, gold medalist(s)	Cibelle Jungblut	Brazil	2:01:14	
2nd place, silver medalist(s)	Ana Abad	Ecuador	2:01:17	
3rd place, bronze medalist(s)	Paulina Alanis	Mexico	2:01:32	
4	Lizian Simões	Brazil	2:01:33	
5	Sharon Guerrero	Mexico	2:01:41	
6	Martina Contreras	Argentina	2:01:54	
7	Pilar Cañedo	Uruguay	2:03:12	
8	Britta Schwengle	Aruba	2:06:09	
9	Candela Giordanino	Argentina	2:07:01	
10	Andrea Bordones	Venezuela	2:08:44	
11	Yanci Vanegas	Guatemala	2:09:55	
12	María Poerres	Guatemala	2:11:02	
13	Cielo Peralda	Paraguay	2:11:50	
14	Mariela Guadamuro	Puerto Rico	2:11:51	
15	Emma Guglielmello	Puerto Rico	2:12:54	
16	Nathalie Medina	Venezuela	2:13:22	
17	Mia Arévalo	Peru	2:14:03	
18	Stephanie Melendez	El Salvador	2:16:30	
19	Christina Durán	Dominican Republic	2:18:06	
20	Isabella Hernández	Dominican Republic	2:22:45	
	Danna Martínez	Ecuador	DNF	
