= Sailing at the 2025 Junior Pan American Games =

Sailing at the 2025 Junior American Games
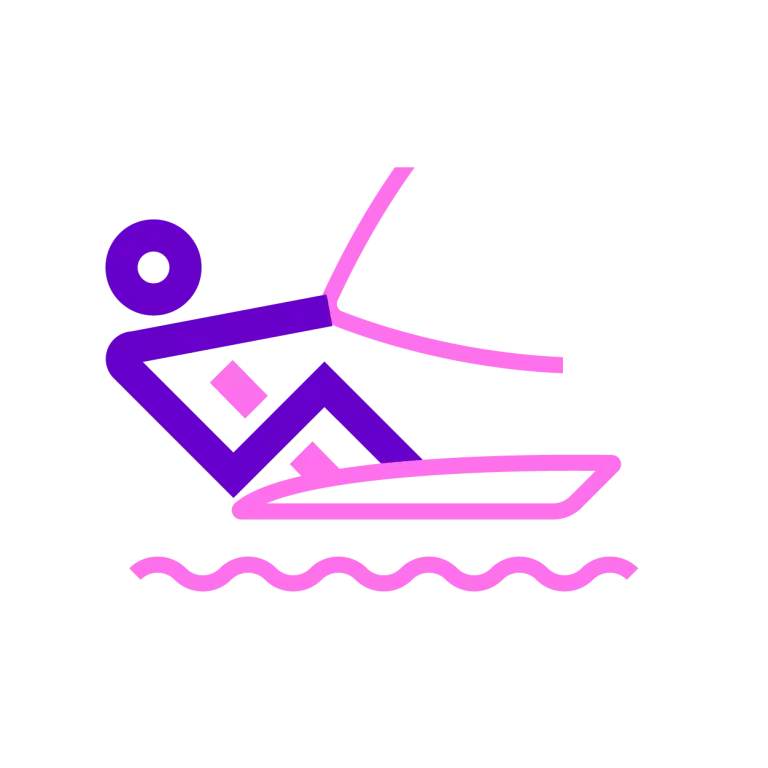
- Venue: San José Beach
- Start date: August 15, 2025
- End date: August 17, 2025
- No. of events: 5 (3 men, 2 women)
- Competitors: 58 from 26 nations

The sailing competitions at the 2025 Junior Pan American Games were held at the San José Beach, located in Encarnación, Paraguay.

The winner of each event qualified for 2027 Pan American Games in Lima, Peru.

== Qualification ==
A total of 64 quota spots were available. Qualification for the games was based on various events and universality quotas. The latest qualification summary mentioned the sixth schedule event, the women's kite, was dropped due to low entries, with the quotas for this event distributed among the other events. Only 58 of the 64 quota spots were allocated.

=== Summary ===
Nation	Men			Women		Total	
Nation	IQFoil	Dinghy	Kites	IQFoil	Dinghy	Boats	Athletes
Antigua and Barbuda		X				1	1
Argentina	X	X	X	X	X	5	5
Aruba	X			X		2	2
Bahamas		X			X	2	2
Barbados		X				1	1
Bermuda		X			X	2	2
Brazil		X	X	X	X	4	4
Canada		X	X		X	3	3
Cayman Islands		X			X	2	2
Chile		X			X	2	2
Cuba	X		X	X	X	4	4
Ecuador		X			X	2	2
El Salvador		X				1	1
Grenada		X			X	2	2
Guatemala		X			X	2	2
Jamaica		X				1	1
Mexico	X		X		X	3	3
Paraguay		X			X	2	2
Peru	X			X	X	3	3
Puerto Rico				X	X	2	2
Saint Vincent and the Grenadines					X	1	1
Trinidad and Tobago		X			X	2	2
United States	X	X		X	X	4	4
Uruguay		X			X	2	2
Venezuela	X			X		2	2
Virgin Islands		X				1	1
Total: 26 NOCs	7	19	5	8	19	58	58

== Medal summary ==
=== Medal table ===
* Host nation (Paraguay)

Rank	Nation	Gold	Silver	Bronze	Total
1	United States	2	0	1	3
2	Aruba	1	1	0	2
3	Brazil	1	0	1	2
4	Bahamas	1	0	0	1
5	Argentina	0	1	0	1
5	Bermuda	0	1	0	1
5	Guatemala	0	1	0	1
5	Mexico	0	1	0	1
9	Peru	0	0	2	2
10	Canada	0	0	1	1
Totals (10 entries)		5	5	5	15

=== Medalists ===
==== Men ====
Event	Gold	Silver	Bronze
IQFoil	Makani Andrews; United States	Kaj Rozeboom; Aruba	Bartolomé de las Casas; Peru
ILCA 7	Charles Barclay; United States	Sebastian Kempe; Bermuda	Gustavo Kiessling; Brazil
Kite	Lucas Fonseca; Brazil	Alec Guerrero; Mexico	James Huynh; Canada

==== Women ====
Event	Gold	Silver	Bronze
IQFoil	Zara Rozeboom; Aruba	Chiara Ferretti; Argentina	Danicka Sailer; United States
ILCA 6	Eliza Denning; Bahamas	Cristina Castellanos; Guatemala	Florencia Chiarella; Peru

== Results ==
=== Men's iQFoil ===
Race 1–2 – August 15 / Race 3–5 – August 17

Rank	Athlete	Nation	Race					Total Points	Net Points
Rank	Athlete	Nation	1	2	3	4	5	Total Points	Net Points
1st place, gold medalist(s)	Makani Andrews	United States	(2)	1	2	1	1	7	5
2nd place, silver medalist(s)	Kaj Rozeboom	Aruba	1	2	1	(4)	4 STP	12	8
3rd place, bronze medalist(s)	Bartolomé de las Casas	Peru	3	(4)	3	2	2	14	10
4	Joaquín Reutemann	Argentina	(5)	3	4	3	4	19	14
5	Jerónimo Abogado	Mexico	4	(6); STP	5	5	6	26	20
6	Miguel Abag	Cuba	6	6	6	(8); BFD	5	31	23
7	Felix Estredo	Venezuela	(8); DNC	8 STP	8 DNC	6	7	37	29

=== ILCA 7 ===
Race 1–2 – August 15 / Race 3–5 – August 17

Rank	Athlete	Nation	Race					Total Points	Net Points
Rank	Athlete	Nation	1	2	3	4	5	Total Points	Net Points
1st place, gold medalist(s)	Charles Barclay	United States	2	1	1	(6)	1	11	5
2nd place, silver medalist(s)	Sebastian Kempe	Bermuda	5	2	(11)	1	3	22	11
3rd place, bronze medalist(s)	Gustavo Kiessling	Brazil	4	(11)	2	2	7	26	15
4	O'zani Lafond	Antigua and Barbuda	(8)	3	3	4	5	23	15
5	Johnathon Schwartz	Jamaica	6	4	(9)	3	4	26	17
6	Sergio Gutarra	Peru	7	7	4	9	(11)	38	27
7	Jenderson Canizales	Guatemala	9	6	6	7	(20); RET	48	28
8	Reilly Nakatsu	Canada	(13)	8	5	8	8	42	29
9	Stefano Caiafa	Uruguay	16	(17)	13	5	2	53	36
10	Francisco Gómez	Argentina	12	5	(14)	10	9	50	36
11	Stefan Stüven	Trinidad and Tobago	11	9	8 STP	11	(12)	51	39
12	Ricardo Seguel	Chile	1	12	(15)	14	13	55	40
13	Joshua Higgins	Bahamas	3	(15)	12	15	10	55	40
14	Jaspar Nielsen	Cayman Islands	15	(19)	8	12	6	60	41
15	Tadas Koreiva	Ecuador	10	(17); STP	10	13	16	66	49
16	José Luis Mena	El Salvador	(19)	10	16	17	14	76	57
17	Joseph Whelan	Barbados	14	13	(18)	16	15	76	58
18	Kishon Bruno	Grenada	18	14	(19)	19	17	87	68
19	Nicolás López	Paraguay	17	(19); STP	17	18	19; STP	90	71

=== Men's Formula kite ===
Race 1–4 – August 17

Rank	Athlete	Nation	Race				Total Points	Net Points
Rank	Athlete	Nation	1	2	3	4	Total Points	Net Points
1st place, gold medalist(s)	Lucas Fonseca	Brazil	(1)	1	1	1	4	3
2nd place, silver medalist(s)	Alec Vazquez	Mexico	2	(4)	3	2	11	7
3rd place, bronze medalist(s)	James Huynh	Canada	(3)	2	2	3	10	7
4	Adriano Castro	Cuba	(4)	3	4	4	15	11
5	Mateo Maldonado	Argentina	(6); DNS	6 DNS	6 DNS	6 DNS	24	18

=== Women's iQFoil ===
Race 1–2 – August 15 / Race 3–5 – August 18

Rank	Athlete	Nation	Race					Total Points	Net Points
Rank	Athlete	Nation	1	2	3	4	5	Total Points	Net Points
1st place, gold medalist(s)	Zara Rozeboom	Aruba	1	(2); STP	2	2	2	9	7
2nd place, silver medalist(s)	Chiara Ferreti	Argentina	(3)	2	1	1	3	11	8
3rd place, bronze medalist(s)	Danicka Sailer	United States	2	(4)	3	3	1	13	9
4	Sofia Rocha	Brazil	(6); STP	2	4	4	4	20	14
5	Sofía Rubini	Peru	4	(8); BFD	5	5	5	27	19
6	Breykari Parada	Venezuela	(8); DNS	8 DNE	6	6	8 DNF	36	28
7	Elizabeth Buchillon	Cuba	(8); DNC	8 DNS	8 DNS	7	8 DNF	39	31

=== ILCA 6 ===
Rank	Athlete	Nation	Race					Total Points	Net Points
Rank	Athlete	Nation	1	2	3	4	5	Total Points	Net Points
1st place, gold medalist(s)	Eliza Denning	Bahamas	3	(20); DSQ	1	6	1	31	11
2nd place, silver medalist(s)	Cristina Castellanos	Guatemala	6	(8)	3	1	2	20	12
3rd place, bronze medalist(s)	Florencia Chiarella	Peru	(8)	3	2	2	5	20	12
4	Ana Carolina Tonniges	Brazil	2	2	(6)	5	4	19	13
5	Isabella Mendoza	United States	4	1	5	4	(6)	20	14
6	Annalise Balasubramanian	Canada	1	5	(7)	3	7	23	16
7	Delfina Kuttel	Argentina	(7)	4	4	7	3	25	18
8	Marina Escudero	Puerto Rico	6 STP	7	13	(15)	11	52	37
9	Nicole Stovell	Bermuda	9	(10)	10	9	9 STP	47	37
10	Moira Padilla	Ecuador	(12)	9	12	8	9	50	38
11	Camila Ernst	Chile	10	(14)	8	11	12	55	41
12	Rhuby Mendoza	Paraguay	13	7 STP	(16)	12	10	58	42
13	Charlotte Webster	Cayman Islands	11	11	9	13	(14)	58	44
14	María Emilia Delgado	Uruguay	(15)	13	14	10	13	65	50
15	Scarlett Hadley	Saint Vincent and the Grenadines	14	12	11	14	(15)	66	51
16	Angélica Fabián	Cuba	17	15	15	16	(18)	81	63
17	Sofía del Paso	Mexico	16	17	17	(18)	17; STP	85	67
18	Kyla-Marie Morris	Trinidad and Tobago	(18)	16	18	17	17	86	68
19	Azalia Renaud	Grenada	19	(20); DNF	19	19	20; DNF	97	77
