= Eduardo Cisternas =

Chilean swimmer (born 2004)

Personal information
- Full name: Eduardo Alberto Cisternas Gómez
- Nationality: Chile
- Born: 10 January 2004 (age 22) Santiago, Chile
- Height: 1.81 m (5 ft 11 in)
- Weight: 72 kg (159 lb)

Sport
- Sport: Swimming
- Event: 200, 400, 800, 1500 freestyle
- College team: Pennsylvania State University
- Club: Stade Francais
Medal record
Men's swimming
Representing Chile
South American Championships
Bronze medal – third place	2021 Buenos Aires	4×200 m freestyle
Bolivarian Games
Gold medal – first place	2025 Lima-Ayacucho	200 m freestyle
Gold medal – first place	2025 Lima-Ayacucho	400 m freestyle
Gold medal – first place	2025 Lima-Ayacucho	4×200 m freestyle
Silver medal – second place	2025 Lima-Ayacucho	4×100 m freestyle
Junior Pan American Games
Silver medal – second place	2025 Asunción	200 m freestyle
Silver medal – second place	2025 Asunción	400 m freestyle
Bronze medal – third place	2021 Cali-Valle	4×200 m freestyle
Bronze medal – third place	2025 Asunción	4×200 m freestyle
South American Youth Games
Gold medal – first place	2022 Rosario	200 m freestyle
Silver medal – second place	2022 Rosario	400 m freestyle
Silver medal – second place	2022 Rosario	1500 m freestyle
Silver medal – second place	2022 Rosario	4×100 m freestyle
Silver medal – second place	2022 Rosario	4×100 m medley

Eduardo Alberto Cisternas Gómez (born January 10, 2004, in Santiago, Chile) is a Chilean competitive swimmer who specializes in freestyle events. He is a two-time Olympian and a Chilean national record holder in multiple freestyle events.

== Career ==
Cisternas competed in the men's 400 metre freestyle at the 2020 Summer Olympics in Tokyo. He set a new Chilean national record in the event during the preliminary heats, improving upon his previous mark.

At the 2023 Pan American Games in Santiago, Cisternas reached the final of the men's 400 metre freestyle and finished seventh.

He competed in the men's 400 metre freestyle at the 2024 Summer Olympics in Paris. In the event, he posted a time of 3:51.29, setting a new Chilean national record in the discipline.

In 2025, Cisternas competed at the Junior Pan American Games in Asunción, where he won silver medals in the men's 200 metre freestyle with a time of 1:47.99 and the men's 400 metre freestyle with a time of 3:49.40.

== Academic background ==
Cisternas is a student-athlete at Pennsylvania State University, where he competes in the university's NCAA Division I swimming program.

== See also ==
- List of Pennsylvania State University Olympians
- Swimming at the Pan American Games
- Chile at the Olympics
