= Antigua and Barbuda at the 2025 Junior Pan American Games =

- IOC code: ANT
- NOC: Antigua and Barbuda National Olympic Committee
- Website: www.antiguaolympiccommittee.com

in Asunción, Paraguay 9 August 2025 – 23 August 2025
- Competitors: 10 in 5 sports
- Medals: Gold 0 Silver 0 Bronze 0 Total 0

Junior Pan American Games appearances (overview)
- 2021; 2025

Antigua and Barbuda competed at the 2025 Junior Pan American Games in Asunción, Paraguay from 9 to 23 August 2025.
The Antigua and Barbuda team consisted of 10 athletes, however, the country failed to win a medal.

== Competitors ==
The following is the list of number of competitors whom participated at the Games per sport/discipline.

Sport	Men	Women	Total
Athletics	0	3	3
Fencing	0	1	1
Sailing	1	0	1
Swimming	2	2	4
Table tennis	0	1	1
Total	3	7	10

== Athletics ==
Antigua and Barbuda qualified three athletes.

Women

- La'Nica Locker
- Ajani Daley
- Geolyna Dowdye

== Fencing ==
Antigua and Barbuda qualified one athlete.

Women

- Jewel Crump

== Sailing ==
Antigua and Barbuda qualified one male sailor for the dinghy event.

Men

Athlete	Event	Race					Total Points	Net Points	Rank
Athlete	Event	1	2	3	4	5	Total Points	Net Points	Rank
O'Zari Lafond	ILCA 7	(8)	3	3	4	5	23	15	4th

== Swimming ==
Antigua and Barbuda qualified a team of four swimmers (two men and two women).

Men

- Ethan Stubbs-Greene
- Tivon Benjamin

Women

- Aunhelique Liddie
- Madison McMillian

== Table tennis ==
Antigua and Barbuda qualified one athlete.

Women

Athlete	Event	Round of 32	Round of 16	Quarterfinal	Semifinal	Final / BM	
Athlete	Event	Opposition Result	Opposition Result	Opposition Result	Opposition Result	Opposition Result	Rank
Stuti Kashyap	Singles						
