= Emily Santos =

Panamanian swimmer (born 2005)

Emily Santos OLY
Personal information
- Full name: Emily Marie Santos Silva
- Nationality: Panamanian
- Born: 15 July 2005 (age 20)

Sport
- Sport: Swimming
Medal record
Women's swimming
Representing Panama
Central American and Caribbean Games
Silver medal – second place	2023 San Salvador	200 m breaststroke
Junior Pan American Games
Gold medal – first place	2025 Asunción	100 m breaststroke
Silver medal – second place	2025 Asunción	200 m breaststroke

Emily Santos OLY (born 15 July 2005) is a Panamanian swimmer. She competed in the women's 100 metre breaststroke at the 2020 Summer Olympics.
