= Swimming at the 2026 Summer Youth Olympics – Women's 400 metre freestyle =

Women's 400 metre freestyle at the 2026 Summer Youth Olympics
- Venue: Complexe Tour de l'Oeuf
- Dates: 1 November
- Competitors: 21 from 21 nations
- Winning time: 4:22.87

Medalists
| gold medal | Elvira Espinosa | Ecuador |
| silver medal | Leah Markgraaff | South Africa |
| bronze medal | Celya Paques | Belgium |

The women's 400 metre freestyle event at the 2026 Summer Youth Olympics took place on 1 November at the Complexe Tour de l'Oeuf in Dakar, Senegal.

== Results ==
The event began at 10:15.

| Rank | Lane | Name | Nationality | Time | Notes |
|---|---|---|---|---|---|
| 1st place, gold medalist(s) | 6 | Elvira Espinosa | Ecuador | 4:22.87 | |
| 2nd place, silver medalist(s) | 2 | Leah Markgraaff | South Africa | 4:26.13 | |
| 3rd place, bronze medalist(s) | 7 | Celya Paques | Belgium | 4:28.37 | |
| 4 | 4 | Simona Ivanova | Bulgaria | 4:28.43 | |
| 5 | 4 | Ilef Zouaghi | Tunisia | 4:29.42 | |
| 6 | 6 | Aiymkyz Aidaralieva | Kyrgyzstan | 4:32.53 | |
| 7 | 5 | Wui Kiu Man | Hong Kong | 4:32.59 | |
| 8 | 5 | Madison Sara Bergh | Namibia | 4:37.03 | |
| 9 | 1 | Lena Begenisic | Serbia | 4:37.72 | |
| 10 | 3 | Neza Hren | Slovenia | 4:38.46 | |
| 11 | 1 | Rhalmane Hmidi Yasmin | Morocco | 4:38.47 | |
| 12 | 3 | Solveig Hakonardottir | Iceland | 4:38.76 | |
| 13 | 8 | Isabela Matarrita | Costa Rica | 4:45.11 | |
| 14 | 4 | Kate Galatopoulos | Cayman Islands | 4:45.87 | |
| 15 | 7 | Rhanya Santo | Angola | 4:50.24 | |
| 16 | 2 | Orgilmaa Badrakh | Mongolia | 4:51.13 | |
| 17 | 8 | Mary Peyton Suubi | Uganda | 4:52.59 | |
| 18 | 3 | Serina Mehyar | Jordan | 4:57.52 | |
| 19 | 6 | Daniella Maitaishe Viki | Zimbabwe | 5:02.74 | |
| 20 | 5 | Elya Qiana Powdar | Suriname | 5:14.65 | |
| 21 | 2 | Malika Erina Aidy Camara | Ivory Coast | 6:08.34 | |
