= Honduras at the 2025 Junior Pan American Games =

- IOC code: HON
- NOC: Honduran Olympic Committee

in Asunción, Paraguay
- Competitors: 14
- Flag bearers: Helena Linares; Diego Dulieu
- Medals: Gold 0 Silver 0 Bronze 0 Total 0

Junior Pan American Games appearances (overview)
- 2021; 2025

Honduras competed at the 2025 Junior Pan American Games in Asunción, Paraguay from August 9 to 23, 2025.

The Honduran team consists of 14 athletes, however, the country failed to win a medal.

== Competitors ==
The following is the list of number of competitors (per gender) participating at the games per sport/discipline.

Sport	Men	Women	Total
Athletics	1	1	2
Cycling BMX Freestyle	1	0	1
Cycling Road	1	0	1
Fencing	0	2	2
Swimming	2	2	4
Taekwondo	0	1	1
Triathlon	0	1	1
Weightlifting	0	1	1
Wrestling	1	0	1
Total	6	8	14

== See also ==
- Honduras at the Junior Pan American Games
