= Bermuda at the 2025 Junior Pan American Games =

- IOC code: BER
- NOC: Bermuda Olympic Association

in Asunción, Paraguay
- Competitors: 24
- Medals: Gold 0 Silver 2 Bronze 1 Total 3

Junior Pan American Games appearances (overview)
- 2021; 2025

Bermuda is competing at the 2025 Junior Pan American Games in Asunción from August 9 to 23, 2025.

The Bermudian team consists of 24 athletes competing in 3 sports.

== Medals by sport ==
Sport	Gold	Silver	Bronze	Total
Athletics	0	1	0	1
Sailing	0	1	0	1
Swimming	0	0	1	1
Totals (3 entries)	0	2	1	3

== Medalists ==
The following Bermudian competitors won medals at the games.

Medal	Name	Sport	Event	Date
Silver	Sebastian Kempe	Sailing	One-person Dinghy (ILCA 7)	August 17
Silver	Caitlyn Bobb	Athletics	Women's 400m	August 20
Bronze	Jack Harvey	Swimming	Men's 100m backstroke	August 12

== See also ==
- Bermuda at the Junior Pan American Games
