= Bahamas at the 2025 Junior Pan American Games =

- IOC code: BAH
- NOC: Bahamas Olympic Committee

in Asunción, Paraguay
- Competitors: 15
- Medals: Gold 1 Silver 1 Bronze 2 Total 4

Junior Pan American Games appearances (overview)
- 2021; 2025

The Bahamas competed at the 2025 Junior Pan American Games in Asunción, Paraguay from August 9 to 23, 2025.

The Bahamian team consisted of 15 athletes.

== Medals by sport ==
Sport	Gold	Silver	Bronze	Total
Sailing	1	0	0	1
Swimming	0	1	1	2
Judo	0	0	1	1
Totals (3 entries)	1	1	2	4

== Medalists ==
The following Bahamian competitors won medals at the games.

Medal	Name	Sport	Event	Date
Gold	Eliza Denning	Sailing	Women's One-person Dinghy (ILCA 6)	August 17
Silver	Lamar Taylor	Swimming	Men's 50m Freestyle	August 13
Bronze	Lamar Taylor	Swimming	Men's 100m Freestyle	August 12
Bronze	Xavion Johnson	Judo	Men's -66kg	August 10

== See also ==
- Bahamas at the Junior Pan American Games
