= Jamaica at the 2025 Junior Pan American Games =

- IOC code: JAM
- NOC: Jamaica Olympic Association

in Asunción, Paraguay 9 August 2025 – 23 August 2025
- Competitors: 115 in 12 sports
- Flag bearers (opening): Sabrina Lyn; Shea Martin
- Flag bearers (closing): Mattea Issa; Tyler Tracy
- Officials: TBA, chef de mission
- Medals: Gold 4 Silver 5 Bronze 6 Total 15

Junior Pan American Games appearances (overview)
- 2021; 2025

Jamaica is scheduled to compete at the 2025 Junior Pan American Games in Asunción Paraguay, from 9 to 23 August 2025.

The Jamaican team consisted of 114 athletes across 12 competing in 12 sporting disciplines.

== Medallists ==
The following Jamaican competitors won medals at the games. In the by discipline sections below, medalists' names are bolded.

Medal	Name	Sport	Event	Date
Gold	Racquil Broaderick	Athletics	Men's Discus	August 22
Gold	Jasauna Dennis	Athletics	Men's 400m	August 20
Gold	Tyreece Hyman	Athletics	Men's 400m hurdles	August 20
Gold	Sabrina Dockery; Marissa Palmer; Serena Cole; Alana Reid	Athletics	Women's 4 × 100 metres relay	August 21
Silver	Andrew Riquelme Reid; Jehlani Gordon; Odaine Crooks; Bouwahjgie Nkrumie	Athletics	Men's 4 × 100 metres relay	August 21
Silver	Omary O'coner Robinson; Jasauna Dennis; Kevin Bliss; Tyreece Hyman	Athletics	Men's 4 × 400 metres relay	August 22
Silver	Shanique Williams; Oneika Shaneil Brissett; Daynea Colstock; Shanakaye Anderson	Athletics	Women's 4 × 400 metres relay	August 22
Silver	Sabrina Lyn	Swimming	Women's 100m breaststroke	August 10
Silver	Christopher Taylor	Athletics	Men's Discus	August 22
Bronze	Collin McKenzie	Swimming	Men's 100m breaststroke	August 10
Bronze	Romario Stewart	Athletics	Men's 400m hurdles	August 20
Bronze	Chavez Penn	Athletics	Men's Triple Jump	August 22
Bronze	Daynea Colstock	Athletics	Women's 400m hurdles	August 20
Bronze	Shanakeye Anderson	Athletics	Women's 400m	August 20
Bronze	Tyler Tracy	Wrestling	Men's 74kg Freestyle	August 22

== Competitors ==
The following is the list of number of competitors participating at the Games per sport/discipline.

Sport	Men	Women	Total
Archery	1	0	1
Athletics	25	25	50
Badminton	1	2	3
Cycling	0	1	1
Diving	0	1	1
Fencing	1	0	1
Golf	1	1	2
Rugby	12	12	24
Sailing	1	0	1
Swimming	3	2	5
Tennis	2	0	2
Wrestling	1	0	1
Total	48	44	92

== Athletics ==
Jamaica entered over 40 athletes, one per gender.

Key

- Note–Ranks given for track events are within the athlete's heat only
- Q = Qualified for the next round
- q = Qualified for the next round as a fastest loser
- Bye = Athlete not required to compete in round

Men

Track events

Athlete	Event	Semifinal		Final	
Athlete	Event	Result	Rank	Result	Rank
Bouwahjgie Nkrumie	100m				

Field events

Athlete	Event	Semifinal		Final	
Athlete	Event	Result	Rank	Result	Rank
Racquil Brodrick	Discus				1st 🥇

Women

Track events

Athlete	Event	Final	
Athlete	Event	Distance	Position
Alana Reid	100m		

== Archery ==
Jamaica qualified 1 athlete

- Male - Jacob Mighty

== Badminton ==
Jamaica qualified 4 athletes

- Breanna Bisnott
- Amir Mcbean
- Mikaelah Mustafaa
- Keyon'Dre Mcbean

== Cycling ==
Jamaica had one athlete

- Female Melaika Russell (Sprints)

=== Track ===
Sprint

Athlete	Event	Qualification		Round 1	Repechage 1	Round 2	Repechage 2	Round 3	Repechage 3	Quarterfinals	Semifinals	Finals / BM	
Athlete	Event	Time Speed (km/h)	Rank	Opposition Time Speed (km/h)	Opposition Time Speed (km/h)	Opposition Time Speed (km/h)	Opposition Time Speed (km/h)	Opposition Time Speed (km/h)	Opposition Time Speed (km/h)	Opposition Time Speed (km/h)	Opposition Time Speed (km/h)	Opposition Time Speed (km/h)	Rank
Melaika Russell	Women's sprint	12.789	14	Did not advance									14

== Diving ==
Jamaica qualified 1 athlete.

- Jala Wilson - 3m Springboard

== Fencing ==
Jamaica qualified 1 athlete.

- Shai Martin

== Golf ==
Jamaica qualified 2 athletes.

- Mattea Issa
- Trey Williams Jr.

== Rugby sevens ==
Jamaica qualified both men's and women's under 20 Rugby 7s squads.

=== Women's Rugby Sevens Squad ===
- DEJONAYE COLE (ST. ELIZABETH/BBCOKE HIGH SCHOOL)
- TALESHA RUSSELL (ST. ELIZABETH/BBCOKE HIGH SCHOOL)
- YIANA WILSON (ST. ELIZABETH/BBCOKE HIGH SCHOOL)
- ZOEY WILLIAMS (ST. ELIZABETH/BBCOKE HIGH SCHOOL)
- RIHANNA OSBOURNE (ST. ELIZABETH/BBCOKE HIGH SCHOOL)
- ITALIA EUWITT (ST. CATHERINE/JONATHAN GRANT HIGH SCHOOL)
- BRITANY BRIGGS (KINGSTON/NORMAN MANLEY HIGH SCHOOL)
- ADINA HUNTER (UNIVERSITY OF LOUGHBOROUGH)
- JUSTINE PAPAKIRYKOS (Canada/UNIVERSITY OF OTTAWA)
- ANNA JONES MAGRA (Canada/NIAGARA UNIVERSITY)
- CHEVELLE CLARKE (England/LEEDS BECKETT UNIVERSITY)

=== Men's Rugby Sevens Squad ===
- 1 AHMEEIGKE MILLER (ST. CATHERINE/ST. CATHERINE THUNDERCATS)
- 2 TYREKE HUTCHINSON (KINGSTON, ST. ANDREW/CAVALIERS RUGBY CLUB)
- 3 LUKE ELLIOT (KINGSTON/NORMAN MANLEY HIGH SCHOOL)
- 4 BRANDON GORDON (ST. CATHERINE/JONATHAN GRANT HS)
- 5 ONIEL WILLIAMS (KINGSTON, ST ANDREW/CAVALIERS RUGBY CLUB)
- 6 MICHEAL GRAY (ST. CATHERINE/INNSWOOD HIGH SCHOOL)
- 7 KWESI SHANNON (ST. CATHERINE/SPANISH TOWN HIGH SCHOOL)
- 8 NATHANIEL MCDONALD (ST. CATHERINE/SPANISH TOWN HIGH SCHOOL)
- 9 JAIDEN BLAKE (CLARENDON/JOSE MARTI TECHNICAL HS)
- 10 MATTEO CHERWAYKO(C) (CLARENDON/NOTTINGHAM TRENT UNIV)
- 11 DIDIER TAYLOR (ENGLAND/MANCHESTER METRO UNIV)
- 12 AHARON GRAHAM-MULVANEY (ST ANN/CLARENDON/LOUGHBOROUGH COLLEGE)

== Sailing ==
Jamaica qualified 1 athlete.

- Jonathon Reece Schwartz - ILCA 7

Men

Athlete	Event	Opening series												Finals		
Athlete	Event	1	2	3	4	5	6	7	8	9	10	Points	Rank	M / F	Points	Rank
Jonathon Reece Schwartz	Laser															

== Swimming ==
Jamaica qualified 5 athletes

Men's

- Collin McKenzie
- Nathaniel Thomas
- Kito Campbell

Women's

- Sabrina Lyn

== Tennis ==
Jamaica qualified 40 plus athletes

Men

Athlete	Event	Group stage			Round of 32	Round of 16	Quarterfinal	Semifinal	Final / BM	
Athlete	Event	Opposition Result	Opposition Result	Rank	Opposition Result	Opposition Result	Opposition Result	Opposition Result	Opposition Result	Rank
TBA	Singles	—N/a								
TBA	Singles	—N/a								
TBA; TBA	Doubles	—N/a								
TBA; TBA	Team				—N/a					

== Wrestling ==
Jamaica entered only 1 athlete

Key:

- VT (ranking points: 5–0 or 0–5) – Victory by fall.
- VB (ranking points: 5–0 or 0–5) – Victory by injury (VF for forfeit, VA for withdrawal or disqualification)
- PP (ranking points: 3–1 or 1–3) – Decision by points – the loser with technical points.
- PO (ranking points: 3–0 or 0–3) – Decision by points – the loser without technical points.
- ST (ranking points: 4–0 or 0–4) – Great superiority – the loser without technical points and a margin of victory of at least 8 (Greco-Roman) or 10 (freestyle) points.
- SP (ranking points: 4–1 or 1–4) – Technical superiority – the loser with technical points and a margin of victory of at least 8 (Greco-Roman) or 10 (freestyle) points.

Men

Freestyle

Athlete	Event	Quarterfinal	Semifinal	Final / BM	
Athlete	Event	Opposition Result	Opposition Result	Opposition Result	Rank
Tyler Tracy	Freestyle 74 kg	Tanner Peake (PUR); W 9–4^{PP}	Orilandy Pedromo Brooks (CUB); L 0–10ST	Joao Maldonado (PAR); W 10–0ST	3rd place, bronze medalist(s)
