= Elvira Espinosa =

Ecuadorian swimmer (born 2009)

Personal information
- Nationality: Ecuadorian
- Born: 20 January 2009 (age 17)

Sport
- Sport: Swimming
Medal record
Women's swimming
Representing Ecuador
Youth Olympic Games
Gold medal – first place	2026 Dakar	400 m freestyle

Elvira Espinosa (born 20 January 2009) is an Ecuadorian swimmer.

== Career ==
In November 2026, Espinosa represented Ecuador at the 2026 Summer Youth Olympics where she served as the flag bearer during the opening ceremony. On the first day of the competition she won a gold medal in the 400 metre freestyle with a personal best time of 4:22.87. She became first Ecuadorian female athlete to win gold at any Youth Olympic Games. She also became the first Ecuadorian swimmer to medal at either the Youth Olympic Games or senior Olympic Games. This was the first gold medal event of the 2026 Summer Youth Olympics.
