= Swimming at the 2025 Junior Pan American Games =

Swimming at the 2025 Junior American Games
- Swimming pictograms
- Venue: Olympic Aquatic Centre
- Start date: August 10, 2025
- End date: August 14, 2025
- No. of events: 36
- Competitors: 272

The swimming events at the 2025 Junior Pan American Games were held at the Olympic Aquatic Centre, located in the Olympic Park in Luque, in the Greater Asuncion area. The events were contested between August 10 and 14, 2025.

36 events were contested, 28 individual events (17 men and 17 women) and six relays (two men, two women, and two mixed). The winner of each event qualified for the 2027 Pan American Games in Lima, Peru.

== Qualification ==
A total of 272 swimmers qualified for the events. As host country, Paraguay automatically will qualify 14 male and 14 female competitors in the pool. Each National Olympic Committee (NOC) may use proven swim times attained during the qualification period of those swimmers who have met the qualifying standards established by the UANA for the 2025 Junior Pan American Games at recognized championships and competitions.

=== Swimming qualification times ===
Two time standards were given as a way to qualify to the events: a qualification time (PTQ / "A" Time) and a selection time (PST / "B" Time):

	Men		Women	
Event	A standard time	B standard time	A standard time	B standard time
50 m freestyle	26.03	27.69	26.03	27.69
100 m freestyle	57.35	1:00.80	57.35	1:00.80
200 m freestyle	2:04.10	2:12.02	2:04.10	2:12.02
400 m freestyle	4:20.76	4:36.18	4:20.76	4:36.18
800 m freestyle	8:58.95	9:30.81	8:58.95	9:30.81
1500 m freestyle	17:06.05	18:06.71	17:06.05	18:06.71
100 m backstroke	1:03.37	1:07.41	1:03.37	1:07.41
200 m backstroke	2:19.78	2:28.70	2:19.78	2:28.70
100 m breaststroke	1:11.36	1:15.91	1:11.36	1:15.91
200 m breaststroke	2:35.15	2:45.05	2:35.15	2:45.05
100 m butterfly	1:01.11	1:05.01	1:01.11	1:05.01
200 m butterfly	2:16.14	2:24.19	2:16.14	2:24.19
200 m individual combined	2:20.39	2:29.35	2:20.39	2:29.35
400 m individual combined	5:02.46	5:20.34	5:02.46	5:20.34

== Medal summary ==
=== Medal table ===
* Host nation (Paraguay)

Rank	Nation	Gold	Silver	Bronze	Total
1	Brazil	24	12	7	43
2	Argentina	6	7	3	16
3	Mexico	2	4	9	15
4	Guatemala	2	0	0	2
5	Colombia	1	4	5	10
6	Panama	1	1	0	2
7	Puerto Rico	1	0	1	2
8	Chile	0	2	3	5
9	Venezuela	0	2	0	2
10	Bahamas	0	1	1	2
10	Jamaica	0	1	1	2
12	Virgin Islands	0	1	0	1
13	Peru	0	0	2	2
13	Trinidad and Tobago	0	0	2	2
15	Bermuda	0	0	1	1
15	Guyana	0	0	1	1
15	Uruguay	0	0	1	1
Totals (17 entries)		37	35	37	109

=== Medalists ===
==== Men's events ====
Event	Gold		Silver		Bronze	
50 m freestyle	Guilherme Caribé; Brazil	21.72 JPR	Lamar Taylor; Bahamas	22.11	Nikoli Blackman; Trinidad and Tobago Pedro Sansone; Brazil	22.32
100 m freestyle	Guilherme Caribé; Brazil	47.54 JPR	Andrés Dupont; Mexico	48.14 NR	Lamar Taylor; Bahamas	48.51 NR
200 m freestyle	Stephan Steverink; Brazil	1:47.23 JPR	Eduardo Cisternas; Chile	1:47.99 NR	Matías Santiso; Argentina	1:50.03
400 m freestyle	Stephan Steverink; Brazil	3:46.71 JPR	Eduardo Cisternas; Chile	3:49.40 NR	Leonardo Alcântara; Brazil	3:50.55
800 m freestyle	Stephan Steverink; Brazil	7:54.49 JPR	João Pierre Campos; Brazil	8:00.99	Paulo Strehlke; Mexico	8:02.87
1500 m freestyle	João Pierre Campos; Brazil	15:19.77 JPR	Matheus Melecchi; Brazil	15:21.13	Santiago Gutiérrez; Mexico	15:45.58
100 m backstroke	Ulises Saravia; Argentina	53.89 JPR	Maximillian Wilson; Virgin Islands	54.31 NR	Jack Harvey; Bermuda	54.69
200 m backstroke	Humberto Najera; Mexico	1:57.44 JPR, NR	Samuel Lopes; Brazil	2:00.65	Edhy Vargas; Chile	2:00.85 NR
100 m breaststroke	Xavier Flores; Puerto Rico	1:00.84	Guilherme Camossato; Brazil	1:01.26	Collin McKenzie; Jamaica	1:01.53 NR
200 m breaststroke	Roberto Bonilla; Guatemala	2:12.60 JPR, NR	Guilherme Camossato; Brazil	2:12.69	Mariano Angeli; Chile	2:14.23
100 m butterfly	Lúcio Flávio Filho; Brazil	51.78 JPR	Ulises Cazau; Argentina	52.29	Diego Balbi; Peru	53.08
200 m butterfly	Gustavo Saldo; Brazil	1:58.95 JPR	Gabriel Moura; Brazil	1:59.45	Noel Raekwon; Guyana	1:59.46 NR
200 m individual medley	Roberto Bonilla; Guatemala	2:00.89 JPR, NR	Stephan Steverink; Brazil	2:01.83	Xavier Flores; Puerto Rico	2:02.66
400 m individual medley	Stephan Steverink; Brazil	4:16.06 JPR	Guilherme Kanzler; Brazil	4:18.15	Maximiliano Cuevas; Mexico	4:22.24
4 × 100 m freestyle relay	Brazil; Gabriel Machuco (50.07); Guilherme Caribé (48.59); Davi Zanella (50.28); Pedro Sansone (49.42); Lúcio Flávio Filho^{[a]} Samuel Lopes^{[a]} João Pierre Campos^{[a]} Gabriel Moura^{[a]}	3:18.36	Venezuela; Dennis Pérez (50.56); Jorge Otaiza (49.67); Manuel G. Díaz (50.66); Emil Pérez (49.49)	3:20.38	Trinidad and Tobago; Nikoli Blackman (49.18); Zarek Wilson (50.24); Zachary Anthony (50.25); Johann-Mathew Matamoro (50.98)	3:20.65 NR
4 × 200 m freestyle relay	Brazil; Davi Zanella (1:51.01); Gabriel Moura (1:50.17); Gabriel Machuco (1:50.19); Stephan Steverink (1:47.12)	7:18.49 JPR	Mexico; Andrés Dupont (1:49.43); José Cano (1:51.74); Paulo Strehlke (1:50.48); David Medina (1:50.47)	7:22.12	Chile; Eduardo Cisternas (1:49.66); Mariano Angeli (1:51.65); Edhy Vargas (1:52.52); Elías Ardiles (1:52.43)	7:26.26 NR
4 × 100 m medley relay	Argentina; Ulises Saravia (53.76); Dante Rho (1:01.72); Ulises Cazau (52.23); Matías Santiso (48.82); José Materano^{[a]} Matías Chaillou^{[a]}	3:36.53 JPR, NR	Brazil; Samuel Lopes (55.71); Guilherme Camossato (1:01.39); Lúcio Flávio Filho (52.06); Pedro Sansone (49.43); Gustavo Saldo^{[a]} Davi Zanella^{[a]}	3:38.59	Mexico; Humberto Najera (55.10); Marco Pat (1:03.55); Nicolas Macías (53.42); Andrés Dupont (48.43); Diego Camacho^{[a]} Rafael Arizpe^{[a]} Alfredo Velázquez^{[a]}	3:40.50
Men's 10 km	Paulo Strehlke; Mexico	1:50:01	Matheus Melecchi; Brazil	1:50.05	Leonardo Macedo; Brazil	1:53:03

^{a} Swimmers who participated in the heats only and received medals.

==== Women's events ====
Event	Gold		Silver		Bronze	
50 m freestyle	Stephanie Balduccini; Brazil Isabella Bedoya; Colombia	25.42 JPR	None awarded		Beatriz Bezerra; Brazil	25.62
100 m freestyle	Stephanie Balduccini; Brazil	54.91	Isabella Bedoya; Colombia	56.13	Angelina Solari; Uruguay	56.27
200 m freestyle	Stephanie Balduccini; Brazil	1:58.83 JPR	Maria Yagres; Venezuela	2:00.68	Tiffany Murillo; Colombia	2:01.82
400 m freestyle	Agostina Hein; Argentina	4:06.96 JPR	Letícia Romão; Brazil	4:14.29	Tiffany Murillo; Colombia	4:14.58 NR
800 m freestyle	Letícia Romão; Brazil	8:40.88 JPR	Tiffany Murillo; Colombia	8:48.35	Sharon Cho; Mexico	8:49.46
1500 m freestyle	Letícia Romão; Brazil	16:30.86 JPR	Tiffany Murillo; Colombia	16:48.89	Mariana de Oliveira; Brazil	16:49.95
100 m backstroke	Celia Pulido; Mexico	1:00.82 JPR	Celia Dieleke; Argentina	1:01.22	Julia Karla Góes; Brazil	1:02.82
200 m backstroke	Malena Santillán; Argentina	2:10.36 JPR, SA	Celia Pulido; Mexico	2:11.67	Cecilia Mabel Dieleke; Argentina	2:11.92
100 m breaststroke	Emily Santos; Panama	1:08.44 JPR	Sabrina Lyn; Jamaica	1:09.00	Stefanía Gómez; Colombia	1:09.56
200 m breaststroke	Agatha Amaral; Brazil	2:30.09	Emily Santos; Panama	2:30.17	Nichelly Lysy; Brazil	2:33.72
100 m butterfly	Joice Rocha; Brazil	59.70 JPR	Beatriz Bezerra; Brazil	59.82	María Méndez; Mexico	1:00.73
200 m butterfly	Ana Julia Amaral; Brazil	2:13.08 JPR	Samantha Baños; Colombia	2:13.53	Yasmin Silva; Peru	2:13.57
200 m individual medley	Agostina Hein; Argentina	2:12.12 JPR, NR	Fernanda Celidônio; Brazil	2:16.49	Isabella Chávez; Mexico	2:18.53
400 m individual medley	Agostina Hein; Argentina	4:38.41 JPR	Magdalena Portela; Argentina	4:49.44	Agatha Amaral; Brazil	4:50.82
4 × 100 m freestyle relay	Brazil; Fernanda Celidônio (56.45); Beatriz Bezerra (56.18); Julia Ariosa (56.93); Stephanie Balduccini (54.47); Ana Julia Amaral^{[a]} Joice Otero^{[a]} Carolina Daher^{[a]}	3:44.03 JPR	Mexico; María Fernanda Méndez (57.31); Valeria Villarreal (57.74); Fernanda Elizondo (57.18); Celia Pulido (55.54)	3:47.77	Argentina; Agostina Hein (56.30); Magdalena Portela (57.87); Malena Santillán (58.06); Lucía Gauna (56.53); Cecilia Dieleke^{[a]} Martina Urgelles^{[a]} Catalina Acacio^{[a]}	3:48.76
4 × 200 m freestyle relay	Brazil; Julia Ariosa (2:04.33); Fernanda Celidônio (2:02.00); Carolina Daher (2:02.05); Stephanie Balduccini (2:00.11); Mariana de Oliveira^{[a]} Joice Otero^{[a]} Leticia Silva^{[a]} Leticia Romão^{[a]}	8:08.49 JPR	Argentina; Agostina Hein (1:59.45 NR); Lucía Gauna (2:04.53); Magdalena Portela (2:04.64); Malena Santillán (2:02.22); Martina Urgelles^{[a]} Cecilia Dieleke^{[a]}	8:10.84	Colombia; María Santana (2:05.24); Samantha Baños (2:02.88); Isabella Budnik (2:04.85); Tiffany Murillo (2:01.69); Stefanía Gómez^{[a]}	8:14.66 NR
4 × 100 m medley relay	Brazil; Julia Karla Góes (1:02.30); Nichelly Lysy (1:09.29); Joice Otero (59.51); Stephanie Balduccini (54.82)	4:05.92 JPR	Argentina; Cecilia Dieleke (1:03.00); Catalina Acacio (1:12.22); Agostina Hein (1:00.48); Lucía Gauna (56.74)	4:12.44	Mexico; Celia Pulido (1:01.74); Mariana Ortega (1:13.00); María Mendez (59.83); Fernanda Elizondo (57.91)	4:12.48
Women's 10 km	Cibelle Jungblut; Brazil	2:01:14	Ana Abad; Ecuador	2:01:17	Paulina Alanís; Mexico	2:01:32

^{a} Swimmers who participated in the heats only and received medals.

==== Mixed ====
Event	Gold		Silver		Bronze	
4 × 100 m freestyle relay	Brazil; Guilherme Caribé (48.50); Pedro Sansone (49.46); Beatriz Bezerra (55.96); Stephanie Balduccini (54.93); Gabriel Moura^{[a]} Gustavo Saldo^{[a]} Carolina Daher^{[a]} Julia Ariosa^{[a]}	3:28.85 JPR	Argentina; Matías Santiso (49.76); Matías Chaillou (49.83); Agostina Hein (55.60); Lucía Gauna (56.14); Ulises Saravia^{[a]} Magdalena Portela^{[a]}	3:31.33 NR	Mexico; Diego Camacho (51.28); Andrés Dupont (48.19); María Mendez (57.39); Celia Pulido (55.63); Alfredo Velasquez^{[a]} Andrea González^{[a]} Valeria Villarreal^{[a]}	3:32.49
4 × 100 m medley relay	Brazil; Julia Karla Góes (1:03.96); Guilherme Camossato (1:01.07); Lúcio Flávio Filho (52.37); Stephanie Balduccini (54.15); Sophia Penteriche^{[a]} Fernanda Celidônio^{[a]} Gustavo Saldo^{[a]} Davi Zanella^{[a]}	3:51.55 JPR	Argentina; Ulises Saravia (54.18); Dante Nicola (1:02.90); Agostina Hein (58.57); Lucía Gauna (56.37); Cecilia Dieleke^{[a]} Ulises Cazau^{[a]} Magdalena Portela^{[a]}	3:52.02	Colombia; Gabriel Arias (57.00); Juan José Giraldo (1:02.43); Samantha Baños (1:01.32); María Santana (57.26)	3:58.01

^{a} Swimmers who participated in the heats only and received medals.
