= Beatriz Bezerra =

Brazilian swimmer (born 2006)

Personal information
- National team: Brazil
- Born: 1 March 2006 (age 20) Brazil

Sport
- Sport: Swimming
- Strokes: Butterfly, freestyle
Medal record
Women's swimming
Representing Brazil
Event	1st	2nd	3rd
World Junior Championships	0	2	1
South American Youth Games	5	1	0
Total	5	3	1
World Junior Championships
Silver medal – second place	2022 Lima	50 m butterfly
Silver medal – second place	2022 Lima	100 m butterfly
Bronze medal – third place	2022 Lima	4×100 m freestyle
South American Youth Games
Gold medal – first place	2022 Rosario	50 m butterfly
Gold medal – first place	2022 Rosario	4×100 m freestyle
Gold medal – first place	2022 Rosario	4×100 m medley
Gold medal – first place	2022 Rosario	4×100 m mixed freestyle
Gold medal – first place	2022 Rosario	4×100 m mixed medley
Silver medal – second place	2022 Rosario	100 m butterfly

Beatriz Bezerra (born 1 March 2006) is a Brazilian competitive swimmer. At the 2022 World Junior Championships, she won silver medals in the 50-metre butterfly and 100-metre butterfly and a bronze medal in the 4×100-metre freestyle relay. She is a five-time gold medalist and one-time silver medalist at the 2022 South American Youth Games.

== Background ==
Bezerra was born 1 March 2006 in Brazil.

== Career ==
=== 2022 ===
In April and May, at the 2022 South American Youth Games, held in Rosario, Argentina, Bezerra won gold medals in the 50-metre butterfly, 4×100-metre freestyle relay, 4×100-metre medley relay, 4×100-metre mixed freestyle relay, and 4×100-metre mixed medley relay, as well as a silver medal in the 100-metre butterfly.

==== 2022 World Junior Championships ====
At the 2022 FINA World Junior Swimming Championships, held starting 30 August in Lima, Peru, 16-year-old Bezerra won her first medal of the Championships on day four with a silver medal in the 50-metre butterfly, finishing second behind 15-year-old Jana Pavalić of Croatia in the final with a personal pest time of 26.67 seconds. She won her second medal the following day, splitting the third-fastest second leg relay time in the final of the 4×100-metre freestyle relay, less than two seconds slower than the fastest second leg swimmer Nikolett Pádár of Hungary, to help win the bronze medal with a final time of 3:50.13. The sixth and final day of competition, she won her third medal, a silver medal in the 100-metre butterfly with a personal best time of 59.69 seconds. Her three medals helped tie the all-time best medal table performance for Brazil at a single FINA World Junior Swimming Championships, a record of five total medals, one gold, three silver, and one bronze, from the first edition of the competition, held in 2006. In her other four events, she placed fifth in the finals of the 4×100-metre mixed medley relay and the 4×100-metre mixed freestyle relay, placed sixth in the final of the 100-metre freestyle with a personal best time of 56.97 seconds, and placed sixth in the final of the 50-metre freestyle with a personal best time of 26.28 seconds.

At the 2022 Carlos Campos Sobrinho Trophy in late November in Recife, Bezerra won the 100-metre butterfly with a new competition record of 1:00.44 after first setting a new competition record of 1:00.81 in the preliminaries.

=== 2023 ===
On 30 May, the first day of the 2023 Brazil National Swimming Championships in Recife, 17-year-old Bezerra placed sixth in the final of the 100-metre butterfly with a time of 1:00.55. Three days later, she won her heat of the 50-metre butterfly in the preliminaries with a personal best time of 26.57 seconds and qualified for the evening final. In the final she lowered her personal best time by three-tenths of a second to a 2023 World Aquatics Championships qualifying time of 26.27 seconds to win the silver medal, finishing just 0.01 seconds behind gold medalist 18-year-old Celine Bispo.

== International championships (50 m) ==
Meet	50 free	100 free	50 fly	100 fly	4×100 free	4×100 medley	4×100 mixed free	4×100 mixed medley
SAYG 2022 (age: 16)			(gold) (27.60)	(silver) (1:01.73)	(gold) (3:49.36)	(gold) (4:18.86)	(gold) (3:39.80)	(gold) (3:58.32)
WJC 2022 (age: 16)	6th (26.28)	6th (56.97)	(silver) (26.67)	(silver) (59.69)	(bronze) (3:50.13)		5th (3:36.24)	5th (3:59.50)

== Personal best times ==
=== Long course metres (50 m pool) ===
Event	Time	Meet	Location	Date	Ref
50 m freestyle	26.28	2022 World Junior Championships	Lima, Peru	4 September 2022	
100 m freestyle	56.97	2022 World Junior Championships	Lima, Peru	1 September 2022	
50 m butterfly	26.27	2023 Brazil National Swimming Championships	Recife	2 June 2023	
100 m butterfly	59.69	2022 World Junior Championships	Lima, Peru	4 September 2022	

== Awards and honours ==
- Brazilian Olympic Committee, Year-end Junior Athletes Retrospective, highlight: 2022
- Olimpíada Todo Dia, Youth Athletes Retrospective, highlight: 2022
