= Athletics at the 2021 Junior Pan American Games – Results =

These are the official results of the athletics competition at the 2021 Junior Pan American Games which took place between November 30 and December 4, 2021, at the Estadio Olímpico Pascual Guerrero in Cali, Colombia.

== Men's results ==
=== 100 meters ===
Heats – November 30
Wind:
Heat 1: -1.2 m/s, Heat 2: -0.5 m/s

Rank	Heat	Name	Nationality	Time	Notes
1	2	Erik Cardoso	Brazil	10.33	Q
2	2	Neiker Abello	Colombia	10.37	Q
3	1	Franco Florio	Argentina	10.38	Q
4	1	Lucas da Silva	Brazil	10.40	Q
5	2	Anderson Marquinez	Ecuador	10.62	Q
6	1	Carlos Flórez	Colombia	10.66	Q
6	2	Carlos Brown Jr.	Bahamas	10.66	q
8	1	César Almirón	Paraguay	10.67	q
9	1	Noelex Holder	Guyana	10.68	
10	2	Jenns Fernández	Cuba	10.76	
10	2	Julian Vargas	Bolivia	10.76	
12	1	Gerardo Lomeli	Mexico	10.77	
12	1	Jalen Lisse	Suriname	10.77	
14	2	Tomas Mondino	Argentina	10.92	

Final – December 1

Wind: -0.2 m/s

Rank	Lane	Name	Nationality	Time	Notes
1st place, gold medalist(s)	6	Erik Cardoso	Brazil	10.33	
2nd place, silver medalist(s)	4	Neiker Abello	Colombia	10.36	
3rd place, bronze medalist(s)	5	Franco Florio	Argentina	10.37	
4	3	Lucas da Silva	Brazil	10.40	
5	1	Carlos Brown Jr.	Bahamas	10.47	
6	2	Anderson Marquinez	Ecuador	10.62	
7	8	César Almirón	Paraguay	10.68	
8	7	Carlos Flórez	Colombia	10.78	

=== 200 meters ===
Heats – December 2
Wind:
Heat 1: +0.2 m/s, Heat 2: -0.7 m/s

Rank	Heat	Name	Nationality	Time	Notes
1	2	Lucas Vilar	Brazil	20.57	Q
2	1	Anderson Marquinez	Ecuador	20.68	Q
3	1	Lucas da Silva	Brazil	20.82	Q
4	2	Katriel Angulo	Ecuador	20.87	Q
5	2	Carlos Palacios	Colombia	20.94	Q
6	2	Bautista Diamante	Argentina	21.15	q
7	2	Carlos Brown Jr.	Bahamas	21.22	q
8	1	Jaleel Croal	British Virgin Islands	21.24	Q
9	1	José Yavier Figueroa	Puerto Rico	21.33	
10	2	Javier Martínez	Mexico	21.49	
11	1	Gerardo Lomeli	Mexico	21.61	
12	1	Darren Morgan-Jeffers	Saint Vincent and the Grenadines	21.77	
13	1	Agustín Pinti	Argentina	22.57	
	2	Shainer Reginfo	Cuba	DQ	

Final – December 3

Wind: +0.4 m/s

Rank	Lane	Name	Nationality	Time	Notes
1st place, gold medalist(s)	5	Anderson Marquinez	Ecuador	20.51	
2nd place, silver medalist(s)	4	Lucas Vilar	Brazil	20.59	
3rd place, bronze medalist(s)	3	Lucas da Silva	Brazil	20.68	
4	6	Katriel Angulo	Ecuador	20.80	
5	8	Jaleel Croal	British Virgin Islands	20.93	
6	7	Carlos Palacios	Colombia	21.16	
7	2	Bautista Diamante	Argentina	21.29	
	1	Carlos Brown Jr.	Bahamas	?	

=== 400 meters ===
Heats – December 1

Rank	Heat	Name	Nationality	Time	Notes
1	1	Luis Avilés	Mexico	46.23	Q
2	1	Javier Gómez	Venezuela	46.47	Q
3	2	Michael Joseph	Saint Lucia	46.53	Q
4	2	João Henrique Cabral	Brazil	47.02	Q
5	1	Leonardo Castillo	Cuba	47.18	Q
6	2	Gamali Felix	Grenada	47.64	Q
7	1	Alan Minda	Ecuador	48.11	q
8	2	Tahjay Liburd	Saint Kitts and Nevis	48.43	q
9	2	Revon Williams	Guyana	48.45	
10	2	Darren Morgan-Jeffers	Saint Vincent and the Grenadines	49.13	
11	2	Jair Díaz	Nicaragua	50.58	
12	1	Gary Neal	Belize	51.53	
	1	Douglas da Silva	Brazil	DNF	
	1	Wilbert Encarnación	Dominican Republic	DNF	

Final – December 2

Rank	Lane	Name	Nationality	Time	Notes
1st place, gold medalist(s)	4	Luis Avilés	Mexico	45.59	
2nd place, silver medalist(s)	7	Leonardo Castillo	Cuba	45.79	
3rd place, bronze medalist(s)	6	Javier Gómez	Venezuela	46.13	
4	8	Gamali Felix	Grenada	46.54	
5	9	Michael Joseph	Saint Lucia	46.57	
6	3	João Henrique Cabral	Brazil	47.03	
7	2	Alan Minda	Ecuador	47.75	
8	1	Tahjay Liburd	Saint Kitts and Nevis	49.11	

=== 800 meters ===
December 4

Rank	Name	Nationality	Time	Notes
1st place, gold medalist(s)	Ryan López	Venezuela	1:49.30	
2nd place, silver medalist(s)	Leonardo de Jesus	Brazil	1:50.14	
3rd place, bronze medalist(s)	Eduardo Moreira	Brazil	1:50.21	
4	Israel Tinajero	Mexico	1:50.43	
5	Dennick Luke	Dominica	1:50.79	
6	Estanislao Mendivil	Argentina	1:51.46	
7	Luis Peralta	Dominican Republic	1:54.80	
8	Julio Díaz	Mexico	1:55.67	
9	Timon Emanuel	Antigua and Barbuda	1:58.09	

=== 1500 meters ===
December 3

Rank	Name	Nationality	Time	Notes
1st place, gold medalist(s)	Juan Diego Castro	Costa Rica	3:44.10	
2nd place, silver medalist(s)	Santiago Catrofe	Uruguay	3:44.71	
3rd place, bronze medalist(s)	José Zabala	Argentina	3:45.79	
4	Leandro Pérez	Argentina	3:47.29	
5	Israel Tinajero	Mexico	3:50.39	
6	Brayan Jara	Chile	3:51.90	
7	Diego Adolfo García	Mexico	3:53.84	
8	Luis Peralta	Dominican Republic	3:58.25	
9	Sebastián López	Venezuela	3:59.22	
10	Carlos Vilches	Puerto Rico	4:08.01	

=== 5000 meters ===
November 30

Rank	Name	Nationality	Time	Notes
1st place, gold medalist(s)	David Ninavia	Bolivia	14:21.36	
2nd place, silver medalist(s)	Fábio Correia	Brazil	14:30.31	
3rd place, bronze medalist(s)	José Luis Chaupin	Peru	14:31.70	
4	Mario López	Mexico	14:55.07	
5	Miguel Hidalgo	Brazil	14:57.73	
6	Matias Reynaga	Argentina	15:06.03	
7	Arnaldo Martínez	Puerto Rico	15:07.16	
	Miguel Cruz	Peru	DNF	
	Gabriel Curtis	Bahamas	DNF	
	Diego Adolfo García	Mexico	DNF	

=== 10,000 meters ===
December 3

Rank	Name	Nationality	Time	Notes
1st place, gold medalist(s)	Hector Pagan	Puerto Rico	30:20.48	
2nd place, silver medalist(s)	Frank Lujan	Peru	30:58.68	
3rd place, bronze medalist(s)	Omar Castillo	Mexico	31:07.02	
4	Fábio Correia	Brazil	31:10.18	
5	Juliano de Araújo	Brazil	31:22.12	
6	Gabriel Curtis	Bahamas	31:53.64	
7	Esteban Angulo	Argentina	33:00.32	
8	Alex Caiza	Ecuador	33:07.24	
9	Arnaldo Martínez	Puerto Rico	34:25.36	
	Ángel Romero	Chile	DNF	
	David Ninavia	Bolivia	DQ	(Note: Illegal shoes)
	Víctor Zambrano	Mexico	DQ	(Note: Illegal shoes)
	José Luis Chaupin	Peru	DQ	(Note: Illegal shoes)

=== 110 meters hurdles ===
Heats – November 30
Wind:
Heat 1: -0.5 m/s, Heat 2: +0.1 m/s

Rank	Heat	Name	Nationality	Time	Notes
1	2	Marcos Herrera	Ecuador	13.95	Q
2	1	John Paredes	Colombia	14.09	Q
3	1	Guillermo Campos	Mexico	14.09	Q
4	1	Adrian Vieira	Brazil	14.24	Q
5	2	Martín Sáenz	Chile	14.28	Q
6	2	Vinícius Catai	Brazil	14.52	Q
7	1	Kevin Simisterra	Ecuador	14.55	q
8	2	Julian Berca	Argentina	14.92	q
9	2	Paolo Crose	Peru	15.21	

Final – December 4

Wind: -0.2 m/s

Rank	Lane	Name	Nationality	Time	Notes
1st place, gold medalist(s)	5	Marcos Herrera	Ecuador	13.94	
2nd place, silver medalist(s)	4	John Paredes	Colombia	13.95	
3rd place, bronze medalist(s)	3	Guillermo Campos	Mexico	14.05	
4	6	Martín Sáenz	Chile	14.06	
5	2	Kevin Simisterra	Ecuador	14.41	
6	7	Adrian Vieira	Brazil	14.42	
7	8	Vinícius Catai	Brazil	14.71	
8	1	Julian Berca	Argentina	14.88	

=== 400 meters hurdles ===
Heats – November 30

Rank	Heat	Name	Nationality	Time	Notes
1	1	Yoao Illas	Cuba	51.89	Q
2	1	Caio Teixeira	Brazil	52.11	Q
3	1	César Parra	Venezuela	52.16	Q
4	1	Sergio Armando Esquivel	Mexico	52.20	q
5	1	Cristóbal Muñoz	Chile	53.34	q
1	2	Lázaro Rodríguez	Cuba	51.09	Q
2	2	Matheus Coelho	Brazil	51.73	Q
3	2	Neider Abello	Colombia	53.07	Q
4	2	Byron Preciado	Ecuador	54.27	
	2	Guillermo Campos	Mexico	DNF	

Final – December 2

Rank	Lane	Name	Nationality	Time	Notes
1st place, gold medalist(s)	5	Yoao Illas	Cuba	50.91	
2nd place, silver medalist(s)	3	Caio Teixeira	Brazil	51.48	
3rd place, bronze medalist(s)	4	Matheus Coelho	Brazil	51.64	
4	6	Lázaro Rodríguez	Cuba	51.70	
5	2	Sergio Armando Esquivel	Mexico	51.91	
6	7	César Parra	Venezuela	52.10	
7	1	Cristóbal Muñoz	Chile	52.80	
8	8	Neider Abello	Colombia	53.70	

=== 3000 meters steeplechase ===
December 4

Rank	Name	Nationality	Time	Notes
1st place, gold medalist(s)	Julio Palomino	Peru	8:56.56	
2nd place, silver medalist(s)	César Daniel Gómez	Mexico	8:56.65	
3rd place, bronze medalist(s)	Tomas Vega	Argentina	9:05.61	
4	Vinícius Alves	Brazil	9:10.62	
5	Gerardo Villarreal	Mexico	9:11.60	
6	Carlos Santos	El Salvador	9:23.89	
7	Natan Nepomuceno	Brazil	9:34.23	
8	Ronald Mamani	Chile	9:38.71	
9	Reinaldo Delgado	Colombia	9:44.78	
10	Paulo de Jesús Gómez	Costa Rica	9:53.00	
11	Brandon Barrantes	Costa Rica	10:15.15	
12	Leudis Brooks	Cuba	10:21.18	
	Dylan Van Der Hock	Argentina	DNF	

=== 4 × 100 meters relay ===
December 2

Rank	Lane	Team	Competitors	Time	Notes
1st place, gold medalist(s)	7	Brazil	Adrian Vieira, Lucas Vilar, Erik Cardoso, Lucas da Silva	39.21	AU23R
2nd place, silver medalist(s)	3	Ecuador	Katriel Angulo, Anderson Marquinez, Steeven Salas, Kevin Simisterra	40.02	
3rd place, bronze medalist(s)	5	Argentina	Tomás Mondino, Agustín Pinti, Bautista Diamante, Franco Florio	40.63	
4	4	Mexico	Gerardo Lomeli, Guillermo Campos, Javier Martínez, Luis Avilés	41.55	
5	6	Dominican Republic	Angelo Feliz Luis, César Jasmin, Franquelo Pérez, Wilbert Encarnación	41.97	
	8	Colombia	Arnovis Dalmero, Carlos Palacios, John Paredes, Neiker Abello	DQ	

=== 4 × 400 meters relay ===
December 3

Rank	Team	Competitors	Time	Notes
1st place, gold medalist(s)	Ecuador	Katriel Angulo, Alan Minda, Anderson Marquinez, Steeven Salas	3:08.02	
2nd place, silver medalist(s)	Brazil	Matheus Coelho, João Henrique Cabral, Caio Teixeira, Douglas da Silva	3:08.42	
3rd place, bronze medalist(s)	Mexico	Guillermo Campos, Julio Díaz, Javier Martínez, Luis Avilés	3:08.85	
4	Venezuela	César Parra, Eubrig Maza, Javier Gómez, Ryan López	3:12.41	
	Dominican Republic	Angelo Feliz Luis, César Jasmin, Franquelo Pérez, Luis Peralta	DQ	

=== 20,000 meters walk ===
December 1

Rank	Name	Nationality	Time	Notes
1st place, gold medalist(s)	David Hurtado	Ecuador	1:21:55.03	
2nd place, silver medalist(s)	Matheus Corrêa	Brazil	1:22:18.90	
3rd place, bronze medalist(s)	José Ortiz	Guatemala	1:23:47.47	
4	César Herrera	Colombia	1:25:42.95	
5	Saúl Mena	Mexico	1:27:23.72	
6	Gonzalo Bustán	Ecuador	1:27:36.70	
7	Juan Calderón	Costa Rica	1:31:51.78	
8	Óscar Pop	Guatemala	1:33:39.29	
9	Paulo Henrique Ribeiro	Brazil	1:33:41.29	
10	Ismael Bernal	Mexico	1:33:41.47	
11	Noe Quispe	Peru	1:34:51.52	
	Juan José Soto	Colombia	DQ	
	Niel Salinas	Peru	DNF	

=== High jump ===
December 3

Rank	Name	Nationality	1.90	1.95	2.00	2.05	2.10	2.13	2.16	2.19	2.21	2.25	Result	Notes
1st place, gold medalist(s)	Erick Portillo	Mexico	–	–	–	–	o	o	o	xo	o	xxx	2.21	
2nd place, silver medalist(s)	Elton Petronilho	Brazil	–	–	o	o	o	o	xxo	xo	xxx		2.19	
3rd place, bronze medalist(s)	Kyle Alcine	Bahamas	–	–	o	o	o	o	o	xxo	xxx		2.19	
4	Pedro Álamos	Chile	–	–	–	o	o	xo	xxx				2.13	
5	Marcus Gelpi	Puerto Rico	–	–	o	o	o	xxx					2.10	
6	Nicolas Numair	Chile	o	–	o	o	xo	xxx					2.10	
7	Justin Herrera	Ecuador	–	o	xo	o	xxx						2.05	
8	Jimmy Lopes	Brazil	–	xo	o	xo	xxx						2.05	
9	David Bosquez	Panama	xxo	–	xxx								1.90	

=== Pole vault ===
December 4

Rank	Name	Nationality	4.50	4.65	4.80	4.90	5.00	5.10	5.15	5.20	5.30	Result	Notes
1st place, gold medalist(s)	Dyander Pacho	Ecuador	–	–	o	–	o	o	–	o	xxx	5.20	
2nd place, silver medalist(s)	Austin Ramos	Ecuador	–	xo	xo	o	xo	o	o	xxx		5.15	
3rd place, bronze medalist(s)	José Tomás Nieto	Colombia	–	–	–	–	o	xo	–	xxx		5.10	
4	Pablo Zaffaroni	Argentina	–	xo	o	o	o	xo	xxx			5.10	
5	Guillermo Correa	Chile	–	o	o	–	o	xx–	x			5.00	
6	Luis Fernández	Mexico	–	o	o	xxx						4.80	
7	Ernesto Orlando	Puerto Rico	–	o	xo	xxx						4.80	
8	Ignacio Sánchez	Peru	–	o	xxo	xxx						4.80	
9	Sebastián Martín	Chile	xxo	xxx								4.50	
	Carlos Mariano	Brazil	xxx									NM	
	Gabriel Cumba	Puerto Rico	xxx									NM	
	Josué García	Mexico	–	xxx								NM	

=== Long jump ===
December 1

Rank	Name	Nationality	#1	#2	#3	#4	#5	#6	Result	Notes
1st place, gold medalist(s)	Maikel Vidal	Cuba	x	7.88	7.97	2.42	x	7.94	7.97	
2nd place, silver medalist(s)	Kelsey Daniel	Trinidad and Tobago	5.79	7.74	7.64	7.90	x	7.82	7.90	
3rd place, bronze medalist(s)	Jhon Berrío	Colombia	x	7.82	7.55	7.61	7.67	7.03	7.82	
4	Arnovis Dalmero	Colombia	7.79	7.39	7.78	x	x	x	7.79	
5	Eubrig Maza	Venezuela	7.09	x	7.41	7.63	7.47	7.71	7.71	
6	Weslley Beraldo	Brazil	7.34	x	7.50	x	x	7.60	7.60	
7	Rasheed Miller	Costa Rica	7.09	6.75	7.58	7.46	7.12	x	7.58	
8	Gabriel Boza	Brazil	7.45	x	7.41	7.30	x	x	7.45	
9	Clement Campbell	Trinidad and Tobago	x	7.17	7.27				7.27	
10	Daniel Mustelier	Cuba	7.14	7.20	7.09				7.20	
11	Bruno Yoset	Uruguay	6.82	6.97	7.19				7.19	
12	Shawn Díaz	Puerto Rico	x	6.91	x				6.91	
13	Taeco O'Garro	Antigua and Barbuda	4.57	6.81	6.73				6.81	

=== Triple jump ===
December 4

Rank	Name	Nationality	#1	#2	#3	#4	#5	#6	Result	Notes
1st place, gold medalist(s)	Andy Hechavarría	Cuba	16.60	16.61	16.77	16.53	–	x	16.77	
2nd place, silver medalist(s)	Geiner Moreno	Colombia	15.57	16.24	16.29	16.35	16.41	16.29	16.41	
3rd place, bronze medalist(s)	Frixon Chila	Ecuador	15.44	15.48	15.41	15.59	16.12	x	16.12	
4	Arnovis Dalmero	Colombia	15.47	15.90	15.89	x	15.87	x	15.90	
5	Steeven Palacios	Ecuador	x	15.68	15.72	15.74	15.52	x	15.74	
6	Taeco O'Garro	Antigua and Barbuda	13.81	15.37	15.45	x	15.60	15.51	15.60	
7	César Jasmin	Dominican Republic	15.55	15.13	15.28	15.08	x	x	15.55	
8	Michael do Nascimento	Brazil	15.32	15.50	15.43	x	15.49	15.30	15.50	
9	Felipe da Silva	Brazil	x	x	15.42				15.42	
10	Víctor Castro	Mexico	13.29	15.36	14.80				15.36	
11	Luis Reyes	Chile	14.88	14.86	14.71				14.88	

=== Shot put ===
December 1

Rank	Name	Nationality	#1	#2	#3	#4	#5	#6	Result	Notes
1st place, gold medalist(s)	Nazareno Sasia	Argentina	17.87	18.88	20.08	18.35	19.68	20.04	20.08	
2nd place, silver medalist(s)	Ronald Grueso	Colombia	16.81	17.59	x	17.93	17.98	x	17.98	
3rd place, bronze medalist(s)	Juan Carley Vázquez	Cuba	17.83	x	17.69	x	17.85	x	17.85	
4	Jorge Luis Contreras	Puerto Rico	17.65	x	17.73	x	x	x	17.73	
5	Mauricio Machry	Brazil	17.12	17.13	17.61	x	x	17.42	17.61	
6	Camilo Reyes	Chile	15.81	16.64	17.38	x	16.93	x	17.38	
7	Marcelo Lopes	Brazil	16.54	16.75	16.60	x	16.04	x	16.75	

=== Discus throw ===
December 4

Rank	Name	Nationality	#1	#2	#3	#4	#5	#6	Result	Notes
1st place, gold medalist(s)	Lucas Nervi	Chile	53.01	61.08	54.71	56.41	56.51	58.93	61.08	
2nd place, silver medalist(s)	Mario Alberto Díaz	Cuba	59.98	59.23	58.83	57.12	60.77	x	60.77	
3rd place, bronze medalist(s)	Anyel Álvarez	Cuba	50.80	x	55.42	57.03	x	x	57.03	
4	Alan de Falchi	Brazil	x	48.68	56.27	x	56.48	x	56.48	
5	Nazareno Sasia	Argentina	50.21	x	x	55.69	x	x	55.69	
6	Jorge Luis Contreras	Puerto Rico	x	x	50.41	x	x	50.72	50.72	
7	Ronald Grueso	Colombia	44.67	x	47.18				47.18	
8	Tarajh Hudson	Bahamas	46.54	x	x	x	x	x	46.54	
9	Luís Fábio Rodrigues	Brazil	42.44	x	x				42.44	

=== Hammer throw ===
December 2

Rank	Name	Nationality	#1	#2	#3	#4	#5	#6	Result	Notes
1st place, gold medalist(s)	Alencar Pereira	Brazil	64.71	64.50	x	67.18	69.78	x	69.78	
2nd place, silver medalist(s)	Ronald Mencía	Cuba	x	66.25	66.00	67.23	66.62	x	67.23	
3rd place, bronze medalist(s)	Aldo Zavala	Mexico	x	62.33	63.95	62.90	65.08	60.67	65.08	
4	Jonathan Absalon	Mexico	x	62.97	x	60.91	62.16	63.87	63.87	
5	Daniel Leal	Chile	63.06	x	61.64	62.90	x	60.97	63.06	
6	Dylan Suárez	Costa Rica	62.26	62.60	59.64	x	59.89	62.50	62.60	
7	Julio Nobile	Argentina	61.05	61.52	59.27	60.19	59.99	x	61.52	
8	Sebastian Tommasi	Argentina	56.96	60.05	58.07	59.78	59.94	57.44	60.05	
9	Michael Soler	Puerto Rico	54.77	59.27	x				59.27	
10	Cristhian Suárez	Ecuador	55.33	57.71	53.02				57.71	
11	João Carlos de Souza	Brazil	50.28	51.77	x				51.77	

=== Javelin throw ===
November 30

Rank	Name	Nationality	#1	#2	#3	#4	#5	#6	Result	Notes
1st place, gold medalist(s)	Pedro Henrique Rodrigues	Brazil	73.79	x	67.84	74.41	x	69.48	74.41	
2nd place, silver medalist(s)	Luiz Maurício da Silva	Brazil	63.37	62.14	x	61.40	71.35	68.94	71.35	
3rd place, bronze medalist(s)	Tyriq Horsford	Trinidad and Tobago	66.58	x	68.35	68.95	66.45	71.33	71.33	
4	Jean Marcos Mairongo	Ecuador	68.36	70.41	67.39	67.81	x	65.80	70.41	
5	Lautaro Techera	Uruguay	63.64	68.40	66.84	47.71	32.46	63.06	68.40	
6	Yarovis Contreras	Cuba	66.02	64.94	61.10	63.03	65.82	63.31	66.02	
7	Oneyder García	Colombia	x	x	63.01	x	59.62	59.15	63.01	
8	Antonio Gabriel Ortiz	Paraguay	x	61.92	57.06	61.08	60.90	x	61.92	
9	Derek Otero	Puerto Rico	55.40	56.56	54.96				56.56	
10	Willian Torres	Ecuador	x	54.56	45.98				54.56	

=== Decathlon ===
November 30–December 1

The highest mark recorded in each event is highlighted in yellow

Rank	Athlete	Nationality	100m	LJ	SP	HJ	400m	110m H	DT	PV	JT	1500m	Points	Notes
1st place, gold medalist(s)	José Fernando Ferreira	Brazil	10.98	6.90	13.04	1.92	51.84	14.36	43.46	4.70	57.24	5:31.20	7360	
2nd place, silver medalist(s)	Esteban Ibáñez	El Salvador	11.07	7.10	10.68	1.98	50.06	14.86	30.46	3.90	49.13	4:44.39	6966	
3rd place, bronze medalist(s)	Damián Moretta	Argentina	11.01	6.60	11.07	1.86	48.52	14.98	34.00	4.10	48.46	4:43.12	6959	
4	Jonathan da Silva	Brazil	10.94	6.72	11.56	1.83	51.02	15.20	35.16	3.90	47.65	4:57.61	6733	
5	Julio Angulo	Colombia	10.92	6.76	11.66	1.92	48.84	14.97	35.34	3.10	43.94	5:18.99	6579	
6	Ricardo Mireles	Venezuela	12.08	6.50	10.60	1.95	53.63	16.08	23.39	3.30	51.24	4:28.77	6118	
7	Miguel Ramírez	Mexico	11.04	6.77	11.37	1.80	DQ	16.13	33.85	3.80	56.07	5:02.73	5851	
8	Anson Moses	Trinidad and Tobago	11.33	6.56	10.90	1.89	DQ	15.74	30.96	2.70	48.41	5:19.19	5295	

== Women's results ==
=== 100 meters ===
Heats – November 30
Wind:
Heat 1: 0.0 m/s, Heat 2: -0.5 m/s, Heat 3: -0.2 m/s

Rank	Heat	Name	Nationality	Time	Notes
1	2	Anahí Suárez	Ecuador	11.32	Q
2	1	Gabriela Mourão	Brazil	11.52	Q
3	3	Amya Clarke	Saint Kitts and Nevis	11.56	Q
4	1	Liranyi Alonso	Dominican Republic	11.57	Q
5	2	Natalia Linares	Colombia	11.63	Q
6	3	Laura Martínez	Colombia	11.66	Q
7	1	Mariandrée Chacón	Guatemala	11.72	q
8	2	Vida Caetano	Brazil	11.75	q
9	1	Guillermina Cossio	Argentina	11.75	
10	3	Orangy Jiménez	Venezuela	11.80	
11	1	Nicole Chala	Ecuador	11.86	
12	2	Zara Brown	British Virgin Islands	11.87	
12	3	Wilvely Santana	Dominican Republic	11.87	
14	1	Ulanda Lewis	Saint Vincent and the Grenadines	11.88	
14	3	Anaís Hernández	Chile	11.88	
16	2	Leticia Arispe	Bolivia	12.02	
17	3	Laura Moreira	Cuba	12.12	
18	3	Hilary Gladden	Belize	12.70	

Final – December 1

Wind: +0.1 m/s

Rank	Lane	Name	Nationality	Time	Notes
1st place, gold medalist(s)	4	Anahí Suárez	Ecuador	11.32	
2nd place, silver medalist(s)	3	Amya Clarke	Saint Kitts and Nevis	11.58	
3rd place, bronze medalist(s)	7	Natalia Linares	Colombia	11.60	
4	5	Liranyi Alonso	Dominican Republic	11.62	
5	6	Gabriela Mourão	Brazil	11.66	
6	2	Laura Martínez	Colombia	11.69	
7	8	Vida Caetano	Brazil	11.83	
8	1	Mariandrée Chacón	Guatemala	11.89	

=== 200 meters ===
Heats – December 2
Wind:
Heat 1: -1.4 m/s, Heat 2: -1.4 m/s

Rank	Heat	Name	Nationality	Time	Notes
1	1	Letícia Lima	Brazil	23.08	Q
2	2	Anahí Suárez	Ecuador	23.10	Q
3	2	Shary Vallecilla	Colombia	23.26	Q
4	2	Fiordaliza Cofil	Dominican Republic	23.33	Q
5	2	Rita Silva	Brazil	23.92	q
6	1	Keliza Smith	Guyana	24.08	Q
7	1	Mariandree Chacón	Guatemala	24.16	Q
8	1	Yunisleidy García	Cuba	24.51	q
9	2	Cristal Cuervo	Panama	24.63	
	1	Liranyi Alonso	Dominican Republic	DQ	
	2	Guillermina Cossio	Argentina	DQ	

Final – December 3

Wind: 0.0 m/s

Rank	Lane	Name	Nationality	Time	Notes
1st place, gold medalist(s)	4	Anahí Suárez	Ecuador	22.96	
2nd place, silver medalist(s)	3	Shary Vallecilla	Colombia	23.07	
3rd place, bronze medalist(s)	7	Fiordaliza Cofil	Dominican Republic	23.46	
4	5	Letícia Lima	Brazil	23.68	
5	1	Rita Silva	Brazil	23.81	
6	8	Mariandree Chacón	Guatemala	23.98	
7	2	Yunisleidy García	Cuba	24.16	
8	6	Keliza Smith	Guyana	24.30	

=== 400 meters ===
December 2

Rank	Lane	Name	Nationality	Time	Notes
1st place, gold medalist(s)	4	Fiordaliza Cofil	Dominican Republic	52.10	
2nd place, silver medalist(s)	8	Martina Weil	Chile	52.35	
3rd place, bronze medalist(s)	6	Tiffani Marinho	Brazil	52.67	
4	7	Angie Melisa Arévalo	Colombia	52.69	
5	2	Shalysa Wray	Cayman Islands	53.47	
6	5	Maria Victoria de Sena	Brazil	54.70	
7	3	Kenisha Phillips	Guyana	54.99	

=== 800 meters ===
December 1

Rank	Name	Nationality	Time	Notes
1st place, gold medalist(s)	Daily Cooper	Cuba	2:08.62	
2nd place, silver medalist(s)	Berdine Castillo	Chile	2:09.32	
3rd place, bronze medalist(s)	Verónica Ángel	Mexico	2:09.40	
4	Anita Poma	Peru	2:10.01	
5	Valeria González	Mexico	2:10.38	
6	Isabelle de Almeida	Brazil	2:11.05	
7	Emilly da Silva	Brazil	2:12.71	
8	Tania Guasace	Bolivia	2:14.98	
9	Angeli Garrido	Venezuela	2:19.17	
10	María de Lourdes Calderín	Cuba	2:19.91	
11	Raymari Albornoz	Venezuela	2:21.47	

=== 1500 meters ===
December 2

Rank	Name	Nationality	Time	Notes
1st place, gold medalist(s)	Anahí Álvarez	Mexico	4:20.68	
2nd place, silver medalist(s)	Verónica Ángel	Mexico	4:30.13	
3rd place, bronze medalist(s)	Laura Acuña	Chile	4:31.01	
4	María Sabag	Chile	4:34.07	
5	Gabriela Tardivo	Brazil	4:38.92	
6	Stefany López	Colombia	4:42.58	
7	María Eugenia Fairhurst	Argentina	4:44.63	
8	Alessandra Rodríguez	Puerto Rico	4:48.06	
9	Mikaela Smith	United States Virgin Islands	4:58.18	
	Isabelle de Almeida	Brazil	DNF	

=== 5000 meters ===
December 3

Rank	Name	Nationality	Time	Notes
1st place, gold medalist(s)	Anahí Álvarez	Mexico	15:52.80	
2nd place, silver medalist(s)	Maria Lucineida Moreira	Brazil	16:39.77	
3rd place, bronze medalist(s)	Laura Espinosa	Colombia	16:53.74	
4	Carmen Alder	Ecuador	17:02.45	
5	Mirelle da Silva	Brazil	17:03.84	
6	Sofia Isabel Mamani	Peru	17:23.46	
7	Virginia Huatarongo	Peru	17:27.91	
8	Anisleidis Ochoa	Cuba	17:34.84	
9	Sofia Luizaga	Bolivia	17:49.84	
10	Isabelle Dutranoit	Bermuda	17:51.79	

=== 10,000 meters ===
November 30

Rank	Name	Nationality	Time	Notes
1st place, gold medalist(s)	Sofia Isabel Mamani	Peru	34:43.80	
2nd place, silver medalist(s)	María de Jesús Ruiz	Mexico	35:02.77	
3rd place, bronze medalist(s)	Maria Lucineida Moreira	Brazil	35:10.83	
4	Sofia Luizaga	Bolivia	35:28.80	
5	Virginia Huatarongo	Peru	36:21.36	
6	Luisa Baca	Mexico	36:25.03	
7	Sofia Ivanko	Argentina	38:02.71	
8	Anna Tenorio	Ecuador	38:32.84	
9	Fabricia Stedille	Brazil	38:51.69	
9	Ana Rosario Ulin	Guatemala	41:03.61	
	Roslyn Monterroso	Guatemala	DNF	
	Angie Restrepo	Colombia	DNF	

=== 100 meters hurdles ===
December 3
Wind: -0.6 m/s

Rank	Lane	Name	Nationality	Time	Notes
1st place, gold medalist(s)	5	Greisys Roble	Cuba	13.07	
2nd place, silver medalist(s)	4	Ketiley Batista	Brazil	13.27	
3rd place, bronze medalist(s)	6	Keily Pérez	Cuba	13.33	
4	3	Micaela de Melo	Brazil	13.51	
5	7	Valentina Polanco	Argentina	13.79	
6	2	Nicole Caicedo	Ecuador	13.88	
7	1	Isanet González	Puerto Rico	14.43	
8	8	María Fernanda Patrón	Mexico	14.48	

=== 400 meters hurdles ===
Heats – November 30

Rank	Heat	Name	Nationality	Time	Notes
1	2	Chayenne da Silva	Brazil	57.40	Q
2	1	Valeria Cabezas	Colombia	57.53	Q
3	1	Ariliannis Colás	Cuba	57.89	Q
4	1	Marlene dos Santos	Brazil	59.07	Q
5	2	Darielys Sentelle	Cuba	59.64	Q
6	2	María Alejandra Murillo	Colombia	1:00.66	Q
7	2	Danna Barajas	Mexico	1:00.89	q
8	1	Yara Amador	Mexico	1:01.37	q
9	1	Génesis Gutiérrez	Venezuela	1:01.77	
10	2	Ariana Rivera	Nicaragua	1:04.44	
	1	Andreina Minda	Ecuador	DQ	

Final – December 2

Rank	Lane	Name	Nationality	Time	Notes
1st place, gold medalist(s)	5	Chayenne da Silva	Brazil	55.97	
2nd place, silver medalist(s)	6	Ariliannis Colás	Cuba	57.20	
3rd place, bronze medalist(s)	3	Valeria Cabezas	Colombia	57.49	
4	4	Darielys Sentelle	Cuba	58.07	
5	7	Marlene dos Santos	Brazil	59.86	
6	1	Yara Amador	Mexico	1:01.70	
7	2	Danna Barajas	Mexico	1:03.18	
	8	María Alejandra Murillo	Colombia	DQ	

=== 3000 meters steeplechase ===
December 4

Rank	Name	Nationality	Time	Notes
1st place, gold medalist(s)	Mirelle da Silva	Brazil	10:28.69	
2nd place, silver medalist(s)	Veronica Huacasi	Peru	10:39.70	
3rd place, bronze medalist(s)	Stefany López	Colombia	10:47.82	
4	Arian Chia	Mexico	10:57.62	
5	Clara Baiocchi	Argentina	11:04.33	
6	Lizbeth Vicuña	Ecuador	11:07.89	
7	Gabriela Tardivo	Brazil	11:16.06	
8	Leydi Raura	Ecuador	11:20.36	
9	Danu Flores	Peru	11:37.00	
10	Paola Cordero	Mexico	12:03.42	

=== 4 × 100 meters relay ===
December 2

Rank	Lane	Team	Competitors	Time	Notes
1st place, gold medalist(s)	3	Colombia	María Alejandra Murillo, Natalia Linares, Shary Vallecilla, Laura Martínez	43.59	AU23R
2nd place, silver medalist(s)	6	Brazil	Vida Caetano, Rita Silva, Letícia Lima, Gabriela Mourão	44.04	
3rd place, bronze medalist(s)	5	Ecuador	Nicole Chala, Anahí Suárez, Nicole Caicedo, Andreina Minda	44.56	
4	4	Dominican Republic	Fiordaliza Cofil, Liranyi Alonso, Milagros Duran, Wilvely Santana	44.86	
5	7	Chile	Anaís Hernández, María Trinidad Hurtado, Martina Weil, Rocío Muñoz	45.10	

=== 4 × 400 meters relay ===
December 3

Rank	Team	Competitors	Time	Notes
1st place, gold medalist(s)	Brazil	Maria Victoria de Sena, Marlene dos Santos, Chayenne da Silva, Tiffani Marinho	3:33.40	AU23R
2nd place, silver medalist(s)	Chile	Rocío Muñoz, Berdine Castillo, Anaís Hernández, Martina Weil	3:38.24	
3rd place, bronze medalist(s)	Mexico	Danna Barajas, Valeria González, Yara Amador, Verónica Ángel	3:48.21	
	Dominican Republic	Fiordaliza Cofil, Liranyi Alonso, Milagros Duran, Wilvely Santana	DQ	
	Venezuela	Angeli Garrido, Génesis Gutiérrez, Orangy Jiménez, Raymari Albornoz	DQ	

=== 20,000 meters walk ===
December 3

Rank	Name	Nationality	Time	Notes
1st place, gold medalist(s)	Glenda Morejón	Ecuador	1:33:54.16	
2nd place, silver medalist(s)	Mary Luz Andía	Peru	1:35:26.52	
3rd place, bronze medalist(s)	Laura Chalarca	Colombia	1:35:54.97	
4	Maidy Monge	Guatemala	1:37:28.91	
5	Rachelle De Orbeta	Puerto Rico	1:38:24.92	
6	Mayra Quispe	Bolivia	1:41:46.35	
7	Gabriela Muniz	Brazil	1:42:37.55	
8	María Fernanda Peinado	Guatemala	1:43:31.37	
9	Brigitte Coaquira	Peru	1:43:34.65	
10	Noelia Vargas	Costa Rica	1:47:44.71	
	Paula Milena Torres	Ecuador	DQ	
	Sofia Ramos	Mexico	DQ	

=== High jump ===
December 2

Rank	Name	Nationality	1.60	1.65	1.70	1.73	1.76	1.79	1.81	1.83	1.87	1.90	1.93	Result	Notes
1st place, gold medalist(s)	Jennifer Rodríguez	Colombia	–	–	o	–	o	o	o	o	xo	xo	xxx	1.90	=PB
2nd place, silver medalist(s)	Marysabel Senyu	Dominican Republic	–	–	o	–	o	o	o	o	xxx			1.81	
3rd place, bronze medalist(s)	Arielly Rodrigues	Brazil	–	o	o	xo	o	xxx						1.76	
4	Courtney Campbell	Puerto Rico	–	–	o	xxo	xxx							1.73	
5	Olivia García	Chile	–	o	o	xxx								1.70	
5	Gabriela de Sá	Brazil	o	o	o	xxx								1.70	
7	Ana Isabela González	El Salvador	o	o	xxo	xxx								1.70	
8	Silvina Gil	Uruguay	o	o	xxx									1.65	

=== Pole vault ===
December 2

Rank	Name	Nationality	3.20	3.35	3.50	3.60	3.70	3.80	3.90	4.00	4.10	4.20	4.30	Result	Notes
1st place, gold medalist(s)	Isabel de Quadros	Brazil	–	–	–	–	–	–	–	o	o	xo	xxx	4.20	
2nd place, silver medalist(s)	Javiera Contreras	Chile	–	–	o	–	o	xo	o	xxx				3.90	
3rd place, bronze medalist(s)	Karen Bedoya	Colombia	–	–	o	o	o	xxo	xo	xxx				3.90	
4	Silvia Guerrero	Mexico	–	–	–	xxo	xxo	xo	xxo	xxx				3.90	
5	Aída Cruz	Mexico	–	–	–	–	xo	o	xxx					3.80	
6	Luciana Gómez	Argentina	–	–	xo	–	o	xo	xxx					3.80	
7	Rosaidi Robles	Cuba	–	–	o	o	o	xxo	xxx					3.80	
8	Antonia Crestani	Chile	–	–	xo	–	xo	xxx						3.70	
9	Luna Nazarit	Colombia	–	–	–	o	–	xxx						3.60	
9	Aldana Garibaldi	Argentina	–	o	o	o	xxx							3.60	
11	Sophia Salvi	Brazil	–	–	–	xo	xxx							3.60	
12	Arantxa Cortez	Peru	o	xo	xxx									3.35	
12	Nicole Rangel	Venezuela	–	xo	xxx									3.35	
14	Iraynelli Bravo	Venezuela	o	xxx										3.20	

=== Long jump ===
November 30

Rank	Name	Nationality	#1	#2	#3	#4	#5	#6	Result	Notes
1st place, gold medalist(s)	Paola Fernández	Puerto Rico	6.02	5.85	6.33	5.87	6.18		6.33	
2nd place, silver medalist(s)	Natalia Linares	Colombia	5.84	5.95	3.80	5.31	5.84	6.27	6.27	
3rd place, bronze medalist(s)	Thaina Fernandes	Brazil	5.92	x	6.19	6.25	x	6.07	6.25	
4	Lissandra Campos	Brazil	6.21	5.86	5.89	6.20	6.17	5.99	6.21	
5	Chantoba Bright	Guyana	6.11	6.20	x	5.62	6.05	5.94	6.20	
6	Rocío Muñoz	Chile	x	5.67	5.76	5.84	5.99	6.16	6.16	
7	María Trinidad Hurtado	Chile	6.02	5.89	x	5.56	5.75	6.03	6.03	
8	Yanisley Carrión	Cuba	6.01	x	5.99	5.77	x	x	6.01	
9	Nerli Cantoñi	Colombia	5.51	5.68	5.22				5.68	
10	Thaynara Zoch	Bolivia	5.52	5.30	5.53				5.53	

=== Triple jump ===
December 3

Rank	Name	Nationality	#1	#2	#3	#4	#5	#6	Result	Notes
1st place, gold medalist(s)	Leyanis Pérez	Cuba	14.22	14.23	14.39	14.34	–	14.12	14.39	
2nd place, silver medalist(s)	Chantoba Bright	Guyana	12.88	13.50	13.43	13.12	x	12.86	13.50	
3rd place, bronze medalist(s)	Leidy Cuesta	Colombia	13.08	13.24	12.69	–	–	–	13.24	
4	Nerisnelia Sousa	Brazil	13.04	13.10	x	x	12.83	13.16	13.16	
5	Fernanda Maita	Venezuela	12.80	12.53	12.95	13.09	x	12.30	13.09	
6	Estrella Lobo	Colombia	12.70	x	12.75	12.83	13.05	12.88	13.05	
7	Ana Paula Arguello	Paraguay	x	12.57	13.04	12.59	13.03	12.46	13.04	
8	Mairy Pires	Venezuela	12.94	12.68	12.35	12.53	x	12.27	12.94	
9	Paloma Cardoso	Brazil	x	12.11	12.46				12.46	
10	Joaquina Dura	Argentina	12.37	12.09	12.01				12.37	
11	Luciana Gennari	Argentina	x	x	11.89				11.89	

=== Shot put ===
December 3

Rank	Name	Nationality	#1	#2	#3	#4	#5	#6	Result	Notes
1st place, gold medalist(s)	Rosa Ramírez	Dominican Republic	16.17	16.04	x	15.40	17.39	17.45	17.45	
2nd place, silver medalist(s)	Ana Caroline Silva	Brazil	15.50	16.86	16.05	15.67	x	15.91	16.86	
3rd place, bronze medalist(s)	Milena Sens	Brazil	x	15.38	16.50	16.40	x	16.76	16.76	
4	Layselys Jiménez	Cuba	15.13	15.08	x	x	15.76	15.48	15.76	
5	Kelsie Murrel-Ross	Grenada	15.39	13.25	11.87	13.15	13.61	13.40	15.39	
6	Treneese Hamilton	Dominica	13.11	13.82	14.73	x	12.76	x	14.73	
7	Deisheline Mayers	Costa Rica	x	14.13	13.01	x	14.44	x	14.44	
8	Lorna Zurita	Ecuador	13.86	x	13.70	13.24	13.80	x	13.86	
9	Yosiris Córdoba	Colombia	13.32	x	x				13.32	
10	Ianna Roach	Trinidad and Tobago	x	12.96	x				12.96	
11	Javiera Bravo	Chile	12.04	12.84	12.35				12.84	
12	Samantha Morillo	Dominican Republic	x	11.62	11.70				11.70	

=== Discus throw ===
November 30

Rank	Name	Nationality	#1	#2	#3	#4	#5	#6	Result	Notes
1st place, gold medalist(s)	Silinda Morales	Cuba	59.13	52.88	54.16	54.03	55.86	54.11	59.13	
2nd place, silver medalist(s)	Melany Matheus	Cuba	x	53.40	x	54.31	x	52.89	54.31	
3rd place, bronze medalist(s)	Catalina Bravo	Chile	52.44	x	50.94	x	50.35	x	52.44	
4	Yosiris Córdoba	Colombia	x	51.57	x	x	x	45.29	51.57	
5	Lacee Barnes	Cayman Islands	45.80	51.00	x	x	x	46.55	51.00	
6	Merari Herrera	Ecuador	50.80	49.93	x	49.74	x	x	50.80	
7	Valquiria Meurer	Brazil	49.71	48.41	45.58	x	47.48	x	49.71	
8	Veronica Luzanilla	Mexico	47.14	x	47.35	x	45.54	45.72	47.35	
9	Ingrid Martins	Brazil	x	46.37	x				46.37	
10	Sofía Mojica	Mexico	41.94	43.04	39.65				43.04	
11	Kelsie Murrel-Ross	Grenada	35.42	17.06	30.74				35.42	
	Rosa Ramírez	Dominican Republic	x	x	x				NM	

=== Hammer throw ===
December 4

Rank	Name	Nationality	#1	#2	#3	#4	#5	#6	Result	Notes
1st place, gold medalist(s)	Yaritza Martínez	Cuba	66.22	67.47	x	65.25	66.13	63.44	67.47	
2nd place, silver medalist(s)	Silenis Vargas	Venezuela	61.18	65.63	x	63.15	60.06	x	65.63	
3rd place, bronze medalist(s)	Mariana García	Chile	63.27	63.90	62.78	64.76	64.24	64.86	64.86	
4	Liz Arleen Collía	Cuba	x	61.70	61.16	64.34	63.50	x	64.34	
5	Carolina Ulloa	Colombia	58.07	x	62.05	x	x	x	62.05	
6	Ximena Zorrilla	Peru	x	x	61.41	x	61.39	x	61.41	
7	Paola Bueno	Mexico	56.86	58.41	57.51	x	57.92	57.77	58.41	
8	Nereida Santa Cruz	Ecuador	57.63	x	55.78	56.10	x	x	57.63	
9	Ludith Campos	Dominican Republic	50.35	57.43	51.06				57.43	
10	Antonella Creazzola	Venezuela	53.89	x	56.35				56.35	
11	Valentina Clavería	Chile	54.42	x	x				54.42	
	Ana Caroline Silva	Brazil	x	x	x				NM	

=== Javelin throw ===
December 3

Rank	Name	Nationality	#1	#2	#3	#4	#5	#6	Result	Notes
1st place, gold medalist(s)	Juleisy Angulo	Ecuador	x	58.26	x	52.67	x	54.05	58.26	
2nd place, silver medalist(s)	Yicelena Ballar	Cuba	54.64	54.27	56.50	57.14	52.71	53.89	57.14	
3rd place, bronze medalist(s)	Valentina Barrios	Colombia	51.46	42.89	x	47.62	45.47	47.82	51.46	
4	Deisiane Teixeira	Brazil	51.46	42.89	x	47.62	45.47	47.82	51.17	
5	Agustina Moraga	Argentina	42.81	x	43.30	45.07	46.42	44.30	46.42	
6	Ana María Soler	Puerto Rico	43.13	45.50	44.65	43.53	43.49	46.16	46.16	
7	Luceris Suárez	Colombia	45.57	43.12	x	42.63	46.12	45.61	46.12	
8	Xochitl Montoya	Mexico	x	42.38	42.86	40.11	42.87	36.43	42.87	
9	Bruna de Jesus	Brazil	42.24	x	40.28				42.24	
10	Esther Padilla	Honduras	41.91	40.44	34.79				41.91	

=== Heptathlon ===
December 1–2

The highest mark recorded in each event is highlighted in yellow

Rank	Athlete	Nationality	100m H	HJ	SP	200m	LJ	JT	800m	Points	Notes
1st place, gold medalist(s)	Marys Patterson	Cuba	13.78	1.71	11.41	25.08	5.77	43.34	2:23.73	5663	
2nd place, silver medalist(s)	Joniar Thomas	Grenada	13.83	1.68	10.07	24.33	6.34	42.55	2:46.93	5484	
3rd place, bronze medalist(s)	Sara Isabel García	Colombia	14.11	1.59	11.63	24.88	5.64	37.91	2:21.63	5391	
4	Naiuri Krein	Brazil	14.60	1.65	11.92	25.62	5.28	35.86	2:28.64	5112	
5	Zully Villegas	Mexico	14.90	1.56	10.77	25.68	5.36	38.57	2:28.22	4964	
6	Rocío Chaparro	Paraguay	14.85	1.50	10.42	27.10	5.47	34.83	2:36.46	4617	
7	Marienger Chirinos	Venezuela	15.03	1.56	10.50	26.38	5.44	26.73	2:41.93	4502	
8	Mariam Buenanueva	Argentina	15.26	1.50	10.58	26.49	5.06	34.35	2:44.73	4406	
9	Angie Barboza	Venezuela	14.93	1.50	11.72	26.96	4.70	38.04	2:51.81	4384	
10	Larissa Macena	Brazil	14.53	1.62	11.46	25.93	5.63	28.73	DNF	4283	

== Mixed results ==
=== 4 × 400 meters relay ===
December 4

Rank	Team	Competitors	Time	Notes
1st place, gold medalist(s)	Brazil	Chayenne da Silva (W), Douglas da Silva (M), João Henrique Cabral (M), Tiffani Marinho (W)	3:18.54	AU23R
2nd place, silver medalist(s)	Colombia	Angie Melisa Arévalo (W), Neider Abello (M), Neiker Abello (M), Valeria Cabezas (W)	3:23.79	
3rd place, bronze medalist(s)	Dominican Republic	Ángelo Féliz (M), Fiordaliza Cofil (W), Franquelo Pérez (M), Liranyi Alonso (W)	3:28.28	
4	Mexico	Gerardo Lomeli (M), Israel Tinajero (M), Valeria González (W), Verónica Ángel (W)	3:29.52	
	Ecuador	Alan Minda (M), Andreina Minda (W), Anahí Suárez (W), Steeven Salas (M)	DQ	
