= Jadyn Keeler =

Canadian long-distance runner (born 2003)

Personal information
- Nationality: Canada
- Born: 16 June 2003 (age 23)

Sport
- Sport: Athletics
- Events: Long distance running, Cross country running

Achievements and titles
- Personal bests: Half Marathon: 1:08:03 (Copenhagen 2026, NR); 10,000 m : 31:56.03 (Palo Alto 2026, U23 NR); 5,000 m :15:14.76 (Boston 2025, indoor U23 NR
Medal record
Women's athletics
Representing Canada
Junior Pan American Games
Gold medal – first place	2025 Asunción	10,000 m
Silver medal – second place	2025 Asunción	5000 m

Jadyn Keeler (born 16 June 2003) is a Canadian long-distance and cross country runner. She won the Canadian national title and set a new national record in the half marathon in 2026. She won the 10,000 metres at the 2025 Junior Pan American Games, and set Canadian under-23 records that year over 10,000 metres and 5000 metres indoors.

== Biography ==
From Barrie, Ontario, she attended Innisdale Secondary School. Keeler graduated from University of North Dakota in Spring 2026.

During here collegiate career, she achieved several school records and NCAA Championships appearances.

In February 2025, she ran an indoor personal best over 5000 metres of 15:28.29. She made her NCAA championships debut indoors the following month, where she placed tenth in the 5000 metres final.

In April at the Stanford Invitational in Palo Alto, California, Keeler set a new Canadian U23 record for the 10,000 metres, running 32:06.70 to break the mark set by Gracelyn Larkin in 2023. In June, she made her NCAA Outdoor Championships debut, and placed 16th in the 10,000 metres with a time of 32:59.12.

Keeler won the gold medal over 10,000 metres, and the silver medal over 5000 metres, at the 2025 Junior Pan American Games in Asunción, Paraguay. She won the 10,000 metres in a championship record time or 34:16.61, with a winning margin close to two minutes.

Competing for the University of North Dakota in cross country, Keeler was undefeated in her first three races of the 2025 NCAA season and was named NCAA Division I Women’s National Athlete of the Week in September 2025. She then placed fourth at the Midwest Regionals in Stillwater, Oklahoma, the best individual regional finish in the program history for the University of North Dakota. She placed 26th at the 2025 NCAA Cross Country Championship.

Keeler set a Canadian under-23 indoor national record over 5000 metres in December 2025, running 15:14.76 in Boston, Massachusetts, to break the previous mark set by Chloe Thomas. In February, Keeler competed at the BU Valentine over 3000 metres, running below nine-minutes for the first time and setting a 27–second personal best with 8:50.45. In the penultimate NCAA indoor track meeting of her eligibility, Keeler won a hat trick of titles, winning the mile run, 3000m and 5000m at the 2026 Summit League Indoor Championships in Grand Forks, and was named MVP of the meet. She placed twelfth in the 5000 m in 15:40.81 on 13 March at the 2026 NCAA Indoor Championships. That year, having broken five University of North Dakota records, she placed third at the NCAA West Regionals in the 10,000m in 32:11.14, finishing behind Jane Hedengren and Pamela Kosgei, and qualified in both the 5,000m and 10,000m for the 2026 NCAA Outdoor Championships. In the 10,000 metres final, Keeler ran 32:04.97 for sixth place.

Post collegiate career : after graduating from University of North Dakota, she joined the golden peaks tc training group in Flagstaff Arizona and secured a deal with running brand Adidas and sports fueling company Blanks sports Nutrition.

Right after her last NCAA season, Keeler finished runner-up to Gabriela Debues-Stafford over 5000 metres at the Canadian Championships. In August, she won the Canadian Half Marathon Championships in Edmonton, despite a measurement error that added nearly 700 metres to the stated distance. On 20 September, she set a new Canadian national record in the half marathon at the 2026 World Athletics Road Running Championships in Copenhagen, running 1:08:03 to finish 16th in the race, breaking the previous record set in 2020 by 95 seconds.
