= Jehlani Gordon =

Jamaican athlete (born 2003)

Personal information
- Nationality: Jamaican
- Born: 1 December 2003 (age 22)

Sport
- Sport: Athletics
- Event: Sprint
- College team: Georgia Bulldogs

Achievements and titles
- Personal best(s): 60m: 6.60 (Clemson, 2024); 100m: 10.05 (Lexington, 2024); 200m: 20.93 (Kingston, 2023)
Medal record
Men's athletics
Representing Jamaica
Junior Pan American Games
Silver medal – second place	2025 Asunción	4×100 m relay
NACAC U23 Championships
Gold medal – first place	2023 San Jose	4×100 m relay

Jehlani Gordon (born 1 December 2003) is a Jamaican sprinter.

== Early life ==
He attended Wolmer's Schools in Kingston, Jamaica.

== Career ==
He won a gold medal with the Jamaican 4 × 100 m relay team at the 2023 NACAC U23 Championships.

He ran a personal best 6.60 seconds for the 60 metres at the Clemson Invitational in January 2024. He ran a personal best of 10.05 seconds for the 100 metres in Lexington, Kentucky in May 2024.

He finished sixth at the Jamaican Olympic trials in Kingston, Jamaica in June 2024. He competed in the men's 4 x 100 metres relay at the 2024 Paris Olympics.

== Personal life ==
He attends the University of Georgia.
