= Avery Pearson =

Canadian middle-distance runner (born 2003)

Personal information
- Born: 24 May 2003 (age 23)

Sport
- Sport: Athletics
- Event: Middle-distance running

Achievements and titles
- Personal best(s): 800m: 2:00.76 (Boulder, 2026)
Medal record
Women's athletics
Representing Canada
Junior Pan American Games
Gold medal – first place	2025 Asunción	4×400 m relay
Silver medal – second place	2025 Asunción	800 m

Avery Pearson (born 24 May 2003) is a Canadian middle-distance runner.

== Biography ==
From Meadow Lake, Saskatchewan, she studied Kinesiology at University of Saskatchewan and the University of Colorado in the United States.

Pearson had a seventh place finish in the 800 metres at the 2021 World Athletics U20 Championships in Nairobi, Kenya. In 2023, Pearson set a 600m personal best of 1:28.83 at the 2023 U Sports Indoor Championships as she finished second overall. While competing for the Saskatchewan Huskies the following year, Pearson won the U Sports title in Manitoba over 1000 metres indoors in March 2024, and also anchored her school's 4x400m and 4x800m teams to national titles, while also being runner-up over 600 metres.

At the University of Alberta Golden Bear Open on 20 January 2025, Pearson opened her indoor season with a win in the women’s 600m in a time of 1:30.25 to set a new meeting record. Pearson ran 2:03.17 for the 800 metres at the Portland Track Festival in June 2025, and placed third in 2:03.18 over 800 metre at the senior Canadian Athletics Championships in Ottawa in August 2025. She was a silver medalist over 800 metres at the Athletics at the 2025 Junior Pan American Games in Asunción, Paraguay. She also won the gold medal in the women's 4 x 400 metres with the team of Pearson, Isabella Goudros, Emily Martin and Dianna Proctor setting a new Junior Pan Am Games record time of 3:31.73.

Pearson set an indoor personal best for the 800 metres of 2:00.76 to move to sixth on the Canadian indoor all-time list and third on the NCAA indoor list for the 800m at altitude, in February 2026. The following week, while competing at the Big 12 Indoor Championships in Texas, Pearson won the not-often ran distance of 600 years (~548m), breaking the meet record in the preliminary round with 1:17.92, before lowering it again in the final, winning in 1:17.48. She was selected for the 2026 World Athletics Indoor Championships in Toruń, Poland, without advancing to the semi-finals of the 800 metres. In June, competing for the University of Colorado, she qualified for the 2026 NCAA Outdoor Championships having lowered her personal best to 2:00.76 that year.
