= Athletics at the 2025 Junior Pan American Games – Results =

These are the official results of the athletics competition at the 2025 Junior Pan American Games which took place between 18 and 22 August 2025, at the Parque Olímpico in Luque, Asunción, Paraguay.

== Men's results ==
=== 100 metres ===
Heats – 18 August
Wind:
Heat 1: +0.5 m/s, Heat 2: +0.5 m/s, Heat 3: +0.4 m/s

| Rank | Heat | Name | Nationality | Time | Notes |
|---|---|---|---|---|---|
| 1 | 2 | Davonte Howell | Cayman Islands | 10.10 | Q, GR |
| 2 | 1 | Ronal Longa | Colombia | 10.13 | Q |
| 3 | 3 | Eloy Benitez | Puerto Rico | 10.15 | Q |
| 4 | 3 | Carlos Flórez | Colombia | 10.16 | Q |
| 5 | 2 | Reynaldo Espinosa | Cuba | 10.17 | Q |
| 6 | 1 | Jehlani Gordon | Jamaica | 10.21 | Q |
| 7 | 3 | Jaleel Croal | British Virgin Islands | 10.22 | q |
| 8 | 1 | Ajani Daley | Antigua and Barbuda | 10.33 | q |
| 9 | 1 | Tomás Villegas | Argentina | 10.34 | |
| 10 | 1 | Diego González | Puerto Rico | 10.44 | |
| 11 | 2 | Gustavo Mongelos | Paraguay | 10.48 | |
| 12 | 2 | Matheus de Oliveira | Brazil | 10.52 | |
| 13 | 2 | Wanyae Belle | British Virgin Islands | 10.72 | |
| 14 | 3 | Kyle Lawrence | Saint Vincent and the Grenadines | 10.73 | |
| 15 | 3 | D'Angelo Huisden | Suriname | 10.88 | |
| 16 | 1 | Brandon Pemberton | Virgin Islands | 10.96 | |
| 17 | 2 | Yassir Cruz | Honduras | 11.38 | |
| | 3 | Bouwahjgie Nkrumie | Jamaica | DQ | |

Final – 19 August

Wind: +1.9 m/s

| Rank | Lane | Name | Nationality | Time | Notes |
|---|---|---|---|---|---|
| 1st place, gold medalist(s) | 5 | Davonte Howell | Cayman Islands | 9.98 | GR |
| 2nd place, silver medalist(s) | 4 | Ronal Longa | Colombia | 10.07 | |
| 3rd place, bronze medalist(s) | 8 | Jaleel Croal | British Virgin Islands | 10.16 | |
| 4 | 2 | Jehlani Gordon | Jamaica | 10.18 | |
| 5 | 3 | Eloy Benitez | Puerto Rico | 10.20 | |
| 6 | 7 | Reynaldo Espinosa | Cuba | 10.21 | |
| 7 | 6 | Carlos Flórez | Colombia | 10.29 | |
| 8 | 1 | Ajani Daley | Antigua and Barbuda | 10.31 | |

=== 200 metres ===
Heats – 20 August
Wind:
Heat 1: 0.0 m/s, Heat 2: 0.0 m/s

| Rank | Heat | Name | Nationality | Time | Notes |
|---|---|---|---|---|---|
| 1 | 1 | Jaiden Reid | Cayman Islands | 20.56 | Q |
| 2 | 1 | Ronal Longa | Colombia | 20.71 | Q |
| 3 | 2 | José Figueroa | Puerto Rico | 20.80 | Q |
| 4 | 2 | Jaleel Croal | British Virgin Islands | 21.03 | Q |
| 5 | 1 | Wanyae Belle | British Virgin Islands | 21.08 | Q |
| 6 | 1 | Sanjay Seymore | Jamaica | 21.13 | q |
| 7 | 2 | Aragorn Straker | Barbados | 21.14 | Q |
| 8 | 2 | Odaine Crooks | Jamaica | 21.18 | q |
| 9 | 2 | Jhumiler Sánchez | Paraguay | 21.22 | |
| 10 | 1 | Renan Gallina | Brazil | 21.23 | |
| 11 | 2 | Óscar Baltán | Colombia | 21.32 | |
| 12 | 1 | Shamar Horatio | Guyana | 21.35 | |
| 13 | 1 | Yassir Cruz | Honduras | 23.85 | |

Final – 21 August

Wind: +0.3 m/s

| Rank | Lane | Name | Nationality | Time | Notes |
|---|---|---|---|---|---|
| 1st place, gold medalist(s) | 7 | José Figueroa | Puerto Rico | 20.16 | GR, NR |
| 2nd place, silver medalist(s) | 3 | Jaleel Croal | British Virgin Islands | 20.39 | |
| 3rd place, bronze medalist(s) | 5 | Ronal Longa | Colombia | 20.51 | PB |
| 4 | 6 | Jaiden Reid | Cayman Islands | 20.52 | |
| 5 | 4 | Wanyae Belle | British Virgin Islands | 20.84 | |
| 6 | 1 | Odaine Crooks | Jamaica | 21.02 | |
| 7 | 2 | Sanjay Seymore | Jamaica | 21.07 | |
| | 8 | Aragorn Straker | Barbados | DNS | |

=== 400 metres ===
Heats – 19 August

| Rank | Heat | Name | Nationality | Time | Notes |
|---|---|---|---|---|---|
| 1 | 1 | Jasauna Dennis | Jamaica | 45.73 | Q |
| 2 | 1 | Shakeem McKay | Trinidad and Tobago | 45.98 | Q |
| 3 | 2 | Jaden Marchan | Trinidad and Tobago | 46.26 | Q |
| 4 | 1 | Vinícius Galeno | Brazil | 46.44 | Q |
| 4 | 2 | Shaemar Uter | Jamaica | 46.44 | Q |
| 6 | 2 | Malachi Austin | Guyana | 46.69 | Q |
| 7 | 2 | Jadson de Lima | Brazil | 46.93 | q |
| 8 | 1 | Ross Walrond | Barbados | 46.99 | q |
| 9 | 2 | Alejandro Rosado | Puerto Rico | 47.06 | |
| 10 | 2 | Zion Miller | Bahamas | 47.60 | |
| 11 | 1 | Rafael Buelna | Mexico | 49.02 | |
| 12 | 1 | Paul Wood | Paraguay | 49.65 | |

Final – 20 August

| Rank | Lane | Name | Nationality | Time | Notes |
|---|---|---|---|---|---|
| 1st place, gold medalist(s) | 4 | Jasauna Dennis | Jamaica | 45.56 | GR |
| 2nd place, silver medalist(s) | 5 | Jaden Marchan | Trinidad and Tobago | 45.80 | |
| 3rd place, bronze medalist(s) | 8 | Vinícius Galeno | Brazil | 45.83 | |
| 4 | 7 | Shakeem McKay | Trinidad and Tobago | 45.87 | |
| 5 | 6 | Shaemar Uter | Jamaica | 46.13 | |
| 6 | 1 | Jadson de Lima | Brazil | 46.50 | |
| 7 | 3 | Malachi Austin | Guyana | 46.67 | |
| 8 | 2 | Ross Walrond | Barbados | 47.20 | |

=== 800 metres ===
Heats – 20 August

| Rank | Heat | Name | Nationality | Time | Notes |
|---|---|---|---|---|---|
| 1 | 2 | Miguel Pantojas | Puerto Rico | 1:49.79 | Q, .784 |
| 2 | 2 | Jânio Varjão | Brazil | 1:49.79 | Q, .787 |
| 3 | 2 | Klaus Scholz | Chile | 1:49.89 | Q |
| 3 | 1 | John O'Reilly | Canada | 1:50.81 | Q |
| 4 | 1 | Amado Amador | Mexico | 1:51.18 | Q |
| 5 | 1 | Marco Gonçalves | Brazil | 1:51.41 | Q |
| 6 | 2 | Nirobi Smith-Mills | Bermuda | 1:51.82 | q |
| 7 | 1 | Lucas Jara | Chile | 1:52.32 | q |
| 8 | 2 | José Manuel Rodríguez | Mexico | 1:53.27 | |
| 9 | 1 | Cristián Acosta | Paraguay | 1:54.07 | |
| 10 | 1 | Shavan Jarrett | Jamaica | 1:54.89 | |
| | 1 | Freddy Rojas | Venezuela | DQ | TR17.1.2[O] |
| | 2 | Dylan DeCambre | Jamaica | DQ | TR17.2.3 |
| | 2 | Shamiso Sikaneta | Canada | DQ | TR17.1.2[O] |
| | 2 | Uriel Muñoz | Argentina | DNF | |

Final – 22 August

| Rank | Name | Nationality | Time | Notes |
|---|---|---|---|---|
| 1st place, gold medalist(s) | Miguel Pantojas | Puerto Rico | 1:48.79 | GR |
| 2nd place, silver medalist(s) | John O'Reilly | Canada | 1:49.12 | |
| 3rd place, bronze medalist(s) | Amado Amador | Mexico | 1:49.14 | |
| 4 | Marco Gonçalves | Brazil | 1:49.29 | |
| 5 | Nirobi Smith-Mills | Bermuda | 1:50.00 | |
| 6 | Lucas Jara | Chile | 1:51.11 | |
| 7 | Klaus Scholz | Chile | 1:51.27 | |
| 8 | Jânio Varjão | Brazil | 2:03.04 | |

=== 1500 metres ===
21 August

| Rank | Name | Nationality | Time | Notes |
|---|---|---|---|---|
| 1st place, gold medalist(s) | Jude Wheeler-Dee | Canada | 3:45.08 | |
| 2nd place, silver medalist(s) | Émile Toupin | Canada | 3:45.29 | |
| 3rd place, bronze medalist(s) | Uriel Muñoz | Argentina | 3:45.97 | |
| 4 | Iker Sánchez | Mexico | 3:46.36 | |
| 5 | Ricardo Amador | Mexico | 3:49.55 | |
| 6 | Edwin Santos | Puerto Rico | 3:50.53 | |
| 7 | Brayan Jara | Chile | 3:50.66 | |
| 8 | Gonzalo Gervasini | Uruguay | 3:50.82 | |
| 9 | Jânio Varjäo | Brazil | 3:52.98 | |
| 10 | Ericky Dos Santos | Paraguay | 3:53.72 | |
| 11 | Asher Patel | Aruba | 3:54.68 | |

=== 5000 metres ===
18 August

| Rank | Name | Nationality | Time | Notes |
|---|---|---|---|---|
| 1st place, gold medalist(s) | Pedro Marín | Colombia | 14:11.50 | GR |
| 2nd place, silver medalist(s) | Iker Sánchez | Mexico | 14:13.14 | |
| 3rd place, bronze medalist(s) | Ian Sánchez | Mexico | 14:14.42 | |
| 4 | Jânio Varjäo | Brazil | 14:32.13 | |
| 5 | Jhonatan Molina | Peru | 14:36.07 | |
| 6 | Vinícius Alves | Brazil | 14:40.32 | |
| 7 | David Ninavia | Bolivia | 14:44.93 | |
| 8 | Ericky Dos Santos | Paraguay | 15:57.95 | |
| | Gonzalo Gervasini | Uruguay | DNF | |
| | Nider Pecho | Peru | DNS | |

=== 10,000 metres ===
21 August

| Rank | Name | Nationality | Time | Notes |
|---|---|---|---|---|
| 1st place, gold medalist(s) | Pedro Marín | Colombia | 30:57.8 | |
| 2nd place, silver medalist(s) | David Ninavia | Bolivia | 31:03.2 | |
| 3rd place, bronze medalist(s) | Nider Pecho | Peru | 31:06.2 | |
| 4 | Esteban Ortega | Colombia | 31:19.2 | |
| 5 | Miguel Ángel López | Mexico | 31:37.2 | |
| 6 | Ignacio Carrizo | Chile | 31:37.7 | |
| 7 | Elier Martínez | Cuba | 31:52.3 | |
| 8 | Martín Moleker | Argentina | 32:11.0 | |
| 9 | Agustín Lima | Uruguay | 32:47.7 | |
| | Axel Arceaga | Mexico | DNF | |
| | Matías Ubeda | Chile | DNF | |
| | Jhonatan Molina | Peru | DNF | |

=== 110 metres hurdles ===
Heats – 21 August
Wind:
Heat 1: +0.5 m/s, Heat 2: +0.8 m/s

| Rank | Heat | Name | Nationality | Time | Notes |
|---|---|---|---|---|---|
| 1 | 2 | Yander Herrera | Cuba | 13.54 | Q, GR |
| 2 | 1 | Thiago Ornelas | Brazil | 13.77 | Q |
| 3 | 1 | Matthew Sullivan | Jamaica | 13.87 | Q |
| 4 | 2 | Isaiah Patrick | Grenada | 13.92 | Q |
| 5 | 2 | José Eduardo da Silva | Brazil | 13.99 | Q |
| 6 | 1 | Deivy Rodríguez | Cuba | 14.14 | Q |
| 7 | 2 | David Warmington | Jamaica | 14.21 | q |
| 8 | 1 | Michael Scherk | Canada | 14.26 | q |
| 9 | 2 | Emilio Alonso | Chile | 14.33 | |
| 10 | 2 | Kevin Mendieta | Paraguay | 14.34 | |
| 11 | 1 | Luis Orta | Puerto Rico | 14.55 | |
| 12 | 1 | Dicarlo Angulo | Mexico | 15.68 | |
| 13 | 2 | Alberto Sandoval | Nicaragua | 16.35 | |
| 14 | 1 | Nikkolai Kennedy | Barbados | 36.66 | |

Final – 22 August

Wind: +1.7 m/s

| Rank | Lane | Name | Nationality | Time | Notes |
|---|---|---|---|---|---|
| 1st place, gold medalist(s) | 6 | Yander Herrera | Cuba | 13.60 | |
| 2nd place, silver medalist(s) | 4 | Thiago Ornelas | Brazil | 13.61 | |
| 3rd place, bronze medalist(s) | 5 | Isaiah Patrick | Grenada | 13.73 | |
| 4 | 7 | José Eduardo da Silva | Brazil | 13.84 | |
| 5 | 8 | David Warmington | Jamaica | 13.98 | |
| 6 | 1 | Michael Scherk | Canada | 14.07 | |
| 7 | 2 | Deivy Rodríguez | Cuba | 14.22 | |
| 8 | 3 | Matthew Sullivan | Jamaica | 15.11 | |

=== 400 metres hurdles ===
Heats – 18 August

| Rank | Heat | Name | Nationality | Time | Notes |
|---|---|---|---|---|---|
| 1 | 1 | Matheus Lima | Brazil | 48.23 | Q, GR |
| 2 | 1 | Tyrece Hyman | Jamaica | 49.03 | Q |
| 3 | 1 | Yeral Núñez | Dominican Republic | 49.75 | Q |
| 4 | 1 | Bruno De Genaro | Argentina | 50.61 | q |
| 5 | 2 | Yan Vázquez | Puerto Rico | 50.60 | Q |
| 6 | 2 | Ramón Fuenzalida | Chile | 50.76 | Q |
| 7 | 2 | Romario Stewart | Jamaica | 50.84 | Q |
| 8 | 1 | Michael Olasio | Puerto Rico | 50.89 | q |
| 9 | 1 | José Eduardo Aguado | Mexico | 51.14 | |
| 10 | 2 | Maximiliano Núñez | Mexico | 51.24 | |
| 11 | 1 | Pierre Castillo | Cuba | 51.78 | |
| 12 | 2 | Caio Vinícius Silva | Brazil | 52.59 | |
| 13 | 1 | Akanye Samuel | Saint Kitts and Nevis | 53.38 | |
| 14 | 2 | Iván Eduardo Britez | Paraguay | 56.14 | |
| 15 | 2 | Dillon Leacock | Trinidad and Tobago | 58.57 | |

Final – 20 August

| Rank | Lane | Name | Nationality | Time | Notes |
|---|---|---|---|---|---|
| 1st place, gold medalist(s) | 4 | Tyrece Hyman | Jamaica | 48.90 | |
| 2nd place, silver medalist(s) | 6 | Matheus Lima | Brazil | 49.28 | |
| 3rd place, bronze medalist(s) | 8 | Romario Stewart | Jamaica | 50.11 | |
| 4 | 3 | Yeral Núñez | Dominican Republic | 50.13 | |
| 5 | 5 | Yan Vázquez | Puerto Rico | 50.39 | |
| 6 | 1 | Bruno De Genaro | Argentina | 50.65 | |
| 7 | 7 | Ramón Fuenzalida | Chile | 51.23 | |
| 8 | 2 | Michael Olasio | Puerto Rico | 52.40 | |

=== 3000 metres steeplechase ===
22 August

| Rank | Name | Nationality | Time | Notes |
|---|---|---|---|---|
| 1st place, gold medalist(s) | Oleisy Ferrer | Cuba | 8:54.20 | |
| 2nd place, silver medalist(s) | Mateus de Alencar | Brazil | 8:57.82 | |
| 3rd place, bronze medalist(s) | Roberto Márquez | Mexico | 9:02.34 | |
| 4 | Vinícius Alves | Brazil | 9:06.36 | |
| 5 | Paulo Gómez | Costa Rica | 9:09.61 | |
| 6 | Salvador Lucero | Argentina | 9:14.66 | |
| 7 | Leonardo Guerrero | Argentina | 9:23.63 | |
| 8 | Diego Caldeira | Venezuela | 9:24.17 | |
| 9 | Alejandro Hernández | Mexico | 9:25.26 | |
| 10 | José Antonio Moreno | Venezuela | 9:34.98 | |
| 11 | Yeferson Cuno | Peru | 9:46.70 | |
| 12 | Julio Espinoza | Chile | 10:21.24 | |
| | Rusbel Pacheco | Peru | DQ | TR23.7 |

=== 4 × 100 metres relay ===
21 August

| Rank | Lane | Team | Competitors | Time | Notes |
|---|---|---|---|---|---|
| 1st place, gold medalist(s) | 4 | Colombia | Carlos Flórez, Enoc Moreno, Óscar Baltán, Ronal Longa | 38.99 | GR, AU23R |
| 2nd place, silver medalist(s) | 8 | Jamaica | Requelme Reid, Jehlani Gordon, Odaine Crooks, Bouwahjgie Nkrumie | 39.21 | |
| 3rd place, bronze medalist(s) | 6 | Argentina | Juan Agustín Sagasta, Lucas Villegas, Tomás Villegas, Tomás Mondino | 39.45 | NR |
| 4 | 5 | Cuba | Georvis Domínguez, Reynaldo Espinosa, Deivy Rodríguez, Yander Herrera | 39.50 | |
| 5 | 7 | Brazil | Thamer Villar, Matheus de Oliveira, Lucas Rocha, Renan Gallina | 39.76 | |
| 6 | 3 | Paraguay | Anhuar Duarte, Rodrigo Ortiz, Jhumiler Sánchez, Gustavo Mongelos | 40.00 | |

=== 4 × 400 metres relay ===
22 August

| Rank | Lane | Team | Competitors | Time | Notes |
|---|---|---|---|---|---|
| 1st place, gold medalist(s) | 6 | Brazil | Matheus Lima, Vinícius Galeno, Jadson de Lima, Elias dos Santos | 3:03.76 | GR |
| 2nd place, silver medalist(s) | 4 | Jamaica | Omary Robinson, Jasauna Dennis, Kevin Bliss, Tyrece Hyman | 3:06.59 | |
| 3rd place, bronze medalist(s) | 2 | Puerto Rico | José Figueroa, Alejandro Rosado, Jarell Cruz, Nataenel Vigo | 3:07.29 | |
| 4 | 1 | Trinidad and Tobago | Kyrell Thomas, Shakeem McKay, Dillon Leacock, Jaden Marchan | 3:08.55 | |
| 5 | 8 | Mexico | Abimelec Zamorano, Maximiliano Núñez, José Eduardo Aguado, Dario Rodríguez | 3:13.58 | |
| 6 | 7 | Cuba | Yohandris Bientz, Pierre Castillo, Josmi Sánchez, Oleisy Ferrer | 3:15.05 | |
| 7 | 3 | Paraguay | Iván Eduardo Britez, Cristián Acosta, Giuliano Ruffinelli, Paul Wood | 3:22.26 | |
| | 5 | Guyana | Malachi Austin, Simeon Adams, Afi Blair, Kaidon Persaud | DNF | |

=== 20,000 metres race walk ===
19 August

| Rank | Name | Nationality | Time | Penalties | Notes |
|---|---|---|---|---|---|
| 1st place, gold medalist(s) | Miguel Peña | Colombia | 1:23:06.10 | ~ | |
| 2nd place, silver medalist(s) | Saul Wamputsrik | Ecuador | 1:23:51.38 | > | |
| 3rd place, bronze medalist(s) | Brandon Pérez | Mexico | 1:24:48.51 | | |
| 4 | Jaime Ccanto | Peru | 1:28:17.37 | ~~~ | |
| 5 | Jhon Chamba | Ecuador | 1:28:39.82 | ~~> | |
| 6 | Jhoshua Monterroso | Guatemala | 1:28:51.19 | | |
| 7 | Hamilton Poou | Guatemala | 1:29:14.36 | > | |
| 8 | Edson de Aguiar | Brazil | 1:29:36.66 | > | |
| 8 | Emiliano Barba | Mexico | 1:31:08.18 | >~ | |
| | Miguel Ángel Quispe | Peru | DQ | >~~> | TR54.7.5 |
| | Mateo Romero | Colombia | DQ | >>>> | TR54.7.5 |

=== High jump ===
21 August

| Rank | Name | Nationality | 1.88 | 1.93 | 1.98 | 2.01 | 2.04 | 2.07 | 2.10 | Result | Notes |
|---|---|---|---|---|---|---|---|---|---|---|---|
| 1st place, gold medalist(s) | Diosber Hernández | Cuba | – | – | – | o | o | o | xxx | 2.07 | |
| 2nd place, silver medalist(s) | Santiago Barbería | Argentina | – | o | o | xo | o | o | xxx | 2.07 | |
| 3rd place, bronze medalist(s) | Jesús Vázquez | Mexico | – | o | xo | – | o | xxo | xxx | 2.07 | |
| 4 | Domingo Lorenzini | Chile | o | o | o | xo | o | xxx | | 2.04 | |
| 5 | Cristóbal Sahurie | Chile | – | o | xo | xo | o | xxx | | 2.04 | |
| 6 | Manuel Rodríguez | Cuba | – | – | o | xxo | xxx | | | 2.01 | |
| 7 | Jholeixon Rodríguez | Ecuador | o | o | xxx | | | | | 1.93 | |

=== Pole vault ===
22 August

| Rank | Name | Nationality | 4.40 | 4.60 | 4.80 | 4.90 | 5.00 | 5.10 | 5.20 | 5.25 | 5.30 | 5.45 | 5.61 | Result | Notes |
|---|---|---|---|---|---|---|---|---|---|---|---|---|---|---|---|
| 1st place, gold medalist(s) | Ricardo Montes de Oca | Venezuela | – | – | – | – | o | o | xxo | – | o | xxo | xxx | 5.45 | GR, NR, NU20R |
| 2nd place, silver medalist(s) | Andreas Kreiss | Brazil | – | o | o | xo | xxo | o | xx– | x | | | | 5.10 | |
| 3rd place, bronze medalist(s) | Agustín Carril | Argentina | – | – | xo | – | xo | xxx | | | | | | 5.00 | |
| 4 | Liván Torres | Cuba | – | – | xo | xxo | xxx | | | | | | | 4.90 | |
| 5 | Aurelio Leite | Brazil | – | o | xo | xxx | | | | | | | | 4.80 | |
| 6 | Josué García | Mexico | – | o | xxx | | | | | | | | | 4.60 | |
| 6 | Leonardo Olate | Chile | o | o | xx– | x | | | | | | | | 4.60 | |
| 8 | Ángel Hernández | Mexico | – | xxo | xxx | | | | | | | | | 4.60 | |
| | Diego Navas | Argentina | – | xxx | | | | | | | | | | NM | |

=== Long jump ===
19 August

| Rank | Name | Nationality | #1 | #2 | #3 | #4 | #5 | #6 | Result | Notes |
|---|---|---|---|---|---|---|---|---|---|---|
| 1st place, gold medalist(s) | Aniel Molina | Cuba | 7.62 | 7.95 | x | x | x | x | 7.95 | |
| 2nd place, silver medalist(s) | Jhon Valencia | Colombia | 7.08 | 7.27 | 7.18 | x | 7.20 | 7.39 | 7.39 | |
| 3rd place, bronze medalist(s) | Andrew Stone | Cayman Islands | 7.16 | x | 7.09 | 7.37 | 7.33 | 7.25 | 7.37 | |
| 4 | Khybah Dawson | British Virgin Islands | x | 6.99 | 7.07 | x | 7.02 | 7.25 | 7.25 | |
| 5 | Jahiem Watson | Jamaica | x | x | 7.21 | x | 6.52 | x | 7.21 | |
| 6 | Teon Haynes | Barbados | 7.00 | 6.80 | 6.91 | 7.20 | 7.15 | 7.16 | 7.20 | |
| 7 | Ricoy Hunter | Jamaica | 7.03 | 7.15w | x | 7.15 | x | 7.01 | 7.15 | |
| 8 | Mattheus de Barros | Brazil | 7.01 | 6.88 | x | x | x | x | 7.01 | |
| 9 | Alexander Villalba | Paraguay | x | x | 6.91 | | | | 6.91 | |
| 10 | Miguel Aronátegui | Panama | 6.42 | 6.85 | 6.88 | | | | 6.88 | |
| 11 | Gabriel Boza | Brazil | 6.82 | x | x | | | | 6.82 | |
| | Elisha Williams | Grenada | – | x | – | | | | NM | |

=== Triple jump ===
22 August

| Rank | Name | Nationality | #1 | #2 | #3 | #4 | #5 | #6 | Result | Notes |
|---|---|---|---|---|---|---|---|---|---|---|
| 1st place, gold medalist(s) | Praise Aniamaka | Canada | 16.69w | 16.94 | 16.56w | – | – | – | 16.94 | GR |
| 2nd place, silver medalist(s) | Felipe Izidoro | Brazil | 16.74 | 16.48w | x | – | x | x | 16.74 | |
| 3rd place, bronze medalist(s) | Chavez Penn | Jamaica | 14.65w | x | 16.02w | 16.24w | 16.44 | 16.33w | 16.44 | |
| 4 | Anthony Martínez | Cuba | 15.71w | 16.18w | 16.11w | 15.38w | 16.29w | 15.88w | 16.29w | |
| 5 | Divine Aniamaka | Canada | 15.84w | 15.85 | 16.27w | 16.11 | 16.04w | 15.70 | 16.27w | |
| 6 | Stafon Roach | Guyana | 15.37w | x | 16.01w | 15.52w | x | x | 16.01w | |
| 7 | Nazareno Melgarejo | Argentina | 13.38w | 15.43w | 15.60w | 14.26w | 14.35 | 14.26w | 15.60w | |
| 8 | Antone Smith | Bahamas | 15.47 | x | x | 14.70w | x | x | 15.47 | |
| 9 | Jhon Valencia | Colombia | 15.07w | x | 15.34w | | | | 15.34w | |
| 10 | Karel López | Cuba | 15.04w | x | 15.21w | | | | 15.21w | |

=== Shot put ===
19 August

| Rank | Name | Nationality | #1 | #2 | #3 | #4 | #5 | #6 | Result | Notes |
|---|---|---|---|---|---|---|---|---|---|---|
| 1st place, gold medalist(s) | Juan Manuel Arrieguez | Argentina | 17.69 | 18.06 | 18.36 | 18.32 | x | 18.39 | 18.39 | |
| 2nd place, silver medalist(s) | Vinícius Avancini | Brazil | 17.68 | 17.56 | 18.31 | 17.08 | 17.00 | 18.14 | 18.31 | |
| 3rd place, bronze medalist(s) | Alessandro Borges | Brazil | 17.71 | 17.93 | 17.85 | 17.97 | 17.83 | x | 17.97 | |
| 4 | Shaiquan Dunn | Jamaica | 17.03 | x | 17.38 | 17.84 | x | x | 17.84 | |
| 5 | Christopher Young | Jamaica | 17.75 | x | 17.56 | x | 17.79 | x | 17.79 | |
| 6 | Emmanuel Ramírez | Cuba | 17.33 | 17.73 | x | 16.71 | 17.16 | 17.65 | 17.73 | |
| 7 | Jesús Guzmán | Mexico | 16.19 | x | 16.30 | 16.04 | 17.08 | 16.82 | 17.08 | |
| 8 | Alan Cabanellas | Puerto Rico | 16.12 | 16.94 | x | x | 17.04 | x | 17.04 | |
| 9 | Guillermo López | Mexico | 15.39 | 16.09 | x | | | | 16.09 | |
| | Jaylon Calder | Grenada | x | – | – | | | | NM | |

=== Discus throw ===
22 August

| Rank | Name | Nationality | #1 | #2 | #3 | #4 | #5 | #6 | Result | Notes |
|---|---|---|---|---|---|---|---|---|---|---|
| 1st place, gold medalist(s) | Racquil Broderick | Jamaica | 59.03 | 61.79 | 60.06 | 61.53 | 60.33 | 61.61 | 61.79 | |
| 2nd place, silver medalist(s) | Christopher Young | Jamaica | 56.24 | x | 55.26 | 55.59 | 59.34 | x | 59.34 | |
| 3rd place, bronze medalist(s) | Mateus Torres | Brazil | 54.65 | 58.41 | 56.38 | 58.64 | 58.73 | x | 58.73 | |
| 4 | Juan David Montaño | Colombia | 47.88 | 55.69 | 55.70 | x | 52.46 | x | 55.70 | |
| 5 | Jesús Magaña | Mexico | 50.28 | 53.61 | x | 53.99 | x | 55.02 | 55.02 | |
| 6 | Jaden James | Trinidad and Tobago | 54.13 | 53.56 | 53.40 | x | 53.28 | 52.57 | 54.13 | |
| 7 | Nathan Villegas | Puerto Rico | 51.85 | x | 53.97 | x | 51.61 | x | 53.97 | |
| 8 | Alberto dos Santos | Brazil | x | x | 52.12 | 52.53 | x | 50.36 | 52.53 | |
| 9 | Jesús Guzmán | Mexico | x | 51.42 | x | | | | 51.42 | |
| 10 | Tomás Pacheco | Argentina | 44.57 | 50.57 | 48.02 | | | | 50.57 | |
| 11 | Camilo Rojas | Chile | x | 49.20 | 48.25 | | | | 49.20 | |
| 12 | Jeims Molina | Costa Rica | 46.71 | x | 45.74 | | | | 46.71 | |

=== Hammer throw ===
20 August

| Rank | Name | Nationality | #1 | #2 | #3 | #4 | #5 | #6 | Result | Notes |
|---|---|---|---|---|---|---|---|---|---|---|
| 1st place, gold medalist(s) | Tomás Olivera | Argentina | x | 70.61 | x | x | x | x | 70.61 | |
| 2nd place, silver medalist(s) | Jeremiah Nubbe | Canada | x | 67.23 | 69.28 | 70.49 | x | x | 70.49 | |
| 3rd place, bronze medalist(s) | Benjamín Muñoz | Chile | 65.95 | 67.04 | x | x | x | x | 67.04 | |
| 4 | Miguel Castro | Chile | 65.29 | 66.39 | x | 65.38 | 65.72 | 66.53 | 66.53 | |
| 5 | José Eduardo Chávez | Mexico | 63.51 | 63.28 | 64.15 | 63.24 | 65.78 | 64.96 | 65.78 | |
| 6 | Lautaro Vouilloz | Argentina | 63.15 | x | 65.69 | 65.27 | x | x | 65.69 | |
| 7 | Eduardo Fernandes | Brazil | x | 62.24 | 64.45 | x | x | 62.01 | 64.45 | |
| 8 | Juan Sebastián Scarpetta | Colombia | 62.65 | 56.60 | 63.54 | 62.00 | 62.91 | 64.07 | 64.07 | |
| 9 | David Ayala | El Salvador | 56.35 | 52.25 | 55.33 | | | | 56.35 | |
| 10 | Marcos Lopes | Brazil | x | 55.73 | x | | | | 55.73 | |
| 11 | Leonel González | Cuba | x | x | 51.77 | | | | 51.77 | |

=== Javelin throw ===
18 August

| Rank | Name | Nationality | #1 | #2 | #3 | #4 | #5 | #6 | Result | Notes |
|---|---|---|---|---|---|---|---|---|---|---|
| 1st place, gold medalist(s) | Lars Flaming | Paraguay | 79.05 | 75.79 | 77.94 | 78.32 | 76.97 | 81.56 | 81.56 | GR |
| 2nd place, silver medalist(s) | Leikel Cabrera | Cuba | 72.12 | 70.13 | 74.18 | 74.45 | 75.53 | 75.82 | 75.82 | |
| 3rd place, bronze medalist(s) | Thiago Lacerda | Brazil | 69.77 | x | 65.73 | 63.14 | 65.14 | 69.30 | 69.77 | |
| 4 | Yirmar Torres | Ecuador | 68.04 | 69.23 | 65.47 | 64.86 | 62.02 | 59.13 | 69.23 | |
| 5 | José Alejandro Santana | Puerto Rico | x | 63.88 | x | x | 69.10 | 61.17 | 69.10 | |
| 6 | Anthony Diaz | Trinidad and Tobago | 62.71 | 68.05 | 64.24 | 61.01 | 61.71 | 64.53 | 68.05 | |
| 7 | LeBron James | Trinidad and Tobago | 63.45 | x | 60.96 | 63.55 | 64.30 | 67.42 | 67.42 | |
| 8 | Arthur Curvo | Brazil | 54.20 | x | 64.21 | 61.35 | 65.32 | 61.71 | 65.32 | |
| 9 | Addison James | Dominica | 62.48 | 62.06 | x | | | | 62.48 | |

=== Decathlon ===
18–19 August

The highest mark recorded in each event is highlighted in yellow

| Rank | Athlete | Nationality | 100m | LJ | SP | HJ | 400m | 110m H | DT | PV | JT | 1500m | Points | Notes |
|---|---|---|---|---|---|---|---|---|---|---|---|---|---|---|
| 1st place, gold medalist(s) | Josmi Sánchez | Cuba | 11.23 | 7.31 | 12.35 | 2.03 | 49.77 | 14.45 | 38.92 | 4.50 | 51.79 | 4:47.62 | 7550 | |
| 2nd place, silver medalist(s) | Carlos Córdoba | Venezuela | 11.36 | 6.98 | 12.52 | 1.91 | 49.78 | 15.88 | 44.36 | 4.20 | 61.99 | 4:40.88 | 7393 | |
| 3rd place, bronze medalist(s) | Max Moraga | Chile | 11.01 | 7.21 | 11.58 | 1.85 | 47.77 | 15.50 | 39.75 | 4.00 | 57.02 | 4:44.50 | 7304 | NU20R |
| 4 | Darío Rodríguez | Mexico | 10.73 | 6.47w | 13.08 | 1.85 | 48.79 | 14.93 | 37.63 | 4.00 | 42.81 | 4:45.04 | 7050 | |
| 5 | Luiz Santos | Brazil | 11.39 | 6.99 | 11.71 | 2.03 | 50.31 | 15.79 | 33.93 | 3.90 | 43.12 | 5:18.59 | 6640 | |
| 6 | Abimelec Zamorano | Mexico | 11.22 | 7.03 | 11.82 | 1.91 | 48.41 | 14.95 | 37.56 | NM | 59.80 | 5:18.81 | 6502 | |
| | Alexander Männel | Paraguay | 10.90 | 7.23w | 10.62 | 1.82 | 48.18 | 14.52 | 31.44 | DNS | – | – | DNF | |
| | Antoni Estrada | Venezuela | 11.49 | 6.64 | DNS | – | – | – | – | – | – | – | DNF | |

== Women's results ==
=== 100 metres ===
Heats – 18 August
Wind:
Heat 1: +0.2 m/s, Heat 2: -0.1 m/s

| Rank | Heat | Name | Nationality | Time | Notes |
|---|---|---|---|---|---|
| 1 | 2 | Liranyi Alonso | Dominican Republic | 11.08 | Q, GR |
| 2 | 2 | Shaniqua Bascombe | Trinidad and Tobago | 11.17 | Q |
| 3 | 1 | Frances Colón | Puerto Rico | 11.32 | Q |
| 4 | 2 | Gladymar Torres | Puerto Rico | 11.35 | Q |
| 5 | 1 | Laura Martínez | Colombia | 11.39 | Q |
| 6 | 2 | Marlet Ospino | Colombia | 11.40 | q |
| 7 | 1 | Serena Cole | Jamaica | 11.44 | Q |
| 8 | 2 | Alana Reid | Jamaica | 11.45 | q |
| 9 | 1 | Keliza Smith | Guyana | 11.45 | |
| 10 | 2 | Geolyna Dowdye | Antigua and Barbuda | 11.46 | |
| 11 | 1 | Dariana Flores | Honduras | 12.48 | |
| 12 | 1 | Jazmin Quiñónez | Paraguay | 12.80 | |

Final – 19 August

Wind: +0.2 m/s

| Rank | Lane | Name | Nationality | Time | Notes |
|---|---|---|---|---|---|
| 1st place, gold medalist(s) | 6 | Shaniqua Bascombe | Trinidad and Tobago | 11.19 | |
| 2nd place, silver medalist(s) | 4 | Liranyi Alonso | Dominican Republic | 11.40 | |
| 3rd place, bronze medalist(s) | 5 | Frances Colón | Puerto Rico | 11.46 | |
| 4 | 2 | Serena Cole | Jamaica | 11.47 | |
| 5 | 7 | Gladymar Torres | Puerto Rico | 11.50 | |
| 6 | 8 | Marlet Ospino | Colombia | 11.65 | |
| 7 | 1 | Alana Reid | Jamaica | 11.71 | |
| 8 | 3 | Laura Martínez | Colombia | 12.00 | |

=== 200 metres ===
Heats – 20 August
Wind:
Heat 1: +0.9 m/s, Heat 2: +0.4 m/s

| Rank | Heat | Name | Nationality | Time | Notes |
|---|---|---|---|---|---|
| 1 | 1 | Liranyi Alonso | Dominican Republic | 23.33 | Q |
| 2 | 1 | Laura Martínez | Colombia | 23.61 | Q |
| 3 | 1 | La'nica Locker | Antigua and Barbuda | 23.64 | Q |
| 4 | 2 | Keliza Smith | Guyana | 23.73 | Q |
| 5 | 2 | Marlet Ospino | Colombia | 23.76 | Q |
| 6 | 2 | Emily Martin | Canada | 23.81 | Q |
| 7 | 2 | Marissa Palmer | Jamaica | 23.82 | q |
| 8 | 1 | Alliah Baker | Jamaica | 24.23 | q |
| 9 | 2 | Daniele Campigotto | Brazil | 24.37 | |
| 10 | 1 | Antonia Ramírez | Chile | 24.70 | |
| 11 | 2 | Ivanna McFarlane | Panama | 25.63 | |
| 12 | 1 | Dariana Flores | Honduras | 26.19 | |
| 13 | 1 | Milva Aranda | Paraguay | 26.34 | |
| | 2 | Geolyna Dowdye | Antigua and Barbuda | DNS | |

Final – 21 August

Wind: +0.8 m/s

| Rank | Lane | Name | Nationality | Time | Notes |
|---|---|---|---|---|---|
| 1st place, gold medalist(s) | 6 | Liranyi Alonso | Dominican Republic | 22.69 | GR |
| 2nd place, silver medalist(s) | 4 | Marlet Ospino | Colombia | 23.14 | |
| 3rd place, bronze medalist(s) | 7 | Keliza Smith | Guyana | 23.42 | |
| 4 | 8 | Emily Martin | Canada | 23.48 | |
| 5 | 2 | Marissa Palmer | Jamaica | 23.54 | |
| 6 | 5 | Laura Martínez | Colombia | 23.56 | |
| 7 | 3 | La'nica Locker | Antigua and Barbuda | 23.76 | |
| 8 | 1 | Alliah Baker | Jamaica | 23.80 | |

=== 400 metres ===
Heats – 19 August

| Rank | Heat | Name | Nationality | Time | Notes |
|---|---|---|---|---|---|
| 1 | 2 | Caitlyn Bobb | Bermuda | 52.83 | Q |
| 2 | 2 | Shanakaye Anderson | Jamaica | 53.16 | Q |
| 3 | 1 | Dianna Proctor | Canada | 53.29 | Q |
| 4 | 1 | Paola Loboa | Colombia | 53.96 | Q |
| 5 | 2 | Júlia Ribeiro | Brazil | 54.30 | Q |
| 6 | 2 | Ella Clayton | Canada | 54.51 | q |
| 7 | 2 | Camila Rodríguez | Cuba | 55.48 | q |
| 8 | 1 | Montserrath Gauto | Paraguay | 55.86 | Q |
| 9 | 1 | Ivanna McFarlane | Panama | 57.67 | |
| | 1 | Shanque Williams | Jamaica | DQ | TR16.8 |

Final – 20 August

| Rank | Lane | Name | Nationality | Time | Notes |
|---|---|---|---|---|---|
| 1st place, gold medalist(s) | 5 | Dianna Proctor | Canada | 51.97 | GR |
| 2nd place, silver medalist(s) | 4 | Caitlyn Bobb | Bermuda | 52.14 | |
| 3rd place, bronze medalist(s) | 6 | Shanakaye Anderson | Jamaica | 53.41 | |
| 4 | 3 | Júlia Ribeiro | Brazil | 53.63 | |
| 5 | 7 | Paola Loboa | Colombia | 54.20 | |
| 6 | 1 | Ella Clayton | Canada | 55.19 | |
| 7 | 8 | Montserrath Gauto | Paraguay | 55.94 | |
| | 2 | Camila Rodríguez | Cuba | DNF | |

=== 800 metres ===
19 August

| Rank | Name | Nationality | Time | Notes |
|---|---|---|---|---|
| 1st place, gold medalist(s) | Sabrina Pena | Brazil | 2:05.87 | GR |
| 2nd place, silver medalist(s) | Avery Pearson | Canada | 2:06.09 | |
| 3rd place, bronze medalist(s) | María Rojas | Venezuela | 2:06.10 | |
| 4 | Kishay Rowe | Jamaica | 2:06.95 | |
| 5 | Layla Haynes | Barbados | 2:08.19 | |
| 6 | Anita Poma | Peru | 2:09.83 | |
| 7 | Luíse Braga | Brazil | 2:10.11 | |
| 8 | Araceli Martínez | Paraguay | 2:14.45 | |
| | Melissa Padrón | Cuba | DNS | |

=== 1500 metres ===
20 August

| Rank | Name | Nationality | Time | Notes |
|---|---|---|---|---|
| 1st place, gold medalist(s) | Dafne Juárez | Mexico | 4:23.58 | |
| 2nd place, silver medalist(s) | Sabrina Salcedo | Mexico | 4:24.87 | |
| 3rd place, bronze medalist(s) | Carmen Alder | Ecuador | 4:25.20 | |
| 4 | Anita Poma | Peru | 4:27.95 | |
| 5 | Kishay Rowe | Jamaica | 4:29.03 | |
| 6 | Juana Zuberbuhler | Argentina | 4:29.08 | |
| 7 | Karol Luna | Colombia | 4:29.12 | |
| 8 | Luíse Braga | Brazil | 4:32.06 | |
| 9 | Matilde Ruiz | Chile | 4:35.29 | |
| 10 | Sabrina Pena | Brazil | 4:37.60 | |

=== 5000 metres ===
21 August

| Rank | Name | Nationality | Time | Notes |
|---|---|---|---|---|
| 1st place, gold medalist(s) | Dafne Juárez | Mexico | 15:51.27 | GR |
| 2nd place, silver medalist(s) | Jayden Keeler | Canada | 15:56.77 | |
| 3rd place, bronze medalist(s) | Sabrina Salcedo | Mexico | 16:09.11 | |
| 4 | Carmen Alder | Ecuador | 16:36.93 | |
| 5 | Luz Arias | Peru | 16:59.04 | |
| 6 | Yessica Patatingo | Peru | 17:11.81 | |
| 7 | Vanessa Alder | Ecuador | 17:12.95 | |
| 8 | Lilian Mateo | Bolivia | 17:14.52 | |
| 9 | Katiria González | Puerto Rico | 17:17.51 | |
| 10 | Steycha Feliciano | Puerto Rico | 17:44.59 | |
| 11 | Amelie Guzmán | Bolivia | 17:54.35 | |
| 12 | Francisca Urra | Chile | 18:09.08 | |
| | Karol Luna | Colombia | DNF | |

=== 10,000 metres ===
18 August

| Rank | Name | Nationality | Time | Notes |
|---|---|---|---|---|
| 1st place, gold medalist(s) | Jayden Keeler | Canada | 34:16.61 | GR |
| 2nd place, silver medalist(s) | Mariel Salazar | Mexico | 36:04.08 | |
| 3rd place, bronze medalist(s) | Luz Rocha | Mexico | 36:20.93 | |
| 4 | Tamara Villegas | Chile | 36:25.24 | |
| 5 | Kariana Figueroa | Puerto Rico | 37:34.93 | |
| 6 | Francisca Urra | Chile | 37:51.47 | |
| 7 | Vanessa Alder | Ecuador | 38:22.01 | |
| 8 | Isabele Carlos | Brazil | 38:49.85 | |
| 9 | Alondra Santos | Puerto Rico | 39:18.30 | |
| 10 | Marta Cosajay | Guatemala | 39:53.24 | |
| 11 | Luísa de Almeida | Brazil | 40:53.66 | |

=== 100 metres hurdles ===
Heats – 19 August
Wind:
Heat 1: +2.0 m/s, Heat 2: +2.3 m/s

| Rank | Heat | Name | Nationality | Time | Notes |
|---|---|---|---|---|---|
| 1 | 1 | Jocelyn Echazabal | Cuba | 12.95 | Q, GR |
| 2 | 2 | Oneka Wilson | Jamaica | 13.27 | Q |
| 3 | 1 | Briana Campbell | Jamaica | 13.37 | Q |
| 4 | 1 | Maya Rollins | Barbados | 13.42 | Q |
| 5 | 2 | Lays Silva | Brazil | 13.43 | Q |
| 6 | 1 | Pietra Simões | Brazil | 13.57 | q, .561 |
| 7 | 1 | Catalina Arellano | Chile | 13.57 | q, .564 |
| 8 | 2 | Helen Bernard | Argentina | 13.65 | Q |
| 9 | 2 | Naomi Ríos | Puerto Rico | 13.83 | |
| 10 | 1 | Grace Otero | Puerto Rico | 13.85 | NU20R |
| 11 | 2 | Nathalie Almendarez | El Salvador | 14.01 | |
| 12 | 2 | Luciana Zapata | Colombia | 14.51 | |
| 13 | 1 | Rossmary Paredes | Paraguay | 15.11 | |
| | 1 | María Alejandra Alvarado | Argentina | DNF | |
| | 2 | Maliah Edwards | Barbados | DNF | |

Final – 20 August

Wind: -0.1 m/s

| Rank | Lane | Name | Nationality | Time | Notes |
|---|---|---|---|---|---|
| 1st place, gold medalist(s) | 4 | Jocelyn Echazabal | Cuba | 13.29 | |
| 2nd place, silver medalist(s) | 2 | Maya Rollins | Barbados | 13.51 | |
| 3rd place, bronze medalist(s) | 6 | Lays Silva | Brazil | 13.60 | |
| 4 | 7 | Helen Bernard | Argentina | 13.73 | |
| 5 | 1 | Pietra Simões | Brazil | 13.81 | |
| 6 | 8 | Catalina Arellano | Chile | 13.96 | |
| | 5 | Oneka Wilson | Jamaica | DNF | |
| | 3 | Briana Campbell | Jamaica | DQ | TR22.6 |

=== 400 metres hurdles ===
20 August

| Rank | Lane | Name | Nationality | Time | Notes |
|---|---|---|---|---|---|
| 1st place, gold medalist(s) | 2 | Antonia Sánchez | Mexico | 55.91 | GR |
| 2nd place, silver medalist(s) | 5 | Michelle Smith | Virgin Islands | 56.61 | |
| 3rd place, bronze medalist(s) | 3 | Daynea Colstock | Jamaica | 58.78 | |
| 4 | 6 | Camille de Oliveira | Brazil | 59.08 | |
| 5 | 4 | Liliet Cabrera | Cuba | 1:00.15 | |
| 6 | 1 | Micheiry Brito | Dominican Republic | 1:00.79 | |
| 7 | 8 | Helen Bernard | Argentina | 1:01.08 | |
| 8 | 7 | Betsi Casanova | Cuba | 1:02.08 | |

=== 3000 metres steeplechase ===
22 August

| Rank | Name | Nationality | Time | Notes |
|---|---|---|---|---|
| 1st place, gold medalist(s) | Verónica Huacasi | Peru | 10:20.55 | GR |
| 2nd place, silver medalist(s) | Laura Camargo | Colombia | 10:42.47 | |
| 3rd place, bronze medalist(s) | Sofía Peña | Mexico | 10:44.15 | |
| 4 | Leydi Roura | Ecuador | 10:58.28 | |
| 5 | Andrea Ávalos | Mexico | 11:01.78 | |
| 6 | Joaquina Durá | Argentina | 11:07.66 | |
| 7 | Alison Guamán | Ecuador | 11:23.02 | |
| 8 | Aylana Cezar | Brazil | 12:06.24 | |
| 9 | Shalom Lescano | Argentina | 12:08.92 | |

=== 4 × 100 metres relay ===
21 August

| Rank | Lane | Team | Competitors | Time | Notes |
|---|---|---|---|---|---|
| 1st place, gold medalist(s) | 7 | Jamaica | Sabrina Dockery, Marissa Palmer, Serena Cole, Alana Reid | 43.51 | GR |
| 2nd place, silver medalist(s) | 2 | Trinidad and Tobago | Alexxe Henry, Shaniqua Bascombe, Sierra Joseph, Janae De Gannes | 43.89 | |
| 3rd place, bronze medalist(s) | 6 | Colombia | Marlet Ospino, Laura Martínez, Danna Banquez, Natalia Linares | 44.01 | |
| 4 | 5 | Brazil | Lays Silva, Daniele Campigotto, Pietra Simões, Vanessa dos Santos | 45.72 | |
| 5 | 4 | Cuba | Rosmaiby Quesada, Jocelyn Echazabal, Dianelys Alacán, Betsi Casanova | 47.28 | |
| 6 | 8 | Paraguay | Victoria Duarte, Montserrath Gauto, Milva Aranda, Jazmin Quiñónez | 48.98 | |
| | 3 | Puerto Rico | Grace Otero, Gladymar Torres, Legna Echevarría, Frances Colón | DQ | TR24.7 |

=== 4 × 400 metres relay ===
22 August

| Rank | Lane | Team | Competitors | Time | Notes |
|---|---|---|---|---|---|
| 1st place, gold medalist(s) | 4 | Canada | Izzy Goudros, Emily Martin, Avery Pearson, Dianna Proctor | 3:31.73 | GR |
| 2nd place, silver medalist(s) | 7 | Jamaica | Shanque Williams, Oneika Brissett, Daynea Colstock, Shanakaye Anderson | 3:31.74 | |
| 3rd place, bronze medalist(s) | 8 | Mexico | Jazmín López, Shakti Álvarez, Kenya Maturana, Antonia Sánchez | 3:31.95 | |
| 4 | 5 | Brazil | Camille de Oliveira, Bianca de Almeida, Sabrina Pena, Júlia Ribeiro | 3:38.75 | |
| 5 | 6 | Cuba | Liliet Cabrera, Betsi Casanova, Jocelyn Echazabal, Camila Rodríguez | 3:40.71 | |
| 6 | 3 | Paraguay | Milva Aranda, Jeruti Noguera, Araceli Martínez, Montserrath Gauto | 3:56.32 | NR |

=== 20,000 metres race walk ===
18 August

| Rank | Name | Nationality | Time | Penalties | Notes |
|---|---|---|---|---|---|
| 1st place, gold medalist(s) | Karla Serrano | Mexico | 1:31:40.1 | | GR, NR |
| 2nd place, silver medalist(s) | Valeria Flores | Mexico | 1:33:21.4 | ~> | |
| 3rd place, bronze medalist(s) | Natalia Pulido | Colombia | 1:35:11.0 | ~ | |
| 4 | Ruby Segura | Colombia | 1:36:54.0 | | |
| 5 | Sharon Herrera | Costa Rica | 1:39:47.0 | ~~> | |
| 6 | Yadira Orihuela | Peru | 1:40:28.4 | | |
| 7 | Sasha Quispe | Peru | 1:42:20.4 | | |
| | Yaquelin Teletor | Guatemala | DQ | >>>> | TR54.7.5 |

=== High jump ===
22 August

| Rank | Name | Nationality | 1.65 | 1.70 | 1.73 | 1.76 | 1.79 | 1.82 | 1.84 | 1.86 | 1.88 | Result | Notes |
|---|---|---|---|---|---|---|---|---|---|---|---|---|---|
| 1st place, gold medalist(s) | María Arboleda | Colombia | – | – | o | o | xo | xo | xo | o | xxx | 1.86 | |
| 2nd place, silver medalist(s) | Ahshareah Enoe | Grenada | o | o | o | o | o | o | xxo | xo | xxx | 1.86 | |
| 3rd place, bronze medalist(s) | Tricia Madourie | Canada | – | – | o | o | o | xo | xxx | | | 1.82 | |
| 4 | Maria Eduarda Barbosa | Brazil | – | o | xo | o | xxo | xxx | | | | 1.79 | |
| 4 | Hellen Tenorio | Colombia | – | o | o | xo | xxo | xxx | | | | 1.79 | |
| 6 | Arielly Rodrigues | Brazil | – | xo | o | xxx | | | | | | 1.73 | |
| 7 | Ana Isabella González | El Salvador | o | o | xxo | xxx | | | | | | 1.73 | |
| 8 | Dailin Sierra | Cuba | o | o | xxx | | | | | | | 1.70 | |
| 9 | Arienne Birch | Canada | o | xxx | | | | | | | | 1.65 | |

=== Pole vault ===
20 August

| Rank | Name | Nationality | 3.10 | 3.30 | 3.50 | 3.60 | 3.70 | 3.80 | 3.90 | 4.00 | 4.10 | 4.25 | 4.35 | 4.45 | 4.51 | Result | Notes |
|---|---|---|---|---|---|---|---|---|---|---|---|---|---|---|---|---|---|
| 1st place, gold medalist(s) | Jennifer Elizarov | Canada | – | – | – | – | – | – | – | – | o | xxo | xxo | xo | xxx | 4.45 | GR |
| 2nd place, silver medalist(s) | Heather Abadie | Canada | – | – | – | – | – | – | o | xxo | xxx | | | | | 4.00 | |
| 3rd place, bronze medalist(s) | Luana de Moura | Brazil | – | – | – | o | – | o | o | xxx | | | | | | 3.90 | |
| 4 | Diana García | Mexico | – | – | – | o | – | o | – | xxx | | | | | | 3.80 | |
| 5 | Andrea Velasco | Mexico | – | – | – | – | xo | o | xxx | | | | | | | 3.80 | |
| 5 | Júlia Calabretti | Brazil | – | – | o | – | xo | o | xxx | | | | | | | 3.80 | |
| 7 | Carolina Scarponi | Argentina | – | – | o | o | xxo | o | xxx | | | | | | | 3.80 | |
| 8 | Luna Pabón | Colombia | – | – | – | o | o | xo | xxx | | | | | | | 3.80 | |
| 9 | Luciana Gómez | Argentina | – | – | – | – | xo | xxx | | | | | | | | 3.70 | |
| 10 | Javiera Moraga | Chile | – | – | xo | o | xxx | | | | | | | | | 3.60 | |
| 11 | Josefina Britez | Paraguay | o | o | xo | xxx | | | | | | | | | | 3.50 | |

=== Long jump ===
18 August

| Rank | Name | Nationality | #1 | #2 | #3 | #4 | #5 | #6 | Result | Notes |
|---|---|---|---|---|---|---|---|---|---|---|
| 1st place, gold medalist(s) | Natalia Linares | Colombia | 6.66 | 6.55 | 6.66 | 6.77 | 6.56 | 6.92 | 6.92 | GR, AU23R |
| 2nd place, silver medalist(s) | Rosmaiby Quesada | Cuba | 5.72 | 5.94 | 6.35 | 6.07 | 3.80 | 6.16 | 6.35 | |
| 3rd place, bronze medalist(s) | Janae De Gannes | Trinidad and Tobago | 6.33 | 5.80 | 6.21 | 5.68 | 5.67 | 6.17 | 6.33 | |
| 4 | Angie Palacios | Colombia | x | x | 6.19 | 5.96 | 5.84 | 5.99 | 6.19 | |
| 5 | Rohanna Sudlow | Jamaica | x | 6.04 | 6.15 | x | x | 5.83 | 6.15 | |
| 6 | Vanessa dos Santos | Brazil | x | 6.07 | 6.10 | x | x | 6.06 | 6.10 | |
| 7 | Brooklyn Lyttle | Belize | 5.59 | 5.81 | 5.92 | 6.02 | 5.83 | 5.70 | 6.02 | |
| 8 | Macheada Linton | Jamaica | x | x | 5.79 | 5.53 | x | x | 5.79 | |
| 9 | Victoria Duarte | Paraguay | x | 5.07 | 4.95 | | | | 5.07 | |

=== Triple jump ===
21 August

| Rank | Name | Nationality | #1 | #2 | #3 | #4 | #5 | #6 | Result | Notes |
|---|---|---|---|---|---|---|---|---|---|---|
| 1st place, gold medalist(s) | Lidsay González | Cuba | 13.47 | x | 13.96 | x | x | 13.52 | 13.96 | |
| 2nd place, silver medalist(s) | Paola del Real | Mexico | x | 13.11 | 13.58 | 13.14 | x | 13.21 | 13.58 | NU20R |
| 3rd place, bronze medalist(s) | Ariday Girón | Cuba | 12.92 | 13.34 | 13.32 | 13.25 | x | 13.43 | 13.43 | |
| 4 | Ornelis Ortiz | Venezuela | x | 12.88 | 12.69 | x | 13.39 | 13.24 | 13.39 | |
| 5 | Keneisha Shelbourne | Trinidad and Tobago | 12.80 | x | 13.11 | 13.18 | x | 12.89 | 13.18 | NU20R |
| 6 | Valeria Uribe | Mexico | 11.88 | 12.13 | 12.88 | 12.00 | 12.26 | 11.20 | 12.88 | |
| 7 | Macheada Linton | Jamaica | 12.45 | 12.26 | 11.81 | x | 12.59 | x | 12.59 | |
| 8 | Danisha Chimilio | Guatemala | 11.98 | x | x | 12.54 | 12.56 | 12.14 | 12.56 | |
| 9 | Matilde Tejos | Chile | 11.46 | x | 11.75 | | | | 11.75 | |

=== Shot put ===
21 August

| Rank | Name | Nationality | #1 | #2 | #3 | #4 | #5 | #6 | Result | Notes |
|---|---|---|---|---|---|---|---|---|---|---|
| 1st place, gold medalist(s) | Treneese Hamilton | Dominica | 16.88 | x | 17.03 | 16.33 | x | 17.21 | 17.21 | |
| 2nd place, silver medalist(s) | Liv Sands | Canada | x | 14.15 | 16.13 | 16.46 | x | x | 16.46 | |
| 3rd place, bronze medalist(s) | Belsy Quiñónez | Ecuador | 15.64 | 16.40 | 15.65 | 15.99 | 15.62 | 15.89 | 16.40 | NR, NU20R |
| 4 | Mariela Pérez | Chile | 15.25 | 15.35 | 15.25 | 15.47 | 15.44 | 15.46 | 15.47 | |
| 5 | Kimeka Smith | Jamaica | x | 14.40 | 13.73 | 14.19 | 14.08 | 14.14 | 14.40 | |
| 6 | Marla-Kay Lampart | Jamaica | 12.06 | 14.20 | x | 13.42 | x | 12.77 | 14.20 | |
| 7 | Taniele da Silva | Brazil | 14.08 | 13.81 | x | x | x | x | 14.08 | |
| 8 | Annae Mackey | Bahamas | 12.71 | 13.35 | 13.81 | – | – | – | 13.81 | |
| 9 | Alicia Grootfaam | Suriname | 12.39 | 12.06 | 13.00 | | | | 13.00 | |

=== Discus throw ===
18 August

| Rank | Name | Nationality | #1 | #2 | #3 | #4 | #5 | #6 | Result | Notes |
|---|---|---|---|---|---|---|---|---|---|---|
| 1st place, gold medalist(s) | Alejandra Mesa | Cuba | 54.42 | 52.10 | 52.87 | x | 45.72 | x | 54.42 | |
| 2nd place, silver medalist(s) | Ottaynis Febres | Venezuela | 51.60 | 54.40 | 50.29 | 51.78 | x | x | 54.40 | |
| 3rd place, bronze medalist(s) | Maria Eduarda de Matos | Brazil | 50.62 | 53.21 | x | 50.19 | x | 48.68 | 53.21 | |
| 4 | Neilyn Rodríguez | Cuba | 49.62 | 49.70 | 50.15 | 49.43 | 48.96 | 49.88 | 50.15 | |
| 5 | Jamora Alves | Grenada | x | 46.34 | 48.76 | 49.44 | x | x | 49.44 | |
| 6 | Lalenii Grant | Trinidad and Tobago | 48.82 | x | x | x | x | 46.09 | 48.82 | |
| 7 | Damali Williams | Jamaica | 46.22 | 48.58 | 41.13 | 48.50 | x | x | 48.58 | |
| 8 | Rochelle Solmon | Jamaica | 47.76 | 45.53 | 44.06 | x | x | x | 47.76 | |
| 9 | Shakera Kirk | Trinidad and Tobago | 45.62 | x | 47.57 | | | | 47.57 | |
| 10 | Samanta Lopes | Brazil | 46.85 | x | 46.85 | | | | 46.85 | |
| | Annae Mackey | Bahamas | x | x | x | | | | NM | |

=== Hammer throw ===
22 August

| Rank | Name | Nationality | #1 | #2 | #3 | #4 | #5 | #6 | Result | Notes |
|---|---|---|---|---|---|---|---|---|---|---|
| 1st place, gold medalist(s) | Yarielis Torres | Puerto Rico | 66.02 | 65.31 | x | 62.39 | 64.32 | x | 66.02 | |
| 2nd place, silver medalist(s) | Nereida Santa Cruz | Ecuador | 62.88 | x | x | x | x | x | 62.88 | |
| 3rd place, bronze medalist(s) | Paola Bueno | Mexico | 60.76 | 61.34 | 58.34 | 61.33 | 61.32 | 61.84 | 61.84 | |
| 4 | Yaniely Torres | Puerto Rico | 60.86 | 59.30 | 59.05 | 57.50 | x | x | 60.86 | |
| 5 | Yenniver Veroes | Venezuela | 58.10 | x | 59.03 | 58.82 | x | 60.03 | 60.03 | |
| 6 | Juliana Baigorria | Argentina | x | 59.95 | 56.77 | 53.49 | 55.88 | 55.76 | 59.95 | |
| 7 | Elvia Canela | Mexico | x | 58.03 | 57.75 | 55.69 | 56.39 | 56.95 | 58.03 | |
| 8 | Carmela Cocco | Argentina | 55.08 | 55.80 | 57.34 | x | 54.09 | x | 57.34 | |
| 9 | Agnys dos Santos | Brazil | 54.10 | 56.44 | x | | | | 56.44 | |
| 10 | Sophie Pérez | Guatemala | x | 55.06 | 56.01 | | | | 56.01 | |

=== Javelin throw ===
18 August

| Rank | Name | Nationality | #1 | #2 | #3 | #4 | #5 | #6 | Result | Notes |
|---|---|---|---|---|---|---|---|---|---|---|
| 1st place, gold medalist(s) | Valentina Barrios | Colombia | 58.34 | 57.36 | 55.53 | 60.16 | x | 55.48 | 60.16 | GR |
| 2nd place, silver medalist(s) | Manuela Rotundo | Uruguay | 53.03 | 57.07 | x | 56.56 | 57.44 | x | 57.44 | |
| 3rd place, bronze medalist(s) | Claudia Guerrero | Cuba | 48.17 | 48.41 | 45.16 | x | 47.16 | x | 48.41 | |
| 4 | Milagros Rosas | Argentina | 43.27 | 47.56 | 46.82 | 45.81 | 46.40 | 46.45 | 47.56 | |
| 5 | Anisha Gibbons | Guyana | 36.51 | x | 44.73 | 40.12 | 47.13 | 43.88 | 47.13 | |
| 6 | Taysha Stubbs | Bahamas | 45.45 | 43.64 | 43.46 | 42.05 | 41.35 | x | 45.45 | |
| 7 | Hashly Ayovi | Ecuador | 38.90 | 41.95 | 38.93 | 36.14 | x | 41.78 | 41.95 | |
| 8 | María José Cáceres | Paraguay | 37.29 | 41.13 | x | 37.44 | x | 39.92 | 41.13 | |
| 9 | Stefany da Silva | Brazil | 40.54 | 39.09 | – | | | | 40.54 | |

=== Heptathlon ===
19–20 August

The highest mark recorded in each event is highlighted in yellow

| Rank | Athlete | Nationality | 100m H | HJ | SP | 200m | LJ | JT | 800m | Points | Notes |
|---|---|---|---|---|---|---|---|---|---|---|---|
| 1st place, gold medalist(s) | Izzy Goudros | Canada | 13.62 | 1.60 | 9.90 | 23.75 | 6.17 | 30.31 | 2:15.93 | 5561 | |
| 2nd place, silver medalist(s) | Ana Luisa Ferraz | Brazil | 13.58 | 1.60 | 11.84 | 24.77 | 5.82 | 32.60 | 2:17.82 | 5508 | |
| 3rd place, bronze medalist(s) | Ana Paula Argüello | Paraguay | 13.93 | 1.63 | 11.43 | 25.11 | 5.67 | 34.46 | 2:31.14 | 5249 | |
| 4 | Renata Godoy | Argentina | 15.18 | 1.63 | 11.30 | 27.04 | 5.21 | 38.31 | 2:28.57 | 4875 | |
| 5 | Valeria Páez | Mexico | 14.76 | 1.60 | 10.26 | 27.09 | 5.41 | 35.35 | 2:28.37 | 4825 | |
| 6 | Ana Isabella González | El Salvador | 14.29 | 1.69 | 8.71 | 26.16 | 5.30 | 22.54 | 2:20.65 | 4802 | |
| 7 | Kellys Madrazo | Cuba | 14.06 | 1.66 | 11.01 | DQ | 5.73 | 35.01 | 2:30.77 | 4395 | |
| | Tainara Mees | Brazil | 14.03 | 1.60 | 13.23 | DNF | DNS | – | – | DNF | |
| | Sherika Christie | Jamaica | DNF | 1.60 | 10.83 | DNS | – | – | – | DNF | |
| | Rosmaiby Quesada | Cuba | 13.71 | NM | DNS | – | – | – | – | DNF | |

== Mixed results ==
=== 4 × 400 metres relay ===
18 August

| Rank | Lane | Team | Competitors | Time | Notes |
|---|---|---|---|---|---|
| 1st place, gold medalist(s) | 6 | Brazil | Jadson de Lima, Bianca de Almeida, Elias dos Santos, Júlia Ribeiro | 3:19.98 | |
| 2nd place, silver medalist(s) | 7 | Cuba | Yohendris Bientz, Camila Rodríguez, Pierre Castillo, Melisa Padrón | 3:21.01 | |
| 3rd place, bronze medalist(s) | 5 | Guyana | Malachi Austin, Narissa McPherson, Simeon Adams, Keliza Smith | 3:22.30 | |
| 4 | 3 | Jamaica | Omary Robinson, Oneika Brissett, Kevin Bliss, Abriana Wright | 3:23.07 | |
| 5 | 8 | Mexico | José Manuel Rodríguez, Shakti Álvarez, Amado Amador, Kenya Maturana | 3:30.00 | |
| 6 | 4 | Argentina | Agustin Coronel, Juana Zuberbuhler, Bruno de Genaro, Helen Bernard | 3:31.94 | |
| 7 | 2 | Paraguay | Iván Eduardo Britez, Jeruti Noguera, Giuliano Ruffinelli, Araceli Martínez | 3:45.64 | |
