= David Ninavia =

Bolivian distance runner

Personal information
- Full name: David Ninavia Mamani
- Born: 4 February 2003 (age 23)

Sport
- Sport: Athletics
- Events: 1500 metres; 5000 metres; 10,000 metres
Medal record
Representing Bolivia
Men's Athletics
South American Games
Bronze medal – third place	2022 Asunción	5000 m
Junior Pan American Games
Gold medal – first place	2021 Cali-Valle	5000 m
Silver medal – second place	2025 Asunción	10,000 m
South American U23 Championships
Gold medal – first place	2022 Cascavel	5000 m
Gold medal – first place	2022 Cascavel	10,000 m
South American U20 Championships
Gold medal – first place	2021 Lima	5000 m
Bronze medal – third place	2021 Lima	3000 m

David Ninavia Mamani (born 4 February 2003) is a Bolivian distance runner. He has won multiple medals at regional level. He also hold several national records.

== International competitions ==
Year	Competition	Venue	Position	Event	Notes
Representing Bolivia
2021	South American Championships	Guayaquil, Ecuador	9th	5000 m	14:36.94
2021	South American U20 Championships	Lima, Peru	3rd	3000 m	8:23.01
2021	South American U20 Championships	Lima, Peru	1st	5000 m	14:29.0
2021	South American U23 Championships	Guayaquil, Ecuador	3rd	5000 m	14:51.36
2021	South American U23 Championships	Guayaquil, Ecuador	3rd	10,000 m	31:08.34
2021	Junior Pan American Games (U23)	Cali, Colombia	1st	5000 m	14:21.36
2021	Junior Pan American Games (U23)	Cali, Colombia	–	10,000 m	DQ
2022	South American Indoor Championships	Cochabamba, Bolivia	1st	1500 m	3:56.16
2022	Bolivarian Games	Valledupar, Colombia	2nd	1500 m	3:43.60
2022	World U20 Championships	Cali, Colombia	27th (h)	1500 m	3:52.18
2022	World U20 Championships	Cali, Colombia	16th	5000 m	14:42.76
2022	South American U23 Championships	Cascavel, Brazil	1st	5000 m	14:39.91
2022	South American U23 Championships	Cascavel, Brazil	1st	10,000 m	30:05.08
2022	South American Games	Asunción, Paraguay	6th	5000 m	3:49.41
2022	South American Games	Asunción, Paraguay	3rd	10,000 m	14:08.37
2024	South American Indoor Championships	Cochabamba, Bolivia	1st	1500 m	3:56.65
2024	South American Indoor Championships	Cochabamba, Bolivia	1st	3000 m	8:26.73
2024	Ibero-American Championships	Cuiabá, Brazil	1st	3000 m	8:05.26
2024	Ibero-American Championships	Cuiabá, Brazil	4th	5000 m	14:30.31
2024	Bolivarian Games	Ayacucho, Peru	1st	10 km	37:06
2024	Bolivarian Games	Ayacucho, Peru	3rd	Half marathon relay	1:23:34
2025	South American Indoor Championships	Cochabamba, Bolivia	2nd	1500 m	3:52.48
2025	South American Indoor Championships	Cochabamba, Bolivia	1st	3000 m	8:30.66
2025	South American Championships	Mar del Plata, Argentina	14th	1500 m	4:01.83
2025	Junior Pan American Games (U23)	Asunción, Paraguay	7th	5000 m	14:44.93
2025	Junior Pan American Games (U23)	Asunción, Paraguay	2nd	10,000 m	31:03.2
2026	South American Indoor Championships	Cochabamba, Bolivia	2nd	1500 m	3:51.20
2026	Ibero-American Championships	Lima, Peru	11th	5000 m	14:35.53
2026	South American Games	Santa Fe, Argentina	6th	5000 m	14:22.94
2026	South American Games	Santa Fe, Argentina	4th	10,000 m	29:33.30

== Personal bests ==
Outdoor

- 800 metres – 1:55.62 A (Cochabamba 2022)
- 1500 metres – 3:43.60 (Valledupar 2022) NR
- 3000 metres – 8:05.26 (Cuiabá 2024) NR
- 5000 metres – 14:08.37 (Asunción 2022)
- 10,000 metres – 30:05.08 (Cascavel 2022)

Indoor

- 1500 metres – 3:52.48 A (Cochabamba 2025)
- 3000 metres – 8:26.73 A (Cochabamba 2024)
