= Athletics at the 2024 Bolivarian Games =

Athletics at the Bicentennial Bolivarian Games
- Dates: 29 November – 1 December
- Host city: Ayacucho, Peru
- Level: Senior
- Events: 3
- Participation: 35 athletes from 6 nations

Athletics competitions at the 2024 Bolivarian Games in Ayacucho, Peru were held on 29 November and 1 December 2024. With this edition being the special Bicentennial one, only three events were contested, two cross country races and a half marathon relay.

== Medal summary ==
=== Men's events ===
Event	Gold		Silver		Bronze	
10 kilometres cross country	Walter Nina; Peru	34:48	José Luis Rojas; Peru	34:58	Segundo Jami; Ecuador	36:25

=== Women's events ===
Event	Gold		Silver		Bronze	
8 kilometres cross country	Jovana de la Cruz; Peru	32:29	Gladys Tejeda; Peru	32:48	Jhoselyn Camargo; Bolivia	33:44

=== Mixed events ===
Event	Gold		Silver		Bronze	
Half marathon relay	Guatemala (GUA); Sandra Raxón; Mario Pacay; Viviana Aroche; Alberto González	1:20:04	Ecuador (ECU); Rosa Chacha; Fernando Moreno; Mary Granja; Diego Arevalo	1:20:52	Bolivia (BOL); Gabriela Mamani; Rubén Arando; Jhoselyn Camargo; David Ninavia	1:23:34

== Medal table ==
* Host nation (Colombia)

Rank	Nation	Gold	Silver	Bronze	Total
1	Peru (PER)*	2	2	0	4
2	Guatemala (GUA)	1	0	0	1
3	Ecuador (ECU)	0	1	1	2
4	Bolivia (BOL)	0	0	2	2
Totals (4 entries)		3	3	3	9

== Results ==
=== Men's 10 kilometres cross country race ===
29 November

Rank	Name	Nationality	Time	Notes
1st place, gold medalist(s)	Walter Nina	Peru	34:48	
2nd place, silver medalist(s)	José Luis Rojas	Peru	34:58	
3rd place, bronze medalist(s)	Segundo Jami	Ecuador	36:25	
4	David Ninavia	Bolivia	37:06	
5	Yeisson Parra	Colombia	37:20	
6	Rubén Arando	Bolivia	37:49	
7	Rafael Loza	Ecuador	40:12	
8	Jeferson Sazo	Guatemala	40:53	
9	Diddier Rodríguez	Panama	43:55	
10	José Cedeño	Panama	46:08	

=== Women's 8 kilometres cross country race ===
29 November

Rank	Name	Nationality	Time	Notes
1st place, gold medalist(s)	Jovana de la Cruz	Peru	32:29	
2nd place, silver medalist(s)	Gladys Tejeda	Peru	32:48	
3rd place, bronze medalist(s)	Jhoselyn Camargo	Bolivia	33:44	
4	Silvia Ortiz	Ecuador	35:22	
4	Katerine Tisalema	Ecuador	35:22	
6	Gabriela Mamani	Bolivia	36:34	
7	Leidy Rivera	Colombia	37:29	
8	Débora Betsabé	Guatemala	42:27	
	Jeidy Mora	Colombia	DNF	

=== Mixed half marathon relay ===
1 December

Rank	Lane	Team	Name	Time	Notes
1st place, gold medalist(s)	Guatemala	Sandra Raxón, Mario Pacay, Viviana Aroche, Alberto González	1:20:04		
2nd place, silver medalist(s)	Ecuador	Rosa Chacha, Fernando Moreno, Mary Granja, Diego Arevalo	1:20:52		
3rd place, bronze medalist(s)	Bolivia	Gabriela Mamani, Rubén Arando, Jhoselyn Camargo, David Ninavia	1:23:34		
4	Colombia	Shellcy Sarmiento, Rubén Barbosa, Leidy Lozano, Nicolás Herrera	1:25:10		
	Peru	Saida Meneses, Jhonatan Molina, Sheyla Paucar, Ulises Martín	DQ	R24.7e	

== Participation ==
- Bolivia (4)
- Colombia (7)
- Ecuador (8)
- Guatemala (6)
- Panama (2)
- Peru (8)
