= Keliza Smith =

Guyanese athlete (born 2003)

Personal information
- Full name: Keliza Ashley Smith
- Nationality: Guyanese
- Born: 25 April 2003 (age 23)

Sport
- Sport: Athletics
- Event: Sprinter

Achievements and titles
- Personal bests: 60m: 7.28 (Lubbock, 2025); 100m: 11.37 (Leonora, 2022) NU20R; 200m: 23.08 (Lubbock, 2025); 400m: 52.91 (Tuscaloosa, 2025)
Medal record
Women's athletics
Representing Guyana
Islamic Solidarity Games
Bronze medal – third place	2025 Riyadh	100 m
Junior Pan American Games
Bronze medal – third place	2025 Asunción	200 m
Bronze medal – third place	2025 Asunción	Mixed relay

Keliza Ashley Smith (born 25 April 2003) is a Guyanese sprinter. She is a multiple-time national champion and Guyanese under-20 national record holder over 100 metres. She was a bronze medalist over 200 metres at the 2025 Junior Pan American Games.

== Biography ==
Smith is a member of the Running Brave Athletic Club (RBAC). She won at the senior Guyanese Athletics Championships for the first time in 2019, winning over 400 metres in Georgetown, Guyana.

In 2022, she won the Guyanese national championships titles over 100 metres and 200 metres, setting a new championship record for the 100 metres and a new Guyanese under-20 record for the 200 metres at the championships.

In February 2025, Smith won over 60 metres and 400 metres competing for Barton Community College women's track and field team in the United States at the KJCCC/Region 6 Indoor Championships in Lubbock, Texas.

Smith was the bronze medalist over 200 metres at the 2025 Junior Pan American Games in Asunción, Paraguay, having qualified for the final with a time of 23.08 seconds before running 23.42 seconds in the final to finish behind Marlet Ospino of Colombia and Liranyi Alonso of the Dominican Republic.

Smith was the bronze medalist over 100 metres at the 2025 Islamic Solidarity Games in Riyadh, running 11.62 seconds to reach the final and 11.59 seconds in the final.

In July 2026, she competed in the 100 metres at the 2026 Commonwealth Games. She was also a semi-finalist in the women's 200 metres at the Games in Glasgow, Scotland.
