= Treneese Hamilton =

Dominican athlete (born 2003)

Personal information
- Born: 23 June 2003 (age 23)

Sport
- Sport: Athletics
- Events: Shot put; Hammer throw

Achievements and titles
- Personal best(s): Shot put: 18.14m (2025) NR; Hammer: 52.22m (2025) NR
Medal record
Women's athletics
Representing Dominica
Junior Pan American Games
Gold medal – first place	2025 Asunción	Shot put
CARIFTA Games (U20)
Gold medal – first place	2022 Kingston	Shot put

Treneese Hamilton (born 23 June 2003) is a Dominican shot putter and hammer thrower. She holds the national record in both events.

== Early and personal life ==
Hamilton is from Canefield and is from a sporting family, her parents, Derrickson and Jasmine Hamilton, are former basketball and netball players respectively. She was coached by her cousin Joel Hamilton. She attended Massacre Canefield Primary school and Dominica State College where she studied biology. She later studied in the United States at Barton Community College and then the University of Alabama.

== Career ==
Hamilton set a personal best of 13.22 metres to place ninth in the shot put at the 2021 World Athletics U20 Championships in Nairobi, Kenya in August 2021. She won a gold medal at the 2022 CARIFTA Games in the shot put, with her best throw being 14.58 metres. She placed sixth overall in the shot put at the 2022 World Athletics U20 Championships in Cali, Colombia, with a best throw of 15.78 metres.

Competing for Alabama, she won the SEC Championships in 2025 and was a finalist the NCAA Championships, both indoors and outdoors.

She placed seventh in the shot put at the NACAC Championships in Freeport, The Bahamas in August 2025. She was a gold medalist at the 2025 Junior Pan American Games in Asunción, Paraguay later that month, the first gold medal for Dominica at the Games. She competed at the 2025 World Athletics Championships in Tokyo, Japan.
