= British Virgin Islands at the 2025 Junior Pan American Games =

- IOC code: IVB
- NOC: British Virgin Islands Olympic Committee

in Asunción, Paraguay
- Competitors: 3 in 1 sport
- Medals Ranked =30th: Gold 0 Silver 1 Bronze 1 Total 2

Junior Pan American Games appearances (overview)
- 2021; 2025

The British Virgin Islands is competing at the 2025 Junior Pan American Games in Asunción from August 9 to 23, 2025.

The Virgin Islander team consists of 3 athletes in 1 sport.

== Medals by sport ==
Sport	Gold	Silver	Bronze	Total
Athletics	0	1	1	2
Totals (1 entries)	0	1	1	2

== Medalists ==
The following British Virgin Islander competitors won medals at the games.

Medal	Name	Sport	Event	Date
Silver	Jaleel Croal	Athletics	Men's 200m	August 21
Bronze	Jaleel Croal	Athletics	Men's 100m	August 19

== See also ==
- British Virgin Islands at the Junior Pan American Games
