= Jaleel Croal =

British Virgin Island athlete (born 2003)

Personal information
- Nationality: British Virgin Islands
- Born: 13 March 2003 (age 23) British Virgin Islands

Sport
- Sport: Athletics
- Event: Sprint

Achievements and titles
- Personal bests: 60 m: 6.85 (Birmingham, 2024); 100 m: 10.08 (Jacksonville, 2025); 200 m: 19.95 (Jacksonville, 2025) NR
Medal record
Men's athletics
Representing British Virgin Islands
Junior Pan American Games
Silver medal – second place	2025 Asunción	200 m
Bronze medal – third place	2025 Asunción	100 m

Jaleel Croal (born 13 March 2003) is a sprinter from the British Virgin Islands. He is the national record holder over 200 metres.

== Biography ==
Croal is from the island of Tortola on the British Virgin Islands. He won the U17 200 metres at the 2019 CARIFTA Games in the Cayman Islands in April 2019. He lowered his personal best for the 200 metres to 20.93 seconds at the 2021 Junior Pan American Games in Cali, Colombia.

Competing for the University of South Florida he set a national record and meet record for the 200 metres with a time of 20.28 seconds at the 2025 American Athletic Conference Outdoor Championships. He ran a new personal best and new national record, and broke the 20-second barrier for the 200 metres for the first time, in running 19.95 seconds in Jacksonville in May 2025. He was a semi-finalist over 200 metres at the 2025 NCAA Outdoor Championships in Eugene, Oregon, the following month.

He was selected in the British Virgin Islands team for the 2025 Junior Pan American Games in Asunción, Paraguay. At the Games, he won the silver medal in the 200 metres and the bronze medal in the 100 metres. In September 2025, he competed in the 200 metres at the 2025 World Championships in Tokyo, Japan.

In June 2026, he qualified for the 200 metres at the 2026 NCAA Outdoor Championships. In July, he was a semi-finalist in the 200 metres at the 2026 Commonwealth Games in Glasgow, Scotland. He also competed in the 100 metres at the Games without advancing to the semi-finals.
