= Junior Pan American Games =

Multi-sport event of the Americas

- 2021; 2025

Junior Pan American Games
- Purpose: Multi-sport event for youth athletes in the Americas
- Frequency: Every four years
- Inaugurated: 2021 Junior Pan American Games in Cali-Valle, Colombia
- Most recent: 2025 Junior Pan American Games in Asunción, Paraguay
- Next event: 2029 Junior Pan American Games in Rosario, Argentina

The Junior Pan American Games are a multi-sport event held every four years among youth athletes from all over the American continent. The Games have been organized by Panam Sports. This event, inspired by the Youth Olympic Games, is exclusively for athletes under 21 years of age, with fewer infrastructure requirements and costs than the Pan American Games.

The last games were held in Asunción, Paraguay, in 2025, and the next games will take place in Rosario, Argentina, in 2029.

== History ==
On 16 January 2019, PASO announced the creation of the Junior Pan American Games.

Panam Sports accepted candidate cities for the first edition of the Games until 31 January. Cali, Colombia; Santa Ana, El Salvador; and Monterrey, Mexico, were accepted as candidate cities. Cali was chosen as the host city at the Executive Committee in San José, Costa Rica, on 27 March 2019.

Panam Sports chose Asunción, Paraguay to host for the 2025 Junior Pan American Games. Asunción received 32 out of 48 votes, while Santa Marta, Colombia, received the remaining 16 votes.

On April 1, 2026, Panam Sports announced they had received three candidacies for the 2029 Junior Pan American Games; Guatemala City, Panama City and Rosario, Argentina. The official candidate cities will be announced on June 19, and the host will be selected at the August Panam Sports General Assembly in Lima, Peru. However, Panama City withdraw its bid on 22 July 2026 before the Centro Caribe Sports General Assembly in Santo Domingo Dominican Republic ahead of the 2026 Central American and Caribbean Games opening ceremony, leaving Guatemala City and Rosario the two remaining bidders. On 28 August 2026, Rosario won the to host the 2029 edition by five votes with 29 votes out of 53 votes while Guatemala City received 24 votes.

== List of Junior Pan American Games editions ==
| Edition | Year | Host city | Host nation | Opened by | Start date | End date | Nations | Competitors | Sports | Events | Top placed team | Ref. |
|---|---|---|---|---|---|---|---|---|---|---|---|---|
| I | 2021 | Cali-Valle | Colombia | President Iván Duque | 25 November | 5 December | 41 | 2,540 | 28 | 321 | Brazil | |
| II | 2025 | Asunción | Paraguay | President Santiago Peña | 9 August | 23 August | 41 | 3,975 | 28 | 336 | Brazil | |
| III | 2029 | Rosario | Argentina | President of Argentina (expected) | TBA | TBA | Future event | | | | | |

== Sports ==
In the first edition of the games a total of 28 sports were contested, encompassing a total of 40 disciplines. In the second edition, BMX freestyle, field hockey, golf, open water swimming and rugby sevens were included on the games. Other Olympic events and disciplines not contested yet includes basketball (5x5), water polo, canoe slalom, equestrian, sport climbing, surfing and football.

| Sport | Years |
|---|---|
| 3x3 basketball | Since 2021 |
| Archery | Since 2021 |
| Artistic skating | Since 2021 |
| Artistic swimming | Since 2021 |
| Athletics | Since 2021 |
| Badminton | Since 2021 |
| Baseball | 2021 |
| Beach volleyball | Since 2021 |
| Bowling | 2021 |
| Boxing | 2021 |
| Canoeing | Since 2021 |
| Cycling | Since 2021 |
| Diving | Since 2021 |
| Fencing | Since 2021 |
| Field hockey | Since 2025 |
| Golf | Since 2025 |
| Gymnastics | Since 2021 |
| Handball | Since 2021 |
| Judo | Since 2021 |
| Karate | Since 2021 |

| Sport | Years |
|---|---|
| Modern pentathlon | 2021 |
| Open water swimming | Since 2025 |
| Rowing | Since 2021 |
| Rugby sevens | Since 2025 |
| Sailing | Since 2021 |
| Shooting | Since 2021 |
| Skateboarding | Since 2021 |
| Softball | 2021 |
| Speed skating | Since 2021 |
| Squash | Since 2021 |
| Swimming | Since 2021 |
| Table tennis | Since 2021 |
| Taekwondo | Since 2021 |
| Tennis | Since 2021 |
| Triathlon | Since 2021 |
| Volleyball | Since 2021 |
| Water skiing | Since 2025 |
| Weightlifting | Since 2021 |
| Wrestling | Since 2021 |

== Medal count ==
Last updated after the 2025 Junior Pan American Games

| Rank | Nation | Gold | Silver | Bronze | Total |
|---|---|---|---|---|---|
| 1 | Brazil | 129 | 99 | 111 | 339 |
| 2 | United States | 101 | 72 | 83 | 256 |
| 3 | Colombia | 96 | 61 | 103 | 260 |
| 4 | Mexico | 75 | 123 | 103 | 301 |
| 5 | Cuba | 48 | 32 | 37 | 117 |
| 6 | Argentina | 46 | 60 | 62 | 168 |
| 7 | Chile | 30 | 34 | 59 | 123 |
| 8 | Canada | 23 | 22 | 28 | 73 |
| 9 | Ecuador | 21 | 27 | 38 | 86 |
| 10 | Venezuela | 19 | 23 | 40 | 82 |
| 11 | Puerto Rico | 15 | 11 | 21 | 47 |
| 12 | Peru | 9 | 20 | 29 | 58 |
| 13 | Uruguay | 9 | 9 | 9 | 27 |
| 14 | Guatemala | 8 | 8 | 14 | 30 |
| 15 | Dominican Republic | 6 | 10 | 15 | 31 |
| 16 | Paraguay | 5 | 10 | 18 | 33 |
| 17 | Jamaica | 4 | 5 | 6 | 15 |
| 18 | Aruba | 3 | 2 | 0 | 5 |
| 19 | Costa Rica | 2 | 3 | 6 | 11 |
| 20 | Bolivia | 2 | 2 | 6 | 10 |
| 21 | Trinidad and Tobago | 1 | 3 | 9 | 13 |
| 22 | Nicaragua | 1 | 2 | 2 | 5 |
| 23 | Virgin Islands | 1 | 2 | 0 | 3 |
| 24 | Panama | 1 | 1 | 7 | 9 |
| 25 | Bahamas | 1 | 1 | 3 | 5 |
| 26 | Cayman Islands | 1 | 0 | 1 | 2 |
| 27 | Dominica | 1 | 0 | 0 | 1 |
| 27 | Haiti | 1 | 0 | 0 | 1 |
| 29 | El Salvador | 0 | 5 | 6 | 11 |
| 30 | Bermuda | 0 | 3 | 1 | 4 |
| 31 | Grenada | 0 | 2 | 1 | 3 |
| 32 | Guyana | 0 | 1 | 3 | 4 |
| 33 | Barbados | 0 | 1 | 1 | 2 |
| 33 | British Virgin Islands | 0 | 1 | 1 | 2 |
| 35 | Saint Kitts and Nevis | 0 | 1 | 0 | 1 |
| 36 | Honduras | 0 | 0 | 1 | 1 |
| 36 | Saint Lucia | 0 | 0 | 1 | 1 |
| 38 | Antigua and Barbuda | 0 | 0 | 0 | 0 |
| 38 | Belize | 0 | 0 | 0 | 0 |
| 38 | Saint Vincent and the Grenadines | 0 | 0 | 0 | 0 |
| 38 | Suriname | 0 | 0 | 0 | 0 |
| Totals (41 entries) | | 659 | 656 | 825 | 2,140 |

== See also ==
- Youth Olympic Games
- African Youth Games
- Asian Youth Games
- European Youth Olympic Festival
- South American Youth Games
- Bolivarian Youth Games
