= Brazil at the 2025 Junior Pan American Games =

- IOC code: BRA
- NOC: Brazilian Olympic Committee
- Website: www.cob.org.br

in Asunción, Paraguay 9 August 2025 – 23 August 2025
- Competitors: 360 in 34 sports
- Flag bearers (opening): Filipe Mota; Juliana Viana
- Flag bearers (closing): Matheus Pessanha; Lorrane Santos
- Officials: Leandro Guilheiro, chef de mission
- Medals Ranked 1st: Gold 70 Silver 50 Bronze 55 Total 175

Junior Pan American Games appearances (overview)
- 2021; 2025

Brazil competed in the 2025 Junior Pan American Games in Asunción, Paraguay from 9 to 23 August 2025.

The flag bearers at the opening ceremony were skateboarder Filipe Mota and badminton player Juliana Viana. Meanwhile, weightlifter Matheus Pessanha and canoeist Lorrane Santos were the country's flagbearers during the closing ceremony.

With a record number of medals at the end of the Junior Pan American Games, Brazil led the overall table with 175 medals, surpassing the Cali-Valle 2021 record with 70 gold medals, 50 silver medals and 55 bronze medals, also surpassing the record for gold medals, the number of direct spots per athlete and spots per sport for the 2027 Pan American Games.

== Medalists ==
The following Brazilian competitors won medals at the games. In the by discipline sections below, medalists' names are bolded.

Medal	Name	Sport	Event	Date
Gold	João Vinicius Ferreira; Daniel Passold	Rowing	Men's double sculls	August 10
Gold	Luiza Cocuzzi	Cycling	Women's cross-country	August 10
Gold	Clarice Ribeiro	Judo	Women's 48 kg	August 10
Gold	Rafaela Rodrigues	Judo	Women's 52 kg	August 10
Gold	Bruno Nóbrega	Judo	Men's 66 kg	August 10
Gold	Bianca Reis	Judo	Women's 57 kg	August 10
Gold	Stephan Steverink	Swimming	Men's 400 metre freestyle	August 10
Gold	Ana Julia Amaral	Swimming	Women's 200 metre butterfly	August 10
Gold	Gustavo Saldo	Swimming	Men's 200 metre butterfly	August 10
Gold	Julia Ariosa; Stephanie Balduccini; Beatriz Bezerra; Fernanda Celidônio; Ana Julia Amaral*; Carolina Daher*; Joice Otero*	Swimming	Women's 4 × 100 metre freestyle relay	August 10
Gold	Guilherme Caribé; Gabriel Machuco; Pedro Sansone; Davi Zanella; João Pierre Campos*; Lucio Flavio Filho*; Samuel Lopes*; Gabriel Moura*	Swimming	Men's 4 × 100 metre freestyle relay	August 10
Gold	Hussein Daruich	Shooting	Men's trap	August 11
Gold	Maria Lúcia Campos	Skateboarding	Women's street	August 11
Gold	Filipe Mota	Skateboarding	Men's street	August 11
Gold	Matheus Nolasco	Judo	Men's 73 kg	August 11
Gold	Eduarda Bastos	Judo	Women's 63 kg	August 11
Gold	Luan Almeida	Judo	Men's 81 kg	August 11
Gold	Stephanie Balduccini	Swimming	Women's 200 metre freestyle	August 11
Gold	Stephan Steverink	Swimming	Men's 200 metre freestyle	August 11
Gold	Joice Otero	Swimming	Women's 100 metre butterfly	August 11
Gold	Lúcio Flávio Filho	Swimming	Men's 100 metre butterfly	August 11
Gold	Guilherme Caribé; Pedro Sansone; Stephanie Balduccini; Beatriz Bezerra; Gabriel Moura*; Gustavo Saldo*; Julia Ariosa*; Carolina Daher*	Swimming	Mixed 4 × 100 metre freestyle relay	August 11
Gold	Lara Pizarro; Jennifer Silva	Rowing	Women's double sculls	August 12
Gold	Rafael Magalhães	Archery	Men's individual compound	August 12
Gold	Leonardo Oliveira; Miguel Pereira	Archery	Men's team recurve	August 12
Gold	Isabelle Estevez	Archery	Women's individual recurve	August 12
Gold	Jesse Barbosa	Judo	Men's 90 kg	August 12
Gold	Dandara Camillo	Judo	Women's 78 kg	August 12
Gold	Gustavo Milano	Judo	Men's 100 kg	August 12
Gold	Andrey Coelho	Judo	Men's +100 kg	August 12
Gold	Stephanie Balduccini	Swimming	Women's 100 metre freestyle	August 12
Gold	Guilherme Caribé	Swimming	Men's 100 metre freestyle	August 12
Gold	Agatha Amaral	Swimming	Women's 200 metre breaststroke	August 12
Gold	Letícia Romão	Swimming	Women's 800 metre freestyle	August 12
Gold	Stephan Steverink	Swimming	Men's 800 metre freestyle	August 12
Gold	Guilherme Camossato; Lúcio Flávio Filho; Stephanie Balduccini; Julia Karla Góes; Gustavo Saldo*; Davi Zanella*; Fernanda Celidônio*; Sophia Penteriche*	Swimming	Mixed 4 × 100 metre medley relay	August 12
Gold	Maria Luiza Albuquerque; Andriely Cichovicz; Júlia Colere; Amanda Manente; Alice Neves	Gymnastics	Women's rhythmic group 5 hoops	August 13
Gold	Lucas Takaki; Bruno Nóbrega; Matheus Nolasco; Luan Almeida; Jesse Barbosa; Gustavo Milano; Andrey Coelho; Clarice Ribeiro; Rafaela Rodrigues; Bianca Reis; Eduarda Bastos; Maria Eduarda Oliveira; Dandara Camillo; Ana Gabrielle Soares	Judo	Mixed team	August 13
Gold	Davi Silva; Juliana Viana	Badminton	Mixed doubles	August 13
Gold	Stephanie Balduccini	Swimming	Women's 50 metre freestyle	August 13
Gold	Guilherme Caribé	Swimming	Men's 50 metre freestyle	August 13
Gold	Stephan Steverink	Swimming	Men's 400 metre individual medley	August 13
Gold	Julia Ariosa; Stephanie Balduccini; Fernanda Celidônio; Carolina Daher; Mariana Costa*; Joice Otero*; Leticia de Paula*; Letícia Romão*	Swimming	Women's 4 × 200 metre freestyle relay	August 13
Gold	Gabriel Machuco; Gabriel Moura; Stephan Steverink; Davi Zanella	Swimming	Men's 4 × 200 metre freestyle relay	August 13
Gold	Letícia Romão	Swimming	Women's 1500 metre freestyle	August 14
Gold	João Pierre Campos	Swimming	Men's 1500 metre freestyle	August 14
Gold	Stephanie Balduccini; Julia Karla Góes; Nichelly Lysy; Joice Otero	Swimming	Women's 4 × 100 metre medley relay	August 14
Gold	Brazil women's national under-23 volleyball team: Maria Clara Andrade; Letícia Araújo; Gabriela Carneiro; Maria Clara Carvalhaes; Julliana Vitoria Gandra; Stephany Morete; Ana Luiza Rüdiger; Camilly Salomé; Lívia dos Santos; Jaqueline Schmitz; Adria Julia da Silva; Heloise Soares	Volleyball	Women's tournament	August 15
Gold	Brazil women's national junior handball team: Eduarda Borges; Yasmin Ferreira; Luana Flores; Ryanne Gama; Samanta Hevelin; Sophia Kieling; Raquel Ladeia; Lorenna Loyane; Ana Julia Machado; Maria Clara Martins; Ana Karolina Nunes; Beatriz Rodrigues; Maria Eduarda Rodrigues; Nhauany Teixeira	Handball	Women's tournament	August 15
Gold	João Pedro Didoni Bonini	Tennis	Men's singles	August 16
Gold	Henrique Marques	Taekwondo	Men's 80 kg	August 16
Gold	Lucas Fonseca	Sailing	Men's Formula kite	August 17
Gold	Cibelle Jungblut	Open water swimming	Women's 10 kilometres	August 17
Gold	Guilherme Morais; Henrique Marques; Camilly Gosch	Taekwondo	Mixed team kyorugi	August 17
Gold	Brazil women's national under-21 rugby sevens team: Cláudia Beltran; Giovanna Braz; Geovanna Carvalho; Ariely Faria; Mariely Faria; Isabelle Gonçalves; Agatha Vitória Fernandes; Heloysa Macedo; Raylanne Nascimento; Mariana Neves; Maria Gabrieli Pereira; Letícia Pinheiro	Rugby sevens	Women's tournament	August 17
Gold	Beatriz Fiore; Karina Shiray	Table tennis	Women's doubles	August 18
Gold	Felipe Arado; Leonardo Iizulka	Table tennis	Men's doubles	August 18
Gold	Jadson Lima; Elias dos Santos; Bianca de Almeida; Júlia Ribeiro	Athletics	Mixed 4 × 400 metres relay	August 18
Gold	Sabrina Pena	Athletics	Women's 800 metres	August 19
Gold	Lorrane Santos	Canoeing	Women's C-1 500 metres	August 21
Gold	Pedro Henrique Silvestre	Gymnastics	Men's pommel horse	August 21
Gold	Felipe Arado; Leonardo Iizulka	Table tennis	Men's team	August 21
Gold	Andrey Nazário	Karate	Men's 84 kg	August 21
Gold	Erik Medziukevicius	Artistic skating	Men's free skating	August 22
Gold	Matheus Pessanha	Weightlifting	Men's 98 kg	August 22
Gold	Brazil men's national under-23 volleyball team: Guilherme Amorim; Matheus Bandini; Gustavo Cardoso; Maicon França; Juan Pablo Gama; Lucas Oishi; Marcos Junior Gonçalves; Gabriel Ostapechen; Thiery Nascimento; Samuel Neufeld; Witallo Oliveira; Pedro Henrique Souza	Volleyball	Men's tournament	August 22
Gold	Vinícius Galeno; Jadson Lima; Matheus Lima; Elias dos Santos	Athletics	Men's 4 × 400 metres relay	August 22
Gold	Lia Iwazaki	Artistic skating	Women's solo dance	August 22
Gold	Brazil men's national junior handball team: Emerson Alves; Vinicius Bertoldo; Diogo Borja; Thiago Cruz; Rafael Damião; Lucas Gabriel; Gabriel Gomes; Renan Iziquiel; João Vitor Lindoso; Mikael Lopes; Guilherme Maia; Juan Sebastião; Gabriel Silva; Vinicius Stache; Kayky Fernando	Handball	Men's tournament	August 22
Gold	Mateus Nunes; Lucas Espirito Santo	Canoeing	Men's C-2 1000 metres	August 23
Silver	Marcelo Almeida; João Vinicius Ferreira; Andrei Jessé; Miguel Marques; Daniel Passold; Kayki Siqueira; Arthur Veiga; Diogo Volkmann; Marcello Oliveira	Rowing	Men's eight	August 10
Silver	Caio Almeida	Shooting	Men's 10 metre air pistol	August 10
Silver	Letícia Romão	Swimming	Women's 400 metre freestyle	August 10
Silver	Guilherme Camossato	Swimming	Men's 100 metre breaststroke	August 10
Silver	Gabriel Moura	Swimming	Men's 200 metre butterfly	August 10
Silver	Maria Eduarda Oliveira	Judo	Women's 70 kg	August 11
Silver	Matheus Brandt	Fencing	Men's épée	August 11
Silver	Beatriz Bezerra	Swimming	Women's 100 metre butterfly	August 11
Silver	Samuel Lopes	Swimming	Men's 200 metre backstroke	August 11
Silver	Sophia Baptista; Isabelle Estevez	Archery	Women's team recurve	August 12
Silver	Laura Silva	Squash	Women's singles	August 12
Silver	Guilherme Camossato	Swimming	Men's 200 metre breaststroke	August 12
Silver	João Pierre Campos	Swimming	Men's 800 metre freestyle	August 12
Silver	Isabella Gomes; Julia Moreno; Lara Pizarro; Jennifer Silva	Rowing	Women's quadruple sculls	August 13
Silver	Marcelo Almeida; João Vinicius Ferreira; Daniel Passold; Arthur Veiga	Rowing	Men's quadruple sculls	August 13
Silver	Andrei Jessé; Miguel Marques; Kayki Rocha; Diogo Volkmann; Ana Júlia Ferreira; Maria Fuhrmann; Luiza Nazário; Giulia Renata; Marcello Oliveira	Rowing	Mixed eight	August 13
Silver	Sarah Mourão	Gymnastics	Women's rhythmic individual clubs	August 13
Silver	Sarah Mourão	Gymnastics	Women's rhythmic individual ribbon	August 13
Silver	Guilherme Kanzler	Swimming	Men's 400 metre individual medley	August 13
Silver	Juliana Viana	Badminton	Women's singles	August 13
Silver	Deivid Silva	Badminton	Men's singles	August 13
Silver	Matheus Melecchi	Swimming	Men's 1500 metre freestyle	August 14
Silver	Fernanda Celidônio	Swimming	Women's 200 metre individual medley	August 14
Silver	Stephan Steverink	Swimming	Men's 200 metre individual medley	August 14
Silver	Guilherme Camossato; Lúcio Flávio Filho; Samuel Lopes; Pedro Sansone; Gustavo Saldo*; Davi Zanella*	Swimming	Men's 4 × 100 metre medley relay	August 14
Silver	Matheus Gilliard	Taekwondo	Men's 58 kg	August 15
Silver	Matheus Melecchi	Open water swimming	Men's 10 kilometres	August 17
Silver	Leonardo Iizulka	Table tennis	Men's singles	August 18
Silver	Pedro Henrique Silvestre	Gymnastics	Men's artistic individual all-around	August 19
Silver	Vinícius Avancini	Athletics	Men's shot put	August 19
Silver	Mateus Nunes	Canoeing	Men's C-1 1000 metres	August 20
Silver	Isabel Aguilar; Kauany Aquino; Sophia Carvalho; Francine Oliveira	Gymnastics	Women's artistic team all-around	August 20
Silver	Matheus Lima	Athletics	Men's 400 metres hurdles	August 20
Silver	Ana Luísa Ferraz	Athletics	Women's heptathlon	August 20
Silver	Mateus Nunes	Canoeing	Men's C-1 500 metres	August 21
Silver	Barbara Amaral	Karate	Women's +68 kg	August 21
Silver	Beatriz Fiore; Karina Shiray	Table tennis	Women's team	August 21
Silver	Kauany Aquino	Gymnastics	Women's vault	August 21
Silver	Ana Beatriz Sales	Wrestling	Women's freestyle 50 kg	August 21
Silver	Lucas Menezes	Karate	Men's 75 kg	August 22
Silver	Maria Isabel Alvites	Karate	Women's 61 kg	August 22
Silver	Laura Guimarães	Artistic skating	Women's free skating	August 22
Silver	Erik Medziukevicius	Artistic skating	Men's solo dance	August 22
Silver	Mateus Alencar	Athletics	Men's 3000 metres steeplechase	August 22
Silver	Thiago Ornelas	Athletics	Men's 110 metres hurdles	August 22
Silver	Felipe Izidoro	Athletics	Men's triple jump	August 22
Silver	Andreas Lothar Kreiss	Athletics	Men's pole vault	August 22
Silver	Isac de Farias; Jonathan Menezes	Beach volleyball	Men's tournament	August 22
Silver	Gabriel de Sousa	Wrestling	Men's freestyle 125 kg	August 22
Silver	Maria do Livramento; Lorrane Santos	Canoeing	Women's C-2 500 metres	August 23
Bronze	Miguel Marques; Kayki Siqueira	Rowing	Men's coxless pair	August 10
Bronze	Eiki Yamauchi	Cycling	Men's cross-country	August 10
Bronze	Lucas Takaki	Judo	Men's 60 kg	August 10
Bronze	Marcus Pinto	Fencing	Men's sabre	August 10
Bronze	Leonardo Alcantara	Swimming	Men's 400 metre freestyle	August 10
Bronze	Andrei Jessé; Miguel Marques; Kayki Siqueira; Diogo Volkmann	Rowing	Men's coxless four	August 11
Bronze	Davi Henrique Sodré	Cycling	Men's BMX freestyle	August 11
Bronze	Ellen Mendes	Shooting	Women's trap	August 11
Bronze	Livia Burberry	Fencing	Women's foil	August 11
Bronze	Matheus João Mendes	Skateboarding	Men's street	August 11
Bronze	Ana Júlia Ferreira; Maria Fuhrmann; Isabella Gomes; Julia Moreno; Luiza Nazário; Lara Pizarro; Giulia Renata; Jennifer Silva; Kauanne Alves	Rowing	Women's eight	August 12
Bronze	Caio Almeida; Ana Beatriz Mariano	Shooting	Mixed team air pistol	August 12
Bronze	Hussein Daruich; Ellen Mendes	Shooting	Mixed team trap	August 12
Bronze	Sarah Mourão	Gymnastics	Women's rhythmic individual all-around	August 12
Bronze	Ana Beatriz Fraga	Fencing	Women's sabre	August 12
Bronze	Ana Gabrielle Soares	Judo	Women's +78 kg	August 12
Bronze	Maria Luiza Marcante	Gymnastics	Women's individual trampoline	August 12
Bronze	Maria Luiza Albuquerque; Andriely Cichovicz; Júlia Colere; Amanda Manente; Alice Neves	Gymnastics	Women's rhythmic group all-around	August 12
Bronze	Nichelly Lysy	Swimming	Women's 200 metre breaststroke	August 12
Bronze	Julia Karla Góes	Swimming	Women's 100 metre backstroke	August 12
Bronze	Marcelo Almeida	Rowing	Men's single sculls	August 13
Bronze	Sarah Mourão	Gymnastics	Women's rhythmic individual ball	August 13
Bronze	Maria Luiza Albuquerque; Andriely Cichovicz; Júlia Colere; Amanda Manente; Alice Neves	Gymnastics	Women's rhythmic group 5 club pairs	August 13
Bronze	Beatriz Bezerra	Swimming	Women's 50 metre freestyle	August 13
Bronze	Pedro Sansone	Swimming	Men's 50 metre freestyle	August 13
Bronze	Agatha Amaral	Swimming	Women's 400 metre individual medley	August 13
Bronze	Murilo Penteado; João Carlos Santos	Squash	Men's doubles	August 14
Bronze	Mariana Costa	Swimming	Women's 1500 metre freestyle	August 14
Bronze	Pedro Miguel Freitas; Luan Carlos Rodrigues	Cycling	Men's madison	August 15
Bronze	Ana Carolina Macedo	Taekwondo	Women's 57 kg	August 15
Bronze	Gustavo Albieri; Victor Winheski	Tennis	Men's doubles	August 15
Bronze	Heloá Camelo; Maria Carolina Postiglione	Diving	Women's synchronized 3 metre springboard	August 16
Bronze	Erick Vinicius Batista	Taekwondo	Men's +80 kg	August 16
Bronze	Felipe Arado; Karina Shiray	Table tennis	Mixed doubles	August 17
Bronze	Leonardo Macedo	Open water swimming	Men's 10 kilometres	August 17
Bronze	Gustavo Kiessling	Sailing	ILCA 7	August 17
Bronze	Thiago Lacerda	Athletics	Men's javelin throw	August 18
Bronze	Maria Eduarda de Matos	Athletics	Women's discus throw	August 18
Bronze	Alessandro Borges	Athletics	Men's shot put	August 19
Bronze	Lorrane Santos	Canoeing	Women's C-1 200 metres	August 20
Bronze	Júlia Visgueiro	Triathlon	Women's individual	August 20
Bronze	Lays Cristina Rodrigues	Athletics	Women's 100 metres hurdles	August 20
Bronze	Vinícius Galeno	Athletics	Men's 400 metres	August 20
Bronze	Luana Gabriela de Moura	Athletics	Women's pole vault	August 20
Bronze	Kauan Gomes	Wrestling	Men's Greco-Roman 87 kg	August 20
Bronze	Wesley Barros	Wrestling	Men's Greco-Roman 130 kg	August 20
Bronze	Ademilton Nogueira	Karate	Men's +84 kg	August 21
Bronze	Roberta Lopes	Karate	Women's 68 kg	August 21
Bronze	Bernardo Barreto; Eduarda Chagas	Artistic swimming	Mixed duet	August 22
Bronze	Leticia Kato	Karate	Women's 55 kg	August 22
Bronze	Isabel Aguilar	Gymnastics	Women's balance beam	August 22
Bronze	Max França	Wrestling	Men's freestyle 86 kg	August 22
Bronze	Pedro Henrique Silvestre	Gymnastics	Men's horizontal bars	August 22
Bronze	Mateus Torres	Athletics	Men's discus throw	August 22
Bronze	Cristhian Izaías	Weightlifting	Men's +98 kg	August 23

Medals by sport/discipline
Sport	1st place, gold medalist(s)	2nd place, silver medalist(s)	3rd place, bronze medalist(s)	Total
Swimming	24	12	7	**43**
Judo	12	1	2	**15**
Athletics	3	7	7	**17**
Table tennis	3	2	1	**6**
Archery	3	1	0	**4**
Gymnastics	2	5	7	**14**
Rowing	2	4	4	**10**
Canoeing	2	3	1	**6**
Artistic skating	2	2	0	**4**
Taekwondo	2	1	2	**5**
Skateboarding	2	0	1	**3**
Handball	2	0	0	**2**
Volleyball	2	0	0	**2**
Badminton	1	2	0	**3**
Shooting	1	1	3	**5**
Karate	1	3	3	**7**
Open water swimming	1	1	1	**3**
Cycling	1	0	3	**4**
Sailing	1	0	1	**2**
Tennis	1	0	1	**2**
Weightlifting	1	0	1	**2**
Rugby sevens	1	0	0	**1**
Wrestling	0	2	3	**5**
Fencing	0	1	3	**4**
Squash	0	1	1	**2**
Beach volleyball	0	1	0	**1**
Artistic swimming	0	0	1	**1**
Diving	0	0	1	**1**
Triathlon	0	0	1	**1**
Total	70	50	55	**175**

Medals by day
**Day**	1st place, gold medalist(s)	2nd place, silver medalist(s)	3rd place, bronze medalist(s)	**Total**
August 10	11	5	5	21
August 11	11	4	5	20
August 12	14	4	10	28
August 13	8	8	6	22
August 14	3	4	2	9
August 15	2	1	3	6
August 16	2	0	2	4
August 17	4	1	3	8
August 18	3	1	2	6
August 19	1	2	1	4
August 20	0	4	7	11
August 21	4	5	2	11
August 22	6	10	6	22
August 23	1	1	1	3
Total	70	50	55	**175**

Medals by gender
**Day**	1st place, gold medalist(s)	2nd place, silver medalist(s)	3rd place, bronze medalist(s)	**Total**
Male	35	30	26	91
Female	29	19	25	73
Mixed	6	1	4	11
Total	70	50	55	**175**

== Competitors ==
The following is the list of number of competitors participating at the Games per sport/discipline.

Sport	Men	Women	Total
Archery	3	3	6
Artistic skating	1	2	3
Artistic swimming	1	8	9
Athletics	30	23	53
Badminton	2	2	4
3x3 basketball	4	4	8
Beach volleyball	2	2	4
Canoeing	2	2	4
Cycling	6	7	13
Diving	4	2	6
Fencing	3	3	6
Field hockey	17	0	17
Golf	2	2	4
Gymnastics	6	13	19
Handball	15	14	29
Judo	7	7	14
Karate	3	4	7
Open water swimming	2*	2	4
Rowing	9	9	18
Rugby sevens	0	12	12
Sailing	2	2	4
Shooting	5	4	9
Skateboarding	2	2	4
Speed skating	1	0	1
Squash	3	3	6
Swimming	14*	14	28
Table tennis	2	2	4
Taekwondo	5	4	9
Tennis	3	3	6
Triathlon	2	2	4
Volleyball	12	12	24
Water skiing	2	2	4
Weightlifting	3	3	6
Wrestling	7	5	12
Total	181	179	360

- Matheus Melecchi competed in both swimming and open water swimming.

== Archery ==
Brazil qualified a team of six archers (three men and three women) through the Junior Pan American Archery Qualifiers in Buenos Aires, Argentina. The team was officially named on June 9, 2025.

Men

Athlete	Event	Ranking Round		Round of 32	Round of 16	Quarterfinals	Semifinals	Final / BM	Rank
Athlete	Event	Score	Seed	Opposition Score	Opposition Score	Opposition Score	Opposition Score	Opposition Score	Rank
Leonardo Oliveira	Individual recurve	642	5	Bye	Cueto (MEX); W 6–4	Hernández (COL); L 0–6	Did not advance		
Miguel Pereira	Individual recurve	597	18	Pacheco (VEN); L 2–6	Did not advance				
Rafael Magalhães	Individual compound	684	5	—N/a	Romero (PAR); W 144–128	Villegas (COL); W 147–144	Tillit (GUA); W 142–140	Méndez (MEX); W 144–142	1st place, gold medalist(s)
Leonardo Oliveira; Miguel Pereira	Team recurve	1239	4	—N/a		Argentina; W 5–1	Colombia; W 6–0	Guatemala; W 6–0	1st place, gold medalist(s)

Women

Athlete	Event	Ranking Round		Round of 32	Round of 16	Quarterfinals	Semifinals	Final / BM	Rank
Athlete	Event	Score	Seed	Opposition Score	Opposition Score	Opposition Score	Opposition Score	Opposition Score	Rank
Sophia Baptista	Individual recurve	598	8	Bye	Selley (BER); W 7–3	Nakatani (PAR); W 6–0	Hawash (CAN); L 4–6	Bronze medal final Pueyo (ARG); L 0–6	4
Isabelle Estevez	Individual recurve	639	3	Bye	Urrego (COL); W 7–1	Oliver (CAN); W 6–0	Pueyo (ARG); W 6–2	Hawash (CAN); W 6–2	1st place, gold medalist(s)
Fernanda Waib	Individual compound	654	9	—N/a	Domínguez (CUB); L 139^{9}–139^{9+} SO	Did not advance			
Sophia Baptista; Isabelle Estevez	Team recurve	1237	1	—N/a		Bye	Colombia; W 5–4 SO	Mexico; L 4–5 SO	2nd place, silver medalist(s)

Mixed

Athlete	Event	Ranking Round		Round of 16	Quarterfinals	Semifinals	Final / BM	Rank
Athlete	Event	Score	Seed	Opposition Score	Opposition Score	Opposition Score	Opposition Score	Rank
Leonardo Oliveira; Isabelle Estevez	Team recurve	1281	2	Paraguay; W 6–0	Bermuda; L 3–5	Did not advance		
Rafael Magalhães; Fernanda Waib	Team compound	1338	8	Argentina; W 150–143	Mexico; L 148–155	Did not advance		

== Artistic swimming ==
Brazil qualified a full team of nine artistic swimmers (one men and eight women) through the 2025 Pan American Aquatics Championships in Medellín, Colombia.

Athlete	Event	Technical Routine		Free Routine		Acrobatic Routine		Total	
Athlete	Event	Points	Rank	Points	Rank	Points	Rank	Points	Rank
Eduarda Chagas; Hannah Sukman	Women's duet	229.7967	5	180.0842	7	—N/a		409.8809	7
Bernardo Barreto; Eduarda Chagas	Mixed duet	167.4283	3	216.5150	3	—N/a		383.9433	3rd place, bronze medalist(s)
Bernardo Barreto; Eduarda Chagas; Julia Godinho; Manuela Marques; Maria Julia Stramandinoli; Hannah Sukman; Julia Tomelin; Isabella Viana; Isabella Zanata	Team	213.2050	5	188.9167	5	142.0608	4	544.1825	5

== Athletics ==
Brazil qualified a full team of 53 athletes (30 men and 23 women) either by passing the direct qualifying mark (or time for track and road races) or by world ranking in the following events (a maximum of two athletes each). On June 2, 2025, the Brazilian Athletics Confederation announced the main team of track and field athletes.

Key

- Note–Ranks given for track events are within the athlete's heat only
- Q = Qualified for the next round
- q = Qualified for the next round as a fastest loser
- Bye = Athlete not required to compete in round

Men

Track & road events

Athlete	Event	Semifinal		Final	
Athlete	Event	Result	Rank	Result	Rank
Matheus Oliveira	100 m	10.52	4	Did not advance	
Renan Gallina	200 m	21.23	5	Did not advance	
Vinícius Galeno	400 m	46.44	3 Q	45.83	3rd place, bronze medalist(s)
Jadson Lima	400 m	46.93	4 q	46.50	6
Jânio Marcos Varjão	800 m	1:49.79 (.787)	2 Q	2:03.04	8
Marco Túlio Gonçalves	800 m	1:51.41	3 Q	1:49.29 SB	4
Jânio Marcos Varjão	1500 m	—N/a		3:52.98	9
Vinícius Alves	5000 m	—N/a		14:40.32	6
Jânio Marcos Varjão	5000 m	—N/a		14:32.13	4
José Eduardo Mendes	110 m hurdles	13.99	3 Q	13.84	4
Thiago Ornelas	110 m hurdles	13.77	1 Q	13.61	2nd place, silver medalist(s)
Matheus Lima	400 m hurdles	48.23 JPR	1 Q	49.28	2nd place, silver medalist(s)
Caio Vinícius Silva	400 m hurdles	52.59	5	Did not advance	
Mateus Alencar	3000 m steeplechase	—N/a		8:57.82 PB	2nd place, silver medalist(s)
Vinícius Alves	3000 m steeplechase	—N/a		9:06.36	4
Renan Gallina; Lucas Nunes; Matheus Oliveira; Thamer Villar	4 × 100 m relay	—N/a		39.76	5
Vinícius Galeno; Jadson Lima; Matheus Lima; Elias dos Santos	4 × 400 m relay	—N/a		3:03.76 JPR	1st place, gold medalist(s)
Edson de Aguiar	20 km walk	—N/a		1:29:36.66 PB	8

Field events

Athlete	Event	Final	
Athlete	Event	Distance	Position
Andreas Lothar Kreiss	Pole vault	5.10	2nd place, silver medalist(s)
Aurélio Miguel Leite	Pole vault	4.80	5
Matheus Aparecido	Long jump	7.01	8
Gabriel Luiz Boza	Long jump	6.82	11
Felipe Izidoro	Triple jump	16.74 PB	2nd place, silver medalist(s)
Vinícius Avancini	Shot put	18.31 PB	2nd place, silver medalist(s)
Alessandro Borges	Shot put	17.97 PB	3rd place, bronze medalist(s)
Mateus Torres	Discus throw	58.73 PB	3rd place, bronze medalist(s)
Alberto Rodrigues	Discus throw	52.53 SB	8
Eduardo Fernandes	Hammer throw	64.45 PB	7
Marcos Roberto Lopes	Hammer throw	55.73	10
Arthur Curvo	Javelin throw	65.32	8
Thiago Lacerda	Javelin throw	69.77	3rd place, bronze medalist(s)

Combined events – Decathlon

Athlete	Event	100 m	LJ	SP	HJ	400 m	110H	DT	PV	JT	1500 m	Final	Rank
Luiz Arthur Caetano	Result	11.39	6.99	11.71	2.03	50.31	15.79	33.93	3.90	43.12	5:18.59	6640	5
Luiz Arthur Caetano	Points	776	811	589	831	800	757	542	590	487	457	6640	5

Women

Track & road events

Athlete	Event	Semifinal		Final	
Athlete	Event	Result	Rank	Result	Rank
Daniele Campigotto	200 m	24.37	5	Did not advance	
Júlia Ribeiro	400 m	54.30	3 Q	53.63	4
Luise Rosa Braga	800 m	—N/a		2:10.11 SB	7
Sabrina Pena	800 m	—N/a		2:05.87 JPR	1st place, gold medalist(s)
Luise Rosa Braga	1500 m	—N/a		4:32.06	8
Sabrina Pena	1500 m	—N/a		4:37.60	10
Luisa de Almeida	10,000 m	—N/a		40:53.66	11
Isabele Carlos	10,000 m	—N/a		38:49.85	8
Lays Cristina Rodrigues	100 m hurdles	13.43	2 Q	13.60	3rd place, bronze medalist(s)
Pietra Simões	100 m hurdles	13.57 (.561) PB	3 q	13.81	5
Amanda Miranda	400 m hurdles	DNS		Did not advance	
Camille de Oliveira	400 m hurdles	Bye		59.08	4
Aylana Ferreira	3000 m steeplechase	—N/a		12:06.24	8
Daniele Campigotto; Lays Cristina Rodrigues; Vanessa Sena; Pietra Simões	4 × 100 m relay	—N/a		45.72	4
Bianca de Almeida; Camille de Oliveira; Sabrina Pena; Júlia Ribeiro	4 × 400 m relay	—N/a		3:38.75	4

Field events

Athlete	Event	Final	
Athlete	Event	Distance	Position
Maria Eduarda Barbosa	High jump	1.79 SB	=4
Arielly Monteiro	High jump	1.73	6
Júlia Calabretti	Pole vault	3.80	5
Luana Gabriela de Moura	Pole vault	3.90	3rd place, bronze medalist(s)
Vanessa Sena	Long jump	6.10	6
Taniele Jesus da Silva	Shot put	14.08	7
Maria Eduarda de Matos	Discus throw	53.21 PB	3rd place, bronze medalist(s)
Samanta Santos	Discus throw	46.85	10
Agnys Ribeiro	Hammer throw	56.44	9
Stefany Beatriz Navarro	Javelin throw	40.54	8

Combined events – Heptathlon

Athlete	Event	100H	HJ	SP	200 m	LJ	JT	800 m	Final	Rank
Ana Luísa Ferraz	Result	13.58	1.60	11.84	24.77	5.82	32.60	2:17.82	5508	2nd place, silver medalist(s)
Ana Luísa Ferraz	Points	1039	736	651	908	795	526	853	5508	2nd place, silver medalist(s)
Tainara Mess	Result	14.03	1.60	13.23	DNF	DNS			2453	8
Tainara Mess	Points	974	736	743	0	DNS			2453	8

Mixed

Track events

Athlete	Event	Final	
Athlete	Event	Result	Rank
Jadson Lima; Elias dos Santos; Bianca de Almeida; Júlia Ribeiro	4 × 400 m relay	3:19.98	1st place, gold medalist(s)

== Badminton ==
Brazil qualified a full team of four badminton players (two men and two women) by virtue of their BWF world rankings. The team was officially named on June 7, 2025.

Men

Athlete	Event	Round of 32	Round of 16	Quarterfinals	Semifinals	Final / BM	
Athlete	Event	Opposition Result	Opposition Result	Opposition Result	Opposition Result	Opposition Result	Rank
Davi Silva	Singles	Castillo (ESA); W 21–8, 21–10	Motto (ARG); W 21–8, 21–14	Lai (CAN); L 9–21, 9–21	Did not advance		
Deivid Silva	Singles	Torres (VEN); W 21–6, 21–3	McBean (JAM); W 21–14, 21–10	Alvarez (GUA); W 19–21, 21–15, 21–9	Aguirre (PER); W 21–15, 21–12	Lai (CAN); L 6–21, 21–23	2nd place, silver medalist(s)

Women

Athlete	Event	Round of 32	Round of 16	Quarterfinals	Semifinals	Final / BM	
Athlete	Event	Opposition Result	Opposition Result	Opposition Result	Opposition Result	Opposition Result	Rank
Juliana Murosaki	Singles	Vasquez (PER); W 16–21, 22–20, 21–11	Gualdi (ARG); W 21–13, 13–21, 21–16	Contreras (MEX); L 18–21, 9–21	Did not advance		
Juliana Viana	Singles	Mercado (PUR); W 21–2, 21–3	Dominguez (PAR); W 21–0, 21–3	Araujo (VEN); W 21–4, 21–2	Lin (USA); W 21–13, 21–8	Chan (CAN); L 12–21, 16–21	2nd place, silver medalist(s)

Mixed

Athlete	Event	Round of 32	Round of 16	Quarterfinals	Semifinals	Final / BM	
Athlete	Event	Opposition Result	Opposition Result	Opposition Result	Opposition Result	Opposition Result	Rank
Davi Silva; Juliana Viana	Doubles	Debidin / Berkley (GUY); W WDR	Bisphan / Zeegelaar (SUR); W 21–6, 21–6	Aguirre / Vasquez (PER); W 21–13, 21–15	Xu / Lin (USA); W 21–13, 13–21, 21–15	Lai / Chan (CAN); W 23–21, 14–21, 21–19	1st place, gold medalist(s)
Deivid Silva; Juliana Murosaki	Doubles	Alas / Cativo (ESA); W 21–12, 21–9	Motto / Gualdi (ARG); W 21–11, 24–22	Zhang / Chang (USA); L 17–21, 17–21	Did not advance		

== Basketball ==
=== 3x3 ===
Brazil qualified a men's and women's team of 4 athletes each (8 athletes in total).

Summary

Team	Event	Preliminary round			Quarterfinal	Semifinal	Final / BM / Pl.	
Team	Event	Opposition Result	Opposition Result	Rank	Opposition Result	Opposition Result	Opposition Result	Rank
Brazil men's	Men's tournament	Canada; L 13–21	Puerto Rico; L 17–20	3	Did not advance			
Brazil women's	Women's tournament	Guatemala; W 21–8	Mexico; L 14–15	2 Q	Chile; W 19–18 (OT)	Canada; L 10–13	Bronze medal match Paraguay; L 15–16 (OT)	4

==== Men's tournament ====
Brazil qualified a men's team (of 4 athletes) by virtue of their FIBA 3x3 world rankings.

Roster

The men's team roster of 8 athletes was officially announced on April 28, 2025. The final roster was revealed on August 1, 2025.

Head coach: Thiago de Sordi

- 1 Gabriel Silva
- 2 Emanuel Fernandes
- 7 Arthur Oliveira
- 11 João Nicolas Kopper (c)

Preliminary round

Pos	Team	Pld	W	L	PF	PA	PD	Qualification
1	Puerto Rico	2	2	0	41	37	+4	Quarterfinals
2	Canada	2	1	1	41	34	+7	Quarterfinals
3	Brazil	2	0	2	30	41	−11	

Source: Report
Rules for classification: 1) Wins; 2) Head-to-head record; 3) Points scored.

15 August 2025
19:20

Report

Brazil	13–21	Canada
Pts: Fernandes 8		Pts: Sam 8

Olympic Training Centre, Luque
Referees: Fernando Obreque (CHI) / Sonia Maldonado (PUR)

16 August 2025
13:00

Report

Puerto Rico	20–17	Brazil
Pts: Tirado 8		Pts: Fernandes 8

Olympic Training Centre, Luque
Referees: Fernando Obreque (CHI) / Gonzalo Paz Chiapponi (URU)

==== Women's tournament ====
Brazil qualified a women's team (of 4 athletes) by virtue of their FIBA 3x3 world rankings.

Roster

The women's team roster of 8 athletes was officially announced on April 28, 2025. The final roster was revealed on August 1, 2025.

Head coach: Elen Rosa

- 10 Vitória Moura
- 11 Brenda Bleidão
- 13 Arianny Francisco
- 23 Stephany Gonçalves (c)

Preliminary round

Pos	Team	Pld	W	L	PF	PA	PD	Qualification
1	Mexico	2	2	0	36	18	+18	Quarterfinals
2	Brazil	2	1	1	35	23	+12	Quarterfinals
3	Guatemala	2	0	2	12	42	−30	

Source: Report
Rules for classification: 1) Wins; 2) Head-to-head record; 3) Points scored.

15 August 2025
18:00

Report

Brazil	21–8	Guatemala
Pts: Moura 9		Pts: Escobar 3

Olympic Training Centre, Luque
Referees: Fernando Obreque (CHI) / María Fernanda Olivieri (ARG)

16 August 2025
12:00

Report

Mexico	15–14	Brazil
Pts: Jeffries 7		Pts: Moura 6

Olympic Training Centre, Luque
Referees: Sonia Maldonado (PUR) / Katiuska Marchant (CHI)

Quarterfinal

16 August 2025
16:00

Report

Chile	18–19 (OT)	Brazil
Pts: Ovalle 13		Pts: Moura 8

Olympic Training Centre, Luque
Referees: Sonia Maldonado (PUR) / Cynthia Pamela Nuñez (DOM)

Semifinal

17 August 2025
12:00

Report

Brazil	10–13	Canada
Pts: Moura 4		Pts: Smith 5

Olympic Training Centre, Luque
Referees: Katiuska Marchant (CHI) / María Fernanda Olivieri (ARG)

Bronze medal game

17 August 2025
18:20

Report

Brazil	15–16 (OT)	Paraguay
Pts: Francisco 7		Pts: Brítez 10

Olympic Training Centre, Luque
Referees: Sonia Maldonado (PUR) / Cynthia Pamela Nuñez (DOM)

== Canoeing ==
=== Sprint ===
Brazil qualified a total of four canoeists (two men and two women) at the 2025 Pan American Junior and U23 Canoe Sprint Championships in Montevideo, Uruguay. The team was officially named on August 8, 2025.

Men

Athlete	Event	Heat		Semifinal		Final	
Athlete	Event	Time	Rank	Time	Rank	Time	Rank
Mateus Nunes	C-1 500 m	—N/a				1:51.44	2nd place, silver medalist(s)
Mateus Nunes	C-1 1000 m	—N/a				4:23.98	2nd place, silver medalist(s)
Mateus Nunes; Lucas Espirito Santo	C-2 1000 m	—N/a				2:04.46	1st place, gold medalist(s)

Women

Athlete	Event	Heat		Semifinal		Final	
Athlete	Event	Time	Rank	Time	Rank	Time	Rank
Lorrane Santos	C-1 200 m	52.89	2 FA	Bye		50.67	3rd place, bronze medalist(s)
Lorrane Santos	C-1 500 m	2:15.31	1 FA	Bye		2:12.59	1st place, gold medalist(s)
Maria do Livramento; Lorrane Santos	C-2 500 m	—N/a				2:26.99	2nd place, silver medalist(s)

Mixed

Athlete	Event	Final	
Athlete	Event	Time	Rank
Lucas Espirito Santo; Lorrane Santos	C-2 500 m	2:30.49	6

Qualification Legend: FA = Qualify to final (medal); FB = Qualify to final B (non-medal); SF = Qualified to Semifinal

== Cycling ==
Brazil qualified a total of 13 cyclists (six men and seven women). The team was officially named on July 16, 2025.

=== BMX ===
Freestyle

Brazil qualified a team of two freestyle riders (one man and one woman) by virtue of their UCI elite individual world rankings.

Athlete	Event	Qualification				Final			
Athlete	Event	Run 1	Run 2	Average	Rank	Run 1	Run 2	Best	Rank
Davi Henrique Sodré	Men's	74.67	68.33	71.50	3 Q	61.33	79.67	79.67	3rd place, bronze medalist(s)
Luna Navarro	Women's	24.33	26.67	25.50	8 Q	22.33	21.00	22.33	7

Racing

Brazil qualified a team of three BMX racers (one men and two women) by virtue of their UCI under-23 and junior world rankings.

Athlete	Event	Ranking round		Quarterfinal		Semifinal		Final	
Athlete	Event	Time	Rank	Points	Rank	Points	Rank	Time	Rank
Lucas Zimmermann	Men's	33.820	4 Q	8	1 Q	7	2 Q	35.873	5
Isabella Franco	Women's	DNS		Did not advance					
Mayra Monroy	Women's	43.294	15 Q	15	5	Did not advance			

=== Mountain biking ===
Brazil qualified a team of three mountain bikers (one man and two women) at the 2025 XCO Pan American U23 Mountain Biking Championships in San José, Costa Rica.

Athlete	Event	Time	Rank
Eiki Yamauchi	Men's cross-country	1:17:58	3rd place, bronze medalist(s)
Luiza Cocuzzi	Women's cross-country	1:17:55	1st place, gold medalist(s)
Giuliana Morgen	Women's cross-country	DNF	

=== Road ===
Brazil qualified a team of three male road cyclists at the 2025 Pan American Road Cycling Championships in Punta del Este, Uruguay.

Men

Athlete	Event	Time	Rank
Luiz Fernando Bomfim	Road race	3:23:26	9
Pedro Miguel Freitas	Road race	DNF	
Luan Carlos Rodrigues	Road race	DNF	
Luiz Fernando Bomfim	Time trial	52:04.73	11
Luan Carlos Rodrigues	Time trial	52:01.59	10

=== Track ===
Brazil qualified a team of four track cyclists (two men and two women) at the 2025 Pan American Track Cycling Championships in Asunción, Paraguay.

Madison

Athlete	Event	Laps	Points	Rank
Pedro Miguel Freitas; Luan Carlos Rodrigues	Men's	0	19	3rd place, bronze medalist(s)
Ana Júlia Alves; Ana Paula Finco	Women's	–40	–40	6

Omnium

Athlete	Event	Scratch race		Tempo race		Elimination race		Points race		Total	
Athlete	Event	Points	Rank	Points	Rank	Points	Rank	Points	Rank	Points	Rank
Luan Carlos Rodrigues	Men's	40	1	26	8	32	5	–5	8	93	8
Ana Paula Finco	Women's	30	6	40	1	34	4	2	5	106	5

== Diving ==
Brazil qualified a full team of six divers (four men and two women) through the 2025 Pan American Aquatics Championships in Medellín, Colombia.

Men

Athlete	Event	Preliminary		Final	
Athlete	Event	Score	Rank	Score	Rank
Miguel Cardoso	1 m springboard	276.05	12 Q	304.80	11
Rafael Max	1 m springboard	320.40	7 Q	328.10	9
Gabriel Perdigão	3 m springboard	282.25	13	Did not advance	
Rafael Max	3 m springboard	360.05	5 Q	354.50	9
Gabriel Perdigão	10 m platform	306.45	9 Q	280.75	10
Miguel Cardoso; Rafael Max	3 m synchronized springboard	—N/a		330.45	5
Miguel Cardoso; Caio Dalmaso	10 m synchronized platform	—N/a		341.13	4

Women

Athlete	Event	Preliminary		Final	
Athlete	Event	Score	Rank	Score	Rank
Heloá Camelo	1 m springboard	196.95	9 Q	208.40	10
Maria Carolina Postiglione	1 m springboard	222.15	7 Q	231.70	6
Heloá Camelo	3 m springboard	203.90	8 Q	204.30	9
Maria Carolina Postiglione	3 m springboard	213.15	6 Q	210.75	8
Heloá Camelo	10 m platform	210.70	9 Q	178.55	11
Heloá Camelo; Maria Carolina Postiglione	3 m synchronized springboard	—N/a		222.36	3rd place, bronze medalist(s)

== Fencing ==
Brazil qualified a full team of six fencers (three men and three women) at the 2025 Pan American Cadets and Juniors Fencing Championships in Asunción, Paraguay. The team was officially named on March 17, 2025.

Men

Athlete	Event	Pool Round		Round of 16	Quarterfinals	Semifinals	Final	
Athlete	Event	Victories	Seed	Opposition Score	Opposition Score	Opposition Score	Opposition Score	Rank
Matheus Brandt	Individual épée	3V–1D	1 Q	Sanchez (PUR); W 15–8	Groupierre (ARG); W 15–10	Gao (USA); W 15–8	Schembri (ISV); L 7–15	2nd place, silver medalist(s)
Giorgio Fumagalli	Individual foil	1V–3D	4 Q	Restovic (CHI); L 12–15	Did not advance			
Marcus Pinto	Individual sabre	3V–1D	1 Q	Gallardo (PAR); W 15–12	Vargas (COL); W 15–12	Lim (USA); L 14–15	Did not advance	3rd place, bronze medalist(s)

Women

Athlete	Event	Pool Round		Round of 16	Quarterfinals	Semifinals	Final	
Athlete	Event	Victories	Seed	Opposition Score	Opposition Score	Opposition Score	Opposition Score	Rank
Laura Correia	Individual épée	2V–2D	3 Q	Waller (PUR); W 15–7	Paredes (MEX); L 14–15	Did not advance		
Livia Burberry	Individual foil	3V–1D	2 Q	Mercado (BOL); W 15–6	Sticconi (ARG); W 15–9	Yang (USA); L 7–15	Did not advance	3rd place, bronze medalist(s)
Ana Beatriz Fraga	Individual sabre	3V–1D	2 Q	Castillo (PAR); W 15–11	Jimenez (VEN); W 15–13	Borrelli (ARG); L 14–15	Did not advance	3rd place, bronze medalist(s)

== Field hockey ==
Brazil qualified a men's team of 18 athletes.

Key:

- P – Match decided by penalty-shootout.

Summary

Team	Event	Group stage				Semifinal	Final / BM / Pl.	
Team	Event	Opposition Result	Opposition Result	Opposition Result	Rank	Opposition Result	Opposition Result	Rank
Brazil men's	Men's tournament	Argentina; L 0–11	Paraguay; D 1–1	United States; L 2–3	3	5th–8th place classification Trinidad and Tobago; W 5–4	Fifth place match Mexico; L 0–4	6

=== Men's tournament ===
Brazil qualified a men's team (of 18 athletes) by finishing second at the 2025 Men's Junior Pan American Challenge in Bridgetown, Barbados.

Roster

The men's team of 16 athletes was officially named on July 30, 2025. Additionally, Leonardo Santos and Gustavo da Silva were named as traveling reserves.

Head coach: Claudio Rocha

- 5 Matheus Nascimento
- 6 Frederico Sauerbronn
- 7 Victor de Godoy
- 9 Henrique da Silva
- 10 Luiz Guilherme Martins
- 11 Lucas Varela (c)
- 15 Kris Kaspian
- 17 Francisco Buzatto
- 18 Gustavo Felinto
- 19 Pedro Henrique Cruz
- 21 Murilo Xavier
- 22 Luigi Lunardi
- 23 Gabriel Luiz Moreira
- 25 João Pedro Santos
- 31 Christopher Cauvain
- 32 Bento Caria GK
- 2 Gustavo da Silva

Pool A

Pos	Team	Pld	W	D	L	GF	GA	GD	Pts	Qualification
1	Argentina	3	3	0	0	39	0	+39	9	Semi-finals
2	United States	3	2	0	1	9	11	−2	6	Semi-finals
3	Brazil	3	0	1	2	3	15	−12	1	
4	Paraguay (H)	3	0	1	2	2	27	−25	1	

Source: FIH
Rules for classification: 1) points; 2) matches won; 3) goal difference; 4) goals for; 5) head-to-head result; 6) field goals for.
(H) Hosts

10 August 2025
17:30

Argentina	11–0	Brazil
Serrano 2'; Boretti 9'; Martínez 11'; S. Fernández 37', 53'; Costa 44'; Torrigiani 45'; Correa 49', 50'; Rodríguez 52'; J. Fernández 56'	Report

Umpires:
Fabian Romero (PAR)
Claudio Martinez (URU)

12 August 2025
19:30

Brazil	1–1	Paraguay
Lunardi 1'	Report	González 58'

Umpires:
Claudio Martinez (URU)
Pambavasan Manikandan (CAN)

14 August 2025
17:30

Brazil	2–3	United States
Moreira 15' da Silva 27'	Report	Bertelsmeier 2'; Grewal 7', 32'

Umpires:
Claudio Martinez (URU)
Ricardo Albertz (CHI)

Cross-overs

16 August 2025
09:30

Brazil	5–4	Trinidad and Tobago
Moreira 4', 35'; Xavier 7' da Silva 30'; Buzatto 36'	Report	Siu Butt 36'; Edwards 37'; Nieves 46', 51'

Umpires:
Ricardo Albertz (CHI)
Adrian Cross (JAM)

Fifth place match

18 August 2025
11:45

Brazil	0–4	Mexico
	Report	Estrada 40'; Santillan 42'; Cuate 57'; Francis 60'

Umpires:
Brian Tyson (USA)
Fabian Romero (PAR)

== Golf ==
Brazil qualified a full team of four golfers (two men and two women) by virtue of their IGF world amateur rankings. The team was officially named on July 15, 2025.

Athlete	Event	Round 1	Round 2	Round 3	Total		
Athlete	Event	Score	Score	Score	Score	Par	Rank
Gustavo Giacometti	Men's individual	75	83	79	237	+21	16
Guilherme Ziccardi	Men's individual	77	82	81	240	+24	=21
Maria Eugênia Peres	Women's individual	85	85	82	252	+36	=22
Maria Eduarda Rocha	Women's individual	79	79	80	238	+22	=7
Gustavo Giacometti; Guilherme Ziccardi; Maria Eugênia Peres; Maria Eduarda Rocha	Mixed team	147	152	—N/a	299	+11	=6

== Gymnastics ==
Brazil qualified a total of 19 gymnasts (six men and thirteen women). The team was officially named on July 11, 2025.

=== Artistic ===
Brazil qualified a team of eight gymnasts in artistic (four men and four women) at the 2024 Pan American Artistic Gymnastics Championships in Santa Marta, Colombia.

Men

Team & Individual Qualification

Athlete	Event	Final							
Athlete	Event	Apparatus						Total	Rank
Athlete	Event	F	PH	R	V	PB	HB	Total	Rank
Eduardo Belli	Team	12.000	~~10.550~~	11.400	~~12.350~~	11.650	11.250	—N/a	
Ivan Botelho	Team	12.300	12.000 Q	11.800 Q	12.550	11.350	11.700	—N/a	
Caio Pereira	Team	~~11.850~~	11.100	~~11.250~~	12.700	~~10.300~~	~~10.350~~	—N/a	
Pedro Henrique Silvestre	Team	12.100	12.950 Q	11.900 Q	13.400 Q	12.500 Q	12.400 Q	—N/a	
Total	Team	36.400	36.050	35.100	38.650	35.500	35.350	217.050	4

Qualification Legend: Q = Qualified to apparatus final

Individual Finals

Athlete	Event	Apparatus						Total	
Athlete	Event	F	PH	R	V	PB	HB	Score	Rank
Eduardo Belli	All-around	12.000	10.550	11.400	12.350	11.650	11.250	69.200	21
Ivan Botelho	All-around	12.300	12.000	11.800	12.550	11.350	11.700	71.700	14
Caio Pereira	All-around	11.850	11.100	11.250	12.700	10.300	10.350	67.550	28
Pedro Henrique Silvestre	All-around	12.100	12.950	11.900	13.400	12.500	12.400	75.250	2nd place, silver medalist(s)
Ivan Botelho	Pommel horse	—N/a	11.800	—N/a					7
Pedro Henrique Silvestre	Pommel horse	—N/a	12.266	—N/a					1st place, gold medalist(s)
Ivan Botelho	Rings	—N/a		10.433	—N/a				8
Pedro Henrique Silvestre	Rings	—N/a		10.600	—N/a				7
Pedro Henrique Silvestre	Vault	—N/a			13.266	—N/a			5
Pedro Henrique Silvestre	Parallel bars	—N/a				12.400	—N/a		4
Pedro Henrique Silvestre	Horizontal bar	—N/a					12.800	—N/a	3rd place, bronze medalist(s)

Women

Team & Individual Qualification

Athlete	Event	Final					
Athlete	Event	Apparatus				Total	Rank
Athlete	Event	F	BB	V	UB	Total	Rank
Isabel Aguilar	Team	~~10.900~~	12.100 Q	12.850 Q	12.700 Q	—N/a	
Kauany Aquino	Team	11.850 Q	~~11.100~~	13.300 Q	~~9.650~~	—N/a	
Sophia Carvalho	Team	11.400	11.600	~~10.800~~	12.050 Q	—N/a	
Francine Oliveira	Team	11.800	12.150	13.000 Q	11.050	—N/a	
Total	Team	35.050	35.850	39.150	35.800	145.850	2nd place, silver medalist(s)

Qualification Legend: Q = Qualified to apparatus final

Individual Finals

Athlete	Event	Apparatus				Total	
Athlete	Event	F	BB	V	UB	Score	Rank
Isabel Aguilar	All-around	10.900	12.100	12.850	12.700	48.550	7
Kauany Aquino	All-around	11.850	11.100	13.300	9.650	45.900	15
Sophia Carvalho	All-around	11.400	11.600	10.800	12.050	45.850	16
Francine Oliveira	All-around	11.800	12.150	13.000	11.050	48.000	9
Kauany Aquino	Floor	11.533	—N/a				9
Francine Oliveira	Floor	12.100	—N/a				6
Isabel Aguilar	Balance beam	—N/a	12.266	—N/a			3rd place, bronze medalist(s)
Francine Oliveira	Balance beam	—N/a	11.200	—N/a			4
Isabel Aguilar	Vault	—N/a		12.800	—N/a		5
Kauany Aquino	Vault	—N/a		12.949	—N/a		2nd place, silver medalist(s)
Isabel Aguilar	Uneven bars	—N/a			11.166	—N/a	8
Sophia Carvalho	Uneven bars	—N/a			11.600	—N/a	6

=== Rhythmic ===
Brazil qualified two individual gymnasts and five gymnasts for the group event in rhythmic at the 2024 Pan American Rhythmic Gymnastics Championships in Ciudad de Guatemala, Guatemala.

Individual

Athlete	Event	Apparatus				Total	
Athlete	Event	Ball	Clubs	Hoop	Ribbon	Score	Rank
Sarah Mourão	All-around	24.950 Q	25.750 Q	23.700 Q	23.050 Q	97.450	3rd place, bronze medalist(s)
Beatriz Vieira	All-around	23.300 Q	24.050 Q	21.600 Q	23.050 Q	92.000	6
Sarah Mourão	Ball	23.450	—N/a				= (bronze)
Beatriz Vieira	Ball	21.800	—N/a				5
Sarah Mourão	Clubs	—N/a	25.650	—N/a			2nd place, silver medalist(s)
Beatriz Vieira	Clubs	—N/a	22.200	—N/a			7
Sarah Mourão	Hoop	—N/a		23.200	—N/a		5
Beatriz Vieira	Hoop	—N/a		21.650	—N/a		7
Sarah Mourão	Ribbon	—N/a			25.100	—N/a	2nd place, silver medalist(s)
Beatriz Vieira	Ribbon	—N/a			22.100	—N/a	7

Group

Athlete	Event	Apparatus		Total	
Athlete	Event	5 hoops	5 club pairs	Score	Rank
Maria Luiza Albuquerque; Andriely Cichovicz; Júlia Colere; Amanda Manente; Alice Neves	All-around	24.650 Q	18.400 Q	43.050	3rd place, bronze medalist(s)
Maria Luiza Albuquerque; Andriely Cichovicz; Júlia Colere; Amanda Manente; Alice Neves	5 hoops	24.550	—N/a		1st place, gold medalist(s)
Maria Luiza Albuquerque; Andriely Cichovicz; Júlia Colere; Amanda Manente; Alice Neves	5 club pairs	—N/a	22.800	—N/a	3rd place, bronze medalist(s)

=== Trampoline ===
Brazil qualified a team of four gymnasts in trampoline (two men and two women) at the 2024 Pan American Trampoline and Tumbling Championships in Lima, Peru.

Men

Athlete	Event	Qualification		Final	
Athlete	Event	Score	Rank	Score	Rank
Wallace Celestino	Individual	102.45	4 Q	36.16	7
Gabriel Ferreira	Individual	99.15	7 Q	54.94	5
Wallace Celestino; Gabriel Ferreira	Synchronized	42.26	4 Q	47.01	4

Women

Athlete	Event	Qualification		Final	
Athlete	Event	Score	Rank	Score	Rank
Maria Luiza Marcante	Individual	94.76	4 Q	52.04	3rd place, bronze medalist(s)
Julia Rocha	Individual	78.05	9	Did not advance	
Maria Luiza Marcante; Julia Rocha	Synchronized	43.18	2 Q	43.61	4

== Handball ==
Brazil qualified a men's and women's team of 14 athletes each (28 athletes in total).

Summary

Team	Event	Group stage				Semifinal	Final / BM / Pl.	
Team	Event	Opposition Result	Opposition Result	Opposition Result	Rank	Opposition Result	Opposition Result	Rank
Brazil men's	Men's tournament	Mexico; W 40–27	Chile; W 30–19	United States; W 32–22	1 Q	Paraguay; W 45–20	Argentina; W 29–27	1st place, gold medalist(s)
Brazil women's	Women's tournament	Mexico; W 43–15	Cuba; W 39–12	Argentina; W 21–18	1 Q	Uruguay; W 27–8	Argentina; W 22–19	1st place, gold medalist(s)

=== Men's tournament ===
Brazil qualified a men's team (of 12 athletes) by finishing second in the 2024 South and Central American Men's Junior Handball Championship in Managua, Nicaragua.

Roster

The men's team of 14 athletes was officially named on July 25, 2025.

Head coach: Alberto Gallina

- 5 Vinicius Bertoldo CB
- 6 Gabriel Gomes LB
- 11 Emerson Alves LW
- 15 Vinicius Stache RW
- 16 Gabriel Silva GK
- 19 Mikael Lopes RB
- 20 João Vitor Lindoso LW
- 22 Juan Sebastião P
- 23 Kayky Fernando LB
- 25 Thiago Cruz CB
- 27 Rafael Damião RB
- 28 Lucas Gabriel LB
- 47 Renan Iziquiel (c) P
- 74 Guilherme Maia GK
- 75 Diogo Borja P

Preliminary round

Pos	Team	Pld	W	D	L	GF	GA	GD	Pts	Qualification
1	Brazil	3	3	0	0	102	68	+34	6	Semifinals
2	United States	3	2	0	1	87	90	−3	4	Semifinals
3	Chile	3	1	0	2	74	77	−3	2	5–8th place semifinals
4	Mexico	3	0	0	3	83	111	−28	0	5–8th place semifinals

Source: Asunción 2025
Rules for classification: 1) points; 2) head-to-head points; 3) head-to-head goal difference; 4) head-to-head goals scored; 5) goal difference; 6) goals scored; 7) draw.

17 August 2025; 09:00	Brazil	40–27	Mexico	SND Arena, Asunción; Referees: De Jesús, Agramonte (DOM)
17 August 2025; 09:00	Stache 8	(17–15)	three players 5	SND Arena, Asunción; Referees: De Jesús, Agramonte (DOM)
17 August 2025; 09:00	3× (suspension)	Report	1× (suspension)	SND Arena, Asunción; Referees: De Jesús, Agramonte (DOM)

18 August 2025; 09:00	Brazil	30–19	Chile	SND Arena, Asunción; Referees: Sosa, Lemes (URU)
18 August 2025; 09:00	Bertoldo, Lopes 5	(16–8)	Moreno, Oyarzún 4	SND Arena, Asunción; Referees: Sosa, Lemes (URU)
18 August 2025; 09:00	5× (suspension) 1× (red card)	Report	2× (suspension)	SND Arena, Asunción; Referees: Sosa, Lemes (URU)

19 August 2025; 11:30	Brazil	32–22	United States	SND Arena, Asunción; Referees: Alvarez, Gutiérrez (CHI)
19 August 2025; 11:30	three players 5	(13–10)	McCauley 5	SND Arena, Asunción; Referees: Alvarez, Gutiérrez (CHI)
19 August 2025; 11:30	1× (yellow card) 1× (suspension)	Report	2× (suspension)	SND Arena, Asunción; Referees: Alvarez, Gutiérrez (CHI)

Semifinal

21 August 2025; 20:00	Brazil	45–20	Paraguay	SND Arena, Asunción; Referees: De Jesús, Agramonte (DOM)
21 August 2025; 20:00	Bertoldo, Stache 7	(20–10)	Barrios 4	SND Arena, Asunción; Referees: De Jesús, Agramonte (DOM)
21 August 2025; 20:00	3× (suspension)	Report	1× (suspension)	SND Arena, Asunción; Referees: De Jesús, Agramonte (DOM)

Gold medal match

22 August 2025; 20:00	Argentina	27–29	Brazil	SND Arena, Asunción; Referees: Sosa, Lemes (URU)
22 August 2025; 20:00	N. Rodríguez 10	(14–11)	Lopes 9	SND Arena, Asunción; Referees: Sosa, Lemes (URU)
22 August 2025; 20:00	1× (yellow card) 2× (suspension)	Report	2× (yellow card) 4× (suspension) 1× (red card)	SND Arena, Asunción; Referees: Sosa, Lemes (URU)

=== Women's tournament ===
Brazil qualified a women's team (of 12 athletes) by finishing second in the 2025 IHF South and Central American Women's Trophy Junior in Asunción, Paraguay.

Roster

The women's team of 14 athletes was officially named on July 11, 2025.

Head coach: Cristiano Rocha

- 5 Ana Karolina Nunes RW
- 9 Maria Clara Martins RB
- 13 Eduarda Borges CB
- 14 Samanta Hevelin RB
- 16 Ana Julia Machado GK
- 17 Beatriz Rodrigues P
- 19 Yasmin Ferreira RW
- 20 Nhauany Teixeira LW
- 21 Ryanne Gama LB
- 25 Raquel Ladeia LB
- 27 Sophia Kieling GK
- 28 Luana Flores P
- 77 Lorenna Loyane (c) CB

Preliminary round

Pos	Team	Pld	W	D	L	GF	GA	GD	Pts	Qualification
1	Brazil	3	3	0	0	103	45	+58	6	Semifinals
2	Argentina	3	2	0	1	97	55	+42	4	Semifinals
3	Mexico	3	1	0	2	63	102	−39	2	5–8th place semifinals
4	Cuba	3	0	0	3	59	120	−61	0	5–8th place semifinals

Source: Asunción 2025
Rules for classification: 1) points; 2) head-to-head points; 3) head-to-head goal difference; 4) head-to-head goals scored; 5) goal difference; 6) goals scored; 7) draw.

10 August 2025; 09:00	Brazil	43–15	Mexico	SND Arena, Asunción; Referees: Alvarez, Gutiérrez (CHI)
10 August 2025; 09:00	Ladeia 7	(21–8)	Arenas 6	SND Arena, Asunción; Referees: Alvarez, Gutiérrez (CHI)
10 August 2025; 09:00	1× (yellow card) 3× (suspension)	Report	1× (yellow card) 5× (suspension)	SND Arena, Asunción; Referees: Alvarez, Gutiérrez (CHI)

11 August 2025; 09:00	Cuba	12–39	Brazil	SND Arena, Asunción; Referees: Sosa, Lemes (URU)
11 August 2025; 09:00	Sardiñas 5	(8–18)	Loyane 11	SND Arena, Asunción; Referees: Sosa, Lemes (URU)
11 August 2025; 09:00	4× (suspension) 1× (red card)	Report	1× (yellow card) 3× (suspension)	SND Arena, Asunción; Referees: Sosa, Lemes (URU)

12 August 2025; 11:30	Argentina	18–21	Brazil	SND Arena, Asunción; Referees: Aguilera, Gutiérrez (CHI)
12 August 2025; 11:30	Carballo 5	(11–13)	Ladeia 9	SND Arena, Asunción; Referees: Aguilera, Gutiérrez (CHI)
12 August 2025; 11:30	5× (suspension)	Report	1× (yellow card) 4× (suspension)	SND Arena, Asunción; Referees: Aguilera, Gutiérrez (CHI)

Semifinal

14 August 2025; 17:00	Brazil	27–8	Uruguay	SND Arena, Asunción; Referees: Alvarez, Gutiérrez (CHI)
14 August 2025; 17:00	Ladeia 6	(15–4)	Balseiro, Campos 3	SND Arena, Asunción; Referees: Alvarez, Gutiérrez (CHI)
14 August 2025; 17:00	3× (suspension)	Report	3× (suspension)	SND Arena, Asunción; Referees: Alvarez, Gutiérrez (CHI)

Gold medal match

15 August 2025; 20:00	Brazil	22–19	Argentina	SND Arena, Asunción; Referees: Sosa, Lemes (URU)
15 August 2025; 20:00	Ladeia 7	(15–8)	Carballo 6	SND Arena, Asunción; Referees: Sosa, Lemes (URU)
15 August 2025; 20:00	3× (suspension)	Report	1× (yellow card) 3× (suspension)	SND Arena, Asunción; Referees: Sosa, Lemes (URU)

== Judo ==
Brazil qualified a full team of 14 judokas (seven men and seven women) by virtue of their IJF junior world rankings. The team was officially named on June 4, 2025.

Men

Athlete	Event	Round of 16	Quarterfinals	Semifinals	Repechage	Final / BM	
Athlete	Event	Opposition Result	Opposition Result	Opposition Result	Opposition Result	Opposition Result	Rank
Lucas Takaki	−60 kg	Maldonado (PAR); W 100–000	Benavides (ECU); L 000–100s1	Did not advance	Hernández (CUB); W 010s1–000s1	Bronze medal final Pino (COL); W 101s1–010s3	3rd place, bronze medalist(s)
Bruno Nóbrega	−66 kg	Bye	Vanegas (COL); W 011–000s1	Johnson (BAH); W 110–000s1	Bye	Yang (USA); W 100–000	1st place, gold medalist(s)
Matheus Nolasco	−73 kg	Bye	Manzi (URU); W 100s1–000s1	Hernández (CHI); W 001–000s1	Bye	Valdivieso (ECU); W 101s1–000	1st place, gold medalist(s)
Luan Almeida	−81 kg	—N/a	Veron (PAR); W 100–000	Shulgin (USA); W 100–000	Bye	Karpukov (CAN); W 001s2–000s1	1st place, gold medalist(s)
Jesse Barbosa	−90 kg	—N/a	Benitez (PAR); W 100–000	Quinteros (ARG); W 100–000	Bye	Cardoso (CUB); W 101s1–000s1	1st place, gold medalist(s)
Gustavo Milano	−100 kg	—N/a	Cañizalez (VEN); W 100–000	Ramírez (CUB); W WDR	Bye	Liubimovski (USA); W 001–000s2	1st place, gold medalist(s)
Andrey Coelho	+100 kg	—N/a	Valdivia (PER); W 110–000s1	Sánchez (MEX); W 101–000s2	Bye	Brache (DOM); W 102–000s3	1st place, gold medalist(s)

Women

Athlete	Event	Round of 16	Quarterfinals	Semifinals	Repechage	Final / BM	
Athlete	Event	Opposition Result	Opposition Result	Opposition Result	Opposition Result	Opposition Result	Rank
Clarice Ribeiro	−48 kg	Bye	Tamura (CAN); W 100–000	Manibog (USA); W 100–000	Bye	Crespo (COL); W 001s1–000s2	1st place, gold medalist(s)
Rafaela Rodrigues	−52 kg	Bye	Golu (COL); W 100–000	Ruiz (VEN); W 100s1–001s3	Bye	Ávila (MEX); W 100–000s3	1st place, gold medalist(s)
Bianca Reis	−57 kg	Bye	Cancela (USA); W 100s1–000s3	Solis (COL); W 100–000s1	Bye	Pacheco (VEN); W 101–000	1st place, gold medalist(s)
Eduarda Bastos	−63 kg	—N/a	Aguilar (CRC); W 100–000s3	Fuentes (VEN); W 001–000	Bye	Jaspe (USA); W 001s2–000s1	1st place, gold medalist(s)
Maria Eduarda Oliveira	−70 kg	—N/a	Ramírez (DOM); W 100s1–000s3	Gonzalez (USA); W 001s2–000s2	Bye	Santillana (COL); W 000s1–002s1	2nd place, silver medalist(s)
Dandara Camillo	−78 kg	—N/a	Pesantez (ECU); W 100–000s2	Gonzalez (CUB); W 100–000	Bye	Murillo (COL); W 100–000s3	1st place, gold medalist(s)
Ana Gabrielle Soares	+78 kg	—N/a	Gómez (DOM); L 000s3–100s2	Did not advance	Padilla (MEX); W WDR	Bronze medal final Kofman (CAN); W 100–000	3rd place, bronze medalist(s)

Mixed

Athlete	Event	Round of 16	Quarterfinals	Semifinals	Repechage	Final / BM	
Athlete	Event	Opposition Result	Opposition Result	Opposition Result	Opposition Result	Opposition Result	Rank
Lucas Takaki; Bruno Nóbrega; Matheus Nolasco; Luan Almeida; Jesse Barbosa; Gustavo Milano; Andrey Coelho; Clarice Ribeiro; Rafaela Rodrigues; Bianca Reis; Eduarda Bastos; Maria Eduarda Oliveira; Dandara Camillo; Ana Gabrielle Soares	Team	Bye	United States; W 4–0	Colombia; W 4–1	Bye	Cuba; W 4–0	1st place, gold medalist(s)

== Karate ==
Brazil qualified a full team of seven karatekas (three men and four women) through the 2024 Pan American Karate Qualifying Championship in São Bernardo do Campo, Brazil.

Kumite

Men

Athlete	Event	Round robin				Semifinal	Final	
Athlete	Event	Opposition Result	Opposition Result	Opposition Result	Rank	Opposition Result	Opposition Result	Rank
Lucas Menezes	−75 kg	Gómez (COL); W 5–0	Bricteux (CAN); W 3–1	Castro (VEN); L 0–0	2 Q	Salesky (ARG); W 2–1	Castro (VEN); L 2–3	2nd place, silver medalist(s)
Andrey Nazário	−84 kg	Garcia (MEX); W 9–1	Taneski (USA); W 3–2	—N/a	1 Q	Becerra (BOL); W 6–2	Dotta (URU); W 8–0	1st place, gold medalist(s)
Ademilton Nogueira	+84 kg	White (USA); W 10–10	Sanchez (VEN); L 2–6	Velasco (MEX); W 3–3	2 Q	Vallejo (ECU); L 3–3	Did not advance	3rd place, bronze medalist(s)

Women

Athlete	Event	Round robin				Semifinal	Final	
Athlete	Event	Opposition Result	Opposition Result	Opposition Result	Rank	Opposition Result	Opposition Result	Rank
Leticia Kato	−55 kg	Marenco (NCA); W 5–1	Bolado (ARG); W 6–2	Sandoval (BOL); W 5–4	1 Q	Gómez (PER); L 1–6	Did not advance	3rd place, bronze medalist(s)
Maria Isabel Alvites	−61 kg	Gómez (COL); W 3–1	Monfiston (CAN); T 0–0	Floresca (USA); W 5–2	1 Q	Pacheco (ARG); W 5–0	Herrera (MEX); L 1–6	2nd place, silver medalist(s)
Roberta Lopes	−68 kg	Crowle (CAN); W 2–1	Hernandez (PUR); L 0–1	Ubeda (NCA); W 4–1	2 Q	Juncosa (VEN); L 1–5	Did not advance	3rd place, bronze medalist(s)
Barbara Amaral	+68 kg	Morales (PAR); W 10–0	Jennings (USA); T 0–0	Guarin (COL); W 4–2	1 Q	Muñoz (CHI); W 3–2	Manrique (ECU); L 0–1	2nd place, silver medalist(s)

== Open water swimming ==
Brazil qualified a full team of four open water swimmers (two men and two women) through the 2025 Pan American Aquatics Championships in Medellín, Colombia.

Athlete	Event	Final	
Athlete	Event	Time	Rank
Leonardo Macedo	Men's 10 km	1:53:03.30	3rd place, bronze medalist(s)
Matheus Melecchi	Men's 10 km	1:50:05.70	2nd place, silver medalist(s)
Cibelle Jungblut	Women's 10 km	2:01:14.70	1st place, gold medalist(s)
Lizian Simões	Women's 10 km	2:01:33.80	4

== Roller sports ==
=== Artistic ===
Brazil qualified a team of three artistic skaters (one men and two women) through the 2024 Pan American Championships in Nations in Ibagué, Colombia. The team was officially named on May 23, 2025.

Men

Athlete	Event	Short program		Long program		Total	
Athlete	Event	Score	Rank	Score	Rank	Score	Rank
Erik Medziukevicius	Free skating	83.80	1	130.05	1	213.85	1st place, gold medalist(s)
Erik Medziukevicius	Solo dance	57.82	2	77.76	2	135.58	2nd place, silver medalist(s)

Women

Athlete	Event	Short program		Long program		Total	
Athlete	Event	Score	Rank	Score	Rank	Score	Rank
Laura Guimarães	Free skating	57.20	1	79.09	3	136.29	2nd place, silver medalist(s)
Lia Iwazaki	Solo dance	59.44	1	78.31	1	137.75	1st place, gold medalist(s)

=== Speed ===
Brazil qualified one man speed skater through the 2024 Pan American Speed Skating Championships in Nations in Ibagué, Colombia.

Men

Athlete	Event	Qualification		Semifinal		Final	
Athlete	Event	Time	Rank	Time	Rank	Time	Rank
Guilherme Abel Rocha	200 m time trial	—N/a				18.104	4
Guilherme Abel Rocha	500 m + distance	44.259	6 Q	44.926	5 q	45.606	6
Guilherme Abel Rocha	1000 m sprint	1:27.394	10	—N/a		Did not advance	
Guilherme Abel Rocha	10,000 m elimination	—N/a				EL	10

=== Skateboarding ===
Brazil qualified a team of four skateboarders (two men and two women) by virtue of their WSkate world rankings. The team was officially named on June 30, 2025.

Street

Athlete	Event	Qualification		Final	
Athlete	Event	Score	Rank	Score	Rank
Matheus João Mendes	Men's	155.38	2 Q	165.64	3rd place, bronze medalist(s)
Filipe Mota	Men's	171.37	1 Q	173.05	1st place, gold medalist(s)
Maria Lúcia Campos	Women's	113.02	2 Q	151.21	1st place, gold medalist(s)
Daniela Vitória	Women's	98.80	4 Q	108.72	5

== Rowing ==
Brazil qualified a full team of 18 rowers (nine men and nine women) through the Qualification Regatta in Asunción, Paraguay. The team was officially named on June 11, 2025.

Men

Athlete	Event	Heat		Repechage		Final A/B	
Athlete	Event	Time	Rank	Time	Rank	Time	Rank
Marcelo Almeida	Single sculls	7:14.89	1 FA	Bye		7:11.35	3rd place, bronze medalist(s)
João Vinicius Ferreira; Daniel Passold	Double sculls	6:55.39	1 FA	Bye		6:31.97	1st place, gold medalist(s)
Marcelo Almeida; João Vinicius Ferreira; Daniel Passold; Arthur Veiga	Quadruple sculls	—N/a				6:01.75	2nd place, silver medalist(s)
Miguel Marques; Kayki Siqueira	Pair	—N/a				6:48.35	3rd place, bronze medalist(s)
Andrei Jessé; Miguel Marques; Kayki Siqueira; Diogo Volkmann	Four	—N/a				6:32.41	3rd place, bronze medalist(s)
Marcelo Almeida; João Vinicius Ferreira; Andrei Jessé; Miguel Marques; Daniel Passold; Kayki Siqueira; Arthur Veiga; Diogo Volkmann; Marcello Oliveira c	Eight	—N/a				5:45.75	2nd place, silver medalist(s)

Women

Athlete	Event	Heat		Repechage		Final A/B	
Athlete	Event	Time	Rank	Time	Rank	Time	Rank
Julia Moreno	Single sculls	8:45.08	5 R	8:24.60	2 FA	8:19.29	5
Lara Pizarro; Jennifer Silva	Double sculls	7:40.56	1 FA	Bye		7:11.17	1st place, gold medalist(s)
Isabella Gomes; Julia Moreno; Lara Pizarro; Jennifer Silva	Quadruple sculls	—N/a				6:49.29	2nd place, silver medalist(s)
Ana Júlia Ferreira; Maria Fuhrmann	Pair	—N/a				7:36.22	4
Ana Júlia Ferreira; Maria Fuhrmann; Luiza Nazário; Giulia Renata	Four	—N/a				7:09.99	5
Ana Júlia Ferreira; Maria Fuhrmann; Isabella Gomes; Julia Moreno; Luiza Nazário; Lara Pizarro; Giulia Renata; Jennifer Silva; Kauanne Alves c	Eight	—N/a				6:36.59	3rd place, bronze medalist(s)

Mixed

Athlete	Event	Final A/B	
Athlete	Event	Time	Rank
Andrei Jessé; Miguel Marques; Kayki Rocha; Diogo Volkmann; Ana Júlia Ferreira; Maria Fuhrmann; Luiza Nazário; Giulia Renata; Marcello Oliveira c	Eight	6:08.52	2nd place, silver medalist(s)

Qualification Legend: FA=Final A (medal); FB=Final B (non-medal); R=Repechage

== Rugby sevens ==
Brazil qualified a women's team of 12 athletes.

Summary

Team	Event	Group stage				Semifinal	Final / BM / Pl.	
Team	Event	Opposition Result	Opposition Result	Opposition Result	Rank	Opposition Result	Opposition Result	Rank
Brazil women's	Women's tournament	Mexico; W 46–0	Paraguay; W 57–0	United States; L 5–19	2 Q	Canada; W 12–7	United States; W 17–7	1st place, gold medalist(s)

=== Women's tournament ===
Brazil qualified a women's team (of 12 athletes) by finishing at the core teams of the Word Rugby Women's Sevens Series 2024/25.

Roster

The women's team of 14 athletes was officially named on June 30, 2025. The final roster was revealed on August 8, 2025.

Head coach: Rafaela Turola

- 3 Raylanne Nascimento
- 4 Ariely Faria
- 6 Heloysa Macedo (c)
- 7 Letícia Pinheiro
- 8 Mariely Faria
- 10 Isabelle Gonçalves
- 11 Geovanna Carvalho
- 13 Giovanna Braz
- 14 Cláudia Beltran
- 15 Agatha Vitória Fernandes
- 23 Maria Gabrieli Pereira
- 77 Mariana Neves

Preliminary round

Pos	Team	Pld	W	D	L	PF	PA	PD	Pts	Qualification
1	United States	3	3	0	0	106	5	+101	9	Semifinals
2	Brazil	3	2	0	1	108	19	+89	7	Semifinals
3	Mexico	3	1	0	2	27	85	−58	5	5–8th place semifinals
4	Paraguay	3	0	0	3	0	132	−132	3	5–8th place semifinals

Source: Asunción 2025
Rules for classification: 1) Points; 2) Head-to-head result; 3) Point difference; 4) Points scored; 5) draw.

16 August 2025
10:14

Brazil	46–0	Mexico
Try: Nascimento 0'; Beltran (2) 2', 7'; M. Faria 4'; A. Faria (2) 6', 5'; Carvalho 2'; Gonçalves 7'; Con: A. Faria (2/3) 3', 5'; Braz (1/2) 2'	Report

Estadio Héroes de Curupayty
Referee: Armen Abi Saab (Uruguay)

16 August 2025
15:14

Brazil	57–0	Paraguay
Try: Macedo (2) 0', 6'; A. Faria 3'; Braz 7'; Nascimento 0'; Fernandes 3'; Pereira 4'; Gonçalves 6'; Neves 7'; Con: A. Faria (3/4) 3', 7', 3'; Braz (2/2) 6', 0'; Pinheiro (1/1) 4'	Report

Estadio Héroes de Curupayty
Referee: Alexis Saari (United States)

16 August 2025
18:47

United States	19–5	Brazil
Try: Wilfley 4'; Larkin (2) 6', 7'; Con: Vogel (2/2) 6', 7'	Report	Try: Beltran 4'

Estadio Héroes de Curupayty
Referee: Armen Abi Saab (Uruguay)

Semifinal

17 August 2025
11:40

Canada	7–12	Brazil
Try: Stevenson 3'; Con: Douglas (1/1) 3'	Report	Try: M. Faria 2'; Braz 4'; Con: Braz (1/2) 4'

Estadio Héroes de Curupayty
Referee: Luca Solda (Argentina)

Gold medal match

17 August 2025
18:15

Brazil	17–7	United States
Try: A. Faria (2) 2', 1'; Macedo 5'	Report	Try: Larkin 3'; Con: Vogel (1/1) 3'

Estadio Héroes de Curupayty
Referee: Luca Solda (Argentina)

== Sailing ==
Brazil qualified a total of four sailors (two men and two women) through the Qualifying Regattas in Porto Alegre, Brazil, and in Mendoza, Argentina. Both boats qualified, meanwhile the men's kite quota was through the Youth Sailing World Championships.

Men

Athlete	Event	Race					Net points	Rank
Athlete	Event	1	2	3	4	5	Net points	Rank
Gustavo Kiessling	ILCA 7	4	~~11~~	2	2	7	15	3rd place, bronze medalist(s)
Lucas Fonseca	Formula Kite	~~1~~	1	1	1	—N/a	3	1st place, gold medalist(s)

Women

Athlete	Event	Race					Net points	Rank
Athlete	Event	1	2	3	4	5	Net points	Rank
Sofia Rocha	IQFoil	~~6~~; ~~STP~~	2	4	4	4	14	4
Ana Carolina Tonniges	ILCA 6	2	2	~~6~~	5	4	13	4

== Shooting ==
Brazil qualified a total of nine sports shooters (five men and four women) at the 2025 Americas Junior Rifle and Pistol Championships in Asunción, Paraguay, and the 2025 Americas Junior Shotgun Shooting Championship in Bridgetown, Barbados. The team was officially named on August 6, 2025.

Men

Pistol and rifle

Athlete	Event	Qualification		Final	
Athlete	Event	Points	Rank	Points	Rank
Caio Almeida	10 m air pistol	574–14x QJPR	2 Q	232.7	2nd place, silver medalist(s)
Thor Barcelos Palomares	10 m air pistol	512–5x	17	Did not advance	
Emanuel Wyctor	10 m air rifle	609.1	12	Did not advance	

Shotgun

Athlete	Event	Qualification		Final	
Athlete	Event	Points	Rank	Points	Rank
Haddy Darwich	Trap	97	4 Q	16	6
Hussein Daruich	Trap	108	2 Q	41	1st place, gold medalist(s)

Women

Pistol and rifle

Athlete	Event	Qualification		Final	
Athlete	Event	Points	Rank	Points	Rank
Camila Maalouf	10 m air pistol	523–6x	17	Did not advance	
Ana Beatriz Mariano	10 m air pistol	552–12x	5 Q	112.3	8
Luana Biazotto	10 m air rifle	DSQ		Did not advance	

Shotgun

Athlete	Event	Qualification		Final	
Athlete	Event	Points	Rank	Points	Rank
Ellen Mendes	Trap	82	5 Q	29	3rd place, bronze medalist(s)

Mixed

Athlete	Event	Qualification		Final / BM	
Athlete	Event	Points	Rank	Opposition Result	Rank
Thor Barcelos Palomares; Camila Maalouf	10 m air pistol team	535	13	Did not advance	
Caio Almeida; Ana Beatriz Mariano	10 m air pistol team	557	4 QB	Bronze medal final Quintero / Rosales (MEX); W 17–15	3rd place, bronze medalist(s)
Emanuel Wyctor; Luana Biazotto	10 m air rifle team	603.9	12	Did not advance	
Hussein Daruich; Ellen Mendes	Trap team	104	3 QB	Bronze medal final Lima / Poveda (GUA); W 40–30	3rd place, bronze medalist(s)

== Squash ==
Brazil qualified a full team of six squash players (three men and three women) by finishing in the top eight at the 2024 Pan American U23 Squash Championships in Bucaramanga, Colombia.

Men

Athlete	Event	Round of 32	Round of 16	Quarterfinal	Semifinal	Final / BM	
Athlete	Event	Opposition Result	Opposition Result	Opposition Result	Opposition Result	Opposition Result	Rank
Murilo Penteado	Singles	Bye	Stewart (BAR); W 3–0	Irisarri (COL); L 1–3	Did not advance		
Isaías Silva	Singles	Bye	Alfonso (ARG); W 3–0	Torres (COL); L 1–3	Did not advance		
Murilo Penteado; João Carlos Santos	Doubles	—N/a	Bye	Benn / Stewart (BAR); W 2–1	Alfonso / Portabales (ARG); L 1–2	Did not advance	3rd place, bronze medalist(s)
Murilo Penteado; João Carlos Santos; Isaías Silva	Team	—N/a	Bye	Mexico; L 1–2	5th–8th place classification Barbados; W 3–0	Fifth place match Guatemala; W 2–0	5

Women

Athlete	Event	Round of 32	Round of 16	Quarterfinal	Semifinal	Final / BM	
Athlete	Event	Opposition Result	Opposition Result	Opposition Result	Opposition Result	Opposition Result	Rank
Clara Braga	Singles	Bye	Gaitán (GUA); L 1–3	Did not advance			
Laura Silva	Singles	Bye	Krauch (PAR); W 3–0	Castillo (PER); W 3–0	Falconí (ECU); W 3–0	Gatti (PAR); L 0–3	2nd place, silver medalist(s)
Clara Braga; Giulia Colleoni	Doubles	—N/a	Cino / Krauch (PAR); W 2–0	Botello / Franco (MEX); L 0–2	Did not advance		
Clara Braga; Giulia Colleoni; Laura Silva	Team	—N/a	Bye	Colombia; L 1–2	5th–8th place classification Guatemala; W 2–0	Fifth place match Argentina; L 0–2	6

Mixed

Athlete	Event	Round of 16	Quarterfinal	Semifinal	Final / BM	
Athlete	Event	Opposition Result	Opposition Result	Opposition Result	Opposition Result	Rank
Isaías Silva; Laura Silva	Doubles	Bye	Ávila / Narvaez (MEX); L 0–2	Did not advance		

== Swimming ==
Brazil qualified a full team of 28 swimmers (14 men and 14 women) through the entry standards in the following events (a maximum of two swimmers) either by the Qualification Time (PTQ / "A" Time) or by potentially the Consideration Time (PST / "B" Time). On May 15, 2025, the Brazilian Confederation of Aquatic Sports announced the pool team of swimmers.

Men

Athlete	Event	Heat		Final	
Athlete	Event	Time	Rank	Time	Rank
Guilherme Caribé	50 m freestyle	22.37	2 Q	21.72 JPR	1st place, gold medalist(s)
Pedro Sansone	50 m freestyle	22.65	4 Q	22.32	= (bronze)
Guilherme Caribé	100 m freestyle	49.75	1 Q	47.54 JPR	1st place, gold medalist(s)
Pedro Sansone	100 m freestyle	49.98	5 Q	49.76	6
Stephan Steverink	200 m freestyle	1:49.75	1 Q	1:47.23 JPR	1st place, gold medalist(s)
Davi Zanella	200 m freestyle	1:52.74	9 q	1:49.74	9
Leonardo Alcantara	400 m freestyle	3:57.07	3 Q	3:50.55	3rd place, bronze medalist(s)
Stephan Steverink	400 m freestyle	3:54.39	1 Q	3:46.71 JPR	1st place, gold medalist(s)
João Pierre Campos	800 m freestyle	—N/a		8:00.99	2nd place, silver medalist(s)
Stephan Steverink	800 m freestyle	—N/a		7:54.49 JPR	1st place, gold medalist(s)
João Pierre Campos	1500 m freestyle	—N/a		15:19.77 JPR	1st place, gold medalist(s)
Matheus Melecchi	1500 m freestyle	—N/a		15:21.13	2nd place, silver medalist(s)
Samuel Lopes	100 m backstroke	56.51	6 Q	55.93	6
Samuel Lopes	200 m backstroke	2:02.88	2 Q	2:00.65	2nd place, silver medalist(s)
Guilherme Camossato	100 m breaststroke	1:02.13	3 Q	1:01.26	2nd place, silver medalist(s)
Guilherme Camossato	200 m breaststroke	2:14.92	2 Q	2:12.69	2nd place, silver medalist(s)
Lúcio Flávio Filho	100 m butterfly	52.86	1 Q	51.78 JPR	1st place, gold medalist(s)
Gabriel Machuco	100 m butterfly	53.75	3 Q	53.30	5
Gabriel Moura	200 m butterfly	2:01.86	4 Q	1:59.45	2nd place, silver medalist(s)
Gustavo Saldo	200 m butterfly	1:59.46	1 Q	1:58.95 JPR	1st place, gold medalist(s)
Gabriel Machuco	200 m individual medley	2:04.96	6 Q	2:03.18	4
Stephan Steverink	200 m individual medley	2:03.14	1 Q	2:01.83	2nd place, silver medalist(s)
Guilherme Kanzler	400 m individual medley	4:24.79	1 Q	4:18.15	2nd place, silver medalist(s)
Stephan Steverink	400 m individual medley	4:26.05	2 Q	4:16.06 JPR	1st place, gold medalist(s)
Guilherme Caribé; Gabriel Machuco; Pedro Sansone; Davi Zanella; João Pierre Campos^{[b]} Lúcio Flávio Filho^{[b]} Samuel Lopes^{[b]} Gabriel Moura^{[b]}	4 × 100 m freestyle relay	3:24.09	3 Q	3:18.36	1st place, gold medalist(s)
Gabriel Machuco; Gabriel Moura; Stephan Steverink; Davi Zanella	4 × 200 m freestyle relay	—N/a		7:18.49 JPR	1st place, gold medalist(s)
Guilherme Camossato; Lúcio Flávio Filho; Samuel Lopes; Pedro Sansone; Gustavo Saldo^{[b]} Davi Zanella^{[b]}	4 × 100 m medley relay	3:43.58	1 Q	3:38.59	2nd place, silver medalist(s)

Women

Athlete	Event	Heat		Final	
Athlete	Event	Time	Rank	Time	Rank
Stephanie Balduccini	50 m freestyle	25.75	1 Q	25.42	= (gold)
Beatriz Bezerra	50 m freestyle	25.98	3 Q	25.62	3rd place, bronze medalist(s)
Stephanie Balduccini	100 m freestyle	55.93	1 Q	54.91	1st place, gold medalist(s)
Beatriz Bezerra	100 m freestyle	57.14	5 Q	56.28	4
Stephanie Balduccini	200 m freestyle	2:01.50	1 Q	1:58.83 JPR	1st place, gold medalist(s)
Fernanda Celidônio	200 m freestyle	2:03.21	3 Q	2:02.53	4
Carolina Daher	400 m freestyle	4:17.79	3 Q	4:15.78	4
Letícia Romão	400 m freestyle	4:17.03	2 Q	4:14.29	2nd place, silver medalist(s)
Leticia de Paula	800 m freestyle	—N/a		8:59.67	4
Letícia Romão	800 m freestyle	—N/a		8:40.88 JPR	1st place, gold medalist(s)
Mariana Costa	1500 m freestyle	—N/a		16:49.95	3rd place, bronze medalist(s)
Letícia Romão	1500 m freestyle	—N/a		16:30.86 JPR	1st place, gold medalist(s)
Julia Karla Góes	100 m backstroke	1:03.40	3 Q	1:02.82	3rd place, bronze medalist(s)
Sophia Penteriche	100 m backstroke	1:04.61	11 q	1:05.82	13
Mariana Costa	200 m backstroke	2:19.51	8 Q	2:20.72	8
Sophia Penteriche	200 m backstroke	2:24.15	15 q	2:21.13	10
Fernanda Celidônio	100 m breaststroke	DSQ		Did not advance	
Nichelly Lysy	100 m breaststroke	1:10.09	4 Q	1:09.85	4
Agatha Amaral	200 m breaststroke	2:32.43	1 Q	2:30.09	1st place, gold medalist(s)
Nichelly Lysy	200 m breaststroke	2:38.05	3 Q	2:33.72	3rd place, bronze medalist(s)
Beatriz Bezerra	100 m butterfly	1:01.06	3 Q	59.82	2nd place, silver medalist(s)
Joice Otero	100 m butterfly	1:00.74	1 Q	59.70 JPR	1st place, gold medalist(s)
Ana Julia Amaral	200 m butterfly	2:15.24	3 Q	2:13.08 JPR	1st place, gold medalist(s)
Joice Otero	200 m butterfly	2:21.41	9 q	2:16.53	9
Fernanda Celidônio	200 m individual medley	2:19.77	2 Q	2:16.49	2nd place, silver medalist(s)
Nichelly Lysy	200 m individual medley	2:20.44	3 Q	2:19.54	6
Agatha Amaral	400 m individual medley	4:56.44	2 Q	4:50.83	3rd place, bronze medalist(s)
Leticia de Paula	400 m individual medley	5:02.41	5 Q	4:58.00	5
Julia Ariosa; Stephanie Balduccini; Beatriz Bezerra; Fernanda Celidônio; Ana Julia Amaral^{[b]} Carolina Daher^{[b]} Joice Otero^{[b]}	4 × 100 m freestyle relay	3:52.08	3 Q	3:44.03 JPR	1st place, gold medalist(s)
Julia Ariosa; Stephanie Balduccini; Fernanda Celidônio; Carolina Daher; Mariana Costa^{[b]} Joice Otero^{[b]} Leticia de Paula^{[b]} Letícia Romão^{[b]}	4 × 200 m freestyle relay	8:23.71	1 Q	8:08.49 JPR	1st place, gold medalist(s)
Stephanie Balduccini; Julia Karla Góes; Nichelly Lysy; Joice Otero	4 × 100 m medley relay	—N/a		4:05.92 JPR	1st place, gold medalist(s)

Mixed

Athlete	Event	Heat		Final	
Athlete	Event	Time	Rank	Time	Rank
Guilherme Caribé; Pedro Sansone; Stephanie Balduccini; Beatriz Bezerra; Gabriel Moura^{[b]} Gustavo Saldo^{[b]} Julia Ariosa^{[b]} Carolina Daher^{[b]}	4 × 100 m freestyle relay	3:36.51	1 Q	3:28.85 JPR	1st place, gold medalist(s)
Guilherme Camossato; Lúcio Flávio Filho; Stephanie Balduccini; Julia Karla Góes; Gustavo Saldo^{[b]} Davi Zanella^{[b]} Fernanda Celidônio^{[b]} Sophia Penteriche^{[b]}	4 × 100 m medley relay	4:00.63	3 Q	3:51.55 JPR	1st place, gold medalist(s)

Qualification Legend: Q – Qualify to the medal final; q – Qualify to the non-medal final

^{b} Swimmers who only participated in the heats, but who also win medals.

== Table tennis ==
Brazil qualified a full team of four table tennis players (two men and two women) after all teams finished at least in the top four at the 2025 South American U19 Table Tennis Championship in Monteria, Colombia. The team was officially named on May 30, 2025.

Men

Athlete	Event	Group stage				Round of 32	Round of 16	Quarterfinal	Semifinal	Final / BM	
Athlete	Event	Opposition Result	Opposition Result	Opposition Result	Rank	Opposition Result	Opposition Result	Opposition Result	Opposition Result	Opposition Result	Rank
Felipe Arado	Singles	—N/a				Molina (ESA); W 4–0	Callaba (ARG); W 4–0	Naresh (USA); L 1–4	Did not advance		
Leonardo Iizulka	Singles	—N/a				Lubin (LCA); W 4–0	Buenrostro (MEX); W 4–1	Robayo (ECU); W 4–1	Vila (DOM); W 4–3	Naresh (USA); L 2–4	2nd place, silver medalist(s)
Felipe Arado; Leonardo Iizulka	Doubles	—N/a					Carrillo / Gatica (GUA); W 3–0	Cabrera / Vila (DOM); W 3–2	Revelo / Robayo (ECU); W 3–0	Naresh / Xie (USA); W 3–0	1st place, gold medalist(s)
Felipe Arado; Leonardo Iizulka	Team	Dominican Republic; W 3–0	Argentina; W 3–1	El Salvador; W 3–0	1 Q	—N/a		Paraguay; W 3–0	Venezuela; W 3–1	Puerto Rico; W 3–0	1st place, gold medalist(s)

Women

Athlete	Event	Group stage				Round of 32	Round of 16	Quarterfinal	Semifinal	Final / BM	
Athlete	Event	Opposition Result	Opposition Result	Opposition Result	Rank	Opposition Result	Opposition Result	Opposition Result	Opposition Result	Opposition Result	Rank
Beatriz Fiore	Singles	—N/a				Dominguez (CUB); W 4–0	Xu (CAN); L 2–4	Did not advance			
Karina Shiray	Singles	—N/a				Melendez (PUR); L 2–4	Did not advance				
Beatriz Fiore; Karina Shiray	Doubles	—N/a					Bye	Estrella / Sosa (DOM); W 3–1	Chan / Xu (CAN); W 3–2	Leon / Melendez (PUR); W 3–2	1st place, gold medalist(s)
Beatriz Fiore; Karina Shiray	Team	Cuba; W 3–0	Canada; W 3–0	El Salvador; W 3–1	1 Q	—N/a		Peru; W 3–0	Colombia; W 3–0	United States; L 1–3	2nd place, silver medalist(s)

Mixed

Athlete	Event	Round of 32	Round of 16	Quarterfinal	Semifinal	Final / BM	
Athlete	Event	Opposition Result	Opposition Result	Opposition Result	Opposition Result	Opposition Result	Rank
Felipe Arado; Karina Shiray	Doubles	Bye	Buenrostro / Figueroa (MEX); W 3–0	Vila / Estrella (DOM); W 3–1	Rios / Melendez (PUR); L 0–3	Did not advance	3rd place, bronze medalist(s)
Leonardo Iizulka; Beatriz Fiore	Doubles	Bye	Jutras / Xu (CAN); W 3–0	Rios / Ferrer (VEN); L 0–3	Did not advance		

== Taekwondo ==
Brazil qualified a full team of nine taekwondo practitioners (five men and four women) by virtue of their WT junior world rankings. The team was officially named on April 5, 2025.

Kyorugi

Men

Athlete	Event	Quarterfinals	Semifinals	Final / BM	
Athlete	Event	Opposition Result	Opposition Result	Opposition Result	Rank
Matheus Gilliard	–58 kg	Añazco (PAR); W 2–0	Cortés (MEX); W 2–1	Espínola (ARG); L 1–2	2nd place, silver medalist(s)
Guilherme Morais	–68 kg	Gomez (MEX); W 2–0	Olivero (CHI); L 0–2	Bronze medal final López (URU); L 1–2	=5
Henrique Marques	–80 kg	Massay (USA); W 2–0	Montalvo (BOL); W 2–0	Solis (COL); W 2–0	1st place, gold medalist(s)
Erick Vinicius Batista	+80 kg	Goicochea (CUB); L 1–2	Did not advance	Bronze medal final Trebol (PAR); W 2–0	3rd place, bronze medalist(s)

Women

Athlete	Event	Quarterfinals	Semifinals	Final / BM	
Athlete	Event	Opposition Result	Opposition Result	Opposition Result	Rank
Camilly Gosch	–49 kg	Grippoli (URU); L 1–2	Did not advance	Bronze medal final Mata (USA); L 0–2	=5
Ana Carolina Macedo	–57 kg	Delgado (PUR); W 2–0	Miller (USA); L 0–2	Did not advance	3rd place, bronze medalist(s)
Maria Eduarda Casagrande	–67 kg	Ruiz (ARG); L 1–2	Did not advance		

Mixed

Athlete	Event	Quarterfinals	Semifinals	Final / BM	
Athlete	Event	Opposition Result	Opposition Result	Opposition Result	Rank
Guilherme Morais; Henrique Marques; Camilly Gosch	Team	Bye	Mexico; W 2–0	Colombia; W 2–0	1st place, gold medalist(s)

Poomsae

Athlete	Event	Round of 16	Quarterfinals	Semifinals	Final / BM	
Athlete	Event	Opposition Result	Opposition Result	Opposition Result	Opposition Result	Rank
Willian Rafael de Morais	Men's individual	Jiménez (CRC); W 8.270–8.110	Gun (USA); L 8.400–8.790	Did not advance		
Larissa Thozeski	Women's individual	Nuñez (CRC); L 8.510–8.650	Did not advance			
Willian Rafael de Morais; Larissa Thozeski	Mixed pairs	—N/a			7.880	6

== Tennis ==
Brazil qualified a full team of six tennis players (three men and three women) by virtue of their ITF junior world rankings. The team was officially named on July 25, 2025.

Men

Athlete	Event	Round of 64	Round of 32	Round of 16	Quarterfinal	Semifinal	Final / BM	
Athlete	Event	Opposition Result	Opposition Result	Opposition Result	Opposition Result	Opposition Result	Opposition Result	Rank
Gustavo Albieri	Singles	Bye	De Armas (VEN); W 5–7, 7–5, 6–4	Castellanos (COL); W 6–3, 6–1	Pagani (ARG); L 4–6, 4–6	Did not advance		
João Pedro Bonini	Singles	Bye	Flores (MEX); W 6–4, 6–1	Bolívar (COL); W 4–6, 6–4, 6–4	Núñez (PAR); W 7–6^{(7–4)}, 2–6, 6–4	Álvarez (PUR); W 6–4, 7–6^{(10–8)}	Pagani (ARG); W 3–6, 6–2, 6–3	1st place, gold medalist(s)
Victor Winheski	Singles	Bye	Suarez (BOL); W 6–2, 7–5	Baena (PER); L 4–6, 2–6	Did not advance			
Gustavo Albieri; Victor Winheski	Doubles	—N/a		Bye	De Andreis / De Armas (VEN); W 6–3, 6–3	Camacho / Castro (ECU); L 6–3, 4–6, [4–10]	Bronze medal match Flores / Schtulmann (MEX); W 7–6^{(8–6)}, 6–3	3rd place, bronze medalist(s)

Women

Athlete	Event	Round of 64	Round of 32	Round of 16	Quarterfinal	Semifinal	Final / BM	
Athlete	Event	Opposition Result	Opposition Result	Opposition Result	Opposition Result	Opposition Result	Opposition Result	Rank
Ana Laura Cruz	Singles	Bye	Muelle (PER); L 3–6, 5–7	Did not advance				
Pietra Rivoli	Singles	Bye	Sánchez (COL); W 6–0, 6–3	Rodero (CHI); L 6–2, 4–6, 1–6	Did not advance			
Nathalia Tourinho	Singles	Bye	Balseiro (GUA); W 6–1, 6–2	Larraya (ARG); L 5–7, 2–6	Did not advance			
Ana Laura Cruz; Pietra Rivoli	Doubles	—N/a		Bye	Higuita / Sánchez (COL); L 3–6, 7–5, [5–10]	Did not advance		

Mixed

Athlete	Event	Round of 16	Quarterfinal	Semifinal	Final / BM	
Athlete	Event	Opposition Result	Opposition Result	Opposition Result	Opposition Result	Rank
Gustavo Albieri; Nathalia Tourinho	Doubles	Solis / Velasco (BOL); W 6–4, 7–5	Pagani / Meabe (ARG); L 5–7, 4–6	Did not advance		

== Triathlon ==
Brazil qualified a full team of four triathletes (two men and two women) through the South American Triathlon Qualifier in Encarnación, Paraguay.

Individual

Athlete	Event	Time					Total	Rank
Athlete	Event	Swim (1.5 km)	Trans 1	Bike (40 km)	Trans 2	Run (10 km)	Total	Rank
Cauã Diniz	Men's	10:54	0:43	27:37	0:20	17:27	57:01	14
Vinícius Sant’anna	Men's	10:51	0:41	28:02	0:17	15:14	55:05	6
Maria Clara Cunha	Women's	12:23	0:47	30:35	0:19	20:56	1:05:00	13
Júlia Visgueiro	Women's	11:53	0:49	29:45	0:19	17:22	1:00:08	3rd place, bronze medalist(s)

Relay

Athlete	Event	Time					Total	Rank
Athlete	Event	Swim (300 m)	Trans 1	Bike (7 km)	Trans 2	Run (2 km)	Total	Rank
Júlia Visgueiro	Mixed	5:40	0:50	9:18	0:18	5:15	21:21	—N/a
Vinícius Sant’anna	Mixed	5:38	0:41	8:43	0:21	5:01	20:24	—N/a
Maria Clara Cunha	Mixed	7:28	0:50	10:36	0:22	6:11	25:27	—N/a
Cauã Diniz	Mixed	5:01	0:46	8:49	0:20	5:34	20:30	—N/a
Total	Mixed	—N/a					1:27:42	4

== Volleyball ==
=== Beach ===
Brazil qualified a men's and women's pair for a total of four athletes at the 2025 South American U23 Beach Volleyball Tournament in Cochabamba, Bolivia. The team was officially named on July 2, 2025.

Athlete	Event	Group stage				Round of 16	Quarterfinal	Semifinal	Final / BM	
Athlete	Event	Opposition Result	Opposition Result	Opposition Result	Rank	Opposition Result	Opposition Result	Opposition Result	Opposition Result	Rank
Isac de Farias; Jonathan Menezes	Men's tournament	De Jesús / Maldonado (DOM); W 2–0 (21–13, 21–15)	Duran / Valverde (BOL); W 2–0 (21–14, 21–11)	Araya / Varela (CRC); W 2–1 (21–17, 17–21, 21–19)	1 Q	Bye	Chaput / McGregor (CAN); W 2–0 (21–19, 21–18)	González / Inostroza (ARG); W 2–0 (23–21, 22–20)	Basey / Hurst (USA); L 1–2 (11–21, 21–16, 7–15)	2nd place, silver medalist(s)
Julia Lawrenz; Carol Sallaberry	Women's tournament	Aguilar / Arévalo (GUA); W 2–0 (21–11, 22–20)	López / Rodríguez (VEN); L 1–2 (21–16, 19–21, 12–15)	Molina / Vega (CRC); W 2–0 (21–9, 21–18)	2 Q	Abdala / Najul (ARG); W 2–1 (21–16, 18–21, 15–9)	Brach / Hladyniuk (CAN); L 1–2 (21–16, 13–21, 9–15)	5th–8th place classification Drik / Garrido (CUB); L 0–2 (21–23, 16–21)	Seventh place match Castillo / Romero (PER); W 2–1 (21–12, 19–21, 15–7)	7

=== Indoor ===
Brazil qualified a men's and women's team of 12 athletes each (24 athletes in total).

Summary

Team	Event	Group stage				Quarterfinal	Semifinal	Final / BM / Pl.	
Team	Event	Opposition Result	Opposition Result	Opposition Result	Rank	Opposition Result	Opposition Result	Opposition Result	Rank
Brazil men's	Men's tournament	Dominican Republic; W 3–0	Argentina; W 3–2	Cuba; W 3–0	1 Q	Bye	Cuba; W 3–2	Argentina; W 3–2	1st place, gold medalist(s)
Brazil women's	Women's tournament	Mexico; W 3–1	Chile; W 3–0	Dominican Republic; W 3–1	1 Q	Bye	Dominican Republic; W 3–0	Mexico; W 3–0	1st place, gold medalist(s)

==== Men's tournament ====
Brazil qualified a men's team (of 12 athletes) by virtue of their CSV under-23 ranking.

Roster

The men's team of 12 athletes was officially named on August 16, 2025.

Head coach: Nery Tambeiro

- 1 Lucas Oishi OH
- 2 Gustavo Cardoso S
- 3 Gabriel Ostapechen OH
- 6 Guilherme Amorim OH
- 8 Samuel Neufeld (c) OP
- 9 Marcos Junior Gonçalves OP
- 10 Witallo Oliveira MB
- 12 Thiery Nascimento MB
- 15 Pedro Henrique Souza MB
- 16 Maicon França OH
- 20 Matheus Bandini L
- 22 Juan Pablo Gama S

Preliminary round

Pos	Team	Pld	W	L	Pts	SPW	SPL	SPR	SW	SL	SR
1	Brazil	3	3	0	13	258	218	1.183	9	2	4.500
2	Argentina	3	2	1	9	307	285	1.077	8	6	1.333
3	Cuba	3	1	2	7	241	250	0.964	5	6	0.833
4	Dominican Republic	3	0	3	0	192	245	0.784	1	9	0.111

Source: Asunción 2025

17 August 2025; 17:30	Brazil	3–0	Dominican Republic	COP Arena, Luque
17 August 2025; 17:30	(25–20, 25–17, 25–23); Report			COP Arena, Luque

18 August 2025; 17:30	Brazil	3–2	Argentina	COP Arena, Luque
18 August 2025; 17:30	(27–25, 19–25, 25–14, 22–25, 15–12); Report			COP Arena, Luque

19 August 2025; 17:30	Brazil	3–0	Cuba	COP Arena, Luque
19 August 2025; 17:30	(25–18, 25–19, 25–20); Report			COP Arena, Luque

Semifinal

21 August 2025; 17:30	Brazil	3–2	Cuba	COP Arena, Luque
21 August 2025; 17:30	(14–25, 25–17, 26–24, 23–25, 15–11); Report			COP Arena, Luque

Gold medal match

22 August 2025; 15:00	Brazil	3–2	Argentina	COP Arena, Luque
22 August 2025; 15:00	(22–25, 25–15, 22–25, 27–25, 15–3); Report			COP Arena, Luque

==== Women's tournament ====
Brazil qualified a women's team (of 12 athletes) by virtue of their CSV under-23 ranking.

Roster

The women's team of 16 athletes was officially named on May 19, 2025. The final roster was revealed on August 8, 2025.

Head coach: Marcos Miranda

- 2 Heloise Soares S
- 3 Adria Julia da Silva MB
- 5 Stephany Morete OH
- 4 Julliana Vitoria Gandra (c) MB
- 6 Jaqueline Schmitz OP
- 9 Lívia dos Santos MB
- 10 Camilly Salomé OH
- 11 Maria Clara Carvalhaes S
- 13 Gabriela Carneiro OP
- 16 Maria Clara Andrade OH
- 18 Ana Luiza Rüdiger OH
- 20 Letícia Araújo L

Preliminary round

Pos	Team	Pld	W	L	Pts	SPW	SPL	SPR	SW	SL	SR
1	Brazil	3	3	0	13	268	197	1.360	9	2	4.500
2	Mexico	3	2	1	10	243	235	1.034	7	4	1.750
3	Dominican Republic	3	1	2	7	243	246	0.988	5	6	0.833
4	Chile	3	0	3	0	149	225	0.662	0	9	0.000

Source: Asunción 2025

10 August 2025; 17:30	Brazil	3–1	Mexico	COP Arena, Luque
10 August 2025; 17:30	(25–18, 21–25, 25–15, 25–15); Report			COP Arena, Luque

11 August 2025; 17:30	Brazil	3–0	Chile	COP Arena, Luque
11 August 2025; 17:30	(25–13, 25–14, 25–12); Report			COP Arena, Luque

12 August 2025; 17:30	Dominican Republic	1–3	Brazil	COP Arena, Luque
12 August 2025; 17:30	(17–25, 23–25, 25–22, 20–25); Report			COP Arena, Luque

Semifinal

14 August 2025; 17:30	Brazil	3–0	Dominican Republic	COP Arena, Luque
14 August 2025; 17:30	(25–22, 25–19, 25–13); Report			COP Arena, Luque

Gold medal match

15 August 2025; 15:00	Brazil	3–0	Mexico	COP Arena, Luque
15 August 2025; 15:00	(25–23, 25–19, 25–14); Report			COP Arena, Luque

== Water skiing ==
Brazil qualified a total of two water skiers (one man and one woman) through the 2024 IWWF Pan American Water Ski Championship in Bogotá, Colombia. Brazil also qualified a total of two wakeboarders (one man and one woman) through the 2024 IWWF Pan American Wakeboard Championship in Auburndale, United States.

Water skiing

Men

Athlete	Event	Preliminary		Final				
Athlete	Event	Score	Rank	Slalom	Jump	Tricks	Total	Rank
Philipe Martin Hon	Slalom	0.50/58/13.00	14	Did not advance				

Women

Athlete	Event	Preliminary		Final				
Athlete	Event	Score	Rank	Slalom	Jump	Tricks	Total	Rank
Isabela Giusti	Slalom	3.00/52/18.25	15	Did not advance				

Wakeboard

Athlete	Event	Preliminary		Last Chance Qualifier		Final	
Athlete	Event	Score	Rank	Score	Rank	Score	Rank
Antonio Vasconcelos	Men's	32.45	4	45.00	3	Did not advance	
Livia Sophia Schuler	Women's	41.67	2 Q	Bye		24.44	6

== Weightlifting ==
Brazil qualified a full team of six weightlifters (three men and three women) through the 2025 Junior Pan American Weightlifting Championship in Havana, Cuba. The team was officially named on August 5, 2025.

Men

Athlete	Event	Snatch		Clean & Jerk		Total	Rank
Athlete	Event	Result	Rank	Result	Rank	Total	Rank
Felipe Dias	–88 kg	140	5	173	6	313	6
Matheus Pessanha	–98 kg	168	1	212	1	380 JAR	1st place, gold medalist(s)
Cristhian Izaías	+98 kg	155	2	201	2	356	3rd place, bronze medalist(s)

Women

Athlete	Event	Snatch		Clean & Jerk		Total	Rank
Athlete	Event	Result	Rank	Result	Rank	Total	Rank
Giovanna Tavares	–58 kg	77	5	95	4	172	4
Stephany Assis	–69 kg	98	4	115	4	213	4
Laila Grimaldi	+77 kg	95	5	112	5	207	5

== Wrestling ==
Brazil qualified a full team of 12 wrestlers (seven men and five women) through the 2025 Pan American U23 Wrestling Championship in Querétaro, Mexico.

Key:

- VT (ranking points: 5–0 or 0–5) – Victory by fall.
- VB (ranking points: 5–0 or 0–5) – Victory by injury (VF for forfeit, VA for withdrawal or disqualification)
- PP (ranking points: 3–1 or 1–3) – Decision by points – the loser with technical points.
- PO (ranking points: 3–0 or 0–3) – Decision by points – the loser without technical points.
- ST (ranking points: 4–0 or 0–4) – Great superiority – the loser without technical points and a margin of victory of at least 8 (Greco-Roman) or 10 (freestyle) points.
- SP (ranking points: 4–1 or 1–4) – Technical superiority – the loser with technical points and a margin of victory of at least 8 (Greco-Roman) or 10 (freestyle) points.

Men

Athlete	Event	Group round				Quarterfinal	Semifinal	Final / BM	
Athlete	Event	Opposition Result	Opposition Result	Opposition Result	Rank	Opposition Result	Opposition Result	Opposition Result	Rank
Max França	Freestyle 86 kg	—N/a				Ramos (PAR); W 10–0^{ST}	Welsh (USA); L 2–13^{SP}	Bronze medal final Cardozo (COL); W 10–6^{PP}	3rd place, bronze medalist(s)
Lucas Imbernon	Freestyle 97 kg	Andres (DOM); L 6–8^{PP}	Dineen (USA); L 0–10^{ST}	—N/a	3	Did not advance			
Gabriel de Sousa	Freestyle 125 kg	—N/a				Gomez (PAR); W 4–0^{VT}	Pérez (DOM); W 10–0^{ST}	Stoddard (USA); L 0–10^{ST}	2nd place, silver medalist(s)
Ângelo Café	Greco-Roman 67 kg	—N/a				Cabrera (PAR); W 9–0^{ST}	Veliz (CUB); L 0–8^{ST}	Bronze medal final Hoecke (USA); L 0–4^{VT}	=5
Kauan Gomes	Greco-Roman 87 kg	—N/a				Macias (MEX); L 1–5^{PP}	Did not advance	Bronze medal final Brown (PAN); W 8–0^{ST}	3rd place, bronze medalist(s)
Thalyson Macedo	Greco-Roman 97 kg	—N/a				Balbuena (DOM); W 5–2^{PP}	Diaz (VEN); L 0–9^{ST}	Bronze medal final Gomez (ARG); L 1–4^{PP}	=5
Wesley Barros	Greco-Roman 130 kg	Attao (USA); L 0–6^{VT}	Herrera (MEX); W 12–5^{VT}	Araya (CHI); W 10–0^{ST}	2 Q	—N/a	Talavera (VEN); L 0–5^{PO}	Bronze medal final Nuñez (DOM); W 6–2^{VT}	3rd place, bronze medalist(s)

Women

Athlete	Event	Quarterfinal	Semifinal	Final / BM	
Athlete	Event	Opposition Result	Opposition Result	Opposition Result	Rank
Ana Beatriz Sales	Freestyle 50 kg	Casusol (PER); W 10–0^{ST}	Palacios (MEX); W 6–1^{PP}	Bencosme (CUB); L 0–11^{ST}	2nd place, silver medalist(s)
Kailane Sousa	Freestyle 53 kg	Alvarez (VEN); L 0–10^{ST}	Did not advance	Bronze medal final Gonzalez (USA); L 0–6^{VT}	=5
Mayara Pereira	Freestyle 62 kg	Cosme (USA); L 0–5^{VT}	Did not advance		
Thaís Tertuliano	Freestyle 68 kg	Franco (VEN); L 2–7^{VT}	Did not advance	Bronze medal final Canales (CUB); L 8–11^{PP}	=5
Ilorrany Batista	Freestyle 76 kg	Jimenez (MEX); L 2–13^{SP}	Did not advance		
