= Poe Pinson =

American skateboarder (born 2005)

Ramsey Poe Pinson
Personal information
- Born: March 2, 2005 (age 21) Fernandina Beach, Florida, U.S.

Sport
- Country: United States
- Sport: Street skateboarding
- Rank: 11th
Medal record
Women's Street skateboarding
Representing United States
Junior Pan American Games
Silver medal – second place	2025 Asunción	Street
Bronze medal – third place	2021 Cali-Valle	Street

Poe Pinson (born March 2, 2005) is an American skateboarder. She competed in the women's street event at the 2024 Summer Olympics.

== Skateboarding ==
Pinson represented the United States of America as a member of the USA Skateboarding National Team at the 2024 Summer Olympics, where she competed in the women's street skating and came in 5th.

In August 2024, the Fernandina Beach City Commission voted to name the Fernandina Beach Skate Park after Poe Pinson.
