= Skateboarding at the 2025 Junior Pan American Games =

Skateboarding at the 2025 Junior American Games
- Venue: Skate Park
- Start date: August 10, 2025
- End date: August 11, 2025
- No. of events: 2
- Competitors: 36

The skateboarding events at the 2025 Junior Pan American Games were held at the Skate Park, located in the Olympic Park in Luque, in the Greater Asuncion area. The events were contested between August 10 and 11, 2025.

Two street events were contested, one for men and one for women. The winner of each event qualified for the 2027 Pan American Games in Lima, Peru.

== Qualification ==
A total of 36 athletes qualified for the events (18 men and 18 women). Qualification was based on the World Skate rankings.

== Medal summary ==
=== Medal table ===
* Host nation (Paraguay)

Rank	Nation	Gold	Silver	Bronze	Total
1	Brazil	2	0	1	3
2	United States	0	2	0	2
3	Argentina	0	0	1	1
Totals (3 entries)		2	2	2	6

=== Medalists ===
Event	Gold	Silver	Bronze
Men's street	Filipe Mota; Brazil	Mykle Crawford; United States	Matheus João Mendes; Brazil
Women's street	Maria Lúcia Campos; Brazil	Poe Pinson; United States	Morena Domínguez; Argentina

== Results ==
=== Men's street ===
Semifinal – August 10 / Final – August 11

Rank	Skateboarder	Nation	Semifinal						Final						
Rank	Skateboarder	Nation	Run		Trick			Total	Run			Trick			Total
1st place, gold medalist(s)	Felipe Mota	Brazil	82.88	~~28.55~~	~~87.76~~	~~0.00~~	88.49	171.37	~~70.56~~	85.81	~~0.84~~	87.24	~~0.00~~	~~0.00~~	173.05
2nd place, silver medalist(s)	Mykle Crawford	United States	77.17	~~67.69~~	73.70	~~56.63~~	~~65.24~~	150.87	82.79	~~69.57~~	~~74.58~~	85.53	~~0.00~~	~~0.00~~	168.32
3rd place, bronze medalist(s)	Matheus João Mendes	Brazil	~~61.94~~	71.77	~~74.57~~	83.61	~~0.00~~	153.38	~~74.93~~	81.86	~~28.05~~	~~75.37~~	83.78	~~0.00~~	165.64
4	Matías Floto	Chile	~~49.18~~	56.63	81.18	~~0.00~~	~~0.00~~	137.81	~~61.39~~	~~32.18~~	76.78	~~0.00~~	81.72	~~0.00~~	158.50
5	Juan Polania	Colombia	60.32	~~50.41~~	~~0.00~~	44.37	~~0.00~~	104.69	~~59.34~~	59.76	~~50.53~~	~~0.00~~	~~0.00~~	73.26	133.02
6	Lorenzo Ormazabal	Argentina	54.97	~~37.02~~	51.38	~~50.54~~	~~0.00~~	106.35	~~49.37~~	~~55.87~~	57.06	~~50.85~~	61.22	~~0.00~~	118.28
7	Carlos Puigdollers	Puerto Rico	58.30	~~34.68~~	~~66.36~~	~~0.00~~	75.85	134.15	~~10.34~~	34.29	~~11.05~~	~~0.00~~	~~0.00~~	76.17	110.46
8	Gustavo León	Puerto Rico	55.17	~~25.24~~	59.28	~~0.00~~	~~0.00~~	114.45	~~23.07~~	~~36.30~~	37.29	~~0.00~~	~~0.00~~	0.00	37.29
9	Santiago Muñiz	Mexico	~~22.76~~	34.28	~~56.36~~	69.05	~~0.00~~	103.33	Did not advance						
10	Ian Rengel	Venezuela	25.55	~~23.33~~	~~69.38~~	75.55	~~0.00~~	101.10	Did not advance						
11	Jorge Morales	Peru	25.19	~~17.41~~	75.73	~~0.00~~	~~71.23~~	100.92	Did not advance						
12	Pablo Girola	Argentina	~~24.25~~	32.25	~~0.00~~	65.45	~~61.52~~	97.70	Did not advance						
13	Tlaloc Mondragon	Mexico	33.66	~~29.63~~	56.25	~~0.00~~	~~0.00~~	89.91	Did not advance						
14	Mateo Acevedo	Chile	~~17.97~~	23.50	~~0.00~~	47.21	~~0.00~~	70.71	Did not advance						
15	Victor Melo	Dominican Republic	20.19	~~15.50~~	31.19	~~0.00~~	~~0.00~~	51.38	Did not advance						
16	Saulo Orihuela	Paraguay	~~14.09~~	17.23	~~0.00~~	26.41	~~0.00~~	43.64	Did not advance						
17	Omar Montellano	Bolivia	~~11.68~~	14.55	~~0.00~~	11.50	~~0.00~~	26.05	Did not advance						
18	Francisco Camacho	Uruguay	15.10	~~6.31~~	~~0.00~~	0.00	~~0.00~~	15.10	Did not advance						

=== Women's street ===
Semifinal – August 10 / Final – August 11

Rank	Skateboarder	Nation	Semifinal						Final						
Rank	Skateboarder	Nation	Run		Trick			Total	Run			Trick			Total
1st place, gold medalist(s)	Maria Lúcia Campos	Brazil	~~22.57~~	41.49	~~66.20~~	71.53	~~63.86~~	113.02	~~46.86~~	~~59.47~~	65.86	~~71.97~~	~~0.00~~	85.35	151.21
2nd place, silver medalist(s)	Poe Pinson	United States	54.60	~~42.29~~	~~0.00~~	66.51	~~0.00~~	121.11	~~51.47~~	62.46	~~41.12~~	~~66.57~~	80.85	~~55.20~~	143.31
3rd place, bronze medalist(s)	Morena Domínguez	Argentina	35.97	~~29.31~~	~~0.00~~	30.46	~~0.00~~	66.43	~~42.46~~	47.45	~~32.82~~	~~56.28~~	~~33.46~~	66.36	113.81
4	Esmeralda Butler	Puerto Rico	~~30.25~~	33.42	~~0.00~~	70.12	~~0.00~~	103.54	41.01	~~31.49~~	~~36.20~~	70.43	~~0.00~~	~~0.00~~	114.44
5	Daniela Vitória	Brazil	~~18.94~~	34.45	~~0.00~~	~~0.00~~	64.35	98.80	~~36.19~~	48.55	~~44.35~~	~~54.15~~	60.17	~~0.00~~	108.72
6	Ailin Arzua	Argentina	28.97	~~20.92~~	50.11	~~28.74~~	~~0.00~~	79.08	~~34.90~~	43.87	~~40.11~~	51.34	~~29.26~~	~~0.00~~	95.21
7	Vianez Morales	Puerto Rico	~~20.86~~	27.08	~~0.00~~	54.35	~~34.29~~	81.43	~~26.26~~	~~17.85~~	27.67	54.55	~~34.84~~	~~0.00~~	82.22
8	Julieta González	Uruguay	25.03	~~18.29~~	69.35	~~0.00~~	~~0.00~~	94.38	~~29.45~~	50.69	~~6.40~~	~~0.00~~	0.00	~~0.00~~	50.69
9	María José Cabrera	Mexico	~~22.90~~	25.33	33.71	~~0.00~~	~~0.00~~	59.04	Did not advance						
10	Luna Garzón	Colombia	21.50	~~4.66~~	36.01	~~34.30~~	~~0.00~~	57.51	Did not advance						
11	Julieta Arayas	Chile	12.30	~~4.72~~	~~28.97~~	~~0.00~~	33.96	46.26	Did not advance						
12	Kiara Oropeza	Peru	~~4.65~~	14.19	31.57	~~0.00~~	~~0.00~~	45.76	Did not advance						
13	Emiliana Pereyra	Uruguay	15.25	~~6.05~~	~~25.24~~	~~0.00~~	27.44	42.69	Did not advance						
14	Itzel Farias	Mexico	20.56	~~16.85~~	~~0.00~~	~~0.00~~	2.60	23.16	Did not advance						
15	Ambar Silverio	Dominican Republic	3.96	~~2.20~~	~~0.00~~	9.81	~~0.00~~	13.77	Did not advance						
16	Matilde Mainguyague	Chile	~~1.15~~	9.26	~~0.00~~	0.00	~~0.00~~	9.26	Did not advance						
17	Natania Farfang	Peru	8.10	~~4.31~~	0.00	~~0.00~~	~~0.00~~	8.10	Did not advance						
18	Veruska Tovar	Venezuela	7.57	~~6.29~~	0.00	~~0.00~~	~~0.00~~	7.57	Did not advance						
