= Saint Lucia at the 2025 Junior Pan American Games =

- IOC code: LCA
- NOC: Saint Lucia Olympic Committee

in Asunción, Paraguay 9 August 2025 – 23 August 2025
- Competitors: 2 in 1 sport
- Medals: Gold 0 Silver 0 Bronze 0 Total 0

Junior Pan American Games appearances (overview)
- 2021; 2025

Saint Lucia competed at the 2025 Junior Pan American Games in Asunción, Paraguay, from 9 to 23 August 2025.

The Saint Lucian team consisted of two athletes competing in one sport.

== Competitors ==
The following is the list of number of competitors participating at the Games per sport/discipline.

Sport	Men	Women	Total
Table tennis	2	0	2
Total	2	0	2

== Table tennis ==
Saint Lucia qualified two athletes.

Men

Athlete	Event	Group stage				Round of 32	Round of 16	Quarterfinal	Semifinal	Final / BM	
Athlete	Event	Opposition Result	Opposition Result	Opposition Result	Rank	Opposition Result	Opposition Result	Opposition Result	Opposition Result	Opposition Result	Rank
Joshua Lubin	Singles	—N/a				Iizuka (BRA) L 0–4	Did not advance				
Manie Eleuthere	Singles	—N/a				Tovar (VEN) L 0–4	Did not advance				
Manie Eleuthere; Joshua Lubin	Doubles	—N/a					Bertolo / Pastore (PAR) L 0–3	Did not advance			
Manie Eleuthere; Joshua Lubin	Team	Paraguay L 0–3	Canada L 0–3	Puerto Rico L 0–3	4	—N/a		Did not advance			
