= Fencing at the 2025 Junior Pan American Games =

Fencing at the 2025 Junior American Games
- Venue: SND Complex
- Start date: August 10, 2025
- End date: August 12, 2025
- No. of events: 6
- Competitors: 96

The fencing events at the 2025 Junior Pan American Games were held at the Block 2, located in the Secretaría Nacional de Deportes Complex in Asunción. The events were contested between August 10 and 12, 2025.

Six events were contested, three for men and three for women. The winner of each event qualified for the 2027 Pan American Games in Lima, Peru.

== Qualification ==
A total of 96 athletes qualified for the events. Qualification was based on the results from the 2025 Youth Pan American Championship, held in Asunción, Paraguay.

== Medal summary ==
=== Medal table ===
* Host nation (Paraguay)

Rank	Nation	Gold	Silver	Bronze	Total
1	Peru	1	0	2	3
2	Puerto Rico	1	0	1	2
2	Venezuela	1	0	1	2
4	Bolivia	1	0	0	1
4	Chile	1	0	0	1
4	Virgin Islands	1	0	0	1
7	United States	0	2	2	4
8	Brazil	0	1	3	4
9	Argentina	0	1	0	1
9	Guatemala	0	1	0	1
9	Mexico	0	1	0	1
12	Costa Rica	0	0	1	1
12	Panama	0	0	1	1
12	Paraguay*	0	0	1	1
Totals (14 entries)		6	6	12	24

=== Medalists ===
==== Men ====
Event	Gold	Silver	Bronze
Individual épée	Kruz Schembri; Virgin Islands	Matheus Brandt; Brazil	Isaac Dorati; Panama
Individual épée	Kruz Schembri; Virgin Islands	Matheus Brandt; Brazil	Daniel Gao; United States
Individual foil	Renzo Furukawa; Peru	Cristian Perez; Guatemala	Sebastian Garcia; Puerto Rico
Individual foil	Renzo Furukawa; Peru	Cristian Perez; Guatemala	Jayden Hooshi; United States
Individual sabre	Esteban Meyer; Bolivia	William Lim; United States	Lukas Eichhorn; Peru
Individual sabre	Esteban Meyer; Bolivia	William Lim; United States	Marcus Pinto; Brazil

==== Women ====
Event	Gold	Silver	Bronze
Individual épée	Victoria Guerrero; Venezuela	Ana Paredes; Mexico	Janine Hanspach; Paraguay
Individual épée	Victoria Guerrero; Venezuela	Ana Paredes; Mexico	Luna Fernandez; Costa Rica
Individual foil	Rafaela Santibáñez; Chile	Iris Yang; United States	Livia Burberry; Brazil
Individual foil	Rafaela Santibáñez; Chile	Iris Yang; United States	Natalia Machado; Venezuela
Individual sabre	Gabriela Hwang; Puerto Rico	Catalina Borrelli; Argentina	Maria Karina Altamirano; Peru
Individual sabre	Gabriela Hwang; Puerto Rico	Catalina Borrelli; Argentina	Ana Beatriz Fraga; Brazil

== Results ==
=== Men's individual épée ===
Date: August 11

Round of 16
Kruz Schembri (ISV)	15
Daniel Bravo (MEX)	5
Eduardo Martínez (GUA)	10
Javier Carmona (CHI)	15
Isaac Dorati (PAN)	15
Alexis Molina (ESA)	8
Marcos García (PER)	9
Miguel Figueroa (VEN)	15
Matheus Brandt (BRA)	15
Andre Emden (PUR)	8
Jorge Cabrera (CRC)	9
Iván Groupierre (ARG)	15
Daniel Gao (USA)	15
Merardo Bernal (PAR)	6
Marlon García (CUB)	10
Bayardo Naranjo (ECU)	15

Quarterfinals
Kruz Schembri (ISV)	15
Javier Carmona (CHI)	7
Isaac Dorati (PAN)	15
Miguel Figueroa (VEN)	8
Matheus Brandt (BRA)	15
Iván Groupierre (ARG)	10
Daniel Gao (USA)	15
Bayardo Naranjo (ECU)	8

Semifinals
Kruz Schembri (ISV)	15
Isaac Dorati (PAN)	8
Matheus Brandt (BRA)	15
Daniel Gao (USA)	8

Final
Kruz Schembri (ISV)	15
Matheus Brandt (BRA)	7

=== Men's individual foil ===
Date: August 12

Round of 16
Renzo Furukawa (PER)	15
Ethan Yelpo (URU)	3
Darick Galicia (MEX)	15
Snayker Antonelli (VEN)	7
Isaac Camayo (COL)	15
Sebastián Acosta (CRC)	6
Adrián Álvarez (DOM)	5
Jayden Hooshi (USA)	15
Cristián Porras (GUA)	15
Juan Mateo Galvez (BOL)	8
Giorgio Fumagalli (BRA)	12
Francisco Naranjo (CHI)	15
Franco Marchetti (ARG)	4
Sebastián García (PUR)	15
Franco Gallardo (PAR)	6
Tomás Aguinaga (ECU)	15

Quarterfinals
Renzo Furukawa (PER)	15
Darick Galicia (MEX)	3
Isaac Camayo (COL)	12
Jayden Hooshi (USA)	15
Cristián Porras (GUA)	15
Francisco Naranjo (CHI)	10
Sebastián García (PUR)	15
Tomás Aguinaga (ECU)	9

Semifinals
Renzo Furukawa (PER)	15
Jayden Hooshi (USA)	14
Cristián Porras (GUA)	15
Sebastián García (PUR)	10

Final
Renzo Furukawa (PER)	15
Cristián Porras (GUA)	6

=== Men's individual sabre ===
Date: August 10

Round of 16
Yunior Balón (CUB)	Bye
Mark Trukhmanov (ARG)	12
Lukas Eichhorn (PER)	15
Esteban Mayer (BOL)	15
Andy Rodriguez (CRC)	8
José Daniel Valencia (ECU)	5
Santiago Delgado (MEX)	15
Marcus Pinto (BRA)	15
Gonzalo Ruiz (PAR)	12
Pedro Clemente (VEN)	14
Emilio Vargas (COL)	15
Gaspar Latham (CHI)	15
Surya Mattoo (PUR)	11
Shea Martin (JAM)	7
William Lim (USA)	15

Quarterfinals
Yunior Balón (CUB)	10
Lukas Eichhorn (PER)	15
Esteban Mayer (BOL)	15
Santiago Delgado (MEX)	4
Marcus Pinto (BRA)	15
Emilio Vargas (COL)	12
Gaspar Latham (CHI)	6
William Lim (USA)	15

Semifinals
Lukas Eichhorn (PER)	14
Esteban Mayer (BOL)	15
Marcus Pinto (BRA)	14
William Lim (USA)	15

Final
William Lim (USA)	13
Esteban Mayer (BOL)	15

=== Women's individual épée ===
Date: August 10

Round of 16
Ana Paredes (MEX)	Bye
Andrea Waller (PUR)	7
Laura Correia (BRA)	15
Janine Hanspach (PAR)	15
Eva Bottazzini (ARG)	8
Camila Arauz (BOL)	10
Simóne Combatti (CHI)	15
Victoria Guerrero (VEN)	15
Agustina Cuello (URU)	3
María Sol Naranjo (ECU)	15
Helena Linares (HON)	3
Isabella González (COL)	15
María Paz Yañez (PER)	5
Denise Solórzano (GUA)	5
Luna Fernandez (CRC)	15

Quarterfinals
Ana Paredes (MEX)	15
Laura Correia (BRA)	14
Janine Hanspach (PAR)	15
Simóne Combatti (CHI)	8
Victoria Guerrero (VEN)	15
María Sol Naranjo (ECU)	7
Isabella González (COL)	12
Luna Fernandez (CRC)	13

Semifinals
Ana Paredes (MEX)	15
Janine Hanspach (PAR)	13
Victoria Guerrero (VEN)	13
Luna Fernandez (CRC)	9

Final
Ana Paredes (MEX)	7
Victoria Guerrero (VEN)	15

=== Women's individual foil ===
Date: August 11

Round of 16
Iris Yang (USA)	Bye
Stephanie Cap (GUA)	8
Mariana Soriano (PER)	15
María Caterina Correa (ARG)	15
Jewel Crump (ANT)	3
Victoria Montaño (BOL)	6
Livia Burberry (BRA)	15
Natalia Machado (VEN)	15
Christina Okenve (JAM)	0
Mya Hernández (PUR)	2
Kristin Naranjo (ECU)	15
Irene Mena (ESA)	15
Tamara Oropeza (MEX)	7
Gabriela Sotelo (PAR)	2
Rafaela Santibáñez (CHI)	15

Quarterfinals
Iris Yang (USA)	15
Mariana Soriano (PER)	6
María Caterina Correa (ARG)	9
Livia Burberry (BRA)	15
Natalia Machado (VEN)	15
Kristin Naranjo (ECU)	14
Irene Mena (ESA)	2
Rafaela Santibáñez (CHI)	15

Semifinals
Iris Yang (USA)	15
Livia Burberry (BRA)	7
Natalia Machado (VEN)	12
Rafaela Santibáñez (CHI)	15

Final
Iris Yang (USA)	10
Rafaela Santibáñez (CHI)	15

=== Women's individual sabre ===
Date: August 12

Round of 16
Gabriela Hwang (PUR)	15
Violeta Escanlar (URU)	0
Briana Iriarte (BOL)	13
Constanza Manso (CHI)	15
María Karina Galindo (PER)	15
Isabella Cambronero (CRC)	6
Aurora Barrera (GUA)	5
Delilah Huai (USA)	15
Ariana Prieto (VEN)	15
Magdy García (ESA)	3
Luciana García (PAR)	11
Ana Beatriz Fraga (BRA)	15
Catalina Borrelli (ARG)	15
Ana Carvajal (MEX)	5
Mía González (DOM)	1
Isabella Triana (COL)	15

Quarterfinals
Gabriela Hwang (PUR)	15
Constanza Manso (CHI)	0
María Karina Galindo (PER)	15
Delilah Huai (USA)	13
Ariana Prieto (VEN)	13
Ana Beatriz Fraga (BRA)	15
Catalina Borrelli (ARG)	15
Isabella Triana (COL)	10

Semifinals
Gabriela Hwang (PUR)	15
María Karina Galindo (PER)	3
Ana Beatriz Fraga (BRA)	14
Catalina Borrelli (ARG)	15

Final
Gabriela Hwang (PUR)	15
Catalina Borrelli (ARG)	8
