= Virgin Islands at the 2025 Junior Pan American Games =

- IOC code: ISV
- NOC: Virgin Islands Olympic Committee

in Asunción, Paraguay
- Competitors: 6 in 3 sports
- Medals: Gold 1 Silver 2 Bronze 0 Total 3

Junior Pan American Games appearances (overview)
- 2021; 2025

The United States Virgin Islands competed at the 2025 Junior Pan American Games in Asunción from August 9 to 23, 2025.

The Virgin Islander team consisted of 6 athletes competing in 3 sports.

This was the first time the Virgin Islands won a gold medal at any Pan American Games edition, achieved by Kruz Schembri in fencing.

== Medals by sport ==
Sport	Gold	Silver	Bronze	Total
Fencing	1	0	0	1
Athletics	0	1	0	1
Swimming	0	1	0	1
Totals (3 entries)	1	2	0	3

== Medalists ==
The following U.S. Virgin Islander competitors won medals at the games.

Medal	Name	Sport	Event	Date
Gold	Kruz Schembri	Fencing	Men's individual épée	August 11
Silver	Maximillian Wilson	Swimming	Men's 100m backstroke	August 12
Silver	Michelle Smith	Athletics	Women's 400m Hurdles	August 20

== See also ==
- Virgin Islands at the Junior Pan American Games
