= 2025 Junior Pan American Games =

2nd edition of the Junior Pan American Games

II Junior Pan American Games
- Logo of the 2025 Junior Pan American Games
- Host: Asunción, Paraguay
- Motto: The Heart in the Games; Spanish: El Corazón en los Juegos
- Nations: 41
- Athletes: 3,975
- Events: 336 in 28 sports
- Opening: August 9
- Closing: August 23
- Opened by: Santiago Peña
- Cauldron lighter: Fabrizio Zanotti
- Main venue: Defensores del Chaco Stadium (opening); Olympic Park (closing)

The 2025 Junior Pan American Games (Spanish: Juegos Panamericanos Junior 2025), also named Asu 2025, were the second edition of the Junior Pan American Games, an international multi-sports event for athletes aged 17 to 22 in the Americas, organized by Panam Sports. It was held in Asunción, Paraguay between August 9 and 23, 2025. It was the first time that the Pan American Games, either senior or junior, took place in Paraguay.

== Bidding process ==
Three cities expressed interest in hosting the games:

- Asunción, Paraguay: At the beginning of the 2022 South American Games, held in Asunción, the President of Paraguay Mario Abdo Benítez announced that the country's capital was being submitted as the host city for the Junior Games with the intention of reusing the infrastructure used for the South American Games.
- Lima, Peru: In 2022, Mayor of Lima Miguel Romero Sotelo, supported by the Peruvian Olympic Committee and the Peruvian Institute of Sport, presented a project submitting Lima as the host city for the games. Infractructure used at the 2019 Pan American Games was expected to be reused for the Junior Games.
- Santa Marta, Colombia: The city was submitted as the host city, celebrating the future 500th anniversary of the city in 2025. The Junior Games would serve as practice for future bids for other multi-sport events.

The voting process took place on 28 November 2022, at an assembly in Miami, United States. Asunción and Santa Marta were the only official contenders as Lima withdrew its bid a few days before the assembly. With 32 votes over 16, Asunción was chosen as the host city for the games.

2025 Junior Pan American Games bidding results
City	NOC	Round 1
Asunción	Paraguay	32
Santa Marta	Colombia	16

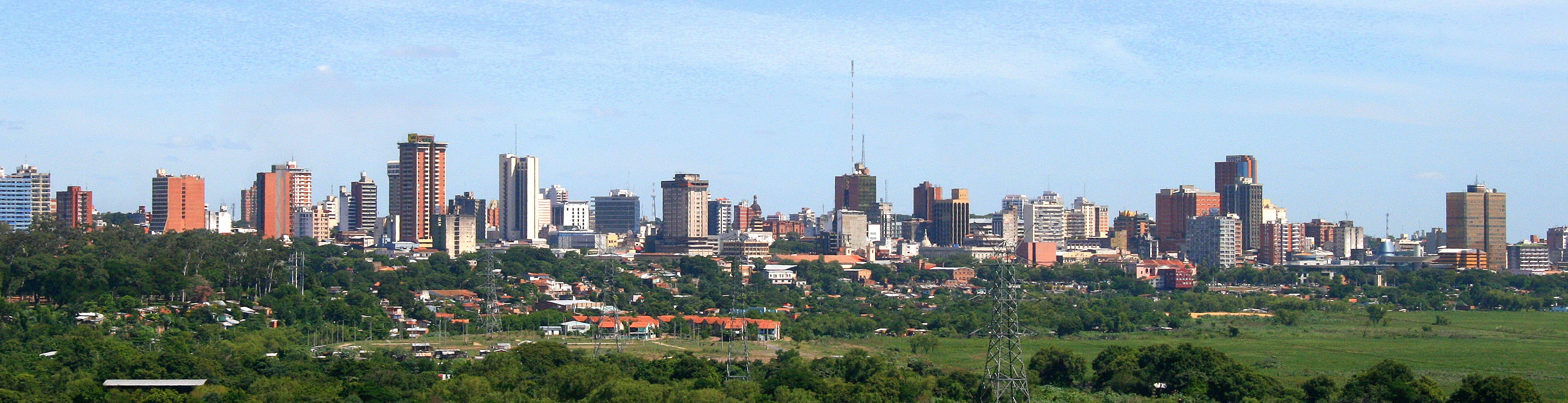
Asunción, Paraguay was selected as the host city of the 2025 Junior Pan American Games

== Venues ==
Most events took place in venues within Asunción and Luque, with especific events at independent venues located in Ypacaraí and Encarnación.

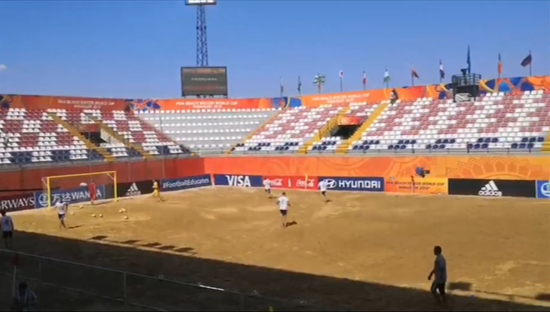
Beach volleyball took place at Los Pynandi World Cup Stadium, located inside the Parque Olímpico.

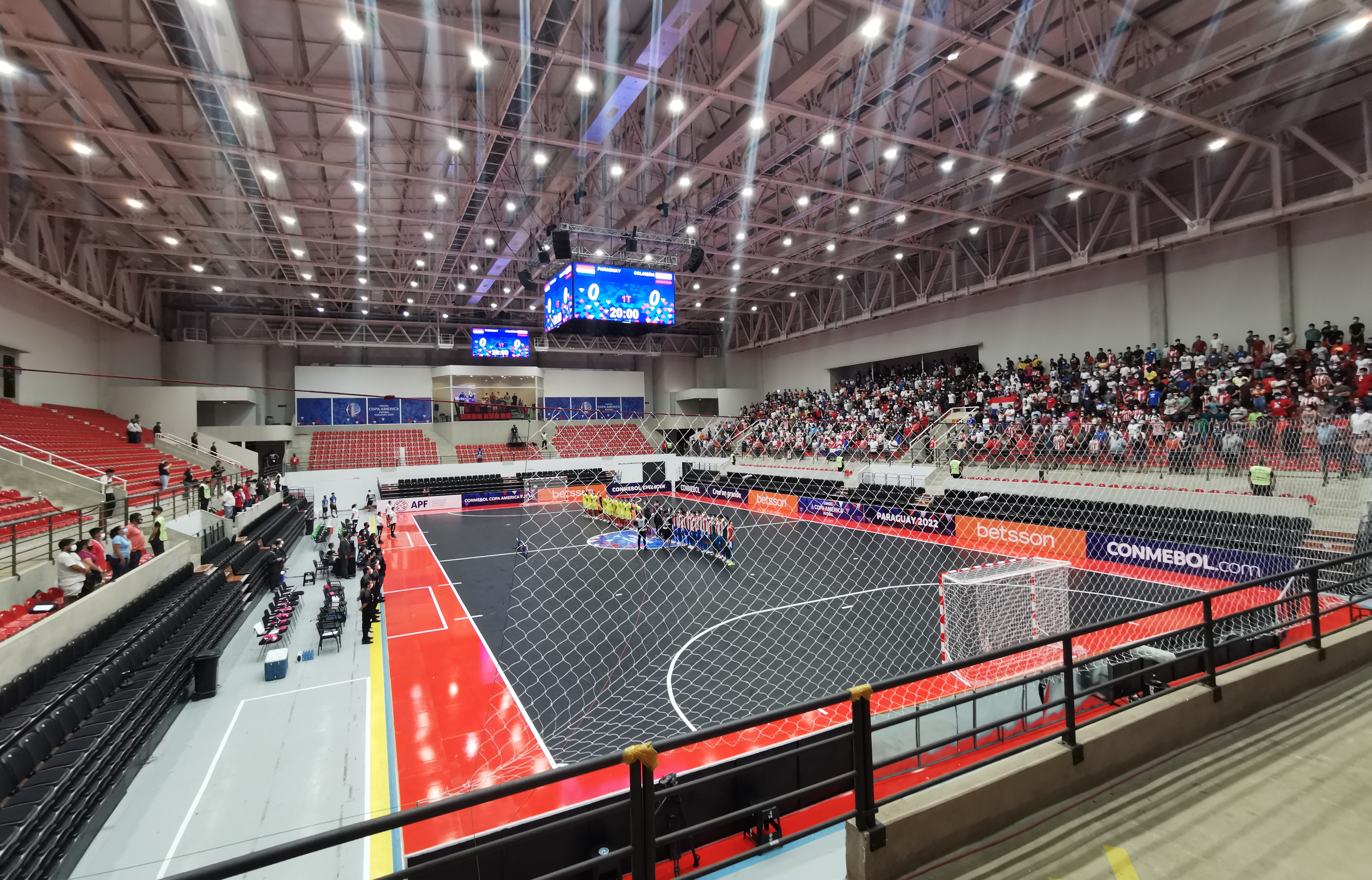
Handball will take place at SND Arena, within the Secretaría Nacional de Deportes.

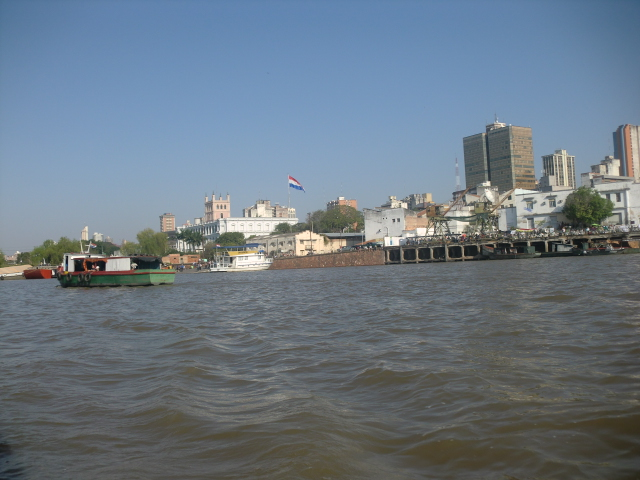
Asunción Bay.

Venue		City	Sports
Parque Olímpico	Los Pynandi World Cup Stadium	Luque	Beach volleyball
Parque Olímpico	National Hockey Centre	Luque	Field hockey
Parque Olímpico	National Skating Centre	Luque	Speed skating
Parque Olímpico	National Archery Centre	Luque	Archery
Parque Olímpico	Olympic Training Centre	Luque	3x3 basketball Judo; Karate; Wrestling; Taekwondo
Parque Olímpico	Olympic Aquatic Centre	Luque	Swimming; Diving; Artistic swimming
Parque Olímpico	Estadio Héroes de Curupayty	Luque	Rugby sevens
Parque Olímpico	BMX Park	Luque	BMX racing
Parque Olímpico	Athletics Track	Luque	Athletics
Parque Olímpico	Skatepark	Luque	Skateboarding
Parque Olímpico	Shooting Range	Luque	Shooting
Parque Olímpico	Velodrome	Luque	Track cycling Artistic skating
Secretaría Nacional de Deportes	SND Stadium	Asunción	Badminton; Weightlifting
Secretaría Nacional de Deportes	Block 2	Asunción	Fencing
Secretaría Nacional de Deportes	National Squash Centre	Asunción	Squash
Secretaría Nacional de Deportes	Paraguayan Volleyball Federation	Asunción	Volleyball
Secretaría Nacional de Deportes	Gymnastics Pavilion	Asunción	Gymnastics
Secretaría Nacional de Deportes	Table Tennis Stadium	Asunción	Table tennis
Secretaría Nacional de Deportes	SND Arena	Asunción	Handball
Costanera Avenue (North)		Asunción	Road cycling
Asunción Bay		Asunción	Rowing; Canoeing
Asunción Golf Club		Asunción	Golf
Rakiura Resort		Luque	Tennis
Manene Lake		Ypacaraí	Water skiing
San José Beach		Encarnación	Open water swimming Triathlon; Sailing
Club Agua Vista		San Juan del Paraná	Mountain biking

== The Games ==
=== Sports ===
336 events in 28 sports were contested. The full sport program was confirmed in 2024. For the 2025 edition, six disciplines were added: open water swimming, BMX freestyle, water skiing, golf, field hockey and rugby sevens. Sports included for the previous editions but dropped for the present were baseball/softball, bowling, boxing and modern pentathlon.

- 3x3 basketball (2)
- Aquatics
  - Artistic swimming (3)
  - Diving (10)
  - Open water swimming (2)
  - Swimming (36)
- Archery (8)
- Athletics (45)
- Badminton (3)
- Canoeing
  - Canoe sprint (16)
- Cycling
  - BMX racing (2)
  - BMX freestyle (2)
  - Mountain biking (2)
  - Road (4)
  - Track (12)
- Fencing (6)
- Field hockey (2)
- Golf (3)
- Gymnastics
  - Artistic gymnastics (14)
  - Rhythmic gymnastics (8)
  - Trampoline (4)
- Handball (2)
- Judo (15)
- Karate (10)
- Roller sports
  - Artistic skating (4) (details)
  - Skateboarding (2)
  - Speed skating (10) (details)
- Rowing (13)
- Rugby sevens (2)
- Sailing (5)
- Shooting (11)
- Squash (7)
- Table tennis (7)
- Taekwondo (12)
- Tennis (5)
- Triathlon (3)
- Volleyball
  - Beach volleyball (2)
  - Volleyball (2)
- Water skiing (10)
- Weightlifting (12)
- Wrestling (18)
  - Freestyle
  - Greco-Roman

=== Participating National Olympic Committees ===
All 41 nations who are members of the Panam Sports competed at this edition with a total of 3,975 athletes. The numbers in parentheses represents the number of athletes competed.

Participating National Olympic Committees
- Antigua and Barbuda (10)
- Argentina (341)
- Aruba (13)
- Bahamas (15)
- Barbados (27)
- Belize (5)
- Bermuda (24)
- Bolivia (55)
- Brazil (362)
- British Virgin Islands (3)
- Canada (157)
- Cayman Islands (14)
- Chile (284)
- Colombia (215)
- Costa Rica (74)
- Cuba (224)
- Dominica (3)
- Dominican Republic (95)
- Ecuador (111)
- El Salvador (63)
- Grenada (10)
- Guatemala (123)
- Guyana (35)
- Haiti (5)
- Honduras (14)
- Jamaica (84)
- Mexico (377)
- Nicaragua (18)
- Panama (33)
- Paraguay (327) (Host)
- Peru (114)
- Puerto Rico (109)
- Saint Lucia (2)
- Saint Kitts and Nevis (5)
- Saint Vincent and the Grenadines (4)
- Suriname (7)
- Trinidad and Tobago (74)
- United States (220)
- Uruguay (126)
- Venezuela (175)
- Virgin Islands (9)

== Schedule ==
OC	Opening ceremony	●	Event competitions	1	Event finals	CC	Closing ceremony

August		9 Sat	10 Sun	11 Mon	12 Tue	13 Wed	14 Thu	15 Fri	16 Sat	17 Sun	18 Mon	19 Tue	20 Wed	21 Thu	22 Fri	23 Sat	Events
Ceremonies (opening / closing)		OC														CC	—N/a
3x3 basketball								●	●	2							2
Aquatics	Artistic swimming												●		2	1	3
Aquatics	Diving								2	2	2	4					10
Aquatics	Open water swimming									2							2
Aquatics	Swimming		8	8	8	6	6										36
Archery			●	●	8												8
Athletics											8	6	10	10	11		45
Badminton			●	●	●	3											3
Canoeing													4	4	2	6	16
Cycling	BMX		●	2										●	2		4
Cycling	Mountain biking		2														2
Cycling	Road		2							2							4
Cycling	Track				4	2	2	4									12
Fencing			2	2	2												6
Field hockey			●	●	●	●	●	●	●	●	1	1					2
Golf												●	1	●	●	2	3
Gymnastics	Artistic											2	2	5	5		14
Gymnastics	Rhythmic			●	2	6											8
Gymnastics	Trampoline			●	4												4
Handball			●	●	●	●	●	1	●	●	●	●	●	●	1		2
Judo			5	4	5	1											15
Karate														4	4	2	10
Roller sports	Artistic													●	4		4
Roller sports	Skateboarding		●	2													2
Roller sports	Speed										4	4	2				10
Rowing		●	5	1	3	4											13
Rugby sevens									●	2							2
Sailing								●	●	5							5
Shooting		●	4	4	3												11
Squash				●	2	●	3	●	2								7
Table tennis									●	1	4	●	●	2			7
Taekwondo								4	4	4							12
Tennis				●	●	●	●	2	3								5
Triathlon													2	1			3
Volleyball	Beach										●	●	●	●	2		2
Volleyball	Indoor		●	●	●	●	●	1	●	●	●	●	●	●	1		2
Water skiing											●	●	6	4			10
Weightlifting													4	3	3	2	12
Wrestling													6	6	6		18
Total events		0	28	23	41	22	11	12	11	20	19	17	37	39	43	13	0
Cumulative total		0	28	51	92	114	125	137	148	168	187	204	241	280	323	336	336
		9 Sat	10 Sun	11 Mon	12 Tue	13 Wed	14 Thu	15 Fri	16 Sat	17 Sun	18 Mon	19 Tue	20 Wed	21 Thu	22 Fri	23 Sat	Events

== Medal table ==
The official medal table:

* Host nation (Paraguay)

Rank	Nation	Gold	Silver	Bronze	Total
1	Brazil	70	50	55	175
2	United States	54	43	45	142
3	Colombia	48	27	40	115
4	Mexico	29	45	55	129
5	Argentina	27	38	30	95
6	Canada	19	21	23	63
7	Cuba	19	13	15	47
8	Chile	18	19	28	65
9	Venezuela	12	15	19	46
10	Puerto Rico	7	7	13	27
11	Guatemala	7	3	4	14
12	Ecuador	6	13	14	33
13	Jamaica	4	5	6	15
14	Paraguay*	3	6	14	23
15	Peru	3	5	15	23
16	Uruguay	1	6	6	13
17	Trinidad and Tobago	1	2	8	11
18	Dominican Republic	1	2	5	8
19	Virgin Islands	1	2	0	3
20	Bolivia	1	1	4	6
21	Bahamas	1	1	2	4
21	Nicaragua	1	1	2	4
21	Panama	1	1	2	4
24	Aruba	1	1	0	2
25	Cayman Islands	1	0	1	2
26	Dominica	1	0	0	1
26	Haiti	1	0	0	1
28	Bermuda	0	2	1	3
28	El Salvador	0	2	1	3
30	British Virgin Islands	0	1	1	2
30	Grenada	0	1	1	2
32	Barbados	0	1	0	1
33	Guyana	0	0	3	3
34	Costa Rica	0	0	1	1
Totals (34 entries)		338	334	414	1,086

== Broadcasting ==
The competitions are accessible globally via the Panam Sports Channel website and are also broadcast by rights-holding media partners in various countries.

Territory	Rights holder
Argentina	TyC Sports, DeporTV
Brazil	BandSports (cable), Brazilian Olympic Committee Channel and CazéTV (streaming)
Caribbean	Rush Sports
Canada	Fanatiz
Colombia	Win Sports
Costa Rica	Trivisión
Cuba	Tele Rebelde
Chile	Chilevisión, Televisión Nacional de Chile, Canal 13, Zapping, CDO, NTV
Ecuador	Zapping
Europe	ANOC TV
Mexico	TVC
Panamá	Medcom, TVN Media, Ser TV, COS Cable
Paraguay	Unicanal, Trece, Tigo Sports, Paraguay TV
Peru	Movistar Deportes, Zapping
Puerto Rico	Telemundo
Spain	Fanatiz
United States	Fanatiz
Uruguay	Canal 5
Venezuela	TVes

== See also ==
- 2026 Summer Youth Olympics
- 2027 Pan American Games
