= Cycling at the 2025 Junior Pan American Games =

Cycling at the 2025 Junior American Games
- Venues: National Olympic Velodrome (Track); Costanera Sur (road); BMX Park (BMX race and freestyle); Club Agua Vista (mountain biking)
- Start date: August 10, 2025
- End date: August 22, 2025
- No. of events: 22

The cycling events at the 2025 Junior Pan American Games were contested between August 10 and 22, 2025. The track cycling and BMX events were held at the National Olympic Velodrome and BMX Park of the Olympic Park, respectively. Both venues are located in the Olympic Park in Luque, in the Greater Asuncion area. The road cycling events took place in Costanera Sur, also located in Asunción, while the mountain biking events were held at Club Agua Vista in Encarnación.

22 events were contested: BMX racing (2), BMX freestyle (2), mountain biking (2), road cycling (4) and track cycling (12). BMX freestyle was one of the six disciplined added for the 2025 games. The winner of each event qualified for the 2027 Pan American Games in Lima, Peru.

== Qualification ==
The UCI Elite Individual and UCI U23 and Junior rankings determined the qualified athletes for the BMX freestyle and racing events, respectively. For mountain biking, the XCO Pan American Championship, held in Costa Rica, plus continental zones results served as qualification events. Road cycling qualification was based on continental championships while athletes qualified for the track cycling events via a Nations ranking and the 2025 Elite Pan American Championship, held in Paraguay.

== Medal summary ==
=== Medal table ===
* Host nation (Paraguay)

Rank	Nation	Gold	Silver	Bronze	Total
1	Colombia	13	4	4	21
2	Argentina	3	8	3	14
3	Mexico	2	3	2	7
4	Chile	2	2	2	6
5	United States	1	2	1	4
6	Brazil	1	0	3	4
7	Venezuela	0	1	2	3
8	Ecuador	0	1	0	1
8	Uruguay	0	1	0	1
10	Trinidad and Tobago	0	0	5	5
Totals (10 entries)		22	22	22	66

=== Medalists ===
==== Road cycling ====
Event	Gold	Silver	Bronze
Men's road race	José Prieto; Mexico	Ciro Pérez; Uruguay	Iván Salmon; Argentina
Men's time trial	Samuel Flórez; Colombia	José Prieto; Mexico	Juan Quintero; Colombia
Women's road race	Julieta Benedetti; Argentina	Verónica Revelo; Ecuador	Natalia Garzón; Colombia
Women's time trial	Natalia Garzón; Colombia	Julieta Benedetti; Argentina	Delfina Dibella; Argentina

==== Track cycling ====
Event	Gold	Silver	Bronze
Men's sprint	Nicolás Olivera; Colombia	Alberto Torres; Venezuela	Alejo Betique; Argentina
Men's team sprint	Colombia; Francisco Jaramillo; Nicolás Olivera; John Beltrán	Mexico; Jafet López; Etan Nuño; Ian Navarro	Trinidad and Tobago; Danell James; Jelani Nedd; Ryan D'Abreau
Men's keirin	Nicolás Olivera; Colombia	Matías Murillo; Argentina	Danell James; Trinidad and Tobago
Men's omnium	Santiago Gruñeiro; Argentina	Diego Rojas; Chile	Arlex Mendez; Venezuela
Men's madison	Colombia; Miguel Marín; Jerónimo Calderón	Mexico; Fernando Nava; Marcelo Garza	Brazil; Pedro Miguel Freitas; Luan Carlos Rodrigues
Men's team pursuit	Chile; Diego Rojas; Martín Mancilla; Josafat Cárdenas; Raimundo Carvajal	Argentina; Santiago Gruñeiro; Mateo Duque; Agustín Ferrari; Ramiro Videla	Mexico; Fernando Nava; Marcelo Garza; Kevin Ortega; Arath Sánchez
Women's sprint	Stefany Cuadrado; Colombia	Marianis Salazar; Colombia	Makaira Wallace; Trinidad and Tobago
Women's team sprint	Colombia; Stefany Cuadrado; Marianis Salazar; Nathalia Martínez	Argentina; Guadalupe Díaz; Valentina Méndez; Valentina Luna	Trinidad and Tobago; Phoebe Sandy; Makaira Wallace; Kyra Williams
Women's keirin	Stefany Cuadrado; Colombia	Marianis Salazar; Colombia	Makaira Wallace; Trinidad and Tobago
Women's omnium	Luciana Osorio; Colombia	Julieta Benedetti; Argentina	Javiera Garrido; Chile
Women's madison	Colombia; Luciana Osorio; Natalia Garzón	Chile; Javiera Garrido; Marlén Rojas	Venezuela; Olviangel Castillo; Yeniret Roa
Women's team pursuit	Chile; Javiera Garrido; Maite Ibarra; Martina Rojas; Marlén Rojas	Colombia; Luciana Osorio; Karen González; Jennifer Sánchez; Natalia Garzón	Mexico; Nicole Cordova; María Figueroa; Viviana Arriaga; Giovana López

==== Mountain biking ====
Event	Gold	Silver	Bronze
Men's cross-country	Iván Aguilar; Mexico	Nicolás Reynoso; Argentina	Eiki Yamauchi; Brazil
Women's cross-country	Luiza Cocuzzi; Brazil	Lucía Miralles; Argentina	María Salamanca; Colombia

==== BMX racing ====
Event	Gold	Silver	Bronze
Men's	Federico Capello; Argentina	Ethan Popovich; United States	Evan Esposito; United States
Women's	Alexis Alden; United States	Derin Merten; United States	Sharid Fayad; Colombia

==== BMX freestyle ====
Event	Gold	Silver	Bronze
Men's	Saúl Hernández; Colombia	Manuel Turone; Argentina	Davi Henrique Sodré; Brazil
Women's	Queen Saray Villegas; Colombia	Lizsurley Villegas; Colombia	Catalina Henríquez; Chile

== Results ==
=== Road cycling ===
==== Men's road race ====
Final – August 17

Rank	Rider	Nation	Time
1st place, gold medalist(s)	José Prieto	Mexico	3:18:34
2nd place, silver medalist(s)	Ciro Pérez	Uruguay	3:18:34
3rd place, bronze medalist(s)	Ivan Salmón	Argentina	3:18:34
4	Cristián Velez	Colombia	3:18:57
5	Derrick Chavarría	Belize	3:18:57
6	Winston Maestre	Venezuela	3:18:57
7	Mateo Duque	Argentina	3:23:26
8	Jonathan Guatibonza	Colombia	3:23:26
9	Luiz Fernando Bomfim	Brazil	3:23:26
10	Ramiro Videla	Argentina	3:23:26
11	Heriberto Quiroz	Mexico	3:23:26
12	Randol Izquierdo	Cuba	3:23:26
13	Diego Mendez	Venezuela	3:23:26
14	Carlos Domínguez	Paraguay	3:23:26
15	Sergio Farfan	Peru	3:23:26
16	Kevin Navas	Ecuador	3:23:26
17	Melvin Torres	Guatemala	3:23:26
18	Jadian Neaves	Trinidad and Tobago	3:23:26
19	José Pedro Trillat	Chile	3:23:26
20	Agustín Ferrari	Argentina	3:23:26
21	Samuel Flórez	Colombia	3:23:26
22	Miguel Marín	Colombia	3:23:26
23	Kenny Chaves	Costa Rica	3:23:26
24	Martín Mancilla	Chile	3:23:26
25	Michael Caballero	Panama	3:23:26
26	Wilson Sanon	Haiti	3:23:26
27	Héctor Menendez	Honduras	3:23:26
28	José Alberto Domínguez	Cuba	3:23:26
29	Amed Marcos	Cuba	3:23:26
30	Pablo Bonilla	Uruguay	3:23:26
31	Felipe Reyes	Uruguay	3:23:26
32	Facundo Revetria	Uruguay	3:23:26
33	Alejandro Pita	Ecuador	3:23:26
34	Vicente Cárdenas	Chile	3:23:26
35	José Pablo Sancho	Costa Rica	3:23:44
36	Bruno Zachar	Paraguay	3:23:44
37	Facundo Arias	Chile	3:23:44
38	Dario Rabinal	Guatemala	3:29:51
39	Jhosue Moreno	Paraguay	3:35:18
	Pedro Miguel Freitas	Brazil	DNF
	Marcelo Garza	Mexico	DNF
	Jesús Goyo	Venezuela	DNF
	Luan Carlos Rodrigues	Brazil	DNF
	Arath Sánchez	Mexico	DNF
	Ryan D'Abreau	Trinidad and Tobago	DNF
	Arlex Mendez	Venezuela	DNS
	Antonio Alfonso	Paraguay	DNS

==== Women's road race ====
Final – August 17

Rank	Rider	Nation	Time
1st place, gold medalist(s)	Julieta Benedetti	Argentina	2:51:19
2nd place, silver medalist(s)	Verónica Revelo	Ecuador	2:51:19
3rd place, bronze medalist(s)	Natalia Garzón	Colombia	2:51:19
4	Yeniret Roa	Venezuela	2:51:19
5	Marcela Peñafiel	Ecuador	2:51:19
6	Karen González	Colombia	2:52:02
7	Luciana Osorio	Colombia	2:52:02
8	Olviangel Castillo	Venezuela	2:52:02
9	Javiera Garrido	Chile	2:52:02
10	Angie Londoño	Colombia	2:52:02
11	Florencia Revetria	Uruguay	2:52:02
12	Liannis Mesa	Cuba	2:52:02
13	Renata Guerra	Mexico	2:52:02
14	Melisa Ávila	Costa Rica	2:52:02
15	Karen Martínez	Cuba	2:52:02
16	Delfina Dibella	Argentina	2:52:02
17	Yendry Quesada	Costa Rica	2:52:02
18	Romina Rodríguez	Uruguay	2:52:02
19	Flor Espiritusanto	Dominican Republic	2:52:02
20	Noemi Atencio	Panama	2:52:02
21	Melsey Pérez	Dominican Republic	2:52:02
22	Nicole Cordova	Mexico	2:52:02
23	María Fernanda Figueroa	Mexico	2:52:02
24	Marlen Rojas	Chile	2:52:02
25	Martina Torres	Chile	2:52:02
26	Daniela Moncada	Venezuela	2:52:02
27	Valeria León	Mexico	2:52:02
28	Amalia Medina	Chile	2:52:02
29	Hiayra Leonardo	Guatemala	2:52:02
30	Eylin Delgado	Cuba	2:52:02
31	Fabiana Candelas	Venezuela	2:52:02
32	Charlotte Millington	Bermuda	2:52:02
33	Abril Garzón	Argentina	2:52:34
34	Diandra Ramírez	Costa Rica	2:52:58
35	Eyseli Rodríguez	Cuba	2:53:07
36	Valentina Luna	Argentina	2:57:40
37	Yailin Gómez	Costa Rica	3:03.50
38	Xiomara Morales	Uruguay	3:03.50
39	Nataly Agustín	Guatemala	3:03.50
	Kami Roach	Bahamas	OVL
	Jazmín Puac	Guatemala	DNF
	Sindy Servin	Paraguay	DNF

==== Men's time trial ====
Final – August 13

Rank	Rider	Nation	Time
1st place, gold medalist(s)	Samuel Flórez	Colombia	49:09.13
2nd place, silver medalist(s)	José Prieto	Mexico	49:23.25
3rd place, bronze medalist(s)	Juan Quintero	Colombia	49:40.02
4	Kevin Navas	Ecuador	50:08.62
5	José Pablo Sancho	Costa Rica	50:36.85
6	Facundo Arias	Chile	50:45.33
7	Octavio Salmón	Argentina	51:33.93
8	Carlos Dominguez	Paraguay	52:01.26
9	Luan Carlos Rodrigues	Brazil	52:01.59
10	Luiz Fernando Bomfim	Brazil	52:04.73
11	Heriberto Quiroz	Mexico	52:09.11
12	Jesús Goyo	Venezuela	52:41.80
13	Loyd Rivera	Puerto Rico	53:18.21
14	Michael Caballero	Panama	53:27.91
15	Amed Marcos	Cuba	54:05.51
16	Dario Rabinal	Guatemala	54:34.39
17	Pablo Bonilla	Uruguay	54:37.82
18	Kenny Chaves	Costa Rica	58:44.45
	Mateo Kalejman	Argentina	DSQ

==== Women's time trial ====
Final – August 13

Rank	Rider	Nation	Time
1st place, gold medalist(s)	Natalia Garzón	Colombia	36:43.32
2nd place, silver medalist(s)	Julieta Benedetti	Argentina	37:06.03
3rd place, bronze medalist(s)	Delfina Dibella	Argentina	37:43.99
4	Natalia Vasquez	Ecuador	38:38.94
5	Luciana Osorio	Colombia	38:48.32
6	Liannis Mesa	Cuba	39:17.79
7	Fabiana Candelas	Venezuela	39:26.43
8	Martina Torres	Chile	39:49.38
9	Renata Guerra	Mexico	39:53.89
10	Diandra Ramírez	Costa Rica	40:35.48
11	Florencia Revetria	Uruguay	40:36.28
12	Jazmin Puac	Guatemala	40:37.45
13	Charlotte Milington	Bermuda	40:56.76
14	Valeria León	Mexico	41:26.77
15	Karen Martínez	Cuba	41:39.82
16	Melissa Avila	Costa Rica	42:43.71
17	Noemy Atencio	Panama	42:44.68
18	Flor Espiritusanto	Dominican Republic	43:36.35
19	Kami Roach	Bahamas	49:38.66

=== Track cycling ===
==== Men's sprint ====
Qualifying – August 13

Rank	Name	Nation	Time	Notes
1	Nicolás Olivera	Colombia	9.934	Q
2	Francisco Jaramillo	Colombia	9.952	Q
3	Alberto Torres	Venezuela	10.083	Q
4	Alejo Betique	Argentina	10.194	Q
5	Danell James	Trinidad and Tobago	10.299	Q
6	Jafet López	Mexico	10.342	Q
7	Iñaki Serrano	Argentina	10.405	Q
8	Sergio Garces	Venezuela	10.440	Q
9	Etan Nuño	Mexico	10.443	Q
10	Jelani Nedd	Trinidad and Tobago	10.509	Q
11	Maikel Cifrán	Cuba	10.704	Q
12	Xavi Wadilie	Suriname	10.821	Q
13	Isaías Melgarejo	Paraguay	11.074	
14	Brian Woronieski	Paraguay	11.624	

Eightfinals – August 13

Heat	Rank	Name	Nation	Time	Notes
1	1	Nicolás Olivera	Colombia	10.702	Q
1	2	Xavi Wadilie	Suriname	10.900	
2	1	Francisco Jaramillo	Colombia	11.041	Q
2	2	Maikel Cifrán	Cuba	11.150	
3	1	Alberto Torres	Venezuela	10.777	Q
3	2	Jelani Nedd	Trinidad and Tobago	11.490	
4	1	Alejo Betique	Argentina	10.844	Q
4	2	Etan Nuño	Mexico	11.099	
5	1	Danell James	Trinidad and Tobago	10.711	'Q
5	2	Sergio Garces	Venezuela	10.761	
6	1	Jafet López	Mexico	10.458	Q
6	2	Iñaki Serrano	Argentina	10.518	

Repechage – August 13

Heat	Rank	Name	Nation	Time	Notes
1	1	Etan Nuño	Mexico	10.716	Q
1	2	Sergio Garces	Venezuela	10.824	
1	3	Xavi Wadilie	Suriname	10.976	
2	1	Iñaki Serrano	Argentina	10.690	Q
2	2	Jelani Nedd	Trinidad and Tobago	10.713	
2	3	Maikel Cifrán	Cuba	10.743	

Quarterfinals – August 13

Heat	Rank	Name	Nation	R1	R2	D	Notes
1	1	Nicolás Olivera	Colombia	W	W		Q
1	2	Iñaki Serrano	Argentina				
2	1	Francisco Jaramillo	Colombia	W	W		Q
2	2	Etan Nuño	Mexico				
3	1	Alberto Torres	Venezuela	W	W		Q
3	2	Jafet López	Mexico				
4	1	Alejo Betique	Argentina	W		W	Q
4	2	Danell James	Trinidad and Tobago		W		

Semifinals – August 13

Heat	Rank	Name	Nation	R1	R2	D	Notes
1	1	Nicolás Olivera	Colombia	W	W		Q
1	2	Alejo Betique	Argentina				
2	1	Alberto Torres	Venezuela	W	W		Q
2	2	Francisco Jaramillo	Colombia				

Final – August 13

Rank	Name	Nation	R1	R2	D	Notes
Gold Medal Race
1st place, gold medalist(s)	Nicolás Olivera	Colombia	W	W		
2nd place, silver medalist(s)	Alberto Torres	Venezuela	W	W		
Bronze Medal Race
3rd place, bronze medalist(s)	Alejo Betique	Argentina	W			
4	Francisco Jaramillo	Colombia		W		

==== Men's team sprint ====
Qualifying – August 12

Rank	Nation	Time	Notes
1	Colombia; Francisco Jaramillo; Nicolás Olivera; John Beltrán	45.280	QG
2	Mexico; Jafet López; Etan Nuño; Ian Navarro	45.689	QG
3	Trinidad and Tobago; Danell James; Jelani Nedd; Ryan D'Abreau	46.142	QB
4	Venezuela; Sergio Garces; Alberto Torres; Moises Ramos	47.578	QB
5	Paraguay; Isaías Melgarejo; Brian Woronieski; Marcos Harder	49.849	
REL	Argentina; Alejo Betique; Matías Murillo; Iñaki Serrano		

Final – August 12

Rank	Nation	Time	Notes
Gold Medal Race
1st place, gold medalist(s)	Colombia; Francisco Jaramillo; Nicolás Olivera; John Beltrán	44.788	
2nd place, silver medalist(s)	Mexico; Jafet López; Etan Nuño; Ian Navarro	45.355	
Bronze Medal Race
3rd place, bronze medalist(s)	Trinidad and Tobago; Danell James; Jelani Nedd; Ryan D'Abreau	46.216	
4	Venezuela; Sergio Garces; Alberto Torres; Moises Ramos	47.307	

==== Men's keirin ====
First Round – August 15

Rank	Nation	Time	Notes
Heat 1
1	Nicolás Olivera	Colombia	Q
2	Alejo Betique	Argentina	Q
3	Ryan D'Abreau	Trinidad and Tobago	Q
4	Jafet López	Mexico	
5	Xavi Wadilie	Suriname	
6	Sergio Garces	Venezuela	
7	Isaías Megarejo	Paraguay	
Heat 2
1	Danell James	Trinidad and Tobago	Q
2	Matías Murillo	Argentina	Q
3	Alberto Torres	Venezuela	Q
4	Etan Nuño	Mexico	
5	Francisco Jaramillo	Colombia	
6	Maikel Cifrán	Cuba	
7	Brian Woronieski	Paraguay	

Final – August 15

Rank	Nation	Time	Notes
Gold Medal Race
1st place, gold medalist(s)	Nicolás Olivera	Colombia	
2nd place, silver medalist(s)	Matías Murillo	Argentina	
3rd place, bronze medalist(s)	Danell James	Trinidad and Tobago	
4	Ryan D'Abreau	Trinidad and Tobago	
5	Alejo Betique	Argentina	
6	Alberto Torres	Venezuela	
Places 7–12
7	Francisco Jaramillo	Colombia	
8	Etan Nuño	Mexico	
9	Jafet López	Mexico	
10	Sergio Garces	Venezuela	
11	Xavi Wadilie	Suriname	
12	Isaías Megarejo	Paraguay	

==== Men's omnium ====
Final Classification – August 15

Rank	Name	Nation	Scratch	Tempo	Elimination	Points Race	Total
1st place, gold medalist(s)	Santigo Gruñeiro	Argentina	36	38	22	50	146
2nd place, silver medalist(s)	Diego Rojas	Chile	24	32	36	48	140
3rd place, bronze medalist(s)	Arlex Mendez	Venezuela	34	34	30	24	122
4	Miguel Marín	Colombia	30	40	38	12	120
5	Ciro Pérez	Uruguay	26	28	34	31	119
6	Fernando Nava	Mexico	38	30	40	5	113
7	José Alberto Domínguez	Cuba	32	36	28	9	105
8	Luan Carlos Rodrigues	Brazil	40	26	32	-5	93
9	Carlos Domínguez	Paraguay	28	24	24	-15	61
10	Sergio Farfan	Peru	22	22	26	-40	30

==== Men's madison ====
Final Classification – August 15

Rank	Name	Nation	Laps points	Sprint points	Total points
1st place, gold medalist(s)	Miguel Marín; Jerónimo Calderón	Colombia	45	40	85
2nd place, silver medalist(s)	Fernando Nava; Marcelo Garza	Mexico	37	20	57
3rd place, bronze medalist(s)	Luan Carlos Rodrigues; Pedro Miguel Freitas	Brazil	19	0	19
4	Mateo Duque; Agustín Ferrari	Argentina	17	-20	-3
5	Diego Rojas; Martín Mancilla	Chile	16	-20	-4
6	Facundo Revetria; Felipe Reyes	Uruguay	0	-20	DNF
6	Carlos Domínguez; Bruno Zachar	Paraguay	0	-40	DNF
6	José Alberto Domínguez; Amed Marcos	Cuba	0	-59	DNF
	Arlex Mendez; Winston Maestre	Venezuela	0	0	ABD

==== Men's team pursuit ====
Qualifying – August 12

Rank	Nation	Time	Notes
1	Chile; Diego Rojas; Martín Mancilla; Josafat Cárdenas; Raimundo Carvajal	4:03.878	QG
2	Argentina; Santiago Gruñeiro; Mateo Duque; Agustín Ferrari; Ramiro Videla	4:10.138	QG
3	Mexico; Fernando Nava; Marcelo Garza; Kevin Ortega; Arath Sánchez	4:11.120	QB
4	Venezuela; Arlex Méndez; Winston Maestre; Jesús Goyo; Diego Méndez	4:12.956	QB
5	Colombia; Miguel Marín; Jerónimo Calderón; Samuel Flórez; Juan Quintero	4:15.338	
6	Paraguay; Carlos Domínguez; Antonio Alfonso; Abraham Carballo; Bruno Zachar	4:23.900	

Final – August 12

Rank	Nation	Time	Notes
Gold Medal Race
1st place, gold medalist(s)	Chile; Diego Rojas; Martín Mancilla; Josafat Cárdenas; Raimundo Carvajal	3:00.676	
2nd place, silver medalist(s)	Argentina; Santiago Gruñeiro; Mateo Duque; Agustín Ferrari; Ramiro Videla	3:05.159	
Bronze Medal Race
3rd place, bronze medalist(s)	Mexico; Fernando Nava; Marcelo Garza; Kevin Ortega; Arath Sánchez	4:10.729	
4	Venezuela; Arlex Méndez; Winston Maestre; Jesús Goyo; Diego Méndez	4:17.383	

==== Women's sprint ====
Qualifying – August 14

Rank	Name	Nation	Time	Notes
1	Stefany Cuadrado	Colombia	10.623	Q
2	Marianis Salazar	Colombia	10.999	Q
3	Valentina Méndez	Argentina	11.259	Q
4	Makaira Wallace	Trinidad and Tobago	11.293	Q
5	Phoebe Sandy	Trinidad and Tobago	11.436	Q
6	Yoheris Moreno	Venezuela	11.569	Q
7	Naharai Neira	Chile	11.800	Q
8	Carliany Martínez	Venezuela	11.852	Q
9	Vanessa González	Mexico	11.863	Q
10	Keila Leal	Cuba	12.091	Q
11	Guadalupe Díaz	Argentina	12.165	Q
12	Andrea Cantú	Mexico	12.242	Q
13	Kelly Gómez	Chile	12.593	
14	Melaika Russell	Jamaica	12.789	

Eightfinals – August 14

Heat	Rank	Name	Nation	Time	Notes
1	1	Stefany Cuadrado	Colombia	12.00	Q
1	2	Andrea Cantú	Mexico	12.058	
2	1	Marianis Salazar	Colombia	12.053	Q
2	2	Guadalupe Díaz	Argentina	12.360	
3	1	Valentina Méndez	Argentina	12.146	Q
3	2	Keila Leal	Cuba	12.468	
4	1	Makaira Wallace	Trinidad and Tobago	11.747	Q
4	2	Carliany Martínez	Venezuela	12.872	
5	1	Phoebe Sandy	Trinidad and Tobago	12.104	Q
5	2	Vanessa González	Mexico	REL	
6	1	Yoheris Moreno	Venezuela	11.865	Q
6	2	Naharai Neira	Chile	12.453	

Repechage – August 14

Heat	Rank	Name	Nation	Time	Notes
1	1	Carliany Martínez	Venezuela	12.317	Q
1	2	Vanessa González	Mexico	12.334	
1	3	Andrea Cantú	Mexico	12.461	
2	1	Guadalupe Díaz	Argentina	12.273	Q
2	2	Keila Leal	Cuba	12.369	
2	3	Naharai Neira	Chile	12.546	

Quarterfinals – August 14

Heat	Rank	Name	Nation	R1	R2	D	Notes
1	1	Stefany Cuadrado	Colombia	W	W		Q
1	2	Guadalupe Díaz	Argentina				
2	1	Marianis Salazar	Colombia	W	W		Q
2	2	Carliany Martínez	Venezuela				
3	1	Valentina Méndez	Argentina		W	W	Q
3	2	Yoheris Moreno	Venezuela	W			
4	1	Makaira Wallace	Trinidad and Tobago	W	W		Q
4	2	Phoebe Sandy	Trinidad and Tobago				

Semifinals – August 14

Heat	Rank	Name	Nation	R1	R2	D	Notes
1	1	Stefany Cuadrado	Colombia	W	W		Q
1	2	Makaira Wallace	Trinidad and Tobago				
2	1	Marianis Salazar	Colombia	W	W		Q
2	2	Valentina Méndez	Argentina				

Final – August 14

Rank	Name	Nation	R1	R2	D	Notes
Gold Medal Race
1st place, gold medalist(s)	Stefany Cuadrado	Colombia	W	W		
2nd place, silver medalist(s)	Marianis Salazar	Colombia				
Bronze Medal Race
3rd place, bronze medalist(s)	Makaira Wallace	Trinidad and Tobago	W	W		
4	Valentina Méndez	Argentina				

==== Women's team sprint ====
Qualifying – August 12

Rank	Nation	Time	Notes
1	Colombia; Stefany Cuadrado; Marianis Salazar; Nathalia Martínez	49.200	QG
2	Argentina; Guadalupe Díaz; Valentina Mendez; Valentina Luna	50.433	QG
3	Trinidad and Tobago; Phoebe Sandy; Makaira Wallace; Kyra Williams	50.541	QB
4	Venezuela; Carliany Martínez; Jalymar Rodríguez; Yoheris Moreno	51.840	QB
5	Mexico; Andrea Cantú; Carla Dosamante; Vanessa González	52.255	
6	Chile; Kelly Gómez; Naharai Neira; Constanza Flores	53.773	

Final – August 12

Rank	Nation	Time	Notes
Gold Medal Race
1st place, gold medalist(s)	Colombia; Stefany Cuadrado; Marianis Salazar; Nathalia Martínez	48.595	
2nd place, silver medalist(s)	Argentina; Guadalupe Díaz; Valentina Mendez; Valentina Luna	50.032	
Bronze Medal Race
3rd place, bronze medalist(s)	Trinidad and Tobago; Phoebe Sandy; Makaira Wallace; Kyra Williams	50.145	
4	Venezuela; Carliany Martínez; Jalymar Rodríguez; Yoheris Moreno	51.622	

==== Women's keirin ====
First Round – August 15

Rank	Nation	Time	Notes
Heat 1
1	Marianis Salazar	Colombia	Q
2	Makaira Wallace	Trinidad and Tobago	Q
3	Carliany Martínez	Venezuela	Q
4	Naharai Neira	Chile	
5	Carla Dosamante	Mexico	
6	Valentina Méndez	Argentina	
7	Keila Leal	Cuba	
Heat 2
1	Stefany Cuadrado	Colombia	Q
2	Jalymar Rodríguez	Venezuela	Q
3	Phoebe Sandy	Trinidad and Tobago	Q
4	Guadalupe Díaz	Argentina	
5	Andrea Cantú	Mexico	
6	Kelly Gómez	Chile	

Final – August 15

Rank	Nation	Time	Notes
Gold Medal Race
1st place, gold medalist(s)	Stefany Cuadrado	Colombia	
2nd place, silver medalist(s)	Marianis Salazar	Colombia	
3rd place, bronze medalist(s)	Makaira Wallace	Trinidad and Tobago	
4	Jalymar Rodríguez	Venezuela	
5	Phoebe Sandy	Trinidad and Tobago	
6	Carliany Martínez	Venezuela	
Places 7–12
7	Guadalupe Díaz	Argentina	
8	Andrea Cantú	Mexico	
9	Naharai Neira	Chile	
10	Valentina Méndez	Argentina	
11	Carla Dosamante	Mexico	
12	Keila Leal	Cuba	

==== Women's omnium ====
Final Classification – August 15

Rank	Name	Nation	Scratch	Tempo	Elimination	Points Race	Total
1st place, gold medalist(s)	Luciana Osorio	Colombia	40	36	40	18	134
2nd place, silver medalist(s)	Julieta Benedetti	Argentina	36	38	36	21	131
3rd place, bronze medalist(s)	Javiera Garrido	Chile	38	34	38	11	121
4	Olviangel Castillo	Venezuela	34	32	30	17	113
5	Ana Paula Finco	Brazil	30	40	34	2	106
6	Liannis Mesa	Cuba	28	28	32	-14	74
7	Sindy Servin	Paraguay	24	26	28	0	DNF
	Romina Rodríguez	Uruguay	26	DNF	DNS		ABD
	Jazmin Puac	Guatemala	DNF	DNS	DNS		ABD
	María Figueroa	Mexico	32	30	DNS		ABD

==== Women's madison ====
Final Classification – August 15

Rank	Name	Nation	Laps points	Sprint points	Total points
1st place, gold medalist(s)	Luciana Osorio; Natalia Garzón	Colombia	37	20	57
2nd place, silver medalist(s)	Javiera Garrido; Marlén Rojas	Chile	29	20	49
3rd place, bronze medalist(s)	Olviangel Castillo; Yeniret Roa	Venezuela	0	22	22
4	María Figueroa; Viviana Arriaga	Mexico	3	0	3
5	Ludmila Aguirre; Abril Garzón	Argentina	8	-20	-12
6	Ana Paula Finco; Ana Júlia Santos	Brazil	0	-40	-40
	Liannis Mesa; Karen Martínez	Cuba	0	-20	DNF
	Phoebe Sandy; Alexia Wilson	Trinidad and Tobago	0	-20	DNF

==== Women's team pursuit ====
Qualifying – August 12

Rank	Nation	Time	Notes
1	Chile; Javiera Garrido; Maite Ibarra; Marlén Rojas; Martina Rojas	4:35.013	QG
2	Colombia; Luciana Osorio; Karen González; Jennifer Sánchez; Natalia Garzón	4:37.907	QG
3	Mexico; María Figueroa; Viviana Arriaga; Nicole Cordova; Giovana López	4:50.240	QB
4	Argentina; Julieta Benedetti; Ludmila Aguirre; Abril Garzón; Bianca Tempestini	4:51.710	QB
5	Venezuela; Olviangel Castillo; Fabiana Candelas; Yeniret Roa; Daniela Moncada	4:51.954	
6	Cuba; Liannis Mesa; Karen Martínez; Eylin Delgado; Eyseli Rodríguez	5:11.256	

Final – August 12

Rank	Nation	Time	Notes
Gold Medal Race
1st place, gold medalist(s)	Chile; Javiera Garrido; Maite Ibarra; Marlén Rojas; Martina Rojas	3:23.531	
2nd place, silver medalist(s)	Colombia; Luciana Osorio; Karen González; Jennifer Sánchez; Natalia Garzón	3:30.275	
Bronze Medal Race
3rd place, bronze medalist(s)	Mexico; María Figueroa; Viviana Arriaga; Nicole Cordova; Giovana López	4:49.192	
4	Argentina; Julieta Benedetti; Ludmila Aguirre; Abril Garzón; Bianca Tempestini	4:51.710	

=== Mountain biking ===
==== Men's cross-country ====
Final – August 10

Rank	Rider	Nation	Time
1st place, gold medalist(s)	Iván Aguilar	Mexico	1:16.53
2nd place, silver medalist(s)	Nicolás Reynoso	Argentina	1:17.42
3rd place, bronze medalist(s)	Eiki Yamauchi	Brazil	1:17.58
4	Antonio Gómez	Colombia	1:21.21
5	Nils Gutiérrez	Mexico	1:21.42
6	Edison Serrano	Peru	1:21.43
7	Jared Méndez	Costa Rica	1:22.01
8	Maximiliano San Martín	Chile	1:22.03
9	Isaias Morales	Venezuela	1:23.00
10	Facundo Cayata	Argentina	1:23.12
11	Matías Urzúa	Chile	1:23.29
12	Jonathan Aguilar	Costa Rica	1:24.40
13	Ángel Hernández	Venezuela	1:28.34
14	Gabriel Saenz	Guatemala	–1LAP
15	Jhosue Moreno	Paraguay	–1LAP
16	Randol Izquierdo	Cuba	–2LAP
17	Ransi de los Santos	Dominican Republic	–3LAP
18	Johan Gómez	Colombia	–4LAP
	Elias Armoa	Paraguay	DNF
	Ángel Rodríguez	Puerto Rico	DNS

==== Women's cross-country ====
Final – August 10

Rank	Rider	Nation	Time
1st place, gold medalist(s)	Luiza Cocuzzi	Brazil	1:17.55
2nd place, silver medalist(s)	Lucía Miralles	Argentina	1:18.17
3rd place, bronze medalist(s)	María Salamanca	Colombia	1:18.32
4	Florencia Monsálvez	Chile	1:18.58
5	Laura Cagua	Colombia	1:20.18
6	Yosselin Morales	Mexico	1:20.24
7	Amalia Medina	Chile	1:20.35
8	Nicole Arce	Argentina	1:22.58
9	María Flores	Mexico	1:23.30
10	Marisol García	Costa Rica	1:25.21
11	Isabel García	Costa Rica	1:26.11
12	Daniela Machuca	Ecuador	1:29.34
13	Nataly Agustín	Guatemala	–1LAP
14	Valeria Briceño	Venezuela	–1LAP
15	Hiayra Leonardo	Guatemala	–2LAP
16	Feline Mendoza	Dominican Republic	–3LAP
	Giuliana Morgen	Brazil	DNF
	María Cabrales	Cuba	DNF

=== BMX racing ===
==== Men's race ====
Seeding run – August 21

Rank	Name	Nation	Time
1	Juan Velásquez	Colombia	33.057
2	Thomas Maturano	Argentina	33.074
3	Ethan Popovich	United States	33.217
4	Lucas Zimmermann	Brazil	33.820
5	Federico Capello	Argentina	33.911
6	Juan Lopez	Colombia	34.374
7	Evan Esposito	United States	34.432
8	Franco Mendizabal	Ecuador	35.139
9	Ignacio Mangual	Puerto Rico	35.141
10	Raydex Bolaños	Venezuela	35.524
11	Edgar Rodarte	Mexico	35.652
12	Ignacio Aguilera	Chile	36.143
13	Sebastian Ordoñez	Bolivia	36.163
14	Jeremy Marchena	Dominican Republic	36.184
15	Kingman Koochoy	Peru	36.340
16	Boris Duque	Guatemala	38.938
17	Javier Martínez	Paraguay	42.292
18	Xander Escobar	Venezuela	DNS

Quarterfinals – August 22

Rank	Name	Nation	Race 1	Race 2	Race 3	Total	Notes
Heat 1
1	Juan Velásquez	Colombia	33.716 (1)	33.820 (1)	33.339 (1)	3	Q
2	Juan Lopez	Colombia	34.180 (3)	34.110 (2)	33.729 (2)	7	Q
3	Evan Esposito	United States	33.958 (2)	34.150 (3)	34.258 (3)	8	Q
4	Ignacio Aguilera	Chile	37.392 (5)	35.580 (4)	34.841 (4)	13	Q
5	Sebastian Ordoñez	Bolivia	35.724 (4)	37.178 (5)	35.772 (5)	14	
6	Xander Escobar	Venezuela	DNS (8)	DNS (8)	DNS (8)	24	
Heat 2
1	Thomas Maturano	Argentina	33.857 (1)	33.563 (1)	33.635 (1)	3	Q
2	Federico Capello	Argentina	34.471 (2)	34.237 (2)	33.782 (2)	6	Q
3	Franco Mendizabal	Ecuador	34.808 (3)	34.859 (3)	34.204 (3)	9	Q
4	Jeremy Marchena	Dominican Republic	35.779 (4)	35.478 (4)	36.545 (5)	13	Q
5	Edgar Rodarte	Mexico	35.890 (5)	35.902 (5)	35.845 (4)	14	
6	Javier Martínez	Paraguay	42.782 (6)	42.669 (6)	42.157 (6)	18	
Heat 3
1	Lucas Zimmermann	Brazil	1:07.981 (6)	34.008 (1)	33.763 (1)	8	Q
2	Ignacio Mangual	Puerto Rico	35.853 (1)	35.614 (4)	34.540 (3)	8	Q
3	Ethan Popovich	United States	52.710 (5)	34.429 (2)	34.091 (2)	9	Q
4	Raydex Bolaños	Venezuela	36.435 (2)	35.257 (3)	35.202 (4)	9	Q
5	Kingman Koochoy	Peru	37.016 (3)	36.141 (5)	36.184 (5)	13	
6	Boris Duque	Guatemala	37.733 (4)	37.398 (6)	37.632 (6)	16	

Semifinals – August 22

Rank	Name	Nation	Race 1	Race 2	Race 3	Total	Notes
Heat 1
1	Juan Velásquez	Colombia	32.964 (1)	34.245 (1)	32.866 (1)	3	Q
2	Federico Capello	Argentina	33.258 (2)	34.716 (2)	33.478 (2)	6	Q
3	Juan Lopez	Colombia	33.502 (3)	35.034 (3)	34.274 (4)	10	Q
4	Ethan Popovich	United States	33.859 (4)	36.220 (5)	33.822 (3)	12	Q
5	Franco Mendizabal	Ecuador	34.725 (5)	36.092 (4)	36.100 (6)	15	
6	Jeremy Marchena	Dominican Republic	36.582 (6)	38.096 (6)	35.695 (5)	17	
Heat 2
1	Thomas Maturano	Argentina	34.048 (1)	33.909 (1)	35.329 (1)	3	Q
2	Lucas Zimmermann	Brazil	34.643 (3)	34.361 (2)	35.730 (2)	7	Q
3	Evan Esposito	United States	34.248 (2)	34.630 (3)	36.317 (3)	8	Q
4	Raydex Bolaños	Venezuela	36.167 (5)	35.045 (4)	36.616 (5)	14	Q
5	Ignacio Mangual	Puerto Rico	35.525 (4)	35.299 (5)	36.771 (6)	15	
6	Ignacio Aguilera	Chile	36.707 (6)	36.090 (6)	36.467 (4)	16	

Final – August 22

Rank	Name	Nation	Time	Notes
1st place, gold medalist(s)	Federico Capello	Argentina	34.495	
2nd place, silver medalist(s)	Ethan Popovich	United States	34.846	
3rd place, bronze medalist(s)	Evan Esposito	United States	35.651	
4	Juan Velásquez	Colombia	35.670	
5	Lucas Zimmermann	Brazil	35.873	
6	Raydex Bolaños	Venezuela	36.020	
7	Juan Lopez	Colombia	1:00.814	
	Thomas Maturano	Argentina	DNF	

==== Women's race ====
Seeding run – August 21

Rank	Name	Nation	Time
1	Derin Merten	United States	36.652
2	Alexis Alden	United States	36.980
3	Manuela Martínez	Colombia	37.115
4	Sharid Fayad	Colombia	37.438
5	Agostina Ruarte	Argentina	38.075
6	Doménica Mora	Ecuador	38.127
7	Maria Alfaro	Ecuador	39.065
8	Alma Piñeiro	Argentina	39.274
9	Metztli Gonzalez	Mexico	40.597
10	Emilia Carrasco	Chile	41.089
11	Angelina Moreno	Venezuela	41.137
12	María Fernandez	Venezuela	41.354
13	Valentina Ramírez	Chile	41.728
14	Nicole Jimenez	Mexico	42.954
15	Mayra Monroy	Brazil	43.294
16	Alejandra Martinez	El Salvador	45.617
17	Alice Hahn	Paraguay	45.666
	Isabella Franco	Brazil	DNS

Quarterfinals – August 22

Rank	Name	Nation	Race 1	Race 2	Race 3	Total	Notes
Heat 1
1	Derin Merten	United States	37.216 (1)	36.741 (1)	36.356 (1)	3	Q
2	Doménica Mora	Ecuador	37.566 (2)	37.861 (3)	37.398 (2)	7	Q
3	Maria Alfaro	Ecuador	40.182 (3)	37.817 (2)	38.080 (3)	8	Q
4	María Fernandez	Venezuela	40.258 (4)	40.304 (4)	40.922 (4)	12	Q
5	Valentina Ramírez	Chile	41.478 (5)	40.592 (5)	41.731 (5)	15	
Heat 2
1	Alexis Alden	United States	36.817 (1)	37.149 (1)	36.695 (1)	3	Q
2	Agostina Ruarte	Argentina	38.225 (2)	38.291 (2)	37.260 (2)	6	Q
3	Alma Piñeiro	Argentina	39.487 (3)	39.273 (3)	40.092 (3)	9	Q
4	Angelina Moreno	Venezuela	41.817 (5)	41.054 (4)	41.262 (4)	13	Q
5	Nicole Jimenez	Mexico	41.799 (4)	42.990 (5)	43.328 (5)	14	
6	Alice Hahn	Paraguay	46.100 (6)	46.598 (6)	46.414 (6)	18	
Heat 3
1	Manuela Martínez	Colombia	38.627 (2)	37.689 (1)	36.680 (1)	4	Q
2	Sharid Fayad	Colombia	38.267 (1)	38.674 (2)	38.584 (2)	5	Q
3	Metztli Gonzalez	Mexico	41.506 (4)	39.151 (3)	40.209 (3)	10	Q
4	Emilia Carrasco	Chile	40.580 (3)	39.688 (4)	40.344 (4)	11	Q
5	Mayra Monroy	Brazil	43.315 (5)	42.982 (5)	44.325 (5)	15	
6	Alejandra Martinez	El Salvador	46.232 (6)	44.907 (6)	1:48.165 (6)	18	

Semifinals – August 22

Rank	Name	Nation	Race 1	Race 2	Race 3	Total	Notes
Heat 1
1	Sharid Fayad	Colombia	38.448 (1)	38.893 (1)	39.173 (3)	5	Q
2	Derin Merten	United States	38.622 (2)	40.073 (3)	37.320 (1)	6	Q
3	Agostina Ruarte	Argentina	39.049 (3)	39.278 (2)	38.603 (2)	7	Q
4	Alma Piñeiro	Argentina	39.327 (4)	40.438 (4)	39.911 (4)	12	Q
5	Metztli Gonzalez	Mexico	39.687 (5)	41.145 (5)	41.394 (5)	15	
6	Angelina Moreno	Venezuela	41.899 (6)	42.962 (6)	42.468 (6)	18	
Heat 2
1	Manuela Martínez	Colombia	37.310 (2)	37.904 (1)	36.857 (1)	4	Q
2	Alexis Alden	United States	37.276 (1)	38.382 (2)	36.919 (2)	5	Q
3	Doménica Mora	Ecuador	39.016 (3)	39.384 (3)	39.291 (4)	10	Q
4	Maria Alfaro	Ecuador	40.253 (4)	39.761 (4)	38.661 (3)	11	Q
5	Emilia Carrasco	Chile	40.720 (5)	41.302 (5)	40.211 (5)	15	
6	María Fernandez	Venezuela	DNF (6)	DNS (8)	DNS (8)	22	

Final – August 22

Rank	Name	Nation	Time	Notes
1st place, gold medalist(s)	Alexis Alden	United States	37.963	
2nd place, silver medalist(s)	Derin Merten	United States	38.501	
3rd place, bronze medalist(s)	Sharid Fayad	Colombia	38.619	
4	Doménica Mora	Ecuador	38.926	
5	Manuela Martínez	Colombia	39.079	
6	Agostina Ruarte	Argentina	40.184	
7	Alma Piñeiro	Argentina	40.201	
8	Maria Alfaro	Ecuador	40.881	

=== BMX freestyle ===
==== Men's ====
Qualification – August 10

Rank	Name	Nation	Run 1	Run 2	Score	Notes
1	Manuel Turone	Argentina	80.67	81.67	81.17	Q
2	Saúl Hernández	Colombia	83.00	79.00	81.00	Q
3	Davi Henrique Sodré	Brazil	74.67	68.33	71.50	Q
4	Derek Solano	Costa Rica	70.00	68.33	69.17	Q
5	Ismael Arroyo	Chile	64.00	62.67	63.34	Q
6	Gaspar Becerra	Chile	62.33	58.00	60.17	Q
7	Dennis Jiménez	Mexico	43.33	40.33	41.83	Q
8	Karl Marin	Venezuela	38.67	32.33	35.50	Q
9	Michael Warkentin	Paraguay	36.00	34.67	35.34	
10	Victor Martínez	Honduras	30.00	20.67	25.34	
11	Valentino Villalba	Argentina	23.33	27.33	25.33	
12	Anthony Castro	Venezuela	15.00	31.57	23.34	
13	Jim Pachecho	Peru	19.33	17.33	18.33	

Final – August 11

Rank	Name	Nation	Run 1	Run 2	Score	Notes
1st place, gold medalist(s)	Saúl Hernández	Colombia	18.67	92.67	92.67	
2nd place, silver medalist(s)	Manuel Turone	Argentina	83.67	91.00	91.00	
3rd place, bronze medalist(s)	Davi Henrique Sodré	Brazil	61.33	79.67	79.67	
4	Dennis Jiménez	Mexico	51.67	46.33	51.67	
5	Gaspar Becerra	Chile	49.33	47.67	49.33	
6	Karl Marin	Venezuela	32.67	33.67	33.67	
7	Ismael Arroyo	Chile	25.00	23.67	25.00	
8	Derek Solano	Costa Rica	6.33	21.33	21.33	

==== Women's ====
Qualification – August 10

Rank	Name	Nation	Run 1	Run 2	Score	Notes
1	Queen Saray Villegas	Colombia	84.00	81.00	82.50	Q
2	Lizsurley Villegas	Colombia	79.33	77.67	78.50	Q
3	Catalina Henríquez	Chile	66.00	57.33	61.67	Q
4	Sofía Baze	Mexico	48.00	43.00	45.50	Q
5	Valeria Segura	Mexico	37.67	35.33	36.50	Q
6	Antonella Pastene	Chile	29.00	30.67	27.00	Q
7	Luz Corpacci	Argentina	34.44	19.67	27.00	Q
8	Luna Navarro	Brazil	24.33	26.67	25.50	Q
9	Ayumi Ytomura	Peru	21.33	14.67	18.00	
10	María Rocha	Peru	20.67	5.00	12.84	

Final – August 11

Rank	Name	Nation	Run 1	Run 2	Score	Notes
1st place, gold medalist(s)	Queen Saray Villegas	Colombia	73.67	81.67	81.67	
2nd place, silver medalist(s)	Lizsurley Villegas	Colombia	70.00	76.00	76.00	
3rd place, bronze medalist(s)	Catalina Henríquez	Chile	72.67	71.67	72.67	
4	Sofía Baze	Mexico	51.67	47.00	51.67	
5	Valeria Segura	Mexico	20.00	35.67	35.67	
6	Antonella Pastene	Chile	11.33	33.00	33.00	
7	Luna Navarro	Brazil	22.33	21.00	22.33	
	Luz Corpacci	Argentina			DNS	
