= Taekwondo at the 2025 Junior Pan American Games =

Taekwondo at the 2025 Junior American Games
- Venue: Olympic Training Centre
- Start date: August 15, 2025
- End date: August 17, 2025
- No. of events: 12
- Competitors: 84

The taekwondo events at the 2025 Junior Pan American Games were held at the Olympic Training Centre, located in the Olympic Park in Luque, in the Greater Asuncion area. The events were contested between August 15 and 17, 2025.

Twelve events were contested, five for men, five for women, and two mixed. The winner of each event qualified for the 2027 Pan American Games in Lima, Peru.

== Qualification ==
A total of 84 athletes qualified for the events, 64 for the kyorugi events and 20 for the poomsae ones. Qualification was based on the results from different Panam Series.

== Medal summary ==
=== Medal table ===
* Host nation (Paraguay)

Rank	Nation	Gold	Silver	Bronze	Total
1	United States	3	2	1	6
2	Mexico	2	3	4	9
3	Brazil	2	1	2	5
4	Argentina	1	0	2	3
5	Cuba	1	0	1	2
6	Canada	1	0	0	1
6	Chile	1	0	0	1
6	Haiti	1	0	0	1
9	Colombia	0	3	2	5
10	Peru	0	1	3	4
11	Ecuador	0	1	1	2
11	Uruguay	0	1	1	2
13	Nicaragua	0	0	2	2
13	Paraguay*	0	0	2	2
15	Bolivia	0	0	1	1
15	Guatemala	0	0	1	1
15	Puerto Rico	0	0	1	1
Totals (17 entries)		12	12	24	48

=== Medalists ===
==== Kyorugi ====
Men

Event	Gold	Silver	Bronze
–58 kg	Ignacio Espínola; Argentina	Matheus Gilliard; Brazil	Carlos Cortés; Mexico
–58 kg	Ignacio Espínola; Argentina	Matheus Gilliard; Brazil	Ilay Rodríguez; Puerto Rico
–68 kg	Cristián Olivero; Chile	Maikol Rodriguez; United States	Matías López; Uruguay
–68 kg	Cristián Olivero; Chile	Maikol Rodriguez; United States	Ángel Sánchez; Colombia
–80 kg	Henrique Marques; Brazil	Maicol Solis; Colombia	Mateo Di Leo; Argentina
–80 kg	Henrique Marques; Brazil	Maicol Solis; Colombia	Juan Montalvo; Bolivia
+80 kg	Yoikel Goicochea; Cuba	César Silva; Colombia	Erick Vinicius Batista; Brazil
+80 kg	Yoikel Goicochea; Cuba	César Silva; Colombia	Víctor Ramírez; Mexico

Women

Event	Gold	Silver	Bronze
–49 kg	Andrea Zambrano; Mexico	María Sara Grippoli; Uruguay	Maya Mata; United States
–49 kg	Andrea Zambrano; Mexico	María Sara Grippoli; Uruguay	Nicolle Way; Guatemala
–57 kg	Zaira Salgado; Mexico	Montana Miller; United States	Ana Carolina Macedo; Brazil
–57 kg	Zaira Salgado; Mexico	Montana Miller; United States	Camila Arenas; Peru
–67 kg	Gabrielle Beaulieu; Canada	Mayte Caicedo; Ecuador	Anaisel León; Cuba
–67 kg	Gabrielle Beaulieu; Canada	Mayte Caicedo; Ecuador	Brenda Ruiz; Argentina
+67 kg	Ava Lee; Haiti	Paloma García; Mexico	Kiara Paz; Colombia
+67 kg	Ava Lee; Haiti	Paloma García; Mexico	Matvelin Espinoza; Ecuador

Mixed

Event	Gold	Silver	Bronze
Team	Brazil; Guilherme Morais; Henrique Marques; Camilly Gosch	Colombia; Danna Ramírez; Daniel Ramírez; César Silva	Paraguay; Luz Areco; Hilda Vera; Esteban Trébol; Mauro Melgarejo; Alejandro Añazco; Juan Daniel Gaona
Team	Brazil; Guilherme Morais; Henrique Marques; Camilly Gosch	Colombia; Danna Ramírez; Daniel Ramírez; César Silva	Mexico; Leonardo Gómez; Carlos Cortes; Víctor Ramírez; Paloma García; Zaira Salgado; Julia Ramírez

==== Poomsae ====
Event	Gold	Silver	Bronze
Men's individual	Sunghyun Eric Gun; United States	Obed Martínez; Mexico	Rubén Arce; Paraguay
Men's individual	Sunghyun Eric Gun; United States	Obed Martínez; Mexico	Mateo Argomedo; Peru
Women's individual	Kaitlyn Reclusado; United States	Brisa Alekc; Mexico	Sophia Berdugo; Nicaragua
Women's individual	Kaitlyn Reclusado; United States	Brisa Alekc; Mexico	Fabiana Varillas; Peru
Mixed pairs freestyle	United States; Sunghyun Eric Gun; Kaitlyn Reclusado	Peru; Mateo Argomedo; Fabiana Varillas	Mexico; Obed Martínez; Brisa Alekc
Mixed pairs freestyle	United States; Sunghyun Eric Gun; Kaitlyn Reclusado	Peru; Mateo Argomedo; Fabiana Varillas	Nicaragua; Sebastián Berdugo; Sophia Berdugo

== Results ==
=== Men's kyorugi ===
==== 58 kg ====
Date: August 15

Quarterfinals
Carlos Cortes (MEX)	W
Mauricio Ramírez (ECU)	DSQ
Matheus Gilliard (BRA)	2
Alejandro Añasco (PAR)	0
Áaron Contreras (CHI)	1
Ignacio Espinola (ARG)	2
Ilay Rodríguez (PUR)	2
Daniel Ramírez (COL)	1

Semifinals
Carlos Cortes (MEX)	1
Matheus Gilliard (BRA)	2
Ignacio Espinola (ARG)	2
Ilay Rodríguez (PUR)	0

Gold medal match
Matheus Gilliard (BRA)	1
Ignacio Espinola (ARG)	2

Bronze medal match
Ilay Rodríguez (PUR)	2
Alejandro Añasco (PAR)	0

Bronze medal match
Carlos Cortes (MEX)	2
Áaron Contreras (CHI)	0

==== 68 kg ====
Date: August 15

Quarterfinals
Maikol Rodriguez (USA)	2
Matías López (URU)	0
Ian Romero (PAN)	0
Juan Daniel Gaona (PER)	2
Cristián Olivero (CHI)	2
Ángel Sánchez (COL)	0
Leonardo Gómez (MEX)	0
Guilherme Morais (BRA)	2

Semifinals
Maikol Rodriguez (USA)	2
Juan Daniel Gaona (PER)	0
Cristián Olivero (CHI)	2
Guilherme Morais (BRA)	0

Gold medal match
Maikol Rodriguez (USA)	0
Cristián Olivero (CHI)	2

Bronze medal match
Guilherme Morais (BRA)	1
Matías López (URU)	2

Bronze medal match
Juan Daniel Gaona (PER)	0
Ángel Sánchez (COL)	2

==== 80 kg ====
Date: August 16

Quarterfinals
Henrique Marques (BRA)	1
Cameron Massay (USA)	0
Juan Montalvo (BOL)	2
Mauro Melgarejo (PAR)	0
Maicol Solis (COL)	2
Jann Tavarez (PUR)	0
Sebastián Castro (PER)	0
Mateo Di Leo (ARG)	2

Semifinals
Henrique Marques (BRA)	2
Juan Montalvo (BOL)	0
Maicol Solis (COL)	2
Mateo Di Leo (ARG)	1

Gold medal match
Henrique Marques (BRA)	2
Maicol Solis (COL)	0

Bronze medal match
Mateo Di Leo (ARG)	2
Cameron Massay (USA)	0

Bronze medal match
Juan Montalvo (BOL)	2
Jann Tavarez (PUR)	0

==== +80 kg ====
Date: August 16

Quarterfinals
César Silva (COL)	2
Pablo Feliz (DOM)	0
Francisco Lara (ESA)	1
Esteban Trébol (PAR)	2
Víctor Nieves (PUR)	0
Víctor Ramírez (MEX)	2
Yoikel Goicochea (CUB)	2
Erick Vinicius Batista (BRA)	1

Semifinals
César Silva (COL)	2
Esteban Trébol (PAR)	0
Víctor Ramírez (MEX)	0
Yoikel Goicochea (CUB)	2

Gold medal match
César Silva (COL)	0
Yoikel Goicochea (CUB)	2

Bronze medal match
Víctor Ramírez (MEX)	2
Pablo Feliz (DOM)	0

Bronze medal match
Esteban Trébol (PAR)	0
Erick Vinicius Batista (BRA)	2

=== Women's kyorugi ===
==== 49 kg ====
Date: August 15

Quarterfinals
Camilly Gosch (BRA)	1
María Sara Grippoli (URU)	2
Maude Ricard (CAN)	2
Luz Areco (PAR)	1
Andrea Zambrano (MEX)
Nicolle Way (GUA)	0
Danna Ramírez (COL)	0
Maya Mata (USA)	2

Semifinals
María Sara Grippoli (URU)	2
Maude Ricard (CAN)	0
Andrea Zambrano (MEX)	2
Maya Mata (USA)	1

Gold medal match
María Sara Grippoli (URU)	0
Andrea Zambrano (MEX)	2

Bronze medal match
Maya Mata (USA)	2
Camilly Gosch (BRA)	0

Bronze medal match
Maude Ricard (CAN)	1
Nicolle Way (GUA)	2

==== 57 kg ====
Date: August 15

Quarterfinals
Camila Arenas (PER)	2
Hilda Vera (PAR)	0
Montana Miller (USA)	2
Brenda Brooks (PAN)	0
Andrea Delgado (PUR)	0
Ana Carolina Macedo (BRA)	2

Semifinals
Zaira Salgado (MEX)	2
Camila Arenas (PER)	0
Montana Miller (USA)	2
Ana Carolina Macedo (BRA)	0

Gold medal match
Zaira Salgado (MEX)	2
Montana Miller (USA)	0

Bronze medal match
Ana Carolina Macedo (BRA)
BYE

Bronze medal match
Camila Arenas (PER)	2
Brenda Brooks (PAN)	0

==== 67 kg ====
Date: August 16

Quarterfinals
Mayte Caicedo (ECU)	2
Anaisel León (CUB)	0
Maria Eduarda Casagrande (BRA)	1
Brenda Ruiz (ARG)	2
Gabrielle Beaulieu (CAN)	2
Zulema Escalante (HON)	0
Daniela Daza (BOL)	0
Julia Ramírez (MEX)	2

Semifinals
Mayte Caicedo (ECU)	2
Brenda Ruiz (ARG)	0
Gabrielle Beaulieu (CAN)	1
Julia Ramírez (MEX)	0

Gold medal match
Mayte Caicedo (ECU)	1
Gabrielle Beaulieu (CAN)	2

Bronze medal match
Julia Ramírez (MEX)	1
Anaisel León (CUB)	2

Bronze medal match
Brenda Ruiz (ARG)	2
Zulema Escalante (HON)	0

==== +67 kg ====
Date: August 16

Quarterfinals
Ava Lee (HAI)	2
Valeria López (PUR)	0
Maelynn Fradl (ARU)	1
Matvelin Espinoza (ECU)	2
Elianet Crespo (CUB)	1
Kiara Paz (COL)	2
Samantha Pelayo (USA)	0
Paloma García (MEX)	2

Semifinals
Ava Lee (HAI)	2
Matvelin Espinoza (ECU)	0
Kiara Paz (COL)	1
Paloma García (MEX)	2

Gold medal match
Ava Lee (HAI)	2
Paloma García (MEX)	1

Bronze medal match
Kiara Paz (COL)	2
Valeria López (PUR)	0

Bronze medal match
Matvelin Espinoza (ECU)	2
Samantha Pelayo (USA)	0

=== Mixed team kyorugi ===
Date: August 17

Quarterfinals
Puerto Rico	0
Mexico	2

Semifinals
Brazil	2
Mexico	0
Paraguay	0
Colombia	2

Gold medal match
Brazil	2
Colombia	0

=== Poomsae ===
==== Men's individual ====
Date: August 17

Round of 16
Willian Rafael de Morais (BRA)	8.270
Carlos Jiménez (CRC)	8.110
Francisco Meléndez (GUA)	8.030
Christian Sangoquiza (ECU)	8.270

Quarterfinals
Sunghyun Eric Gun (USA)	8.790
Willian Rafael de Morais (BRA)	8.400
Sebastián Berdugo (NCA)	8.190
Rubén Arce (PAR)	8.191
Mateo Argomedo (PER)	8.460
Julián Ramírez (COL)	8.380
Christian Sangoquiza (ECU)	8.230
Obed Martínez (MEX)	8.630

Semifinals
Sunghyun Eric Gun (USA)	9.030
Rubén Arce (PAR)	8.180
Mateo Argomedo (PER)	8.630
Obed Martínez (MEX)	8.770

Final
Sunghyun Eric Gun (USA)	9.080
Obed Martínez (MEX)	8.740

==== Women's individual ====
Date: August 17

Round of 16
Larissa Thozeski (BRA)	8.510
Valeria Nuñez (CRC)	8.650
Celia Icuté (GUA)	8.630
Daniela García (ECU)	8.240

Quarterfinals
Kaitlyn Reclusado (USA)	9.020
Valeria Nuñez (CRC)	8.650
Sophia Berdugo (NCA)	8.560
Andrea Gómez (PAR)	8.360
Fabiana Varillas (PER)	W
Nicole Beltrán (COL)	WDR
Celia Icuté (GUA)	8.660
Brisa Alekc (MEX)	8.940

Semifinals
Kaitlyn Reclusado (USA)	9.020
Sophia Berdugo (NCA)	8.570
Fabiana Varillas (PER)	8.930
Brisa Alekc (MEX)	8.940

Final
Kaitlyn Reclusado (USA)	9.130
Brisa Alekc (MEX)	8.910

==== Mixed pairs freestyle ====
Date: August 17

Rank	Athletes	Nation	Total
1st place, gold medalist(s)	Kaitlyn Reclusado; Eric Sunghyun Gun	United States	8.800
2nd place, silver medalist(s)	Mateo Argomedo; Fabiana Varillas	Peru	8.480
3rd place, bronze medalist(s)	Obed Martínez; Brisa Alekc	Mexico	8.240
3rd place, bronze medalist(s)	Sophia Berdugo; Sebastián Berdugo	Nicaragua	8.200
5	Celia Icuté; Francisco Meléndez	Guatemala	8.060
6	Larissa Thozeski; Willian Rafael de Morais	Brazil	7.880
7	Carlos Jiménez; Valeria Nuñez	Costa Rica	7.160
8	Christian Sangoquiza; Daniela García	Ecuador	6.880
9	Ruben Arce; Andrea Gómez	Paraguay	6.700
	Julián Ramírez; Nicole Beltrán	Colombia	WDR
