= Trinidad and Tobago at the 2025 Junior Pan American Games =

- IOC code: TTO
- NOC: Trinidad and Tobago Olympic Committee

in Asunción, Paraguay
- Medals: Gold 1 Silver 0 Bronze 8 Total 9

Junior Pan American Games appearances (overview)
- 2021; 2025

Trinidad and Tobago is competing at the 2025 Junior Pan American Games in Asunción from August 9 to 23, 2025.

== Medals by sport ==
Sport	Gold	Silver	Bronze	Total
Athletics	1	0	1	2
Cycling track	0	0	5	5
Swimming	0	0	2	2
Totals (3 entries)	1	0	8	9

== Medalists ==
The following Trinbagonian competitors won medals at the games.

Medal	Name	Sport	Event	Date
Gold	Shaniqua Bascombe	Athletics	Women's 100m	August 19
Bronze	Zarek Wilson; Zachary Anthony; Johann-Mathew Matamoro	Swimming	Men's 4 × 100 metre freestyle relay	August 10
Bronze	Danell James; Jelani Nedd; Ryan D'Abreau	Cycling track	Men's team sprint	August 12
Bronze	Phoebe Sandy; Makaira Wallace; Kyra Williams	Cycling track	Women's team sprint	August 12
Bronze	Danell James	Cycling track	Men's Keirin	August 12
Bronze	Makaira Wallace	Cycling track	Women's Keirin	August 15
Bronze	Makaira Wallace	Cycling track	Women's Sprint	August 12
Bronze	Nikoli Blackman	Swimming	Men's 50-metre freestyle	August 13
Bronze	Janae De Gannes	Athletics	Women's Long Jump	August 19

== Field hockey ==
Trinidad and Tobago qualified a men's team of 18 athletes.

Key:

- P – Match decided by penalty-shootout.

Summary

Team	Event	Group stage				Semifinal	Final / BM / Pl.	
Team	Event	Opposition Result	Opposition Result	Opposition Result	Rank	Opposition Result	Opposition Result	Rank
Trinidad and Tobago men's	Men's tournament	Chile; L 1–4	Mexico; W 2–1	Canada; L 1–6	4	5th–8th place classification Brazil; L 4–5	Seventh and eighth place Paraguay; W 4–1	7

=== Men's tournament ===
Trinidad and Tobago qualified a men's team (of 18 athletes) by finishing second at the 2025 Men's Junior Pan American Challenge in Bridgetown, Barbados.

Pool A

Pos	Team	Pld	W	D	L	GF	GA	GD	Pts	Qualification
1	Canada	3	2	0	1	11	5	+6	6	Semi-finals
2	Chile	3	2	0	1	7	3	+4	6	Semi-finals
3	Mexico	3	1	0	2	5	8	−3	3	
4	Trinidad and Tobago	3	1	0	2	4	11	−7	3	

Source: FIH
Rules for classification: 1) points; 2) matches won; 3) goal difference; 4) goals for; 5) head-to-head result; 6) field goals for.

10 August 2025
11:30

Chile	4–1	Trinidad and Tobago
Hasson 9', 36'; Fosalba 48'; Vargas 56'	Report	Siu Butt 45'

Umpires:
Pambavasan Manikandan (CAN)
Brian Tyson (USA)

12 August 2025
09:30

Mexico	1–2	Trinidad and Tobago
Cuate 30'	Report	Wyatt 35'; Rowe 48'

Umpires:
Basilio Canale (ARG)
Ricardo Albertz (CHI)

14 August 2025
09:30

Canada	6–1	Trinidad and Tobago
Robinson 8', 19'; Ross 13'; Dhadda 20'; Chandi 43'; De Souza 58'	Report	Adamson 40'

Umpires:
Fabian Romero (PAR)
Adrian Cross (JAM)

Cross-overs

16 August 2025
09:30

Brazil	5–4	Trinidad and Tobago
Moreira 4', 35'; Xavier 7' da Silva 30'; Buzatto 36'	Report	Siu Butt 36'; Edwards 37'; Nieves 46', 51'

Umpires:
Ricardo Albertz (CHI)
Adrian Cross (JAM)

Seventh and eighth place

18 August 2025
09:30

Trinidad and Tobago	4–1	Paraguay
Whiteman 5'; Wyatt 14', 50'; Edwards 55'	Report	Villagra 53'

Umpires:
Claudio Martinez (URU)
Pambavasan Manikandan (CAN)

== See also ==
- Trinidad and Tobago at the Junior Pan American Games
