= Nicaragua at the 2025 Junior Pan American Games =

- IOC code: NIC
- NOC: Nicaraguan Olympic Committee

in Asunción, Paraguay
- Competitors: 17
- Flag bearers: Joysi Tinoco; Anderson Cano
- Medals: Gold 0 Silver 0 Bronze 2 Total 2

Junior Pan American Games appearances (overview)
- 2021; 2025

Nicaragua is competing at the 2025 Junior Pan American Games in Asunción, Paraguay from August 9 to 23, 2025.

The Nicaraguan team consists of 17 athletes.

== Medals by sport ==
Sport	Gold	Silver	Bronze	Total
Taekwondo	0	0	2	2
Totals (1 entries)	0	0	2	2

== Medalists ==
The following Nicaraguan competitors won medals at the games.

Medal	Name	Sport	Event	Date
Bronze	Sophia Berdugo	Taekwondo	Women's Individual Traditional Poomsae	August 17
Bronze	Sophia Berdugo; Sebastián Berdugo	Taekwondo	Mixed Poomsae Freestyle Pairs	August 17

== See also ==
- Nicaragua at the Junior Pan American Games
