= Suriname at the 2025 Junior Pan American Games =

- IOC code: SUR
- NOC: Suriname Olympic Committee

in Asunción, Paraguay
- Competitors: 7
- Medals: Gold 0 Silver 0 Bronze 0 Total 0

Junior Pan American Games appearances (overview)
- 2021; 2025

Suriname competed at the 2025 Junior Pan American Games in Asunción, Paraguay from August 9 to 23, 2025.

The Surinamese team consisted of 7 athletes, however, the country failed to win a medal.

== Competitors ==
The following is the list of number of competitors (per gender) participating at the games per sport/discipline.

Sport	Men	Women	Total
Athletics	1	1	2
Badminton	1	1	2
Cycling Track	1	0	1
Swimming	1	1	2
Total	4	3	7

== See also ==
- Suriname at the Junior Pan American Games
