= María Sara Grippoli =

Uruguayan taekwondo practitioner (born 2004 or 2005)

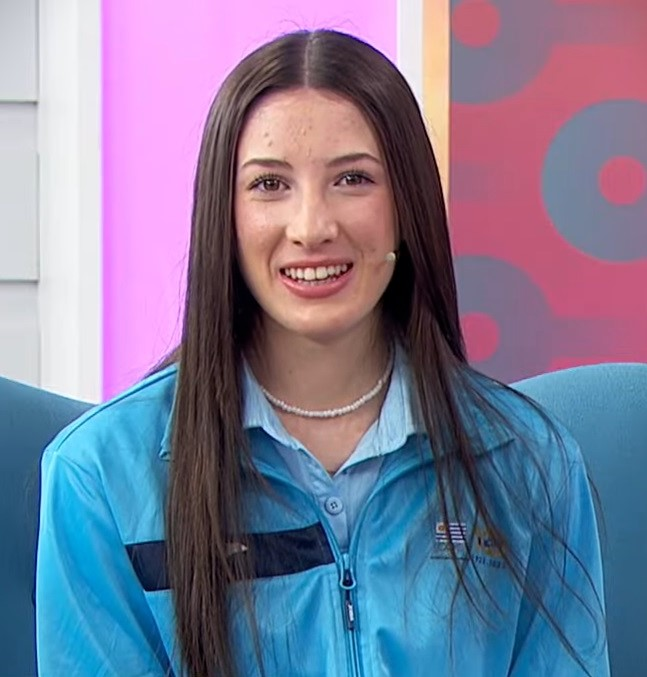
- Grippoli in 2024

Personal information
- Born: 28 December 2004 (age 21) Montevideo, Uruguay
- Education: Universidad de la Empresa

Sport
- Country: Uruguay
- Sport: Taekwondo
- Weight class: 49 kg
Medal record
Representing Uruguay
Women's taekwondo
Pan American Championships
Bronze medal – third place	2024 Rio de Janeiro	49 kg
Bronze medal – third place	2026 Rio de Janeiro	49 kg
Junior Pan American Games
Silver medal – second place	2025 Asunción	49 kg
South American Youth Games
Bronze medal – third place	2022 Rosario	49 kg

María Sara Grippoli Gagliardo (born 28 December 2004) is a Uruguayan taekwondo practitioner. She qualified for the 2024 Summer Olympics and was named her country's flag bearer. She is the first Olympic taekwondo practitioner from Uruguay.

== Biography ==
Grippoli learned taekwondo at the Lee Academy aged five, but did not begin fighting competitively until 2016. Her two sisters are taekwondo practitioners as well. By 2019, Grippoli had become a member of the national team. She competed at the 2022 South American Youth Games in the 49 kg category and won the bronze medal.

Grippoli began competing in senior competitions later that year, participating at that year's Pan American Taekwondo Championships. By June 2023, she was ranked 48th globally in her category. That month, she competed at the World Taekwondo Championships and placed 17th in her division. She then won bronze at the Argentina Open in September 2023 and competed at the Pan American Games, ultimately placing fifth after losing the bronze medal match.

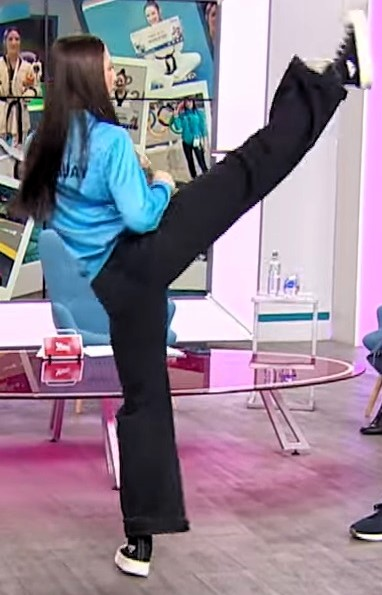
Grippoli demonstrates a kick on Desayunos informales in 2024

Grippoli is coached by Uruguayan former taekwondo practitioner Mayko Votta, who competed at the 2007 Pan American Games. In 2024, she won bronze medals at the Pan American Championships and at the Rio Open tournament. She also won gold at the 2024 Pan American Taekwondo Olympic Qualification Tournament, thus qualifying her for the 2024 Summer Olympics. She became the first Olympic taekwondo practitioner in Uruguayan history and was chosen her country's flag bearer at the opening ceremony.

Grippoli studies engineering at the Universidad de la Empresa on a scholarship.
