= Kaitlyn Reclusado =

American athlete (born 2004)

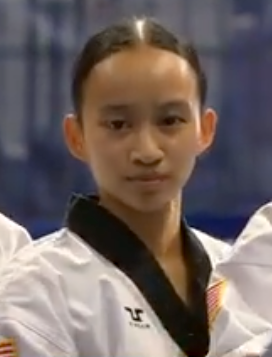
- At the 2025 Summer World University Games

Personal information
- Full name: Kaitlyn Marie Reclusado
- Born: December 1, 2004 (age 21) Daly City, California, U.S.
- Height: 5 ft 0 in (152 cm)

Sport
- Country: USA
- Sport: Taekwondo
- Event(s): Recognized Poomsae, Freestyle Poomsae
- Club: Yong in Martial Arts, Dowongyuleui USA Poomsae Team

Achievements and titles
- World finals: 1st place, gold medalist(s)
- Regional finals: 1st place, gold medalist(s)
- Highest world ranking: 2 (2023–2026)
Medal record
Women's Taekwondo
Representing United States
Senior
World Championships
Bronze medal – third place	2022 Goyang	Poomsae, f under 30
World University Games
Gold medal – first place	2025 Rhine-Ruhr	Poomsae, Pair
Bronze medal – third place	2025 Rhine-Ruhr	Poomsae, Individual
Bronze medal – third place	2025 Rhine-Ruhr	Poomsae, Team
Pan American Games
Gold medal – first place	2023 Santiago	Poomsae
Pan American Championships
Gold medal – first place	2022 online	Poomsae, team f
Gold medal – first place	2024 Rio de Janeiro	Poomsae, f under 30
Gold medal – first place	2024 Rio de Janeiro	Poomsae, team f
Gold medal – first place	2026 Rio de Janeiro	Poomsae, f under 30
Bronze medal – third place	2022 Punta Cana	Poomsae, f under 30
WT President's Cup
Gold medal – first place	2022 Jacksonville	Poomsae, f under 30
Gold medal – first place	2022 Jacksonville	Poomsae, team f
Bronze medal – third place	2024 Heredia	Poomsae, f under 30
Bronze medal – third place	2024 Heredia	Freestyle, f over 17
Bronze medal – third place	2026 London	Poomsae, f under 30
U.S. National Championships
Gold medal – first place	2021 San Antonio	Poomsae, f under 30
Gold medal – first place	2022 Salt Lake City	Poomsae, f under 30
Gold medal – first place	2022 Salt Lake City	Poomsae, team f
Gold medal – first place	2023 Jacksonville	Poomsae, team f
Gold medal – first place	2025 Ontario	Poomsae, pair
Gold medal – first place	2026 Charlotte	Poomsae, f under 30
Silver medal – second place	2023 Jacksonville	Poomsae, pair
Silver medal – second place	2024 Fort Worth	Poomsae, f under 30
Silver medal – second place	2024 Fort Worth	Freestyle, pair
Bronze medal – third place	2021 San Antonio	Poomsae, pairs
Bronze medal – third place	2021 San Antonio	Poomsae, team f
Bronze medal – third place	2022 Salt Lake City	Poomsae, pair
Bronze medal – third place	2023 Jacksonville	Poomsae, f under 30
Bronze medal – third place	2024 Fort Worth	Poomsae, team f
Junior
World Championships
Gold medal – first place	2020 Online	Poomsae, f under 17
Junior Pan American Games
Gold medal – first place	2025 Asunción	Poomsae, f under 22
Gold medal – first place	2025 Asunción	Mixed Poomsae, pair
Pan American Championships
Gold medal – first place	2020 online	Poomsae, f under 17

Kaitlyn Marie Reclusado (born December 1, 2004) is an American taekwondo athlete and world bronze medalist in traditional Poomsae.

== Career ==
Kaitlyn Reclusado started competing internationally in 2020 and won her first major medal at the World Poomsae Championships in the same year, when she became World Junior Champion in traditional poomsae. The single-elimination tournament was held online due to the COVID-19 pandemic. She also won first place in the junior's individual poomsae competition at the 2020 Pan American Championships, which were held online as well.

At the 2022 World Championships in Goyang, she beat her teammate Karyn Real in the quarter finale, lost to Marjan Salahshouri in the semi-finale and thus claimed a bronze medal at the women's Recognized Poomsae senior competition (ages 18 to 30). She also competed in the women's team competition (each team consisting of three women), where her team placed fifth.

Reclusado won a bronze and a gold medal at the 2022 Pan American Championships and won two more gold medals at the same competition in 2024. In 2023, she claimed the USA's first gold medal at the women's traditional Poomsae competition at the Pan American Games in Santiago.

== Personal life ==
Reclusado is a student at Menlo College and an instructor at her Taekwondo club.
