= Taekwondo at the 2023 Pan American Games – Women's poomsae individual =

Women's poomsae individual at the 2023 Pan American Games
- Venue: Contact Sports Center
- Start date: October 21, 2023
- End date: October 21, 2023
- Competitors: 10 from 10 nations

Medalists
Gold medal	Kaitlyn Reclusado	United States
Silver medal	Maria Higueros	Independent Athletes Team
Bronze medal	Seo Lee Kim	Mexico
Bronze medal	Arelis Medina	Puerto Rico

The women's poomsae individual competition of the taekwondo events at the 2023 Pan American Games in Santiago, Chile, was held on October 21 at the Contact Sports Center. A total of 10 athletes from 10 NOC's competed.

== Qualification ==
A total of 10 athletes qualified to compete in the Women's Poomsae individual event. The host nation, Chile, automatically qualified automatically and the quotas spots will be awarded at the qualification tournament held in Rio de Janeiro in March 2023. The final quota spots were awarded as wildcards.

== Results ==
=== Bracket ===
Round of 16
Tania Delgado (CUB)	7.200
Katlen Jervez (ECU)	7.380
Ingrid Darce (NCA)	1.0
Valerie Ho (CAN)	WDR*

Quarterfinals
Kaitlyn Reclusado (USA)	7.530
Katlen Jervez (ECU)	7.28
Seo Lee Kim (MEX)	7.490
Constanza Moya (CHI)	7.210
Arelis Medina (PUR)	7.490
Gabriela Castillo (PER)	7.230
Ingrid Darce (NCA)	7.120
Maria Higueros (EAI)	7.540

Semifinals
Kaitlyn Reclusado (USA)	7.660
Seo Lee Kim (MEX)	7.660
Arelis Medina (PUR)	7.390
Maria Higueros (EAI)	7.590

Final
Kaitlyn Reclusado (USA)	7.830
Maria Higueros (EAI)	7.350

- Valerie Ho of Canada withdrew and did not compete.
