= Haiti at the 2025 Junior Pan American Games =

- IOC code: HAI
- NOC: Haitian Olympic Committee

in Asunción, Paraguay
- Competitors: 7
- Medals: Gold 1 Silver 0 Bronze 0 Total 1

Junior Pan American Games appearances (overview)
- 2021; 2025

Haiti is competing at the 2025 Junior Pan American Games in Asunción from August 9 to 23, 2025.

The Haitian team consists of 7 athletes.

This was the first edition of any Pan American games in which Haiti won a gold medal with Ava Soon Lee in taekwondo.

== Medals by sport ==
| Sport | Gold | Silver | Bronze | Total |
|---|---|---|---|---|
| Taekwondo | 1 | 0 | 0 | 1 |
| Totals (1 entries) | 1 | 0 | 0 | 1 |

== Medalists ==
The following Haitian competitors won medals at the games.

| Medal | Name | Sport | Event | Date |
|---|---|---|---|---|
| Gold | Ava Soon Lee | Taekwondo | Women's Kyorugi +67kg | August 16 |

== See also ==
- Haiti at the Junior Pan American Games
