= San Juan del Paraná =

- District
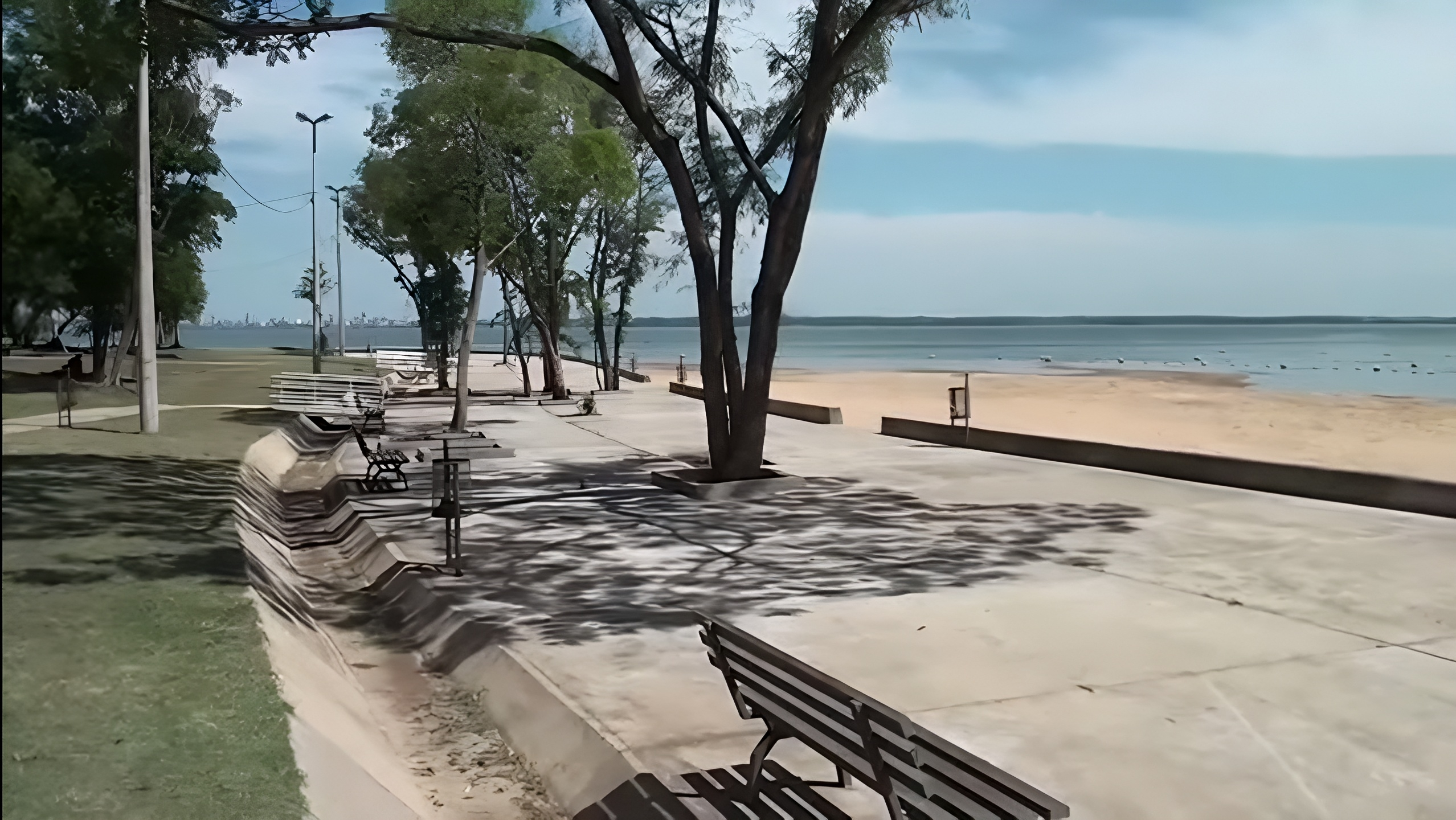
- San Juan del Paraná coastline, Paraguay

- Location within Paraguay
- Coordinates: 27.301°S 55.962°W
- Country: Paraguay
- Department: Itapúa
- Founded: 1789
- Founder: Joaquín de Alós y Brú

Government
  - Intendente Municipal: Aldo Numan Lepretti Báez

Area
  - Total: 250 km^{2} (97 sq mi)

Population (2008)
  - Total: 7,447
  - Density: 29/km^{2} (75/sq mi)
- Time zone: -4 Gmt
- Postal code: 6980
- Area code: (595) (742)

San Juan del Paraná is one of the 30 districts of the Itapúa Department, Paraguay.

It is located at the Argentina–Paraguay border, to the west of the city of Encarnación, the capital of the department, and was founded by Joaquín de Alós y Brú in 1789.

Its inhabitants work at low-scale agriculture and to subsistence cattle for subsistence.

== Geography ==
=== Area ===
It has an area of 25 square kilometres with a total population of 7,447 and a population density of 29.796 inhabitants per square kilometre.

=== Climate ===
This is the coldest zone in the country due to its position in the southernmost border, the absence of elevations that stop the southern wind and the high rate of humidity. Its average temperature nearly reaches 21 °C and the minimum temperatures could reach −4 °C in the riparian zones. Only in some exceptional cases the temperatures reach a maximum of 39 °C. The rain average is 1,700 millimetres annually, October being the rainiest month.

=== Limits ===
- North: The Carmen del Paraná district and the city of Encarnación.
- South: After crossing the Paraná River and the Middle Isle, is the Argentina.
- West: The Carmen del Paraná district.
- East: The city of Encarnación.

=== Hydrography ===
Through this district flows the Paraná River and the Caraguatá Spring.

== Demography ==
The main social-demographic indicators in the district are:

- Population under 15 years old: 40.8%
- Average of kids per woman: 2.9 kids
- Percentage of Illiterates:8.0%
- 23.6% of the occupied population dedicates to the primary sector, 27.6% to the secondary sector and 47.1% to the tertiary sector.
- Percentage of the population occupied in agricultural activities: 22.8%
- Percentage of houses with electricity service: 94.7%
- Percentage of houses with water service: 33.8%

Population with unsatisfied basic needs in:

- Education: 7.9%.
- Sanitary infrastructure: 21.1%.
- Housing quality: 31.2%.
- Subsistence capacity: 20.1%.

== Economy ==
The inhabitants of this district are dedicated to the cultivation of wheat, soy and other subsistence products. In the cattle activities, they stock-breed cows and sheep. Also have many industries.

== Roads and communication ==
The most important road is Route 1 "Mariscal Francisco Solano López", that connects it with the capital of the department, with Asunción and other locations of the department and the country. The other internal roads are gravel roads making easier the communication with other districts.

Has the telephonic services from Copaco and mobile telephony, besides various communication media and the journals from the capital of the country.

== How to get there ==
Following the Route 1 "Mariscal Francisco Solano López" from Asunción until getting to the 365th kilometer, then taking an unpaved branch of this road.

== Transportation ==
The roads are good and allow a fluid transit of people and cargo.

Modern transport busses takes the passengers to Asunción, the capital of the department and other locations of the region.

== Population ==
According to the data provided by the General Office of Statistics, Polls and Census, the total population of the San Juan del Paraná district is 7,447, being 3,921 males and 3,526 females.71.99% of the population is settled in the rural zone.

== Tourism ==
The city offers a commercial zone where could be found almost everything that a tourist looks for. This is one of the touristic reference points of Paraguay.

The district features beaches suitable for water sports and designated areas for recreational fishing.

Along the Paraná River and the Caraguatá Stream are beautiful beaches special as places for relaxation and touristic attraction.

== Gallery ==
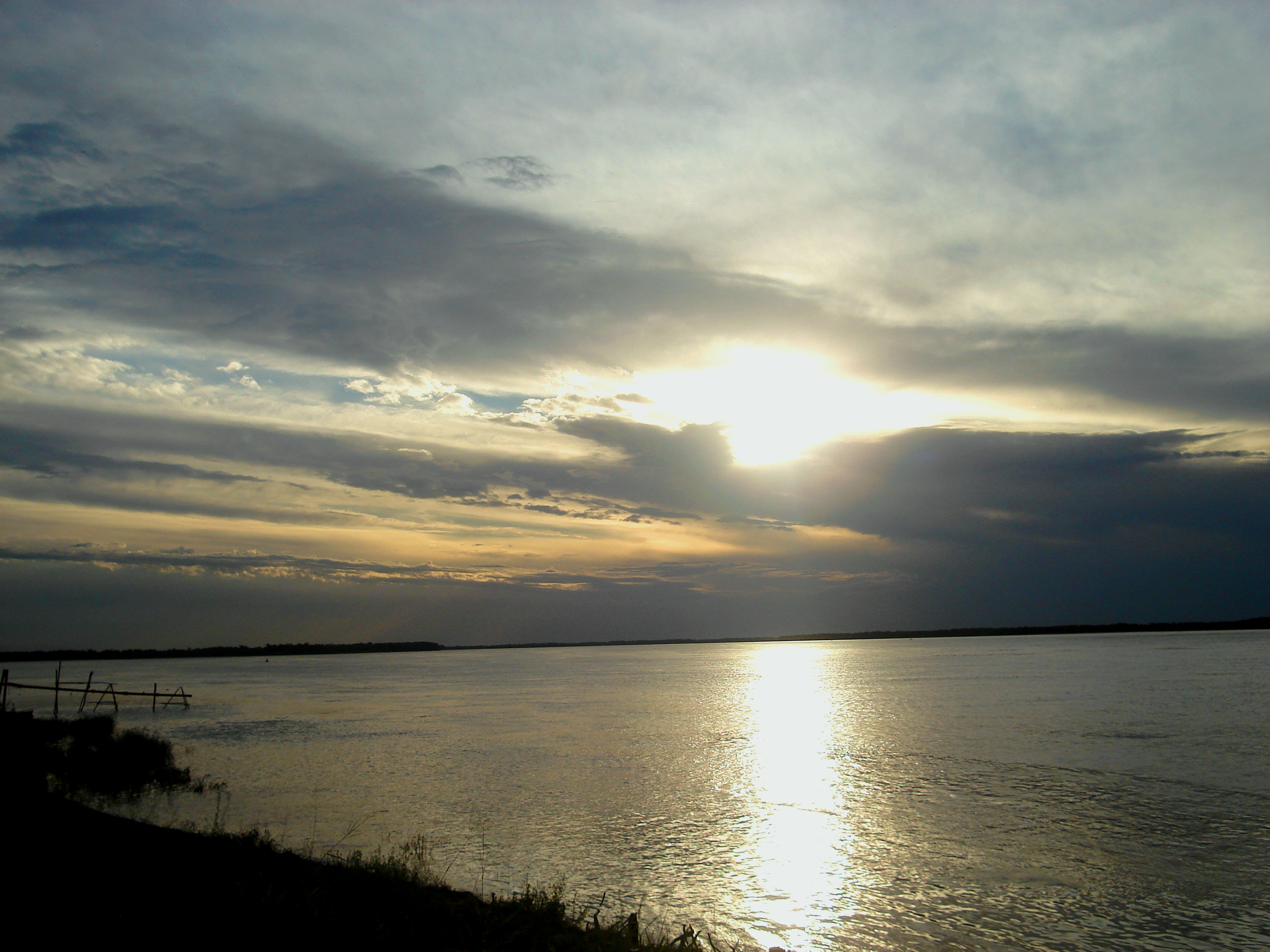
A sunset over the Paraná river, in San Juan del Paraná, Paraguay

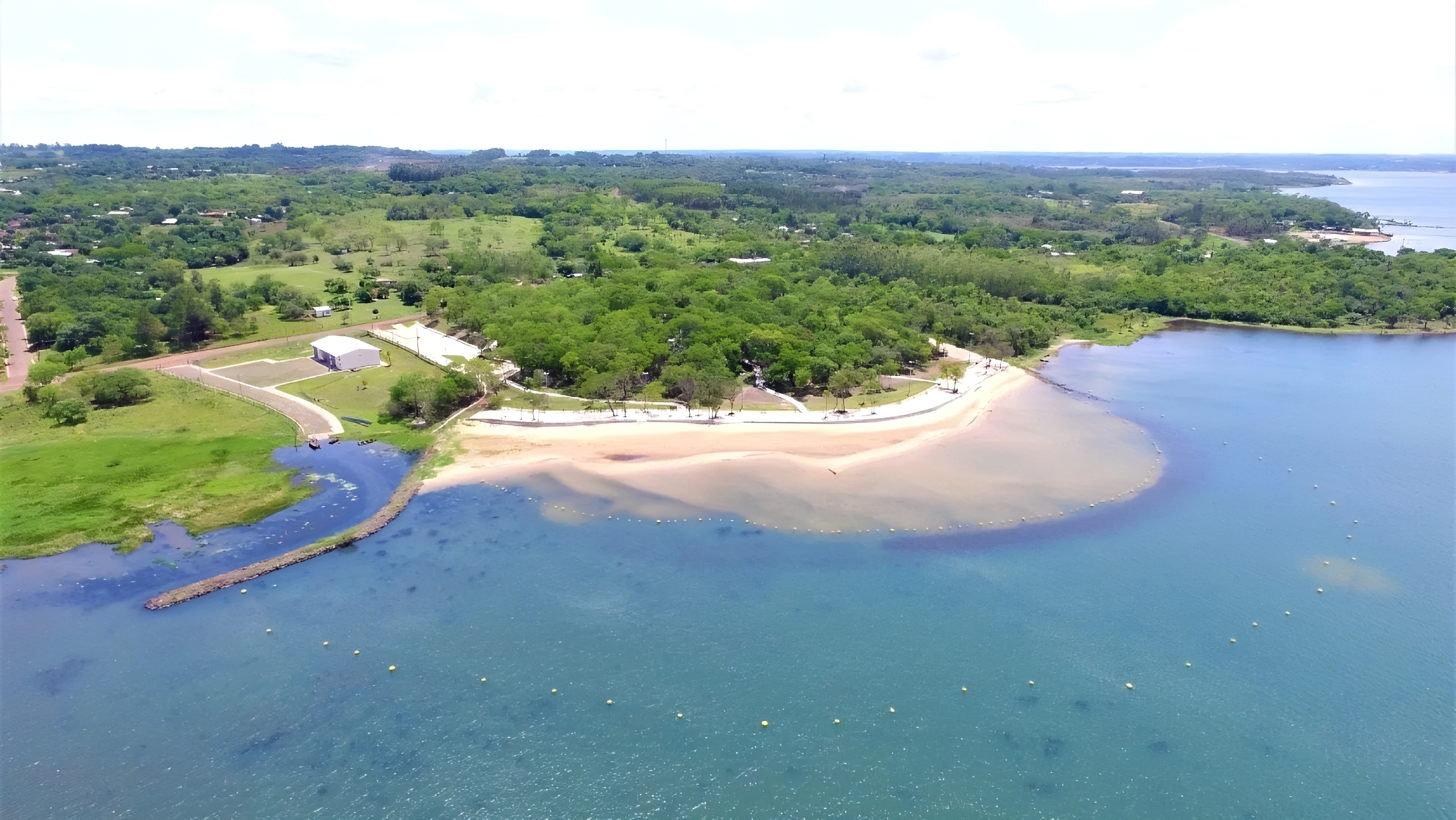
San Juan del Paraná, Paraguay
