= Golf at the Pacific Games =

Golf has been contested at the Pacific Games since 1969 when the sport was included as one of fifteen sports at the Third South Pacific Games held in Port Moresby, Papua New Guinea. It is a core sport on the Pacific Games program.

Men's and women's tournaments are contested by teams of four golfers per country, and medals are awarded for individual and team winners. Golf has also been included in many of the Pacific Mini Games, starting with the second edition held at Rarotonga in 1985.

== Pacific Games ==
=== All-time medal table ===
Rank	Nation	Gold	Silver	Bronze	Total
Totals (0 entries)		0	0	0	0

=== Medal summary ===
Flag icons indicate the nationality of the gold medal winner of an event, where this information is known; otherwise an (X) is used. A dash (–) indicates an event that was not contested.

Games	Year	Host city	Men's		Women's		Refs
Games	Year	Host city	Individual	Team	Individual	Team	Refs
III	1969	Port Moresby	(Papua New Guinea); John Wilkinson	Papua New Guinea	(Papua New Guinea); Jocelyn Munden	Papua New Guinea	
IV	1971	Papeete	(Papua New Guinea); John Wilkinson	Papua New Guinea	(Papua New Guinea); Jocelyn Munden	Papua New Guinea	
V	1975	Tumon	(Papua New Guinea); John Keating	Papua New Guinea	(Papua New Guinea); Ismay Trevena	Papua New Guinea	
VI	1979	Suva	(Papua New Guinea); Kundi Umba	Papua New Guinea	(American Samoa); Kim Young	American Samoa	
VII	1983	Apia	(Samoa); La'auli Tui	Western Samoa	(Guam); Lisa Stone	American Samoa	
VIII	1987	Nouméa	(Fiji); Vilikesa Kalou	Fiji	(American Samoa); Tupito Walker	American Samoa	
IX	1991	Port Moresby	(Papua New Guinea); August Peni	Papua New Guinea	(Papua New Guinea); Darrie Nightingale	Papua New Guinea	(Note: PNG won gold in all four golf events in 1991.)
X	1995	Papeete	(Fiji); Mukesh Chand	Fiji	(French Polynesia); Cristelle Cuzon	(French Polynesia); Tahiti	
XI	1999	Santa Rita	(Fiji); Dewan Gopal	New Caledonia	(Guam); Teresita Blair	Papua New Guinea	
XII	2003	Suva	(New Caledonia); Loic Truet	New Caledonia	(New Caledonia); Gaelle Truet	New Caledonia	
XIII	2007	Apia	(French Polynesia); Vaita Guilaume	Samoa	(American Samoa); Christine Drabble	New Caledonia	
XIV	2011	Nouméa	(New Caledonia); Adrian Peres	New Caledonia	(New Caledonia); Charlotte Navarro	New Caledonia	
XV	2015	Port Moresby	(Papua New Guinea); Soti Dinki	Papua New Guinea	(Papua New Guinea); Kristine Seko	Papua New Guinea	
XVI	2019	Apia	(New Caledonia); Dylan Benoit	New Caledonia	(New Caledonia); Emillie Ricaud	New Caledonia	
XVII	2023	Honiara	(New Caledonia); Guillaume Castagne	New Caledonia	(Tonga); Alexis Vakasiuola	New Caledonia	
XVIII	2027	Pirae					

== Pacific Mini Games ==
=== Medal summary ===
Games	Year	Host city	Men's		Women's		Refs
Games	Year	Host city	Individual	Team	Individual	Team	Refs
I		Not contested					
II	1985	Rarotonga	X	X	X	X	
III	1989	Nuku'alofa	(Samoa); Atapana Sanerive	Fiji	(French Polynesia); Itari Poetai	(French Polynesia); Tahiti	
IV	1993	Port Vila	X	X	X	X	
V	1997	Pago Pago	X	X	X	X	
VI	2001	Kingston	X	X	X	X	
VII		Not contested					
VIII	2009	Rarotonga	(Cook Islands); Kirk Tuaiti	Cook Islands	(Cook Islands); Elmay Viking	Cook Islands	(Note: Host country Cook Islands won all four gold medals in 2009.)
IX		Not contested					
X	2017	Port Vila	(New Caledonia); Guillaume Castagne	New Caledonia	(New Caledonia); Emillie Ricaud	New Caledonia	(Note: New Caledonia swept all four gold medals in 2017.)
XI	2022	Saipan					
XII	2025	Koror					

== See also ==
- Golf at the Summer Olympics
