= 2027 Pacific Games =

18th edition of the Pacific Games

XVIII Pacific Games
- Host city: Pirae, Tahiti
- Country: French Polynesia
- Motto: Welcoming everyone again
- Nations: 24 (expected)
- Athletes: ~4500 (expected)
- Events: 356 in 24 sports
- Opening: 24 July 2027
- Closing: 7 August 2027
- Main venue: Stade Pater
- Website: Official Website

The 2027 Pacific Games (French: 2027 Jeux du Pacifique; Tahitian: 2027 Ha‘utira‘a no Pātifita), officially known as the XVIII Pacific Games, and commonly known as Tahiti 2027 or Pirae 2027 (Tahitian: Pīraʻe 2027) is an upcoming continental multi-sport event for Pacific Island countries and territories that is scheduled to take place in Pirae, Tahiti, French Polynesia from 24 July to 7 August 2027.

It will be the third Pacific Games to be held in Tahiti after the 1971 South Pacific Games and 1995 South Pacific Games in Papeete.

== Host selection ==
Six countries and territories expressed interest in bidding for the games. American Samoa, Fiji, Guam, Tahiti, Tonga, and Vanuatu were among them. When the competition was known as the South Pacific Games, Fiji, Guam, and Tahiti hosted it in the past. Tonga, who were the initial winning bidders for the 2019 Games but later withdrew as host, also indicated their interest in hosting the games. As a result of their unsuccessful bids for the 2011 and 2015 Pacific Games, American Samoa and Vanuatu also expressed interest.

Fiji withdrew its bid earlier in 2021 owing to the effects of the COVID-19 pandemic and chose to concentrate on the 2031 Pacific Games instead. The Pacific Games Council narrowed down the remaining candidate nations and territories, eliminating American Samoa, Guam, and Tonga from consideration as hosts in favor of Tahiti and Vanuatu. On 25 June, both Tahiti and Vanuatu presented their official bids for the Games hosting rights.

The 22 PGC members that participated in the teleconferenced PGC General Assembly on 6 November 2021, voted in favor of Tahiti's candidacy.

2027 Pacific Games bidding summary
City	PGA name	Bid stage	Decision
Pirae	Tahiti	Final	Yes
Port Vila	Vanuatu	Final	No
Pago Pago	American Samoa	First	No
Hagatna	Guam	First	No
Nuku'alofa	Tonga	First	No
~~Suva~~	~~Fiji~~	Withdrew	

== Development and preparations ==
=== Venues ===
Venues will be located in 12 municipalities across three islands of Tahiti, Mo'orea and Rai'atea which are part of the Windward Islands. Pirae, the official host city, will host the opening and closing ceremonies at the Pater Stadium. Listed are the 25 confirmed venues for the Games.

==== Tahiti ====
Competition venues
City	Venue	Sport(s)	Capacity
Papeete	Salle Maco Nena	Boxing	
Papeete	Terrain du Parc Paofa'i	Beach volleyball, beach wrestling	1,000
Papeete	Place To'ata	3x3 basketball	
Papeete	Bassins de Mama'o	Swimming	
Papeete	Stand de tir Tere Garnier	Shooting - pistol	
Pirae	Stade Pater	Football	15,000
Pirae	Stade de Squash Pater	Squash	
Pirae	Parc Aorai Tini Hau	Va'a, kayaking	
Pirae	Complexe sportif Fautau'a	Basketball, rugby sevens, tennis	+1,500
Pirae	Complexe sportif AS JT	Basketball	
Pirae	Complexe sportif AS Dragon	Volleyball	
Faʻaʻā	Salle Omnisport du Collège Henri Hiro	Badminton, table tennis	400
Arue	Complexe sportif Boris Lèontieff	Judo	600
Arue	Yacht Club de Tahiti	Sailing	
Mahina	Complexe sportif AS Venus	Football, taekwondo, wrestling	2,400+
Hitia'a O Te Ra	Complexe sportif de Hitia'a	Athletics	10,000
Punaauia	Complexe sportif AS Phenix	Tennis	
Punaauia	Stade de la Punaru'u	Football	
Punaauia	Parc Vairai	Cycling	
Papara	Golf International de Tahiti	Golf, archery	
Papara	Center technique de Surf Popoti	Surfing	
Paea	Stade Manu Ura	Football	1,200+
Teva I Uta	Salle Nuutafaratea	Weightlifting, powerlifting	

==== Mo'orea ====
Competition venues
City	Venue	Sport(s)	Capacity
Moorea-Maiao	Plage de Ta'ahiamanu	Triathlon, open-water swimming, road cycling	

==== Raʻiātea ====
Competition venues
City	Venue	Sport(s)	Capacity
Taputapuatea
Taputapuatea	Stand de tir de Faaroa	Shooting - DTL	

== The Games ==
=== Sports ===
The 2027 Pacific Games are projected to feature competitions in at least 24 sports, including 17 "core" sports that have been part of the program since 2023. In its 2021 bid, the Tahiti 2027 Organizing Committee (OC) proposed nine optional sports for inclusion: badminton, cycling, handball, netball, powerlifting, shooting, squash, surfing, and wrestling. In November 2023, the Pacific Games Council (PGC) approved seven of these sports, omitting handball and netball in line with its policy of introducing Games-specific disciplines to boost local engagement and development. At the PGC annual general meeting in July 2025, it was confirmed that only two para-sports, para-athletics and para-table tennis, would be included in the program. In 2026, para-va'a became the third para-sport to be included on the program after it was approved by the PGC.

In February 2026, a total of 43 qualification systems for the 2028 Summer Olympics were published by the International Olympic Committee, and the qualification systems for sports that offer direct quotas from the 2027 Pacific Games include archery, athletics, shooting, swimming, taekwondo and weightlifting. Additional sports such as sailing and squash may be included if their respective regional sport's governing body's instead offer Olympic qualification though these Games.

- Archery (10)
- Athletics (61)
- Badminton (6)
- Basketball
  - Basketball (2)
  - 3x3 basketball (2)
- Boxing (25)
- Cycling
  - Mountain biking (5)
  - Road cycling (5)
- Football (2)
- Golf (4)
- Judo (17)
- Outrigger canoeing
  - Va'a (12)
  - Kayak (8)
- Powerlifting (16)
- Rugby sevens (2)
- Sailing (6)
- Shooting (9)
- Squash (7)
- Surfing (3)
- Swimming (45)
- Table tennis (13)
- Taekwondo (18)
- Tennis (7)
- Triathlon (6)
- Volleyball
  - Volleyball (2)
  - Beach volleyball (2)
- Weightlifting (48)
- Wrestling
  - Freestyle (20)
  - Greco-Roman (10)
  - Beach (8)

== Participating nations ==
All 24 countries and territories (22 member federations and 2 associate members of the PGC) are expected to send delegations. As of 28 October 2026, the following eight Nations are qualified:

- American Samoa (12)
- Federated States of Micronesia (24)
- Fiji (24)
- Guam (12)
- Papua New Guinea (70)
- Samoa (24)
- Tahiti (120)^{[a]} (host)
- Tonga (12)

Note

1. The number in parentheses indicates how many athletes confirmed.
2. ^[a] As host, Tahiti are guaranteed slots in all sports, hence, as of 3 April 2026 their total is the sum of maximum number of entries allowable for all team sports only.

== Calendar ==
The competition schedule was released by the Games Organizing Committee on 24 March 2026.

Daily medal events for all sports are yet to be confirmed.

All dates are French Polynesia Time (GMT-10)

OC	Opening ceremony	●	Event competitions	●	Contingency day	1	Gold medal events	CC	Closing ceremony

July/August 2027		July								August							Events
July/August 2027		24 Sat	25 Sun	26 Mon	27 Tue	28 Wed	29 Thu	30 Fri	31 Sat	1 Sun	2 Mon	3 Tue	4 Wed	5 Thu	6 Fri	7 Sat	Events
Ceremonies			OC													CC	
Archery					●	●											
Athletics																	
Badminton		●		●	●	●		●									
Basketball	Basketball	●		●	●	●	●	●	2								2
Basketball	3×3 Basketball													●	●	2	2
Boxing																	
Cycling	Mountain biking																
Cycling	Road cycling																
Football				●	●	●	●	●	●		●	●	●	2			2
Golf												●	●	●	4		4
Judo																	
Outrigger canoeing																	
Powerlifting																	
Rugby sevens												●	●	2			2
Sailing				●	●	●	●	●	●		●	●	●	●	●		
Shooting																	
Squash		●		●	●		●	●	●			●	●	●	●		
Surfing											●	●		●	●	●	
Swimming																	
Table tennis											●	●		●	●		
Taekwondo																	
Tennis		●		●	●	●	●	●	●	●	●	●	●	●	●		
Triathlon																	
Volleyball	Beach volleyball			●	●	●	●	●	2								2
Volleyball	Volleyball										●	●	●	●	●	2	2
Weightlifting																	
Wrestling	Wrestling																
Wrestling	Beach wrestling																
Total events																	
Cumulative total																	
July/August		Sat 24	Sun 25	Mon 26	Tue 27	Wed 28	Thu 29	Fri 30	Sat 31	Sun 1	Mon 2	Tue 3	Wed 4	Thu 5	Fri 6	Sat 7	Events

== See also ==
- Pacific Games held in French Polynesia
  - 1971 South Pacific Games – Papeete, Tahiti
  - 1995 South Pacific Games – Papeete, Tahiti
- Olympic Games events held in French Polynesia
  - Surfing at the 2024 Summer Olympics – Teahupo'o, Tahiti
