= Volleyball at the Pacific Games =

Volleyball at the Pacific Games (previously known as the South Pacific Games) has been played since 1963.

== Pacific Games ==
=== Men's tournament ===
Games	Year	Host city	Medals			Ref
Games	Year	Host city	Gold	Silver	Bronze	Ref
I	1963	Suva	French Polynesia	American Samoa	Fiji	
II	1966	Nouméa	French Polynesia	New Caledonia	Wallis and Futuna	
III	1969	Port Moresby	New Caledonia	Wallis and Futuna	New Caledonia	
IV	1971	Papeete	New Caledonia	French Polynesia	Western Samoa	
V	1975	Tumon	New Caledonia	French Polynesia	American Samoa	
VI	1979	Suva	American Samoa	New Caledonia	French Polynesia	
VII	1983	Apia	American Samoa	New Caledonia	French Polynesia	
VIII	1987	Nouméa	New Caledonia	American Samoa	Tahiti	
IX	1991	Port Moresby	Western Samoa	American Samoa	Tahiti	
X	1995	Papeete	Tahiti	New Caledonia	Fiji	
XI	1999	Santa Rita	Tahiti	Fiji	New Caledonia	
XII	2003	Suva	Tahiti	New Caledonia	Wallis and Futuna	
XIII	2007	Apia	Wallis and Futuna	Tahiti	New Caledonia	
XIV	2011	Nouméa	Wallis and Futuna	Tahiti	Papua New Guinea	
XV	2015	Port Moresby	Wallis and Futuna	New Caledonia	Tahiti	
XVI	2019	Apia	Tahiti	Wallis and Futuna	New Caledonia	

=== Women's tournament ===
Games	Year	Host city	Medals			Ref
Games	Year	Host city	Gold	Silver	Bronze	Ref
I	No women's tournament in 1963					
II	1966	Nouméa	French Polynesia	New Caledonia	Wallis and Futuna	
III	1969	Port Moresby	French Polynesia	Wallis and Futuna	New Caledonia	
IV	1971	Papeete	French Polynesia	New Caledonia	Wallis and Futuna	
V	1975	Tumon	New Caledonia	French Polynesia	Wallis and Futuna	
VI	1979	Suva	French Polynesia	New Caledonia	American Samoa	
VII	1983	Apia	French Polynesia	New Caledonia	American Samoa	(Note: Fiji sent women's teams to the SPG in 83, 91, 95 and 99; and to the SPMG in 97.)
VIII	1987	Nouméa	Tahiti	American Samoa	New Caledonia	
IX	1991	Port Moresby	Tahiti	Wallis and Futuna	American Samoa	
X	1995	Papeete	Tahiti	New Caledonia	Fiji	
XI	1999	Santa Rita	Tahiti	New Caledonia	Fiji	
XII	2003	Suva	Tahiti	New Caledonia	Samoa	
XIII	2007	Apia	Tahiti	Fiji	Samoa	
XIV	2011	Nouméa	Tahiti	New Caledonia	Samoa	
XV	2015	Port Moresby	American Samoa	Tahiti	New Caledonia	
XVI	2019	Apia	New Caledonia	Tahiti	Samoa	

== Pacific Mini Games ==
Indoor volleyball was introduced to the South Pacific Mini Games in 1997 at Pago Pago, American Samoa.

=== Men ===
Games	Year	Host city	Medals			Ref
Games	Year	Host city	Gold	Silver	Bronze	Ref
V	1997	Pago Pago	Western Samoa	American Samoa	Fiji	
VI–VIII	Volleyball not contested 2001–09					
IX	2013	Mata-Utu	Papua New Guinea	Wallis and Futuna	New Caledonia	

=== Women ===
Games	Year	Host city	Medals			Ref
Games	Year	Host city	Gold	Silver	Bronze	Ref
V	1997	Pago Pago	Tahiti	American Samoa	Fiji	
VI–VIII	Volleyball not contested 2001–09					
IX	2013	Mata-Utu	Tahiti	New Caledonia	Fiji	

== See also ==
- Beach volleyball at the Pacific Games
- Asian Men's Volleyball Championship
- Asian Women's Volleyball Championship
