= Swimming at the Pacific Games =

Swimming competitions have been held at the Pacific Games since the inaugural edition in 1963 at every Games except for 1983. Swimming has also been held once at the South Pacific Mini Games, in 2005.

== Pacific Games ==
=== Editions ===
Games	Year	Host city	Events			Top placed team	Ref
Games	Year	Host city	Men	Women	Total	Top placed team	Ref
I	1963	Suva	8	6^{a}	14^{a}	Fiji	
II	1966	Nouméa	10	9	19	New Caledonia	
III	1969	Port Moresby	10	9	19	New Caledonia	
IV	1971	Papeete	10	9	19	Papua New Guinea	
V	1975	Agana	12	9	21	French Polynesia	
VI	1979	Suva	12^{b}	12	24^{b}	French Polynesia	
VII	1983	Apia	Swimming not held – no facility^{c}				
VIII	1987	Nouméa	13	12	25	French Polynesia	
IX	1991	Port Moresby	16	16	32	French Polynesia	
X	1995	Papeete	16	16	32	New Caledonia	
XI	1999	Agana	17	17^{d}	34^{d}	New Caledonia	
XII	2003	Suva	20	20	40	New Caledonia	
XIII	2007	Apia	20	20	40	New Caledonia	
XIV	2011	Nouméa	20	20	40	New Caledonia	
XV	2015	Port Moresby	20	20	42^{e}	New Caledonia	
XVI	2019	Apia	20	20	42^{e}	New Caledonia	
XVII	2023	Honiara	20	20	43^{e}	New Caledonia	
XVIII	2027	Pirae					

== Pacific Mini Games ==
=== Editions ===
Games	Year	Host city	Events			Top placed team	Ref
Games	Year	Host city	Men	Women	Total	Top placed team	Ref
VII	2005	Meyuns	20	20	40	New Caledonia	

== See also ==
- List of Pacific Games records in swimming
- Swimming at the Commonwealth Games

== Notes ==
^ a The number of events does not include an unofficial 3 × 110 yd medley relay for women swum at the 1963 Games. Fiji and PNG finished first and second respectively but medals were not awarded.

^ b There were either 24 or 23 events on the 1979 programme, depending on whether the men's 4 × 200 metres relay was contested and officially included in the medals. There are conflicting sources of information cited (as of November 2015) and none sufficient to provide clarity. The men's 4 × 200 metres freestyle relay was not listed in the results published in the November 1979 issue of Pacific Islands Monthly (PIM). However, there are sources which suggest that the PIM published results might have some inaccuracies and could be incomplete:

1. The same PIM issue, two pages earlier, reports that Fiji won table tennis gold medals for both the women's team event and the women's doubles. However, only the women's doubles event is recorded in the PIM's list of results, and no women's (or men's) team event is included.
2. Also earlier in the same PIM issue, it is reported that "Papua New Guinea took the bronze" in the netball competition, behind Fiji and Cook Islands. However, in the PIM results for the netball, Tonga is listed as finishing in third place.
3. A publication from Guam's Political Status Education Coordinating Commission also states that the Guam swimmer Hollis Kimbrough, "won a record seven medals in the '79 SPG alone". As the PIM results show only four medals for Kimbrough plus two men's relay medals won by the Guam team, it may be the case that the men's 4 × 200 m event did take place but was missed in the results.

^ c Despite swimming being a compulsory sport for the South Pacific Games, there was no facility built in Apia to host swimming events for the 1983 Games.

^ d There were either 34 or 33 events on the 1999 programme, depending on whether the women's 4 × 200 metres relay was officially included in the medals. The medal list published on the Oceania Sport Information Centre (OSIC) website as of October 2015, omits the women's 4 × 200 m freestyle relay. However, the result sheet for the event records New Caledonia, Papua New Guinea and Northern Marianas as finishing first, second and third, respectively.

^ e Two mixed gender relay events were added to the schedule.

== Sources ==
- "Last of the Super Games/The Medal Winners" (PDF). Pacific Islands Monthly. 50 (10). 1979. Archived from the original on July 4, 2016.
- 1999 South Pacific Games Results. Oceania Sport Information Centre (Report). Archived from the original on 28 October 2015.
- 1999 South Pacific Games Medal Lists. Oceania Sport Information Centre (Report). Archived from the original on October 29, 2015.
