= Weightlifting at the Pacific Games =

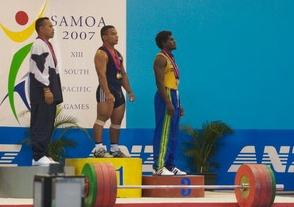
Gold medallist Manuel Minginfel of the Federated States of Micronesia on the medal dais with fellow competitors from the 56 kg class at Apia in 2007.

Weightlifting at the Pacific Games has been contested since 1966 when it was included as one of twelve sports at the Second South Pacific Games held in Nouméa, New Caledonia. A weightlifting competition for women was introduced in 1995 for the games in Papeete.

Weightlifting has also been included in many of the Pacific Mini Games, starting with the third edition held at Nuku'alofa, in Tonga, in 1989. It was at this Mini Games that the number of medals events in each weight division was increased from one (for the overall total) to three (by awarding extra medals for the snatch and clean and jerk). This rule change was then adopted for the main Pacific Games from 1991 onwards.

== Pacific Games ==
The weight classes contested at each Pacific Games for weightlifting are listed in the table below. The nationality of the gold medal winner for the combined total in each class is indicated by a flag icon and three letter country code, where this information is known; otherwise an (X) is used. Moving the cursor onto a country code with a dotted underline will reveal the name of the gold medal winner. A dash (–) indicates a weight division that was not contested. (Note: The number of weight classes used by the IWF has changed over the years and the definition of each class has also changed several times. – See: Weightlifting at the Summer Olympics.)

=== Men's weightlifting ===
Games		Host city	Weight class										Medal events	Refs
Games		Host city	Fly	Bantam	Feather	Light	Middle	Light Heavy	Middle Heavy	First Heavy	Heavy	Super Heavy	Medal events	Refs
I	1963	Suva	Not contested in 1963											
			–	56 kg	60 kg	67.5 kg	75 kg	82.5 kg	90 kg	–	90 kg+	–		
II	1966	Nouméa	–	FIJ	PNG	FIJ	WSM	WSM	FIJ	–	FIJ	–	7	(Note: Fiji won four weight divisions in 1966, Western Samoa won two and Papua and New Guinea won one.)
			52 kg	56 kg	60 kg	67.5 kg	75 kg	82.5 kg	90 kg	–	110 kg	110 kg+		
III	1969	Port Moresby	NCL	PNG	PNG	PNG	WSM	NCL	FIJ	–	FIJ	NCL	9	
IV	1971	Papeete	WSM	PNG	PNG	PNG	WSM	FIJ	WSM	–	WSM	NCL	9	
V	1975	Tumon	PNG	WSM	PNG	PNG	WSM	WSM	WSM	–	WSM	WSM	9	
			52 kg	56 kg	60 kg	67.5 kg	75 kg	82.5 kg	90 kg	100 kg	110 kg	110 kg+		
VI	1979	Suva	TAH	WSM	WSM	WSM	PNG	TAH	WSM	WSM	FIJ	WSM	10	
VII	1983	Apia	X	WSM	X	X	X	X	X	X	FIJ	X	10	
VIII	1987	Nouméa	PNG	PNG	PNG	WLF	TAH	PNG	TAH	TAH	TAH	WLF	10	
IX	1991	Port Moresby	PNG	WSM	WSM	NRU	WSM	PNG	ASM	WSM	ASM	WSM	30	
			54 kg	59 kg	64 kg	70 kg	76 kg	83 kg	91 kg	99 kg	108 kg	108 kg+		
X	1995	Papeete	FIJ	PNG	PNG	PNG	FIJ	WLF	PNG	COK	NCL	WLF	30	
			–	56 kg	62 kg	69 kg	77 kg	85 kg	94 kg	–	105 kg	105 kg+		
XI	1999	Santa Rita	–	FSM	NRU	SAM	NRU	SAM	NRU	–	WLF	NRU	24	
XII	2003	Suva	–	PNG	FSM	NRU	FIJ	KIR	SAM	–	NCL	NRU	24	
XIII	2007	Apia	–	FSM	NRU	FIJ	NRU	SAM	SAM	–	SAM	NRU	24	
XIV	2011	Nouméa	–	FIJ	FSM	NRU	TON	PNG	SAM	–	SAM	NRU	24	
XV	2015	Port Moresby	–	FIJ	PNG	FSM	PNG	SAM	PNG	–	KIR	NRU	24	
			55 kg	61 kg	67 kg	73 kg	81 kg	89 kg	96 kg	102 kg	109 kg	109 kg+		
XVI	2019	Apia	NRU	PNG	SAM	AUS	NZL	SAM	PNG	KIR	SAM	TGA	30	
XVII	2023	Honiara	MHL	SOL	SAM	SAM	KIR	AUS	SAM	SAM	FIJ	NZL	30	

=== Women's weightlifting ===
Games		Host city	Weight class										Medal events	Refs
Games		Host city	Fly	Bantam	Feather	Light	Middle	Light Heavy	Middle Heavy	First Heavy	Heavy	Super Heavy	Medal events	Refs
			–	–	54 kg	58 kg	64 kg	70 kg	76 kg	83 kg	–	83 kg+		
X	1995	Papeete	–	–	TAH	FIJ	TAH	TAH	TAH	TAH	–	WLF	21	
			–	48 kg	53 kg	58 kg	63 kg	69 kg	75 kg	–	–	75 kg+		
XI	1999	Santa Rita	–	NRU	NRU	NRU	FIJ	PNG	NRU	–	–	NRU	21	
XII	2003	Suva	–	NRU	PNG	NRU	FIJ	NRU	NRU	–	–	NRU	21	
XIII	2007	Apia	–	NRU	PNG	PNG	PLW	PNG	SAM	–	–	SAM	21	
XIV	2011	Nouméa	–	PNG	PNG	FIJ	PNG	PNG	SAM	–	–	SAM	21	
XV	2015	Port Moresby	–	PNG	AUS	SOL	AUS	PNG	SAM	–	–	SAM	21	
			45 kg	49 kg	55 kg	59 kg	64 kg	71 kg	76 kg	81 kg	87 kg	87 kg+		
XVI	2019	Apia	KIR	PNG	SOL	AUS	AUS	NRU	NZL	SAM	AUS	NZL	30	
XVII	2023	Honiara	GUM	PNG	SOL	MHL							30	

== Pacific Mini Games ==
=== Men's ===
Games		Host city	Weight class										Medal events	Refs
Games		Host city	Fly	Bantam	Feather	Light	Middle	Light Heavy	Middle Heavy	First Heavy	Heavy	Super Heavy	Medal events	Refs
			52 kg	56 kg	60 kg	67.5 kg	75 kg	82.5 kg	90 kg	100 kg	110 kg	110 kg+		
III	1989	Nuku'alofa	X	X	NRU	X	X	X	X	X	X	X	30	
			54 kg	59 kg	64 kg	70 kg	76 kg	83 kg	91 kg	99 kg	108 kg	108 kg+		
V	1997	Pago Pago	NRU	PNG	NRU	NRU	WSM	FIJ	–	NRU	NCL	ASM	27	
				56 kg	62 kg	69 kg	77 kg	85 kg	94 kg		105 kg	105 kg+		
VII	2005	Koror	–	NRU	FSM	FIJ	NRU	SAM	FIJ	–	SAM	NRU	24	
VIII	2009	Rarotonga	–	FIJ	FSM	KIR	FIJ	NRU	KIR	–	KIR	NRU	24	
IX	2013	Mata-Utu	–	X	X	X	X	X	X	–	X	X	24	
X	2017	Port Vila	–	FIJ	PNG	X	X	X	X	–	X	X	24	
			55 kg	61 kg	67 kg	73 kg	81 kg	89 kg	96 kg	102 kg	109 kg	109 kg+		
XI	2022	Saipan	NMI	PNG	KIR	TUV	PLW	AUS	TGA	NMI	NMI	NMI	30	

=== Women's ===
Games		Host city	Weight class										Medal events	Refs
Games		Host city	Fly	Bantam	Feather	Light	Middle	Light Heavy	Middle Heavy	First Heavy	Heavy	Super Heavy	Medal events	Refs
			46 kg	50 kg	54 kg	59 kg	64 kg	70 kg	76 kg	–	83 kg	83 kg+		
III	1989	Nuku'alofa	–	–	–	–	–	–	–	–	–	–	9	
V	1997	Pago Pago	NRU	NRU	NRU	NRU	NRU	NRU	NRU	–	NRU	FIJ	27	
				48 kg	53 kg	58 kg	63 kg	69 kg	75 kg		75 kg+			
VII	2005	Koror	–	NRU	PNG	PNG	PLW	FIJ	NRU	–	NRU	–	21	
VIII	2009	Rarotonga	–	–	–	FIJ	SAM	SAM	SAM	–	SAM	–	15	
IX	2013	Mata-Utu	–	X	–	X	X	X	X	–	X	–	18	
				48 kg	53 kg	58 kg	63 kg	69 kg	75 kg		90 kg	90 kg+		
X	2017	Port Vila	–	PNG	PNG	SOL	MHL	NZL	FIJ	–	FIJ	SAM	24	
			45 kg	49 kg	55 kg	59 kg	64 kg	71 kg	76 kg	81 kg	87 kg	87 kg+		
XI	2022	Saipan	GUM	PNG	SOL	AUS	GUM	AUS	AUS	SAM	AUS	SAM	30	

== See also ==
- Weightlifting at the Commonwealth Games
- Weightlifting at the Summer Olympics
