= Judo at the Pacific Games =

Judo competitions

Judo has been contested at the Pacific Games since 1969 when it was included in the Third South Pacific Games held in Port Moresby.| Judo has also been included at the Pacific Mini Games held at Port Vila in 2017.

== Pacific Games ==
The Judo events (contested as weight classes as well as open divisions) at each Pacific Games are listed in the table below. Flag icons and three letter country code indicate the nationality of the gold medal winner of an event, where this information is known; otherwise an (X) is used. Moving the cursor onto a country code with a dotted underline will reveal the name of the gold medal winner. A dash (–) indicates a division that was not contested. (Note: The number of weight classes has changed over the years and the definition of each class has also changed several times.)

=== Men's judo ===
Games		Host city	Weight class							Team event	Open		Medal events	Refs
Games		Host city	Extra Light	Half Light	Light	Half Middle	Middle	Half Heavy	Heavy	Team event	Light- weight	No limit	Medal events	Refs
					−63 kg	63–70 kg	70–80 kg	80–93 kg	93 kg+					
III	1969	Port Moresby	–	–	NCL	NCL	NCL	NCL	–	–	–	NCL	5	
IV	1971	Papeete	–	–	GUM	TAH	TAH	TAH	NCL	–	–	GUM	6	
V	1975	Tumon	–	–	X	X	X	X	X	X	–	–	6	
			−60 kg	60–65 kg	65–71 kg	71–78 kg	78–86 kg	86–95 kg	95 kg+					
VI	1979	Suva	NCL	NCL	TAH	NCL	FIJ	NCL	GUM	NCL	–	GUM	9	
VII	1983	Apia	Not contested											
VIII	1987	Nouméa	NCL	NCL	NCL	NCL	NCL	FIJ	GUM	NCL	–	FIJ	9	
IX	1991	Port Moresby	Not contested											
X	1995	Papeete	X	X	X	X	X	X	X	X	–	X	9	
XI	1999	Santa Rita	X	X	X	X	X	X	X	X	–	X	9	
			−60 kg	60–66 kg	66–73 kg	73–81 kg	81–90 kg	90–100 kg	100 kg+					
XII	2003	Suva	X	X	X	X	X	X	X	X	–	X	9	
XIII	2007	Apia	X	X	X	X	X	X	X	X	–	X	9	
XIV	2011	Nouméa	X	X	X	X	X	X	X	X	–	X	9	
XV	2015	Port Moresby	Not contested											
XVI	2019	Apia	X	X	X	X	X	X	X	X	X	X	10	

=== Women's judo ===
Games		Host city	Weight class							Team event	Open		Medal events	Refs
Games		Host city	Extra Light	Half Light	Light	Half Middle	Middle	Half Heavy	Heavy	Team event	Light- weight	No limit	Medal events	Refs
			−48 kg	48–52 kg	52–56 kg	56–61 kg	61–66 kg	66–72 kg	72 kg+					
X	1995	Papeete	X	X	X	X	X	X	X	X	–	X	9	
XI	1999	Santa Rita	X	X	X	X	X	X	X	X	–	X	9	
			−48 kg	48–52 kg	52–57 kg	57–63 kg	63–70 kg	70–78 kg	78 kg+					
XII	2003	Suva	X	X	X	X	X	X	X	X	–	X	9	
XIII	2007	Apia	X	X	X	X	X	X	X	X	–	X	9	
XIV	2011	Nouméa	X	X	X	X	X	X	X	X	–	X	9	
XV	2015	Port Moresby	Not contested											
XVI	2019	Apia	X	X	X	X	X	X	X	X	X	X	10	

== Pacific Mini Games ==
=== Men's ===
Games		Host city	Weight class							Team event	Open		Medal events	Refs
Games		Host city	Extra Light	Half Light	Light	Half Middle	Middle	Half Heavy	Heavy	Team event	Light- weight	No limit	Medal events	Refs
			−60 kg	60–66 kg	66–73 kg	73–81 kg	81–90 kg	90–100 kg	100 kg+					
XVI	2017	Port Vila	SOL	NRU	NCL	NCL	NCL	NCL	TGA	–	NCL	NCL	9	

=== Women's ===
Games		Host city	Weight class							Team event	Open		Medal events	Refs
Games		Host city	Extra Light	Half Light	Light	Half Middle	Middle	Half Heavy	Heavy	Team event	Light- weight	No limit	Medal events	Refs
			−48 kg	48–52 kg	52–57 kg	57–63 kg	63–70 kg	70–78 kg	78 kg+					
XVI	2017	Port Vila	–	NCL	NCL	NCL	FIJ	–	–	–	NCL	NCL	6	

== See also ==
- Judo at the Commonwealth Games
- Judo at the Summer Olympics
