= Table tennis at the Pacific Games =

Table tennis at the Pacific Games has been contested since 1963 when it was included as one of ten sports at the First South Pacific Games held in Suva, Fiji.

Table tennis has also been played at many of the Pacific Mini Games, starting with the first edition held at Honiara in 1981.

== Pacific Games ==
Flag icons and three letter country code indicate the nationality of the gold medal winner of an event, where this information is known; otherwise an (X) is used. Moving the cursor onto a country code with a dotted underline will reveal the name of the gold medal winner. A dash (–) indicates an event not contested.

Games	Year	Host city	Men's					Mixed Doubles or Team	Women's					Total events	Refs
Games	Year	Host city	Singles	Doubles	Ambulant	Seated	Team	Mixed Doubles or Team	Team	Seated	Ambulant	Doubles	Singles	Total events	Refs
I	1963	Suva	–	–	–	–	–	FIJ	–	–	–	–	–	1	
II	1966	Nouméa	–	–	–	–	TAH	TAH	TAH	–	–	–	–	3	
III	1969	Port Moresby	–	–	–	–	TAH	NCL	NCL	–	–	–	–	3	
IV	1971	Papeete	PNG	PNG	–	–	FIJ	NCL	FIJ	–	–	NCL	NCL	7	
V	1975	Tumon	TAH	TAH	–	–	TAH	TAH	FIJ	–	–	FIJ	TAH	7	
VI	1979	Suva	X	X	–	–	X	X	X	–	–	X	X	7	
VII	1983	Apia	GUM	GUM	–	–	X	TAH	X	–	–	NCL	NCL	7	
VIII	1987	Nouméa	X	X	–	–	X	X	X	–	–	X	X	7	
IX	1991	Port Moresby	X	X	–	–	X	X	X	–	–	X	X	7	
X	1995	Papeete	X	X	–	–	X	X	X	–	–	X	X	7	
XI	1999	Santa Rita	X	X	–	–	X	X	X	–	–	X	X	7	
XII	2003	Suva	X	X	–	–	X	X	X	–	–	X	X	7	
XIII	2007	Apia	NCL	NCL	–	–	NCL	TAH	VAN	–	–	NCL	VAN	7	
XIV	2011	Nouméa	TAH	NCL	–	–	TAH	TAH	TAH	–	–	NCL	NCL	7	
XV	2015	Port Moresby	TAH	TAH	NCL	FIJ	TAH	TAH	TAH	FIJ	NCL	TAH	TAH	11	
XV	2019	Apia	Vanuatu												
XV	2023	Honiara	TAH												

== Pacific Mini Games ==
Games	Year	Host city	Men's					Mixed Doubles	Women's					Total events	Refs
Games	Year	Host city	Singles	Doubles	Ambulant	Seated	Team	Mixed Doubles	Team	Seated	Ambulant	Doubles	Singles	Total events	Refs
VII	2005	Koror	X	X	–	–	X	X	X	–	–	X	X	7	
VIII	2009	Rarotonga	VAN	VAN	–	–	NIU	TAH	VAN	–	–	VAN	VAN	7	
X	2017	Port Vila	X	X	X	X	X	X	X	X	X	X	X	11	

== See also ==
- Table tennis at the Summer Olympics
