= Triathlon at the Pacific Games =

Triathlon at the Pacific Games was first contested at the 1995 games at Papeete. It has also been included in the Pacific Mini Games, firstly at Norfolk Island in 2001.

The Sprint format (half the Olympic distance) has been used for triathlons at the Pacific Games since 2011. Prior to that, the standard course Olympic distance was raced. The Aquathon, with swim and run legs only, has also been contested.

== Pacific Games ==
Flag icons and three letter country code indicate the nationality of the gold medal winner of an event, where this information is known; otherwise an (X) is used. Moving the cursor onto a country code with a dotted underline will reveal the name of the gold medal winner. A dash (–) indicates an event that was not contested.

=== Winners ===
Games	Year	Host city	Men's		Mixed team		Women's		Total events	Notes
Games	Year	Host city	Triathlon	Aquathon	Triathlon	Aquathon	Triathlon	Aquathon	Total events	Notes
X	1995	Papeete	NCL	–	NCL	–	TAH	–	3	(Note: Three events were contested, men's and women's individual races and a mixed team competition. The standard course (Olympic) triathlon format was used and a total of nine medals were awarded. New Caledonia won five medals: 2 gold, 2 silver, and 1 bronze. The host nation Tahiti won two medals: 1 gold, and 1 silver. Guam won the remaining two medals: 2 bronze – for the women's race (Tiffany Larscheid); and team event (Jay Donovan, Jeff Miller, Tiffany Larscheid).)
XI	1999	Santa Rita	TAH	–	NCL	–	GUM	–	3	(Note: 1999: Men's and women's individual races and a mixed team event (based on finishing places) were again contested, with a total of nine medals being awarded. Hosts Guam won three medals: 1 gold, 1 silver, and 1 bronze. New Caledonia also won three medals: 1 gold and 2 bronze. Tahiti won two medals: 1 gold and 1 silver, and Northern Marianas took home 1 silver medal.)
XII	2003	Suva	NCL	–	NCL	–	NCL	–	3	(Note: New Caledonia dominated all three triathlon events in 2003, winning seven of the nine medals awarded: 3 gold, 2 silver and 2 bronze. Tahiti won 1 silver medal, and Northern Marianas won 1 bronze medal.)
XIII	2007	Apia	NCL	–	NCL	–	NCL	–	3	(Note: 2007: All three triathlon events were again dominated by New Caledonia, with six medals won: 3 gold, 1 silver and 2 bronze. Tahiti won 2 silver medals, and Cook Islands won 1 bronze medal.)
XIV	2011	Nouméa	NCL	–	NCL	–	TAH	–	3	(Note: The triathlon format was changed to the shorter sprint distance (half the Olympic course) at Nouméa in 2011. Hosts New Caledonia won four medals: 2 gold and 2 silver. Tahiti also won four medals: 1 gold, 1 silver and 2 bronze. Guam took home 1 bronze medal.)
XV	2015	Port Moresby	NCL	–	NCL	–	NCL	–	3	(Note: The shorter sprint distance (half the Olympic course) was used again at Port Moresby in 2015. New Caledonia won five medals: 3 gold and 2 bronze. Tahiti won 3 silver medals and Guam won 1 bronze medal.)
XVI	2019	Apia	TAH	TAH	TAH	TAH	NCL	TAH	6	(Note: 2019: Sprint triathlon (half the Olympic course) as well as aquathon events were contested at Apia. Tahiti won five of the six gold medals on offer; all of the men's and team events, as well as the women's aquathon. New Caledonia won the gold medal for the women's triathlon.)

=== Medal table ===
These are the all time medal standings for triathlon and aquathon events at the Pacific Games up to and including the 2019 games:

All-time medal table – Pacific Games Triathlon and Aquathon
Rank	Nation	Gold	Silver	Bronze	Total
1	New Caledonia	15	11	13	39
2	Tahiti	8	11	2	21
3	Guam	1	1	5	7
4	Northern Marianas	0	1	1	2
5	Cook Islands	0	0	1	1
5	Fiji	0	0	1	1
5	Samoa	0	0	1	1
Totals (7 entries)		24	24	24	72

== Pacific Mini Games ==
=== Past winners ===
Games	Year	Host city	Men's		Mixed team		Women's		Total events	Notes
Games	Year	Host city	Triathlon	Aquathon	Triathlon	Aquathon	Triathlon	Aquathon	Total events	Notes
VI	2001	Kingston	TAH	–	NCL	–	NCL	–	3	(Note: 2001: Men's and women's individual races and a mixed team event were contested. The standard course (Olympic) triathlon format was used and a total of nine medals were awarded. New Caledonia won four medals: 2 gold, and 2 bronze. Tahiti won three medals: 1 gold, and 2 silver. Cook Islands won 1 silver medal, and Northern Marianas won 1 bronze medal.)
VII	2005	Koror	–	NCL	–	NMI	–	NMI	3	(Note: 2005: Aquathon races (run/swim/run legs) were conducted at Koror after road works were not completed in time to allow the bike leg of the triathlon to proceed. There were only seven medals won as silver and bronze were not awarded in the mixed team event because only two teams had sufficient athletes entered. Host nation Northern Marianas won three medals (2 gold, and 1 bronze). New Caledonia won two medals: 1 gold, and 1 silver. Fiji won 1 silver medal, and Cook Islands won 1 bronze.)
VIII	2009	Rarotonga	NCL	–	NCL	–	NCL	–	3	(Note: 2009: Three events were contested within the Avatiu wharf area; men's and women's individual races and a mixed team competition. The standard course (Olympic) triathlon format was used and a total of nine medals were awarded. New Caledonia won six medals: 3 gold, 1 silver, and 2 bronze. Tahiti won 2 silver medals. Host nation Cook Islands won 1 bronze medal in the mixed team event (Geoff Stoddart, Thomas Henderson and Jennie George).)

=== Medal tally ===
These are the all time medal standings for triathlon and aquathon at the Pacific Mini Games up to and including 2009:

All-time medal table – Pacific Mini Games Triathlon and Aquathon
Rank	Nation	Gold	Silver	Bronze	Total
1	New Caledonia	6	2	4	12
2	Northern Marianas	2	0	2	4
3	Tahiti	1	4	0	5
4	Cook Islands	0	1	2	3
5	Fiji	0	1	0	1
Totals (5 entries)		9	8	8	25

== Sources ==
- 1995 South Pacific Games Results. Oceania Sport Information Centre (Report). Archived from the original on 30 October 2015.
- 1999 South Pacific Games Results. Oceania Sport Information Centre (Report). Archived from the original on 28 October 2015.
- 6th South Pacific Mini Games: Norfolk Island 3rd to 14th December 2001 (PDF 6.5 MB) (Report). Norfolk Island Amateur Sports & Commonwealth Games Association. 2001. Archived from the original on 26 October 2017.
- 2003 South Pacific Games Results. Oceania Sport Information Centre (Report). Archived from the original on 31 October 2015.
- 2007 South Pacific Games Results. Oceania Sport Information Centre (Report). Archived from the original on 31 October 2015.
- VIIIth Pacific Mini Games Report (Report). 2009. pp. 35–36. Archived from the original on 24 September 2015.
- 2011 Pacific Games Results. Oceania Sport Information Centre (Report). Archived from the original on 31 October 2015.
