= Outrigger canoeing at the Pacific Games =

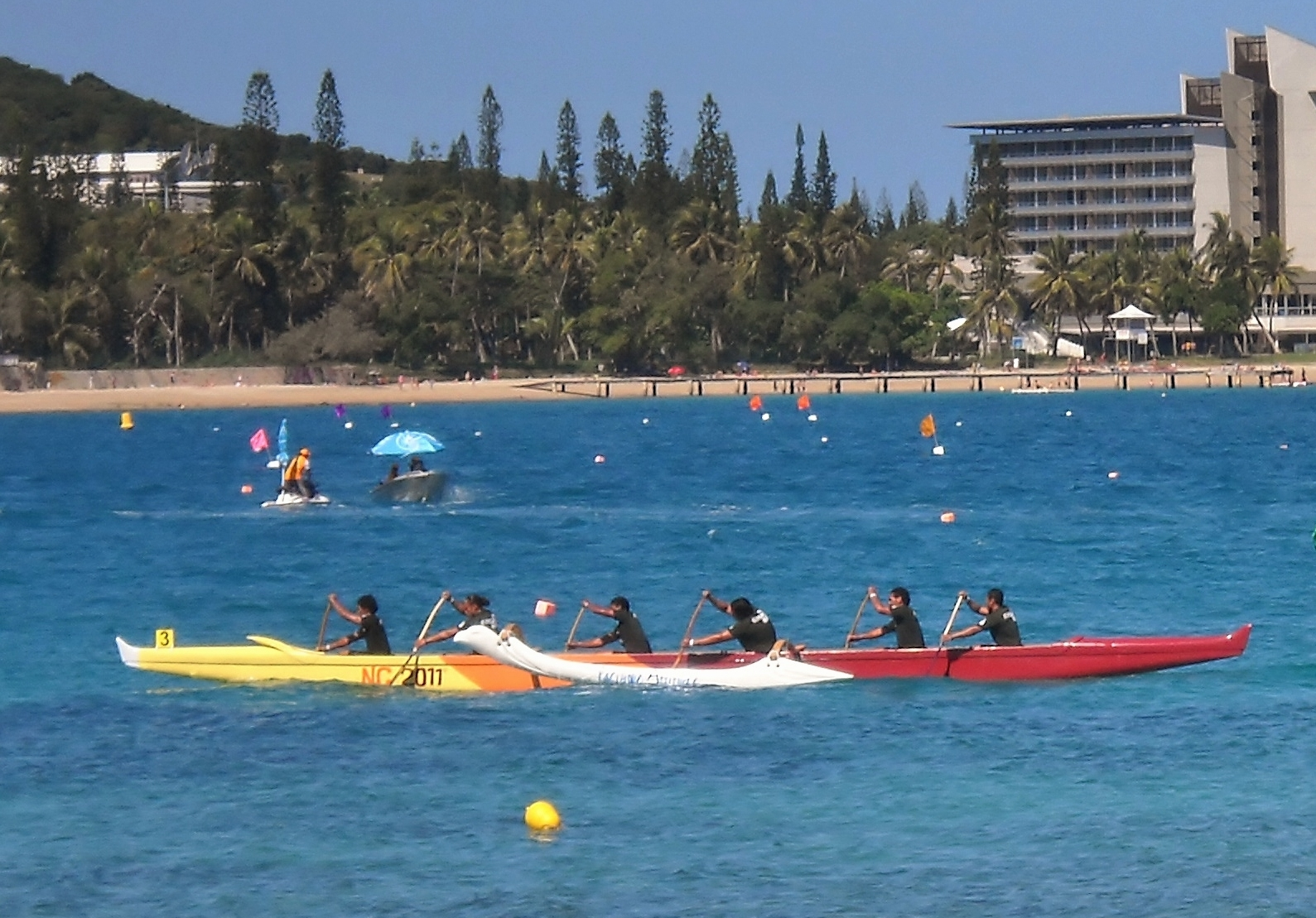
Va'a outrigger canoe at Anse Vata Beach for the 2011 Pacific Games.

Outrigger canoeing, mostly using va'a canoes, has been contested at the Pacific Games since the 1995 edition held in Papeete, Tahiti. The va'a rudderless outrigger has been raced at all regattas, although the "Galaide II" outrigger canoe with rudder has also been used. Tahiti has dominated the competition since inception, topping the medal count at all regattas the country has attended. The Pacific Mini Games has also hosted va'a regattas, with the first events held in Koror, Palau at the 2005 Mini Games.

== Pacific Games ==
=== Editions ===
Games	Year	Host location	Events			Top team	Ref
Games	Year	Host location	Men	Women	Total	Top team	Ref
X	1995	Papeete	4	4	8	Tahiti	
XI	1999	Tumon Bay	5	5	10	Tahiti	
XII	2003	Suva	6	6	12	Tahiti	
XIII	2007	Apia	5	5	10	Tahiti	
XIV	2011	Nouméa	6	6	12	Tahiti	
XV	2015	Port Moresby	6	6	12	Tahiti	
XVI	2019	Apia	6	6	12	Tahiti	
XVII	2023	Honiara	6	6	12		

== Pacific Mini Games ==
=== Summary ===
Games	Year	Host location	Events			Top team	Ref
Games	Year	Host location	Men	Women	Total	Top team	Ref
VII	2005	Koror	5	5	10	New Caledonia	
VIII	2009	Rarotonga	5	5	10	Tahiti	
IX	2013	Gahi	6	6	12	Tahiti	
XI	2022	Saipan	6	6	12		
