= American Samoa women's national volleyball team =

National sports team

American Samoa
- Association: American Samoa Volleyball Association
- Confederation: AVC
- Head coach: Anthony Ta'atiti
- FIVB ranking: NR (24 May 2026)

Uniforms
Home	Away
Honours
Pacific Games
Gold medal – first place	2015 Port Moresby
Silver medal – second place	1987 Nouméa
Bronze medal – third place	1979 Suva
Bronze medal – third place	1983 Apia
Bronze medal – third place	1991 Port Moresby
Pacific Mini Games
Gold medal – first place	2025 Koror
Silver medal – second place	1997 Pago Pago
Oceania Championships
Silver medal – second place	2026 Mangilao

The American Samoa women's national volleyball team represents American Samoa in international women's volleyball competitions and friendly matches, and is governed by the American Samoa Volleyball Association (ASVBA).

== Medals ==
Event	Gold	Silver	Bronze	Total
Pacific Games	1	1	3	5
Pacific Mini Games	1	1	0	2
Oceania Championships	0	1	0	1
Total	2	3	3	8
