= Archery at the Pacific Games =

Archery at the Pacific Games was first contested at the 1971 games at Papeete. Archery was made a core sport in 2021, and is thus required to be included at every subsequent edition of the Pacific Games. It has also been included in the Pacific Mini Games, firstly at Norfolk Island in 2001 and then Port Vila in 2017.

== Pacific Games ==
Flag icons and three letter country code indicate the nationality of the gold medal winner of an event, where this information is known; otherwise an (X) is used. Moving the cursor onto a country code with a dotted underline will reveal the name of the gold medal winner. A dash (–) indicates an event that was not contested.

=== Outdoor range ===
==== Winners: Recurve bow ====
Games	Year	Host city	Men's			Mixed team	Women's			Total events	Notes
Games	Year	Host city	Full round	Matchplay	Team	Mixed team	Team	Matchplay	Full round	Total events	Notes
IV	1971	Papeete	FIJ	–	FIJ	–	–	–	–	2	(Note: 1971: Pacific Islands Monthly (PIM) reported visiting archers describing the range used in Papeete as the worst archery field they had ever shot on, being configured with targets always in shadow and built near a gully with gusting wind eddies and noisy traffic, resulting in shooting scores hardly up to club standard. While PIM also stated: Archery is a mixed sport, played for the first time at Papeete, it seems all reported medal winners were men. The exact competition format was not recorded in the official results but, based on the scores, it is likely a Double 1440 Round (at range distances of 90, 70, 50 and 30 metres for men) was used. It is assumed for the purposes of this article that both the individual and team events were in the category of recurve for men. Fiji won the gold medal in both events.)
V	1975	Tumon	PNG	–	TAH	–	–	–	–	2	(Note: 1975: Two medal events were held. Dick Smith won gold for Papua New Guinea in the individual round. Tahiti won gold in the team event.)
X	1995	Papeete	TAH	–	TAH	–	–	–	–	2	(Note: 1995: Outdoor and indoor range events for men were hosted, with hosts Tahiti winning six gold medals and New Caledonia winning two.)
XII	2003	Suva	TAH	TAH	–	–	–	NCL	NCL	4	(Note: 2003: Both outdoor range archery and field archery were hosted. Only individual events were contested; no team competition. For the outdoor range archery at Indian College in Suva, medal events contested were the FITA Round (1440) and Match Round (including ranking round (Canadian 1200) and match play). The Field Shoot FITA event, consisting of 24 marked targets with 3 arrows shot at each target was held at Pacific Harbour. Four target face sizes were used (80 cm, 60 cm, 40 cm, and 20 cm) at various distances ranging from 10 m to 60 m. Tahiti's Jean-Pierre Winkelstroeter won all three gold medals in the men's recurve. New Caledonia's Catherine Gougeon and Laurent Clerc clean-swept all gold medals in the women's recurve and men's compound events, respectively. In the women's compound bow, Fiji's Shanti Cook won two gold medals, and Tahiti's Teroro Flores won the other gold.)
XIII	2007	Apia	TAH	TAH	TAH	TAH	–	SAM	NCL	6	(Note: 2007: New Caledonia swept all five available events in the compound bow, with Laurent Clerte and Emmanuelle Guilhard claiming three gold medals each. New Caledonia also took out the recurve women's 1440, thanks to Isabelle Soero's winning score of 1137 points. Samoa's Pualele Atoa-Craig secured home gold for the host nation in the final of recurve women's individual event, however, winning 93–84 in her head-to-head match with Soero. Tahiti won all three medals in the men's recurve category and also took the recurve mixed team event, with Teiva Winklestroeter finishing the tournament with four gold medals.)
XIV	2011	Nouméa	FIJ	TAH	NCL	TAH	–	NCL	NCL	6	(Note: 2011: Host team New Caledonia led the way with seven gold medals: three in recurve events, and four in compound events. Three gold medals went to Tahiti, and one gold medal each was won by Fiji, and Samoa. Formats used were full 1440 rounds for individuals, and match play rounds for individuals and teams.)
XVI	2019	Apia	FIJ	TAH	–	SAM	–	NCL	SAM	5	(Note: 2019: Formats used were: full 1440 rounds for individuals; and match play rounds for individuals and mixed teams.)

==== Winners: Compound bow ====
Games	Year	Host city	Men's			Mixed team	Women's			Total events	Notes
Games	Year	Host city	Full round	Matchplay	Team	Mixed team	Team	Matchplay	Full round	Total events	Notes
X	1995	Papeete	TAH	–	TAH	–	–	–	–	2	
XII	2003	Suva	NCL	NCL	–	–	–	TAH	FIJ	4	
XIII	2007	Apia	NCL	NCL	–	NCL	–	NCL	NCL	5	
XIV	2011	Nouméa	NCL	TAH	NCL	NCL	–	SAM	NCL	6	
XVI	2019	Apia	NCL	FIJ	–	FIJ	–	NCL	NCL	5	

=== Indoor and Field ===
==== Winners: Recurve ====
Games	Year	Host city	Men's Field	Men's Indoor		Mixed Indoor Team	Women's Indoor		Women's Field	Total events	Notes
Games	Year	Host city	Men's Field	Individual	Team	Mixed Indoor Team	Team	Individual	Women's Field	Total events	Notes
X	1995	Papeete	–	NCL	NCL	–	–	–	–	2	
XII	2003	Suva	TAH	–	–	–	–	–	NCL	2	

==== Winners: Compound ====
Games	Year	Host city	Men's Field	Men's Indoor		Mixed Indoor Team	Women's Indoor		Women's Field	Total events	Notes
Games	Year	Host city	Men's Field	Individual	Team	Mixed Indoor Team	Team	Individual	Women's Field	Total events	Notes
X	1995	Papeete	–	TAH	TAH	–	–	–	–	2	
XII	2003	Suva	NCL	–	–	–	–	–	FIJ	2	

== Pacific Mini Games ==
=== Outdoor ===
==== Recurve bow ====
Games	Year	Host city	Men's			Mixed team	Women's			Total events	Notes
Games	Year	Host city	Full round	Matchplay	Team	Mixed team	Team	Matchplay	Full round	Total events	Notes
VI	2001	Kingston	TAH	TAH	–	–	–	NCL	NCL	4	(Note: 2001: Both outdoor range archery and field archery were hosted, with 12 recurve archers and 11 compound bow archers attending. Only individual events were contested; no team competition. For outdoor range archery at the Central School, events contested were the Canadian Round (1200) and Oceania Round (including ranking round and matchplay). The Field Shoot event was held at the Melanesian Mission at Headstone.)
X	2017	Port Vila	–	FIJ	–	NCL	–	NCL	–	3	(Note: 2017: Six events in outdoor range archery were contested at Port Vila: men's individual, women's individual and mixed team rounds for both recurve and compound bows. On the first day a 720 round was used as the qualification in each discipline. The mixed team elimination and matchplay rounds took place on day two, with New Caledonia winning both gold medals. Men's and women's individual elimination and matchplay rounds took place on day three.)

==== Compound bow ====
Games	Year	Host city	Men's			Mixed team	Women's			Total events	Notes
Games	Year	Host city	Full round	Matchplay	Team	Mixed team	Team	Matchplay	Full round	Total events	Notes
VI	2001	Kingston	TAH	NCL	–	–	–	FIJ	FIJ	4	
X	2017	Port Vila	–	NCL	–	NCL	–	NCL	–	3	

=== Field and indoor ===
==== Recurve ====
Games	Year	Host city	Men's Field	Men's Indoor		Mixed Indoor Team	Women's Indoor		Women's Field	Total events	Notes
Games	Year	Host city	Men's Field	Individual	Team	Mixed Indoor Team	Team	Individual	Women's Field	Total events	Notes
VI	2001	Kingston	TAH	–	–	–	–	–	NCL	2	

==== Compound ====
Games	Year	Host city	Men's Field	Men's Indoor		Mixed Indoor Team	Women's Indoor		Women's Field	Total events	Notes
Games	Year	Host city	Men's Field	Individual	Team	Mixed Indoor Team	Team	Individual	Women's Field	Total events	Notes
VI	2001	Kingston	TAH	–	–	–	–	–	FIJ	2	

== See also ==
- Archery at the Asian Games
- Archery at the Summer Olympics
