= Beach volleyball at the Pacific Games =

Beach volleyball at the Pacific Games has been contested since 1999 when the sport was included at the Eleventh South Pacific Games held in Guam. Since that time, Beach volleyball has been one of the core sports of the Pacific Games, required to be included for both men and women in every games. It has also been included in some of the Pacific Mini Games, starting with the seventh edition held in Palau in 2005.

== Pacific Games ==
=== Men's tournament ===
Games		Host city	Final			Third play-off			Ref
Games		Host city	Gold	Score	Silver	Bronze	Score	4th place	Ref
XI	1999	Santa Rita	(Samoa); Lomitusi Pritchard; Kennaway Maisa	1–0	(Wallis and Futuna); Soane Maugateau; P. Tufale	(Fiji); Waisale Suka; Apenisa Saukuru	1–0	(Guam); Bert Mercado; Brian Goolsby	
XII	2003	Suva	(French Polynesia); Steeve Tuihani; Axel Vaki	2–0	(Tonga); Tio Fonohema; Soane Vaipulu	(Fiji); Waisale Suka; Rupeni Nainima	2–1	(Samoa) ?	
XIII	2007	Apia	(French Polynesia); Maheanuu Hapiatahaa; Dino Tauraa	2–1	(Fiji); Waisale Suka; Eroni Suasua	(Tonga); Kama Manulevu; Tio Fonohema	2–0	Jon Taoupoulou; Anselmen Wea	
XIV	2011	Nouméa	(Fiji); Aisake Raratabu; Waisale Suka	2–1	Frantz Gouzenes; Yvannick Iwa	(French Polynesia); Dino Tauraa; Vatea Tauraa	2–1	(American Samoa); Sigalu Selefuti Aitui; Sam Samasoni Sam	
XV	2015	Port Moresby	(Papua New Guinea); Richard Kilarupa; Moha Mea	2–0	(Fiji); Aisake Raratabu; Waisale Suka	(American Samoa); Miles Muagututia; Sigalu Aitui	2–0	(Tonga); Metuisela Vainikolo; Salesi Tuakoi	
XVI	2019	Apia	(Australia); Tim Dickson; Marcus Ferguson	2–1	(French Polynesia); Terau Ena; Jeremie Paraue	(Tonga); Semisi Funaki; Tio Fonohema	2–1	(American Samoa); Sigalu Aitui; Tauvela Fagaima	
XVII	2023	Honiara	(Australia)	–	(Tuvalu)	(Northern Mariana Islands)	–	(Solomon Islands)	
XVIII	2027			–			–		

=== Women's tournament ===
Games		Host city	Final			Third play-off			Ref
Games		Host city	Gold	Score	Silver	Bronze	Score	4th place	Ref
XI	1999	Santa Rita	(Fiji); Mereula Meya; Sanimelia Francis	round robin	(Solomon Islands); Suzie Leong; Gabriella Diau	(Papua New Guinea); Dorothy Kivung; Alice Ito	round robin	(Guam); Regina Ferguson; Lisa Bordallo	
XII	2003	Suva	(Fiji); Mereula Meya; Finau Waqa	2–0	(French Polynesia); Raurea Temarii; Lokelani Vero	?	2–0	(Solomon Islands); Suzie Leong; Gabriella Diau	
XIII	2007	Apia	(French Polynesia); Lokelani Vero; Taiana Tere	2–1	(Fiji); Mereula Meya; Finau Waqa	(Vanuatu); Henriette Iatika; Miller Elwin	2–1	Armonie Konhu; Aurelie Konhu	
XIV	2011	Nouméa	(Vanuatu); Linline Matauatu; Miller Elwin	2–0	Sulita Malivao; Sylvie Mero	(French Polynesia); Kahaialanie Tauraa; Ramata Temarii	2–0	(Papua New Guinea); Raka Tai; Dianne Moia	
XV	2015	Port Moresby	(American Samoa); Rachelle Suaava; Litara Sisitina	2–1	(Vanuatu); Loti Joe; Leeslyn Ler	(French Polynesia); Vaimiti Lee Tham; Heiani Vaki	2–1	(Papua New Guinea); Alice Ito; Diane Moia	
XVI	2019	Apia	(Vanuatu); Miller Pata (née Elwin); Sherysyn Toko	2–0	(French Polynesia); Vaihere Fareura; Emere Maau	(American Samoa); Litara Keil; Deveney Pula	2–0	(Solomon Islands); Rose Gwali; Hannah Donga	
XVII	2023	Honiara	(Australia)	–	(Solomon Islands)	(Vanuatu)	–	(Fiji)	
XVIII	2027			–			–		

=== Medal table ===
These are the all time medal standings in Pacific Games beach volleyball for both men and women since 1999, updated to include 2019.

All-time medal table – Pacific Games Beach Volleyball
Rank	Nation	Gold	Silver	Bronze	Total
1	Tahiti (TAH)	3	3	3	9
2	Fiji (FIJ)	3	3	2	8
3	Vanuatu (VAN)	2	1	1	4
4	American Samoa (ASM)	1	0	2	3
5	Papua New Guinea (PNG)	1	0	1	2
6	Australia (AUS)	1	0	0	1
6	Samoa (SAM)	1	0	0	1
8	New Caledonia	0	2	1	3
9	Tonga (TGA)	0	1	2	3
10	Solomon Islands (SOL)	0	1	0	1
10	Wallis and Futuna (WLF)	0	1	0	1
Totals (11 entries)		12	12	12	36

== Pacific Mini Games ==
=== Men's ===
Games		Host city	Final			Third play-off			Ref
Games		Host city	Gold	Score	Silver	Bronze	Score	4th place	Ref
VII	2005	Koror	(Tonga); Tio Fonohema; Samuela Fotu	2–0	Petelo Manuopuava; Jon Taoupoulou	(Guam); David Rillera; Brian Matanane	2–1	(Wallis and Futuna); Soane Tuitoga; Vitali Petelo Tupou	
IX	2013	Mata-Utu	(French Polynesia); Terau Ena; Steve Tauraa	2–0	(Samoa) ?	(Papua New Guinea); Richard Batari; Harry Omoa	2–0	(Tonga); Samuela Fotu; Tio Fonohema	
X	2017	Port Vila	(Papua New Guinea); Moha Mea; Richard Kilarupa	2–1	(Samoa); Eneliko Tui; Ioane Lesoa	(Fiji); Nacanieli Elliott; Inia Korowale	2–0	(Tonga); Salesi Tuakoi; Semisi Funaki	
XI	2022	Saipan		–			–		
XII	2025			–			–		

=== Women's ===
Games		Host city	Final			Third play-off			Ref
Games		Host city	Gold	Score	Silver	Bronze	Score	4th place	Ref
VII	2005	Koror	(Fiji); Mereula Meya; Agnes Tuilevuka	2–0	Hajen Atrea; Armonie Konhu	(Guam); Lisette Bordallo; Aubrey Posadas	2–1	(Solomon Islands); Rose Gwali; Susie Leong	
IX	2013	Mata-Utu	(Vanuatu); Joyce Joshua; Linline Matauatu	2–0	(Papua New Guinea); Leontine Ono; Hazel Ruga	(Solomon Islands) ?	2–1	(Palau); Hila Asanuma; Holly Yamada	
X	2017	Port Vila	(Vanuatu); Loti Joe; Linline Matautu	2–0	(Solomon Islands); Rose Gwali; Hanah Donga	(Fiji); Laite Nima; Iliseva Ratudina	2–0	(Papua New Guinea); Emily Bae; Michelle Walo	
XI	2022	Saipan		–			–		
XII	2025			–			–		

=== Medal tally ===
These are the all time medal standings in Pacific Mini Games beach volleyball for both men and women since 2005, updated to include 2017.

All-time medal table – Pacific Mini Games Beach Volleyball
Rank	Nation	Gold	Silver	Bronze	Total
1	Vanuatu (VAN)	2	0	0	2
2	Papua New Guinea (PNG)	1	1	1	3
3	Fiji (FIJ)	1	0	2	3
4	Tahiti (TAH)	1	0	0	1
4	Tonga (TGA)	1	0	0	1
6	New Caledonia	0	2	0	2
6	Samoa (SAM)	0	2	0	2
8	Solomon Islands (SOL)	0	1	1	2
9	Guam (GUM)	0	0	2	2
Totals (9 entries)		6	6	6	18

== See also ==
- Asian Beach Volleyball Championships
- Beach volleyball at the Summer Olympics
