= Pacific Games =

Pacific archipelagic multi-sport event

- 1963; 1966; 1969; 1971; 1975; 1979; 1983; 1987; 1991; 1995; 1999; 2003; 2007; 2011; 2015; 2019; 2023

Pacific Games
- Abbreviation: PAG
- Purpose: Multi-sport event for nations in Oceania
- Frequency: Every 4 years
- Inaugurated: 1963
- Most recent: 2023 in Honiara, Solomon Islands
- Next event: 2027 in Tahiti, French Polynesia
- President: Vidhya Lakhan
- Headquarters: Suva, Fiji
- Website: Official website

The Pacific Games (French: Jeux du Pacifique), is a continental multi-sport event held every four years among athletes from Oceania. The inaugural Games took place in 1963 in Suva, Fiji, and most recently in 2023 in Honiara, Solomon Islands. The Games were called the South Pacific Games from 1963 to 2007. The Pacific Games Council (PGC) and the Oceania National Olympic Committees (ONOC) organise the Games and oversees the host city's preparations. Athletes with a disability are included as full members of their national teams. In each sporting event, gold medals are awarded for first place, silver medals are awarded for second place, and bronze medals are awarded for third place. Following the success of the Pacific Games, the PGC introduced a scaled-down version of the event, designed to allow smaller nations and territories to host and participate. This led to the establishment of the Pacific Mini Games.

Ten cities in seven countries and territories have hosted the Pacific Games. Four countries have hosted the games three times: Fiji (1963, 1979, 2003), New Caledonia (1966, 1987, 2011), Papua New Guinea (1969, 1991, 2015) and Samoa (1983, 2007, 2019). French Polynesia, who hosted in 1971 and 1995, will become the fifth country to host the Games for the third time in 2027. The United States territory of Guam have hosted the Games twice in 1975 and 1999. The Solomon Islands hosted the event for the first time in 2023.

Only six countries have attended every edition of the Pacific Games: Fiji, French Polynesia (Tahiti), New Caledonia, Papua New Guinea, Tonga, and Vanuatu. New Caledonia leads the all-time medal count for the Pacific Games, and has topped the medal table on 14 separate occasions—followed by the Papua New Guinea (two times), and Fiji (once).

== History ==
=== Concept ===
The concept of establishing the South Pacific Games was first proposed by Dr. A.H. Sahu Khan, a representative of Fiji at a 1959 South Pacific Commission (SPC) meeting held in Rabaul. The idea gained support, resulting in a gathering of nine territories in Nouméa in March 1961, where Fiji was chosen to host the inaugural Games.

=== Creation ===
In 1962, the SPC formed the South Pacific Games Council, which was later renamed the Pacific Games Council. The first Games were held in Suva, Fiji, in 1963 and have since been hosted by various nations and territories across the region. Initially held every three years, the schedule shifted after the 1969 Games in Port Moresby, with the next event staged in Tahiti in 1971, just two years later. From 1975, starting with the fifth Games in Tumon, Guam, the event moved to a four-year cycle.

Due to the lingering effects of European colonisation in the Pacific during the 18th century, many of the nations participating in the 1963 Games were still under British or French administration. This resulted in instances where British and French flags and national anthems were simultaneously used during ceremonies. At the time, Western Samoa (now Samoa) was the sole independent island nation, proudly using its own flag and anthem. As more territories gained independence, they introduced their own symbols of sovereignty. Despite these changes, English and French remain the official languages of the Games.

Like many sporting events, the South Pacific Games have faced occasional controversies. One ongoing debate is over scheduling events on Sundays, a day observed as the Christian Sabbath across much of the Pacific. In nations such as Tonga, where Sunday activities are strictly regulated, hosting events on that day has been controversial. Religious sensitivities have also influenced certain sports; for instance, the women's beach volleyball uniform of bikinis was replaced by more modest clothing in response to cultural expectations. However, other territories with ties to more secular nations, such as the Cook Islands (New Zealand), American Samoa (United States), and French Polynesia (France), have taken a more relaxed approach.

Global and regional political events have also impacted the Games. In 1995, when Papeete in Tahiti hosted the Games, several countries staged a boycott in protest of French nuclear testing in the Pacific. Almost all nations returned for the following Games in 1999 in Guam.

The Pacific Games Council states its primary aim is:

"To create bonds of kindred friendship and brotherhood amongst people of the countries of the Pacific region through sporting exchange without any distinctions as to race, religion or politics."

The Games were created to encourage the growth of sport across the South Pacific. The South Pacific Commission later adopted the name Pacific Community after five decades of existence.

=== Modern day games ===
The 2003 South Pacific Games in Suva, Fiji, marked the first time a comprehensive program of 32 sports was included. The schedule incorporated both traditional Pacific sports and those with limited regional participation.

For the 2003 event, an unprecedented level of corporate sponsorship allowed organizers greater flexibility in ensuring the Games' success. A vibrant publicity campaign generated public enthusiasm, while schools and youth organizations took part in initiatives such as the "adopt-a-country" program, also introduced for the first time.

The 2007 South Pacific Games in Apia, Samoa, were the thirteenth edition since 1963. Unlike the Olympic Games, which often produce economic benefits for the host nation, the 2007 Games left Samoa with an estimated US$92 million debt, largely due to extensive spending on infrastructure such as bridges and roads.

Despite financial concerns, five nations—Papua New Guinea, Vanuatu, Solomon Islands, Tonga, and American Samoa—submitted bids to host the 2015 Pacific Games. The event was eventually awarded to Port Moresby, Papua New Guinea, following the 2011 Pacific Games in Nouméa, New Caledonia. However, escalating costs—reportedly exceeding 1 billion AUD—and the logistical demands of organizing the Games continue to raise questions about the feasibility of hosting.

=== Renaming ===
At the Pacific Games Council General Assembly held in Apia in 2006, the event previously known as the South Pacific Games was officially renamed the Pacific Games. The organizing body also adopted the new name Pacific Games Council, replacing the South Pacific Games Council. The change took effect after the 2007 South Pacific Games, making that edition the last to use the old name and marking the transition to the new title in all subsequent events. The renaming aimed to modernize the Games' identity and align it with broader regional developments, including the Pacific Community's change of name from the South Pacific Commission to the Pacific Community in 1998. From the 2011 edition onwards, the new Pacific Games title and branding were used universally in all official materials and events.

== Sports ==
At the inaugural Pacific Games, ten sports were contested. Over time, the number of events increased, peaking at thirty-three sports during the 2007 edition, the highest to date. However, during the PGC Annual General Meeting (AGM) held in Port Vila in 2016, it was decided to cap the program at a maximum of 24 sports for all editions beginning with the 2023 Games, primarily due to cost considerations. As of December 2017, the Council had approved 36 sports for potential inclusion in the Games. As of 2025, sixteen of these sports are designated as core sports, which are mandatory at every edition of the Games from 2027 onwards. Triathlon was added as a core sport in 2016, with archery receiving the same designation in 2021. Sailing, which had been made a core sport in 2016, lost that status during the PGC AGM held in Koror on 6 July 2025. The remaining 20 sports are classified as optional and may be included at the discretion of the host nation's organizing committee. Discontinued sports include the rugby union 15s discipline, which was replaced by rugby sevens, and underwater fishing, which was last contested in 1999.

=== Current and discontinued program ===
The following sports (and disciplines) make up the current and discontinued Pacific Games official program and are listed alphabetically according to the name used by the PGC. Five of the 24 sports scheduled for the 2027 Pacific Games will consist of multiple disciplines. Each discipline is marked with a unique 3-character identifier code by the International Olympic Committee (IOC).

| Sport | Discipline | Code & Pictogram | Body | Years | Status |
|---|---|---|---|---|---|
| Archery | | ARC | World Archery | 1971–1975, 1995, 2003–2011, 2019–present | Core |
| Athletics | | ATH | World Athletics | 1963–present | Core |
| Badminton | | BDM | BWF | 2003–2011, 2019, 2027 | Optional |
| Baseball and softball | Baseball | BBL | WBSC (Note: The World Baseball Softball Confederation, which currently governs both baseball and softball, was created by a 2013 merger of two former governing bodies – the International Baseball Federation and the International Softball Federation. Baseball and softball were governed separately at all Pacific Games before 2013.) | 1999–2011 | Optional |
| Baseball and softball | Softball | SBL | WBSC | 1969–1975, 1991, 2007, 2015 | Optional |
| Baseball and softball | Baseball5 | BS5 | WBSC | Never | Optional |
| Basketball | 3x3 | BK3 | FIBA | 2019–present | Core |
| Basketball | Basketball | BKB | FIBA | 1963–present | Core |
| Bodybuilding | | BDB | WBPF | 1995, 2003–2015, 2023 | Optional |
| Boxing | | BOX | World Boxing (Note: AIBA/IBA was the recognised body of boxing until 2023.) | 1963–present | Core |
| Cricket | | CKT | ICC | 1979, 1987–1991, 2003–2019 | Optional |
| Cue sports | Billiards | BIL | WCBS | Never | Optional |
| Cue sports | Snooker | SNK | WCBS | Never | Optional |
| Cycling | BMX | BMX | UCI | Never | Optional |
| Cycling | Mountain bike | MTB | UCI | 2027 | Optional |
| Cycling | Road | CRD | UCI | 1966, 1971–1975, 1987, 1995, 2027 | Optional |
| Cycling | Track | CTR | UCI | 1966, 1971–1975, 1987, 1995 | Optional |
| Field hockey | Field hockey | HOC | FIH | 1979, 2003–2007 | Optional |
| Field hockey | Hockey5s | HO5 | FIH | 2015, 2023 | Optional |
| Football | | FBL | FIFA | 1963–1995, 2003–present | Core |
| Golf | | GLF | IGF | 1969–present | Core |
| Handball | | HBL | IHF | Never | Optional |
| Judo | | JUD | IJF | 1969–1979, 1987, 1995–2011, 2019–present | Core |
| Karate | | KTE | WKF | 1995–2003, 2011–2015, 2023 | Optional |
| Lawn bowls | | LBW | World Bowls | 1979, 1983, 1991, 2003–2007, 2015–2019 | Optional |
| Netball (Note: Netball is a women's competition only.) | | NTB | World Netball | 1963–1969, 1979–1983, 1991–2007, 2015–2023 | Optional |
| Outrigger canoeing | Va'a | VAA | IVF | 1995–present | Core |
| Outrigger canoeing | Kayak | KYK | IVF | 2023–present | Core |
| Powerlifting | | PLF | IPF | 1995, 2003–present | Optional |
| Rugby league nines | | RL9 | IRL | 2007, 2015–2023 | Optional |
| Rugby | Sevens | RU7 | World Rugby | 1999–present | Core |
| Sailing | | SAL | World Sailing | 1969–1979, 1987–present | Optional |
| Shooting | | SHO | ISSF | 1987, 1995, 2003–2019, 2027 | Optional |
| Squash | | SQU | WSF | 1979–1991, 2003–2019, 2027 | Optional |
| Surfing | | SRF | ISA | 1995, 2003–2011, 2027 | Optional |
| Swimming | | SWM | World Aquatics | 1963–1979, 1987–present | Core |
| Table tennis | | TTE | ITTF | 1963–present | Core |
| Taekwondo | | TKW | World Taekwondo | 1995–present | Core |
| Tennis | | TEN | ITF | 1963–present | Core |
| Touch rugby (Note: Touch rugby is an optional sport, however, all three events (men's, women's and mixed tournaments) must be included if the sport is scheduled on a games programme.) | | TRU | FIT | 2003–2007, 2015–2023 | Optional |
| Triathlon | | TRI | World Triathlon | 1995–present | Core |
| Volleyball | Beach | VBV | FIVB | 1999–present | Core |
| Volleyball | Indoor | VVO | FIVB | 1963–present | Core |
| Weightlifting | | WLF | IWF | 1966–present | Core |
| Wrestling | Freestyle | WRF | UWW | 1999, 2007, 2027 | Optional |
| Wrestling | Greco-Roman | WRG | UWW | 1999, 2007, 2027 | Optional |
| Wrestling | Beach | WRB | UWW | 2027 | Optional |
| Rugby | Union | RUG | World Rugby | 1963–1971, 1979–1995 | Discontinued |
| Underwater fishing | | FSH | CMAS | 1971–1975, 1995–1999 | Discontinued |

== Participating nations ==
Only six teams have attended every Pacific Games: Fiji, French Polynesia, New Caledonia, Papua New Guinea, Tonga and Vanuatu. This list includes all 22 current PGAs, two invitational teams as well as two obsolete PGAs, arranged alphabetically. The three-letter country code is also listed for each PGA. Several nations have changed during the Games' history; name changes are explained by footnotes after the nation's name, and other notes are explained by footnotes linked within the table.

| 63 | In the table headings, indicates the Games year |
| • | Participated in the specified Games |
| H | Host nation for the specified Games |
| ^{[a]} | Additional explanatory comments at the linked footnote |
| | Nation not a member of the Pacific Games Council during these years |
| | PGA superseded or preceded by other PGA(s) during these years |

| PGA | Code | 63 | 66 | 69 | 71 | 75 | 79 | 83 | 87 | 91 | 95 | 99 | 03 | 07 | 11 | 15 | 19 | 23 | Total |
|---|---|---|---|---|---|---|---|---|---|---|---|---|---|---|---|---|---|---|---|
| American Samoa | ASA | • | • | • | • | • | • | • | • | • | | • | • | • | • | • | • | • | 16 |
| Australia^{[a]} | AUS | | | | | | | | | | | | | | | • | • | • | 3 |
| Cook Islands | COK | • | • | | • | | • | • | • | • | • | • | • | • | • | • | • | • | 15 |
| Federated States of Micronesia | FSM | Trust Territory of Micronesia | | | | | | | | | | • | • | • | • | • | • | • | 7 |
| Fiji | FIJ | H | • | • | • | • | H | • | • | • | • | • | H | • | • | • | • | • | 17 |
| French Polynesia | PYF | • | • | • | H | • | • | • | • | • | H | • | • | • | • | • | • | • | 17 |
| Gilbert and Ellice Islands ^{[^]} | GEI | • | • | | • | | | | | | | | | | | | | | 3 |
| Guam | GUM | | • | • | • | H | • | • | • | • | • | H | • | • | • | • | • | • | 16 |
| Kiribati | KIR | Gilbert and Ellice Islands | | | | | • | | | | | • | • | • | • | • | • | • | 8 |
| Marshall Islands | MHL | Trust Territory of Micronesia | | | | | | | | | | • | • | • | • | • | • | • | 7 |
| (Trust Territory of the Pacific Islands) Trust Territory of Micronesia ^{[^]} | TTM | | | | | • | | | | | | | | | | | | | 1 |
| Nauru | NRU | • | • | • | • | • | • | | | • | | • | • | • | • | • | • | • | 14 |
| New Caledonia | NCL | • | H | • | • | • | • | • | H | • | • | • | • | • | H | • | • | • | 17 |
| New Zealand^{[b]} | NZL | | | | | | | | | | | | | | | • | • | • | 3 |
| Niue | NIU | • | | | | | • | • | | • | | • | • | • | • | • | • | • | 11 |
| Norfolk Island | NFK | | | | | | • | • | • | • | • | • | • | • | • | • | • | • | 12 |
| Northern Mariana Islands | NMI | Trust Territory of Micronesia | | | | | • | | • | • | • | • | • | • | • | • | • | • | 11 |
| Palau | PLW | Trust Territory of Micronesia | | | | | | | | | | • | • | • | • | • | • | • | 7 |
| Papua New Guinea | PNG | • | • | H | • | • | • | • | • | H | • | • | • | • | • | H | • | • | 17 |
| Samoa | SAM | • | • | • | • | • | • | H | | • | | • | • | H | • | • | H | • | 15 |
| Solomon Islands | SOL | • | • | • | • | • | • | • | | • | • | • | • | • | • | • | • | H | 16 |
| Tokelau | TKL | Gilbert and Ellice Islands | | | | | • | • | | | | | • | • | • | • | • | • | 8 |
| Tonga | TGA | • | • | • | • | • | • | • | • | • | • | • | • | • | • | • | • | • | 17 |
| Tuvalu | TUV | Gilbert and Ellice Islands | | | | | • | | | | | • | • | • | • | • | • | • | 8 |
| Vanuatu | VAN | • | • | • | • | • | • | • | • | • | • | • | • | • | • | • | • | • | 17 |
| Wallis and Futuna | WLF | | • | • | • | • | • | • | • | • | • | • | • | • | • | • | • | • | 16 |

Name change notes

PNG: Papua New Guinea participated under its former name of Papua and New Guinea (PNG) between 1963 and 1971.
SAM: Samoa participated under its former name of Western Samoa (WSM) between 1963 and 1995.
VAN: Vanuatu participated under its former name of New Hebrides (NHB) between 1963 and 1979.

Participation notes

1. ^[a]Australia is not a member of the PGC. It competes as invited.
2. ^[b]New Zealand is not a member of the PGC. It competes as invited.

== All-time medal table ==
Officially, the final medal tally of the Games does not recognize a winner, regarding competition and fair play more highly.

*Note : Nation(s) in italics no longer participate at the Pacific Games.

Updated after the 2023 Pacific Games.

| Rank | PGA / NOC | Gold | Silver | Bronze | Total |
|---|---|---|---|---|---|
| 1 | New Caledonia | 993 | 784 | 689 | 2,466 |
| 2 | Tahiti | 574 | 501 | 530 | 1,605 |
| 3 | Papua New Guinea | 499 | 488 | 475 | 1,462 |
| 4 | Fiji | 443 | 516 | 539 | 1,498 |
| 5 | Samoa^{[a]} | 266 | 216 | 220 | 702 |
| 6 | Nauru | 110 | 79 | 68 | 257 |
| 7 | Australia | 100 | 52 | 35 | 187 |
| 8 | Guam | 72 | 112 | 140 | 324 |
| 9 | Tonga | 60 | 74 | 113 | 247 |
| 10 | American Samoa | 45 | 51 | 84 | 180 |
| 11 | Cook Islands | 36 | 57 | 80 | 173 |
| 12 | Solomon Islands | 33 | 103 | 140 | 276 |
| 13 | Wallis and Futuna | 31 | 51 | 97 | 179 |
| 14 | Vanuatu^{[b]} | 29 | 65 | 110 | 204 |
| 15 | Federated States of Micronesia | 23 | 15 | 10 | 48 |
| 16 | New Zealand | 19 | 31 | 28 | 78 |
| 17 | Kiribati | 16 | 27 | 39 | 82 |
| 18 | Northern Mariana Islands | 13 | 13 | 18 | 44 |
| 19 | Palau | 9 | 14 | 16 | 39 |
| 20 | Norfolk Island | 7 | 15 | 19 | 41 |
| 21 | Marshall Islands | 5 | 6 | 14 | 25 |
| 22 | Tokelau | 3 | 2 | 2 | 7 |
| 23 | Tuvalu | 2 | 9 | 6 | 17 |
| 24 | Niue | 2 | 6 | 13 | 21 |
| 25 | Gilbert and Ellice Islands | 0 | 1 | 1 | 2 |
| Totals (25 entries) | | 3,390 | 3,288 | 3,486 | 10,164 |

- ^[a] Totals for Samoa include all medals won as Western Samoa
- ^[b] Totals for Vanuatu include all medals won as New Hebrides

== Editions ==
Host cities of the Pacific Games

=== List of Pacific Games ===
| Games | No. | Host | Games dates / Opened by | Sports | Competitors | Events | Nations | Top nation |
|---|---|---|---|---|---|---|---|---|
| 1963 | I | (Fiji) Suva | 29 August – 8 September 1963; Governor Sir Kenneth Maddocks | 10 | 646 | 58 | 13 | Fiji |
| 1966 | II | (New Caledonia) Nouméa | 8 – 18 December 1966; Overseas Minister Pierre Billotte | 12 | 1200 | 86 | 14 | New Caledonia |
| 1969 | III | (Territory of Papua and New Guinea) Port Moresby | 13 – 23 August 1969; Prince Edward, Duke of Kent | 15 | 1150 | 95 | 12 | New Caledonia |
| 1971 | IV | (French Polynesia) Papeʻetē | 25 August – 5 September 1971; Overseas Minister Pierre Messmer | 17 | 2000 | 117 | 14 | New Caledonia |
| 1975 | V | (Guam) Agaña | 1 – 10 August 1975; Governor Ricardo Bordallo | 16 | 1205 | 119 | 13 | New Caledonia |
| 1979 | VI | (Fiji) Suva | 28 August – 8 September 1979; Governor-General Ratu Sir George Cakobau | 18 | 2672 | 129 | 19 | New Caledonia |
| 1983 | VII | (Samoa) Apia | 5 – 16 September 1983; Head of State Malietoa Tanumafili II | 15 | 2500 | 97 | 13 | New Caledonia |
| 1987 | VIII | (New Caledonia) Nouméa | 8 – 20 December 1987; Unknown | 18 | 1650 | 159 | 12 | New Caledonia |
| 1991 | IX | (Papua New Guinea) Port Moresby and Lae | 7 – 21 September 1991; Prince Andrew, Duke of York | 17 | 2000 | 164 | 16 | Papua New Guinea |
| 1995 | X | (French Polynesia) Papeʻetē | 25 – 5 September 1995; Unknown | 25 | 2000 | 253 | 12 | New Caledonia |
| 1999 | XI | (Guam) Santa Rita | 29 May – 12 June 1999; Unknown | 22 | +3000 | 233 | 21 | New Caledonia |
| 2003 | XII | (Fiji) Suva | 28 June – 12 July 2003; President Josefa Iloilo | 32 | 5000 | 309 | 22 | New Caledonia |
| 2007 | XIII | (Samoa) Apia | 25 August – 8 September 2007; Head of State Tufuga Efi | 33 | 5000 | 305 | 22 | New Caledonia |
| 2011 | XIV | (New Caledonia) Nouméa | 27 August – 10 September 2011; French President Nicolas Sarkozy | 27 | 4300 | 305 | 22 | New Caledonia |
| 2015 | XV | (Papua New Guinea) Port Moresby | 4 – 18 July 2015; Prince Andrew, Duke of York | 28 | 3700 | 299 | 24 | Papua New Guinea |
| 2019 | XVI | (Samoa) Apia | 7 – 20 July 2019; Head of State Va'aletoa Sualauvi II | 26 | 4000 | 322 | 24 | New Caledonia |
| 2023 | XVII | (Solomon Islands) Honiara | 19 November – 2 December 2023; Prime Minister Manasseh Sogavare | 24 | 5000 | 342 | 24 | New Caledonia |
| 2027 | XVIII | (French Polynesia) Pīraʻe | 24 July – 7 August 2027; TBA | 24 | 4500 (expected) | 356 | 24 (expected) | TBD |
| 2031 | XIX | (Tonga) Nuku'alofa | TBA 2031; TBA | 24 | TBA | TBA | TBA | TBD |

== See also ==
- Pacific Mini Games
- Micronesian Games

Global Games

- Olympic Games – Worldwide participation, organized by the International Olympic Committee (IOC).
- World Games – Worldwide participation, focusing on non-Olympic sports.

Other continental Games

- African Games
- Asian Games
- European Games
- Pan American Games
  - South American Games

Community-based Games

- Commonwealth Games – For member countries and territories of the Commonwealth of Nations.
- Jeux de la Francophonie – For French-speaking countries and territories around the world.
- Lusofonia Games – For Portuguese–speaking countries and territories around the world.

== Sources ==
- Charter – Constitution adopted Apia, Samoa 14 May 2006 – Protocols and Regulations adopted by Executive Board on 17th January 2007 and 20th March 2007 (PDF 0.3 MB) (Report). Pacific Games Council. 2007. Archived from the original (PDF 0.3 MB) on 28 September 2007.
- Charter - Constitution, Code of Conduct, Protocols, and Regulations adopted Apia, Samoa 14 May 2006 - As amended most recently in Noumea, New Caledonia, 27 August 2010 (PDF 0.3 MB) (Report). Pacific Games Council. 2010.
- Charter - Constitution, Code of Conduct, Protocols, and Regulations adopted Apia, Samoa 14 May 2006 - As amended most recently in Wallis Island, 19 October 2012 (PDF 0.3 MB) (Report). Pacific Games Council. 2012.
- Charter - Constitution, Code of Conduct, Protocols, and Regulations adopted Apia, Samoa 14 May 2006 - As amended most recently in Port Moresby, Papua New Guinea, 4 July 2014 (PDF 0.3 MB) (Report). Pacific Games Council. 2014. Archived (PDF 0.3 MB) from the original on 4 March 2016.
- Charter - Constitution, Code of Conduct, Protocols, and Regulations adopted Apia, Samoa 14 May 2006 - As amended most recently in Port Vila, Vanuatu, 10 December 2017 (PDF 0.3 MB) (Report). Pacific Games Council. 2018. Archived (PDF 0.3 MB) from the original on 8 February 2018.
