= Outrigger canoeing at the 1995 South Pacific Games =

Outrigger Canoeing at the 1995 South Pacific Games
- Location: Tahiti

Outrigger canoeing at the 1995 South Pacific Games in Tahiti. Events were contested in the Va'a rudderless canoe. Tahiti dominated the competition winning all eight gold medals.

== Medal summary ==
=== Medal table ===
Rank	Nation	Gold	Silver	Bronze	Total
1	French Polynesia (TAH)	8	7	0	15
2	New Caledonia (NCL)	0	1	2	3
3	Wallis and Futuna (WLF)	0	0	3	3
4	Fiji (FIJ)	0	0	2	2
5	Cook Islands (COK)	0	0	1	1
Totals (5 entries)		8	8	8	24

=== Men's Results ===
Event	Gold		Silver		Bronze	
V1 500m	K. Maoni (TAH)	2:12.13	P. Vairaaroa (TAH)	2:14.92	A. Toafatavao (WLF)	2:19.40
V6 500m	Tahiti 2	1:47.77	Tahiti 1	1:49.56	Wallis and Futuna	1:49.80
V6 2500m	Tahiti 1	11:36.70	New Caledonia	11:44.51	Wallis and Futuna	11:54.41
V6 Marathon 30 km (time= hr:min:sec)	Tahiti 1	1:54:13	Tahiti 2	1:55:08	New Caledonia	2:02.41

=== Women's Results ===
Event	Gold		Silver		Bronze	
V1 500m	M. Tautu (TAH)	2:35.26	N. Montel (TAH)	2:36.98	M. Maono (NCL)	2:50.41
V6 500m	Tahiti 1	2:09.22	Tahiti 2	2:09.48	Fiji	2:11.89
V6 2500m	Tahiti 1	13:11.86	New Caledonia	13:35.22	Cook Islands	14:13.20
V6 Marathon 20 km (time= hr:min:sec)	Tahiti 2	1:38:27	Tahiti 1	1:45:27	Fiji	1:57.58

== Participating countries ==
Countries entered in the outrigger canoeing events at the 1995 Games included:

- Cook Islands
- Fiji
- New Caledonia
- Tahiti
- Wallis and Futuna
