= Va'a at the 2005 South Pacific Mini Games =

- Location: Koror
- Dates: 29 July-3 August

Va'a, also called the outrigger canoe, for the 2005 South Pacific Mini Games was held from 29 July to 3 August 2005 at Koror, Palau. Tahiti did not compete at this regatta, and New Caledonia topped the medal count.

== Medal summary ==
=== Medal table ===
Rank	Nation	Gold	Silver	Bronze	Total
1	New Caledonia (NCL)	5	1	0	6
2	Cook Islands (COK)	3	5	2	10
3	Samoa (SAM)	1	1	0	2
4	Fiji (FIJ)	1	0	5	6
5	Niue (NIU)	0	2	0	2
6	Palau (PLW)	0	1	2	3
7	Papua New Guinea (PNG)	0	0	1	1
Totals (7 entries)		10	10	10	30

=== Men's Results ===
Event	Gold		Silver		Bronze	
V1 500 m	Cook Islands	2:26.37	Niue	2:27.00	Fiji	2:28.35
V6 500 m	New Caledonia	1:56.46	Palau	1:57.68	Cook Islands	1:58.45
V6 1500 m	Cook Islands	6:42.31	New Caledonia	6:46.71	Palau	6:55.36
V1 15 km (time= h:min:s)	New Caledonia	1:15.42	Niue	1:23.02	Cook Islands	1:23.34
V6 30 km (time= h:min:s)	New Caledonia	2:06.50	Cook Islands	2:10.08	Palau	2:19.22

=== Women's Results ===
Event	Gold		Silver		Bronze	
V1 500 m	New Caledonia	2:50.65	Cook Islands	2:55.70	Fiji	3:01.20
V6 500 m	Fiji	2:18.90	Cook Islands	2:21.04	Papua New Guinea	2:21.99
V6 1500 m	Samoa	7:55.41	Cook Islands	8:01.62	Fiji	8:12.24
V1 10 km (time= h:min:s)	New Caledonia	59.30	Cook Islands	59.50	Fiji	1:05.19
V6 20 km (time= h:min:s)	Cook Islands	1:16.42	Samoa	1:18.12	Fiji	1:18.33
