= Outrigger canoeing at the 2003 South Pacific Games =

Outrigger Canoeing at the 2003 South Pacific Games
- Location: Suva

Outrigger canoeing at the 2003 South Pacific Games was held from 30 June to 3 July 2003 on the Suva foreshore in Fiji. Tahiti dominated the competition winning all twelve gold medals.

== Medal summary ==
=== Medal table ===
Rank	Nation	Gold	Silver	Bronze	Total
1	French Polynesia (TAH)	12	0	0	12
2	New Caledonia (NCL)	0	6	2	8
3	Fiji (FIJ)	0	5	2	7
4	Samoa (SAM)	0	1	2	3
5	Cook Islands (COK)	0	0	3	3
6	Wallis and Futuna (WLF)	0	0	2	2
7	Niue (NIU)	0	0	1	1
Totals (7 entries)		12	12	12	36

=== Men's results ===
Event	Gold		Silver		Bronze	
V1 500m	Karyl Maoni (TAH)	2:16.2	Georgy Taero (NCL)	2:22.2	Richard Denny (COK)	2:26.4
V6 500m	Tahiti	1:50.2	New Caledonia	1:52.9	Wallis and Futuna	1:53.8
V12 500m	Tahiti	1:47.1	New Caledonia	1:49.6	Wallis and Futuna	1:52.2
V6 2500 m	Tahiti	10:59.0	New Caledonia	11:17.6	Fiji	11:18.1
V1 15 km (time= hr:min:sec)	Georges Cronsteadt (TAH)	1:13:20	Wayne Houng Lee (FIJ)	1:18:39	Feneli Poimafit (NIU)	1:19:03
V6 30 km (time= hr:min:sec)	Tahiti	2:07:33	New Caledonia	2:13:47	Fiji	2:18:33

=== Women's results ===
Event	Gold		Silver		Bronze	
V1 500m	Evangelique Tehiva (TAH)	2:42.4	Rosemelle Terii (NCL)	2:52.5	Marie Allan (COK)	2:55.7
V6 500m	Tahiti	2:05.2	Fiji	2:10.7	Samoa	2:12.1
V12 500m	Tahiti	2:02.3	Fiji	2:08.3	Cook Islands	2:15.2
V6 2500 m	Tahiti	12:41.9	Fiji	12:47.1	Samoa	13:01.0
V1 10 km	Evangelique Tehiva (TAH)	1:06:38	Louisa Leqeta (FIJ)	1:09:47	Elodie Tavita (NCL)	1:12:38
V6 Marathon 20 km (time= hr:min:sec)	Tahiti	1:54:11	Samoa	1:57:05	New Caledonia	1:57:43
