= Badminton at the Pacific Games =

Badminton has been contested at the Pacific Games since 2003 when it was included as one of ten sports at the Eleventh South Pacific Games held in Suva, Fiji. Badminton was added to Pacific Mini Games for the seventh edition held at Saipan in 2022.

== Pacific Games ==
Flag icons and three letter country code indicate the nationality of the gold medal winner of an event, where this information is known; otherwise an (X) is used. Moving the cursor onto a country code with a dotted underline will reveal the name of the gold medal winner. A dash (–) indicates an event that was not contested.

Games	Year	Host city	Men's		Mixed		Women's		Total events	Refs
Games	Year	Host city	Singles	Doubles	Doubles	Team	Doubles	Singles	Total events	Refs
XII	2003	Suva	NCL	NCL	FIJ	FIJ	FIJ	FIJ	6	
XIII	2007	Apia	NCL	NCL	NCL	NCL	NCL	FIJ	6	
XIV	2011	Nouméa	NCL	NCL	NCL	NCL	NCL	FIJ	6	
XVI	2019	Apia	TAH	TAH	TAH	FIJ	NCL	NCL	6	

== Pacific Mini Games ==
Games	Year	Host city	Men's		Mixed		Women's		Total events	Refs
Games	Year	Host city	Singles	Doubles	Doubles	Team	Doubles	Singles	Total events	Refs
XI	2022	Saipan	X	X	X	X	X	X	6	

== See also ==
- Badminton at the Summer Olympics
