= Pacific Mini Games =

Sporting event

- Abbreviation: PMG
- Frequency: Every 4 years
- Inaugurated: 1981
- President: Vidhya Lakhan
- Headquarters: Suva, Fiji

The Pacific Mini Games are a continental multi-sport event contested by countries and territories located in Oceania. The event has been held every four years since the inaugural games in Honiara, Solomon Islands in 1981. It was known as the South Pacific Mini Games prior to 2009. It is called the 'Mini' games because it is a scaled-down version of the main Pacific Games and is similarly rotated on a four-year basis in the intervening years between the main Games.

The Mini Games have been hosted by 9 different Pacific Island capitals around 4 countries and 5 territories. The Cook Islands have hosted twice and is scheduled for a third in 2029. Vanuatu and Palau have also hosted two Games. Similarly to the main Games, athletes with a disability are included as full members of their national teams. In each sporting event, gold medals are awarded for first place, silver medals are awarded for second place, and bronze medals are awarded for third place.

Unlike the main Games, there is equal dominance from Pacific Games associations (PGA's). Papua New Guinea, New Caledonia, and Fiji have all ranked first a record 3 times, with Samoa, Nauru, and Tahiti topping the games once.

== Concept ==
Following the success of the main Pacific Games, the Pacific Games council decided to create a smaller version of the games to enable smaller nations and territories to host events and compete against each other. From this came the Pacific Mini Games.

== Pacific Games Council ==
The governing body for the mini games is the Pacific Games Council. Much like the main games, the Games council flag is presented to the host nation of the next mini games at the end of every games. As of 2017, the council has 22 member nations.

Two other nations, Australia and New Zealand, are not members of the council but are invited as observers to the council's general assembly. These nations participated at the mini games in 2017 and made their main games debut in 2015.

== Editions ==
Host cities of the Pacific Mini Games

=== List of Pacific Mini Games ===
| Games | No. | Host | Games dates / Opened by | Sports | Competitors | Events | Nations | Top nation |
|---|---|---|---|---|---|---|---|---|
| 1981 | I | (Solomon Islands) Honiara | 8 – 16 July 1981; Unknown | 5 | +600 | 51 | 15 | New Caledonia |
| 1985 | II | (Cook Islands) Rarotonga | 31 July – 9 August 1985; Unknown | 6 | 700 | 56 | 16 | Papua New Guinea |
| 1989 | III | (Tonga) Nuku'alofa | 22 August – 1 September 1989; King Tāufaʻāhau Tupou IV | 6 | 832 | 93 | 16 | Western Samoa |
| 1993 | IV | (Vanuatu) Port Vila | 6 – 16 December 1993; Unknown | 6 | | 67 | 15 | Fiji |
| 1997 | V | (American Samoa) Pago Pago | 11 – 22 August 1997; Unknown | 11 | 1798 | 144 | 19 | Nauru |
| 2001 | VI | (Norfolk Island) Kingston | 3 – 14 December 2001; Unknown | 10 | | 97 | 18 | Fiji |
| 2005 | VII | (Palau) Koror | 25 July – 4 August 2005; President Thomas Remengesau Jr. | 12 | | 170 | 20 | New Caledonia |
| 2009 | VIII | (Cook Islands) Rarotonga | 21 September – 2 October 2009; Queen's Rep Sir Frederick Goodwin | 15 | +1354 | 144 | 21 | Fiji |
| 2013 | IX | (Wallis and Futuna) Mata Utu | 2 – 12 September 2013; French President François Hollande | 8 | | 127 | 22 | Papua New Guinea |
| 2017 | X | (Vanuatu) Port Vila | 5 – 15 December 2017; President Tallis Obed Moses | 14 | ~2000 | 173 | 23+1 | New Caledonia |
| 2022 | XI | (Northern Mariana Islands) Saipan | 17 – 25 June 2022; Governor Ralph Torres | 9 | 1034 | 144 | 19 | Papua New Guinea |
| 2025 | XII | (Palau) Koror | 29 June – 9 July 2025; President Surangel Whipps Jr. | 12 | ~2000 | 236 | 23 | French Polynesia |
| 2029 | XIII | (Cook Islands) Rarotonga | TBA 2029; TBA | 12 | TBA | TBA | 24 (expected) | TBD |

As with the main games, the cost of providing the necessary facilities and infrastructure is a concern to the region's smaller nations. In preparation for the 2009 Games in Rarotonga, despite having hosted the games previously, the local government considered diverting funds from a highway project, and secured a loan for US$10 million from the Chinese government to finance the building of a stadium.

== Sports ==
There are 36 approved sports by the Pacific Games Council updated in 2025. Unlike the main games, the Pacific Mini Games does not have a compulsory sports list. However, 50 percent of the sports selected for a games must be from the compulsory sports list of the PGC. After the 2025 Games in Koror, 28 of the 36 sports have been included at the Mini Games since the inaugural edition in 1981.

Listed are sports already contested at the Pacific Mini Games.

| Sport | Discipline | Code & Pictogram | Body | Years | Status |
|---|---|---|---|---|---|
| Archery | | ARC | World Archery | 2001, 2017, 2025 | |
| Athletics | | ATH | World Athletics | 1981–present | |
| Badminton | | BDM | BWF | 2022 | |
| Baseball and softball | Baseball | BBL | WBSC (Note: The World Baseball Softball Confederation, which currently governs both baseball and softball, was created by a 2013 merger of two former governing bodies – the International Baseball Federation and the International Softball Federation. Baseball and softball were governed separately at all Pacific Games before 2013.) | 2005, 2022–present | |
| Baseball and softball | Softball | SBL | WBSC | 2005, 2025 | |
| Basketball | 3x3 | BK3 | FIBA | 2017, 2025 | |
| Basketball | Basketball | BKB | FIBA | 1997, 2005 | |
| Bodybuilding | | BDB | WBPF | 2001 | |
| Boxing | | BOX | World Boxing (Note: AIBA/IBA was the recognised body of boxing until 2023.) | 1981, 1989–1997, 2009, 2017 | |
| Football | | FBL | FIFA | 1981, 1993, 2017 | |
| Golf | | GLF | IGF | 1985–2001, 2009, 2017–2022 | |
| Judo | | JUD | IJF | 2017, 2025 | |
| Karate | | KTE | WKF | 2017 | |
| Lawn bowls | | LBW | World Bowls | 1985, 2001, 2009 | |
| Netball (Note: Netball is a women's competition only.) | | NTB | World Netball | 1981–2001, 2009, 2017 | |
| Outrigger canoeing | Va'a | VAA | IVF | 2005–2013, 2022–present | |
| Outrigger canoeing | Kayak | KYK | IVF | 2025 | |
| Powerlifting | | PLF | IPF | 1997 | |
| Rugby | Sevens | RU7 | World Rugby | 1997, 2009–2017 | |
| Sailing | | SAL | World Sailing | 1997, 2009–2013 | |
| Shooting | | SHO | ISSF | 2001 | |
| Squash | | SQU | WSF | 2001, 2009 | |
| Swimming | | SWM | World Aquatics | 2005, 2025 | |
| Table tennis | | TTE | ITTF | 2005–2009, 2017, 2025 | |
| Taekwondo | | TKW | World Taekwondo | 2013 | |
| Tennis | | TEN | ITF | 1981–2009, 2017–2022 | |
| Touch rugby (Note: Touch rugby is an optional sport, however, all three events (men's, women's and mixed tournaments) must be included if the sport is scheduled on a games programme.) | | TRU | FIT | 2009 | |
| Triathlon | | TRI | World Triathlon | 2001–2009, 2022–present | |
| Volleyball | Beach | VBV | FIVB | 2005, 2013–present | |
| Volleyball | Indoor | VVO | FIVB | 1997, 2013, 2025 | |
| Weightlifting | | WLF | IWF | 1989, 1997, 2005–present | |
| Wrestling | Freestyle | WRF | UWW | 2005, 2025 | |
| Wrestling | Greco-Roman | WRG | UWW | 2005, 2025 | |
| Wrestling | Beach | WRB | UWW | 2025 | |
| Rugby | Union | RUG | World Rugby | 1985 | Discontinued |
| Rugby league | Sevens | RL7 | IRL | 2009 | Discontinued |

== Participating nations ==
Only ten teams have attended every Pacific Mini Games: American Samoa, Cook Islands, Fiji, New Caledonia, Norfolk Island, Papua New Guinea, Samoa, Solomon Islands, Tonga, and Vanuatu. This list includes all 22 current PGAs and the two invitational teams, arranged alphabetically. The three-letter country code is also listed for each PGA. Country name changes are explained by footnotes after the nation's name, and other notes are explained by footnotes linked within the table.

=== Other entries ===
- IPA. Athletes from Tahiti competed as Independent Athletes in 2017. No official Tahiti team took part in the 2017 Mini Games following the French Polynesian government's decision to boycott the event. A number of Tahitian athletes competed under the banner of the Pacific Games Council.

=== Table legend ===
| 81 | In the table headings, indicates the Games year |
| • | Participated in the specified Games |
| H | Host nation for the specified Games |
| ^{[a]} | Additional explanatory comments at the linked footnote |
| | Nation not a member of the Pacific Games Council during these years |
| | PGA superseded or preceded by other PGA(s) during these years |

| PGA | Code | 81 | 85 | 89 | 93 | 97 | 01 | 05 | 09 | 13 | 17 | 22 | 25 | Total |
|---|---|---|---|---|---|---|---|---|---|---|---|---|---|---|
| American Samoa | ASA | • | • | • | • | H | • | • | • | • | • | • | • | 12 |
| Australia^{[a]} | AUS | | | | | | | | | | • | • | • | 3 |
| Cook Islands | COK | • | H | • | • | • | • | • | H | • | • | • | • | 12 |
| Federated States of Micronesia | FSM | | | | | • | • | • | • | • | • | • | • | 8 |
| Fiji | FIJ | • | • | • | • | • | • | • | • | • | • | • | • | 12 |
| French Polynesia | PYF | • | • | • | • | • | • | | • | • | | • | • | 10 |
| Guam | GUM | • | | • | • | • | • | • | • | • | • | • | • | 11 |
| Kiribati | KIR | • | • | | | • | • | • | • | • | • | • | • | 10 |
| Marshall Islands | MHL | | • | | | | | • | | • | • | | • | 5 |
| Nauru | NRU | | • | • | • | • | • | • | • | • | • | • | • | 11 |
| New Caledonia | NCL | • | • | • | • | • | • | • | • | • | • | • | • | 12 |
| New Zealand^{[b]} | NZL | | | | | | | | | | • | | • | 2 |
| Niue | NIU | | • | • | • | • | • | • | • | • | • | | | 9 |
| Norfolk Island | NFK | • | • | • | • | • | H | • | • | • | • | • | • | 12 |
| Northern Mariana Islands | NMI | • | | • | • | • | • | • | • | • | • | H | • | 11 |
| Palau | PLW | | | | | • | • | H | • | • | • | • | H | 8 |
| Papua New Guinea | PNG | • | • | • | • | • | • | • | • | • | • | • | • | 12 |
| Samoa | SAM | • | • | • | • | • | • | • | • | • | • | • | • | 12 |
| Solomon Islands | SOL | H | • | • | • | • | • | • | • | • | • | • | • | 12 |
| Tokelau | TKL | | | | | | | | • | • | • | | • | 4 |
| Tonga | TGA | • | • | H | • | • | • | • | • | • | • | • | • | 12 |
| Tuvalu | TUV | | | | | | | • | • | • | • | • | • | 6 |
| Vanuatu | VAN | • | • | • | H | • | • | • | • | • | H | • | • | 12 |
| Wallis and Futuna | WLF | • | • | • | | • | | • | • | H | • | • | • | 10 |
| Other entries | Code | 81 | 85 | 89 | 93 | 97 | 01 | 05 | 09 | 13 | 17 | 22 | 25 | Total |
| Independent PGC Athletes ^{[^]} | IPA | | | | | | | | | | | | | 1 |

Name change notes

SAM: Samoa participated under its former name of Western Samoa (WSM) between 1981 and 1997.

Participation notes

1. ^[a]Australia are not a member of the PGC. They compete as invites.
2. ^[b]New Zealand are not a member of the PGC. They compete as invites.

== All-time medal table ==
This table shows all medals won by a Pacific Games association since the inaugural games in 1981 to the most recent games held in 2025.

| Rank | Nation | Gold | Silver | Bronze | Total |
|---|---|---|---|---|---|
| 1 | New Caledonia | 255 | 204 | 162 | 621 |
| 2 | French Polynesia | 223 | 150 | 134 | 507 |
| 3 | Fiji | 216 | 208 | 202 | 626 |
| 4 | Papua New Guinea | 204 | 216 | 189 | 609 |
| 5 | Samoa | 160 | 94 | 108 | 362 |
| 6 | Nauru | 69 | 47 | 41 | 157 |
| 7 | Vanuatu | 45 | 64 | 64 | 173 |
| 8 | Cook Islands | 42 | 52 | 57 | 151 |
| 9 | Australia | 40 | 19 | 20 | 79 |
| 10 | Tonga | 36 | 49 | 81 | 166 |
| 11 | American Samoa | 33 | 37 | 26 | 96 |
| 12 | Northern Mariana Islands | 30 | 33 | 31 | 94 |
| 13 | Solomon Islands | 29 | 79 | 66 | 174 |
| 14 | Kiribati | 26 | 12 | 20 | 58 |
| 15 | Guam | 23 | 28 | 41 | 92 |
| 16 | Palau | 17 | 18 | 25 | 60 |
| 17 | Wallis and Futuna | 13 | 29 | 36 | 78 |
| 18 | Federated States of Micronesia | 12 | 8 | 8 | 28 |
| 19 | Marshall Islands | 10 | 7 | 6 | 23 |
| 20 | Norfolk Island | 7 | 17 | 14 | 38 |
| 21 | New Zealand | 4 | 10 | 4 | 18 |
| 22 | Tuvalu | 3 | 3 | 13 | 19 |
| 23 | Niue | 2 | 14 | 7 | 23 |
| – | Independent PGC athletes | 2 | 1 | 0 | 3 |
| 24 | Tokelau | 0 | 2 | 2 | 4 |
| Totals (24 entries) | | 1,501 | 1,401 | 1,357 | 4,259 |

== See also ==
- Pacific Games

== Sources ==
- Charter – Constitution adopted Apia, Samoa 14 May 2006 – Protocols and Regulations adopted by Executive Board on 17th January 2007 and 20th March 2007 (PDF) (Report). Pacific Games Council. 2007. Archived from the original (PDF 0.3 MB) on 28 September 2007.
