= Cycling at the 2003 South Pacific Games =

Cycling at the 2003 South Pacific Games was held from 3–5 July 2003 on the Suva foreshore in Fiji. Three women's road cycling events were contested, with New Caledonia winning two gold medals and Tahiti winning one.

== Teams ==
The five nations competing were:

- Fiji
- New Caledonia
- Northern Mariana Islands
- Palau
- (French Polynesia) Tahiti

== Medal summary ==
=== Medal table ===
Rank	Nation	Gold	Silver	Bronze	Total
1	New Caledonia (NCL)	2	2	1	5
2	Tahiti (TAH)	1	0	1	2
3	Palau (PLW)	0	1	1	2
Totals (3 entries)		3	3	3	9

=== Women's results ===
Event	Gold		Silver		Bronze		Ref
20 km Individual time trial	Isabella Boyer-Molin (NCL)	33:26	Judith Lemesle-Benebig (NCL)	34:03	Amy Zirneklis (PLW)	34:17	
60 km Road race	Isabella Boyer-Moulin (NCL)	1:32:03	Judith Lemesle-Benebig (NCL)	1:32:04	Kylie Vernaudon (TAH)	1:34:46	
10 km Criterium	Kylie Vernaudon (TAH)	17:48.02	Amy Zirneklis (PLW)	17:48.34	Isabella Boyer-Molin (NCL)	17:49.09	
