= 1993 South Pacific Mini Games =

1993 Pacific Mini Games
- Host city: Port Vila
- Country: Vanuatu
- Nations: 15
- Events: 6 sports
- Opening: December 6, 1993
- Closing: December 16, 1993

The 1993 South Pacific Mini Games were held at Port Vila in Vanuatu from 6–16 December 1993. It was the fourth edition of the South Pacific Mini Games.

== Participating countries ==
Fifteen Pacific nations participated in the Games:

- American Samoa
- Cook Islands
- Fiji
- French Polynesia, "Tahiti"
- Guam
- Nauru
- New Caledonia
- Niue
- Norfolk Island
- Northern Marianas
- Papua New Guinea
- Solomon Islands
- Tonga
- Vanuatu
- Western Samoa
Note: A number in parentheses indicate the size of a country's team (where known).

== Sports ==
The six sports contested at the 1993 South Pacific Mini Games were:

- Athletics (42)
- Boxing (12)
- Football (1)
- Golf (4)
- Netball (1)
- Tennis (7)
Note: A number in parentheses indicates how many medal events were contested in that sport (where known).

== Final medal table ==
Fiji topped the medal count:

Rank	Nation	Gold	Silver	Bronze	Total
1	Fiji (FIJ)	16	19	21	56
2	New Caledonia (NCL)	16	13	11	40
3	French Polynesia (TAH)	14	7	9	30
4	Papua New Guinea (PNG)	6	13	18	37
5	Vanuatu (VAN)	5	3	4	12
6	Tonga (TON)	4	4	4	12
7	Samoa (SAM)	3	1	5	9
8	Solomon Islands (SOL)	2	3	4	9
9	Cook Islands (COK)	1	0	0	1
10	American Samoa (ASA)	0	2	1	3
11	Guam (GUM)	0	1	0	1
11	Norfolk Island (NFK)	0	1	0	1
13	Nauru (NRU)	0	0	0	0
13	Niue (NIU)	0	0	0	0
13	Northern Mariana Islands (MNP)	0	0	0	0
Totals (15 entries)		67	67	77	211

== See also ==
- Athletics at the 1993 South Pacific Mini Games
