= 1989 South Pacific Mini Games =

1989 Pacific Mini Games
- Host city: Nuku'alofa
- Country: Tonga
- Nations: 16
- Athletes: 832
- Opening: August 22, 1989
- Closing: September 1, 1989
- Opened by: King Taufa’ahau Tepou IV
- Main venue: Teufaiva Sport Stadium

The 1989 South Pacific Mini Games were held at Nuku'alofa in Tonga from 22 August to 1 September 1989. It was the third edition of the South Pacific Mini Games.

Tonga's national stadium, the Teufaiva Sport Stadium, was built for the Games on the previous site of the agricultural showgrounds. The stadium, new Atele gymnasium, and tennis courts, were built or refurbished with the aid of Taiwan and France. The venues were eventually completed just in time for the games following some controversy in the preceding months with the construction alarmingly behind schedule.

== Participating countries ==
Sixteen Pacific nations participated in the Games:

- American Samoa
- Cook Islands
- Fiji
- French Polynesia, "Tahiti"
- Guam
- Nauru
- New Caledonia
- Niue
- Norfolk Island
- Northern Marianas
- Papua New Guinea
- Solomon Islands
- Tonga
- Vanuatu
- Wallis and Futuna
- Western Samoa
Note: A number in parentheses indicate the size of a country's team (where known).

== Sports ==
The six sports contested at the 1989 South Pacific Mini Games were:

- Athletics (40)
- Boxing (12) ^{a}
- Golf (4) ^{b}
- Netball (1) ^{c}
- Tennis (5)
- Weightlifting ^{d}
Note: A number in parentheses indicates how many medal events were contested in that sport (where known).

== Final medal table ==
Western Samoa topped the medal count:

Rank	Nation	Gold	Silver	Bronze	Total
1	Western Samoa (WSM)	27	6	3	36
2	French Polynesia (PYF)	20	20	20	60
3	New Caledonia (NCL)	15	17	15	47
4	Papua New Guinea (PNG)	14	17	15	46
5	Fiji (FIJ)	5	7	12	24
6	Nauru (NRU)	3	0	0	3
7	Tonga (TON)	2	13	13	28
8	American Samoa (ASA)	2	5	10	17
9	Cook Islands (COK)	2	2	2	6
10	Guam (GUM)	1	1	4	6
11	Vanuatu (VAN)	1	0	2	3
12	Norfolk Island (NFK)	1	0	0	1
13	Solomon Islands (SOL)	0	4	3	7
14	Niue (NIU)	0	0	0	0
14	Northern Mariana Islands (MNP)	0	0	0	0
14	Wallis and Futuna (WLF)	0	0	0	0
Totals (16 entries)		93	92	99	284

== See also ==
- Athletics at the 1989 South Pacific Mini Games

== Notes ==
^a Western Samoa won six gold medals in the boxing competition that captured the local people's imagination – as reported by Pacific islands Monthly, "it seemed half of Nuku'alof was crammed into the indoor stadium".

^b Golf: Fiji, captained by Adi Sainimili Tuivanuavou, won the women's team bronze at the 1989 South Pacific Mini Games.

^c Netball: Cook Islands won the competition, defeating PNG by 53–49 in the final. Fiji did not play in the tournament.

^d Nauru's 18-year-old Marcus Stephens broke all three South Pacific Games records in the 60 kg weightlifting class.

== Sources ==
- "Reflections on a mini event". Pacific Islands Monthly. Vol. 59, no. 21. 1989. pp. 48–49.
