= 1975 South Pacific Games =

5th edition of the South Pacific Games, held in Guam

- Host city: Tamuning
- Country: Guam
- Nations: 13
- Athletes: 1,205
- Events: 16 sports
- Opening: August 1, 1975
- Closing: August 10, 1975
- Opened by: Ricardo Bordallo

The 5th South Pacific Games, also known as Guam 1975 (Chamorro: Guåhån 1975), held in Tamuning and Hagåtña, Guam from 1 to 10 August 1975, was the fifth edition of the South Pacific Games. A total of 1,205 athletes (907 men and 298 women) participated in a rain-affected games which had only one clear day out of the ten scheduled.

The hosting of the event, originally planned for 1974, had met trouble from the start. Carlos Camacho, the Governor of Guam, had been opposed to spending any government money on the games. The impasse was broken in late 1973 and the games were rescheduled for 1975. However, preparations for the events did not progress smoothly, and visiting teams were disappointed with the condition of some of the venues and the scheduling in the middle of the rainy season. The games went ahead despite the logistical problems. Sixteen South Pacific Games records were broken in the track and field athletics events alone.

Guam's basketball gold medal win by the men's team captained by Tony Susuico was the highlight of the Games for the hosting country.

== Participating countries ==
Thirteen Pacific nations or territories competed at the Games:

- American Samoa (50) ^{a}
- Fiji
- French Polynesia
- Guam
- Nauru
- New Caledonia
- New Hebrides (55) ^{a}
- Papua New Guinea (290) ^{a}
- Solomon Islands
- Tonga
- Trust Territory of Micronesia (97) ^{b}
- Wallis and Futuna
- Western Samoa
Note: A number in parentheses indicates the size of a country's team (where known).

== Sports ==
There were 16 sports contested at the 1975 South Pacific Games:

- Archery (2)
- Athletics (35)
- Basketball (2)
- Boxing (11)
- Cycling (6)
- Football (1)
- Golf (4)
- Judo (6)
- Sailing (1)
- Softball (2)
- Swimming (21)
- Table tennis (7)
- Tennis (5)
- Underwater fishing (2)
- Volleyball (2)
- Weightlifting (9) ^{c}
Note: A number in parentheses indicates how many medal events were contested in that sport (where known).

== Medal table ==
New Caledonia topped the (unofficial) medal count.

* Host nation (Guam (host))

Rank	Nation	Gold	Silver	Bronze	Total
1	New Caledonia	37	31	34	102
2	French Polynesia	27	28	39	94
3	Papua New Guinea	22	25	18	65
4	Fiji	13	13	11	37
5	Western Samoa	9	4	5	18
6	Guam*	3	5	5	13
7	American Samoa	3	4	5	12
8	Tonga	2	1	1	4
9	New Hebrides	1	3	4	8
10	Wallis and Futuna	1	2	8	11
11	Solomon Islands	1	2	3	6
12	Trust Territory of Micronesia	0	2	0	2
13	Nauru	0	0	1	1
Totals (13 entries)		119	120	134	373

Source: PIM ^{d}

== Notes ==
^a Team sizes were reported before the Games for several countries including: American Samoa, New Hebrides, and Papua New Guinea.

^b Micronesia sent 97 athletes, with participants in athletics, basketball, boxing, golf, weightlifting, softball, swimming, table tennis, tennis, underwater fishing, and volleyball.

^c Weightlifting: medals were awarded only for total lift in each weight class.

^d The medal table as reported in Pacific Islands Monthly at the conclusion of the Games is used as the source here. An incomplete medal tally was published on the official Pacific Games Council webpage (as at May 2015). That tally did not include medals won by Tonga, Solomon Islands, Nauru, or the Trust Territory of Micronesia, but did list medals as being won by Cook Islands who did not attend the Games in 1975.

== Sources ==
- 1975 South Pacific Games Results. Oceania Sport Information Centre (Report). Archived from the original on 31 October 2015.
