= 1983 South Pacific Games =

7th edition of the South Pacific Games

- Host city: Apia
- Country: Western Samoa
- Nations: 15
- Athletes: 2,500+ ^{a}
- Events: 13 sports
- Opening: September 5, 1983
- Closing: September 16, 1983
- Opened by: Malietoa Tanumafili II

The 7th South Pacific Games (Samoan: Taʻaloga Lona-Fitu a le Pasefika i Saute), also known as Apia 1983, held on 5–16 September 1983 in Apia, Western Samoa, was the seventh edition of the South Pacific Games.

== Participating countries ==
Fifteen nations competed at the 1983 South Pacific Games:

- American Samoa
- Cook Islands
- Fiji
- French Polynesia
- Guam
- New Caledonia
- Niue ^{b}
- Norfolk Island
- Papua New Guinea
- Solomon Islands
- (New Zealand) Tokelau ^{c}
- Tonga
- Vanuatu
- Wallis and Futuna
- Western Samoa

== Sports ==
Despite swimming being a compulsory sport for the South Pacific Games, there was no facility built in Apia to host swimming events in 1983. There were thirteen sports contested at the 1983 South Pacific Games:

- Athletics (38) ^{d}
- Basketball (2) ^{e}
- Bowls (8) ^{f}
- Boxing (12) ^{d}
- Football (1) ^{d}
- Golf (4) ^{d}
- Netball (1) ^{g}
- Rugby union (1) ^{c}
- Squash (4) ^{f}
- Table tennis (7)
- Tennis (7) ^{d}
- Volleyball (2) ^{i}
- Weightlifting (10) ^{d}
Note: A number in parentheses indicates how many medal events were contested in that sport (where known).

== Medal table ==
New Caledonia topped the table ahead of hosts Western Samoa:

| Rank | Nation | Gold | Silver | Bronze | Total |
|---|---|---|---|---|---|
| 1 | New Caledonia (NCL) | 24 | 20 | 19 | 63 |
| 2 | Western Samoa (WSM) | 20 | 13 | 12 | 45 |
| 3 | French Polynesia (PYF) | 13 | 17 | 14 | 44 |
| 4 | Fiji (FIJ) | 12 | 17 | 14 | 43 |
| 4 | Papua New Guinea (PNG) | 12 | 17 | 14 | 43 |
| 6 | American Samoa (ASA) | 4 | 4 | 6 | 14 |
| 7 | Cook Islands (COK) | 3 | 4 | 0 | 7 |
| 8 | Guam (GUM) | 3 | 2 | 1 | 6 |
| 9 | Norfolk Island (NFI) | 2 | 0 | 1 | 3 |
| 10 | Wallis and Futuna (WLF) | 1 | 2 | 5 | 8 |
| 11 | Solomon Islands (SOL) | 1 | 1 | 2 | 4 |
| 12 | Vanuatu (VAN) | 1 | 0 | 9 | 10 |
| 13 | Tonga (TON) | 1 | 0 | 5 | 6 |
| 14 | Niue (NIU) | 0 | 0 | 0 | 0 |
| 14 | Tokelau (TKL) | 0 | 0 | 0 | 0 |
| Totals (15 entries) | | 97 | 97 | 102 | 296 |

== See also ==
- Athletics at the 1983 South Pacific Games
- Football at the 1983 South Pacific Games

== Notes ==
^a Attempts to reduce the size the games were not successful and more than 2,500 athletes took part in 1983.

^b Niue competed in the soccer and rugby competitions.

^c Tokelau competed in the rugby competition.

^d Postage stamps depicting athletics, netball, tennis, weightlifting, boxing, soccer, golf and rugby were issued by Samoa for the 1983 South Pacific Games.

^e Fiji's women's basketball team won gold in 1983.

^f Bowls: Fiji won gold in the women's pairs at Apia in 1983.

^g Cook Islands won the netball gold in 1983.

^h The South Pacific Games Council announced in 1978 that squash would be included in the Games, and it was played in 1979, 1983, 1987, and 1991. There were four gold medals on offer in 1983, for men's and women's individual and team events. The men's individual event won by Fiji's Willie Valentine, and the women's team event won by PNG. Fiji won silver in both men's and women's team events.

^i Women's volleyball was played at the 1983 South Pacific Games.

== Sources ==
- 1983 South Pacific Games Results. Oceania Sport Information Centre (Report). Archived from the original on 8 September 2017.
