= 1987 South Pacific Games =

8th edition of the South Pacific Games

- Host city: Nouméa
- Country: New Caledonia
- Nations: 12
- Athletes: 1,650 ^{*}
- Events: 18 sports^{a}
- Opening: December 8, 1987
- Closing: December 20, 1987

The 8th South Pacific Games (French: 8e Jeux du Pacifique sud), also known as Nouméa 1987, held on 8–20 December 1987 in Nouméa, New Caledonia, was the eighth edition of the South Pacific Games. Political events of the time affected the Games in 1987 and the number of competitors were down. Fiji had two military coups in 1987, and within New Caledonia itself, the Games became a focus of protest in the Kanak independence struggle. The French territories of New Caledonia and French Polynesia had the largest teams and dominated the medal count, with Papua New Guinea finishing third ahead of a depleted Fijian team.

== Participating countries ==
Twelve Pacific nations participated in the Games:

- American Samoa
- Cook Islands
- Fiji
- French Polynesia
- Guam
- New Caledonia
- Norfolk Island
- Northern Mariana Islands
- Papua New Guinea
- Tonga
- Vanuatu
- Wallis and Futuna

== Sports ==
There were 18 sports contested at the 1987 South Pacific Games:^{a}

- Athletics (38) ^{b}
- Basketball (2)
- Boxing (11)
- Cricket (1)
- Cycling (6)
- Football (1) ^{c}
- Golf (4) ^{b}
- Judo (9)
- Rugby union (1) ^{d}
- Sailing (8)
- Shooting (9)
- Squash (4) ^{e}
- Swimming (25)
- Table tennis (6)
- Tennis (7)
- Underwater fishing (2)
- Volleyball (2)
- Weightlifting (10)
Note: A number in parentheses indicates how many medal events were contested in that sport (where known).

== Medal table ==
Medals were awarded in a total of 164 events:

Rank	Nation	Gold	Silver	Bronze	Total
1	New Caledonia	82	48	38	168
2	French Polynesia	35	38	43	116
3	Papua New Guinea	15	27	27	69
4	Fiji	9	14	15	38
5	American Samoa	9	5	5	19
6	Tonga	3	3	6	12
6	Wallis and Futuna	3	3	6	12
8	Northern Mariana Islands	2	3	1	6
9	Guam	1	8	13	22
10	Cook Islands	0	3	1	4
11	Norfolk Island	0	2	3	5
12	Vanuatu^{c}	0	0	0	0
Totals (12 entries)		159	154	158	471

== See also ==
- Athletics at the 1987 South Pacific Games
- Football at the 1987 South Pacific Games

== Notes ==
^* A total of 1,650 athletes from 12 Pacific nations and territories took part in the Games. The Solomon Islands and Western Samoa did not attend.

^a The results published on the OSIC (Oceania Sport Information Centre) website listed 18 sports. Islands Business reported that there was no netball at the 1987 Games:

^b Postage stamps depicting athletics, rugby and golf were issued by New Caledonia for the 1987 South Pacific Games.

^c Football finals: New Caledonia 1-0 Tahiti in the gold medal match. Papua New Guinea 3-1 Vanuatu in the bronze medal match.

^d Rugby: New Caledonia won the rugby 15s gold medal Referee Patrick Robin FFR. Michael Agnew PNGRFU refereed Tests between Cook Islands and Samoa and New Caledonia and French Polynesia.

^e The South Pacific Games Council announced in 1978 that squash would be included in the Games, and it was played in 1979, 1983, 1987, and 1991.

== Sources ==
- 1987 South Pacific Games Results. Oceania Sport Information Centre (Report). Archived from the original on 30 October 2015.
