= 1999 South Pacific Games =

11th edition of the South Pacific Games

- Host city: Santa Rita
- Country: Guam
- Nations: 21
- Athletes: 3,000+^{*}
- Events: 22 sports
- Opening: May 29, 1999
- Closing: June 12, 1999

The 11th South Pacific Games, also known as Guam 1999 (Chamorro: Guåhån 1999), held in Santa Rita and Hagåtña, Guam from 29 May to 12 June 1999, was the eleventh edition of the South Pacific Games.

== Participating countries ==
The 21 countries that competed at the 1999 South Pacific Games were:

- American Samoa
- Cook Islands
- Fiji
- French Polynesia
- Guam
- Kiribati
- Marshall Islands
- Micronesia
- Nauru
- New Caledonia
- Niue
- Norfolk Island
- Northern Marianas
- Palau
- Papua New Guinea
- Solomon Islands
- Tonga
- Tuvalu
- Vanuatu
- Wallis and Futuna
- Western Samoa
Note: A number in parentheses indicate the size of a country's team (where known).

== Sports ==
There were 22 medal sports contested:^{a}^{,}^{b}

- Athletics (45)
- Baseball (1)
- Basketball (2)
- Beach volleyball (2) ^{c}
- Boxing (12)
- Golf (4)
- Judo (6)
- Karate (13)
- Netball (1)
- Outrigger canoeing (10) ^{d}
- Rugby sevens (1)
- Sailing (10)
- Softball (3)
- Swimming (34) ^{e}
- Table tennis (7)
- Taekwondo (11)
- Tennis (7)
- Triathlon (3)
- Underwater fishing (2)
- Volleyball (2)
- Weightlifting (45)
- Wrestling (16)
Note: A number in parentheses indicates how many medal events were contested in that sport.

== Medal table ==
New Caledonia topped the medal count.

Rank	Nation	Gold	Silver	Bronze	Total
1	New Caledonia (NCL)	72	54	44	170
2	Fiji (FIJ)	33	32	37	102
3	Nauru (NRU)	27	8	7	42
4	French Polynesia (PYF)	25	18	34	77
5	Papua New Guinea (PNG)	19	31	34	84
6	Western Samoa (WSM)	19	9	4	32
7	Guam (GUM)	14	32	26	72
8	American Samoa (ASA)	7	3	5	15
9	Federated States of Micronesia (FSM)	4	2	6	12
10	Solomon Islands (SOL)	3	6	12	21
11	Wallis and Futuna (WLF)	3	6	11	20
12	Vanuatu (VAN)	2	8	12	22
13	Northern Mariana Islands (MNP)	2	6	8	16
14	Tonga (TON)	2	3	10	15
15	Norfolk Island (NFK)	1	0	1	2
16	Palau (PLW)	0	7	3	10
17	Kiribati (KIR)	0	3	3	6
18	Marshall Islands (MHL)	0	2	5	7
19	Cook Islands (COK)	0	1	0	1
20	Niue (NIU)	0	0	0	0
20	Tuvalu (TUV)	0	0	0	0
Totals (21 entries)		233	231	262	726

== Notes ==
^* Congressman Robert A. Underwood stated that more than 3,000 athletes were welcomed for the 1999 SPG.

^a Congressman Underwood recorded 26 sporting events, but the results for wrestling listed the freestyle and Greco-Roman medals separately and the results for weightlifting listed the clean and jerk, snatch, and overall medals separately. The football tournament was not held because newly imposed OFC/FIFA regulations on player registrations conflicted with the South Pacific Games system and the tournament was not sanctioned. The official site listed 22 sports.

^b The Guam Bodybuilding website reported Ricky Collins as winning gold in the heavyweight division for bodybuilding at 1999 South Pacific Games, but this may not have been an official event in the 1999 Games. The sport is not included in the list above as it was not mentioned on SPG 1999 website.

^c Solomon Islands beach volleyball team's first appearance was in the 1999 Guam South Pacific Games.

^d Six events for the "Galaide II", OC6 canoe (G6). Four events for the Va'a 1, rudderless OC1 (V1). Held at Matapang Beach, Tumon Bay.

^e Swimming: Three were 34 medal events contested, 17 each for men and women. The 5 kilometre open water events were introduced at the 1999 SPG. Swimmers from American Samoa, Fiji, Guam, New Caledonia, Northern Marianas, Micronesia, Palau, Papua New Guinea, Samoa, and Tahiti competed.

== Sources ==
- 1999 South Pacific Games Results. Oceania Sport Information Centre (Report). Archived from the original on 28 October 2015.
- 1999 South Pacific Games Medal Lists. Oceania Sport Information Centre (Report). Archived from the original on October 29, 2015.
