= 2005 South Pacific Mini Games =

VII South Pacific Mini Games
- Host city: Koror
- Country: Palau
- Nations: 20
- Events: 12 sports
- Opening: July 25, 2005
- Closing: August 4, 2005
- Opened by: Tommy Remengesau
- Torch lighter: Christopher Silas Adolf
- Main venue: National Stadium

The VII South Pacific Mini Games were held July 25-August 4, 2005 in Palau.

Torch lighter was athlete Christopher Silas Adolf, Palau's first Olympian.

== Participating countries ==
- American Samoa
- Cook Islands
- Fiji
- Kiribati
- Guam
- Marshall Islands
- FS Micronesia
- Nauru
- New Caledonia
- Niue
- Norfolk Island
- Northern Mariana Islands
- Palau
- Papua New Guinea
- Samoa
- Solomon Islands
- Tonga
- Tuvalu
- Vanuatu
- Wallis and Futuna
Tahiti and Tokelau did not send teams to the games, with Tahiti citing a need to conserve costs.

== Sports ==
12 sports were contested at the 2005 Pacific Mini Games:

- Athletics (39) ^{a}
- Baseball (1) ^{b}
- Basketball (2) ^{c}
- Beach volleyball (2) ^{d}
- Outrigger canoeing (10) ^{e}
- Softball (2) ^{f}
- Swimming (40) ^{g}
- Table tennis (7) ^{h}
- Tennis (7) ^{i}
- Triathlon (3) ^{j}
- Weightlifting (45) ^{k}
- Wrestling (14) ^{l}
Note: Numbers in parentheses indicate the number of events in each sport.

== Final medal table ==
New Caledonia dominated the medal tally, finishing ahead of Fiji. The small nation of Nauru finished in third place with 18 gold medals; all of them gold and won in the weightlifting competition. Host nation Palau also won 18 medals and finished in sixth position on the table.

Rank	Nation	Gold	Silver	Bronze	Total
1	New Caledonia	56	29	25	110
2	Fiji	23	21	16	60
3	Nauru	18	0	0	18
4	Papua New Guinea	16	11	8	35
5	Samoa	16	8	2	26
6	Palau	9	3	6	18
7	Guam	6	9	14	29
8	Cook Islands	5	9	7	21
9	Federated States of Micronesia	5	1	5	11
10	Tonga	5	1	3	9
11	Northern Marianas	4	12	7	23
12	Solomon Islands	2	6	3	11
13	Vanuatu	2	3	1	6
14	Wallis and Futuna	2	1	1	4
15	Marshall Islands	1	3	0	4
16	Niue	0	5	0	5
17	Norfolk Island	0	1	1	2
18	Tuvalu	0	0	2	2
19	American Samoa	0	0	1	1
	Kiribati	0	0	0	0
No medal awarded ^{m}		2	49	77	128
Totals		172	172	179	523

Rank	Nation	Gold	Silver	Bronze	Total
1	New Caledonia	56	29	25	110
2	Fiji	23	21	16	60
3	Nauru	18	0	0	18
4	Papua New Guinea	16	11	8	35
5	Samoa	16	8	2	26
6	Palau	9	3	6	18
7	Guam	6	9	14	29
8	Cook Islands	5	9	7	21
9	Micronesia	5	1	5	11
10	Tonga	5	1	3	9
11	Northern Mariana Islands	4	12	7	23
12	Solomon Islands	2	6	3	11
13	Vanuatu	2	3	1	6
14	Wallis and Futuna	2	1	1	4
15	Marshall Islands	1	3	0	4
16	Niue	0	5	0	5
17	Norfolk Island	0	1	1	2
18	Tuvalu	0	0	2	2
19	American Samoa	0	0	1	1
20	French Polynesia	0	0	0	0
20	Kiribati	0	0	0	0
20	Tokelau	0	0	0	0
Totals (22 entries)		170	123	102	395

== Notes ==
^a "Athletics". 2005 South Pacific Mini Games. 2005. Archived from the original on 2010-04-13.
^b "Baseball". 2005 South Pacific Mini Games. 2005. Archived from the original on 2015-05-22.
^c Basketball was included in the 2005 Mini Games in lieu of the FIBA Oceania Tournament. "Basketball". 2005 South Pacific Mini Games. 2005. Archived from the original on 2011-10-26.
^d "Beach Volleyball". 2005 South Pacific Mini Games. 2005. Archived from the original on 2010-04-13.
^e "Outrigger Canoeing (Va'a)". 2005 South Pacific Mini Games. 2005. Archived from the original on 2010-04-14.
^f "Softball". 2005 South Pacific Mini Games. 2005. Archived from the original on 2010-04-13.
^g "Swimming". 2005 South Pacific Mini Games. 2005. Archived from the original on 2010-04-14.
^h "Table Tennis". 2005 South Pacific Mini Games. 2005. Archived from the original on 2010-04-14.
^i "Tennis". 2005 South Pacific Mini Games. 2005. Archived from the original on 2010-04-14.
^j "Triathlon". 2005 South Pacific Mini Games. 2005. Archived from the original on April 14, 2010.
^k "Weightlifting". 2005 South Pacific Mini Games. 2005. Archived from the original on 2010-04-13.
^l "Wrestling". 2005 South Pacific Mini Games. 2005. Archived from the original on 2010-04-14.
^m As per the Pacific Games Charter:
1. Only when five or more competitors compete in an event, will the Gold, Silver and Bronze medal be awarded.
2. Where only one competitor competes in an event, no medal is awarded.
3. Where two competitors compete in an event, only a Gold Medal will be awarded.
4. Where three competitors compete, only a Gold Medal will be awarded
5. Where four competitors compete, only a Gold and Silver Medal will be awarded.
6. Table Tennis award two bronze medals when a minimum of 5 competitors compete.

== Sources ==
- "No Medal Awarded". Palau South Pacific Mini Games. Archived from the original on 20 September 2017.
