= 1995 South Pacific Games =

10th edition of the South Pacific Games

- Host city: Papeete, Tahiti
- Country: French Polynesia
- Nations: 12
- Athletes: ~2,000 ^{*}
- Events: 25 sports ^{†}
- Opening: August 25, 1995
- Closing: September 5, 1995

The 10th South Pacific Games (French: 10e Jeux du Pacifique sud; Tahitian: A 10 o te Ha‘utira‘a no Pātifita), also known as Papeete 1995 (Tahitian: Papeʻete 1995), held in Papeete, French Polynesia from 25 August to 5 September 1995, was the tenth edition of the South Pacific Games.

The 1995 games were affected by the decision by France to resume nuclear testing at Mururoa in French Polynesia later that year. Western Samoa, American Samoa, Nauru and Niue boycotted in protest.

== Participating countries ==
Twelve Pacific nations competed at the 1995 South Pacific Games:

- Cook Islands
- Fiji
- French Polynesia
- Guam
- New Caledonia
- Norfolk Island
- Northern Marianas
- Papua New Guinea
- Solomon Islands
- Tonga
- Vanuatu
- Wallis and Futuna
Note: A number in parentheses indicate the size of a country's team (where known).

== Sports ==
Sports contested at the 1995 South Pacific Games included:^{†}

- Archery (8)
- Athletics (42) ^{a}
- Basketball (2)
- Bodybuilding (8) ^{b}
- Boxing (12) ^{c}
- Cycling
- Football (1)
- Golf (4) ^{d}
- Judo (18)
- Karate (12) ^{a}
- Netball (1) ^{e}
- Outrigger canoeing (8) ^{f}
- Powerlifting (18) ^{g}
- Rugby union (1) ^{h}
- Sailing (8) ^{i}
- Shooting
- Surfing (8) ^{j}
- Swimming (32) ^{a}
- Table tennis (7)
- Taekwondo (9) ^{a}
- Tennis (7) ^{k}
- Triathlon (3)
- Underwater fishing (2)
- Volleyball (2)
- Weightlifting (51)

Note: A number in parentheses indicates how many medal events were contested in that sport (where known).

== Medal table ==
New Caledonia was dominant in taekwondo, karate and table-tennis as well as competitive in swimming and athletics to top the table in 1995:

Rank	Nation	Gold	Silver	Bronze	Total
1	New Caledonia (NCL)	82	57	43	182
2	French Polynesia (TAH)	76	76	45	197
3	Fiji (FIJ)	32	44	64	140
4	Papua New Guinea (PNG)	32	29	40	101
5	Wallis and Futuna (WLF)	8	3	8	19
6	Guam (GUM)	7	10	24	41
7	Tonga (TON)	6	6	14	26
8	Cook Islands (COK)	4	2	6	12
9	Solomon Islands (SOL)	3	8	13	24
10	Vanuatu (VAN)	3	6	10	19
11	Northern Mariana Islands (MNP)	0	1	2	3
12	Norfolk Island (NFK)	0	0	1	1
Totals (12 entries)		253	242	270	765

== Notes ==
^* There were approximately 2,000 athletes at the 1995 SPG. The pro-independence Tavini Huiraatira party asked the athletes attending to protest against French nuclear testing by wearing coloured armbands and scarves.

^† As reported in Pacific Islands Monthly, Tahiti had decided to host 22 sports but agreed to include four other events: netball, powerlifting, surfing, and squash (although according to Squash Fiji, the sport was not contested in 1995 due to a lack of facilities). Sailing, and weightlifting, gained inclusion. The other sports were:

- Athletics
- Soccer
- Basketball
- Swimming
- Tennis
- Boxing
- Golf
- Bodybuilding
- Judo
- Archery
- Triathlon
- Volleyball
- Table tennis
- Underwater fishing
- Cycling
- Taekwando
- Outrigger canoeing
- Karate
- Rugby union
- Shooting

^a New Caledonia won medals in karate, taekwondo and table-tennis as well as athletics and swimming.

^b Body Building was on the South Pacific Games program for the first time in 1995.

^c Boxing: Of the 12 weight divisions for men only, PNG won 5, Tahiti 3, Solomon Islands and Tonga 2 each. Temo Kolitapa represented Fiji at the 1995 Games.

^d A postage stamp depicting golf was issued by New Caledonia for the 1995 South Pacific Games.

^e Fiji's women won the netball gold medal in Tahiti.

^f Outrigger canoeing featured at all three South Pacific Games, from 1995 to 2003. The sport was introduced to the Mini Games in 2005.

^g Powerlifting was contested at the 1995 Games in 8 weight classes for women and 10 for men. Full details recorded in Power-News Australia.

^h Rugby: New Caledonia won the gold medal, defeating hosts Tahiti.

^i Sailing: There were six sailboard events, as well as two for the Hobie 16 (individual and team).

^j Fiji competed in surfing at the SPG in 95, 03 and 07 and at the SPMG in 01.

^k Tennis: Ana-Marie Ramos won a silver medal for Guam.

== Sources ==
- 1995 South Pacific Games Results. Oceania Sport Information Centre (Report). Archived from the original on 30 October 2015.
