= 2003 South Pacific Games =

12th edition of the South Pacific Games

XII South Pacific Games
- Official logo of the Games
- Host city: Suva
- Country: Fiji
- Nations: 22
- Athletes: ~5,000
- Events: 32 sports
- Opening: June 28, 2003
- Closing: July 12, 2003
- Opened by: Josefa Iloilo
- Main venue: National Stadium

The 12th South Pacific Games (Fijian: 12 ni Qito ena Ceva ni Pasifika), also known as Suva 2003, were held in Suva, Fiji from 28 June to 12 July 2003.

The Games were the 12th South Pacific Games to be held since the event's inception and were the 40th anniversary of their beginnings in 1963. It was also the third time in the event's history that they had been hosted in Suva. For the first time, the Games included both traditional multi-sport event disciplines such as athletics and swimming together with region-specific and smaller events such as outrigger canoeing, surfing and lawn bowls. Almost 5,000 athletes participated in the Games.

== Organisation ==
Fijian government funding aided by a $16 million aid package from the People's Republic of China saw the construction of a new gymnasium and indoor sports center, swimming pool and stadium, field hockey pitch and stands as well as the upgrading of existing facilities for other sports.

A strong corporate sponsorship package (including some 20 corporate sponsors), a first for the games, enabled the organizers to expand the scope of the event. A colorful media and publicity campaign - including the Games' mascot, a blue lizard named Tau (meaning "friend" in Fijian) - generated interest and enthusiasm amongst the Fijian public. Schools and youth groups were involved in interactive programs such as the adopt-a-country program.

The 2003 SPG were the biggest Games to date. There were some 300 medal ceremonies with over 860 presentations and 2,300 individual medals.

== Sports ==
The following sports were competed:

- Archery
- Athletics
- Badminton
- Baseball
- Basketball
- Beach volleyball
- Bodybuilding
- Boxing
- Cricket
- Cycling
- Football
- Golf
- Hockey
- Judo
- Karate
- Lawn bowls
- Netball
- Powerlifting
- Rugby sevens
- Sailing
- Shooting
- Squash
- Surfing
- Swimming
- Table tennis
- Taekwondo
- Tennis
- Touch rugby
- Triathlon
- Va'a
- Volleyball
- Weightlifting
Note: Full results for all sports have been published on the 2003 SPG official website.

== Results ==
Hosts Fiji won the first gold medals of the games in women's archery and went on to top the athletics medal count to add to their best-ever medal haul at the SPG. Guam retained its place in baseball winning their second SPG gold medal. The cricket final saw Papua New Guinea overcome Fiji by a single run for the gold medal.

Fijian athletics dominated the athletics events winning a total of 19 gold medals. Makelesi Bulikiombo, the Fijian flag-bearer in the opening ceremony, won 5 gold medals and broke 4 games records. Fiji also took gold, silver and bronze in each of the men's and women's 100m and 200m and both gold and silver in the 400m.

The football competition was one of the sports to be held in venues other than Suva. Fiji won the men's final beating New Caledonia while Papua New Guinea took the first-ever women's football gold medal in a round robin format.

Continuing their domination at the games, Fiji won a further gold in the first-ever women's field hockey competition at the SPG.

The Pacific region-specific sports of outrigger canoeing were contested between Tahiti and New Caledonia and Tonga and Tahiti surfed to gold at the Tavarua breaks.

== Medal table ==
New Caledonia topped the medal count.

* Host nation (Fiji)

Rank	Nation	Gold	Silver	Bronze	Total
1	New Caledonia (NCL)	93	73	74	240
2	Fiji (FIJ)*	65	59	53	177
3	French Polynesia (TAH)	55	28	40	123
4	Papua New Guinea (PNG)	33	26	17	76
5	Nauru (NRU)	24	20	2	46
6	Samoa (SAM)	18	17	20	55
7	Tonga (TON)	6	9	5	20
8	Guam (GUM)	6	6	6	18
9	Federated States of Micronesia (FSM)	3	5	3	11
10	Vanuatu (VAN)	2	9	8	19
11	Kiribati (KIR)	2	2	8	12
12	Cook Islands (COK)	1	6	11	18
13	Solomon Islands (SOL)	1	5	8	14
14	Wallis and Futuna (WLF)	0	4	5	9
15	Norfolk Island (NFK)	0	3	4	7
16	American Samoa (ASA)	0	3	1	4
17	Palau (PLW)	0	1	3	4
18	Northern Mariana Islands (MNP)	0	1	1	2
19	Tokelau (TKL)	0	1	0	1
20	Niue (NIU)	0	0	5	5
21	Marshall Islands (MHL)	0	0	0	0
21	Tuvalu (TUV)	0	0	0	0
Totals (22 entries)		309	278	274	861

== See also ==
- Athletics at the 2003 South Pacific Games
- Swimming at the 2003 South Pacific Games
- Vodafone Arena (Fiji)

== Sources ==
- South Pacific Games 2003 Medal Tally – Sport Medals. Sports Pulse (Report). Archived from the original on 4 March 2016.
- 2003 South Pacific Games Results. Oceania Sport Information Centre (Report). Archived from the original on 31 October 2015.
