= Oceania Zonal Volleyball Association =

Zonal association of volleyball in Oceania

- Abbreviation: OZVA
- Formation: December 1993; 32 years ago
- Type: Volleyball organisation
- Headquarters: Avarua, Cook Islands
- Region served: Oceania
- Members: 20 national federations
- Official languages: English
- President: Hugh Graham
- Parent organization: Asian Volleyball Confederation
- Website: oceaniavolleyball.com

The Oceania Zonal Volleyball Association (OZVA) is one of five zonal associations of governance in volleyball within the Asian Volleyball Confederation (AVC). It governs indoor volleyball and beach volleyball in Oceania. OZVA consists of 20 national federation members which are full members with the Fédération Internationale de Volleyball (FIVB) and 4 associate members. Among these, 17 national federations represent the National Olympic Committees (NOCs) of their respective countries and dependent territories, allowing them to participate in the Olympic Games.

OZVA consists of the national volleyball federations of Oceania and run zonal championships including the Oceania Men's Volleyball Championship and Oceania Women's Volleyball Championship. It also promotes regional volleyball, supports the creation of national federations affiliated with FIVB, ensures compliance with FIVB regulations, plans annual activities, and reports competition results to the FIVB and confederations.

The current president, Hugh Graham, president of the Cook Islands Sports and National Olympic Committee, was elected as OZVA's president for the 2024–2028 term in Honolulu, Hawaii, United States, in March 2024. His election also secured him the position of vice-president within the continental governing body, AVC.

== National federations ==
The Oceania Zonal Volleyball Association has 20 full national federation members and 4 associate members.

Code	Federation	National teams	Founded	FIVB affiliation	AVC affiliation	IOC member
ASA	American Samoa	Men's; U23; U21; U19; U17; Women's; U23; U21; U19; U17				Yes
AUS	Australia	Men's; U23; U21; U19; U17; Women's; U23; U21; U19; U17	1963			Yes
COK	Cook Islands	Men's; U23; U21; U19; U17; Women's; U23; U21; U19; U17				Yes
FIJ	Fiji	Men's; U23; U21; U19; U17; Women's; U23; U21; U19; U17				Yes
PYF	French Polynesia	Men's; U23; U21; U19; U17; Women's; U23; U21; U19; U17				No
GUM	Guam	Men's; U23; U21; U19; U17; Women's; U23; U21; U19; U17				Yes
KIR	Kiribati	Men's; U23; U21; U19; U17; Women's; U23; U21; U19; U17				Yes
MSH	Marshall Islands	Men's; U23; U21; U19; U17; Women's; U23; U21; U19; U17				Yes
FSM	Federated States of Micronesia	Men's; U23; U21; U19; U17; Women's; U23; U21; U19; U17				Yes
NZL	New Zealand	Men's; U23; U21; U19; U17; Women's; U23; U21; U19; U17				Yes
NIU	Niue	Men's; U23; U21; U19; U17; Women's; U23; U21; U19; U17				No
NMI	Northern Mariana Islands	Men's; U23; U21; U19; U17; Women's; U23; U21; U19; U17				No
PAU	Palau	Men's; U23; U21; U19; U17; Women's; U23; U21; U19; U17				Yes
PNG	Papua New Guinea	Men's; U23; U21; U19; U17; Women's; U23; U21; U19; U17				Yes
SAM	Samoa	Men's; U23; U21; U19; U17; Women's; U23; U21; U19; U17				Yes
SOL	Solomon Islands	Men's; U23; U21; U19; U17; Women's; U23; U21; U19; U17				Yes
TGA	Tonga	Men's; U23; U21; U19; U17; Women's; U23; U21; U19; U17				Yes
TUV	Tuvalu	Men's; U23; U21; U19; U17; Women's; U23; U21; U19; U17				Yes
VAN	Vanuatu	Men's; U23; U21; U19; U17; Women's; U23; U21; U19; U17				Yes

=== Associate members ===
Code	Federation	National teams	Founded	IOC member
NRU	Nauru	Men's; U23; U21; U19; U17; Women's; U23; U21; U19; U17		No
NCL	New Caledonia	Men's; U23; U21; U19; U17; Women's; U23; U21; U19; U17		No
TKL	Tokelau	Men's; U23; U21; U19; U17; Women's; U23; U21; U19; U17		No
WLF	Wallis and Futuna	Men's; U23; U21; U19; U17; Women's; U23; U21; U19; U17		No

== Competitions ==
=== OZVA active competitions ===
National teams:

- Oceania Zonal Men's Volleyball Championship
- Oceania Zonal Women's Volleyball Championship

Co-sanctioned competitions with the Pacific Games Council

- Pacific Games Volleyball Tournament (Zonal Championships)
- Pacific Mini Games Volleyball Tournament (Zonal Championships)
- Pacific Games Beach Volleyball Tournament (Zonal Championships)
- Pacific Mini Games Beach Volleyball Tournament (Zonal Championships)

Co-sanctioned competitions with the Micronesian Games Council

- Micronesian Games Volleyball Tournament (Western Sub-zonal Championships)
- Micronesian Games Beach Volleyball Tournament (Western Sub-zonal Championships)

== Current title holders ==
=== Indoor volleyball ===
Competition	Champions	Runners-up	3rd place	Ref.
National teams (men)
Oceania Zonal Championship (2026)	Australia	New Caledonia	Wallis and Futuna	
Pacific Games (2023)	French Polynesia	Papua New Guinea	Samoa	
Pacific Mini Games (2013)	Papua New Guinea	Wallis and Futuna	New Caledonia	
Micronesian Games (2024)	Federated States of Micronesia (Pohnpei)	Palau	Kiribati	
National teams (women)
Oceania Zonal Championship (2026)	Australia	American Samoa	Guam	
Pacific Games (2023)	French Polynesia	New Caledonia	Fiji	
Pacific Mini Games (2013)	French Polynesia	New Caledonia	Fiji	
Micronesian Games (2024)	Federated States of Micronesia (Kosrae)	Palau	Marshall Islands	

=== Beach volleyball ===
Competition	Champions	Runners-up	3rd place	Ref.
National teams (men)
Pacific Games (2023)	Australia; Ben Hood; D'Artagnan Potts	Tuvalu; Ampex Isaac; Saaga Malosa	Northern Mariana Islands; Andrew Johnson; Logan Mister	
Pacific Mini Games (2022)	Vanuatu; James Chilia; Stivano Banga	Northern Mariana Islands; Andrew Johnson; Logan Mister	Tuvalu; Ampex Isaac; Saaga Malosa	
Micronesian Games (2024)	Palau	Nauru	Northern Mariana Islands	
National teams (women)
Pacific Games (2023)	Australia; Jana Milutinovic; Stefanie Fejes	Solomon Islands; Hannah U'una; Kirstain Puia	Vanuatu; Majabelle Lawac; Sherysyn Toko	
Pacific Mini Games (2022)	French Polynesia; Heikura Tauraa; Kahaialanie Tauraa	Vanuatu; Majabelle Lawac; Sherysyn Toko	Wallis and Futuna; Gladys Pressense; Tekela Fiafialoto	
Micronesian Games (2024)	Palau	Guatemala	Northern Mariana Islands	

== See also ==
- Central Asian Volleyball Association
- Eastern Asian Volleyball Association
- Southeast Asian Volleyball Association
- West Asian Volleyball Association
