= 2018 FIVB Men's Volleyball World Championship qualification =

- Dates: 27 May 2017 – 12 November 2017
- Teams: 127+3 (from 5 confederations)

The 2018 FIVB Men's Volleyball World Championship featured 24 teams. Three places were allocated to the hosts, Italy and Bulgaria and the titleholder, Poland. The remaining 21 places were determined by a qualification process, in which entrants from among the other teams from the five FIVB confederations competed.

== Qualified teams ==
Team qualified for World Championship Team failed to qualify for World Championship Team withdrew for World Championship Team expelled from the tournament by FIVB prior to playing a match

Country	Confederation	Qualified as	Qualified on	Previous appearances			Previous best performance
Country	Confederation	Qualified as	Qualified on	Total	First	Last	Previous best performance
Italy	CEV	Host country	9 December 2015	16	1949	2014	Champions (1990, 1994, 1998)
Bulgaria	CEV	Host country	9 December 2015	17	1949	2014	Runners-up (1970)
Poland	CEV	Defending champions	21 September 2014	16	1949	2014	Champions (1974, 2014)
Serbia^{1}	CEV	CEV Second Round Pool E winners	27 May 2017	9	1956	2014	Runners-up (1998)
Netherlands	CEV	CEV Second Round Pool B winners	28 May 2017	11	1949	2002	Runners-up (1994)
Slovenia	CEV	CEV Second Round Pool C winners	28 May 2017	0	None		None
Finland	CEV	CEV Second Round Pool F winners	28 May 2017	7	1952	2014	9th place (2014)
Russia^{2}	CEV	CEV Second Round Pool D winners	28 May 2017	18	1949	2014	Champions (1949, 1952, 1960, 1962, 1978, 1982)
France	CEV	CEV Second Round Pool A winners	28 May 2017	15	1949	2014	3rd place (2002)
Japan	AVC	AVC Final Round Pool B winners	15 July 2017	14	1960	2010	3rd place (1970, 1974)
Australia	AVC	AVC Final Round Pool B runners-up	16 July 2017	6	1982	2014	15th place (2014)
Belgium	CEV	CEV Third Round Pool G winners	23 July 2017	8	1949	2014	8th place (1970)
Brazil	CSV	2017 South American champions	11 August 2017	16	1956	2014	Champions (2002, 2006, 2010)
China	AVC	AVC Final Round Pool A runners-up	13 August 2017	13	1956	2014	7th place (1978, 1982)
Iran	AVC	AVC Final Round Pool A winners	13 August 2017	5	1970	2014	6th place (2014)
Argentina	CSV	CSV Qualifier winners	2 September 2017	11	1960	2014	3rd place (1982)
Dominican Republic	NORCECA	2017 NORCECA runners-up	30 September 2017	1	1974		22nd place (1974)
United States	NORCECA	2017 NORCECA champions	30 September 2017	15	1956	2014	Champions (1986)
Canada	NORCECA	2017 NORCECA 3rd place	1 October 2017	10	1974	2014	7th place (2014)
Tunisia	CAVB	2017 African champions	27 October 2017	9	1962	2014	15th place (2006)
Egypt	CAVB	2017 African runners-up	27 October 2017	8	1974	2014	13th place (2010)
Cameroon	CAVB	2017 African 3rd place	29 October 2017	3	1990	2014	13th place (2010)
Puerto Rico	NORCECA	NORCECA Final Four winners	12 November 2017	4	1974	2014	12th place (2006)
Cuba	NORCECA	NORCECA Final Four runners-up	12 November 2017	14	1956	2014	Runners-up (1990, 2010)

Notes
^{1} Competed as SFR Yugoslavia from 1956 to 1990 and as Serbia and Montenegro (FR Yugoslavia) from 1994 to 2006; 3rd appearance as Serbia.
^{2} Competed as Soviet Union from 1949 to 1990; 7th appearance as Russia.

== Qualification process ==
The distribution by confederation for the 2018 FIVB Men's Volleyball World Championship was:

- Asia and Oceania (AVC): 4 places
- Africa (CAVB): 3 places
- Europe (CEV): 7 places (+ Italy and Bulgaria qualified automatically as host nations and Poland qualified automatically as the reigning champions for a total of 10 places)
- South America (CSV): 2 places
- North America (NORCECA): 5 places

=== Summary of qualification ===
Confederation	Teams started	Teams that have qualified	Teams that can still qualify	Teams that have been eliminated	Remaining places in finals	Total places in finals	Qualifying start date	Qualifying end date
AVC	20	4	0	16	0	4	15 September 2016	14 August 2017
CAVB	21	3	0	18	0	3	20 May 2017	29 October 2017
CEV	39+3	7+3	0	32	0	7+3	13 May 2016	23 July 2017
CSV	8	2	0	6	0	2	7 August 2017	2 September 2017
NORCECA	39	5	0	34	0	5	9 July 2016	12 November 2017
Total	127+3	21+3	0	106	0	21+3	13 May 2016	12 November 2017

Note: CEV total includes +3 for Italy as co-hosts, Bulgaria as co-hosts, and Poland as reigning champions.

== Confederation qualification ==
=== AVC ===
==== Teams ====
- Australia (final round → Qualified)
- Bangladesh (Subzonal Round)
- China (final round → Qualified)
- Chinese Taipei (Zonal Round → Final Round)
- Fiji (Zonal Round)
- Iran (final round → Qualified)
- Japan (final round → Qualified)
- Kazakhstan (Zonal Round → Final Round)
- Kyrgyzstan (Subzonal Round → Zonal Round)
- Macau (Zonal Round)
- Maldives (Subzonal Round)
- Myanmar (Zonal Round)
- New Zealand (Zonal Round → Final Round)
- Pakistan (Zonal Round)
- Qatar (Zonal Round → Final Round)
- South Korea (final round)
- Thailand (Zonal Round → Final Round)
- Tonga (Zonal Round)
- United Arab Emirates (Zonal Round)
- Vietnam (Zonal Round)

Withdrawal

- Afghanistan (~~Subzonal Round~~)
- Turkmenistan (~~Subzonal Round~~)

Suspension

- India (~~Zonal Round~~)

==== Final positions (final round) ====
The draw for the second round was held on 19 March 2017, at the Dusit Princess Srinakarin Hotel in Bangkok, Thailand.

Qualification to 2018 World Championship

Pool A
Rank	Team	Pld	W	Pts
1	Iran	4	4	12
2	China	4	3	9
3	Qatar	4	2	5
4	South Korea	4	1	4
5	Kazakhstan	4	0	0

Pool B
Rank	Team	Pld	W	Pts
1	Japan	4	4	11
2	Australia	4	3	10
3	Chinese Taipei	4	2	6
4	Thailand	4	1	3
5	New Zealand	4	0	0

=== CAVB ===
==== Teams ====
- Algeria (first round → 2017 African Championship)
- Botswana (first round → 2017 African Championship)
- Cameroon (2017 African Championship → Qualified)
- Cape Verde (first round → ~~2017 African Championship~~)
- Chad (2017 African Championship)
- Congo (first round → ~~2017 African Championship~~)
- DR Congo (first round → 2017 African Championship)
- Egypt (2017 African Championship → Qualified)
- Ghana (first round → 2017 African Championship)
- Ivory Coast (first round)
- Kenya (first round → 2017 African Championship)
- Libya (first round → 2017 African Championship)
- Morocco (first round → 2017 African Championship)
- Mozambique (first round → ~~2017 African Championship~~)
- Niger (first round → 2017 African Championship)
- Nigeria (first round → 2017 African Championship)
- Rwanda (first round → 2017 African Championship)
- South Sudan (first round)
- Eswatini (first round)
- Tunisia (2017 African Championship → Qualified)
- Uganda (first round)

Withdrawal

- Burundi (~~First Round~~)
- Central African Republic (~~First Round~~)
- Gabon (~~First Round~~)
- Gambia (~~First Round~~)
- Lesotho (~~First Round~~)
- Madagascar (~~First Round~~)
- Malawi (~~First Round~~)
- Mauritius (~~First Round~~)
- Namibia (~~First Round~~)
- Senegal (~~First Round~~)
- Seychelles (~~First Round~~)
- Sudan (~~First Round~~)
- Tanzania (~~First Round~~)
- Zambia (~~2017 African Championship~~)
- Zimbabwe (~~First Round~~)

==== Final positions (2017 African Championship) ====
Preliminary round

Qualification to Play-offs semifinals

Pool A
Rank	Team	Pld	W	Pts
1	Egypt	2	2	6
2	DR Congo	2	1	3
3	Niger	2	0	0

Pool C
Rank	Team	Pld	W	Pts
1	Cameroon	2	2	6
2	Morocco	2	1	3
3	Nigeria	2	0	0

Pool B
Rank	Team	Pld	W	Pts
1	Tunisia	3	3	8
2	Libya	3	1	4
3	Ghana	3	1	4
4	Kenya	3	1	2

Pool D
Rank	Team	Pld	W	Pts
1	Algeria	3	3	9
2	Rwanda	3	2	6
3	Botswana	3	1	3
4	Chad	3	0	0

Play-offs semifinals

Winners qualified for Play-offs main round

Date	Time		Score		Set 1	Set 2	Set 3	Set 4	Set 5	Total	Report
26 Oct	14:00	Algeria	3–0	DR Congo	25–19	25–13	25–19			75–51	
26 Oct	16:00	Tunisia	3–0	Morocco	25–21	25–17	25–22			75–60	
26 Oct	18:00	Cameroon	3–2	Libya	27–25	22–25	25–21	23–25	15–9	112–105	
26 Oct	20:00	Egypt	3–0	Rwanda	25–14	25–18	25–14			75–46	

Play-offs main round

Winners qualified for 2018 World Championship
Losers qualified for Play-offs second round

Date	Time		Score		Set 1	Set 2	Set 3	Set 4	Set 5	Total	Report
27 Oct	19:00	Algeria	2–3	Tunisia	27–25	14–25	25–21	23–25	15–17	104–113	
27 Oct	21:00	Egypt	3–0	Cameroon	26–24	25–22	25–23			76–69	

Play-offs second round

Winner qualified for 2018 World Championship

Date	Time		Score		Set 1	Set 2	Set 3	Set 4	Set 5	Total	Report
29 Oct	18:00	Cameroon	3–1	Algeria	23–25	25–21	25–21	27–25		100–92	

=== CEV ===
==== Teams ====
- Andorra (first round)
- Austria (second round)
- Azerbaijan (second round)
- Belarus (second round → Third Round)
- Belgium (second round → Third Round → Qualified)
- Croatia (second round)
- Cyprus (first round → Second Round)
- Czech Republic (second round)
- Denmark (second round)
- Estonia (second round → Third Round)
- Faroe Islands (first round)
- Finland (second round → Qualified)
- France (second round → Qualified)
- Georgia (second round)
- Germany (second round → Third Round)
- Greece (second round)
- Hungary (second round)
- Iceland (first round → Second Round)
- Israel (second round)
- Kosovo (second round)
- Latvia (second round)
- Luxembourg (first round → Second Round)
- Moldova (second round)
- Montenegro (second round)
- Netherlands (second round → Qualified)
- Northern Ireland (first round → Second Round)
- Norway (second round)
- Portugal (second round)
- Romania (second round)
- Russia (second round → Qualified)
- Scotland (first round)
- Serbia (second round → Qualified)
- Slovakia (second round → Third Round)
- Slovenia (second round → Qualified)
- Spain (second round → Third Round)
- Sweden (second round)
- Switzerland (second round)
- Turkey (second round)
- Ukraine (second round)

==== Final positions (second round) ====
Qualification to 2018 World Championship
Qualification to Third round

Pool A
Rank	Team	Pld	W	Pts
1	France	5	5	15
2	Germany	5	4	12
3	Turkey	5	3	9
4	Ukraine	5	2	6
5	Azerbaijan	5	1	3
6	Iceland	5	0	0

Pool C
Rank	Team	Pld	W	Pts
1	Slovenia	5	5	15
2	Belgium	5	4	12
3	Portugal	5	3	9
4	Israel	5	2	5
5	Latvia	5	1	4
6	Georgia	5	0	0

Pool E
Rank	Team	Pld	W	Pts
1	Serbia	5	5	15
2	Belarus	5	4	11
3	Switzerland	5	3	9
4	Denmark	5	2	5
5	Croatia	5	1	4
6	Norway	5	0	1

Pool B
Rank	Team	Pld	W	Pts
1	Netherlands	5	5	13
2	Slovakia	5	3	9
3	Greece	5	3	9
4	Austria	5	2	8
5	Moldova	5	1	5
6	Luxembourg	5	0	1

Pool D
Rank	Team	Pld	W	Pts
1	Russia	5	5	15
2	Estonia	5	4	12
3	Romania	5	3	9
4	Montenegro	5	2	5
5	Hungary	5	1	4
6	Kosovo	5	0	0

Pool F
Rank	Team	Pld	W	Pts
1	Finland	5	5	15
2	Spain	5	4	10
3	Czech Republic	5	3	10
4	Sweden	5	2	6
5	Cyprus	5	1	4
6	Northern Ireland	5	0	0

==== Final positions (third round) ====
Qualification to 2018 World Championship

Pool G
Rank	Team	Pld	W	Pts
1	Belgium	5	5	15
2	Estonia	5	3	10
3	Germany	5	3	8
4	Slovakia	5	2	6
5	Spain	5	2	5
6	Belarus	5	0	1

=== CSV ===
==== Teams ====
- Argentina (2017 South American Championship → Qualification Tournament → Qualified)
- Brazil (2017 South American Championship → Qualified)
- Chile (2017 South American Championship → Qualification Tournament)
- Colombia (2017 South American Championship)
- Paraguay (2017 South American Championship)
- Peru (2017 South American Championship)
- Uruguay (2017 South American Championship)
- Venezuela (2017 South American Championship → Qualification Tournament)

==== Final positions (2017 South American Championship) ====
Preliminary round

Qualification to Play-offs semifinals and Qualification tournament

Pool A
Rank	Team	Pld	W	Pts
1	Brazil	3	3	9
2	Venezuela	3	2	6
3	Colombia	3	1	3
4	Paraguay	3	0	0

Pool B
Rank	Team	Pld	W	Pts
1	Argentina	3	3	9
2	Chile	3	2	6
3	Uruguay	3	1	2
4	Peru	3	0	1

Play-offs semifinals

Winners qualified for Play-offs final

Date	Time		Score		Set 1	Set 2	Set 3	Set 4	Set 5	Total	Report
10 Aug	18:30	Brazil	3–0	Chile	25–20	25–12	25–14			75–46	Result
10 Aug	20:30	Argentina	2–3	Venezuela	24–26	25–15	26–24	24–26	13–15	112–106	Result

Play-offs final

Winners qualified for 2018 World Championship

Date	Time		Score		Set 1	Set 2	Set 3	Set 4	Set 5	Total	Report
11 Aug	20:30	Venezuela	0–3	Brazil	21–25	6–25	18–25			45–75	Result

==== Final positions (qualification tournament) ====
Qualification to 2018 World Championship

Qualification Tournament
Rank	Team	Pld	W	Pts
1	Argentina	2	2	6
2	Chile	2	1	3
3	Venezuela	2	0	0

=== NORCECA ===
==== Teams ====
- Anguilla (first round → Second Round)
- Antigua and Barbuda (first round → Second Round)
- Aruba (first round)
- Bahamas (first round → Second Round)
- Barbados (second round)
- Belize (first round)
- Bermuda (first round)
- British Virgin Islands (first round)
- Canada (2017 NORCECA Championship → Qualified)
- Cayman Islands (first round)
- Costa Rica (2017 NORCECA Championship)
- Cuba (final Four → Qualified)
- Curaçao (first round → Second Round)
- Dominica (second round)
- Dominican Republic (first round → 2017 NORCECA Championship → Qualified)
- El Salvador (first round)
- Grenada (first round)
- Guadeloupe (first round)
- Guatemala (first round → 2017 NORCECA Championship → Final Four)
- Haiti (first round → Second Round)
- Honduras (first round)
- Jamaica (first round → Second Round)
- Martinique (first round → Second Round → 2017 NORCECA Championship)
- Mexico (2017 NORCECA Championship → Final Four)
- Montserrat (first round)
- Nicaragua (first round)
- Panama (first round)
- Puerto Rico (final Four → Qualified)
- Saint Kitts and Nevis (first round → Second Round)
- Saint Lucia (second round → 2017 NORCECA Championship)
- Saint Martin (first round → Second Round)
- Saint Vincent and the Grenadines (first round → Second Round → 2017 NORCECA Championship)
- Sint Eustatius (first round)
- Sint Maarten (first round → Second Round)
- Suriname (first round → Second Round)
- Trinidad and Tobago (second round → 2017 NORCECA Championship)
- Turks and Caicos Islands (first round)
- U.S. Virgin Islands (first round)
- United States (2017 NORCECA Championship → Qualified)

Withdrawal

- Bonaire (~~First Round~~)
- Saba (~~First Round~~)

==== Final positions (2017 NORCECA Championship) ====
Preliminary round

Qualification to Play-offs main round
Qualification to Play-offs semifinals

Pool A
Rank	Team	Pld	W	Pts
1	United States	2	2	10
2	Dominican Republic	2	1	5
3	Guatemala	2	0	0

Pool C
Rank	Team	Pld	W	Pts
1	Mexico	3	3	15
2	Costa Rica	3	1	9
3	Martinique	3	1	6
4	Saint Vincent and the Grenadines	3	0	0

Pool B
Rank	Team	Pld	W	Pts
1	Canada	2	2	10
2	Trinidad and Tobago	2	1	5
3	Saint Lucia	2	0	0

Play-offs semifinals

Winners qualified for Play-offs main round

Date	Time		Score		Set 1	Set 2	Set 3	Set 4	Set 5	Total	Report
29 Sep	17:00	Trinidad and Tobago	0–3	Dominican Republic	18–25	22–25	21–25			61–75	P2 P3
29 Sep	19:00	United States	3–0	Costa Rica	25–11	25–7	25–8			75–26	P2 P3

Play-offs main round

Winners qualified for 2018 World Championship
Losers qualified for Play-offs second round

Date	Time		Score		Set 1	Set 2	Set 3	Set 4	Set 5	Total	Report
30 Sep	17:48	Mexico	0–3	Dominican Republic	20–25	23–25	23–25			66–75	P2 P3
30 Sep	19:25	Canada	0–3	United States	20–25	22–25	21–25			63–75	P2 P3

Play-offs second round

Winners qualified for 2018 World Championship

Date	Time		Score		Set 1	Set 2	Set 3	Set 4	Set 5	Total	Report
1 Oct	15:00	Mexico	1–3	Canada	25–21	13–25	25–27	18–25		81–98	P2 P3

==== Final positions (final four) ====
Qualification to 2018 World Championship

Final Four
Rank	Team	Pld	W	Pts
1	Puerto Rico	3	2	10
2	Cuba	3	2	10
3	Mexico	3	2	10
4	Guatemala	3	0	0
