= Volleyball at the 2015 Pacific Games – Women's tournament =

Volleyball tournament

The women's volleyball tournament at the 2015 Pacific Games was held from July 11–18, 2015, at the Taurama Aquatic Centre Courts in Port Moresby. American Samoa won the gold medal by defeating Tahiti in the final.

== Participating teams ==
Nine women's teams participated in the tournament:

Pool A

- American Samoa
- Fiji
- Tahiti
- Tuvalu
- Wallis and Futuna

Pool B

- Guam
- New Caledonia
- Papua New Guinea
- Solomon Islands

== Preliminary round ==
=== Pool A ===
Pos	Team	Pld	W	L	Pts	SW	SL	SR	SPW	SPL	SPR	Qualification
1	American Samoa	4	4	0	12	12	1	12.000	327	194	1.686	Final round
2	Tahiti	4	3	1	8	9	5	1.800	308	247	1.247	Final round
3	Fiji	4	2	2	7	9	6	1.500	344	287	1.199	
4	Wallis and Futuna	4	1	3	3	3	9	0.333	181	278	0.651	
5	Tuvalu	4	0	4	0	0	12	0.000	146	300	0.487	

Date	Time		Score		Set 1	Set 2	Set 3	Set 4	Set 5	Total	Report
11 Jul	09:00	Tuvalu	0–3	Wallis and Futuna	14–25	17–25	22–25			53–75	
11 Jul	11:00	American Samoa	3–1	Fiji	30–28	27–25	20–25	25–17		102–95	
12 Jul	15:00	Fiji	3–0	Tuvalu	25–12	25–10	25–14			75–36	
12 Jul	17:00	American Samoa	3–0	Tahiti	25–17	25–18	25–21			75–56	
13 Jul	09:00	American Samoa	3–0	Wallis and Futuna	25–10	25–6	25–4			75–20	
13 Jul	11:00	Fiji	2–3	Tahiti	22–25	18–25	25–16	25–21	9–15	99–102	
14 Jul	15:00	American Samoa	3–0	Tuvalu	25–3	25–12	25–8			75–23	
14 Jul	17:00	Tahiti	3–0	Wallis and Futuna	25–9	25–18	25–12			75–39	
15 Jul	09:00	Tahiti	3–0	Tuvalu	25–11	25–8	25–15			75–34	
15 Jul	15:00	Fiji	3–0	Wallis and Futuna	25–11	25–17	25–19			75–47	

=== Pool B ===
Pos	Team	Pld	W	L	Pts	SW	SL	SR	SPW	SPL	SPR	Qualification
1	New Caledonia	3	3	0	9	9	1	9.000	250	165	1.515	Final round
2	Papua New Guinea	3	2	1	6	7	3	2.333	235	187	1.257	Final round
3	Solomon Islands	3	1	2	2	3	8	0.375	195	253	0.771	
4	Guam	3	0	3	1	2	9	0.222	184	259	0.710	

Date	Time		Score		Set 1	Set 2	Set 3	Set 4	Set 5	Total	Report
11 Jul	15:00	New Caledonia	3–0	Solomon Islands	25–15	25–16	25–12			75–43	
11 Jul	17:00	Guam	0–3	Papua New Guinea	14–25	15–25	15–25			44–75	
13 Jul	15:00	New Caledonia	3–1	Papua New Guinea	25–18	25–17	23–25	27–25		100–85	
13 Jul	17:00	Guam	2–3	Solomon Islands	25–21	18–25	20–25	25–21	15–17	103–109	
15 Jul	11:00	Guam	0–3	New Caledonia	11–25	13–25	13–25			37–75	
15 Jul	17:00	Papua New Guinea	3–0	Solomon Islands	25–10	25–21	25–12			75–43	

== Final round ==
Semifinals
17 July
American Samoa	3
Papua New Guinea	1
17 July
New Caledonia	0
Tahiti	3

Final
18 July
American Samoa	3
Tahiti	2
Third place
18 July
Papua New Guinea	1
New Caledonia	3

=== Semifinals ===
Date	Time		Score		Set 1	Set 2	Set 3	Set 4	Set 5	Total	Report
17 Sep	11:00	American Samoa	3–1	Papua New Guinea	25–14	25–27	25–22	25–17		100–80	
17 Sep	13:00	New Caledonia	0–3	Tahiti	14–25	18–25	22–25			54–75	

=== Seventh place game ===
Date	Time		Score		Set 1	Set 2	Set 3	Set 4	Set 5	Total	Report
16 Jul	09:00	Wallis and Futuna	3–1	Guam	26–24	25–18	23–25	25–21		99–88	

=== Fifth place game ===
Date	Time		Score		Set 1	Set 2	Set 3	Set 4	Set 5	Total	Report
16 Jul	11:00	Fiji	3–0	Solomon Islands	25–20	25–16	25–13			75–49	

=== Bronze medal match ===
Date	Time		Score		Set 1	Set 2	Set 3	Set 4	Set 5	Total	Report
18 Jul	09:00	Papua New Guinea	1–3	New Caledonia	14–25	27–25	22–25	17–25		80–100	

=== Gold medal match ===
Date	Time		Score		Set 1	Set 2	Set 3	Set 4	Set 5	Total	Report
18 Jul	13:00	American Samoa	3–2	Tahiti	25–23	23–25	25–19	19–25	17–15	109–107	

== See also ==
- Volleyball at the 2015 Pacific Games – Men's tournament
