= Volleyball at the 2011 Pacific Games – Men's tournament =

The Men's tournament of the Volleyball competition of the 2011 Pacific Games was held on August 29–September 9, 2011.

== Participating teams ==
- American Samoa
- Guam
- Fiji
- New Caledonia
- Papua New Guinea
- Samoa
- Tahiti
- Tuvalu
- Wallis and Futuna

== Preliminary round ==
=== Group A ===
Pos	Team	Pld	W	L	Pts	SW	SL	SR	SPW	SPL	SPR	Qualification
1	Tahiti	3	3	0	9	9	0	MAX	225	151	1.490	Semifinals
2	New Caledonia	3	2	1	6	6	3	2.000	217	175	1.240	Semifinals
3	Samoa	3	1	2	3	3	7	0.429	206	225	0.916	
4	Tuvalu	3	0	3	0	1	9	0.111	151	248	0.609	

Date	Time		Score		Set 1	Set 2	Set 3	Set 4	Set 5	Total	Report
30 Aug	19:00	Tahiti	3–0	Tuvalu	25–11	25–6	25–12			75–29	
31 Aug	12:00	Tahiti	3–0	Samoa	25–12	25–20	25–23			75–55	
31 Aug	19:00	New Caledonia	3–0	Tuvalu	25–17	25–12	25–18			75–47	
1 Sep	19:00	New Caledonia	3–0	Samoa	25–19	25–19	25–15			75–53	
2 Sep	19:00	Samoa	3–1	Tuvalu	25–14	23–25	25–16	25–20		98–75	
3 Sep	19:00	New Caledonia	0–3	Tahiti	23–25	23–25	21–25			67–75	

=== Group B ===
Pos	Team	Pld	W	L	Pts	SW	SL	SR	SPW	SPL	SPR	Qualification
1	Wallis and Futuna	4	4	0	12	12	1	12.000	322	244	1.320	Semifinals
2	Papua New Guinea	4	3	1	9	10	3	3.333	367	328	1.119	Semifinals
3	Fiji	4	2	2	6	5	7	0.714	324	325	0.997	
4	American Samoa	4	1	3	3	4	9	0.444	284	316	0.899	
5	Guam	4	0	4	0	1	12	0.083	254	317	0.801	

Date	Time		Score		Set 1	Set 2	Set 3	Set 4	Set 5	Total	Report
29 Aug	13:00	Fiji	1–3	Papua New Guinea	24–26	34–32	17–25	20–25		95–108	
29 Aug	19:00	American Samoa	3–0	Guam	25–23	25–23	25–21			75–67	
30 Aug	13:00	American Samoa	1–3	Papua New Guinea	25–27	13–25	25–22	16–25		79–99	
31 Aug	13:00	American Samoa	0–3	Fiji	18–25	17–25	20–25			55–75	
31 Aug	19:00	Wallis and Futuna	3–0	Guam	25–14	25–14	25–15			75–43	
1 Sep	19:00	Wallis and Futuna	3–1	Papua New Guinea	25–21	25–19	22–25	25–20		97–85	
2 Sep	12:00	Papua New Guinea	3–0	Guam	25–15	25–23	25–19			75–57	
2 Sep	13:00	Wallis and Futuna	3–0	Fiji	25–20	25–21	25–21			75–62	
3 Sep	13:00	Fiji	3–1	Guam	25–18	26–24	16–25	25–20		92–87	
3 Sep	19:00	Wallis and Futuna	3–0	American Samoa	25–18	25–18	25–18			75–54	

== Knockout stage ==
Semifinals
Tahiti	3
Papua New Guinea	2
Wallis and Futuna	3
New Caledonia	2

Final
Tahiti	0
Wallis and Futuna	3
Third place
Papua New Guinea	3
New Caledonia	1

=== Semifinals ===
Date	Time		Score		Set 1	Set 2	Set 3	Set 4	Set 5	Total	Report
7 Sep	13:00	Tahiti	3–2	Papua New Guinea	23–25	25–23	14–25	25–11	15–11	102–95	
7 Sep	19:00	Wallis and Futuna	3–2	New Caledonia	23–25	25–23	25–21	22–25	15–10	110–104	

=== Seventh place game ===
Date	Time		Score		Set 1	Set 2	Set 3	Set 4	Set 5	Total	Report
8 Sep	11:00	Tuvalu	0–3	American Samoa	16–25	20–25	20–25			56–75	

=== Fifth place game ===
Date	Time		Score		Set 1	Set 2	Set 3	Set 4	Set 5	Total	Report
8 Sep	09:00	Samoa	2–3	Fiji	20–25	25–17	23–25	25–18	11–15	104–100	

=== Bronze medal match ===
Date	Time		Score		Set 1	Set 2	Set 3	Set 4	Set 5	Total	Report
9 Sep	14:00	Papua New Guinea	3–1	New Caledonia	25–18	25–20	22–25	25–20		97–83	

=== Gold medal match ===
Date	Time		Score		Set 1	Set 2	Set 3	Set 4	Set 5	Total	Report
9 Sep	20:00	Tahiti	0–3	Wallis and Futuna	18–25	23–25	22–25			63–75	

== See also ==
- Women's Volleyball at the 2011 Pacific Games
