= Volleyball at the 2019 Pacific Games – Women's tournament =

2019 women's volleyball tournament

The women's tournament of the Volleyball competition at the 2019 Pacific Games was held from July 13–19, 2019 at the National University of Samoa Gymnasium in Apia, Samoa. New Caledonia won the gold medal by defeating Tahiti in the final.

== Participating teams ==
Seven women's teams participated in the tournament:

Pool A

- Samoa
- Solomon Islands
- Wallis and Futuna
- Guam

Pool B

- New Caledonia
- Tahiti
- American Samoa

== Preliminary round ==
=== Pool A ===
Pos	Team	Pld	W	L	Pts	SW	SL	SR	SPW	SPL	SPR	Qualification
1	Wallis and Futuna	3	3	0	8	9	2	4.500	248	177	1.401	Second round
2	Samoa	3	2	1	7	8	3	2.667	242	182	1.330	Second round
3	Guam	3	1	2	3	3	7	0.429	166	238	0.697	5th–7th playoffs
4	Solomon Islands	3	0	3	0	1	9	0.111	173	232	0.746	5th–7th playoffs

Date	Time		Score		Set 1	Set 2	Set 3	Set 4	Set 5	Total	Report
13 Jul	17:00	Wallis and Futuna	3–0	Guam	25–8	25–18	25–17			75–43	
13 Jul	19:00	Samoa	3–0	Solomon Islands	25–11	25–23	25–9			75–43	
15 Jul	14:30	Solomon Islands	1–3	Guam	22–25	20–25	25–7	21–25		88–82	
15 Jul	19:00	Samoa	2–3	Wallis and Futuna	22–25	25–13	25–20	11–25	9–15	92–98	
16 Jul	16:00	Solomon Islands	0–3	Wallis and Futuna	16–25	14–25	12–25			42–75	
16 Jul	19:00	Samoa	3–0	Guam	25–16	25–13	25–12			75–41	

=== Pool B ===
Pos	Team	Pld	W	L	Pts	SW	SL	SR	SPW	SPL	SPR	Qualification
1	New Caledonia	2	2	0	5	6	3	2.000	208	181	1.149	Second round
2	Tahiti	2	1	1	3	4	4	1.000	180	155	1.161	Second round
3	American Samoa	2	0	2	1	3	6	0.500	155	207	0.749	5th–7th playoffs

Date	Time		Score		Set 1	Set 2	Set 3	Set 4	Set 5	Total	Report
13 Jul	14:30	Tahiti	3–1	American Samoa	25–10	18–25	25–16	25–10		93–61	
15 Jul	17:00	New Caledonia	3–2	American Samoa	25–15	25–15	25–27	24–26	15–11	114–94	
16 Jul	17:00	New Caledonia	3–1	Tahiti	25–20	19–25	25–19	25–23		94–87	

== Second round ==
=== Pool C ===
Pos	Team	Pld	W	L	Pts	SW	SL	SR	SPW	SPL	SPR	Qualification
1	New Caledonia	3	3	0	9	9	2	4.500	268	165	1.624	Gold medal match
2	Tahiti	3	2	1	6	7	3	2.333	237	165	1.436	Gold medal match
3	Wallis and Futuna	3	1	2	2	3	8	0.375	131	242	0.541	Bronze medal match
4	Samoa	3	0	3	1	3	9	0.333	208	272	0.765	Bronze medal match

Date	Time		Score		Set 1	Set 2	Set 3	Set 4	Set 5	Total	Report
17 Jul	17:00	Wallis and Futuna	0–3	Tahiti	12–25	9–25	12–25			33–75	
17 Jul	19:00	New Caledonia	3–1	Samoa	25–11	23–25	25–18	26–24		99–78	
18 Jul	17:00	Wallis and Futuna	0–3	New Caledonia	0–25	0–25	0–25			0–75	
18 Jul	19:00	Samoa	0–3	Tahiti	13–21	14–25	11–25			38–71	

== 5th–7th playoffs ==
=== Pool D ===
Pos	Team	Pld	W	L	Pts	SW	SL	SR	SPW	SPL	SPR
1	American Samoa	2	2	0	6	6	0	MAX	150	65	2.308
2	Guam	2	1	1	3	3	4	0.750	129	161	0.801
3	Solomon Islands	2	0	2	0	1	6	0.167	117	170	0.688

Date	Time		Score		Set 1	Set 2	Set 3	Set 4	Set 5	Total	Report
17 Jul	14:30	American Samoa	3–0	Solomon Islands	25–9	25–12	25–10			75–31	
18 Jul	14:30	American Samoa	3–0	Guam	25–11	25–7	25–16			75–34	
19 Jul	17:00	Solomon Islands	1–3	Guam	21–25	20–25	25–20	20–25		86–95	

== Final round ==
=== Bronze medal match ===
Date	Time		Score		Set 1	Set 2	Set 3	Set 4	Set 5	Total	Report
19 Jul	17:00	Wallis and Futuna	0–3	Samoa	21–25	24–26	23–25			68–76	

=== Gold medal match ===
Date	Time		Score		Set 1	Set 2	Set 3	Set 4	Set 5	Total	Report
19 Jul	19:00	New Caledonia	3–2	Tahiti	25–13	18–25	17–25	25–22	15–7	100–92	

== See also ==
- Volleyball at the 2019 Pacific Games – Men's tournament
