= Volleyball at the 2011 Pacific Games – Women's tournament =

The women's tournament of the volleyball competition of the 2011 Pacific Games was held on August 29 – September 9, 2011.

== Participating teams ==
- Fiji
- Guam
- New Caledonia
- Papua New Guinea
- Samoa
- Tahiti
- Tonga
- Tuvalu
- Vanuatu
- Wallis and Futuna

== Preliminary round ==
=== Group A ===
Pos	Team	Pld	W	L	Pts	SW	SL	SR	SPW	SPL	SPR	Qualification
1	New Caledonia	4	4	0	12	12	1	12.000	322	177	1.819	Semifinals
2	Fiji	4	3	1	9	10	3	3.333	292	238	1.227	Semifinals
3	Wallis and Futuna	4	2	2	6	6	8	0.750	279	288	0.969	
4	Guam	4	1	3	3	4	9	0.444	244	315	0.775	
5	Tonga	4	0	4	0	1	12	0.083	206	315	0.654	

Date	Time		Score		Set 1	Set 2	Set 3	Set 4	Set 5	Total	Report
30 Aug	15:00	Guam	1–3	Wallis and Futuna	19–25	13–25	25–23	20–25		77–98	
30 Aug	17:00	Fiji	3–0	Tonga	25–17	25–14	25–17			75–48	
31 Aug	15:00	Fiji	3–0	Wallis and Futuna	25–10	25–20	25–18			75–48	
31 Aug	17:00	New Caledonia	3–0	Tonga	25–14	25–10	25–6			75–30	
1 Sep	15:00	Fiji	3–0	Guam	25–14	25–18	25–13			75–45	
1 Sep	17:00	New Caledonia	3–0	Wallis and Futuna	25–9	25–10	25–16			75–35	
2 Sep	15:00	Wallis and Futuna	3–1	Tonga	23–25	25–12	25–12	25–12		98–61	
2 Sep	17:00	New Caledonia	3–0	Guam	25–8	25–18	25–19			75–45	
3 Sep	15:00	Guam	3–0	Tonga	27–25	25–19	25–23			77–67	
3 Sep	17:00	New Caledonia	3–1	Fiji	22–25	25–20	25–9	25–13		97–67	

=== Group B ===
Pos	Team	Pld	W	L	Pts	SW	SL	SR	SPW	SPL	SPR	Qualification
1	Tahiti	4	4	0	12	12	0	MAX	303	146	2.075	Semifinals
2	Samoa	4	3	1	9	9	3	3.000	276	227	1.216	Semifinals
3	Papua New Guinea	4	2	2	6	6	7	0.857	264	282	0.936	
4	Vanuatu	4	1	3	3	3	9	0.333	231	271	0.852	
5	Tuvalu	4	0	4	0	1	12	0.083	180	328	0.549	

Date	Time		Score		Set 1	Set 2	Set 3	Set 4	Set 5	Total	Report
29 Aug	15:00	Tuvalu	0–3	Vanuatu	9–25	18–25	19–25			46–75	
29 Aug	17:00	Samoa	3–0	Papua New Guinea	25–17	25–12	25–22			75–51	
31 Aug	15:00	Samoa	3–0	Vanuatu	25–18	25–19	25–17			75–54	
31 Aug	17:00	Tahiti	3–0	Papua New Guinea	25–15	25–11	25–12			75–38	
1 Sep	15:00	Samoa	3–0	Tuvalu	25–16	25–18	25–13			75–47	
1 Sep	17:00	Tahiti	3–0	Vanuatu	25–13	25–10	25–15			75–38	
2 Sep	15:00	Vanuatu	0–3	Papua New Guinea	23–25	19–25	22–25			64–75	
2 Sep	17:00	Tahiti	3–0	Tuvalu	25–3	25–11	25–5			75–19	
3 Sep	15:00	Tuvalu	1–3	Papua New Guinea	27–25	13–25	18–25	10–25		68–100	
3 Sep	17:00	Tahiti	3–0	Samoa	25–13	25–16	25–22			75–51	

== Knockout stage ==
Semifinals
New Caledonia	3
Samoa	0
Tahiti	3
Fiji	0

Final
New Caledonia	0
Tahiti	3
Third place
Samoa	3
Fiji	0

=== Semifinals ===
Date	Time		Score		Set 1	Set 2	Set 3	Set 4	Set 5	Total	Report
7 Sep	15:00	New Caledonia	3–0	Samoa	25–11	25–21	25–17			75–49	
7 Sep	17:00	Tahiti	3–0	Fiji	25–18	25–14	25–15			75–47	

=== Seventh place game ===
Date	Time		Score		Set 1	Set 2	Set 3	Set 4	Set 5	Total	Report
6 Sep	11:00	Guam	0–3	Vanuatu	21–25	16–25	11–25			48–75	

=== Fifth place game ===
Date	Time		Score		Set 1	Set 2	Set 3	Set 4	Set 5	Total	Report
6 Sep	09:00	Wallis and Futuna	3–2	Papua New Guinea	13–25	25–17	26–24	23–25	15–9	102–100	

=== Bronze medal match ===
Date	Time		Score		Set 1	Set 2	Set 3	Set 4	Set 5	Total	Report
9 Sep	16:00	Samoa	3–0	Fiji	25–23	25–20	25–21			75–64	

=== Gold medal match ===
Date	Time		Score		Set 1	Set 2	Set 3	Set 4	Set 5	Total	Report
9 Sep	18:00	New Caledonia	0–3	Tahiti	18–25	15–25	10–25			43–75	
