= Volleyball at the 2015 Pacific Games – Men's tournament =

The Men's tournament of the Volleyball competition at the 2015 Pacific Games was held from July 11–18, 2015 at the Taurama Aquatic Centre Courts in Port Moresby. Wallis and Futuna won the gold medal, defeating New Caledonia in the final.

== Participating teams ==
Eleven men's teams participated in the tournament:

Pool A

- Guam
- Kiribati
- Papua New Guinea
- Solomon Islands
- Tahiti

Pool B

- American Samoa
- Fiji
- Nauru
- New Caledonia
- Tuvalu
- Wallis and Futuna

== Preliminary round ==
=== Pool A ===
Pos	Team	Pld	W	L	Pts	SW	SL	SR	SPW	SPL	SPR	Qualification
1	Tahiti	4	4	0	12	12	0	MAX	300	160	1.875	Final round
2	Papua New Guinea	4	3	1	9	9	3	3.000	289	220	1.314	Final round
3	Guam	4	2	2	5	6	8	0.750	269	306	0.879	
4	Kiribati	4	1	3	4	5	9	0.556	250	320	0.781	
5	Solomon Islands	4	0	4	0	0	12	0.000	198	300	0.660	

Date	Time		Score		Set 1	Set 2	Set 3	Set 4	Set 5	Total	Report
11 Jul	15:00	Guam	0–3	Papua New Guinea	16–25	13–25	17–25			46–75	
11 Jul	17:00	Kiribati	3–0	Solomon Islands	25–18	25–18	25–23			75–59	
12 Jul	11:00	Papua New Guinea	3–0	Solomon Islands	25–13	25–16	25–21			75–50	
12 Jul	15:00	Kiribati	0–3	Tahiti	13–25	13–25	7–25			33–75	
13 Jul	09:00	Guam	3–0	Solomon Islands	25–23	25–19	25–21			75–63	
13 Jul	17:00	Papua New Guinea	0–3	Tahiti	22–25	22–25	20–25			64–75	
14 Jul	09:00	Guam	3–2	Kiribati	25–15	25–27	21–25	25–15	15–11	111–93	
14 Jul	11:00	Solomon Islands	0–3	Tahiti	11–25	8–25	7–25			26–75	
15 Jul	13:00	Guam	0–3	Tahiti	13–25	8–25	16–25			37–75	
15 Jul	15:00	Kiribati	0–3	Papua New Guinea	16–25	21–25	12–25			49–75	

=== Pool B ===
Pos	Team	Pld	W	L	Pts	SW	SL	SR	SPW	SPL	SPR	Qualification
1	Wallis and Futuna	5	5	0	15	15	0	MAX	375	264	1.420	Final round
2	New Caledonia	5	4	1	12	12	3	4.000	354	297	1.192	Final round
3	Fiji	5	3	2	9	9	7	1.286	363	340	1.068	
4	American Samoa	5	2	3	6	7	10	0.700	376	385	0.977	
5	Tuvalu	5	1	4	2	4	14	0.286	358	412	0.869	
6	Nauru	5	0	5	1	2	15	0.133	280	408	0.686	

Date	Time		Score		Set 1	Set 2	Set 3	Set 4	Set 5	Total	Report
11 Jul	09:00	Nauru	0–3	New Caledonia	21–25	15–25	4–25			40–75	
11 Jul	11:00	American Samoa	0–3	Wallis and Futuna	21–25	17–25	17–25			55–75	
11 Jul	13:00	Fiji	3–0	Tuvalu	25–16	25–16	25–20			75–52	
12 Jul	09:00	Nauru	2–3	Tuvalu	25–20	25–23	10–25	19–25	9–15	88–108	
12 Jul	11:00	American Samoa	1–3	Fiji	23–25	25–20	17–25	22–25		87–95	
12 Jul	13:00	New Caledonia	0–3	Wallis and Futuna	18–25	22–25	14–25			54–75	
13 Jul	11:00	American Samoa	3–0	Nauru	25–15	25–20	25–19			75–54	
13 Jul	13:00	New Caledonia	3–0	Tuvalu	25–21	25–22	25–18			75–61	
13 Jul	15:00	Fiji	0–3	Wallis and Futuna	18–25	23–25	16–25			57–75	
14 Jul	09:00	Tuvalu	0–3	Wallis and Futuna	14–25	19–25	18–25			51–75	
14 Jul	13:00	Fiji	3–0	Nauru	25–18	25–20	25–13			75–51	
14 Jul	17:00	American Samoa	0–3	New Caledonia	17–25	21–25	22–25			60–75	
15 Jul	09:00	American Samoa	3–1	Tuvalu	25–14	24–26	25–23	25–23		99–86	
15 Jul	11:00	Nauru	0–3	Wallis and Futuna	11–25	16–25	20–25			47–75	
15 Jul	17:00	Fiji	0–3	New Caledonia	22–25	19–25	20–25			61–75	

== Final round ==
Semifinals
17 July
Tahiti	0
New Caledonia	3
17 July
Wallis and Futuna	3
Papua New Guinea	1

Final
18 July
New Caledonia	1
Wallis and Futuna	3
Third place
18 July
Tahiti	3
Papua New Guinea	0

=== Semifinals ===
Date	Time		Score		Set 1	Set 2	Set 3	Set 4	Set 5	Total	Report
17 Jul	15:00	New Caledonia	3–0	Tahiti	25–23	25–16	25–19			75–58	
17 Jul	17:00	Papua New Guinea	1–3	Wallis and Futuna	20–25	21–25	25–16	19–25		85–91	

=== Ninth place game ===
Date	Time		Score		Set 1	Set 2	Set 3	Set 4	Set 5	Total	Report
16 Jul	13:00	Solomon Islands	0–3	Tuvalu	19–25	15–25	19–25			53–75	

=== Seventh place game ===
Date	Time		Score		Set 1	Set 2	Set 3	Set 4	Set 5	Total	Report
16 Jul	15:00	Kiribati	0–3 w	American Samoa							

=== Fifth place game ===
Date	Time		Score		Set 1	Set 2	Set 3	Set 4	Set 5	Total	Report
16 Jul	17:00	Fiji	3–1	Guam	25–11	25–9	25–27	25–18		100–65	

=== Bronze medal match ===
Date	Time		Score		Set 1	Set 2	Set 3	Set 4	Set 5	Total	Report
18 Jul	11:00	Papua New Guinea	0–3	Tahiti	22–25	16–25	22–25			60–75	

=== Gold medal match ===
Date	Time		Score		Set 1	Set 2	Set 3	Set 4	Set 5	Total	Report
18 Jul	15:00	New Caledonia	1–3	Wallis and Futuna	25–20	20–25	23–25	18–25		86–95	

== See also ==
- Volleyball at the 2015 Pacific Games – Women's tournament
