= 2018 FIVB Men's Volleyball World Championship qualification (AVC) =

- Dates: 15 September 2016 – 14 August 2017
- Teams: 23 (from 1 confederation)

The AVC qualification for the 2018 FIVB Men's Volleyball World Championship saw member nations compete for four places at the finals in Italy and Bulgaria.

== Pools composition ==
23 AVC national teams entered qualification. But, Afghanistan and Turkmenistan later withdrew and India later were excluded because of FIVB's suspension of the Volleyball Federation of India.

=== Subzonal round ===
Central Asia decided to hold the subzonal round with the bottom five ranked teams in Central Asia from the FIVB World Ranking as of October 2015. But, Afghanistan and Turkmenistan later withdrew. Rankings are shown in brackets.

Central Asia
~~Afghanistan (79)~~
Maldives (79)
~~Turkmenistan (137)~~
Bangladesh (144)
Kyrgyzstan (NR)

=== Zonal round ===
The top three ranked teams in Central Asia from the FIVB World Ranking as of October 2015 automatically qualified for the zonal round. But, India later were excluded because of FIVB's suspension of the Volleyball Federation of India. Rankings are shown in brackets.

Central Asia	Eastern Asia	Oceania	Southeastern Asia	Western Asia
Kazakhstan (40)	Chinese Taipei (38)	New Zealand (59)	Thailand (47)	Qatar (31)
~~India (42)~~	Macau (144)	Fiji (144)	Myanmar (79)	United Arab Emirates (144)
Pakistan (50)		Tonga (144)	Vietnam (79)	
Kyrgyzstan (Central Subzonal 1st)				

=== Final round ===
The top five ranked teams from the FIVB World Ranking as of October 2015 automatically qualified for the final round. The top four ranked teams seeded by serpentine system, while the other six teams were drawn in Bangkok, Thailand on 19 March 2017. Rankings are shown in brackets.

Pool A	Pool B
Iran (8)	Australia (13)
China (19)	Japan (14)
South Korea (23)	Chinese Taipei (38)
Qatar (31)	Thailand (47)
Kazakhstan (Central Zonal 1st)	New Zealand (59)

== Pool standing procedure ==
1. Number of matches won
2. Match points
3. Sets ratio
4. Points ratio
5. If the tie continues as per the point ratio between two teams, the priority will be given to the team which won the last match between them. When the tie in points ratio is between three or more teams, a new classification of these teams in the terms of points 1, 2 and 3 will be made taking into consideration only the matches in which they were opposed to each other.

Match won 3–0 or 3–1: 3 match points for the winner, 0 match points for the loser
Match won 3–2: 2 match points for the winner, 1 match point for the loser

== Subzonal round ==
- The winners qualified for the zonal round.

=== Central Asia ===
- Venue: Gazprom Sports and Recreation Center, Cholpon-Ata, Kyrgyzstan
- Dates: 15–17 September 2016
- All times are Kyrgyzstan Time (UTC+06:00).

Pos	Team	Pld	W	L	Pts	SW	SL	SR	SPW	SPL	SPR	Qualification
1	Kyrgyzstan	2	2	0	6	6	0	MAX	151	112	1.348	Zonal round
2	Bangladesh	2	1	1	3	3	4	0.750	152	168	0.905	
3	Maldives	2	0	2	0	1	6	0.167	145	168	0.863	

Date	Time		Score		Set 1	Set 2	Set 3	Set 4	Set 5	Total	Report
15 Sep	17:30	Kyrgyzstan	3–0	Bangladesh	25–19	25–16	26–24			76–59	Result
16 Sep	17:00	Maldives	1–3	Bangladesh	26–28	21–25	25–15	20–25		92–93	Result
17 Sep	17:00	Kyrgyzstan	3–0	Maldives	25–16	25–18	25–19			75–53	Result

== Zonal round ==
- The winners in each pool qualified for the final round.

=== Central Asia ===
- Venue: Gazprom Sports and Recreation Center, Bishkek, Kyrgyzstan
- Dates: 26–28 May 2017
- All times are Kyrgyzstan Time (UTC+06:00).

Pos	Team	Pld	W	L	Pts	SW	SL	SR	SPW	SPL	SPR	Qualification
1	Kazakhstan	2	2	0	5	6	3	2.000	202	190	1.063	Final round
2	Pakistan	2	1	1	3	5	5	1.000	210	204	1.029	
3	Kyrgyzstan	2	0	2	1	3	6	0.500	183	201	0.910	

Date	Time		Score		Set 1	Set 2	Set 3	Set 4	Set 5	Total	Report
26 May	19:00	Pakistan	3–2	Kyrgyzstan	25–18	25–18	15–25	22–25	16–14	103–100	Result
27 May	19:00	Kazakhstan	3–2	Pakistan	21–25	25–22	25–22	18–25	15–13	104–107	Result
28 May	19:00	Kyrgyzstan	1–3	Kazakhstan	25–27	25–21	19–25	14–25		83–98	Result

=== Eastern Asia ===
- Eastern Asia decided to replace the tournament with the FIVB World Ranking as of 22 August 2016. Rankings are shown in brackets.

Rank	Team
1	Chinese Taipei (33)
2	Macau (137)

=== Oceania ===
- Venue: Vodafone Arena, Suva, Fiji
- Dates: 27–29 October 2016
- All times are Fiji Standard Time (UTC+12:00).

Pos	Team	Pld	W	L	Pts	SW	SL	SR	SPW	SPL	SPR	Qualification
1	New Zealand	2	2	0	6	6	1	6.000	177	149	1.188	Final round
2	Fiji	2	1	1	3	4	3	1.333	158	149	1.060	
3	Tonga	2	0	2	0	0	6	0.000	116	153	0.758	

Date	Time		Score		Set 1	Set 2	Set 3	Set 4	Set 5	Total	Report
27 Oct	19:30	New Zealand	3–0	Tonga	28–26	25–19	25–21			78–66	
28 Oct	19:30	Fiji	3–0	Tonga	25–18	25–18	25–14			75–50	
29 Oct	19:30	Fiji	1–3	New Zealand	24–26	25–23	14–25	20–25		83–99	Result

=== Southeastern Asia ===
- Venue: Nakhon Pathom Gymnasium, Nakhon Pathom, Thailand
- Dates: 7–9 October 2016
- All times are Indochina Time (UTC+07:00).

Pos	Team	Pld	W	L	Pts	SW	SL	SR	SPW	SPL	SPR	Qualification
1	Thailand	2	2	0	6	6	1	6.000	176	151	1.166	Final round
2	Vietnam	2	1	1	3	4	3	1.333	162	150	1.080	
3	Myanmar	2	0	2	0	0	6	0.000	115	152	0.757	

Date	Time		Score		Set 1	Set 2	Set 3	Set 4	Set 5	Total	Report
7 Oct	18:00	Thailand	3–0	Myanmar	27–25	25–17	25–22			77–64	Result
8 Oct	18:00	Myanmar	0–3	Vietnam	20–25	13–25	18–25			51–75	Result
9 Oct	18:00	Thailand	3–1	Vietnam	24–26	25–18	25–23	25–20		99–87	Result

=== Western Asia ===
- Western Asia decided to replace the tournament with the FIVB World Ranking as of 22 August 2016. Rankings are shown in brackets.

Rank	Team
1	Qatar (36)
2	United Arab Emirates (137)

== Final round ==
- The top two teams in each pool qualified for the 2018 World Championship.

=== Pool A ===
- Venue: Rezazadeh Stadium, Ardabil, Iran
- Dates: 10–14 August 2017
- All times are Iran Daylight Time (UTC+04:30).

Pos	Team	Pld	W	L	Pts	SW	SL	SR	SPW	SPL	SPR	Qualification
1	Iran	4	4	0	12	12	0	MAX	306	232	1.319	2018 World Championship
2	China	4	3	1	9	9	4	2.250	315	289	1.090	2018 World Championship
3	Qatar	4	2	2	5	6	8	0.750	301	308	0.977	
4	South Korea	4	1	3	4	5	10	0.500	319	335	0.952	
5	Kazakhstan	4	0	4	0	2	12	0.167	273	350	0.780	

Date	Time		Score		Set 1	Set 2	Set 3	Set 4	Set 5	Total	Report
10 Aug	15:30	South Korea	2–3	Qatar	25–21	25–15	21–25	18–25	13–15	102–101	P2
10 Aug	18:00	China	3–1	Kazakhstan	25–15	25–21	22–25	25–23		97–84	P2
11 Aug	15:30	Qatar	0–3	China	22–25	21–25	22–25			65–75	P2
11 Aug	18:00	Iran	3–0	South Korea	25–10	27–25	25–18			77–53	P2
12 Aug	15:30	Kazakhstan	0–3	Qatar	21–25	17–25	18–25			56–75	P2
12 Aug	18:00	Iran	3–0	China	25–21	29–27	25–20			79–68	P2
13 Aug	15:30	South Korea	0–3	China	18–25	20–25	23–25			61–75	P2
13 Aug	18:00	Iran	3–0	Kazakhstan	25–18	25–17	25–16			75–51	P2
14 Aug	15:30	South Korea	3–1	Kazakhstan	25–18	25–12	28–30	25–22		103–82	P2
14 Aug	18:10	Iran	3–0	Qatar	25–22	25–19	25–19			75–60	P2

=== Pool B ===
- Venue: AIS Arena, Canberra, Australia
- Dates: 12–16 July 2017
- All times are Australian Eastern Standard Time (UTC+10:00).

Pos	Team	Pld	W	L	Pts	SW	SL	SR	SPW	SPL	SPR	Qualification
1	Japan	4	4	0	11	12	2	6.000	335	239	1.402	2018 World Championship
2	Australia	4	3	1	10	11	3	3.667	324	287	1.129	2018 World Championship
3	Chinese Taipei	4	2	2	6	6	6	1.000	276	271	1.018	
4	Thailand	4	1	3	3	3	10	0.300	273	307	0.889	
5	New Zealand	4	0	4	0	1	12	0.083	221	325	0.680	

Date	Time		Score		Set 1	Set 2	Set 3	Set 4	Set 5	Total	Report
12 Jul	17:00	Chinese Taipei	0–3	Japan	19–25	19–25	19–25			57–75	P2
12 Jul	20:10	Australia	3–0	New Zealand	25–12	25–18	25–18			75–48	P2
13 Jul	17:00	Japan	3–0	New Zealand	25–11	25–16	25–10			75–37	P2
13 Jul	20:10	Australia	3–0	Thailand	25–20	25–21	25–19			75–60	P2
14 Jul	11:00	Chinese Taipei	3–0	New Zealand	25–17	25–21	25–16			75–54	P2
14 Jul	14:00	Japan	3–0	Thailand	25–12	25–18	25–16			75–46	P2
15 Jul	17:00	Chinese Taipei	3–0	Thailand	25–22	25–23	25–22			75–67	P2
15 Jul	20:00	Australia	2–3	Japan	22–25	25–23	14–25	25–22	13–15	99–110	P2
16 Jul	14:00	Thailand	3–1	New Zealand	25–20	25–16	25–27	25–19		100–82	P2
16 Jul	17:10	Australia	3–0	Chinese Taipei	25–23	25–23	25–23			75–69	P2
