= 2018 FIVB Men's Volleyball World Championship qualification (CEV) =

The CEV qualification for the 2018 FIVB Men's Volleyball World Championship saw member nations compete for seven places at the finals in Italy and Bulgaria.

== Pools composition ==
39 CEV national teams entered qualification.

=== First round ===
7 Small Countries Division teams participated in the first round. The first round also acted as the 2017 European Championship Small Countries Division qualification round. Teams were seeded following the serpentine system according to their final ranking of 2015 European Championship Small Countries Division. But, Northern Ireland and Iceland were switched between the pools as Iceland were drawn as the 2nd hosts alongside Luxembourg who applied to hosts. Rankings are shown in brackets.

Pool A	Pool B
Luxembourg (1)	Cyprus (2)
Faroe Islands (4)	Scotland (3)
Northern Ireland (6)	Iceland (5)
	Andorra (7)

=== Second round ===
The six hosts were drawn as heads of series in one of the six pools (from left to right, A–B–C–D–E–F). The remaining participating teams were grouped in five sub-groups – each one including six teams – according to the CEV National Team Ranking as of 19 October 2015 – i.e. when National Federations registered for participation in the World Championship qualification – and drawn accordingly into one of the six pools (from left to right, A–B–C–D–E–F). Rankings are shown in brackets except hosts. The pools were confirmed on 26 October 2016.

Pool A	Pool B	Pool C	Pool D	Pool E	Pool F
France (Hosts)	Netherlands (Hosts)	Slovenia (Hosts)	Estonia (Hosts)	Croatia (Hosts)	Czech Republic (Hosts)
Germany (4)	Slovakia (11)	Belgium (9)	Russia (2)	Serbia (6)	Finland (8)
Turkey (14)	Greece (18)	Portugal (15)	Montenegro (21)	Belarus (20)	Spain (17)
Ukraine (23)	Austria (28)	Latvia (25)	Romania (26)	Denmark (24)	Sweden (27)
Azerbaijan (33)	Luxembourg (31)	Israel (29)	Hungary (30)	Switzerland (34)	Cyprus (31)
Iceland (41)	Moldova (35)	Georgia (41)	Kosovo (–)	Norway (36)	Northern Ireland (43)

=== Third round ===
Pool G
Second Round Pool A 2nd
Second Round Pool B 2nd
Second Round Pool C 2nd
Second Round Pool D 2nd
Second Round Pool E 2nd
Second Round Pool F 2nd

== Pool standing procedure ==
1. Number of matches won
2. Match points
3. Sets ratio
4. Points ratio
5. If the tie continues as per the point ratio between two teams, the priority will be given to the team which won the last match between them. When the tie in points ratio is between three or more teams, a new classification of these teams in the terms of points 1, 2 and 3 will be made taking into consideration only the matches in which they were opposed to each other.

Match won 3–0 or 3–1: 3 match points for the winner, 0 match points for the loser
Match won 3–2: 2 match points for the winner, 1 match point for the loser

== First round ==
- The top two teams in each pool qualified for the second round.

=== Pool A ===
- Venue: d'Coque Gymnase, Luxembourg City, Luxembourg
- Dates: 13–15 May 2016
- All times are Central European Summer Time (UTC+02:00).

Pos	Team	Pld	W	L	Pts	SW	SL	SR	SPW	SPL	SPR	Qualification
1	Luxembourg	2	2	0	6	6	0	MAX	150	89	1.685	Second round
2	Northern Ireland	2	1	1	3	3	4	0.750	151	173	0.873	Second round
3	Faroe Islands	2	0	2	0	1	6	0.167	140	179	0.782	

Date	Time		Score		Set 1	Set 2	Set 3	Set 4	Set 5	Total	Report
13 May	19:00	Northern Ireland	3–1	Faroe Islands	25–21	24–26	29–27	26–24		104–98	Report
14 May	19:00	Luxembourg	3–0	Northern Ireland	25–14	25–13	25–20			75–47	Report
15 May	17:00	Faroe Islands	0–3	Luxembourg	19–25	13–25	10–25			42–75	Report

=== Pool B ===
- Venue: Laugardalshöll, Reykjavík, Iceland
- Dates: 20–22 May 2016
- All times are Western European Time (UTC±00:00).

Pos	Team	Pld	W	L	Pts	SW	SL	SR	SPW	SPL	SPR	Qualification
1	Cyprus	3	3	0	8	9	3	3.000	280	210	1.333	Second round
2	Iceland	3	2	1	5	7	5	1.400	244	240	1.017	Second round
3	Scotland	3	1	2	5	7	6	1.167	284	270	1.052	
4	Andorra	3	0	3	0	0	9	0.000	137	225	0.609	

Date	Time		Score		Set 1	Set 2	Set 3	Set 4	Set 5	Total	Report
20 May	17:00	Cyprus	3–0	Andorra	25–12	25–12	25–13			75–37	Report
20 May	20:00	Iceland	3–2	Scotland	25–21	15–25	25–18	23–25	15–13	103–102	Report
21 May	15:00	Andorra	0–3	Scotland	17–25	19–25	21–25			57–75	Report
21 May	18:00	Cyprus	3–1	Iceland	25–14	20–25	25–16	25–11		95–66	Report
22 May	15:00	Scotland	2–3	Cyprus	23–25	25–23	25–22	21–25	13–15	107–110	Report
22 May	18:00	Andorra	0–3	Iceland	8–25	18–25	17–25			43–75	Report

== Second round ==
- The winners in each pool qualified for the 2018 World Championship, whereas the runners-up in each pool qualified for the third round.

Qualified for the
Qualified for the Third round

=== Pool A ===
- Venue: Palais des Sports de Gerland, Lyon, France
- Dates: 24–28 May 2017
- All times are Central European Summer Time (UTC+02:00).

Pos	Team	Pld	W	L	Pts	SW	SL	SR	SPW	SPL	SPR	Qualification
1	France	5	5	0	15	15	0	MAX	375	239	1.569	2018 World Championship
2	Germany	5	4	1	12	12	3	4.000	366	291	1.258	Third round
3	Turkey	5	3	2	9	9	6	1.500	341	318	1.072	
4	Ukraine	5	2	3	6	6	9	0.667	303	327	0.927	
5	Azerbaijan	5	1	4	3	3	12	0.250	297	357	0.832	
6	Iceland	5	0	5	0	0	15	0.000	225	375	0.600	

Date	Time		Score		Set 1	Set 2	Set 3	Set 4	Set 5	Total	Report
24 May	15:00	Turkey	3–0	Azerbaijan	25–21	25–21	25–13			75–55	Report
24 May	17:30	Germany	3–0	Ukraine	25–16	25–20	25–19			75–55	Report
24 May	20:30	Iceland	0–3	France	8–25	8–25	14–25			30–75	Report
25 May	15:00	Azerbaijan	0–3	Germany	27–29	18–25	18–25			63–79	Report
25 May	17:30	Iceland	0–3	Turkey	18–25	23–25	17–25			58–75	Report
25 May	20:30	France	3–0	Ukraine	25–20	25–8	25–15			75–43	Report
26 May	15:00	Germany	3–0	Iceland	25–12	25–12	25–14			75–38	Report
26 May	17:30	Ukraine	3–0	Azerbaijan	25–13	25–23	25–20			75–56	Report
26 May	20:30	Turkey	0–3	France	21–25	18–25	17–25			56–75	Report
27 May	15:00	Iceland	0–3	Ukraine	12–25	19–25	15–25			46–75	Report
27 May	17:30	France	3–0	Azerbaijan	25–16	25–17	25–15			75–48	Report
27 May	20:30	Turkey	0–3	Germany	17–25	20–25	23–25			60–75	Report
28 May	15:00	Azerbaijan	3–0	Iceland	25–16	25–17	25–20			75–53	Report
28 May	17:30	Ukraine	0–3	Turkey	16–25	19–25	20–25			55–75	Report
28 May	20:30	Germany	0–3	France	22–25	20–25	20–25			62–75	Report

=== Pool B ===
- Dates: 23–28 May 2017
- All times are Central European Summer Time (UTC+02:00).

Pos	Team	Pld	W	L	Pts	SW	SL	SR	SPW	SPL	SPR	Qualification
1	Netherlands	5	5	0	13	15	5	3.000	477	382	1.249	2018 World Championship
2	Slovakia	5	3	2	9	12	8	1.500	463	441	1.050	Third round
3	Greece	5	3	2	9	11	9	1.222	441	452	0.976	
4	Austria	5	2	3	8	11	10	1.100	487	482	1.010	
5	Moldova	5	2	3	5	7	12	0.583	408	457	0.893	
6	Luxembourg	5	0	5	1	3	15	0.200	373	435	0.857	

- Venue: Topsportcentrum de Koog, Koog aan de Zaan, Netherlands

Date	Time		Score		Set 1	Set 2	Set 3	Set 4	Set 5	Total	Report
23 May	15:00	Slovakia	1–3	Austria	25–27	24–26	25–19	20–25		94–97	Report
23 May	17:30	Moldova	1–3	Greece	25–20	20–25	17–25	26–28		88–98	Report
23 May	20:00	Luxembourg	1–3	Netherlands	25–22	16–25	20–25	15–25		76–97	Report
24 May	15:00	Austria	2–3	Greece	24–26	25–27	25–16	25–23	13–15	112–107	Report
24 May	17:30	Slovakia	3–0	Luxembourg	25–17	27–25	26–24			78–66	Report
24 May	20:00	Netherlands	3–0	Moldova	25–15	25–13	25–16			75–44	Report
25 May	15:00	Luxembourg	0–3	Austria	24–26	23–25	20–25			67–76	Report
25 May	17:30	Moldova	0–3	Slovakia	9–25	31–33	23–25			63–83	Report
25 May	20:00	Greece	0–3	Netherlands	13–25	30–32	16–25			59–82	Report

- Venue: Omnisport Apeldoorn Volleyball Hall, Apeldoorn, Netherlands

Date	Time		Score		Set 1	Set 2	Set 3	Set 4	Set 5	Total	Report
27 May	15:00	Luxembourg	2–3	Moldova	23–25	25–22	16–25	25–22	12–15	101–109	Report
27 May	17:30	Austria	2–3	Netherlands	22–25	25–22	25–23	22–25	8–15	102–110	Report
27 May	20:00	Slovakia	3–2	Greece	22–25	20–25	25–21	25–19	15–12	107–102	Report
28 May	14:30	Moldova	3–1	Austria	22–25	31–29	25–22	26–24		104–100	Report
28 May	17:00	Netherlands	3–2	Slovakia	25–27	26–24	22–25	25–16	15–9	113–101	Report
28 May	19:30	Greece	3–0	Luxembourg	25–19	25–23	25–21			75–63	Report

=== Pool C ===
- Venue: Arena Stožice, Ljubljana, Slovenia
- Dates: 24–28 May 2017
- All times are Central European Summer Time (UTC+02:00).

Pos	Team	Pld	W	L	Pts	SW	SL	SR	SPW	SPL	SPR	Qualification
1	Slovenia	5	5	0	15	15	1	15.000	408	282	1.447	2018 World Championship
2	Belgium	5	4	1	12	13	3	4.333	399	304	1.313	Third round
3	Portugal	5	3	2	9	9	8	1.125	389	369	1.054	
4	Israel	5	2	3	5	7	11	0.636	349	410	0.851	
5	Latvia	5	1	4	4	6	12	0.500	377	399	0.945	
6	Georgia	5	0	5	0	0	15	0.000	217	375	0.579	

Date	Time		Score		Set 1	Set 2	Set 3	Set 4	Set 5	Total	Report
24 May	15:00	Portugal	0–3	Belgium	17–25	16–25	16–25			49–75	Report
24 May	17:30	Slovenia	3–0	Georgia	25–12	25–11	25–12			75–35	Report
24 May	20:00	Israel	3–2	Latvia	19–25	25–20	24–26	25–22	16–14	109–107	Report
25 May	15:00	Belgium	3–0	Georgia	25–18	25–11	25–10			75–39	Report
25 May	17:30	Latvia	0–3	Slovenia	14–25	14–25	19–25			47–75	Report
25 May	20:00	Portugal	3–1	Israel	25–19	25–21	24–26	25–12		99–78	Report
26 May	15:00	Georgia	0–3	Latvia	9–25	17–25	14–25			40–75	Report
26 May	17:30	Slovenia	3–0	Portugal	25–21	25–20	27–25			77–66	Report
26 May	20:00	Israel	0–3	Belgium	13–25	18–25	21–25			52–75	Report
27 May	15:00	Portugal	3–0	Georgia	25–19	25–16	25–14			75–49	Report
27 May	17:30	Israel	0–3	Slovenia	11–25	14–25	10–25			35–75	Report
27 May	20:00	Belgium	3–0	Latvia	25–16	25–21	25–21			75–58	Report
28 May	15:00	Georgia	0–3	Israel	13–25	22–25	19–25			54–75	Report
28 May	17:30	Slovenia	3–1	Belgium	28–30	26–24	27–25	25–20		106–99	Report
28 May	20:00	Latvia	1–3	Portugal	24–26	25–23	24–26	17–25		90–100	Report

=== Pool D ===
- Venue: Kalevi Spordihall, Tallinn, Estonia
- Dates: 24–28 May 2017
- All times are Eastern European Summer Time (UTC+03:00).

Pos	Team	Pld	W	L	Pts	SW	SL	SR	SPW	SPL	SPR	Qualification
1	Russia	5	5	0	15	15	1	15.000	396	279	1.419	2018 World Championship
2	Estonia	5	4	1	12	13	5	2.600	427	353	1.210	Third round
3	Romania	5	3	2	9	10	8	1.250	406	397	1.023	
4	Montenegro	5	2	3	5	7	11	0.636	411	386	1.065	
5	Hungary	5	1	4	4	6	12	0.500	367	401	0.915	
6	Kosovo	5	0	5	0	1	15	0.067	205	396	0.518	

Date	Time		Score		Set 1	Set 2	Set 3	Set 4	Set 5	Total	Report
24 May	15:00	Montenegro	0–3	Russia	21–25	22–25	18–25			61–75	Report
24 May	18:00	Estonia	3–1	Romania	25–15	25–21	22–25	25–16		97–77	Report
24 May	20:30	Hungary	3–0	Kosovo	25–13	25–17	25–9			75–39	Report
25 May	15:00	Russia	3–0	Romania	25–18	25–20	25–21			75–59	Report
25 May	18:00	Kosovo	0–3	Estonia	13–25	15–25	7–25			35–75	Report
25 May	20:30	Montenegro	3–2	Hungary	23–25	25–13	25–23	26–28	15–10	114–99	Report
26 May	15:00	Romania	3–1	Kosovo	25–12	25–15	21–25	25–15		96–67	Report
26 May	18:00	Estonia	3–0	Montenegro	25–23	27–25	25–23			77–71	Report
26 May	20:30	Hungary	0–3	Russia	18–25	17–25	16–25			51–75	Report
27 May	15:00	Montenegro	1–3	Romania	23–25	25–21	21–25	21–25		90–96	Report
27 May	18:00	Hungary	1–3	Estonia	25–20	15–25	20–25	14–25		74–95	Report
27 May	20:30	Russia	3–0	Kosovo	25–8	25–8	25–9			75–25	Report
28 May	15:00	Romania	3–0	Hungary	25–19	26–24	27–25			78–68	Report
28 May	17:30	Kosovo	0–3	Montenegro	15–25	9–25	15–25			39–75	Report
28 May	20:30	Estonia	1–3	Russia	25–21	21–25	18–25	19–25		83–96	Report

=== Pool E ===
- Venue: Dom odbojke Bojan Stranic, Zagreb, Croatia
- Dates: 24–28 May 2017
- All times are Central European Summer Time (UTC+02:00).

Pos	Team	Pld	W	L	Pts	SW	SL	SR	SPW	SPL	SPR	Qualification
1	Serbia	5	5	0	15	15	0	MAX	384	277	1.386	2018 World Championship
2	Belarus	5	4	1	11	12	8	1.500	460	443	1.038	Third round
3	Switzerland	5	3	2	9	11	10	1.100	455	463	0.983	
4	Denmark	5	2	3	5	8	12	0.667	466	469	0.994	
5	Croatia	5	1	4	4	7	13	0.538	446	486	0.918	
6	Norway	5	0	5	1	5	15	0.333	396	469	0.844	

Date	Time		Score		Set 1	Set 2	Set 3	Set 4	Set 5	Total	Report
24 May	15:00	Denmark	1–3	Switzerland	23–25	25–19	20–25	18–25		86–94	Report
24 May	17:30	Serbia	3–0	Belarus	25–17	25–22	25–15			75–54	Report
24 May	20:00	Norway	1–3	Croatia	23–25	25–22	19–25	15–25		82–97	Report
25 May	15:00	Denmark	0–3	Serbia	23–25	32–34	19–25			74–84	Report
25 May	17:30	Belarus	3–1	Norway	25–19	25–20	20–25	25–22		95–86	Report
25 May	20:00	Switzerland	3–1	Croatia	26–28	25–20	25–18	25–23		101–89	Report
26 May	15:00	Norway	1–3	Denmark	21–25	25–18	16–25	23–25		85–93	Report
26 May	17:30	Serbia	3–0	Switzerland	25–15	25–18	25–18			75–51	Report
26 May	20:00	Croatia	1–3	Belarus	14–25	36–34	16–25	22–25		88–109	Report
27 May	15:00	Serbia	3–0	Norway	25–12	25–14	25–12			75–38	Report
27 May	17:30	Denmark	3–2	Croatia	25–27	25–22	29–27	25–27	15–9	119–112	Report
27 May	20:00	Switzerland	2–3	Belarus	19–25	21–25	25–22	25–21	10–15	100–108	Report
28 May	15:00	Norway	2–3	Switzerland	26–24	21–25	25–20	23–25	10–15	105–109	Report
28 May	17:30	Croatia	0–3	Serbia	23–25	16–25	21–25			60–75	Report
28 May	20:00	Belarus	3–1	Denmark	25–23	25–23	19–25	25–23		94–94	Report

=== Pool F ===
- Venue: KV Arena Ball Sports Hall, Karlovy Vary, Czech Republic
- Dates: 24–28 May 2017
- All times are Central European Summer Time (UTC+02:00).

Pos	Team	Pld	W	L	Pts	SW	SL	SR	SPW	SPL	SPR	Qualification
1	Finland	5	5	0	15	15	2	7.500	419	288	1.455	2018 World Championship
2	Spain	5	4	1	10	13	7	1.857	450	396	1.136	Third round
3	Czech Republic	5	3	2	10	12	6	2.000	405	342	1.184	
4	Sweden	5	2	3	6	8	11	0.727	392	418	0.938	
5	Cyprus	5	1	4	4	5	12	0.417	340	395	0.861	
6	Northern Ireland	5	0	5	0	0	15	0.000	208	375	0.555	

Date	Time		Score		Set 1	Set 2	Set 3	Set 4	Set 5	Total	Report
24 May	15:00	Finland	3–0	Cyprus	25–14	25–13	25–21			75–48	Report
24 May	17:30	Northern Ireland	0–3	Czech Republic	16–25	7–25	6–25			29–75	Report
24 May	20:00	Sweden	2–3	Spain	19–25	25–22	25–21	16–25	12–15	97–108	Report
25 May	15:00	Finland	3–0	Northern Ireland	25–8	25–8	25–9			75–25	Report
25 May	17:30	Czech Republic	3–0	Sweden	25–19	25–16	25–20			75–55	Report
25 May	20:00	Cyprus	0–3	Spain	17–25	14–25	22–25			53–75	Report
26 May	15:00	Sweden	0–3	Finland	14–25	19–25	21–25			54–75	Report
26 May	17:30	Northern Ireland	0–3	Cyprus	20–25	16–25	22–25			58–75	Report
26 May	20:00	Spain	3–2	Czech Republic	25–22	20–25	22–25	25–21	15–10	107–103	Report
27 May	15:00	Northern Ireland	0–3	Sweden	15–25	13–25	21–25			49–75	Report
27 May	17:30	Cyprus	0–3	Czech Republic	24–26	12–25	17–25			53–76	Report
27 May	20:00	Finland	3–1	Spain	25–19	21–25	25–19	25–22		96–85	Report
28 May	15:00	Sweden	3–2	Cyprus	19–25	25–27	27–25	25–21	15–13	111–111	Report
28 May	17:30	Spain	3–0	Northern Ireland	25–15	25–20	25–12			75–47	Report
28 May	20:00	Czech Republic	1–3	Finland	23–25	14–25	25–23	14–25		76–98	Report

== Third round ==
- The winners qualified for the 2018 World Championship.

=== Pool G ===
- Venue: Sportcampus Lange Munte, Kortrijk, Belgium
- Dates: 19–23 July 2017
- All times are Central European Summer Time (UTC+02:00).

Pos	Team	Pld	W	L	Pts	SW	SL	SR	SPW	SPL	SPR	Qualification
1	Belgium	5	5	0	15	15	1	15.000	400	288	1.389	2018 World Championship
2	Estonia	5	3	2	10	12	7	1.714	429	408	1.051	
3	Germany	5	3	2	8	10	8	1.250	397	415	0.957	
4	Slovakia	5	2	3	6	6	10	0.600	349	390	0.895	
5	Spain	5	2	3	5	7	12	0.583	425	441	0.964	
6	Belarus	5	0	5	1	3	15	0.200	375	433	0.866	

Date	Time		Score		Set 1	Set 2	Set 3	Set 4	Set 5	Total	Report
19 Jul	15:00	Belgium	3–0	Slovakia	26–24	25–13	25–15			76–52	Report
19 Jul	17:30	Spain	3–1	Germany	25–17	24–26	25–22	25–19		99–84	Report
19 Jul	20:00	Belarus	1–3	Estonia	20–25	22–25	25–21	23–25		90–96	Report
20 Jul	15:00	Slovakia	0–3	Germany	23–25	21–25	24–26			68–76	Report
20 Jul	17:30	Belgium	3–0	Belarus	25–18	25–12	25–17			75–47	Report
20 Jul	20:00	Estonia	3–0	Spain	25–22	25–20	25–19			75–61	Report
21 Jul	15:00	Belarus	0–3	Slovakia	21–25	24–26	21–25			66–76	Report
21 Jul	17:30	Spain	0–3	Belgium	25–27	20–25	16–25			61–77	Report
21 Jul	20:00	Germany	3–2	Estonia	25–21	25–22	21–25	23–25	15–11	109–104	Report
22 Jul	15:00	Belarus	2–3	Spain	25–20	18–25	25–22	22–25	13–15	103–107	Report
22 Jul	17:30	Slovakia	0–3	Estonia	14–25	17–25	20–25			51–75	Report
22 Jul	20:10	Belgium	3–0	Germany	25–16	25–16	25–17			75–49	Report
23 Jul	15:30	Spain	1–3	Slovakia	19–25	25–20	29–31	24–26		97–102	Report
23 Jul	18:00	Germany	3–0	Belarus	29–27	25–20	25–22			79–69	Report
23 Jul	20:40	Estonia	1–3	Belgium	25–22	20–25	19–25	15–25		79–97	Report
