= 2018 FIVB Men's Volleyball World Championship qualification (NORCECA) =

The NORCECA qualification for the 2018 FIVB Men's Volleyball World Championship saw member nations compete for five places at the finals in Italy and Bulgaria. The top three teams from the 2017 Men's NORCECA Volleyball Championship, plus two teams from the final four qualified for the 2018 World Championship. Therefore, the first two rounds of the 2018 World Championship qualification also acted as qualifiers for the 2017 NORCECA Championship.

Originally the 2017 NORCECA Championship was the only competition from the area to offer the 2018 World Championship qualification quota, but due to the pass of hurricanes Irma and Maria for the Caribbean sea, Cuba and Puerto Rico were unable to compete, NORCECA authorities decided to make the final four tournament - Cuba, Puerto Rico and the 4th and 5th placed teams of the 2017 NORCECA Championship.

== Pools composition ==
41 NORCECA national teams entered qualification. The top six ranked teams from the NORCECA Ranking as of 1 January 2016 (United States, Canada, Cuba, Puerto Rico, Mexico and Costa Rica) automatically qualified for the 2017 NORCECA Championship or the final four. But, Bonaire and Saba later withdrew.

=== First round ===
==== CAZOVA ====
14 CAZOVA national teams entered qualification. The top two ranked teams from CAZOVA did not compete in the first round and automatically qualified for the second round. Teams ranked 3–14 from CAZOVA were seeded following the serpentine system according to their position in the NORCECA Ranking as of 1 January 2016. Pools composition was determined by taking into consideration – as far as possible – the geographical location of the various countries. But, Bonaire later withdrew. Rankings are shown in brackets.

Pool A	Pool B	Pool C
Bahamas (14)	Suriname (16)	Curaçao (20)
Aruba (27)	Jamaica (23)	Haiti (24)
Martinique (28)	Guadeloupe (29)	U.S. Virgin Islands (34)
~~Bonaire (40)~~	Turks and Caicos Islands (39)	Cayman Islands (36)

==== ECVA ====
14 ECVA national teams entered qualification. The top two ranked teams from ECVA did not compete in the first round and automatically qualified for the second round. Teams ranked 3–14 from ECVA were seeded following the serpentine system according to their position in the NORCECA Ranking as of 1 January 2016. Pools composition was determined by taking into consideration – as far as possible – the geographical location of the various countries. But, Saba later withdrew. Rankings are shown in brackets.

Pool A	Pool B	Pool C
Antigua and Barbuda (19)	Saint Vincent and the Grenadines (18)	Saint Martin (22)
Anguilla (31)	Saint Kitts and Nevis (30)	Sint Maarten (25)
Sint Eustatius (37)	Grenada (33)	British Virgin Islands (32)
Montserrat (38)	Bermuda (35)	~~Saba (41)~~

==== AFECAVOL ====
7 AFECAVOL national teams entered qualification. One round was held with a Round-robin tournament of all 7 teams. NORCECA Ranking as of 1 January 2016 are shown in brackets.

AFECAVOL
Honduras (8)
Dominican Republic (9)
Guatemala (10)
Panama (13)
Nicaragua (17)
El Salvador (21)
Belize (26)

=== Second round ===
==== CAZOVA ====
NORCECA Ranking as of 1 January 2016 are shown in brackets.

Pool D	Pool E
Trinidad and Tobago (7)	Barbados (11)
Ranked 4th in CAZOVA	Ranked 3rd in CAZOVA
Ranked 5th in CAZOVA	Ranked 6th in CAZOVA
Ranked 8th in CAZOVA	Ranked 7th in CAZOVA

==== ECVA ====
NORCECA Ranking as of 1 January 2016 are shown in brackets.

Pool D	Pool E
Saint Lucia (12)	Dominica (15)
2nd best result in ECVA First Round	Best result in ECVA First Round
3rd best result in ECVA First Round	4th best result in ECVA First Round
6th best result in ECVA First Round	5th best result in ECVA First Round

=== Final round ===
Final four
Cuba
Puerto Rico
2017 NORCECA Championship 4th
2017 NORCECA Championship 5th

== Pool standing procedure ==
1. Number of matches won
2. Match points
3. Sets ratio
4. Points ratio
5. If the tie continues as per the point ratio between two teams, the priority will be given to the team which won the last match between them. When the tie in points ratio is between three or more teams, a new classification of these teams in the terms of points 1, 2 and 3 will be made taking into consideration only the matches in which they were opposed to each other.

Match won 3–0: 5 match points for the winner, 0 match points for the loser
Match won 3–1: 4 match points for the winner, 1 match point for the loser
Match won 3–2: 3 match points for the winner, 2 match points for the loser

== First round ==
- The top two teams in each CAZOVA and ECVA pool qualified for the second round, whereas the top two teams from AFECAVOL qualified for the 2017 NORCECA Championship.

=== CAZOVA Pool A ===
- Venue: Palais des Sports de Rivière-Salée, Rivière-Salée, Martinique
- Dates: 22–23 October 2016
- All times are Atlantic Standard Time (UTC−04:00).

Pos	Team	Pld	W	L	Pts	SPW	SPL	SPR	SW	SL	SR	Qualification
1	Bahamas	2	2	0	8	189	160	1.181	6	2	3.000	Second round
2	Martinique	2	1	1	7	188	176	1.068	5	3	1.667	Second round
3	Aruba	2	0	2	0	109	150	0.727	0	6	0.000	

Date	Time		Score		Set 1	Set 2	Set 3	Set 4	Set 5	Total	Report
22 Oct	17:35	Martinique	2–3	Bahamas	23–25	25–21	27–25	22–25	16–18	113–114	P2 P3
23 Oct	10:25	Bahamas	3–0	Aruba	25–20	25–12	25–15			75–47	P2 P3
23 Oct	19:00	Martinique	3–0	Aruba	25–19	25–22	25–21			75–62	P2 P3

=== CAZOVA Pool B ===
- Venue: Anthony Nesty Sporthal, Paramaribo, Suriname
- Dates: 30–31 October 2016
- All times are Suriname Time (UTC−03:00).

Pos	Team	Pld	W	L	Pts	SPW	SPL	SPR	SW	SL	SR	Qualification
1	Jamaica	3	3	0	14	244	161	1.516	9	1	9.000	Second round
2	Suriname	3	2	1	9	262	231	1.134	7	5	1.400	Second round
3	Guadeloupe	3	1	2	7	239	236	1.013	5	6	0.833	
4	Turks and Caicos Islands	3	0	3	0	108	225	0.480	0	9	0.000	

Date	Time		Score		Set 1	Set 2	Set 3	Set 4	Set 5	Total	Report
30 Oct	09:00	Suriname	1–3	Jamaica	25–19	16–25	18–25	17–25		76–94	P2 P3
30 Oct	11:00	Turks and Caicos Islands	0–3	Guadeloupe	12–25	21–25	17–25			50–75	P2 P3
30 Oct	18:00	Jamaica	3–0	Guadeloupe	25–23	25–17	25–21			75–61	P2 P3
30 Oct	20:30	Suriname	3–0	Turks and Caicos Islands	25–11	25–12	25–11			75–34	P2 P3
31 Oct	18:00	Jamaica	3–0	Turks and Caicos Islands	25–6	25–7	25–11			75–24	P2 P3
31 Oct	20:00	Suriname	3–2	Guadeloupe	23–25	25–23	25–19	23–25	15–11	111–103	P2 P3

=== CAZOVA Pool C ===
- Venue: Gymnasium Vincent, Port-au-Prince, Haiti
- Dates: 9–10 July 2016
- All times are Eastern Daylight Time (UTC−04:00).

Pos	Team	Pld	W	L	Pts	SPW	SPL	SPR	SW	SL	SR	Qualification
1	Haiti	3	3	0	15	227	159	1.428	9	0	MAX	Second round
2	Curaçao	3	2	1	10	216	197	1.096	6	3	2.000	Second round
3	U.S. Virgin Islands	3	1	2	5	187	209	0.895	3	6	0.500	
4	Cayman Islands	3	0	3	0	160	225	0.711	0	9	0.000	

Date	Time		Score		Set 1	Set 2	Set 3	Set 4	Set 5	Total	Report
9 Jul	17:00	Curaçao	3–0	U.S. Virgin Islands	25–21	25–16	26–24			76–61	P2 P3
9 Jul	19:30	Haiti	3–0	Cayman Islands	25–10	25–17	25–16			75–43	P2 P3
10 Jul	09:00	Curaçao	3–0	Cayman Islands	25–18	25–21	25–20			75–59	P2 P3
10 Jul	11:17	Haiti	3–0	U.S. Virgin Islands	25–16	25–19	25–16			75–51	P2 P3
10 Jul	16:56	U.S. Virgin Islands	3–0	Cayman Islands	25–19	25–19	25–20			75–58	P2 P3
10 Jul	19:38	Haiti	3–0	Curaçao	27–25	25–21	25–19			77–65	P2 P3

=== ECVA Pool A ===
- Venue: YMCA Sports Complex, St. John's, Antigua and Barbuda
- Dates: 9–11 September 2016
- All times are Atlantic Standard Time (UTC−04:00).

==== Preliminary round ====
Pos	Team	Pld	W	L	Pts	SPW	SPL	SPR	SW	SL	SR	Qualification
1	Antigua and Barbuda	3	3	0	14	242	155	1.561	9	1	9.000	Final
2	Anguilla	3	2	1	11	232	185	1.254	7	3	2.333	Final
3	Sint Eustatius	3	1	2	4	181	239	0.757	3	7	0.429	3rd place match
4	Montserrat	3	0	3	1	174	250	0.696	1	9	0.111	3rd place match

Date	Time		Score		Set 1	Set 2	Set 3	Set 4	Set 5	Total	Report
9 Sep	10:08	Anguilla	3–0	Sint Eustatius	25–8	25–15	25–22			75–45	P2 P3
9 Sep	12:06	Antigua and Barbuda	3–0	Montserrat	25–16	25–13	25–8			75–37	P2 P3
9 Sep	22:00	Antigua and Barbuda	3–0	Sint Eustatius	25–6	25–16	25–14			75–36	P2 P3
10 Sep	11:20	Sint Eustatius	3–1	Montserrat	27–25	23–25	25–18	25–21		100–89	P2 P3
10 Sep	21:32	Antigua and Barbuda	3–1	Anguilla	25–21	17–25	25–13	25–23		92–82	P2 P3
11 Sep	09:00	Anguilla	3–0	Montserrat	25–15	25–15	25–18			75–48	P2 P3

==== Finals ====
===== 3rd place match =====
Date	Time		Score		Set 1	Set 2	Set 3	Set 4	Set 5	Total	Report
11 Sep	17:00	Sint Eustatius	3–0	Montserrat	25–14	25–14	25–16			75–44	P2 P3

===== Final =====
Date	Time		Score		Set 1	Set 2	Set 3	Set 4	Set 5	Total	Report
11 Sep	21:00	Antigua and Barbuda	3–1	Anguilla	25–18	22–25	33–31	25–13		105–87	P2 P3

==== Final standing ====
Rank	Team
1	Antigua and Barbuda
2	Anguilla
3	Sint Eustatius
4	Montserrat

Qualified for the Second round

=== ECVA Pool B ===
- Venue: The La Borie Indoor Facility, St. George's, Grenada
- Dates: 20–21 August 2016
- All times are Atlantic Standard Time (UTC−04:00).

==== Preliminary round ====
Pos	Team	Pld	W	L	Pts	SPW	SPL	SPR	SW	SL	SR	Qualification
1	Saint Vincent and the Grenadines	3	3	0	13	269	240	1.121	9	2	4.500	Final
2	Saint Kitts and Nevis	3	1	2	6	276	273	1.011	5	7	0.714	Final
3	Bermuda	3	1	2	6	261	279	0.935	5	7	0.714	3rd place match
4	Grenada	3	1	2	5	253	267	0.948	4	7	0.571	3rd place match

Date	Time		Score		Set 1	Set 2	Set 3	Set 4	Set 5	Total	Report
20 Aug	10:03	Saint Vincent and the Grenadines	3–1	Saint Kitts and Nevis	25–21	20–25	27–25	25–21		97–92	P2 P3
20 Aug	12:44	Grenada	3–1	Bermuda	18–25	25–18	25–23	29–27		97–93	P2 P3
20 Aug	19:00	Saint Vincent and the Grenadines	3–1	Bermuda	25–23	25–16	19–25	25–15		94–79	P2 P3
20 Aug	22:28	Grenada	1–3	Saint Kitts and Nevis	18–25	22–25	25–21	22–25		87–96	P2 P3
21 Aug	09:27	Saint Kitts and Nevis	1–3	Bermuda	25–14	19–25	21–25	23–25		88–89	P2 P3
21 Aug	12:01	Grenada	0–3	Saint Vincent and the Grenadines	23–25	20–25	26–28			69–78	P2 P3

==== Finals ====
===== 3rd place match =====
Date	Time		Score		Set 1	Set 2	Set 3	Set 4	Set 5	Total	Report
21 Aug	19:09	Grenada	3–0	Bermuda	25–23	25–19	28–26			78–68	P2 P3

===== Final =====
Date	Time		Score		Set 1	Set 2	Set 3	Set 4	Set 5	Total	Report
21 Aug	21:09	Saint Vincent and the Grenadines	0–3	Saint Kitts and Nevis	19–25	22–25	22–25			63–75	P2 P3

==== Final standing ====
Rank	Team
1	Saint Kitts and Nevis
2	Saint Vincent and the Grenadines
3	Grenada
4	Bermuda

Qualified for the Second round

=== ECVA Pool C ===
- Venue: Matthew Francois Sports Auditorium, Marigot, Saint Martin
- Dates: 27–28 August 2016
- All times are Atlantic Standard Time (UTC−04:00).

==== Preliminary round ====
Pos	Team	Pld	W	L	Pts	SPW	SPL	SPR	SW	SL	SR	Qualification
1	Saint Martin	2	2	0	9	167	136	1.228	6	1	6.000	Final
2	Sint Maarten	2	1	1	6	163	136	1.199	4	3	1.333	Final
3	British Virgin Islands	2	0	2	0	92	150	0.613	0	6	0.000	

Date	Time		Score		Set 1	Set 2	Set 3	Set 4	Set 5	Total	Report
27 Aug	10:11	Sint Maarten	3–0	British Virgin Islands	25–14	25–15	25–15			75–44	P2 P3
27 Aug	18:58	Saint Martin	3–1	Sint Maarten	16–25	26–24	25–20	25–19		92–88	P2 P3
28 Aug	10:00	Saint Martin	3–0	British Virgin Islands	25–19	25–16	25–13			75–48	P2 P3

==== Final ====
Date	Time		Score		Set 1	Set 2	Set 3	Set 4	Set 5	Total	Report
28 Aug	19:14	Saint Martin	2–3	Sint Maarten	13–25	25–22	25–22	24–26	10–15	97–110	P2 P3

==== Final standing ====
Rank	Team
1	Sint Maarten
2	Saint Martin
3	British Virgin Islands

Qualified for the Second round

=== AFECAVOL ===
- Venue: SCA Multipurpose Mercy Center, Belize City, Belize
- Dates: 24–30 September 2016
- All times are Central Standard Time (UTC−06:00).

Pos	Team	Pld	W	L	Pts	SPW	SPL	SPR	SW	SL	SR	Qualification
1	Guatemala	6	6	0	29	469	368	1.274	18	1	18.000	2017 NORCECA Championship
2	Dominican Republic	6	5	1	24	498	374	1.332	16	5	3.200	2017 NORCECA Championship
3	Belize	6	4	2	18	517	509	1.016	14	10	1.400	
4	El Salvador	6	3	3	15	475	476	0.998	11	11	1.000	
5	Panama	6	2	4	8	443	504	0.879	7	15	0.467	
6	Honduras	6	1	5	8	426	503	0.847	6	15	0.400	
7	Nicaragua	6	0	6	3	426	520	0.819	3	18	0.167	

Date	Time		Score		Set 1	Set 2	Set 3	Set 4	Set 5	Total	Report
24 Sep	15:15	Panama	0–3	Dominican Republic	18–25	16–25	16–25			50–75	P2 P3
24 Sep	17:24	Nicaragua	0–3	Honduras	24–26	25–27	22–25			71–78	P2 P3
24 Sep	20:27	El Salvador	2–3	Belize	13–25	25–18	25–27	25–18	14–16	102–104	P2 P3
25 Sep	15:00	Honduras	0–3	Dominican Republic	17–25	15–25	17–25			49–75	P2 P3
25 Sep	17:00	El Salvador	3–0	Panama	25–15	25–19	25–20			75–54	P2 P3
25 Sep	19:30	Belize	0–3	Guatemala	15–25	18–25	20–25			53–75	P2 P3
26 Sep	15:00	Nicaragua	0–3	El Salvador	29–31	12–25	21–25			62–81	P2 P3
26 Sep	17:15	Guatemala	3–0	Honduras	25–15	25–18	25–16			75–49	P2 P3
26 Sep	19:30	Panama	1–3	Belize	21–25	12–25	25–20	17–25		75–95	P2 P3
27 Sep	15:00	Dominican Republic	1–3	Guatemala	25–18	23–25	21–25	21–25		90–93	P2 P3
27 Sep	17:47	Honduras	1–3	Panama	18–25	25–18	22–25	25–27		90–95	P2 P3
27 Sep	20:28	Belize	3–1	Nicaragua	29–27	21–25	25–22	25–20		100–94	P2 P3
28 Sep	15:00	Guatemala	3–0	El Salvador	26–24	25–22	25–20			76–66	P2 P3
28 Sep	17:10	Panama	3–2	Nicaragua	25–19	23–25	23–25	25–18	15–7	111–94	P2 P3
28 Sep	20:00	Dominican Republic	3–2	Belize	25–17	21–25	25–10	22–25	15–12	108–89	P2 P3
29 Sep	15:00	Honduras	2–3	El Salvador	26–24	23–25	18–25	25–22	13–15	105–111	P2 P3
29 Sep	17:58	Dominican Republic	3–0	Nicaragua	25–13	25–22	25–18			75–53	P2 P3
29 Sep	19:53	Guatemala	3–0	Panama	25–20	25–19	25–19			75–58	P2 P3
30 Sep	15:00	Nicaragua	0–3	Guatemala	16–25	14–25	22–25			52–75	P2 P3
30 Sep	17:00	El Salvador	0–3	Dominican Republic	15–25	13–25	12–25			40–75	P2 P3
30 Sep	19:30	Belize	3–0	Honduras	25–16	26–24	25–15			76–55	P2 P3

== Second round ==
- The top two teams from the 2017 CAZOVA Championship and the winners in each ECVA pool qualified for the 2017 NORCECA Championship.

=== 2017 CAZOVA Championship ===
- Venue: National Cycling Centre, Couva, Trinidad and Tobago
- Dates: 4–9 July 2017
- All times are Atlantic Standard Time (UTC−04:00).

==== Preliminary round ====
===== CAZOVA Pool D =====
Pos	Team	Pld	W	L	Pts	SPW	SPL	SPR	SW	SL	SR	Qualification
1	Trinidad and Tobago	3	3	0	9	329	316	1.041	9	6	1.500	Semifinals
2	Suriname	3	2	1	10	298	291	1.024	8	5	1.600	Quarterfinals
3	Martinique	3	1	2	8	264	256	1.031	6	6	1.000	Quarterfinals
4	Curaçao	3	0	3	3	256	284	0.901	3	9	0.333	7th place match

Date	Time		Score		Set 1	Set 2	Set 3	Set 4	Set 5	Total	Report
4 Jul	14:10	Martinique	1–3	Suriname	21–25	25–17	23–25	19–25		88–92	P2 P3
4 Jul	23:08	Trinidad and Tobago	3–2	Curaçao	23–25	22–25	25–23	25–23	15–12	110–108	P2 P3
5 Jul	14:14	Curaçao	0–3	Martinique	14–25	23–25	23–25			60–75	P2 P3
5 Jul	21:53	Trinidad and Tobago	3–2	Suriname	22–25	25–22	28–30	25–21	15–9	115–107	P2 P3
6 Jul	14:00	Suriname	3–1	Curaçao	25–20	24–26	25–19	25–23		99–88	P2 P3
6 Jul	21:55	Trinidad and Tobago	3–2	Martinique	25–22	20–25	19–25	25–21	15–8	104–101	P2

===== CAZOVA Pool E =====
Pos	Team	Pld	W	L	Pts	SPW	SPL	SPR	SW	SL	SR	Qualification
1	Barbados	3	3	0	9	308	307	1.003	9	6	1.500	Semifinals
2	Jamaica	3	2	1	11	274	247	1.109	8	4	2.000	Quarterfinals
3	Haiti	3	1	2	7	287	286	1.003	6	7	0.857	Quarterfinals
4	Bahamas	3	0	3	3	239	268	0.892	3	9	0.333	7th place match

Date	Time		Score		Set 1	Set 2	Set 3	Set 4	Set 5	Total	Report
4 Jul	16:43	Jamaica	3–1	Haiti	25–22	25–20	19–25	25–22		94–89	P2 P3
4 Jul	20:19	Barbados	3–2	Bahamas	22–25	25–19	12–25	25–18	15–11	99–98	P2 P3
5 Jul	16:04	Bahamas	0–3	Jamaica	18–25	19–25	18–25			55–75	P2 P3
5 Jul	19:00	Barbados	3–2	Haiti	22–25	19–25	25–23	25–18	15–13	106–104	P2 P3
6 Jul	16:34	Bahamas	1–3	Haiti	26–28	16–25	25–16	19–25		86–94	P2 P3
6 Jul	19:00	Barbados	3–2	Jamaica	25–19	17–25	25–22	20–25	16–14	103–105	P2 P3

==== Final round ====
===== 7th–8th places =====
====== 7th place match ======
Date	Time		Score		Set 1	Set 2	Set 3	Set 4	Set 5	Total	Report
7 Jul	14:00	Bahamas	2–3	Curaçao	29–27	16–25	25–20	22–25	14–16	106–113	P2 P3

===== Final six =====
Quarterfinals
7 July
Suriname	1
Haiti	3
7 July
Jamaica	0
Martinique	3

Semifinals
8 July
Trinidad and Tobago	3
Haiti	1
8 July
Barbados	1
Martinique	3

Final
9 July
Trinidad and Tobago	3
Martinique	1
3rd place match
9 July
Barbados	3
Haiti	0

====== Quarterfinals ======
Date	Time		Score		Set 1	Set 2	Set 3	Set 4	Set 5	Total	Report
7 Jul	16:58	Jamaica	0–3	Martinique	15–25	23–25	17–25			55–75	P2 P3
7 Jul	19:00	Suriname	1–3	Haiti	25–20	20–25	21–25	31–33		97–103	P2 P3

====== Semifinals ======
Date	Time		Score		Set 1	Set 2	Set 3	Set 4	Set 5	Total	Report
8 Jul	17:04	Barbados	1–3	Martinique	26–28	20–25	25–14	23–25		94–92	P2 P3
8 Jul	19:40	Trinidad and Tobago	3–1	Haiti	22–25	25–20	25–21	25–22		97–88	P2 P3

====== 5th place match ======
Date	Time		Score		Set 1	Set 2	Set 3	Set 4	Set 5	Total	Report
8 Jul	14:02	Jamaica	3–2	Suriname	26–24	24–26	25–22	23–25	19–17	117–114	P2 P3

====== 3rd place match ======
Date	Time		Score		Set 1	Set 2	Set 3	Set 4	Set 5	Total	Report
9 Jul	14:00	Barbados	3–0	Haiti	25–19	25–13	27–25			77–57	P2 P3

====== Final ======
Date	Time		Score		Set 1	Set 2	Set 3	Set 4	Set 5	Total	Report
9 Jul	16:00	Trinidad and Tobago	3–1	Martinique	23–25	25–17	25–16	25–23		98–81	P2 P3

==== Final standing ====
Rank	Team
1st place, gold medalist(s)	Trinidad and Tobago
2nd place, silver medalist(s)	Martinique
3rd place, bronze medalist(s)	Barbados
4	Haiti
5	Jamaica
6	Suriname
7	Curaçao
8	Bahamas

Qualified for the 2017 NORCECA Championship

=== ECVA Pool D ===
- Venue: Beausejour Indoor facility, Gros Islet, Saint Lucia
- Dates: 12–13 August 2017
- All times are Atlantic Standard Time (UTC−04:00).

==== Preliminary round ====
Pos	Team	Pld	W	L	Pts	SPW	SPL	SPR	SW	SL	SR	Qualification
1	Saint Lucia	3	3	0	14	247	202	1.223	9	1	9.000	Final
2	Sint Maarten	3	2	1	9	240	222	1.081	6	4	1.500	Final
3	Anguilla	3	1	2	6	213	236	0.903	4	6	0.667	3rd place match
4	Saint Martin	3	0	3	1	214	254	0.843	1	9	0.111	3rd place match

Date	Time		Score		Set 1	Set 2	Set 3	Set 4	Set 5	Total	Report
12 Aug	09:14	Saint Lucia	3–0	Saint Martin	25–18	25–20	25–21			75–59	P2 P3
12 Aug	11:12	Sint Maarten	3–0	Anguilla	25–17	25–17	25–22			75–56	P2 P3
12 Aug	19:05	Sint Maarten	3–1	Saint Martin	25–18	25–19	23–25	30–28		103–90	P2 P3
12 Aug	21:00	Saint Lucia	3–1	Anguilla	21–25	25–18	25–18	25–20		96–81	P2 P3
13 Aug	09:05	Saint Martin	0–3	Anguilla	18–25	23–25	24–26			65–76	P2 P3
13 Aug	11:00	Saint Lucia	3–0	Sint Maarten	25–19	26–24	25–19			76–62	P2 P3

==== Finals ====
===== 3rd place match =====
Date	Time		Score		Set 1	Set 2	Set 3	Set 4	Set 5	Total	Report
13 Aug	19:01	Anguilla	2–3	Saint Martin	18–25	25–21	25–22	14–25	12–15	94–108	P2 P3

===== Final =====
Date	Time		Score		Set 1	Set 2	Set 3	Set 4	Set 5	Total	Report
13 Aug	21:37	Saint Lucia	3–0	Sint Maarten	25–18	25–19	25–16			75–53	P2 P3

==== Final standing ====
Rank	Team
1	Saint Lucia
2	Sint Maarten
3	Saint Martin
4	Anguilla

Qualified for the 2017 NORCECA Championship

=== ECVA Pool E ===
- Venue: Beausejour Indoor facility, Gros Islet, Saint Lucia
- Dates: 9–10 August 2017
- All times are Atlantic Standard Time (UTC−04:00).

==== Preliminary round ====
Pos	Team	Pld	W	L	Pts	SPW	SPL	SPR	SW	SL	SR	Qualification
1	Saint Vincent and the Grenadines	3	2	1	10	299	280	1.068	8	5	1.600	Final
2	Dominica	3	2	1	8	282	292	0.966	7	6	1.167	Final
3	Antigua and Barbuda	3	2	1	8	290	302	0.960	7	6	1.167	3rd place match
4	Saint Kitts and Nevis	3	0	3	4	302	299	1.010	4	9	0.444	3rd place match

Date	Time		Score		Set 1	Set 2	Set 3	Set 4	Set 5	Total	Report
9 Aug	09:00	Dominica	3–1	Antigua and Barbuda	26–28	25–19	25–20	25–20		101–87	P2 P3
9 Aug	12:05	Saint Vincent and the Grenadines	3–1	Saint Kitts and Nevis	25–23	26–24	14–25	30–28		95–100	P2 P3
9 Aug	19:33	Dominica	1–3	Saint Vincent and the Grenadines	18–25	27–25	14–25	18–25		77–100	P2 P3
9 Aug	22:13	Saint Kitts and Nevis	1–3	Antigua and Barbuda	28–30	20–25	25–19	24–26		97–100	P2 P3
10 Aug	09:33	Saint Kitts and Nevis	2–3	Dominica	25–21	25–18	20–25	23–25	12–15	105–104	P2 P3
10 Aug	12:30	Antigua and Barbuda	3–2	Saint Vincent and the Grenadines	19–25	19–25	25–22	25–20	15–12	103–104	P2 P3

==== Finals ====
===== 3rd place match =====
Date	Time		Score		Set 1	Set 2	Set 3	Set 4	Set 5	Total	Report
10 Aug	19:37	Antigua and Barbuda	3–2	Saint Kitts and Nevis	24–26	25–27	25–20	25–19	15–9	114–101	P2 P3

===== Final =====
Date	Time		Score		Set 1	Set 2	Set 3	Set 4	Set 5	Total	Report
10 Aug	22:40	Saint Vincent and the Grenadines	3–1	Dominica	22–25	25–19	25–18	25–21		97–83	P2 P3

==== Final standing ====
Rank	Team
1	Saint Vincent and the Grenadines
2	Dominica
3	Antigua and Barbuda
4	Saint Kitts and Nevis

Qualified for the 2017 NORCECA Championship

== Final round ==
- The top three teams from the 2017 NORCECA Championship and the top two teams from the final four qualified for the 2018 World Championship, whereas the fourth and fifth ranked teams of the 2017 NORCECA Championship qualified for the final four.

=== 2017 NORCECA Championship ===
- Venues: OTC Sports Center I, Colorado Springs, United States and OTC Sports Center II, Colorado Springs, United States
- Dates: 26 September – 1 October 2017

Rank	Team
1st place, gold medalist(s)	United States
2nd place, silver medalist(s)	Dominican Republic
3rd place, bronze medalist(s)	Canada
4	Mexico
5	Guatemala
6	Trinidad and Tobago
7	Martinique
8	Costa Rica
9	Saint Vincent and the Grenadines
10	Saint Lucia

Qualified for the 2018 World Championship
Qualified for the 2018 World Championship NORCECA Qualification Final four

=== Final four ===
- Venue: Sala 19 de Noviembre, Pinar del Río, Cuba
- Dates: 10–12 November 2017
- All times are Cuba Standard Time (UTC−05:00).

Pos	Team	Pld	W	L	Pts	SPW	SPL	SPR	SW	SL	SR	Qualification
1	Puerto Rico	3	2	1	10	221	191	1.157	6	3	2.000	2018 World Championship
2	Cuba	3	2	1	10	218	194	1.124	6	3	2.000	2018 World Championship
3	Mexico	3	2	1	10	204	194	1.052	6	3	2.000	
4	Guatemala	3	0	3	0	161	225	0.716	0	9	0.000	

Date	Time		Score		Set 1	Set 2	Set 3	Set 4	Set 5	Total	Report
10 Nov	14:30	Puerto Rico	3–0	Mexico	25–12	25–21	25–21			75–54	P2 P3
10 Nov	16:45	Cuba	3–0	Guatemala	25–15	25–15	25–18			75–48	P2 P3
11 Nov	14:30	Puerto Rico	3–0	Guatemala	25–19	25–20	25–18			75–57	P2 P3
11 Nov	16:35	Cuba	0–3	Mexico	17–25	23–25	23–25			63–75	P2 P3
12 Nov	14:30	Mexico	3–0	Guatemala	25–14	25–20	25–22			75–56	P2 P3
12 Nov	16:35	Cuba	3–0	Puerto Rico	25–21	25–22	30–28			80–71	P2 P3
