= Volleyball at the 2019 Pacific Games – Men's tournament =

The men's tournament of the Volleyball competition at the 2019 Pacific Games was held from July 11–20, 2019 at the National University of Samoa Gymnasium in Apia, Samoa. Tahiti won the gold medal by defeating Wallis and Futuna in the final.

== Participating teams ==
Eleven men's teams participated in the tournament:

Pool A

- Samoa
- American Samoa
- Guam

Pool B

- New Caledonia
- Tahiti
- Federated States of Micronesia

Pool C

- Kiribati
- Solomon Islands
- Papua New Guinea

Pool D

- Wallis and Futuna
- Tuvalu

== Preliminary round ==
=== Pool A ===
Pos	Team	Pld	W	L	Pts	SW	SL	SR	SPW	SPL	SPR	Qualification
1	Samoa	2	2	0	6	6	1	6.000	177	141	1.255	Second round
2	American Samoa	2	1	1	3	4	3	1.333	158	160	0.988	Second round
3	Guam	2	0	2	0	0	6	0.000	116	150	0.773	9th–11th playoffs

Date	Time		Score		Set 1	Set 2	Set 3	Set 4	Set 5	Total	Report
11 Jul	19:30	Samoa	3–0	Guam	25–17	25–22	25–19			75–58	
12 Jul	19:30	Samoa	3–1	American Samoa	25–12	25–19	24–26	28–26		102–83	
13 Jul	14:00	Guam	0–3	American Samoa	17–25	22–25	19–25			58–75	

=== Pool B ===
Pos	Team	Pld	W	L	Pts	SW	SL	SR	SPW	SPL	SPR	Qualification
1	Tahiti	2	2	0	5	6	2	3.000	180	138	1.304	Second round
2	New Caledonia	2	1	1	4	5	3	1.667	178	151	1.179	Second round
3	Federated States of Micronesia	2	0	2	0	0	6	0.000	81	150	0.540	9th–11th playoffs

Date	Time		Score		Set 1	Set 2	Set 3	Set 4	Set 5	Total	Report
11 Jul	14:00	Federated States of Micronesia	0–3	New Caledonia	17–25	16–25	13–25			46–75	
12 Jul	14:00	New Caledonia	2–3	Tahiti	25–23	25–17	20–25	22–25	11–15	103–105	
13 Jul	17:30	Tahiti	3–0	Federated States of Micronesia	25–11	25–13	25–11			75–35	

=== Pool C ===
Pos	Team	Pld	W	L	Pts	SW	SL	SR	SPW	SPL	SPR	Qualification
1	Papua New Guinea	2	2	0	6	6	1	6.000	173	114	1.518	Second round
2	Kiribati	2	1	1	2	4	5	0.800	170	199	0.854	Second round
3	Solomon Islands	2	0	2	1	2	6	0.333	152	182	0.835	9th–11th playoffs

Date	Time		Score		Set 1	Set 2	Set 3	Set 4	Set 5	Total	Report
11 Jul	16:15	Kiribati	1–3	Papua New Guinea	10–25	25–23	13–25	15–25		63–98	
12 Jul	15:00	Kiribati	3–2	Solomon Islands	23–25	25–20	19–25	25–21	15–10	107–101	
13 Jul	19:30	Papua New Guinea	3–0	Solomon Islands	25–18	25–13	25–20			75–51	

=== Pool D ===
Pos	Team	Pld	W	L	Pts	SW	SL	SR	SPW	SPL	SPR	Qualification
1	Wallis and Futuna	1	1	0	3	3	0	MAX	75	50	1.500	Second round
2	Tuvalu	1	0	1	0	0	3	0.000	50	75	0.667	Second round

Date	Time		Score		Set 1	Set 2	Set 3	Set 4	Set 5	Total	Report
12 Jul	17:30	Wallis and Futuna	3–0	Tuvalu	25–12	25–15	25–23			75–50	

== Second round ==
=== Pool E ===
Pos	Team	Pld	W	L	Pts	SW	SL	SR	SPW	SPL	SPR	Qualification
1	Samoa	3	3	0	9	9	2	4.500	279	222	1.257	Final round
2	Papua New Guinea	3	2	1	6	7	4	1.750	268	219	1.224	Final round
3	American Samoa	3	1	2	3	4	7	0.571	235	258	0.911	Final round
4	Kiribati	3	0	3	0	2	9	0.222	188	271	0.694	Final round

Date	Time		Score		Set 1	Set 2	Set 3	Set 4	Set 5	Total	Report
15 Jul	14:25	Samoa	3–0	Kiribati	25–15	25–16	25–13			75–44	
15 Jul	15:00	Papua New Guinea	3–0	American Samoa	25–19	25–16	25–19			75–54	
16 Jul	17:30	Samoa	3–1	Papua New Guinea	31–29	25–20	21–25	25–21		102–95	
16 Jul	19:30	American Samoa	3–1	Kiribati	25–18	23–25	25–20	25–18		98–81	

=== Pool F ===
Pos	Team	Pld	W	L	Pts	SW	SL	SR	SPW	SPL	SPR	Qualification
1	Tahiti	3	3	0	8	9	2	4.500	255	219	1.164	Final round
2	Wallis and Futuna	3	2	1	6	6	4	1.500	228	204	1.118	Final round
3	New Caledonia	3	1	2	4	6	6	1.000	257	249	1.032	Final round
4	Tuvalu	3	0	3	0	0	9	0.000	157	225	0.698	Final round

Date	Time		Score		Set 1	Set 2	Set 3	Set 4	Set 5	Total	Report
15 Jul	17:30	Tahiti	3–0	Tuvalu	25–23	25–17	25–20			75–60	
15 Jul	19:30	Wallis and Futuna	3–1	New Caledonia	25–15	22–25	25–19	25–20		97–79	
16 Jul	15:00	Tahiti	3–0	Wallis and Futuna	25–16	25–17	25–23			75–56	
16 Jul	16:50	New Caledonia	3–0	Tuvalu	25–15	25–18	25–14			75–47	

== 9th–11th playoffs ==
=== Pool G ===
Pos	Team	Pld	W	L	Pts	SW	SL	SR	SPW	SPL	SPR
1	Guam	2	2	0	5	6	3	2.000	212	196	1.082
2	Federated States of Micronesia	2	1	1	3	5	5	1.000	214	221	0.968
3	Solomon Islands	2	0	2	1	3	6	0.500	186	195	0.954

Date	Time		Score		Set 1	Set 2	Set 3	Set 4	Set 5	Total	Report
15 Jul	11:00	Guam	3–1	Solomon Islands	25–18	25–19	18–25	25–22		93–84	
16 Jul	15:00	Federated States of Micronesia	3–2	Solomon Islands	22–25	15–25	25–20	25–21	15–11	102–102	
17 Jul	19:30	Guam	3–2	Federated States of Micronesia	23–25	29–27	23–25	25–18	19–17	119–112	

== Final round ==
Quarterfinals
17 July
Samoa	3
Tuvalu	0
17 July
Wallis and Futuna	3
American Samoa	0
17 July
Tahiti	3
Kiribati	0
17 July
Papua New Guinea	0
New Caledonia	3

Semifinals
18 July
Samoa	1
Wallis and Futuna	3
18 July
Tahiti	3
New Caledonia	0

Final
20 July
Wallis and Futuna	0
Tahiti	3
3rd place match
20 July
Samoa	2
New Caledonia	3

5th–8th semifinals
18 July
Tuvalu	0
American Samoa	3
18 July
Kiribati	0
Papua New Guinea	3

5th place match
19 July
American Samoa	1
Papua New Guinea	3
7th place match
19 July
Tuvalu	3
Kiribati	2

=== Quarterfinals ===
Date	Time		Score		Set 1	Set 2	Set 3	Set 4	Set 5	Total	Report
17 Jul	16:00	Samoa	3–0	Tuvalu	25–18	25–16	25–16			75–50	
17 Jul	18:20	Papua New Guinea	0–3	New Caledonia	31–33	14–25	22–25			67–83	
17 Jul	18:45	Wallis and Futuna	3–0	American Samoa	25–14	25–20	25–19			75–53	
17 Jul	20:00	Tahiti	3–0	Kiribati	25–8	25–18	25–13			75–39	

=== 5th–8th semifinals ===
Date	Time		Score		Set 1	Set 2	Set 3	Set 4	Set 5	Total	Report
18 Jul	11:00	Kiribati	0–3	Papua New Guinea	11–25	14–25	29–31			54–81	
18 Jul	13:30	Tuvalu	0–3	American Samoa	21–25	21–25	17–25			59–75	

=== Semifinals ===
Date	Time		Score		Set 1	Set 2	Set 3	Set 4	Set 5	Total	Report
18 Jul	11:00	Samoa	1–3	Wallis and Futuna	25–21	16–25	14–25	21–25		76–96	
18 Jul	19:30	Tahiti	3–0	New Caledonia	26–24	25–23	25–21			76–68	

=== 7th place match ===
Date	Time		Score		Set 1	Set 2	Set 3	Set 4	Set 5	Total	Report
19 Jul	09:00	Tuvalu	3–2	Kiribati	18–25	22–25	25–20	25–21	15–13	105–104	

=== 5th place match ===
Date	Time		Score		Set 1	Set 2	Set 3	Set 4	Set 5	Total	Report
19 Jul	15:10	American Samoa	1–3	Papua New Guinea	20–25	21–25	25–22	18–25		84–97	

=== Bronze medal match ===
Date	Time		Score		Set 1	Set 2	Set 3	Set 4	Set 5	Total	Report
20 Jul	09:00	Samoa	2–3	New Caledonia	15–25	27–25	25–20	16–25	10–15	93–110	

=== Gold medal match ===
Date	Time		Score		Set 1	Set 2	Set 3	Set 4	Set 5	Total	Report
20 Jul	11:00	Wallis and Futuna	0–3	Tahiti	23–25	22–25	17–25			62–75	

== See also ==
- Volleyball at the 2019 Pacific Games – Women's tournament
