= Men's Central American Volleyball Championship =

- Sport: Volleyball
- Founded: 1974
- No. of teams: 5–7 (Round-robin)
- Continent: Central America and the Caribbean (AFECAVOL)
- Most recent champion: Guatemala (6th title)
- Most titles: Panama (8 titles)

The Men's Central American Volleyball Championship is the official competition for senior men’s national volleyball teams of Central America and the Caribbean, organized by the Central American Volleyball Confederation (AFECAVOL). Since its introduction in 1974, the tournament has been held every two years. The competition has been dominated by three teams: Panama, with 8 titles, and Costa Rica and Guatemala, with 6 titles each.

== History ==
Year	Host	Final			3rd place match			Teams
Year	Host	Champions	Score	Runners-up	3rd place	Score	4th place	Teams
1974; Details	El Salvador	Panama		Guatemala	El Salvador		Costa Rica	5
1976; Details	Costa Rica	Panama		Guatemala	Costa Rica		El Salvador	6
1977; Details	Guatemala	Guatemala		El Salvador	Costa Rica		Nicaragua	5
1987; Details	Nicaragua	Costa Rica		Panama	Guatemala		Nicaragua	6
1989; Details	(Costa Rica); San José	Costa Rica		Guatemala	Panama		Nicaragua	6
1991; Details	Honduras	Honduras		Panama	Nicaragua		Guatemala	5
1993; Details	El Salvador	Panama		El Salvador	Honduras		Costa Rica	5
1995; Details	(Guatemala); Escuintla	Panama		Honduras	Guatemala		Costa Rica	7
1997; Details	Panama City	Honduras		Guatemala	Costa Rica		Panama	6
1999; Details	Guatemala City	Costa Rica		Guatemala	Panama		Belize	6
2000; Details	(El Salvador); San Salvador	Costa Rica		Belize	Honduras		El Salvador	6
2002; Details	(Costa Rica); San José	Panama		Costa Rica	Honduras		El Salvador	6
2004; Details	(Honduras); Tegucigalpa	Panama		Honduras	Costa Rica		El Salvador	7
2006; Details	Panama City	Panama		Costa Rica	Guatemala		El Salvador	6
2008; Details	(Nicaragua); Managua	Panama		Guatemala	Costa Rica		El Salvador	7
2010; Details	(El Salvador); San Salvador	Costa Rica		El Salvador	Guatemala		Honduras	7
2012; Details	Guatemala City	Guatemala		Panama	Honduras		Costa Rica	6
2014; Details	(Honduras); Tegucigalpa	Costa Rica		Guatemala	Honduras		Nicaragua	7
2017; Details	Nicaragua	Guatemala		El Salvador	Honduras		Costa Rica	7
2018; Details	(El Salvador); San Salvador	Guatemala		Costa Rica	El Salvador		Nicaragua	7
2021; Details	Guatemala City	Guatemala		Costa Rica	Nicaragua		El Salvador	7
2023; Details	Belize City	Guatemala		El Salvador	Belize		Nicaragua	7

== Medals Summary ==
Rank	Nation	Gold	Silver	Bronze	Total
1	Panama	8	3	2	13
2	Guatemala	6	7	4	17
3	Costa Rica	6	4	5	15
4	Honduras	2	2	6	10
5	El Salvador	0	5	2	7
6	Belize	0	1	1	2
7	Nicaragua	0	0	2	2
Totals (7 entries)		22	22	22	66

== See also ==
- NORCECA Men's Volleyball Championship
- Men's Junior NORCECA Volleyball Championship
- Girls' Youth NORCECA Volleyball Championship
- Volleyball at the Pan American Games
- Men's Pan-American Volleyball Cup
- Volleyball at the Central American and Caribbean Games
