= Northern Ireland men's national volleyball team =

National volleyball team of Northern Ireland

Northern Ireland
- Association: Northern Ireland Volleyball
- Confederation: CEV

Uniforms
Home	Away
- www.nivolleyball.com

The Northern Ireland men's national volleyball team is the national volleyball team of Northern Ireland. The governing body for the men's national is called the Northern Ireland Volleyball Association (as well as the Northern Ireland women's national volleyball team).

== History ==
The Northern Ireland men's national team was formed in 1976. It was formed by Northern Ireland Volleyball Association. The men's team's inaugural match in official competition was held again the Republic of Ireland.

In 1989, Northern Ireland won the British Isles Championships in Belfast.

They reached Round 2 of the 2018 FIVB Volleyball Men's World Championship qualification (CEV) with Gerry Ford as head coach and Harry Gilliland as assistant coach. They competed in the CEV European Small Nations division and qualified for the final of the tournament held in 2024.

== Current roster ==
Name	Position	Height	Current Club
Peter Stewart	Outside	6'4"	Richill
Callum Currie	Libero	6'3"	Northumbria
Alan McKnight	Setter	6'2"	PVC Eagles
Niall Burton	Middle	6'7"	UEL
Mark Fulton	Setter	6'2"	Richill
Alan Workman	Outside	6'5"	Garvagh Phoenix
Jonny Workman	Libero	6'3"	Ballymoney
Patrick Crooks	Opposite	6'7"	Liverpool
Graeme Currie	Opposite	6'3"	Richill
Robert Nicholson	Middle	6'7"	IBB Polonia
Jeff Scott	Outside	6'2"	Ballymoney
Nick Wright	Outside	6'4"	Richill
Stephen White	Libero	5'11"	QUB
Will Robb	Utility	6'0"	Richill
Jay Ford (Academy)	Setter	6'3"	QUB
Matt Outhwaite (Academy)	Libero	5'9"	Richill
Gavin McCaughern (Academy)	Middle	6'3"	QUB
Harvey Whiteside (Academy)	Outside	6'5"	QUB

== Honours ==
CEV Small Countries Championships

- Gold Medal (Winners): 1989 (British Isles Championship/Small Countries precursor).
- Silver Medal: 1991, 2002.
- Bronze Medal: 2000, 2004.
- Finalists: 2024

British Isles Championships

- Winners: 1989.
