= Beach volleyball at the 2022 Pacific Mini Games =

- Venues: Crowne Plaza Resort Beach (Saipan), Tachogna Beach (Tinian)
- Location: Saipan, and Tinian, Northern Mariana Islands
- Dates: 20–24 June
- Competitors: 38 from 11 nations

The beach volleyball competition at the 2022 Pacific Mini Games will be held from 20 to 24 June 2022 at the Crowne Plaza Resort Beach in Saipan, and Tachogna Beach in Tinian, Northern Mariana Islands.

== Participating nations ==
As of 1 June 2022, eleven countries and territories have confirmed their participation in beach volleyball for the games.

Pacific Games Associations
- Guam ()
- Kiribati ()
- New Caledonia ()
- Northern Mariana Islands () (Host)
- Palau ()
- Samoa ()
- Solomon Islands ()
- Tahiti ()
- Tuvalu ()
- Vanuatu ()
- Wallis and Futuna ()

== Medal summary ==
=== Medal table ===
* Host nation (Northern Mariana Islands)

Rank	Nation	Gold	Silver	Bronze	Total
Totals (0 entries)		0	0	0	0

=== Medalists ===
Event	Gold	Silver	Bronze
Men's tournament			
Women's tournament			
