= 2017 Men's NORCECA Volleyball Championship =

Volleyball championship

2017 Men's NORCECA Championship

Tournament details
- Host country: United States
- City: Colorado Springs
- Dates: 26 September – 1 October
- Teams: 10 (from 1 confederation)
- Venue: 2 (in 1 host city)

Final positions
- Champions: United States (9th title)
- Runners-up: Dominican Republic
- Third place: Canada
- Fourth place: Mexico

Tournament awards
- MVP: (United States) Micah Christenson
- Best Setter: (Mexico) Pedro Rangel
- Best OH: (United States) Aaron Russell (Canada) Stephen Maar
- Best MB: (Mexico) José Martínez (Guatemala) Leonel Antonio Aragon
- Best OPP: (Canada) Sharone Vernon-Evans
- Best Libero: (Costa Rica) Luis Chávez

Tournament statistics
- Matches played: 25
- Best scorer: (Costa Rica) Alberto Blanco (91 points)
- Best server: (Martinique) Joann Breleur (1.00 Avg)
- Best digger: (Costa Rica) Luis Chávez (2.18 Avg)
- Best receiver: (Mexico) Jorge Barajas (78.79%)

The 2017 Men's NORCECA Volleyball Championship was the 25th edition of the tournament, and was held in Colorado Springs, United States from 26 September to 1 October 2017. The top three teams qualified for the 2018 FIVB Volleyball Men's World Championship, whereas the fourth and fifth ranked teams qualified for the 2018 World Championship NORCECA qualification final four.

Originally the 2017 NORCECA Championship was the only competition from the area to offer the 2018 World Championship qualification quota, but due to the pass of hurricanes Irma and Maria for the Caribbean sea, Cuba and Puerto Rico were unable to compete, NORCECA authorities decided to make the 2018 World Championship NORCECA qualification final four tournament - Cuba, Puerto Rico and the 4th and 5th placed teams of the 2017 NORCECA Championship.

== Qualification ==
The top six ranked teams from the NORCECA Ranking as of 1 January 2016 qualified directly. Other six teams qualified through the zonal qualification.

Direct Qualification		Zonal Qualification	
NORCECA Ranking	United States	CAZOVA	Trinidad and Tobago
NORCECA Ranking	Canada	CAZOVA	Martinique
NORCECA Ranking	~~Cuba~~ withdrew (Note: Cuba had to withdraw from the tournament due to the closure of the US Embassy in Havana, and after Cuba sustained damages during Hurricane Irma.)	ECVA	Saint Lucia
NORCECA Ranking	~~Puerto Rico~~ withdrew (Note: Puerto Rico suffered a devastating hit from Hurricane Maria and their team was unable to participate at the NORCECA competition.)	ECVA	Saint Vincent and the Grenadines
NORCECA Ranking	Mexico	AFECAVOL	Guatemala
NORCECA Ranking	Costa Rica	AFECAVOL	Dominican Republic

== Pools composition ==
Teams were seeded following the serpentine system according to their NORCECA Ranking as of 1 January 2017. Rankings are shown in brackets.

Pool A	Pool B	Pool C
United States (1)	Canada (2)	Mexico (4)
Dominican Republic (9)	Trinidad and Tobago (8)	Costa Rica (6)
Guatemala (10)	Saint Lucia (13)	Martinique (26)
		Saint Vincent and the Grenadines (27)

== Venues ==
- OTC Sports Center I, Colorado Springs, United States – Pool A, B, 5th–8th semifinals and Final six
- OTC Sports Center II, Colorado Springs, United States – Pool C and 5th–10th places

== Pool standing procedure ==
1. Number of matches won
2. Match points
3. Points ratio
4. Sets ratio
5. Result of the last match between the tied teams

Match won 3–0: 5 match points for the winner, 0 match points for the loser
Match won 3–1: 4 match points for the winner, 1 match point for the loser
Match won 3–2: 3 match points for the winner, 2 match points for the loser

== Preliminary round ==
- All times are Mountain Daylight Time (UTC−06:00).

=== Pool A ===
Pos	Team	Pld	W	L	Pts	SPW	SPL	SPR	SW	SL	SR	Qualification
1	United States	2	2	0	10	150	84	1.786	6	0	MAX	Quarterfinals
2	Dominican Republic	2	1	1	5	123	129	0.953	3	3	1.000	Quarterfinals
3	Guatemala	2	0	2	0	90	150	0.600	0	6	0.000	5th–10th quarterfinals

Date	Time		Score		Set 1	Set 2	Set 3	Set 4	Set 5	Total	Report
26 Sep	19:00	United States	3–0	Guatemala	25–12	25–14	25–10			75–36	P2 P3
27 Sep	19:00	Dominican Republic	3–0	Guatemala	25–16	25–20	25–18			75–54	P2 P3
28 Sep	19:00	United States	3–0	Dominican Republic	25–17	25–21	25–10			75–48	P2 P3

=== Pool B ===
Pos	Team	Pld	W	L	Pts	SPW	SPL	SPR	SW	SL	SR	Qualification
1	Canada	2	2	0	10	150	73	2.055	6	0	MAX	Semifinals
2	Trinidad and Tobago	2	1	1	5	118	123	0.959	3	3	1.000	Quarterfinals
3	Saint Lucia	2	0	2	0	78	150	0.520	0	6	0.000	5th–10th quarterfinals

Date	Time		Score		Set 1	Set 2	Set 3	Set 4	Set 5	Total	Report
26 Sep	17:00	Trinidad and Tobago	3–0	Saint Lucia	25–15	25–16	25–17			75–48	P2 P3
27 Sep	17:00	Canada	3–0	Saint Lucia	25–9	25–13	25–8			75–30	P2 P3
28 Sep	17:00	Canada	3–0	Trinidad and Tobago	25–21	25–12	25–10			75–43	P2 P3

=== Pool C ===
Pos	Team	Pld	W	L	Pts	SPW	SPL	SPR	SW	SL	SR	Qualification
1	Mexico	3	3	0	15	225	116	1.940	9	0	MAX	Semifinals
2	Costa Rica	3	2	1	9	218	206	1.058	6	4	1.500	Quarterfinals
3	Martinique	3	1	2	6	194	217	0.894	4	6	0.667	5th–10th quarterfinals
4	Saint Vincent and the Grenadines	3	0	3	0	127	225	0.564	0	9	0.000	5th–10th quarterfinals

Date	Time		Score		Set 1	Set 2	Set 3	Set 4	Set 5	Total	Report
26 Sep	17:00	Costa Rica	3–1	Martinique	25–19	25–16	23–25	25–21		98–81	P2 P3
26 Sep	19:17	Mexico	3–0	Saint Vincent and the Grenadines	25–7	25–16	25–10			75–33	P2 P3
27 Sep	17:00	Costa Rica	3–0	Saint Vincent and the Grenadines	25–10	25–19	25–21			75–50	P2 P3
27 Sep	19:00	Mexico	3–0	Martinique	25–11	25–15	25–12			75–38	P2 P3
28 Sep	17:00	Martinique	3–0	Saint Vincent and the Grenadines	25–10	25–14	25–20			75–44	P2 P3
28 Sep	19:00	Mexico	3–0	Costa Rica	25–19	25–16	25–10			75–45	P2 P3

== Final round ==
- All times are Mountain Daylight Time (UTC−06:00).

=== 5th–10th places ===
5th–10th quarterfinals
29 September
Martinique	3
Saint Vincent and the Grenadines	0
29 September
Guatemala	3
Saint Lucia	0

5th–8th semifinals
30 September
Martinique	0
Trinidad and Tobago	3
30 September
Guatemala	3
Costa Rica	1

5th place match
1 October
Trinidad and Tobago	0
Guatemala	3
7th place match
1 October
Martinique	3
Costa Rica	2

==== 5th–10th quarterfinals ====
Date	Time		Score		Set 1	Set 2	Set 3	Set 4	Set 5	Total	Report
29 Sep	17:00	Martinique	3–0	Saint Vincent and the Grenadines	25–16	25–18	25–16			75–50	P2 P3
29 Sep	19:00	Guatemala	3–0	Saint Lucia	25–17	25–15	25–16			75–48	P2 P3

==== 5th–8th semifinals ====
Date	Time	Venue		Score		Set 1	Set 2	Set 3	Set 4	Set 5	Total	Report
30 Sep	15:00	SC1	Guatemala	3–1	Costa Rica	20–25	25–21	25–17	25–15		95–78	P2 P3
30 Sep	17:16	SC2	Martinique	0–3	Trinidad and Tobago	20–25	23–25	18–25			61–75	P2 P3

==== 9th place match ====
Date	Time		Score		Set 1	Set 2	Set 3	Set 4	Set 5	Total	Report
30 Sep	15:00	Saint Vincent and the Grenadines	3–1	Saint Lucia	22–25	25–20	25–19	25–15		97–79	P2 P3

==== 7th place match ====
Date	Time		Score		Set 1	Set 2	Set 3	Set 4	Set 5	Total	Report
1 Oct	14:00	Martinique	3–2	Costa Rica	10–25	25–21	24–26	25–21	15–12	99–105	P2 P3

==== 5th place match ====
Date	Time		Score		Set 1	Set 2	Set 3	Set 4	Set 5	Total	Report
1 Oct	16:41	Trinidad and Tobago	0–3	Guatemala	18–25	10–25	15–25			43–75	P2 P3

=== Final six ===
Quarterfinals
29 September
Trinidad and Tobago	0
Dominican Republic	3
29 September
United States	3
Costa Rica	0

Semifinals
30 September
Mexico	0
Dominican Republic	3
30 September
Canada	0
United States	3

Final
1 October
Dominican Republic	0
United States	3
3rd place match
1 October
Mexico	1
Canada	3

==== Quarterfinals ====
Date	Time		Score		Set 1	Set 2	Set 3	Set 4	Set 5	Total	Report
29 Sep	17:00	Trinidad and Tobago	0–3	Dominican Republic	18–25	22–25	21–25			61–75	P2 P3
29 Sep	19:00	United States	3–0	Costa Rica	25–11	25–7	25–8			75–26	P2 P3

==== Semifinals ====
Date	Time		Score		Set 1	Set 2	Set 3	Set 4	Set 5	Total	Report
30 Sep	17:48	Mexico	0–3	Dominican Republic	20–25	23–25	23–25			66–75	P2 P3
30 Sep	19:25	Canada	0–3	United States	20–25	22–25	21–25			63–75	P2 P3

==== 3rd place match ====
Date	Time		Score		Set 1	Set 2	Set 3	Set 4	Set 5	Total	Report
1 Oct	15:00	Mexico	1–3	Canada	25–21	13–25	25–27	18–25		81–98	P2 P3

==== Final ====
Date	Time		Score		Set 1	Set 2	Set 3	Set 4	Set 5	Total	Report
1 Oct	17:32	Dominican Republic	0–3	United States	17–25	10–25	12–25			39–75	P2 P3

== Final standing ==
Rank	Team
1st place, gold medalist(s)	United States
2nd place, silver medalist(s)	Dominican Republic
3rd place, bronze medalist(s)	Canada
4	Mexico
5	Guatemala
6	Trinidad and Tobago
7	Martinique
8	Costa Rica
9	Saint Vincent and the Grenadines
10	Saint Lucia

Qualified for the 2018 World Championship
Qualified for the 2018 World Championship NORCECA Qualification Final four

2017 Men's NORCECA champions

United States
9th title

14–man roster
Anderson, Russell, Sander, Stahl, K. Shoji, Jaeschke, Christenson (c), McDonnell, Patch, Clark, Holt, Smith, Watten, E. Shoji
Head coach
Speraw

== Awards ==
- Most valuable player
  (United States) Micah Christenson
- Best scorer
  (Costa Rica) Alberto Blanco
- Best server
  (Martinique) Joann Breleur
- Best digger
  (Costa Rica) Luis Chávez
- Best receiver
  (Mexico) Jorge Barajas
- Best setter
  (Mexico) Pedro Rangel
- Best outside spikers
  (United States) Aaron Russell
  (Canada) Stephen Maar
- Best middle blockers
  (Mexico) José Martínez
  (Guatemala) Leonel Antonio Aragon
- Best opposite spiker
  (Canada) Sharone Vernon-Evans
- Best libero
  (Costa Rica) Luis Chávez

== See also ==
- 2017 Women's NORCECA Volleyball Championship
