= Volleyball at the 2013 Pacific Mini Games =

Volleyball at the 2013 Pacific Mini Games was held at Kafika Hall. Competition took place from 3 to 11 September 2013.

== Medal table ==
* Host nation (Wallis and Futuna)

Rank	Nation	Gold	Silver	Bronze	Total
1	French Polynesia (TAH)	1	0	0	1
1	Papua New Guinea (PNG)	1	0	0	1
3	New Caledonia (NCL)	0	1	1	2
4	Wallis and Futuna (WLF)*	0	1	0	1
5	Fiji (FIJ)	0	0	1	1
Totals (5 entries)		2	2	2	6

== Medal summary ==
Event	Gold	Silver	Bronze
Men	Papua New Guinea	Wallis and Futuna	New Caledonia
Women	Tahiti	New Caledonia	Fiji
