= Papua New Guinea women's national volleyball team =

National sports team

Papua New Guinea
- Association: Papua New Guinea Volleyball Federation
- Confederation: AVC
- FIVB ranking: NR (2 October 2026)

Uniforms
Home	Away

The Papua New Guinea women's national volleyball team represents Papua New Guinea in international women's volleyball competitions and friendly matches.

The team appeared at the Pacific Games several times.
