= New Caledonia women's national volleyball team =

Women's national volleyball team representing New Caledonia

New Caledonia
- Association: New Caledonia Volleyball Federation
- FIVB ranking: NR (2 October 2026)

Uniforms
Home

The New Caledonia women's national volleyball team represents New Caledonia in international women's volleyball competitions and friendly matches.

It is one of the dominant teams at the Pacific Games.
