= Guam women's national volleyball team =

National sports team

Guam
- Association: Guam Volleyball Federation
- Confederation: AVC
- FIVB ranking: 114 (2 October 2026)

Uniforms
Home	Away

The Guam women's national volleyball team represents Guam in international women's volleyball competitions and friendly matches.

The team appeared at the Pacific Games several times.
