= Fiji men's national volleyball team =

National volleyball team

Fiji
- Association: Fiji Volleyball Federation
- Confederation: AVC
- Head coach: Emori Bakewa
- FIVB ranking: NR (5 October 2025)

Uniforms
Home	Away

The Fiji men's national volleyball team represents Fiji (Republic of Fiji) in international volleyball competitions and friendly matches. The team is currently ranked 141st in the world. However, Fiji is currently not ranked in the Fédération Internationale de Volleyball. Fiji participates in the Pacific Games.

== Current Team ==
As of 2018:

- Epeli Nawalu (Captain)
- Temipale Finau (Co-Vice Captain)
- Mosese Cola (Co-Vice Captain)
- Jope Tokalauvere
- Josua Vulimailodoni
- Nacanieli Rabuku
- Timoci Draunibaka Qio
- Ratu Manasa Rogoivalu
- Vilimoni Rokomurimuri
- Nacanieli Goneyali
- Timoci Buasara
- Head Coach: Emori Bakewa
