= Taekwondo at the Pacific Games =

Taekwondo competition

Taekwondo at the Pacific Games has been contested since 1995 when it was introduced for the tenth edition at Papeete, Tahiti. Women's taekwondo was added in 1999 for the games held in Guam.

The men's and women's individual competitions have eight weight classes each in accordance with World Taekwondo classifications as of 2019. There are also teams events for men's and women's competition.

Taekwondo has been included in the Pacific Mini Games, starting with the ninth edition at Wallis and Futuna in 2013.

== Pacific Games ==
The taekwondo weight classes contested at each Pacific Games are listed in the table below. Flag icons and three letter country code indicate the nationality of the gold medal winner of an event, where this information is known; otherwise an (X) is used. Moving the cursor onto a country code with a dotted underline will reveal the name of the gold medal winner. A dash (–) indicates a weight division that was not contested.

=== Men's events ===
Games		Host city	Kyorugi weight class								Team	Total medal events	Refs
Games		Host city	Fin	Fly	Bantam	Feather	Light	Welter	Middle	Heavy	event	Total medal events	Refs
			50 kg	54 kg	58 kg	64 kg	70 kg	76 kg	83 kg	83 kg+			
X	1995	Papeete	TAH	PNG	TAH	TAH	NCL	NCL	TAH	TAH	TAH	9	
			54 kg	58 kg	62 kg	67 kg	72 kg	78 kg	84 kg	84 kg+			
XI	1999	Santa Rita	PNG	GUM	GUM	NCL	NCL	PNG	TAH	–	PNG	8	
XII	2003	Suva	TAH	PNG	TAH	PNG	TAH	TAH	TGA	NCL	TAH	9	
XIII	2007	Apia	TAH	NCL	NCL	TAH	TGA	TAH	NCL	SAM	TAH	9	
			54 kg	58 kg	63 kg	68 kg	74 kg	80 kg	87 kg	87 kg+			
XIV	2011	Nouméa	X	X	X	X	X	X	X	X	TAH	9	
XV	2015	Port Moresby	X	X	X	X	X	X	X	X	TAH	9	
XVI	2019	Apia	AUS	AUS	AUS	AUS	AUS	AUS	TGA	AUS	TGA	9	

=== Women's events ===
Games		Host city	Kyorugi weight class								Team	Total medal events	Refs
Games		Host city	Fin	Fly	Bantam	Feather	Light	Welter	Middle	Heavy	event	Total medal events	Refs
X	1995	Papeete	No women's taekwondo competition in 1995										
			49 kg		57 kg		67 kg		67 kg+				
XI	1999	Santa Rita	NCL		GUM		NCL		–		–	3	
XII	2003	Suva	NCL		SOL		TAH		NCL		–	4	
XIII	2007	Apia	TAH		TAH		WLF		NCL		–	4	
			46 kg	49 kg	53 kg	57 kg	62 kg	67 kg	73 kg	73 kg+			
XIV	2011	Nouméa	–	X	X	X	X	X	X	X	PNG	8	
XV	2015	Port Moresby	X	X	X	X	X	X	X	X	TAH	9	
XVI	2019	Apia	AUS	AUS	AUS	AUS	AUS	AUS	AUS	AUS	TGA	9	

== Pacific Mini Games ==
=== Men ===
Games		Host city	Kyorugi weight class								Team	Total medal events	Refs
Games		Host city	Fin	Fly	Bantam	Feather	Light	Welter	Middle	Heavy	event	Total medal events	Refs
I – VIII			No taekwondo competition at the Mini Games 1981–2009										
			54 kg	58 kg	63 kg	68 kg	74 kg	80 kg	87 kg	87 kg+			
IX	2013	Mata-Utu	TAH	TAH	MHL	VAN	TAH	WLF	TAH	TAH	TAH	9	

=== Women ===
Games		Host city	Kyorugi weight class								Team	Total medal events	Refs
Games		Host city	Fin	Fly	Bantam	Feather	Light	Welter	Middle	Heavy	event	Total medal events	Refs
I – VIII			No taekwondo competition at the Mini Games 1981–2009										
			46 kg	49 kg	53 kg	57 kg	62 kg	67 kg	73 kg	73 kg+			
IX	2013	Mata-Utu	–	TAH	PNG	–	TAH	TAH	–	TAH	TAH	6	
