= Outrigger canoeing at the 2007 South Pacific Games =

Outrigger canoeing at the 2007 South Pacific Games was held from 4–8 September 2007 at Mulifanoua Reserve, Aggies Greys Resort in Samoa. Tahiti dominated the competition winning all ten gold medals.

== Medal summary ==
=== Medal table ===
Rank	Nation	Gold	Silver	Bronze	Total
1	French Polynesia (TAH)	10	0	0	10
2	New Caledonia (NCL)	0	5	3	8
3	Cook Islands (COK)	0	3	3	6
4	Fiji (FIJ)	0	2	3	5
5	Samoa (SAM)	0	0	1	1
Totals (5 entries)		10	10	10	30

=== Men's Results ===
Event	Gold		Silver		Bronze	
V1 500 m	Pubois Taaroa (TAH)	2:43.62	Anthony Halapua (FIJ)	2:50.07	Christophe Tuhiarii (NCL)	2:52.98
V6 500 m	Tahiti	1:57.90	New Caledonia	2:00.65	Samoa	2:02.17
V6 2500 m	Tahiti	10:49.23	New Caledonia	10:51.70	Cook Islands	10:55.01
V1 - 15 km (time= h:min:s)	(TAH)	1:19:41	(COK)	1:23:37	(NCL)	1:27:34
V6 - 30 km (time= h:min:s)	Tahiti	2:33:56	New Caledonia	2:38:42	Cook Islands	2:46:08

=== Women's Results ===
Event	Gold		Silver		Bronze	
V1 500 m	Evangelique Tehiva (TAH)	3:19.96	Terii Rosemelle (NCL)	3:22.32	Lorraine Patterson (FIJ)	3:24.21
V6 500 m	Tahiti	2:28.89	Cook Islands	2:32.75	Fiji	2:33.78
V6 2500 m	Tahiti	12:17.01	Fiji	12:26.96	New Caledonia	12:53.39
V1 10 km (time= h:min:s)	Evangelique Tehiva (TAH)	1:05:41	(NCL)	1:06:44	Serena Hunter (COK)	1:09:03
V6 20 km (time= h:min:s)	Tahiti	1:54:03	Cook Islands	1:58:29	Fiji	2:00:04
