= Australian Survivor season 3 =

Australian Survivor
- Season 3
- Presented by: Jonathan LaPaglia
- No. of days: 55
- No. of castaways: 24
- Winner: Kristie Bennett
- Runner-up: Lee Carseldine
- Location: Upolu, Samoa
- No. of episodes: 26

Release
- Original network: Network Ten
- Original release: 21 August – 25 October 2016

Additional information
- Filming dates: 23 May – 18 July 2016

Season chronology
- ← Previous; Celebrity Survivor: Vanuatu (on the Seven Network) Next → Season 4 (2017)

The third season of Australian Survivor is a television series based on the international reality competition franchise Survivor. This season, announced by Ten in November 2015, is the third Australian edition of the program, the second to feature non-celebrity contestants and the first to air on Network Ten. The first season aired on the Nine Network in 2002, while the second season (a celebrity edition) aired in 2006 on the Seven Network. This season gives Australian Survivor the rare distinction of being one of the few Australian programs to have aired across all three commercial networks in Australia.

The season was filmed in Samoa from May to July 2016 and premiered on 21 August 2016 on Network Ten. Hosted by actor Jonathan LaPaglia, the program featured 24 Australian castaways competing for 55 days for a grand prize of A$500,000. After 55 days on the island, Kristie Bennett was named the "Sole Survivor" and awarded the grand prize over former professional cricketer Lee Carseldine by a jury vote of 8–1.

== Production ==
=== Conception ===
After Australian Celebrity Survivor was not renewed by the Seven Network, a third season of Australian Survivor appeared unlikely. However, in August 2013, the creator of the Survivor format, Charlie Parsons revealed in an interview with fan website and podcast Survivor Oz that the rights to produce Australian Survivor had been licensed to an undisclosed production company. The company who believed that there was an appetite for the program and would be approaching Australian networks to commission the potential series.

On 19 November 2015, Network Ten revealed at their upfronts that they would be commissioning a revival of Australian Survivor to air in mid-late 2016. They also announced that Endemol Shine Australia would be producing the series in association with Castaway Television.

=== Twists ===
This season of Australian Survivor introduced several elements from international editions of Survivor, including: hidden immunity idols, small trinkets that, when played on a castaway after the votes were cast at Tribal Council but before they were read, negated all votes cast against them at that Tribal Council; the ability to prohibit another player from voting at a single Tribal Council, as offered during the season's Survivor Auction; and Exile Beach, where a small number of castaways were banished to a separate beach for a predetermined amount of time, and given minimal tools for survival.

=== Casting ===
With the announcement of the series in November 2015, a casting call was made for potential contestants. Applicants for the series were required to be 18 years of age or older, be Australian citizens or permanent residents and be able to swim. More than 5,000 people applied within the first week of casting being opened, and 7,500 had applied before the year's end. Submissions eventually reached 15,000 before the 10 February deadline, making it the largest pool of applicants for a Network Ten reality program.

=== Filming and development ===
The season was rumored to be filmed in Samoa as early as March, and was officially confirmed on 9 May by LaPaglia in a radio interview on the Hamish & Andy show. The season was filmed on the island of Upolu, the same location used in four seasons of the Survivor US: Samoa, Heroes vs. Villains, South Pacific and One World. In total, 250 Australians and at least 180 Samoan locals worked on the program, including Trent Pattison, who has previously worked as a challenge producer on the American edition as well as Ten's own I'm a Celebrity...Get Me Out of Here!.

=== Broadcast ===
Australian Survivor was initially scheduled to air twice a week, with new episodes airing on Sunday and Monday at 7:30pm. However, following the first week, a third weekly episode — set to air Tuesdays at 7:30pm — was added to the schedule. The move was a means to both increase the exposure to the series to potential viewers and to increase the competitiveness of Ten's Tuesday schedule following low ratings for the previous programs airing in the 7:30pm slot, Modern Family and Life in Pieces.

In addition to the main show, a 9-part companion program, titled The Jury Villa, was released online through tenplay. Based on the similar Ponderosa series from the American show, the web series follows the last nine castaways to be voted off as they become members of the Tribal Council Jury and interact with one another and discuss the game in the villa. Episodes began airing after episode 17 and were uploaded following the airing of subsequent episodes.

=== Promotion ===
The primary sponsorships for the season include Hungry Jack's, AHM Health Insurance and Holden.

== Contestants ==
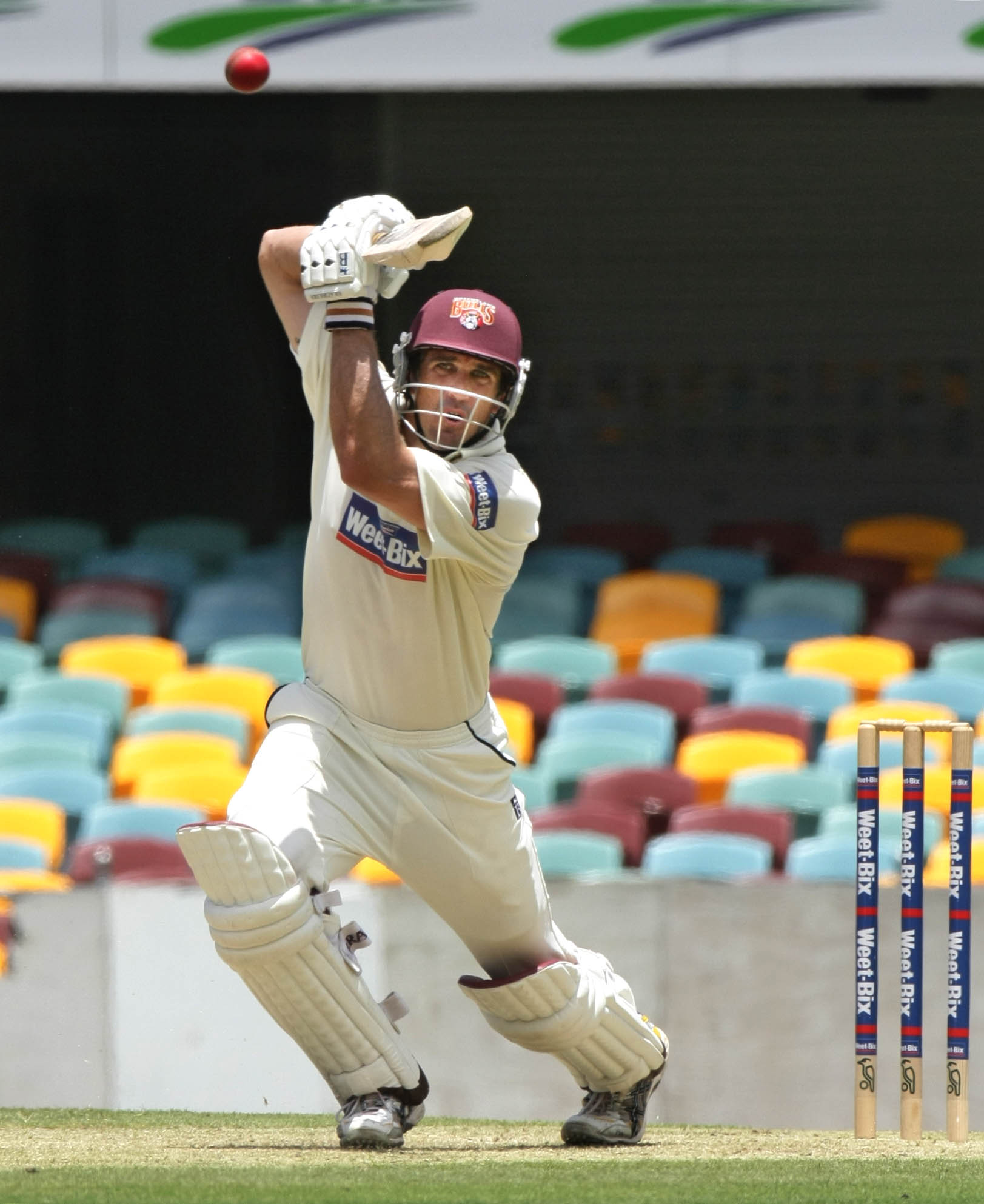
Lee Carseldine

The 24 castaways were initially divided into three tribes of eight, each named after a beach in Samoa: Aganoa, Saanapu and Vavau. On Day 12, two castaways each from Saanapu and Vavau swapped tribes as a result of a special joint Tribal Council in which the tribes unknowingly voted to switch a member of their tribe to the other; the switched castaways each brought a tribe member with them. After winning the reward challenge on Day 19, Saanapu earned the right to redistribute the 18 remaining castaways into two tribes of nine, and Aganoa was officially disbanded. For winning the immunity challenge on Day 29, Saanapu sent an observer to Vavau's Tribal Council where, instead of a vote, the observer was to "kidnap" one of the Vavau tribe members, bringing them back to Saanapu as an official member.

On Day 32, the 13 remaining castaways merged into the Fia Fia tribe, named after the Samoan term for "celebration". The final 11 players comprised the two finalists and the nine members of the jury, who voted to decide which of the two finalists should be the "Sole Survivor" and be awarded the grand prize.

List of Australian Survivor season 3 contestants
Contestant	Original tribe	Swapped tribe	Dissolved tribe	Post-kidnap tribe	Merged tribe	Finish
Des Quilty; 59, Sunshine Coast, QLD	Aganoa					1st voted out Day 2
Bianca Anderson; 36, Melbourne, VIC	Saanapu					2nd voted out Day 5
Evan Jones; 30, Melbourne, VIC	Aganoa					3rd voted out Day 8
Peter Fiegehen; 62, Canberra, ACT	Saanapu					Quit (Medical); Day 10
Barry Lea; 44, Cairns, QLD	Vavau	Vavau				4th voted out Day 14
Tegan Haining; 33, Sydney, NSW	Vavau	Saanapu				5th voted out Day 17
Rohan MacLaren; 28, Melbourne, VIC	Aganoa	Aganoa	Vavau			6th voted out Day 21
Katherine "Kat" Dumont; 26, Perth, WA	Aganoa	Aganoa	Vavau			7th voted out Day 23
Andrew Torrens; 29, Brisbane, QLD	Vavau	Vavau	Vavau			8th voted out Day 25
Craig I'Anson; 32, Brisbane, QLD	Vavau	Vavau	Vavau			9th voted out Day 27
Phoebe Timmins; 27, Sydney, NSW	Aganoa	Aganoa	Vavau	Vavau		10th voted out Day 31
Conner Bethune; 23, Canberra, ACT	Saanapu	Vavau	Vavau	Vavau	Fia Fia	11th voted out Day 33
Kate Campbell; 28, Perth, WA	Vavau	Vavau	Vavau	Vavau	Fia Fia	12th voted out Day 35
Nick Iadanza; 28, Adelaide, SA	Vavau	Saanapu	Saanapu	Saanapu	Fia Fia	13th voted out 1st jury member Day 37
Kylie Evans; 38, Melbourne, VIC	Saanapu	Saanapu	Saanapu	Saanapu	Fia Fia	14th voted out 2nd jury member Day 39
Sue Clarke; 59, Perth, WA	Vavau	Vavau	Vavau	Saanapu	Fia Fia	15th voted out 3rd jury member Day 41
Jennah-Louise Salkeld; 27, Gold Coast, QLD	Vavau	Vavau	Saanapu	Saanapu	Fia Fia	16th voted out 4th jury member Day 43
Brooke Jowett; 23, Melbourne, VIC	Saanapu	Saanapu	Saanapu	Saanapu	Fia Fia	17th voted out 5th jury member Day 45
Sam Webb; 28, Sydney, NSW	Saanapu	Vavau	Saanapu	Saanapu	Fia Fia	18th voted out 6th jury member Day 49
Matt Tarrant; 29, Adelaide, SA	Saanapu	Saanapu	Saanapu	Saanapu	Fia Fia	19th voted out 7th jury member Day 51
Felicity "Flick" Egginton; 23, Gold Coast, QLD	Saanapu	Saanapu	Saanapu	Saanapu	Fia Fia	20th voted out 8th jury member Day 53
Elena "El" Rowland; 33, Brisbane, QLD	Aganoa	Aganoa	Saanapu	Saanapu	Fia Fia	21st voted out 9th jury member Day 54
Lee Carseldine; 40, Brisbane, QLD	Aganoa	Aganoa	Saanapu	Saanapu	Fia Fia	Runner-up; Day 55
Kristie Bennett; 24, Sydney, NSW	Aganoa	Aganoa	Vavau	Vavau	Fia Fia	Sole Survivor; Day 55

=== Future appearances ===
In 2020, Phoebe Timmons, Nick Iadanza, Brooke Jowett, Felicity "Flick" Egginton and Lee Carseldine competed on Australian Survivor: All Stars,

In 2023, Sam Webb competed as a hero on Australian Survivor: Heroes V Villains .

In 2026, Jowett competed on Australian Survivor: Redemption.

Outside of Survivor, Brooke Jowett has competed on The Challenge: Australia in 2022. Matt Tarrant competed on the tenth season of Australia's Got Talent in 2022.

== Season summary ==
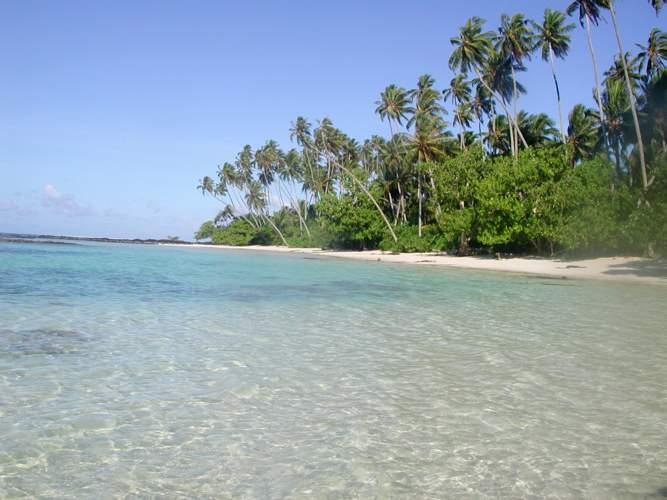
The season filmed in Upolu in Samoa.

The game began with three tribes of eight, and in each, a majority alliance was formed. On Saanapu, Flick and Brooke recruited Sam, Matt, and Conner. On Vavau, Craig, Andrew, Sue, and Jennah-Louise joined forces. And on Aganoa, Evan aligned with Phoebe, Rohan, Lee, and El, but drama from the idol clue twist between him and Rohan would see the alliance turn on Evan. On Day 12, a Fake Double Tribal Council consisting of Vavau and Saanapu occurred; Conner and Nick were voted out, but instead of leaving the game, were switched to the other tribe and they brought Sam and Tegan with them respectively.

On Day 19, with 18 contestants remaining, a Reward Challenge won by Saanapu gave them the power to decide which tribe between Vavau and Saanapu to stay on. After the five remaining Saanapu remembers chose to stay at Saanapu, they then had the power to choose their remaining members. They selected Sam, El, and Lee for their challenge strength as well as Jennah-Louise with the intention of voting her off. The game became one-sided after the swap, as not only did the stronger Saanapu tribe dominate in challenges but Phoebe's idol plays ousted the two strongest members of Vavau in Rohan and Craig. After a fake Tribal Council spared Kristie, Phoebe's ally whom she threw under the bus to save herself, Brooke further decimated Vavau by adding Sue to her tribe. Phoebe would be voted out at the next Tribal, and the tribes would merge at 13.

The Saanapu alliance, with the original members of Flick, Brooke, Matt, and Sam at the core and with the help of members from post-swap Saanapu, would vote out the remnants of post-swap Vavau as well as outsiders from Saanapu up until the final 7. At that point, Flick viewed Brooke as too big of a threat and flipped to Lee, El, and Kristie to vote out her best friend. Despite El and Lee's obvious strong bond, Flick and Kristie did not flip back and voted out Sam and Matt. At that point Flick tried to force a 2-2 tiebreaker but Kristie still would not flip and Flick would go home. Despite not having won a previous individual challenge, Kristie won the Final Immunity Challenge and voted El out. At Final Tribal Council, despite Lee having more control of the game, Kristie's underdog status and the fruition of her floater strategy resulted in her receiving 8 of the 9 jury votes and becoming the "Sole Survivor".

Challenge winners and eliminations by episode

Tribal phase (Day 1–31)
Episode		Challenge winner(s)		Eliminated	Finish
No.	Air date	Reward	Immunity	Eliminated	Finish
1	21 August 2016	Saanapu	Saanapu	Des	1st voted out Day 2
1	21 August 2016	Saanapu	Vavau	Des	1st voted out Day 2
2	22 August 2016	Vavau (Note: Combined reward and immunity challenge.)		Bianca	2nd voted out Day 5
2	22 August 2016	Aganoa		Bianca	2nd voted out Day 5
3	28 August 2016	Vavau	Vavau	Evan	3rd voted out Day 8
3	28 August 2016	Saanapu	Saanapu	Evan	3rd voted out Day 8
4	29 August 2016	None	Saanapu	Peter	Quit; Day 10
4	29 August 2016	None	Vavau	Peter	Quit; Day 10
5	30 August 2016	Saanapu	Aganoa	No elimination on Day 12 due to a vote to exchange tribe members. (Note: Instead of voting out players, the two losing tribes unknowingly voted to send a member to the other tribe, who in turn brought another tribemate with them. Saanapu voted out Conner who brought Sam with him to Vavau; Vavau voted out Nick who brought Tegan with him to Saanapu)	
5	30 August 2016	Aganoa	Aganoa	No elimination on Day 12 due to a vote to exchange tribe members.	
6	4 September 2016	None	Saanapu	Barry	4th voted out Day 14
6	4 September 2016	None	Aganoa	Barry	4th voted out Day 14
7	5 September 2016	Saanapu	Aganoa	Tegan	5th voted out Day 17
7	5 September 2016	Vavau	Vavau	Tegan	5th voted out Day 17
8	6 September 2016	Saanapu (Note: For winning this reward challenge, Saanapu won the power to re-distribute the remaining castaways into two tribes. Everyone on Saanapu elected to stay on the Saanapu tribe, while also choosing Jennah-Louise, Sam, El and Lee to join them. Everyone else formed the new Vavau tribe. The Aganoa tribe was Diseolved.)	No immunity challenge or Tribal Council following the Tribe Swap & Dissolve.		
9	11 September 2016	Saanapu	Saanapu	Rohan	6th voted out Day 21
10	12 September 2016	None	Saanapu	Kat	7th voted out Day 23
11	13 September 2016	Saanapu	Saanapu	Andrew	8th voted out Day 25
12	18 September 2016	None	Saanapu	Craig	9th voted out Day 27
13	19 September 2016	Saanapu	Saanapu	No elimination on Day 29 due to kidnapping. (Note: Vavau was told that they would not be voting at Tribal Council but instead Brooke, the chosen observer from Saanapu, was told to kidnap one member of Vavau and bring them to Saanapu. She choose Sue.)	
14	20 September 2016	Saanapu		Phoebe	10th voted out Day 31

Individual phase (Day 32–55)
Episode		Challenge winner(s)		Eliminated	Finish
No.	Air date	Reward	Immunity	Eliminated	Finish
15	25 September 2016	Survivor; Auction	Brooke	Conner	11th voted out Day 33
16	26 September 2016	None	El	Kate	12th voted out Day 35
17	27 September 2016	~~El~~, ~~Kristie~~, (Note: Kristie did not participate in the challenge after not being chosen for a team, but she had correctly guessed the winning team and, as a result, joined them on the reward.); Kylie, Lee, Nick, Sam (Flick, Matt) (Note: El and Kristie won reward but chose to give up their reward to Flick and Matt, respectively.)	Kylie	Nick	13th voted out 1st jury member Day 37
18	3 October 2016	None	Jennah-Louise	Kylie	14th voted out 2nd jury member Day 39
19	4 October 2016	Brooke, El, Lee, Sam, Sue (Note: Sue did not participate in the challenge after she drew the white rock but she correctly guessed the winning team and, as a result, joined them on the reward.)	Jennah-Louise	Sue	15th voted out 3rd jury member Day 41
20	9 October 2016	None	Brooke	Jennah-Louise	16th voted out 4th jury member Day 43
21	10 October 2016	Sam [Lee]	Lee	Brooke	17th voted out 5th jury member Day 45
22	16 October 2016	Matt (Note: Two separate reward challenges were held in this episode, with the winners of both challenges jointly selecting a third castaway to enjoy the reward with them; Matt and Flick chose to share their reward with Kristie.)	No immunity challenge or elimination due to a second reward challenge held at Tribal Council.		
22	16 October 2016	Flick	No immunity challenge or elimination due to a second reward challenge held at Tribal Council.		
22	16 October 2016	[Kristie]	No immunity challenge or elimination due to a second reward challenge held at Tribal Council.		
23	17 October 2016	El, Lee, Sam	Lee	Sam	18th voted out 6th jury member Day 49
24	23 October 2016	None	Lee	Matt	19th voted out 7th jury member Day 51
25	24 October 2016	None	El	Flick	20th voted out 8th jury member Day 53
26	25 October 2016	None	Kristie	El	21st voted out 9th jury member Day 54
26	25 October 2016			Final vote	
26	25 October 2016			Lee	Runner-up; Day 55
26	25 October 2016			Kristie	Sole Survivor; Day 55

In the case of multiple tribes or castaways who win reward or immunity, they are listed in order of finish, or alphabetically where it was a team effort; where one castaway won and invited others, the invitees are in brackets.

=== Episodes ===
No. overall	No. in season	Title	Timeline	Original release date
26	1	" I Always Wanted to Play the Villain"	Days 1–2	21 August 2016
The 24 castaways were divided into three tribes of eight — Aganoa, Saanapu and Vavau — and immediately given their first challenge.: Reward challenge: The tribes ransacked a platform for supplies and loaded them onto a canoe. They then paddled their canoe to the second platform; the first player to light the torch on the second platform won fire, in the form of a lit torch, for their tribe.; Sam won the challenge for Saanapu; at camp, the tribe flourished due to their early victory. Bianca, a private investigator, told her tribe she worked in insurance to avoid suspicion. Conner burned his hand while tending to the fire but was helped by firefighter Kylie, and he later aligned with Flick. At Vavau, Nick took an early leadership role, and was able to encourage good morale despite early struggles; the tribe ended the day with a shelter. At Aganoa, Kat took the lead in building the shelter while Des slacked off, and the two argued. Though Des had had survival training from his time in the army, he refused to share it with his tribe-mates. The tribe was unable to build a fire or shelter before nightfall; they tried sleeping on the sand near the ocean for warmth but were woken up due to the high tide, which washed away their entire camp.: Immunity challenge: Six members of each tribe raced up and down two A-frames and a net wall, releasing a rope at the top, then navigated a series of small platforms using two planks. They then used the rope to pull a heavy wooden crate filled with puzzle pieces across the course. The other two tribemates then used the pieces to solve a puzzle; the first pair to complete it won immunity for their tribe.; Saanapu and Vavau won the challenge, earning an additional reward of fire in the form of flint, while Aganoa lost after Des and Kat struggled on the puzzle. Back at camp, Des scrambled to survive the vote and targeted Kat, while Kat rallied the women against Des. To save himself, Des used his army training to help his tribe build the shelter, and alerted the other men to the possibility of a women's alliance. Evan and Kristie considered teaming up, as both were wary about teaming up along gender lines and unsure about whom to eliminate. However, at Tribal Council, the entire tribe came together and voted Des out; the Aganoa tribe received flint before heading back to camp.
27	2	" Paranoia Will Do Crazy Things To You"	Days 3-5	22 August 2016
After the Aganoa tribe had returned from Tribal Council, Kristie was unable to find her bag and accused her tribe of hiding it on purpose. Kristie's paranoia set the rest of the tribe against her, but El later comforted her. Evan tried forming an alliance with El, Lee, Phoebe, and Rohan, but Lee and Phoebe didn't fully trust him due to his constant strategizing. At Saanapu, Bianca plotted with Kylie to break up Brooke and Flick, who had quickly formed a close bond. Peter, the tribe's oldest member, was suffering from a gastro-intestinal infection and was progressively weakening due to lack of food. Following many struggles, the Vavau tribe succeeded in making a fire under Nick's leadership.: Reward/Immunity challenge: Two tribemates, deemed the "sacrificial lambs," were shackled and harnessed to a rope while five other tribemates manoeuvred them through an obstacle course. The "sacrificial lambs" were unshackled after finishing the course; they then used spiked clubs to release a crate of sandbags and threw the sandbags to knock wooden blocks off a table. The first two tribes to knock all their blocks off the table won immunity; the first-place tribe also earned a fishing kit, completed with spears, a snorkel and a tackle box, while the second-place tribe received hooks and fishing line.; Saanapu blew their lead, and Vavau and Aganoa won the challenge. Back at the Saanapu camp, Peter considered quitting the game for being a liability to his tribe; while Kylie decided to grant his wish, Bianca tried to recruit Conner to vote out Flick. However, Conner exposed Bianca's and her motives to Flick, and an alliance formed between Brooke, Conner, Flick, Matt and Sam. At Tribal Council, the alliance of five voted out Bianca.
28	3	" A Little Jaunty Rhyme"	Days 6-8	28 August 2016
After Saanapu had returned from Tribal Council, Peter was upset with his tribemates for not voting him out due to his poor health, while outsider Kylie lamented the loss of her closest ally, Bianca. The next day, the tribes were instructed to pick their wisest member, who would then select a partner to join them to make a private decision. The pairs were privately offered a choice between a big bag of beans for their tribe or a smaller bag of beans and a clue to a hidden immunity idol. Saanapu chose Peter who picked Kylie, and they elected to take the clue. The majority alliance later realised that they had just given the tribe's only outsiders access to private information. Aganoa picked Phoebe and Rohan; they picked the clue, and Rohan agreed to give the idol to Phoebe if they found it. Back at camp, they lied to their tribemates about the choices they were given, but Evan didn't believe them; he later found the clue, which had fallen out of Rohan's waistband. Evan shared the clue with El and Lee, but El told Phoebe and Rohan about Evan's discovery. Rohan and Evan later argued about the clue. Vavau chose Nick who brought Tegan, and they also chose the clue. They decided to tell their tribemates about the clue but lied about its contents, though no one believed them. Nick told Craig and Sue that he had lied, but his tribemates still distrusted him.: Reward challenge: The tribes paddled canoes to a crate in the water; on their way back to shore, they hooked a rope onto four buoys attached to nets. Upon reaching the shore, they used the rope to pull the nets to shore, and retrieved blocks from inside the nets. The first two tribes to build a freestanding stack with all their blocks won reward: the first-place tribe won pillows, chairs, blankets, a tarp and a hammock, while the second-place tribe won a tarp.; Vavau placed first, and Saanapu placed second. The disappointed Aganoa tribemates blamed Kat for their loss, and a worried Evan hunted for the hidden immunity idol.: Immunity challenge: Five members relay raced up a platform and across a net to a large wooden fence, which they climbed to retrieve puzzle pieces. The two other competitors then used the pieces to solve a puzzle; the first two tribes to finish their puzzle won immunity.; Aganoa lost yet another challenge after Evan and Kat struggled on the puzzle. The alliance of El, Lee, Phoebe and Rohan debated between voting out Evan or Kat; Lee pushed to vote Kat out for her repeatedly poor challenge performances, but Phoebe and El plotted against Evan for being untrustworthy and as to not go against their women's alliance with Kristie and Kat. At Tribal Council, Kat called out the alliance of El, Lee, Phoebe and Rohan, but while Evan and Lee voted against Kat, the rest of the tribe voted Evan out; as he left, he told Rohan to "use the idol well."
29	4	" A Real Mad Moral Dilemma"	Days 9-10	29 August 2016
After voting Evan out, Phoebe celebrated her good position in the Aganoa tribe due to her two alliances: the women's alliance with El, Kat and Kristie, and her other alliance with El, Lee and Rohan. Rohan found the hidden immunity idol with Phoebe, and they decided not to tell anyone else; Rohan decided to hold onto the idol, reneging on the earlier deal he made with Phoebe, which roused her ire. At Saanapu, Peter's health continued to worsen; he helped Kylie look for the idol, though they were unsuccessful. At Vavau, Nick continued trying to regain his tribemates' trust after lying to them about the idol clue. He tried forming an alliance with Craig, Jennah-Louise and Sue, but they still plotted to vote him out. Vavau later struggled after breaking their flint and losing their fire.: Immunity challenge: In pairs, castaways swam out to a cage in the water, climbed a platform and used a grappling hook to retrieve a chest. The pairs then brought the chest back to shore; once all three chests were retrieved, two tribemates used the puzzle pieces inside to solve a puzzle. First two tribes to do so won immunity.; Saanapu placed first and Vavau placed second. Vavau asked host Jonathan for a new flint; he agreed in exchange for all of their rewards, to be exchanged at the next reward challenge. Stuck in the middle of both alliances, El and Phoebe weighed their options between eliminating Kat — a poor challenge performer — or Rohan, who was perceived as untrustworthy. Phoebe told Lee that Rohan had found the idol and was withholding it from him, and the two decided to tell Rohan about voting for Kat, though Kat overheard them. At Tribal Council, El, Lee and Phoebe alluded that they were voting against Kat to prevent Rohan from playing his idol but, right before the vote, the tribe was informed that Peter had quit the game, and the vote was cancelled.
30	5	" Flippity"	Days 11-12	30 August 2016
After Aganoa's Tribal Council vote was cancelled, Kat — the intended target — felt isolated from her tribe. The next day, the women's alliance apologised to Kat, but Phoebe still considered targeting her for being a liability. At Vavau, Nick was unable to find the hidden immunity idol. At Saanapu, Kylie again lamented losing her closest ally in Peter but was able to find the tribe's hidden immunity idol. Flick suspected that Kylie had found the idol, and talked to Matt about voting Conner out instead; Matt told Sam about Flick's plan, of which the two disapproved, while Brooke and Flick later discussed betraying Matt for being untrustworthy. Before the reward challenge, Vavau gave all of their reward items up in exchange for flint.: Reward challenge: The tribes raced out to gather building materials, and then used them to barricade another tribe's tunnel. After a period of time, the tribes returned to their own tunnels, and had to remove the barricades to force themselves and a chicken coop across; the first tribe to do so won a large chicken coop with two egg-laying hens and all of Vavau's rewards — fishing equipment and comfort items — while the second to do so won a smaller chicken coop with one egg-laying hen.; Saanapu placed first, with Aganoa in second. Though Vavau had lost all of their winnings, they quickly made a new fire with their new flint and feasted for the first time in days.: Immunity challenge: Four tribemates manoeuvred a cart through a three-stage obstacle course, filling their cart with coconuts at the end of each stage. After completing all three stages, the other two tribemates used a slingshot to fire the coconuts at targets. The first tribe to knock over all of their targets won immunity, with both losing tribes going to Tribal Council.; Aganoa came from behind to win immunity. At Vavau, Barry said that he would vote based on a hat draw. Craig told Nick that Tegan was their alliance's target but Nick tried to push the vote against Barry for being unpredictable, which prompted Craig and Jennah-Louise to target Nick instead. At Saanapu, Brooke and Flick told Conner and Sam to split the vote between Kylie and Matt. However, Conner, Matt and Sam met up and discussed Flick's lack of loyalty; Conner later confronted Flick about her multiple, conflicting deals, and told her that the men had discussed voting her out. Both tribes attended Tribal Council simultaneously. While Vavau's members claimed the tribe was united, Saanapu openly fought: Kylie openly wore her hidden immunity idol, which Matt called "the dumbest thing [he'd] ever seen", and Flick brought up her earlier conversation with Conner which prompted Conner to reveal all of the tribe's plotting. After casting the ballots, the castaways were informed that the players voted out would not leave the game, but instead, be switched to the other tribe. While Kate, Nick and Tegan voted against Barry, the rest of the tribe — Barry included — voted Nick out of Vavau. Matt's vote against Conner tied Saanapu's vote between Conner and Flick; while he switched his vote to Flick on the revote, Sam switched his vote from Flick to Conner, which tied the vote again. The non-tied tribemates were then tasked with unanimously deciding to send either Conner or Flick to Vavau; Conner volunteered, and his tribemates obliged. Nick and Conner were then instructed to take one of their old tribemates with them: Nick picked Tegan and Conner picked Sam.
31	6	" Welcome To Our Electric Box Of Crayons"	Days 13-14	4 September 2016
Vavau welcomed new members Conner and Sam, who questioned their place in their new tribe. Nick and Tegan adjusted to life at Saanapu, and Nick swore revenge on his former Vavau tribemates, especially Sue; he later aligned with Matt against Flick. Tegan chatted with Brooke about Nick, and they were able to see through his manipulations. At Aganoa, Kristie questioned Phoebe about her loyalty to Rohan, and the two pledged loyalty to their alliance with El.: Immunity challenge: Two tribemates raced out to a frame in the water and retrieved three bags and two bundles of sticks. Back at shore, two other tribemates used the sticks to construct a long, wooden pole and used the pole to retrieve a key beyond a gate. After using the key to unlock the gate, the final two tribemates ran to a table where they built a fire. First two tribes to build a fire high enough to snap a rope and release their flag won immunity.; Vavau lost the challenge after Barry and Craig struggled on the fire-making portion. Kate — the only remaining tribemate who didn't vote against Nick — tried to ingratiate herself with the majority alliance of Andrew, Craig, Jennah-Louise and Sue, and the five decided to take out Conner for being the weaker of their two new tribemates. Conner pledged his loyalty to his new tribemates, and they considered keeping him instead of Barry, who had consciously abstained from strategizing and claimed he would cast votes at random. Andrew later asked Sue if she would be interested in joining with the new additions to vote against Craig. However, at Tribal Council, everyone decided to vote Barry out.
32	7	" Revenge Is On The Cards"	Days 15-17	5 September 2016
After voting Barry out, Jennah-Louise affirmed her majority alliance on Vavau with Andrew, Craig and Sue, with Kate as their fifth and newcomers Conner and Sam outside of the alliance. However, Andrew and Kate separately approached them about aligning in the future. Kate developed an abscess in her armpit. At Saanapu, Nick continued trying to ingratiate himself to his new tribe by fishing and strategizing — devising a plan to split the votes between fellow newcomer Tegan and alliance outsider and idol holder Kylie — but his tribemates found his efforts transparent, and multiple plans to vote him out were discussed.: Reward challenge: Three tribemates rolled on a barrel while holding a rope between two hitching posts, then used the three barrels and two planks to get four tribemates across the course without any part of their bodies touching the ground. The last two tribemates then threw sandbags at the barrels. The first tribe to land a sandbag on all three barrels won a Hungry Jack's burger barbeque complete with soft drinks, the second tribe to win won a Whopper Jr. burger for each member of the tribe.; Saanapu placed first, with Vavau in second with both enjoying their rewards. Aganoa was upset about their continued losing streak.: Immunity challenge: One member of each tribe was suspended by a rope over the water, with one other tribemate holding them up; the other tribemates could take turns holding the rope but were no longer allowed to compete in the challenge once they were tagged out. The first tribe to drop their suspended tribemate was sent to Tribal Council.; Saanapu cycled through all of their players with Matt dropping Brooke, sending Saanapu to Tribal Council. A doctor looked at the abscess in Kate's armpit but, after incision and drainage, she was cleared to remain in the game. At Saanapu, Nick and Tegan targeted Kylie while Brooke, Flick and Kylie targeted Nick. However, Kylie was wary and considered playing her idol, while Matt pushed to keep Nick due to needing his strength in challenges. At Tribal Council, Kylie played her hidden immunity idol which negated Nick and Tegan's votes against her, while the four original Saanapu members split their votes between Nick and Tegan. On the revote, Tegan was unanimously voted out.
33	8	" Game Changing Advantage"	Days 18-19	6 September 2016
After Tribal Council, Matt felt secure in his position within Saanapu and happy that his alliance with Brooke, Flick and Kylie was following his voting strategies. Brooke and Flick, however, weren't happy with the idea that Matt was in control. At Aganoa, Kat's dislike of Rohan deepened, a feeling which spread across to Kristie and El. Lee also burnt his sneakers as he was trying to dry them by the fire. At Vavau, Jennah-Louise got stung by a wasp on her foot, but remained happy with her place in the game and her experience so far.: Reward challenge: The tribes used two stepping poles to transfer one tribemate from one platform to another. Then, all five tribemates had to fit on a small platform together; the first tribe to do so won the power to choose the new tribe divisions.; Saanapu won the challenge narrowly ahead of Aganoa. As a result, each tribe member had the opportunity to decide whether they wanted to stay with their old tribe or go to a new one. Each of them decided to stay together on Saanapu. They then chose their four additional members from Aganoa, deciding to pick Sam, Lee, El and Jennah-Louise - the latter being chosen as an easy vote-off. This left with Aganoa being abandoned; the new Vavau was composed of Vavau members Craig, Sue, Andrew, Kate and Conner along with Aganoa members Rohan, Kat, Kristie and Phoebe. At the new Saanapu, the alliance of Matt, Flick and Brooke regrouped and made the plan to keep Sam, Kylie and Nick close so that they could first remove Jennah-Louise and establish control of the tribe from there. Brooke, however, still had her doubts about Matt. Jennah-Louise was very unhappy about her new tribe and had trouble adjusting to her position of power in Vavau to her new place at Saanapu, and guessed correctly that she was brought over because she was an easy vote-out. Jennah-Louise and Nick had an argument in which Nick made it clear that he hadn't forgiven her for voting him out and that she had to live with the consequences of what she'd done. Jennah-Louise tried to explain her reasoning for voting Nick out to him and made her anger about being brought to Saanapu just for revenge and as an easy vote-off clear, but Nick said it was the tribe's decision to have her (not his alone) and she has to be accountable of her actions. Neither Nick or Jennah-Louise were happy with the conversation and Nick swore to make sure that Jennah-Louise would not find a foothold within the tribe to save herself. At the new Vavau tribe, Kat felt incredibly happy to have an opportunity to reassert her game and possibly vote out Rohan. While at the feast to celebrate their new tribes, Craig took a napkin which contained a note that he put straight into his bag. Phoebe was paranoid because she was in a minority in her new tribe with five other Vavau members and concerned that while she could trust Rohan and Kristie, Kat would flip. Phoebe's fears were confirmed when Kat went to Kate and told her of the strong alliance between Phoebe and Rohan, and that she was confident that Rohan has a hidden immunity idol. This information quickly found its way around the former Vavau members, and Kat made it clear that she had no issues with picking off the former Aganoa members as a way of gaining a power position in her new tribe.
34	9	" Divided"	Days 20-21	11 September 2016
At Vavau, Craig began his search for the hidden immunity idol while Phoebe was working really hard, but unsuccessfully, on keeping Kat close so that she wouldn't flip. Meanwhile, Jennah-Louise tried to work on building relationships in her new tribe.: Reward challenge: The tribes must head out in pairs into a pool of mud. Each pair must collect as much mud as they can before they return to have the mud scraped off into buckets. The first tribe to fill their bucket wins a trip to a jungle spa with showers and toiletries, as well as champagne and cheese.; Saanapu won the challenge and thoroughly enjoyed their reward, while Vavau cleaned themselves up by swimming in the Pacific Ocean. At the spa, Jennah-Louise approached Kylie, the other Saanapu outsider, and she came with the idea of joining with El, Lee and Sam. At Vavau, Rohan tried very hard to find a way into the former Vavau members by informing Conner and Andrew about the plans to vote out Kat, but Andrew quickly told Kat what Rohan said, which increased Kat's desire to flip; Kat also informed Andrew that Rohan has the hidden immunity idol. That night, both tribes were left miserable as a massive storm swept across Samoa.: Immunity challenge: Three castaways from each team faced off against each other in the water to retrieve a ball and throw it into their team's net to score a point. The first team to score three points won immunity.; Despite Kate almost single-handedly scoring two goals for Vavau, Saanapu won the immunity challenge 3-2. After the challenge, Phoebe felt very vulnerable and tried to talk to Kate to find a way into the former Vavau members. Rohan also discussed with Sue and Conner and revealed that a hidden immunity idol is in contention and that he has intended for a long time to eliminate Kat. However, once again, Kat overheard the conversation, and said to Craig, Andrew and Sue that she would be happy to vote out Rohan. The former Vavau members discussed how to vote with the presence of an idol and wondered whether it would be better to split the vote between Phoebe and Rohan or just vote as a unit in the case that Kat doesn't flip and hope the idol isn't played. Phoebe felt very insecure and pleaded with Rohan to give her the idol; Phoebe then went to Kat and Kristie and asked them to vote for Sue. At Tribal Council, the Aganoa-Vavau divide in the tribe was made clear once again, but Andrew pitched the idea that former Aganoa members can save themselves by "getting on board". Phoebe quickly whispered to Kat and Rohan desperately trying to gain their votes against Sue, and Phoebe ended up playing Rohan's idol. Thus, the five votes cast against Phoebe by the former Vavau members were discounted, but it transpired that she was the lone former Aganoa member to follow the plan against Sue, with Rohan voting against Kat and Kat and Kristie voting against Rohan, sending him home in a 2-1-1-0 vote, and leaving Phoebe distraught and Kat delighted.
35	10	" I Have A Ferrari In My Brain"	Days 22-23	12 September 2016
At Vavau, Andrew worked on trying to make sure Conner didn't flip over the side of the Aganoa girls while Craig searched, again unsuccessfully, for the hidden immunity idol. Phoebe, meanwhile, was very forlorn about the loss of her closest ally, Rohan, and frustrated further by Kat's joy at his departure. Phoebe, feeling incredibly isolated, then went to search around the areas that she'd seen Craig go to find the hidden immunity idol, and very quickly managed to find it. At Saanapu, morale was incredibly high due to their winning streak and plethora of rewards.: Immunity challenge: Both tribes will, as a unit, move two logs through an A-frame, over a step-through and on monkey bars. Each tribe member will then use two rungs to get across the monkey bars and then complete a ladder. Once all the tribe members have got across the ladder, all the rungs will then be used to complete a puzzle.; Saanapu gained an early lead during the challenge which they sustained right through the end to extend their winning streak. Andrew, who was unconcerned about Vavau's continuing immunity losses, then decided that the former Vavau members would vote out Kat, but told Kat that they would vote off Phoebe. Kate and Craig, however, became concerned at the weakness in Vavau and thought about turning on Andrew due to his lack of performance in challenges and work around camp. Craig then implied to Phoebe and Kristie that they were thinking about removing Andrew which caused the Aganoa girls to think about whether he might be an option. Phoebe then also revealed to Kristie and Kat that she found the hidden immunity idol to ensure their loyalties. The three then tried to talk to Conner about voting out Andrew, but this conversation was very quickly interrupted by Andrew arriving. At Tribal Council, all the Vavau members stuck together and, with Phoebe's help, sent Kat home.
36	11	" The Chicken Debate"	Days 24-25	13 September 2016
Andrew was incensed at the two votes cast against him the previous Tribal Council and swore to eliminate Kristie as revenge. Kate then tried to reawaken the incredibly low morale at Vavau by waking her tribe early and instructing them in a yoga lesson. Andrew, however, was not interested in the yoga, which made Kate further annoyed at what she saw as an unmotivated and disrespectful attitude. At Saanapu, morale was also low because of their continuing bean diet and the tribe had a discussion about whether they should eat their chickens. Although the tribe was initially set on eating the chicken, Matt swayed the majority of the tribe to set them free, which infuriated Nick and made him see Matt as a threat.: Reward challenge: The tribes would be clipped together by a rope carrying 6 kilograms (13 lb) sand bags each. They would start on opposite sides of the course, racing through knee-deep water to catch the other tribe. If a tribe member drops out they must give their sandbag to someone from their tribe. The first tribe to tag a member from the other tribe would win a chocolate feast to enjoy at camp.; Saanapu won reward once again, with Sam carrying 24 kilograms (53 lb) and Lee carrying 18 kilograms (40 lb) managing to catch a Vavau team of five after Kristie fell. The tribe then, after failing to trade them, let their chickens go. At Vavau, while hunting sea cucumbers, Kristie and Phoebe tried to talk to Kate about the idea of voting Andrew out after his lack of motivation in challenges. The Aganoa girls were surprised at Kate's dislike of Andrew and remained hopeful that she would talk to the other former Vavau members at removing him.: Immunity challenge: One male and one female member from each tribe would hold on to a rope that would suspend a net. The castaways from the other tribe would attempt to toss coconuts into the net which would weigh it down. The castaway who held on to the rope the longest without letting the net touch the ground would win Immunity for their tribe.; Craig and Sue held the nets for Vavau while Sam and Flick held them for Saanapu. Vavau's poor coconut throwing, with Andrew failing to land a single coconut, put them back to Tribal Council despite the great efforts of Craig and Sue. Andrew wanted to vote out Kristie for voting for him in the last Tribal Council, but the idea of eliminating Andrew for his continually poor challenge performances was still brought forth. Phoebe and Kristie tried talking to Craig about voting Andrew off, and Kate also tried to bring Craig into the plan. Andrew became paranoid and tried to talk with Conner, Kristie and Phoebe about voting out Kate, before abandoning this plan and trying to ensure that the former Vavau members would stick together. However, Andrew's plans all fell apart as Kate and Craig joined with Phoebe and Kristie in voting him out.
37	12	" No Such Thing As A Sure Thing"	Days 26-27	18 September 2016
At Saanapu, the tribe had an argument about sleeping arrangements after Kylie decided to sleep in the bed as opposed to outside or next to the fire like she usually did and refused to move. This caused the rest of the tribe, especially Matt and Jennah-Louise, to become infuriated at her and even contemplate voting her off because of it. At Vavau, Conner was angry at Kate for detracting from their alliance to vote Andrew off and tried to ensure that the next target would be Phoebe. Kate gave an emotional reassurance to Conner that her move was not an attempt to save Phoebe and Kristie but purely an action against Andrew to strengthen their tribe, and apologised for not discussing it more with him. Craig continued searching for the hidden immunity idol, not knowing that Phoebe had already taken it. Phoebe then formed a bond with Conner and, though she wasn't able to break him from his alliance, gained his reassurance that in the case that she was being targeted by the former Vavau members, he would tell her. At Saanapu, the bond between Lee and Sam strengthened as the two went on a fishing trip. Brooke and Flick were also forming a tight bond with the two boys, which frustrated Matt as he felt he had lost his "angels".: Immunity challenge: One tribe member will launch coconuts from a catapult to another tribe member, who will then throw them over a defender to a third tribe member. This person will then race across a balance beam, avoiding sandbags been pushed by the opposing tribe, to place the coconut in a Connect Four-style grid. The first tribe to get five coconuts in a line on the grid will win immunity.; Effective teamwork, as well as good defending by Sam and running by Kylie, led Saanapu to a sixth consecutive challenge victory and a sending Vavau to their fourth Tribal Council in a row. This sent Vavau to a rock bottom morale, with Kate and Conner in particular feeling upset and responsible for the loss. Phoebe and Kristie immediately started talks about their strategy, with Phoebe predicting that Kate, Craig, Conner and Sue voting as a unit and planning on playing her idol for whomever they vote for. When Phoebe returned, Conner informed Phoebe that his alliance had already talked and, as per his promise, informed Phoebe that she would be voted for. The former Vavau members also revealed to Kristie that there was no chance of the vote being split as they intended for her to feel safe and connected with the tribe in the case of a merge, and that no one in Vavau thought that there was any chance of Phoebe possessing an idol. Phoebe and Kristie shared their respective information, and decided that Phoebe would have to play her idol. In terms of who they would target with their votes, the girls decided to vote together, and narrowed down their options to Craig, for his strategical prowess, Conner, for being a former Saanapu, or Sue, for her strong social game and loyalty. At Tribal Council, Vavau's losing streak and the bond the tribe shared was discussed, although Phoebe maintained that while the tribe was close, it was hypocritical to say that every member was valued when she was still at the bottom. Conner, Sue, Craig and Kate also said that while it was hard and disappointing, they did have a fair idea of who was going home. After the votes were cast, however, the former Vavau members were shocked when Phoebe played her idol, discounting the four votes cast against her, and sending a stunned Craig home.
38	13	" Disbelief And Relief"	Days 28-29	19 September 2016
At Vavau, Sue, Kate and Conner were stunned at Craig's elimination and questioned Phoebe over how she came to possess the hidden immunity idol. Kristie was then asked about whether she knew about the idol, to which she said that she "had an inkling" but hadn't actually seen it. Everyone was sceptical about Kristie's response and actions prior to Craig's departure and surprised at how effectively she was playing the game. Conner then said, after Andrew and Craig were gone, that Vavau should forget about the Vavau-Aganoa divide and just try to stay strong as a group. Phoebe, however, due to being targeted twice, privately refused to have any part with this and maintained she was only aligned with Kristie. Morale at Saanapu was at an all-time high, with Nick admitting as well that he was enjoying the destruction of Vavau. Saanapu also came to their beach to watch a rainbow. Meanwhile, Vavau's declaration of unity quickly fell apart when Sue talked with Kate about her dislike of Phoebe and her distrust of Kristie.: Reward challenge: Members of each tribe will compete one at a time in a memory test. A series of items will be shown in a particular order, and each competing tribe member will then race to their bench and recreate the series in the same order. The first person to get the sequence correct will score a point for their tribe, and the first tribe to reach five points will win a Samoan feast to enjoy back at camp.; Saanapu won reward yet again after winning the challenge by a score of 5-2 and thoroughly enjoyed their feast; though not long after, everyone felt very sick due to overeating. Vavau, however, became more drained and unhappy than ever. Kristie, desperate to improve the mood around camp after becoming upset at how depressed everyone was, prepared for her tribe a snail meal for everyone which went down surprisingly well. At Saanapu, Kylie came up with the idea of an all-female alliance alongside Flick, Brooke and Jennah-Louise and El. This idea made everyone else feel uncomfortable and Flick greatly disliked the idea of entering into an alliance with Kylie. At Vavau, Phoebe felt incredibly vulnerable having used both hidden immunity idols and knew that she needed to win the next immunity challenge as a way of saving herself. She also discussed that, had Rohan not been voted out so early, the tribe might be in a much better position. This led the tribe to discuss the idea of being genuine in the game, and Kristie stated that she found it impossible to lie. Her comments caused Sue to confront her about whether or not she knew that Phoebe had an idol prior to Craig's elimination, though Kristie maintained she never lied about it. Seeing Sue's anger at Kristie led Phoebe to the idea of turning on her closest ally as a way of extending her time in the game and tried to pit Sue, Kate and Conner against her.: Immunity challenge: From a pontoon, four tribe members will paddle a boat out as far as they can. Meanwhile, a member of the other tribe will race to open a gate and grab a rope to pull back the other tribe's boat until it's close enough to reach a bag of puzzle pieces. The tribe member will then race with these bags back to shore to complete the puzzle, with the first tribe to have their puzzle finished sending the other tribe to Tribal Council and receiving a special advantage.; Nick pulled back the boat and solved the puzzle for Saanapu, while Kate played the part for Vavau, and Saanapu claimed an eighth consecutive victory. The advantage was revealed by one member of Saanapu getting permission to oversee Vavau's Tribal Council. After the challenge, Kristie made the plan of trying to appear as non-threatening as possible so that it would seem that Phoebe was more dangerous, while Phoebe tried everything she could to influence everyone to vote Kristie. Phoebe then told Kristie that she had built an alliance with Conner to vote out Sue; Kristie had severe doubts about this plan but felt that she had no options. Tribal Council was overseen by Brooke, and ideas of how the game has shifted and how each tribe member was valued was discussed. The elimination of Craig was also mentioned, and Kristie maintained that she had no idea about Phoebe's immunity idol or that Craig was going to be blindsided. Sue, Conner and Kate stated that they did not believe Kristie, which caused Kristie to say that she had never lied in the game and that the whole experience had left her incredibly emotionally drained and she hated hearing that people thought she was telling lies. Jonathan then asked Kate, Conner and Sue whether they knew who they were going to vote for, to which they said that they would, but then announced that Vavau would not be voting, and instead Brooke would be selecting a player to take from Vavau to join Saanapu. Brooke said that she was intending on taking Phoebe, but now that she realised Phoebe's strategic prowess, she decided to take Sue. Sue said her goodbyes and left with Brooke to join the ten-member Saanapu, while the now four-member tribe of Phoebe, Kristie, Conner and Kate headed back to Vavau.
39	14	" Revenge, Redemption, And Justice"	Days 30-31	20 September 2016
Sue arrived at Saanapu and everyone was shocked to see her. Brooke selected Sue because she had no connection to Saanapu and seemed the least threatening. Nick planned on questioning her about why she decided to vote him out. At Vavau, Kristie had a feeling that she was being targeted by Conner, Kate and Sue and thus felt very relieved about the fact that there was no votes cast. Phoebe still reassured Kate and Conner that Kristie would remain the intended target and reaffirmed her power in the tribe. In the morning, Phoebe talked with Kristie about the current state of the tribe, during which the camp set on fire. At Saanapu, Nick took the opportunity to question Sue about why she voted him out. This sparked an argument in the middle of camp, and Sue felt very bad about the incident feeling that Nick was deliberately trying to give her a bad image in front of the whole tribe.: Reward/Immunity challenge: One at a time, each tribe member would spin around a post which would release a bag of puzzle pieces but also cause dizziness. The tribe member would then cross a rolling beam to a second post which would also require spinning to release a bag of puzzle pieces, before crossing a series of stepping posts to reach the mat and allow the next tribe member to begin. Once all eight bags are obtained, the tribe can then complete a puzzle to win immunity and reward, a breakfast spread from Hungry Jack's at the Togitogiga Falls.; Vavau took an early lead in the challenge, but this was closed up by Jennah-Louise and in the end Matt managed to finish the puzzle before Kate to extend Saanapu's winning streak to nine. Sue in particular enjoyed her first reward since Day 16 as the tribe swam amongst the waterfalls, but Nick still remained focused on removing her. Meanwhile, the four-member Vavau tribe discussed who to vote out. Kate and Conner symbolically reaffirmed their loyalty and trust to each other, being unable to see themselves progressing in the game without each other's support. They discussed whether to send their votes to either Phoebe or Kristie, who seemed ready to cannibalise each other. Phoebe talked with Kristie, despite intending to vote her off, and told her that she was trying to get Conner to vote against Kate, but also pressed her not to talk to either Conner or Kate. This made Kristie very uncomfortable, and she went to speak to Kate anyway. Kate revealed to Kristie that she was indeed the intended target at the previous Tribal Council, and that Phoebe was the person orchestrating the votes. After hearing the degree to which Phoebe had lied to and manipulated Kristie, and also that Phoebe had told Kristie to vote against Kate, Kate agreed to work with Kristie against Phoebe. Kristie also talked with Conner about Phoebe's tactics. Despite him previously giving his word to Phoebe that she would vote out Kristie, Conner considered voting out Phoebe. In the end, Conner and Kate determined Kristie to be the lesser of two evils and voted Phoebe out.
40	15	" Sunaapu Surveillance"	Days 32-33	25 September 2016
The lack of food at Vavau was really starting to affect the tribe and, with only three members, they were incredibly sceptical about winning any challenges. When the two tribes came together at their next event, however, they were announced to be merging. Everyone was delighted at this news, and immediately came together for the Survivor Auction.: Survivor Auction: Each of the castaways was given $500 to bid for items presented by Jonathan. Bidding was in $20 increments with no sharing of money or items permitted unless otherwise told.; Item 1 - Salt and vinegar chips and a bottle of soft drink (with 3 additional bottles of soft drinks to give to 3 people of the buyer's choice) - Conner ($60). His additional drinks going to Kate, Kristie and Sue.; Item 2 - Chocolate cake with a chocolate milk - Conner ($440).; Item 3 - Hidden item - Sam ($240). Sam was offered a second hidden item. He chose the first item which was nachos with a margarita.; Item 4 - Hidden item - Sue ($220). The item was revealed to be steak and chips.; Item 5 - A bath with hot water, bubble bath and a toothbrush to use for the remainder of the auction - Brooke ($20); Item 6 - An advantage - Lee ($80). The advantage was a vote stopper power.; Item 7 - Pasta and garlic bread with wine - Kate ($500).; Item 8 - Hidden item - Nick ($440). The item was revealed to be an advantage (a clue to the new hidden immunity idol).; Nick was very disappointed to find that his last item was an advantage, as he'd been voted out of Vavau because everyone thought he possessed an idol. With the auction finished, the newly merged Fia Fia tribe headed to their new location which was found to be the old Vavau camp. Conner felt incredibly vulnerable in the new tribe, as he felt that he could only trust Kate, Kristie and Sue and was aware that Brooke, Flick and Matt would all want him voted out and would find it easier finding numbers amongst their old Saanapu tribemates. Conner tried recruiting Kylie and Sam as a way of starting a potential majority to save himself. Lee read the advantage that he purchased at the auction, which turned out to be a power to stop someone from voting at a Tribal Council. Nick also read his advantage which turned out to be a clue to a hidden immunity idol. He immediately went to search for the idol, and found it under Lee's surveillance. After Sam found a pink skirt washed up on the beach, Brooke and El decided to make friendship bracelets. Brooke, Flick, El, Sam and Matt all wore one, which Conner saw as indicator of the strength of an alliance, but Kristie wore one as well which Conner took as potentially an indicator that she had flipped.: Immunity challenge: Castaways hung upside down on a horizontal pole using their arms and legs for as long as possible. The castaway who held on for the longest won individual immunity.; Brooke outlasted Kylie to win the challenge. Nick spoke with Brooke, Flick and Matt about the idea of splitting the vote, with the assumption that their alliance had nine people including Kylie, with five people voting for Conner and four for Kate. Sam and Lee, however, did not like the fact that Nick was making decisions around the camp and disliked the fact that their alliance was targeting Conner. Kylie informed Conner, Kate and Sue of the alliance's plan, stating that she refused to write Conner's name down, and Sue realised that if they were able to obtain six votes - for instance, Conner, Kate, Sue, Kristie, Sam and Kylie - then they would be able to foil the alliance's plan. Conner tried talking to Sam but was unable to do so without the observation of Brooke, who was deliberately following him around. Kate also tried talking to Kristie, who was trying to fit in with the majority with Lee and El but didn't like turning on Conner or Kate. At Tribal Council, the changing dynamics in the game since it became individual was discussed, although it was revealed that there was still a core alliance from the tribal section that there were controlling the game. At the voting, the alliance's strategy proved successful and was able to see Conner voted out.
41	16	" All Hell Has Broken Loose"	Days 34-35	26 September 2016
Kate was very forlorn about losing her closest ally and suspected she would be eliminated next unless she wins immunity. Nonetheless, while the tribe was bonding through renovating the shelter to make it suitable for a much larger tribe, Kate tried to find cracks in the majority alliance. She tried talking to Kylie about creating a "good guys" alliance to counter Brooke, Flick and El with Sam, Lee, Sue and Kristie. Meanwhile, the tight three of Flick, Brooke and El, who felt comfortably aligned with Sam and Lee talked through voting Kate off first before cutting off the others. Kate tried convincing Sam and Lee by drawing a triangle of hierarchy and tried to talk them into voting out Nick to remove the threat of the idol. Brooke, Flick and El created a Survivor-style beauty salon as a way of bonding the girls in the tribe, but afterwards Lee and Sam tried to talk with Kristie about voting out Nick, while Kate talked with Sue. Kristie then talked about her strategy of remaining a floater, by weaving through voting blocs rather than sticking with alliances. The girls then tried to talk to Nick, not letting him control the vote like he did last time, about voting Kate, and Nick said he was also trying to lay low and just become a number in the alliance.: Immunity challenge: Castaways spun a ball around a circular track using centripetal force, using momentum to keep the ball spinning. The castaway who kept the ball spinning for the longest wins individual immunity.; El won the challenge after outlasting Lee. Brooke planned to split the vote between Kate and Sue, but Sam didn't like the plan and tried to get a vote against Nick with Lee, Sue, Kristie and Kate. Sam then talked to Kylie, but she was incredibly reluctant to deviate from the plan and irritate Brooke, Flick and El. Kylie then informed Brooke about Sam's plan, hoping that she would be okay with the plan to keep Kate a little bit longer but still keep Brooke's confidence. Brooke and Flick, however, were very angry at Sam for going against the plan and confronted him about it. Kate also tried talking to Nick about whether she might be able to find the hidden immunity idol, but Nick refused to assist her. At Tribal Council, Kate made one more plea to those she talked with to not allow themselves to be manipulated by Brooke, Flick and El, but it came to no avail. Nick played his hidden immunity idol in the hope that it would show that he could be trusted, discounting the votes cast against him by Kate, Sam, Kristie and Sue, while Kate received six votes sending her home.
42	17	" A State Of Chaos And Confusion"	Days 36-37	27 September 2016
After Tribal Council, Brooke was glad that Kate was voted out but upset at the fact that Sam and many others were so intent on voting out Nick. Nick was distraught at the anger towards him and tried to open a conversation, but Sam refused to talk. Brooke later confronted Sam about the fact that he didn't talk to her about voting out Nick, but Sam showed no regrets of what he did or how he did it. Nick was very upset and felt isolated over the events of the previous Tribal Council as he felt that people were making personal attacks towards him. El talked to Nick and tried to cheer him up by suggesting that he attempt to make amends with Sam. Nonetheless, Nick felt ashamed for how his game has turned up as he felt it was causing him to be portrayed as a bad person in front of his family and his fiancee.: Reward challenge: The tribe will be divided into two teams of five. One by one, they will slide into the water, grab a ring, and manoeuver it along a rope through a series of obstacles to the shore. Once all five rings have been retrieved, the team will then toss them onto a series of pegs. The first team to land a ring on each of the five pegs will receive letters from home.; The teams were divided into the yellow team of Lee, Sam, Kylie, Nick and El, and the blue team of Brooke, Flick, Jennah-Louise, Matt and Sue. Kristie was not selected, but had the option of winning reward if she could accurately predict which team would win the challenge. Kristie chose to back the yellow team, and ended up being correct as Nick landed the final ring for his team. However, once the reward was over, Sam tried to negotiate with Jonathan about finding a way in which those who lost the challenge could still have their letters. Kristie offered to give up her letter for Matt while El gave up hers for Flick. The six then enjoyed their reward, and Matt, so thankful to Kristie, swore that he would never vote for her at Tribal Council. Nick then tried talking to Lee about the events the previous night, and Lee apologised for being so acid-tongued. Nick also spoke to Sam about the way he was playing the game, and Sam admitted that he was quick to judge Nick based on how he was perceived for his time back at Vavau, and apologised for making what were perceived as personal attacks on his life outside of the game. However, Sam was still uneasy at working with Nick in the game.: Immunity challenge: Each tribe member will hang on a pole fitted with narrow rope rungs for as long as they can, with the last player to drop winning immunity.; After nearly six hours, Kylie won immunity after Brooke agreed to step down in exchange for a letter from home. Brooke enjoyed her letter away from camp. Nick, knowing that he was being considered for elimination and afraid he was going to get votes again, tried to suggest voting strategies to his alliance. He talked with Matt and Kylie about voting off Sue, with a split vote involving Sam, Lee and Jennah-Lousie voting for Kristie and the other seven alliance members voting for Sue. The rest of the alliance plus Kristie, however, intended to vote out Nick. Sam suggested a split vote; Nick, Matt and Lee voting Sue and everyone else voting Nick. Brooke and Flick disliked the idea of removing Nick, believing that he is more trustworthy and easily controlled than Kylie and Jennah-Louise. They were also afraid of giving the former Vavau members more power. Brooke and Matt talked with Sam and Lee about the state of the vote, which was again appearing very messy and would perhaps lead to more people voting for Sue than intended. At Tribal Council, Sam again mentioned his desire for Nick to go and said that would have rather Nick eliminated at the previous vote than Kate. In frustration, Nick unwittingly revealed the alliance's structure and plan to remove the former Vavau members, in particular saying that Matt is not as safe as he would believe. This caused major frustration within the alliance, and in the end, Sam's wish came true as Nick was eliminated conclusively in an 8-3 vote and became the first member of the jury.
43	18	" Exiled"	Days 38-39	3 October 2016
Sam was very happy at Nick having left the game, but Matt was feeling uncomfortable after Nick revealed that he was not as tight to Brooke, Flick and El as he thought. The next morning, Jennah-Louise and Matt talked about what Nick said, and Matt was very forlorn about not being anyone's closest ally. Flick immediately tried convincing the five outsiders of Matt, Kylie, Sue, Jennah-Louise and Kristie that what Nick was saying was untrue, even though it was close to correct. Flick talked to Sue about gaining her trust, and although Sue agreed to support her, she secretly knew that Flick was playing her and had no intention of staying committed. Flick talked to Brooke about using Sue's vote to remove Matt just in case he flips, but Brooke still wanted to vote out Kylie .: Immunity challenge: The challenge is divided into three stages. The first involves all ten tribe members crossing a balance beam which they will finish constructing themselves. The first six will continue to the second stage, where they will have to cross a very unstable deconstructed bridge. The first three will move onto the final stage, which involves shooting balls into barrels using a pole. The first to land a ball in each three of their barrels will win immunity.; Jennah-Louise defeated Brooke and El in the final stage to win immunity, while those eliminated in the first stage - Matt, Sue, Lee and Flick - were sent immediately to Exile Beach. The four exiles were greeted by a sign saying that there was a hidden immunity idol hidden somewhere on the beach, but Flick convinced them all to not look for it. Flick then began strategising with Lee about voting out Matt as quickly as possible. At Fia Fia camp, the general discussions at camp were about voting Sue off. However, when it came to Tribal Council, only Kylie, Matt and Sam ended up voting Sue while the other seven voted Kylie out.
44	19	" All Guns Blazing"	Days 40-41	4 October 2016
After Tribal Council, El, Flick and Brooke discussed their strategy with nine players left and wondered how long they should wait before voting out Sam and Lee. Flick feared that Sue, Matt and Kristie could easily align with Lee and turn on them. Meanwhile, Jennah-Louise talked with Kristie and Sue about breaking up the girls' alliance; Sue agreed with this plan and tried getting Sam on board. Jennah-Louise then talked to Matt and revealed to him that the girls intended to oust him. Matt was very reluctant to make any move against Flick or Brooke and refused to align with Jennah-Louise, instead talking to Brooke about Jennah-Louise's scheming. El also uncovered this plan and relayed her information to Flick and Brooke. The girls decided that they needed to eliminate Jennah-Louise, or Matt in the case of Jennah-Louise finding a hidden immunity idol.: Reward challenge: The tribe will be divided into two teams of four. One team member will launch a ball from a slingshot, and the other team members will use lacrosse-style sticks to catch them. If a ball is caught, no matter what colour it is or who launched it, the player who caught it will earn a point for their team. The first team to reach five points will win a Sunday roast.; The teams were randomly chosen: the blue team consisted of El, Brooke, Lee and Sam while the yellow team was Kristie, Matt, Flick and Jennah-Louise. Sue drew a white rock and sat the challenge out, but chose to predict the blue team would win and would go on reward with them if they did. In the end, Lee single-handedly caught all five balls to win the challenge easily for the blue team 5-0. While the winning team enjoyed their reward, Jennah-Louise tried talking to Flick back at camp about whether she could truly trust Brooke and El given their closeness to Sam and Lee. The next morning, however, Jennah-Louise felt her plans to move against the girls' alliance had backfired as no one was really talking to her. She decided that if she was to have any chance of saving herself she would have to win immunity again.: Immunity challenge: Each tribe member would balance on their toes with a block wedged between their head and a frame above. The last person left standing with the block remaining in place would win immunity.; Jennah-Louise outlasted Matt to gain her crucial immunity win. Everyone except Sue were furious at the inability for Jennah-Louise to be eliminated, and Brooke and El discussed whether to instead vote out Sue, Kristie or Matt. In the end, Brooke decided it would be best to vote out Sue, but also split the vote with Kristie. Jennah-Louise and Sue were forlorn about the fact that all their attempts to break the alliance had failed, but both tried to use the vote splitting to their advantage by voting Kristie. At Tribal Council, Jennah-Louise immediately called out the alliance and the fact that Matt was at the bottom, but Matt rejected this. Sue also tried to call out the hierarchy, with Brooke, Flick, El and Lee at the top, but in the end, the alliance stuck together and the attempt to defect the vote to Kristie failed, as Sue was voted out in a 5-4 vote.
45	20	" The Game Is On Fire"	Days 42-43	9 October 2016
Matt apologised to Jennah-Louise for the heated discussion at the last Tribal Council, although he felt happy with the result. Kristie also felt, after nearly getting voted out, that now was her time to start being more active. In the morning, Lee talked to Kristie about how the votes were split at the last Tribal Council; Lee said he felt horrible about betraying Kristie by voting for her and that he would assist her in moving forward by campaigning against people such as Matt. Jennah-Louise and Kristie then started to talk about finding a way to break down the alliance, with Jennah-Louise believing that she would be a smart choice to take to the end. Paranoia spread through the tribe, and Sam and Brooke started to think about removing Lee and El as both physical and jury threats to instead reach the final four with Flick and Matt. To ensure that Lee and El couldn't make any action against the foursome, however, they were still decided on ensuring that Jennah-Louise and Kristie go first.: Immunity challenge: Each tribe member will run over a seesaw, balance beam and mud pit to reach a tower of blocks that they will need to transport back to the start. Once all nine blocks are collected, they will then run the course again to reach a sequence of images the competitors will have to memorise. Back at the start, they will then recreate the sequence using the blocks they collected. The first to correctly arrange the sequence at their station will win immunity.; Brooke won the incredibly close immunity challenge, leaving Jennah-Louise feeling incredibly vulnerable. She tried everything she could to find a way to stay longer in the game, including talking to Brooke and El about the possibility that Matt and Sam may try to move against them. This led to El and Lee discuss the possibility of moving against Brooke. At Tribal Council, Jennah-Louise was again vocal about her belief that people aren't playing hard enough for their own benefit. While the other players did voice their concerns about the way the game was shifting, Jennah-Louise, the last member of original Vavau, still ended up being voted out.
46	21	" This Is The Door Exploding"	Days 44-45	10 October 2016
The alliance was delighted to see the departure of Jennah-Louise, although the remarks she made about Flick being an outsider of her alliance had Flick seriously think about her position in the game. In the morning, Flick took a look at her five-person alliance with Brooke, Sam, Lee and El, and wondered if the time in which she would have to turn on her alliance was approaching; between El and Brooke, Flick regarded Brooke as the less genuine and more of a threat. Brooke also thought about turning her alliance, with her targets being Lee and El for being physical and jury threats.: Reward challenge: The seven tribe members would stand on a perch at the edge of a pontoon, holding a rope and leaning back over the water. Every ten minutes, the competitors would work their way back along the rope to a series of knots, each time decreasing the angle they would be above the water and making it harder to balance. The last person left holding onto the rope would win a chance to sleep the night in a comfortable bed.; Sam won reward, and chose to share the reward with the second-placer, Lee. Brooke was concerned about this choice, as she wondered if Sam was more loyal to Lee than her. This increased Brooke's desire to vote out Lee and El, an idea she immediately brought to Flick and Sam (despite the latter's close bond with Lee). Flick, however, relayed Brooke's strategy to El. El felt very hurt by this information, as she had thought that she and Brooke had a close bond, and Flick and El therefore made plans to blindside Brooke. That night, Lee and Sam enjoyed their night sleeping in a bed with Tim Tams, and Sam recognised how difficult it would be to vote out Lee considering the close friendship they had built and given that Sam was planning on playing a clean and honest game. However, both did recognise the intensity of the game and that it would ultimately involve working against close friends. The next morning, El informed Lee that Sam and Brooke were planning on voting against him. While not surprised at Brooke, Lee was disappointed at Sam as, although they had discussed the way game impacted on friendships, he still didn't expect Lee to betray him so quickly and easily and took it quite personally. With El, Lee and Flick all agreeing to vote out Brooke, Lee then talked to Kristie to make up their final number for their blindside. Kristie was very happy about the idea of blindsiding Brooke, but was worried about how trustworthy Flick is. Lee assured Kristie that Flick is much more loyal to El than she is to Brooke, and that Lee and El would ensure of Kristie's safety and progress in the game.: Immunity challenge: Each tribe member would hold onto a rope attached to a rotating platform. The competitors would then race back to a table with a collection of cards, which they would transfer onto the rotating platform to construct a house of cards. If the rope is not controlled properly, the platform would begin to spin and knock over the cards. The first to construct a house of cards that would reach higher than one metre would win immunity.; Lee led from the beginning and carried through to win the crucial immunity challenge. With Brooke and Sam's plan to oust him thwarted, they switched their intended target to be El. Matt was easily convinced to join their alliance, and although Brooke said she trusted Flick, Matt was concerned about Flick's loyalties. Sam talked to Flick about her choices and reassured her that her original Saanapu allies were solid. El also talked again to Flick to maintain her loyalties whilst under the guise of braiding her hair. Both were very concerned about Flick, as Flick's betrayal would cause the collapse of either plan. Flick, meanwhile, was torn up about which one of her close allies to betray. After Tribal Council, the slowly splintering alliances were discussed, and in the end, Flick chose to align with the original Aganoa members of Kristie, Lee and El to blindside her oldest friend Brooke.
47	22	" Don't Mess With Me"	Days 46-47	16 October 2016
Sam and Matt were shocked about the result of the last vote, while Lee, El and Flick came clean about the reason behind their votes. Sam, however, felt that his relationship with Lee had been crippled and feared he and Matt would be next to go. Flick talked to Matt about why he wasn't included in any of her decisions, saying that he had a reputation of being untrustworthy despite all his efforts of being loyal. Matt was still hurt by Flick's actions and he seriously disliked the thought of working with her. Flick, meanwhile, reaffirmed her bond with Lee and El and discussed voting Kristie out next. Kristie arrived just as they were discussing this plan, however, and she recognised that they may be planning against her and thus decided to keep the option of flipping against them with Matt and Sam open. Flick and El nearly caught Kristie discussing strategy with Matt, but Kristie was able to keep her true intentions hidden. Lee talked with Kristie, worried about whether the game was still getting the better of her, and showed that he did deeply respect her both as a player and a person. He also used this opportunity to ensure that Kristie would not align with Sam or Matt, or worry about the power of Flick within their alliance of four. Matt and Sam, meanwhile, talked with Flick about how she could reach the final two, and Matt brought forth the idea of an alliance against Lee and El (who would only help each other to reach the final two) with Matt, Sam and Kristie. Flick was sceptical about whether Kristie would work against Lee and El, but Matt remained confident that he could make her committed to the idea.: Reward challenge: Each tribe member would count the number of each of five different items in a box. Each number would correspond to a coordinate post further down the field. Once the numbers are memorised, the competitors would move to a second post which would give the order of each coordinate post. They would then use this information to use a rope to wrap around the coordinate posts, and then dig at the point where the rope intersects to retrieve a bag of puzzle pieces. The first person to solve their puzzle would spend the night at a luxury spa.; Matt very narrowly won the challenge after incredibly competent puzzle-solving. It was then revealed that another person would be joining him on the spa, but this would not be revealed until Tribal Council. Confused by this revelation, Flick, Lee and Kristie quickly talked about what their plan would be in the case of a surprise twist. The foursome wanted to split the vote between Sam and Matt, but in the intention that Sam would be eliminated first. Matt and Sam still worked on trying to get Flick and Kristie on their side, and told her that El and Lee had conspired to vote Flick off before the final four.: Reward challenge: Earlier, the tribe members took part in a survey with questions about their fellow tribemates. At Tribal Council, the questions would be asked again but this time the competitors would have to guess what the most popular answer was. If they guessed correctly, they would then have the opportunity to break one of their tribemates' squares on a five-by-six grid (each tribemate having a column of five squares). The last tribe member to have at least one unbroken square would join Matt on the luxury spa.; At the challenge, it was revealed that Sam was considered both the most-deserving and least-deserving to win the game, whilst Lee was considered the most popular player and Kristie the least popular. Sam also got the answers of being the person people would want to be sitting next to in the final two, and the most likely to blindside someone. In the end, Flick won the challenge over Matt, and the two agreed to allow Kristie to join them on the reward. Matt was incredibly happy to have the chance to talk with Flick and Kristie alone. Meanwhile, El, Lee and Sam were all sent to Exile Beach.
48	23	" The New Alliance"	Days 48-49	17 October 2016
Matt, Flick and Kristie awoke on their spa reward to a gourmet breakfast, and the three contemplated forming a new alliance together against Lee and El; Flick and Kristie meanwhile swore to stick together. Meanwhile, Sam, Lee and El were incredibly miserable trying to cope on Exile Beach, and not trying at all to talk strategy. When the six regrouped at the next challenge, Kristie, Matt and Flick were shocked to find that the other three had been to Exile Beach.: Reward challenge: The tribe will compete in two teams of three. The first team member will cut open coconuts and pour the water into a cup which the second member will run through an obstacle course to pour into the mouth of the third member, who will then make their make across a trampoline and release the water into a jar at the end. The first team to reach the black line in their jar will win a massive advantage at the next immunity challenge.; The spa trio of Kristie, Flick and Matt competed against the Exile Beach trio of Lee, El and Sam and, surprisingly, the tired and starving Exile Beach team ended up coming from behind to win due to their good teamwork. Meanwhile, Lee and El grew much closer to the point where they developed feelings for each other, but they tried to keep their affections separate from anything outside of the game, and instead just work on defeating Sam at the immunity challenge so they can get closer to the final two. Sam was shocked to hear from Matt that, at the reward challenge, he managed to form an alliance with Flick and Kristie. Meanwhile, Kristie had an emotional breakdown thinking about the game as she couldn't decide whether she should work with Lee and El or against them, and was wondering about whether she was compromising her morals. The whole tribe comforted her and all said that they were proud of her performance so far, but they also became worried about whether her emotions would make her unpredictable, and therefore Flick chose to inform Lee and El about Matt's strategising at the reward. Flick still intended to work with Matt to reach the end, but tried her hardest to keep Lee and El as close as possible.: Immunity challenge: All six tribe members would stand on a pyramid-shaped pontoon arrayed with footholds for as long as they could. As the challenge went on, they would have to move up the footholds making it more difficult to balance. The last competitor left standing on their pontoon would win immunity.; Lee, El and Sam, who won advantages for the challenge at the reward, began the challenge ten minutes later than Kristie, Flick and Matt. In the end, Lee outlasted El and Sam to win his second successive immunity, forcing Matt and Sam again to target El instead. Matt was confident of Flick and Kristie's trust, but Kristie and Flick discussed with Lee about voting off Sam in a split-vote between Sam and Matt. Kristie and Flick were undecided about who to align with, though Flick thought that it would be in her best interests to remain loyal to Matt and wanted to vote out El. Kristie, however, revealed this information to Lee, who tried to reassure her that she could go far if she remains loyal to him and El. Lee then told El about Flick's plan, and El confronted Flick about her motives and whether she and Kristie could be trusted. At Tribal Council, Matt and Sam and Lee and El continued to campaign for Flick and Kristie's votes, with Lee and El pleading loyalty and Sam and Matt saying that Lee and El would be impossible to defeat at the end. Ultimately, after Lee used his vote stopper power to block Sam from voting, Flick and Kristie decided to remain loyal to Lee and El and carry through the plan to split the vote between Sam and Matt to tie the vote between them. In the revote, Sam was eliminated unanimously.
49	24	" Two Seconds"	Days 50-51	23 October 2016
Awaking on Day 50, the five remaining tribemates came to realisation that they were very close to the end of the competition, and Matt vowed to win immunity to save himself at the next vote. Despite aligning closely with Matt prior to Sam's elimination, Flick felt that she had a much closer relationship with El, hence her decision to support her in the last vote. She decided that she really wanted to go to the end with El, but El implied that she was more heavily committed to Lee, which unnerved Flick. When the three were alone, Matt tried talking to Kristie and Flick about voting at least one of Lee and El out to give them a better chance at the Final Three challenge, while Flick sincerely apologised about betraying him and said that she did want to work with him. The three then decided to make the plan again of voting Lee off, though Kristie was still undecided.: Immunity challenge: Each tribe member will stand on a log while balancing a heavy ball on a wooden disc. At regular intervals, a second and third ball will be added. If at any point a competitor touches the ball, falls of the log, or lets the ball fall off the disc, then the competitor is out of the challenge. The last competitor remaining wins immunity.; Lee outlasted Matt to win immunity for the third consecutive time. Matt was very disappointed to lose the challenge, but tried his utmost to convince Kristie and Flick to vote against El. Flick and Kristie discussed the challenge prowess of Lee in particular, and Flick felt that it was in her best interest to vote El off. However, Flick's closeness to El meant that she and Kristie would owe her genuinity of telling her that she would be voted off. This backfired on Flick however, as El revealed that she had told her repeatedly that she would take her to the final two and had lied to her on many other occasions. El then made a plea to Kristie to work with her and Lee by reassuring her that they would be far more trustworthy than Flick. Kristie then asked Matt openly whether Flick had promised to take him to the final two, to which Matt said that she hadn't. Lee and El then talked to Kristie away from camp about what Flick had said, telling her that there was no guarantee that either of them would win the final immunity challenge, and even then no guarantee that they would take each other to the Final Tribal Council ahead of someone like Kristie. They also reiterated their promise of being truthful to Kristie and said that Flick and Matt were both liars, and then Lee also threatened to win every single challenge if El was voted out. While it was raining at camp, Matt and Lee then fought openly for Kristie's vote, and Lee and El confessed that they while they wanted to vote Flick out, their votes would be directed at Matt because he was a greater challenge threat. At Tribal Council, the events of the day and the impact of truthworthiness in the game were discussed, and in the end Kristie stayed loyal to El and Lee, and Matt ended up becoming the seventh member of the jury.
50	25	" Desperation Is A Stinky Cologne"	Days 52-53	24 October 2016
Flick was frustrated at Kristie for her unbreakable loyalty to El and Lee, and knew she would have to fight very hard to stay in the game. Kristie, however, still considered weighing up her options and didn't ruling out aligning with Flick. The next day, the four were ecstatic to find that they were given ingredients and supplies to make a small Samoan feast. Spying the firemaking equipment provided, Flick volunteered to learn how to make the fire so that she could practice in the event of a two-two tie and a firemaking challenge. Kristie noticed this and tried to remain prepared just in case Flick tries to deflect the vote onto her in the same way Phoebe did at Vavau. Kristie's fears were proven when Flick spoke to El to rekindle their friendship and put to her the idea that she deserves to stay more than Kristie. Lee and El then discussed whether it would make more sense about whether to keep Flick, who was perceived as weaker, than Kristie, who El thought would be more likely to take Lee to the Final Two. That night, a terrified and paranoid Kristie also practiced making fire, while Flick was determined to win the immunity challenge.: Immunity challenge: The immunity challenge was divided into sections: the first involved each tribe member being tethered to a rope which they would have to untangle by weaving under, over and through a series of obstacles. Once freed, they would then barrel-walk over the next section using rope as a guide. In the third, they would make a pole using sticks and twine to retrieve a key and open a gate to reach the final section which would be a puzzle. The first to complete the puzzle would win immunity and be guaranteed a place in the Final Three.; El won the challenge after Flick unknowingly knocked a piece of her puzzle off her board. Flick, knowing she was vulnerable, tried talking to Kristie about a nighttime conversation she heard between Lee and El about how they were definitely going to take each other to the Final Two. Kristie saw the merit in this, and doubted that she could beat Lee and El in a final immunity challenge, but still didn't trust Flick. Flick again talked to El about the history they have together in the game and tried to convince her to vote for Kristie instead of her to give her a chance of staying in the game through a fire-making challenge. Lee, however, didn't like the idea as he didn't trust Flick and felt that splitting the vote between Flick and Kristie would expose Lee if she and Kristie were to vote together against him. Flick tried to reason with him, and made more pleas for her to stay. At Tribal Council, she pleaded again to Kristie to vote with her against Lee, saying once more that she would never defeat Lee and El at the Final Immunity Challenge and that she would never get taken by either of them to the Final Two, but they were all to no avail as Kristie stuck with Lee and El and Flick was voted out. The jury were visibly exasperated at Kristie's gameplay and Flick called Kristie an idiot, but Kristie vowed to win the Final Immunity Challenge and make the Final Two.
51	26	" Take It All In"	Days 54-55	25 October 2016
Lee, El and Kristie immediately left camp in the morning to participate in the Traditional "Rites of Passage"; they walked past the torches of the twenty-one castaways who had left the game and honoured them before heading to their Final Immunity Challenge. The final three arrived at the site of the final challenge, a cliff top above the ocean. Jonathan surprised them with a visit from their loved ones (Kristie with her father, Lee with his sister and El with her sister), who would watch and give moral support to the castaways during the final challenge. Upon reuniting with her father, Kristie recalled watching the first season finale of American version of Survivor and an identical final challenge to the challenge she was about to partake in herself. She remembered telling her father that she wanted to be on and win Survivor.: Final Immunity Challenge: The final three castaways must balance themselves barefoot on pedestals while holding onto an idol with one hand. Any castaway who moves either foot off the post, lets go of the idol or touched the idol with their free hand will be eliminated from the challenge. The last castaway left standing wins the final immunity of the season and would have the sole vote at the night's Tribal Council.; El dropped after six hours, having to be carried away from the pole by Jonathan, with her wrist paralysed. After nearly six and a half hours, Krisite made an emotional plea to Lee begging him to let her win the challenge and promising that she would take him if she were to win. In the end, Lee slipped and Kristie, in tears and also unable to walk, was awarded the final immunity. At Tribal Council, the members of the Jury were all visibly shocked to see Kristie with the Immunity Necklace. Lee and El were both given the opportunity to campaign for Kristie to take them to the Final Two; El claimed that she had always tried to be genuine and support Kristie through the game and that she was less likely to get votes from the jury, while Lee said that he would be happy with whatever decision Kristie made. With her sole vote, Kristie kept her promise to Lee, voting El off to become the ninth and final member of the jury. Lee and Kristie awoke on Day 55 and celebrated with the traditional finalist breakfast. Kristie and Lee then thought about how they might approach their Final Tribal Council; Kristie intended to use the fact that she was constantly underestimated to her advantage, while Lee said he would try to say that he played as clean and honest a game as possible whilst also having a very good record in challenges. The two then left for their Final Tribal Council. In their opening statements to the jury, Lee and Kristie both reiterated what they believed were the strongest aspects of their gameplay: Lee said that he played for his sons and tried as hard as he could to play as honourably and loyally as possible, while Kristie delivered a very strong statement about how she was constantly underestimated and it was through her determination that she managed to fight through twenty Tribal Councils and two whole tribes (outlasting both the entire original Vavau and Saanapu tribes, with herself and Lee being the two remaining original Aganoa members) to get to the Final Two. The jury then asked questions to the Final Two; El was first, asking Lee what selfless acts he will perform if he wins, to which he answered that he will look after his mother and father, further his philanthropic work, and finance his sons' education. El then asked Kristie how she played the game, considering that she never appeared to approach anyone with any sort of strategy, and why she should vote for her. Kristie responded saying that she was unable to conduct any strong moves in the game, especially once she had entered Fia Fia, because she was alone whilst everyone else had very strong alliances. Flick was next, and asked Kristie why she refused to make big moves in the game, such as turn on Lee and El, even though it was in her best interests to do so. Kristie responded that those that made big moves ended up being voted out straight away afterwards, and her only making subtle moves was her strategy to remain in the game, especially considering the difficult position she was in upon the merge. Brooke then asked Lee if there was a romantic relationship between him and El or if the apparent attraction between them was just him leading her on to assist his strategy; Lee responded that he did not lead El on, and while they were very close it never got to the point of romantic attraction. Brooke next asked Kristie if all her strategic moves were controlled by Lee, to which she said that at no point did anyone have any control of her moves but she deliberately made it seem that they did to make people feel that they were secure. Jennah-Louise was next, and instantly remarked on Kristie's strong performance in the Final Tribal Council so far, before asking Lee why he chastised her for desiring the prize money and making her seem greedy when she intended to use the money to help her continue her humanitarian work. Lee apologised to Jennah-Louise, saying that it was a mistake he made in an emotional environment. Kylie came next, and gave a speech about her respect for the game and also the title of Sole Survivor, before asking both Kristie and Lee to own their game and justify her desire to see either of them granted the win. Next up was Sam, who confessed that Lee had a reputation of taking advantage of people who were vulnerable, and asked him how he might've taken advantage of Kristie. Lee said that he was just trying to make sure that she was okay given that she struggled early on in the game at Aganoa and it was through that where they began to talk strategy. Nick was next; he stated to Kristie that he was amazed at the boldness of her answers at the Final Tribal Council given that her statements at previous Tribal Councils had been "as incoherent as her gameplay", and explained to Lee that his tendency to take the moral highground and put so much value on morality given that he constantly was chastised those who were trying to play the game to save themselves and would end up backstabbing others occasionally for his own benefit. Lee responded by saying that he set himself up for failure, but he tried as hard as he could so that he could make his sons proud. Sue then came up and asked Kristie to explain her constant flip-flopping and erratic gameplay, to which Kristie said that it was necessary for her to stay in the game, especially on occasions, such as Sue's own elimination, where she was close to being voted out; she then also said that she was able to go to twenty Tribal Councils and predict the outcome of every single one. Last was Matt, who said that on occasions he saw two Kristies; one that was caring and supportive, and another that was manic; and asked her which Kristie he would possibly be voting for to win. Kristie responded by saying that the game caused severe emotional stress for her, including her having a mental breakdown very early into the game, to the point where she had incredible levels of anxiety. She explained this as the reason for the disconnect, but stated that she was able to continue in the game and fight through this despite all the adversity, and that was a great part of her growth throughout the game. The nine jury members then all voted for their winner, and just before the final vote count, Jonathan brought in the families of the two finalists to witness the vote count. In the end, Lee received one vote (from El), while Kristie received the remaining eight to win the $A500,000 and the title of Sole Survivor. In the episode's conclusion, the jury's votes for Kristie were shown, along with their voting booth confessionals giving their comments: Matt stated he wasn't sure how Kristie managed to persevere, but thought it was "inspiring" and "incredible"; Flick stated that Kristie deserved to be the Sole Survivor; Sue commented "well deserved, good on you...but you're still a naughty little girl"; Brooke confessed that while she had never expected Kristie to even make it to end, let alone get her vote, Kristie won her over with her Final Tribal Council performance; Jennah-Louise commended Kristie for beating the odds, getting to the end, and living her dream; Sam simply held up his vote for Kristie and plainly stated "this game definitely has a sick sense of humor"; Kylie proclaimed that she believed that Kristie "owned" her game; Finally, Nick was uncharacteristically silent as he cast his vote for Kristie, but after placing it in the urn he whispered to himself "Wow...I can't believe I just did that," and walked away from the podium.

== Voting history ==
Tribal phase (Day 1–31)

	Original Tribes				Tribe Swap Vote (Note: On Day 12, a double Tribal Council was held where both tribes unknowingly voted for a castaway to be swapped to the other tribe.)				Swapped Tribes			Dissolved Tribes				Kidnap (Note: On Day 29, instead of Vavau voting out a castaway, Brooke - as representative for Saanapu tribe - chose a Vavau member to kidnap — bringing them over to Saanapu. Sue was 'kidnapped' by Brooke and become part of Saanapu.)	Post-Kidnap
Episode #	1	2	3	4	5				6	7		9	10	11	12	13	14
Day #	2	5	8	10	12				14	17		21	23	25	27	29	31
Eliminated	Des	Bianca	Evan	Peter	Nick (Note: Instead of being eliminated from the game, Nick and Conner switched tribes, and each were instructed to bring another tribemate with them. Nick and Tegan were switched to Saanapu, while Conner and Sam were switched to Vavau.)	Tie (Note: The first Tribal Council vote resulted in a tie. Per the rules, a second vote was held where the castaways involved in the tie would not vote and the remaining castaways could only vote for those who tied.)	Tie (Note: After two rounds of voting, Tribal Council remained tied. Per the rules, the non-tied castaways were to come to a consensus as to who to vote out of the tribe between the tied castaways, Conner and Flick, or else one of the deliberating castaways would be voted out of the tribe by random draw; they chose to vote Conner out of the tribe.)	Conner	Barry	Tie	Tegan	Rohan	Kat	Andrew	Craig	Sue	Phoebe
Vote	7–1	5–2–1	5–2	Quit (Note: No vote; Peter chose to quit the game. This cancelled Aganoa's planned vote-off.)	5–3	3–3	2–2	Consensus	7–1	2–2–0 (Note: Kylie played a hidden immunity idol, therefore two votes against her were negated.)	4–0	2–1–1–0 (Note: Phoebe played a hidden immunity idol, therefore five votes against her were negated.)	6–2	4–3	2–0 (Note: Phoebe played a hidden immunity idol, therefore four votes against her were negated.)	1–0	3–1
Voter	Vote																
Kristie	Des		Evan									Rohan	Andrew	Andrew	Craig		Phoebe
Lee	Des		Kat														
El	Des		Evan														
Flick		Bianca				Conner	None (Note: Conner and Flick were not eligible to vote in the second Tribal Council vote.)			Nick	Tegan						
Matt		Bianca				Conner	Flick			Tegan	Tegan						
Sam		Bianca				Flick	Conner		Barry								
Brooke		Bianca				Conner	Conner			Nick	Tegan					Sue	
Jennah-Louise					Nick				Barry								
Sue					Nick				Barry			~~Phoebe~~	Kat	Kristie	~~Phoebe~~	Kidnap	
Kylie		Peter				Flick	Flick			Tegan	Tegan						
Nick					Barry					~~Kylie~~	None (Note: Nick and Tegan were not eligible to vote in the second Tribal Council vote.)						
Kate					Barry				Barry			~~Phoebe~~	Kat	Andrew	~~Phoebe~~		Phoebe
Conner		Bianca				Flick	None		Barry			~~Phoebe~~	Kat	Kristie	~~Phoebe~~		Phoebe
Phoebe	Des		Evan									Sue	Kat	Andrew	Craig		Kristie
Craig					Nick				Barry			~~Phoebe~~	Kat	Andrew	~~Phoebe~~		
Andrew					Nick				Barry			~~Phoebe~~	Kat	Kristie			
Kat	Des		Evan									Rohan	Andrew				
Rohan	Des		Evan									Kat					
Tegan					Barry					~~Kylie~~	None						
Barry					Nick				Sue								
Peter		Kylie															
Evan	Des		Kat														
Bianca		Peter															
Des	Kat																

Individual phase (Day 32–55)

	Merged Tribe											
Episode #	15	16	17	18	19	20	21	23		24	25	26
Day #	33	35	37	39	41	43	45	49		51	53	54
Eliminated	Conner	Kate	Nick	Kylie	Sue	Jennah-Louise	Brooke	Tie	Sam	Matt	Flick	El
Vote	6–4–1–1–1	6–2–0 (Note: Nick played a hidden immunity idol, therefore four votes against him were negated.)	8–3	7–3	5–4	5–3	4–3	2–2–1	4–0	3–1–1	3–1	1–0
Voter	Vote											
Kristie	Conner	~~Nick~~	Nick	Kylie	Sue	Jennah-Louise	Brooke	Matt	Sam	Matt	Flick	El
Lee	Conner	Kate	Sue	Kylie	Kristie	Jennah-Louise	Brooke	Sam	Sam	Matt	Flick	None (Note: El and Lee were not eligible to vote as the only eligible players they could vote for were each other and hence their votes would cancel each other's out.)
El	Conner	Kate	Nick	Kylie	Sue	Kristie	Brooke	Matt	Sam	Flick	Flick	None
Flick	Conner	Kate	Nick	Kylie	Sue	Jennah-Louise	Brooke	Sam	Sam	Matt	Lee	
Matt	Kate	Sue	Sue	Sue	Sue	Jennah-Louise	El	El	None (Note: Matt was not eligible to vote in the second Tribal Council vote, while Sam was already not eligible to vote as a result of the Vote Block Power.)	El		
Sam	Conner	~~Nick~~	Nick	Sue	Kristie	Kristie	El	None (Note: Sam was not eligible to vote at Tribal Council vote, as Lee used his vote block power on him.)				
Brooke	Kate	Kate	Nick	Kylie	Sue	Jennah-Louise	El					
Jennah-Louise	Kate	Kate	Nick	Kylie	Kristie	Kristie						
Sue	Matt	~~Nick~~	Nick	Kylie	Kristie							
Kylie	Kate	Kate	Nick	Sue								
Nick	Conner	Sue	Sue									
Kate	Kylie	~~Nick~~										
Conner	Nick											

Final vote
Episode #	26	
Day #	55	
Finalist	Kristie	Lee
Vote	8–1	
Juror	Vote	
El		Lee
Flick	Kristie	
Matt	Kristie	
Sam	Kristie	
Brooke	Kristie	
Jennah-Louise	Kristie	
Sue	Kristie	
Kylie	Kristie	
Nick	Kristie	

== Reception ==
=== Ratings ===
Ratings data is from OzTAM and represents the viewership from the 5 largest Australian metropolitan centres (Sydney, Melbourne, Brisbane, Perth and Adelaide).

Australian Survivor Season 3 ratings, with overnight ratings and timeshift viewers.
Week	Episode	Air date	Timeslot	Overnight ratings		Timeshift ratings			Source
Week	Episode	Air date	Timeslot	Viewers	Rank	Timeshift Viewers	Total Viewers	Rank	Source
1	1 (Note: The first episode was coded into two programs - the first titled "Launch" and the second titled "Tribal Council". Because of this, two separate sets of ratings were produced.)	21 August 2016	Sunday 7:30pm	783,000	6	74,000	857,000	5	
1	1	21 August 2016	Sunday 7:30pm	784,000	5	62,000	848,000	6	
1	2	22 August 2016	Monday 7:30pm	734,000	14	90,000	823,000	12	
2	3	28 August 2016	Sunday 7:30pm	662,000	9	84,000	746,000	9	
2	4	29 August 2016	Monday 7:30pm	677,000	18	92,000	769,000	16	
2	5	30 August 2016	Tuesday 7:30pm	728,000	12	122,000	850,000	11	
3	6	4 September 2016	Sunday 7:30pm	560,000	10	61,000	625,000	10	
3	7	5 September 2016	Monday 7:30pm	662,000	17	66,000	728,000	14	
3	8	6 September 2016	Tuesday 7:30pm	717,000	13	99,000	818,000	12	
4	9	11 September 2016	Sunday 7:30pm	586,000	10	74,000	660,000	10	
4	10	12 September 2016	Monday 7:30pm	672,000	15	74,000	746,000	13	
4	11	13 September 2016	Tuesday 7:30pm	690,000	10	92,000	782,000	10	
5	12	18 September 2016	Sunday 7:30pm	649,000	9	71,000	720,000	8	
5	13	19 September 2016	Monday 7:30pm	699,000	11	82,000	781,000	8	
5	14	20 September 2016	Tuesday 7:30pm	699,000	10	98,000	797,000	10	
6	15	25 September 2016	Sunday 7:30pm	568,000	8	61,000	629,000	8	
6	16	26 September 2016	Monday 7:30pm	654,000	12	72,000	726,000	10	
6	17	27 September 2016	Tuesday 7:30pm	691,000	13	113,000	804,000	10	
7	18	3 October 2016	Monday 7:30pm	684,000	16	62,000	744,000	14	
7	19	4 October 2016	Tuesday 7:30pm	660,000	13	69,000	729,000	12	
8	20	9 October 2016	Sunday 7:30pm	708,000	13	72,000	770,000	11	
8	21	10 October 2016	Monday 7:30pm	760,000	12	79,000	839,000	10	
9	22	16 October 2016	Sunday 7:30pm	660,000	8	84,000	744,000	7	
9	23	17 October 2016	Monday 7:30pm	760,000	11	75,000	835,000	9	
10	24	23 October 2016	Sunday 7:30pm	714,000	7	45,000	759,000	7	
10	25	24 October 2016	Monday 7:30pm	750,000	11	32,000	782,000	11	
10	26 (Note: The final episode was coded into two programs - the first titled "Grand Finale" and the second titled "Winner Announced". Because of this, two separate sets of ratings were produced.)	25 October 2016	Tuesday 7:30pm	859,000	7	55,000	914,000	7	
10	26	25 October 2016	Tuesday 7:30pm	1,082,000	2	90,000	1,172,000	1	
