= Barry Lea =

Australia international rugby union & league player (born 1972)

Personal information
- Full name: Barry Phillip John Lea
- Born: 24 March 1972 (age 54) Brisbane, QLD, Australia
- Height: 5 ft 11 in (180 cm)
- Weight: 182 lb (83 kg)

Playing information
Club
| Years | Team | Pld | T | G | FG | P |
|---|---|---|---|---|---|---|
| 1990 | Newcastle Knights |
| 1997 | Canberra Raiders | 1 | | | | 0 |
| | Total | 1 | 0 | 0 | 0 | 0 |

Rugby union career
- Position: Wing
Super Rugby
| Years | Team | Apps | (Points) |
| 1997 | Reds | 2 | (0) |
International career
| Years | Team | Apps | (Points) |
| 1993 | Australia | | |

Barry Phillip John Lea (born 24 March 1972) is an Australian former professional rugby player.

Born in Brisbane, Lea is the son of indigenous Vietnam War veteran Corporal Buddy Lea, who was portrayed by Lasarus Ratuere in the 2019 film Danger Close: The Battle of Long Tan.

Lea took up a scholarship to The Southport School, where he played both 1st XV rugby and 1st XI cricket. He played his rugby as a winger and was the top try-scorer at the 1989 Australian Schools National Championship playing for Queensland Schools, subsequently earning selection on that year's Australian schoolboys side.

In 1990, Lea was drafted by rugby league team Newcastle Knights. He competed with Newcastle at the Nissan Sevens tournament during the 1991 pre-season, before returning to Queensland.

Lea played for Souths in Brisbane rugby union, quickly earning Queensland County and Australian U-21s selection. After representing Australia in rugby sevens in 1993, Lea won a Wallabies call up for the 1993 end of year tour, despite not having yet represented Queensland. He scored a try in an uncapped match against the United States in Riverside, California and in the final tour match against the Barbarians in France. The following year, Lea made his first Queensland team, for a tour of Argentina. The 1994 representative season saw Lea scoring 11 tries including the first of the super 10 final in Durban as Queensland went on to win the game and the title of super 10 champions. He competed briefly with the Reds early in the 1997 Super 12 season, then crossed codes to play in the Super League with the Canberra Raiders, before finishing his career with a stint at English rugby union club Saracens.

Post rugby, Lea has worked as a radio host and acted in an episode of the ABC television series The Straits, starring Brian Cox. He played an off-duty policeman in the comedy Paperback Hero. He was a contestant on the third season of Australian Survivor, where he was voted out on day 14.
