= Lee Carseldine =

Australian cricketer

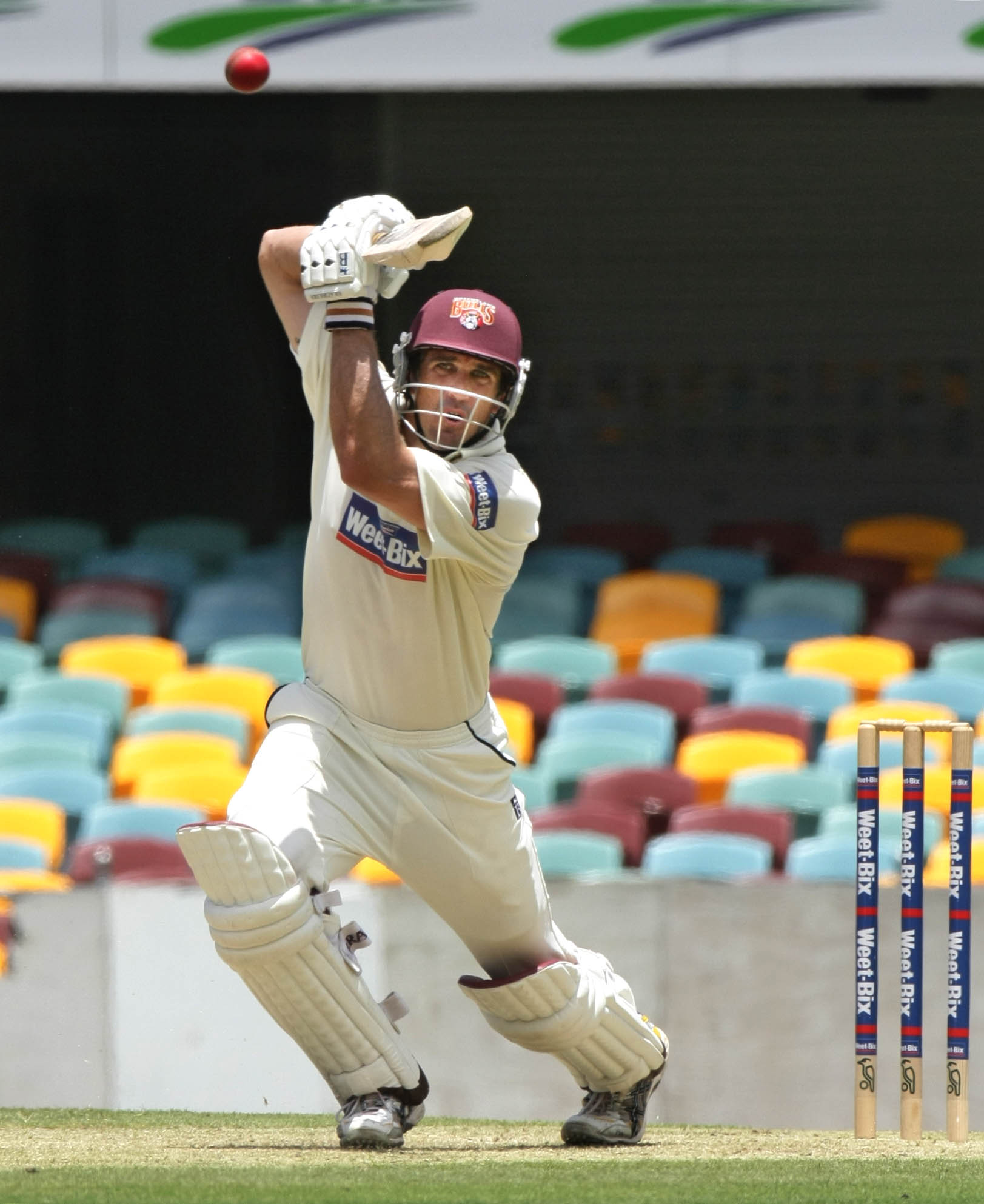

Personal information
- Full name: Lee Andrew Carseldine
- Born: 17 November 1975 (age 51); Nambour, Queensland
- Batting: Left-handed
- Bowling: Left-arm medium
- Role: Allrounder

Domestic team information
- Years: Team
- 1998/99–2010/11: Queensland
- 2009: Rajasthan Royals

Career statistics
Competition	FC	LA	T20
Matches	47	59	26
Runs scored	2,298	1,529	596
Batting average	34.29	28.31	31.36
100s/50s	3/13	3/7	0/4
Top score	152	126	74
Balls bowled	1,377	378	84
Wickets	14	11	7
Bowling average	47.57	27.00	16.14
5 wickets in innings	0	0	0
10 wickets in match	0	0	0
Best bowling	3/25	4/6	2/13
Catches/stumpings	51/–	21/–	9/–
- Source: ESPNcricinfo, 16 May 2016

Lee Andrew Carseldine (born 17 November 1975) is a retired professional Australian cricketer, entrepreneur and media personality.

== Education ==
Carseldine has a Masters in Applied Finance and a Masters of Business Administration (MBA) from the Queensland University of Technology.

== Sporting career ==
Carseldine played 132 matches for the Queensland Bulls in all formats, with 2298 runs from 47 first-class games and 1529 runs from 59 one-day games.

Carseldine's back stress fractures and degenerative disc problems forced him into retirement in 2004 after 24 first class games. He made a comeback in November 2007, playing for the Bulls in Sheffield Shield, FR Cup, and Twenty20 matches. He also earned a spot in the Rajasthan Royals Indian Premier League side.

Carseldine retired from first class cricket in 2011 and continued to freelance himself in the T20 format which saw him play in the Bangladesh Premier League and KFC Big Bash until 2012. Upon retirement he joined the Australian Cricketers Association as a Past Player Welfare and Game Development Manager.

== Media career ==
Carseldine regularly contributed to ABC Grandstand and Fox Sports as a sports commentator, whilst employed by the Australian Cricketers' Association.

Throughout his career, Carseldine has co-hosted Channel 7's Creek to Coast, Weekender, QBD Book Club, and the returning The Great Outdoors. He has also hosted the Logie Award-nominated kid's TV series Crash The Bash.

In June 2014 Carseldine joined Sunshine Coast radio station Hot 91 as a presenter of The Big Brekky, alongside Daniel O'Carroll, Lynda Edmonds and Ash Gierke. However, Carseldine resigned just six weeks after joining Hot 91, citing personal reasons. Hot 91 station manager Troy Deighton wished Carseldine well, saying he understood and respected his decision to leave the station.

In 2016, he appeared as a contestant on season 3 of Australian Survivor. He ended up as the season's runner-up.

Carseldine appeared on the January 2017 issue of Australian Men's Health magazine.

In 2020, he returned to play on Australian Survivor: All Stars. He made it deep into the season again, only to voluntarily leave the game upon news of his mother's stroke.

== Business Ventures ==
In 2015, Carseldine founded Droneit Group, a pioneering company specializing in aerial imagery, drone services, and drone training programs. The business grew to become a leader in drone training in Australia, offering comprehensive programs catering to commercial and recreational drone operators. Carseldine's entrepreneurial vision transformed Droneit Group into a highly regarded name in the drone industry.

In 2022, Carseldine established Norgay Media Pty Ltd, a media production company offering photography, aerial and editing services.

== Charity Work ==
Following the passing of his mother, Elizabeth, from a stroke in 2019, Carseldine became an active advocate for stroke awareness and prevention. In 2020, he co-launched the "Towel Challenge" with fellow Australian Survivor contestant David Genat, aiming to raise funds and awareness for the Stroke Foundation. The campaign encouraged participants to post photos wearing towels and successfully raised significant funds for stroke research.

In 2022, Carseldine undertook a 140-kilometer walk across K'gari Fraser Island, carrying a 19-kilogram backpack to symbolize the frequency of strokes occurring every 19 minutes in Australia. This endeavor was part of the Stroke Foundation's "Stride4Stroke" campaign, emphasizing the importance of physical activity in stroke prevention.

In 2023, during International Men's Health Week, Carseldine supported the Stroke Foundation's "Bloke Beside You" campaign, which aimed to improve men's awareness of stroke signs and symptoms. His advocacy efforts have been instrumental in educating the public about stroke prevention and the critical nature of timely medical intervention.

== Personal life ==
Carseldine has two sons with his ex-wife, Tanya. He and fellow Australian Survivor contestant Elena Rowland began a relationship when their series ended. In February 2019, the couple broke up.
