= Beach volleyball at the 2013 Pacific Mini Games =

Beach volleyball, for the 2013 Pacific Mini Games, was held at Kolopelu's Place on Futuna. The competition schedule for this sport went from 5 to 10 September 2013.

== Medal table ==
Rank	Nation	Gold	Silver	Bronze	Total
1	French Polynesia (TAH)	1	0	0	1
1	Vanuatu (VAN)	1	0	0	1
3	Papua New Guinea (PNG)	0	1	1	2
4	Samoa (SAM)	0	1	0	1
5	Solomon Islands (SOL)	0	0	1	1
Totals (5 entries)		2	2	2	6

== Results ==
=== Men ===
==== Round Robin ====
===== Pool A =====
Pos	Team	Pld	W	L	Pts	SW	SL	SR	SPW	SPL	SPR
1	–	0	0	0	0	0	0	—	0	0	—
2	–	0	0	0	0	0	0	—	0	0	—
3	–	0	0	0	0	0	0	—	0	0	—
4	–	0	0	0	0	0	0	—	0	0	—

===== Pool B =====
Pos	Team	Pld	W	L	Pts	SW	SL	SR	SPW	SPL	SPR
1	–	0	0	0	0	0	0	—	0	0	—
2	–	0	0	0	0	0	0	—	0	0	—
3	–	0	0	0	0	0	0	—	0	0	—
4	–	0	0	0	0	0	0	—	0	0	—

===== Pool C =====
Pos	Team	Pld	W	L	Pts	SW	SL	SR	SPW	SPL	SPR
1	–	0	0	0	0	0	0	—	0	0	—
2	–	0	0	0	0	0	0	—	0	0	—
3	–	0	0	0	0	0	0	—	0	0	—
4	–	0	0	0	0	0	0	—	0	0	—

=== Women ===
==== Round Robin ====
===== Pool A =====
Pos	Team	Pld	W	L	Pts	SW	SL	SR	SPW	SPL	SPR
1	–	0	0	0	0	0	0	—	0	0	—
2	–	0	0	0	0	0	0	—	0	0	—
3	–	0	0	0	0	0	0	—	0	0	—
4	–	0	0	0	0	0	0	—	0	0	—

===== Pool B =====
Pos	Team	Pld	W	L	Pts	SW	SL	SR	SPW	SPL	SPR
1	–	0	0	0	0	0	0	—	0	0	—
2	–	0	0	0	0	0	0	—	0	0	—
3	–	0	0	0	0	0	0	—	0	0	—
4	–	0	0	0	0	0	0	—	0	0	—

===== Pool C =====
Pos	Team	Pld	W	L	Pts	SW	SL	SR	SPW	SPL	SPR
1	–	0	0	0	0	0	0	—	0	0	—
2	–	0	0	0	0	0	0	—	0	0	—
3	–	0	0	0	0	0	0	—	0	0	—
4	–	0	0	0	0	0	0	—	0	0	—
