= Taekwondo at the 2013 Pacific Mini Games =

Taekwondo competition

Taekwondo, for the 2013 Pacific Mini Games, took place at Kafika Hall, in Mata-Utu. The events, for this sport, took place on the 9 and 10 September 2013.

== Medal table ==
Key:

* Host nation (Wallis and Futuna)

Rank	Nation	Gold	Silver	Bronze	Total
1	French Polynesia (TAH)	11	3	1	15
2	Papua New Guinea (PNG)	1	7	7	15
3	Wallis and Futuna (WLF)*	1	4	4	9
4	Vanuatu (VAN)	1	0	5	6
5	Marshall Islands (MHL)	1	0	0	1
6	New Caledonia (NCL)	0	1	0	1
7	Fiji (FIJ)	0	0	3	3
7	Solomon Islands (SOL)	0	0	3	3
9	Guam (GUM)	0	0	2	2
9	Tonga (TON)	0	0	2	2
11	Samoa (SAM)	0	0	1	1
Totals (11 entries)		15	15	28	58

== Medal summary ==
There were fifteen medal events contested, nine for men and sixteen for women.

=== Men's events ===
Event	Gold	Silver	Bronze
Finweight (54 kg)	Hiroitepumanatu Tixier; Tahiti	Maxemillion Kassman; Papua New Guinea	Ian Tasso; Vanuatu
Flyweight (58 kg)	Manu Huaatua; Tahiti	Isabio Detroch; Papua New Guinea	Joseph Ho; Guam
Flyweight (58 kg)	Manu Huaatua; Tahiti	Isabio Detroch; Papua New Guinea	Christophe Sionepoe; Wallis and Futuna
Featherweight (63 kg)	Sam Jason; Marshall Islands	Pinnie Rainner; Papua New Guinea	Alik Delly; Solomon Islands
Featherweight (63 kg)	Sam Jason; Marshall Islands	Pinnie Rainner; Papua New Guinea	Ali Semer; Fiji
Lightweight (68 kg)	Bruce Johnatan; Vanuatu	Jacques Tinirau; Tahiti	Willy Tuihihifo Vegi; Wallis and Futuna
Lightweight (68 kg)	Bruce Johnatan; Vanuatu	Jacques Tinirau; Tahiti	Marceline Nima; Papua New Guinea
Welterweight (74 kg)	Peter Babka; Tahiti	Gordon Kama; Papua New Guinea	Alexander Allen; Guam
Middleweight (80 kg)	Jurgen Vegi; Wallis and Futuna	Waldeck Defaix; Tahiti	Pongi Maake; Tonga
Middleweight (80 kg)	Jurgen Vegi; Wallis and Futuna	Waldeck Defaix; Tahiti	Karutake Tonga; Fiji
Heavyweight 1 (87 kg)	Tuarai Hery; Tahiti	Luka Filioleata; Wallis and Futuna	Finau; Tonga
Heavyweight 1 (87 kg)	Tuarai Hery; Tahiti	Luka Filioleata; Wallis and Futuna	Herve Liquslili; Vanuatu
Heavyweight 2 (+87 kg)	Haamanatua Mu; Tahiti	Patita Vegi; Wallis and Futuna	Chatterton Roberts; Papua New Guinea
Heavyweight 2 (+87 kg)	Haamanatua Mu; Tahiti	Patita Vegi; Wallis and Futuna	Clydesade Rika; Solomon Islands
Team	Tahiti	Papua New Guinea	Wallis and Futuna
Team	Tahiti	Papua New Guinea	Vanuatu

=== Women's events ===
Event	Gold	Silver	Bronze
Flyweight (49 kg)	Jasmine Atnaud; Tahiti	Grace Taleo; Papua New Guinea	Ieanne Danf; Fiji
Flyweight (49 kg)	Jasmine Atnaud; Tahiti	Grace Taleo; Papua New Guinea	Freda Stafford; Papua New Guinea
Bantamweight (53 kg)	Theresa Tona; Papua New Guinea	Lindsay Gavin; New Caledonia	Augustine Simona; Vanuatu
Bantamweight (53 kg)	Theresa Tona; Papua New Guinea	Lindsay Gavin; New Caledonia	Laure Largeron; Tahiti
Lightweight (62 kg)	Humblin Urarimarotini; Tahiti	Raihauti Mataheitini; Tahiti	Stephanie Kombo; Papua New Guinea
Lightweight (62 kg)	Humblin Urarimarotini; Tahiti	Raihauti Mataheitini; Tahiti	Clement Anne; Papua New Guinea
Welterweight (67 kg)	Mehiana Tufariua; Tahiti	Francillia Kokin; Papua New Guinea	Ioli Lutrishia; Vanuatu
Welterweight (67 kg)	Mehiana Tufariua; Tahiti	Francillia Kokin; Papua New Guinea	Fania Taalo; Wallis and Futuna
Heavyweight (+73 kg)	Moehau Faaite; Tahiti	Jennifer Vegi; Wallis and Futuna	Mala Geraldine; Papua New Guinea
Heavyweight (+73 kg)	Moehau Faaite; Tahiti	Jennifer Vegi; Wallis and Futuna	Mika Telesia; Samoa
Team	Tahiti	Wallis and Futuna	Solomon Islands
Team	Tahiti	Wallis and Futuna	Papua New Guinea
