= Taekwondo at the 2007 South Pacific Games =

Taekwondo competition

Taekwondo at the 2007 South Pacific Games in Apia, Samoa was held on 30 August to 1 September 2007. The taekwondo tournament was dominated by Francophone nations winning eleven of the thirteen events. Tahiti, New Caledonia, and Wallis and Futuna won six, four, and one gold medals respectively.

== Medal overview ==
=== Men ===
Event	Gold	Silver	Bronze
Finweight (– 54 kg)	(French Polynesia) Theddy Teng	(Tonga) Sioasi Vaetupu	(New Caledonia) Julien Desgripes
Flyweight (– 58 kg)	(New Caledonia) Arnold Sariman	(French Polynesia) Heimana Feuti	(Fiji) Sameer Ali (Tonga) Vatiaki Moala
Bantamweight (– 62 kg)	(New Caledonia) Kerim Belhameche	(French Polynesia) Paraita Brothers	(Tonga) Uhia Soakai Lang (Solomon Islands) Derick Afu
Featherweight (– 67 kg)	(French Polynesia) Doremce Rey	(New Caledonia) Reginard Sariman	(Guam) Nikko Pajarillaga (Solomon Islands) John Weneasi
Lightweight (– 72 kg)	(Tonga) Paula Sitapa	(New Caledonia) Houmine Wema	(French Polynesia) Heitoari Maufeme (Samoa) Ioane Pau
Welterweight (– 78 kg)	(French Polynesia) Barry Apeang	(Tonga) Namoa Sitapa	(Wallis and Futuna) Patita Vegi (Solomon Islands) Matthew Joe
Middleweight (– 84 kg)	(New Caledonia) John Troullet	(Tonga) Soane Tu'aliku	(Samoa) Simon Ah Him (Solomon Islands) Samsom Kwalea
Heavyweight (+ 84 kg)	(Samoa) Kaini Thomsem	(French Polynesia) Toamiriura Gatien	(New Caledonia) Lauris Jaquet (Tonga) Paula Tatafu
Team event	(French Polynesia) Tahiti	Solomon Islands	Tonga

=== Women ===
Event	Gold	Silver	Bronze
Fin-Flyweight (– 49 kg)	(French Polynesia) Raihau Tauitaha	(Solomon Islands) Ruth Riropo	n/a
Bantam-Featherweight (– 57 kg)	(French Polynesia) Averi Gatien	(Samoa) Sila Brown	n/a
Welter-Middleweight (– 67 kg)	(Wallis and Futuna) Jennifer Vegi	(French Polynesia) Hinarava Tetuanui	(New Caledonia) Samanta Jouanno (Samoa) Rhiannon O'Neill
Heavyweight (+ 67 kg)	(New Caledonia) Annie Odino	(Samoa) Lizzie Faafili	n/a

== See also ==
- Taekwondo at the Pacific Games
