= Va'a at the 2013 Pacific Mini Games =

- Location: Gahi

Va'a, also called the outrigger canoe, for the 2013 Pacific Mini Games, was held in Gahi village and its namesake bay area. It is located in the southeast coast of Wallis and Futuna. Competition for this sport was on the 3 to 6 September 2013.

== Medal table ==
Key:

* Host nation (Wallis and Futuna)

Rank	Nation	Gold	Silver	Bronze	Total
1	French Polynesia (TAH)	12	0	0	12
2	Wallis and Futuna (WLF)*	0	7	5	12
3	Papua New Guinea (PNG)	0	3	2	5
4	Palau (PLW)	0	2	0	2
5	Fiji (FIJ)	0	0	4	4
6	Tonga (TON)	0	0	1	1
Totals (6 entries)		12	12	12	36

== Medal summary ==
=== Men ===
Event	Gold	Silver	Bronze
V1 500m	Tahiti	Wallis and Futuna	Fiji
V6 500m	Tahiti	Wallis and Futuna	Papua New Guinea
V6 1,500m	Tahiti	Wallis and Futuna	Fiji
V12 500m	Tahiti	Wallis and Futuna	Tonga
V1 marathon 15 km	Isidore Tevaearai (TAH)	Penisio Talalua (WLF)	Kelekele Lausi (FIJ)
V6 marathon 30 km	Tahiti	Wallis and Futuna	Fiji

=== Women ===
Event	Gold	Silver	Bronze
V1 500m	Tahiti	Palau	Wallis and Futuna
V6 500m	Tahiti	Wallis and Futuna	Papua New Guinea
V6 1,500m	Tahiti	Papua New Guinea	Wallis and Futuna
V12 500m	Tahiti	Papua New Guinea	Wallis and Futuna
V1 marathon 10 km	Marguerite Temaiana (TAH)	Marina Toribiong (PLW)	Caroline Tauhola (WLF)
V6 marathon 20 km	Tahiti	Papua New Guinea	Wallis and Futuna
