= Jennifer Vegi =

Wallis and Futuna taekwondo practitioner

Medal record

Women's taekwondo

Representing Wallis and Futuna

South Pacific Games
Gold medal – first place	2007 Apia	67 kg

Jennifer Vegi is a female taekwondo practitioner from Wallis and Futuna. She won the gold medal in the women's 67 kg taekwondo event at the 2007 South Pacific Games.
