= Aganoa Beach =

Beach in Samoa

Coordinates: 13.767033°S 172.285919°W

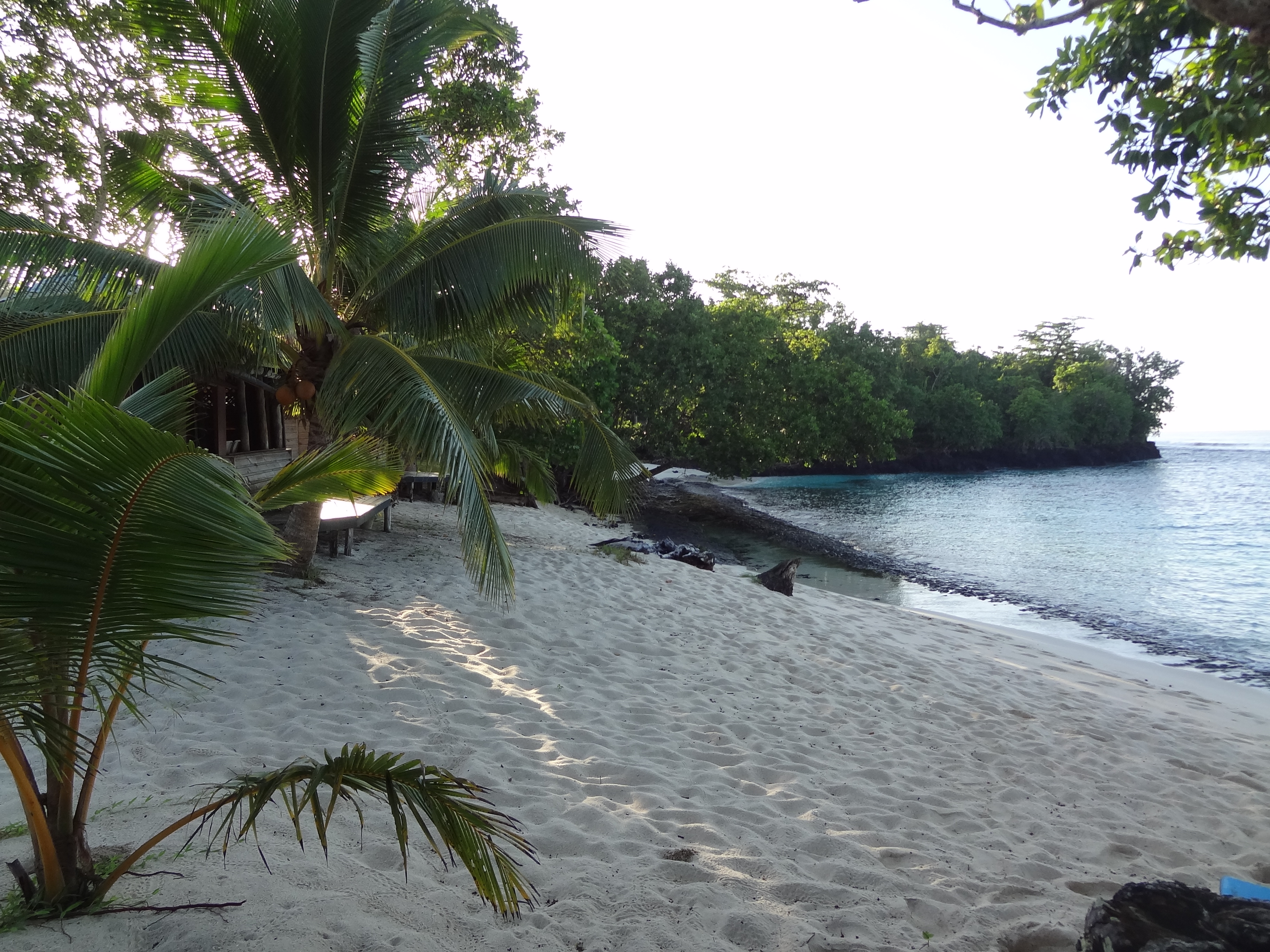
Aganoa Beach, 2011

Aganoa Beach is situated on the east coast of Savai'i island in Samoa. The waters off the beach are a known surf reef break in the region and were the venue for the surfing competition at the 2007 South Pacific Games. The left and right breaks are paddling distance from the beach.

There are beach fale on a white sandy beach run by locals for visitors. The beach is 15 minutes from Maota Airport.
