= 2013 Pacific Mini Games =

Multi-sport event held in Wallis and Futuna

IX Pacific Mini Games
- Host city: Mata Utu
- Country: (France) / Wallis and Futuna
- Motto: Pasifika Lena, Pasifika Pe'ia (French: Le Pacifique Autrement, Le Pacifique Simplement) (English: The Pacific Otherwise, Simply ... the Pacific)
- Nations: 22
- Events: 99 in 8 sports
- Opening: September 2, 2013
- Closing: September 12, 2013
- Opened by: François Hollande
- Main venue: Kafika Stadium

The 2013 Pacific Mini Games was the ninth edition of these Mini Games. They were held in Mata Utu in Wallis and Futuna from 2 to 12 September 2013. It was the first time the games had been held in Wallis and Futuna.

== Participating countries and territories ==
There were 22 nations at the 2013 games:

- American Samoa
- Cook Islands
- Fiji
- Guam
- Kiribati
- Marshall Islands
- Federated States of Micronesia
- New Caledonia
- Nauru
- Niue
- Norfolk Island
- Northern Mariana Islands
- Palau
- Papua New Guinea
- Samoa
- Solomon Islands
- Tahiti
- Tokelau
- Tonga
- Tuvalu
- Vanuatu
- Wallis and Futuna
* Note: The Marshall Islands team returned to compete at these Games after not participating in the 2009 Pacific Mini Games.

== Sports ==
Eight sports were contested for these games. Number of events for each sport is in brackets.

- Athletics (47)
- Beach volleyball (2)
- Rugby sevens (1)
- Sailing (6)
- Taekwondo (15)
- Outrigger canoe (Va'a) (12)
- Volleyball (2)
- Weightlifting (14)

== Venues ==
- Stade de Mata-Utu (also named as Stade de Kafika) – opening and closing ceremonies, athletics, and rugby sevens
- Kolopelu Place (Futuna Island) - beach volleyball
- Kafika Hall – taekwondo, volleyball, and weightlifting
- Bay of Gahi (beside the village of Gahi on Wallis Island) - va'a (outrigger canoe)
- Tekaviki Island (northeast from Mata-Utu on Wallis Island) – sailing

== Calendar ==
OC	Opening ceremony	●	Event competitions	1	Event finals	MC	Medal ceremony	CC	Closing ceremony

September 2013	2nd Mon	3rd Tue	4th Wed	5th Thu	6th Fri	7th Sat	8th Sun	9th Mon	10th Tue	11th Wed	12th Thu	Gold medals
Ceremonies	OC										CC	
Athletics		3	13	11	20							47
Beach volleyball					●	●		●	2			2
Rugby sevens									●	1		1
Sailing		●	●	●	●	●		●	●	●	MC	6
Taekwondo								6	9			15
Va'a (Outrigger canoe)		4	4	2	2							12
Volleyball		●	●	●	●	●		●	●	2		2
Weightlifting		4	5	5								14
Total gold medals		11	22	18	22			6	11	3	6	99
September 2013	2nd Mon	3rd Tue	4th Wed	5th Thu	6th Fri	7th Sat	8th Sun	9th Mon	10th Tue	11th Wed	12th Thu	Gold medals

== Medal table ==
Key: NOTE: This ranking does not include the six events in sailing, due to final results not present at the official website.

* Host nation (Wallis and Futuna)

Rank	Nation	Gold	Silver	Bronze	Total
1	French Polynesia (TAH)	26	6	4	36
2	Papua New Guinea (PNG)	21	23	23	67
3	New Caledonia (NCL)	18	10	6	34
4	Fiji (FIJ)	9	11	18	38
5	Samoa (SAM)	5	2	6	13
6	Wallis and Futuna (WLF)*	2	17	14	33
7	Solomon Islands (SOL)	2	6	5	13
8	Tonga (TON)	2	3	10	15
9	Kiribati (KIR)	2	1	1	4
10	Vanuatu (VAN)	2	0	6	8
11	Cook Islands (COK)	1	3	0	4
12	Tuvalu (TUV)	1	1	1	3
13	Marshall Islands (MHL)	1	1	0	2
14	Nauru (NRU)	1	0	2	3
15	Federated States of Micronesia (FSM)	1	0	0	1
16	Palau (PLW)	0	3	1	4
17	Niue (NIU)	0	1	0	1
18	Guam (GUM)	0	0	2	2
19	Norfolk Island (NFK)	0	0	1	1
Totals (19 entries)		94	88	100	282
