= 2007 South Pacific Games =

13th edition of the South Pacific Games

XIII South Pacific Games
- Official logo of the 2007 Games
- Host city: Apia, Upolu
- Country: Samoa
- Motto: Live the dream!
- Nations: 22
- Athletes: ~5,000
- Events: 33 sports
- Opening: 25 August 2007
- Closing: 8 September 2007
- Opened by: Tufuga Efi
- Torch lighter: Ofisa Ofisa
- Main venue: Apia Park

The 13th South Pacific Games (Samoan: Taʻaloga Lona-Sefulu-Tolu a le Pasefika i Saute), also known as Apia 2007, were held from 25 August to 8 September 2007 in Apia, Samoa. The Games were the thirteenth to be held since the inception of the South Pacific Games in 1963, and included traditional multi-sport event disciplines, such as athletics and swimming, alongside region-specific and smaller events such as outrigger canoeing, surfing and lawn bowls.

The principal venue for the Games was Apia Park, with other events taking place at the Faleata Sporting Complex and at other locations around Samoa. The cost of the games was reported to be US$92 million and resulted in significant government debt for Samoa due to infrastructure projects which included replacement bridges and roads.

== Sports ==
There were 33 sports contested at this edition of the games:

- Archery
- Athletics
- Badminton
- Baseball
- Basketball
- Beach volleyball
- Bodybuilding
- Boxing
- Cricket
- Football
- Golf
- Hockey
- Judo
- Lawn bowls
- Netball
- Outrigger canoeing
- Powerlifting
- Rugby league nines
- Rugby sevens
- Sailing
- Shooting
- Softball
- Squash
- Surfing
- Swimming
- Table tennis
- Taekwondo
- Tennis
- Touch rugby
- Triathlon
- Volleyball
- Weightlifting
- Wrestling

== Opening ceremony ==
The opening ceremony took place on 25 August 2007 at Apia Park Stadium and was performed in a traditional Samoan and Pacific style, welcoming some 5,000 athletes from 22 nations and territories to Samoa.

The ceremony was attended by Tuilaepa Aiono Sailele Malielegaoi, Prime Minister of Samoa (who also competed in the Games - see below), and Tuiatua Tupua Tamasese Efi, Head of State. Choreographed by Samoan contemporary dancer Alan Aiolupotea the ceremony featured dancing portraying the "mystical legends" from Samoa's island heritage (such as the stories of Sina and the Eel and Nafanua) with a five-year-old female fire dancer from Siumu Village performing a siva afi (or fire stick dance) accompanied by a Samoan song depicting the flow of lava following the 1905 eruptions near Savai'i being one of the showcase displays.

Former New Zealand Idol winner Rosita Vai sang an accompaniment to the torch lighting of the ceremonial flame by Ofisa Ofisa, a Samoan weightlifter.

Following a rest day on Sunday, the sporting events of the Games began on Monday, 27 August.

== Participation by Samoan Prime Minister ==
Samoan Prime Minister Tuilaepa Aiono Sailele Malielegaoi competed for his country at the Games in the sport of target archery. In participating in the Games, the Prime Minister became the first elected leader to represent his country at a multi-sport event.

Having taken up the sport only 5 months prior to the Games, Tuilaepa was ranked second in Samoa in the combined bow discipline. The Prime Minister's son was also a reserve team member.

On day 10 of the Games, Tuilaepa won a silver medal in the mixed recurve team play event.

== Logistical problems ==
Problems with equipment and the lack of multi-sport event infrastructures within the region created difficulties throughout the Games.

The decathlon was reduced to eight disciplines due to a shortage of equipment. The poles for the pole vault were still in Melbourne after the ship due to deliver them was delayed by poor weather and the high jump was the discipline cancelled to allow the event to comply with IAAF regulations (there is no IAAF-sanctioned nine discipline event). In addition, the 1500 metre race was reduced to 1 km. The women's 400-metre hurdles and men's discus were also affected.

The lack of funding and facilities for drug testing also restricted the ability of Games authorities to run a full drug testing and anti-doping programme at the Games. Only one hundred athletes (primarily in high-risk events such as bodybuilding and weightlifting) were due to be tested as samples needed to be flown overseas from Samoa to be processed at a cost of A$500 per sample.

Fireworks due to feature in the Closing Ceremony also remained in Melbourne after difficulties transporting them by ship to Samoa.

== Religious controversies ==
The religious sensitivities of the host nation (which is primarily Congregationalist Christian) and other participants resulted in several controversial decisions during the organisation and running of the Games.

Athletes in the women's beach volleyball event were required to wear shorts and T-shirts as opposed to the regulation bikini-style outfits to avoid offending family members and other spectators.

A leaked internal memo by Team Samoa authorities was circulated prior to the event warning Samoan athletes not to engage in homosexual intercourse declaring it as "ungodly", stating: "do not embarrass yourself, your family and your country by trying this in the village...Best not to even think about this. It's against the law of God!" Such activity is prohibited under Samoan law and punishable by up to five years' imprisonment. However, the ban on homosexual intercourse was later lifted by organising committee chairman Tapasu Lueng Wai.

A campaign to issue athletes condoms and advice on sexually transmitted infections also met with resistance from religious leaders. The Archbishop of the Catholic Church in Samoa, Alapati Mataeliga suggested that, in doing so, the authorities were encouraging extra-marital sexual activity which was frowned upon by the church. Games authorities also back-tracked on plans to issue athletes with female condoms after fears it might "expose young athletes to sex." Male condoms were nevertheless distributed.

== Closing ceremony ==
The closing ceremony for the Games again took place at Apia Park. Attended by some 20,000 spectators, a twelve-minute fireworks display brought proceedings to an end before hundreds of balloons were released in the colours of the Games flag which was itself duly lowered and the ceremonial flame extinguished.

The flag was then passed to New Caledonia delegates, supported by a Kanak cultural group, ahead of the 2011 Pacific Games in Noumea.

== Venues ==
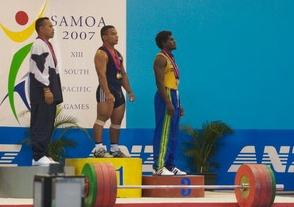
Gold medalist Manuel Minginfel of the Federated States of Micronesia on the medal dais with fellow weightlifting competitors from the 56 kg weight class.

A significant amount of the pre-Games expenditure was spent on building new facilities and upgrading those already in existence in Samoa. The majority of the new facilities were sited at the Faleata Sports Complex at Tuana'imato. However, many Samoans feared the size of the complex and other construction would lead to the venues becoming significant white elephants after the Games were over.

- Aganoa Beach - Surfing
- Apia Park Sports Complex

Gymnasium - Table Tennis and Badminton
Stadium - Athletics, Rugby Union and Touch Football
Netball Courts - Netball
Tennis Courts - Tennis

- Fagalii - Royal Samoa Golf Course - Golf
- Faleata Sports Complex

Samoa Aquatic Centre - Swimming
Archery Field - Archery
Baseball Field - Baseball
Beach Volleyball Courts - Beach Volleyball
Toleafoa S. Blatter Stadium - Soccer
Cricket ovals - Cricket
Gymnasium 1 - Boxing, Weightlifting, Body Building
Gymnasium 2 - Squash and Basketball
Hockey Fields - Hockey
Sports Centre - Judo, Taekwondo, Power Lifting, Wrestling
Lawn Bowls Centre - Lawn Bowls
Squash Courts - Squash

- Samoa Turf Club - Softball
- Marist Stadium - Rugby League
- Mulifanua Water Sports - Va'a (Outrigger) Canoeing; Sailing
- Triathlon course - Triathlon
- Tafaigata Shooting Range - Shooting
- National University of Samoa - Gymnasium - Indoor Volleyball

== Medal table ==
New Caledonia topped the medal count.

* Host nation (Samoa)

Rank	Nation	Gold	Silver	Bronze	Total
1	New Caledonia	90	69	68	227
2	Tahiti	44	43	31	118
3	Samoa*	43	33	50	126
4	Fiji	39	54	43	136
5	Papua New Guinea	38	24	32	94
6	Nauru	15	9	12	36
7	Palau	9	4	3	16
8	Federated States of Micronesia	6	6	1	13
9	Cook Islands	5	9	8	22
10	Tonga	3	14	10	27
11	American Samoa	3	8	11	22
12	Tokelau	3	1	1	5
13	Wallis and Futuna	3	0	1	4
14	Vanuatu	2	1	9	12
15	Solomon Islands	1	12	14	27
16	Guam	1	2	7	10
17	Kiribati	0	4	2	6
18	Marshall Islands	0	1	1	2
18	Niue	0	1	1	2
18	Tuvalu	0	1	1	2
21	Norfolk Island	0	1	0	1
22	Northern Mariana Islands	0	0	0	0
Totals (22 entries)		305	297	306	908

== See also ==
- Athletics at the 2007 Pacific Games
- Cricket at the 2007 South Pacific Games
- Football at the 2007 South Pacific Games
- Taekwondo at the 2007 South Pacific Games

== Sources ==
- 2007 South Pacific Games Results. Oceania Sport Information Centre (Report). Archived from the original on 31 October 2015.
