= Baseball at the Pacific Games =

- Baseball pictogram
- Frequency: Every four years
- Inaugurated: 1999 (Guam) Santa Rita
- Most recent: 2011 (New Caledonia) Nouméa
- Most successful team(s): Guam (GUM)

Baseball at the Pacific Games is one of 20 optional sports approved by the Pacific Games Council and was first contested at the 1999 South Pacific Games in Santa Rita. It was played at each edition through the 2011 Pacific Games in Nouméa. The sport was then dropped from the Pacific Games program and has not re-appeared ever since.

== Results ==
Edition	Year	Official host	Final			Bronze medal match			No. of teams
Edition	Year	Official host	Gold medal	Score	Runners-up	Third place	Score	Fourth place	No. of teams
1	1999	Guam	Guam		American Samoa	Federated States of Micronesia		Palau	
2	2003	Fiji	Guam	11–3	American Samoa	Federated States of Micronesia	4–3	Palau	
3	2007	Samoa	Palau	Round-robin	New Caledonia	American Samoa	Round-robin	Fiji	5
4	2011	New Caledonia	Northern Mariana Islands	8–4	Guam	Palau	—N/a	New Caledonia	6

== Medal table ==
Rank	Nation	Gold	Silver	Bronze	Total
1	Guam	2	1	0	3
2	Palau	1	0	1	2
3	Northern Mariana Islands	1	0	0	1
4	American Samoa	0	2	1	3
5	New Caledonia	0	1	0	1
6	Federated States of Micronesia	0	0	2	2
Totals (6 entries)		4	4	4	12

== Pacific Mini Games ==
=== Editions ===
Edition	Year	Official host	Final			Bronze medal match			No. of teams
Edition	Year	Official host	Gold medal	Score	Runners-up	Third place	Score	Fourth place	No. of teams
1	2005	Palau	Guam		Palau	Federated States of Micronesia		New Caledonia	
2	2022	Northern Mariana Islands	Northern Mariana Islands		Guam	Palau		Fiji	5
3	2025	Palau	Palau	8–1	Guam	Northern Mariana Islands	15–5	Federated States of Micronesia	5

=== Medal table ===
Rank	Nation	Gold	Silver	Bronze	Total
1	Guam	1	2	0	3
2	Palau	1	1	1	3
3	Northern Mariana Islands	1	0	1	2
4	Federated States of Micronesia	0	0	1	1
Totals (4 entries)		3	3	3	9

== See also ==
- Oceania Baseball Championship
- Baseball at the Micronesian Games
- Baseball awards § Oceania
