= Football in Palau =

- Country: Palau
- Governing body: Palau Football Association
- National team: men's national team

Flag of Palau

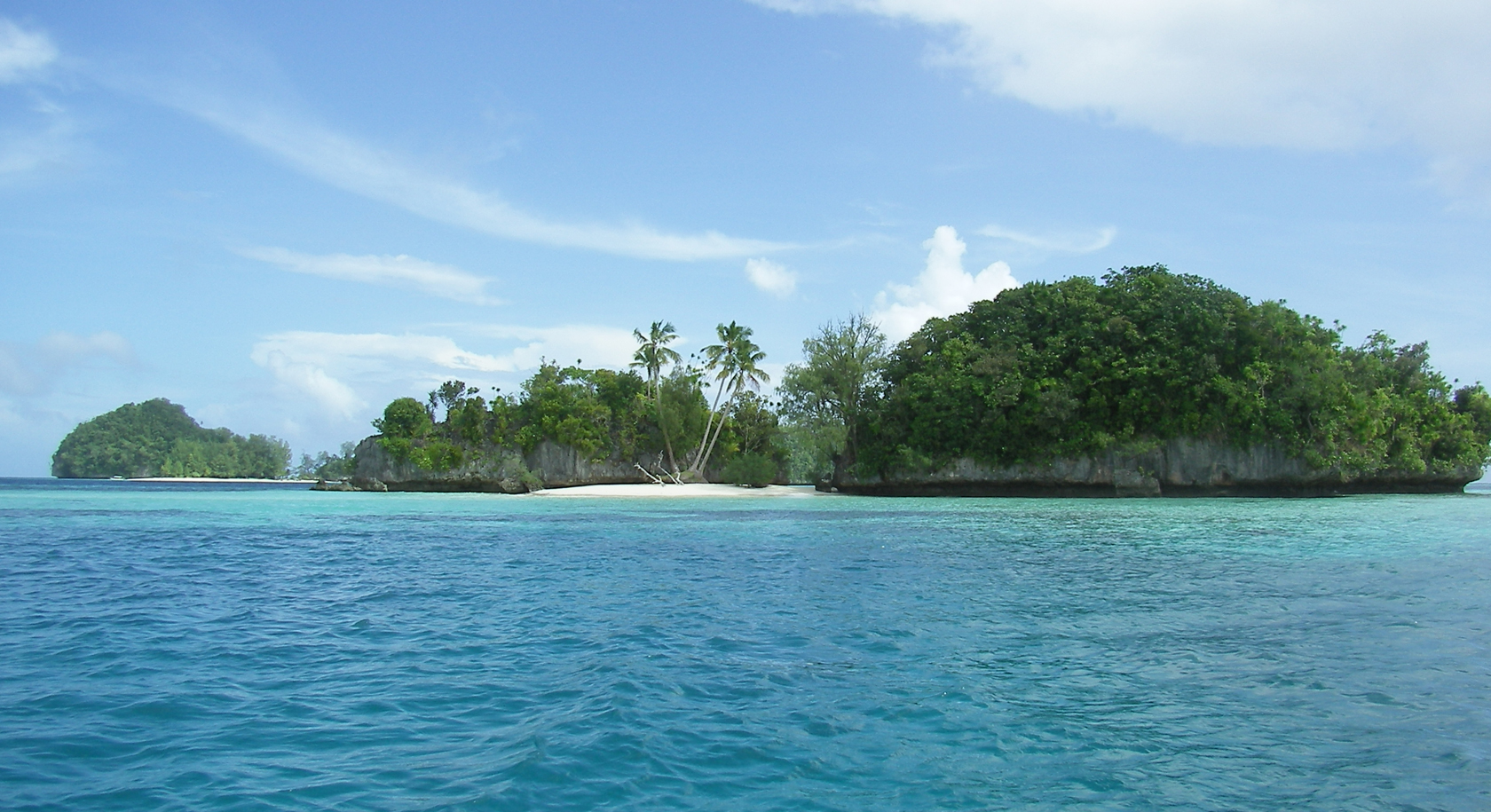
Palau is one of few sovereign states not to be a member of FIFA.

The sport of association football in the country of Palau is run by the Palau Soccer Association. The association administers the national football team, and formerly also the Palau Soccer League.

== International Football ==
Palau is one of the few sovereign states not to be a FIFA member and is only an associate member of the OFC. This means the nation does not have a national team competing in OFC Nations Cup qualifiers or FIFA World Cup qualifiers.

The Palau national team instead tend to play small-scale matches against other non-FIFA members. They play their matches at the 4,000 capacity PCC Track and Field Stadium (National Stadium) in the old capital of Koror.

== Domestic football ==
=== Senior Club football ===
There does not seem to be fixed clubs in Palau. Instead, teams are put together only once a year, for the Palau Soccer League. Team Bangladesh is the oldest club in Palau, founded in 2004.

==== Palau Soccer League ====
The Palau Soccer League was the only adult league in Palau. It was first played in 2004, and has not been played since the outbreak of the COVID-19 pandemic.

=== Youth club football ===
==== Palau Youth Soccer League ====
As well as the adult league, the Palau Youth Soccer League was started in 2013. It was not played in 2014, but was again played from 2015 to 2017. Since 2017 the competition has not been held.

Winners:

- 2013 - Koror Rising Stars
- 2014 - not held
- 2015 - Ngeremlengui
- 2016 - MSS Saints
- 2017 - MSS Saints

=== Belau Games ===
In addition to the Palau Soccer League, football has also been introduced to the Belau Games, which are held once every two years. Unlike the Palau Soccer League which is club based, this appears to be a regional football competition. Soccer was first played in the Belau Games in 2009, but the first season where results are known is 2011. Soccer was also planned to be played in the 2007 Belau Games, but in the end it was not held.

After a hiatus the sport reappeared in 2017, and was played again in 2019.

== National football stadium ==
Stadium	Capacity	City
National Stadium	4,000	Koror City

== See also ==
- Palau national football team
- Palau Soccer Association
- Palau Soccer League
- List of football clubs in Palau
