= 2014 Palau Soccer League =

Palau Soccer League
- Season: 2014
- Champions: Kramers FC
- Matches played: 23 (planned, including KOs), (18 so far)
- Goals scored: 92 (4 per match) (so far)
- Biggest home win: Team Friendship 3–0 New Stars FC (25, 27 or 29 May 2014)
- Biggest away win: Surangel Kings 0–14 Kramers FC (18 or 20 May 2014)
- Highest scoring: Surangel Kings 0–14 Kramers FC (18 or 20 May 2014)

The 2014 Palau Soccer League is the ninth season of association football competition in Palau, and it also marks ten years since the league began in 2004. The 2014 League was competed by five teams from Palau. The league will be played in a round-robin format, with the top four teams qualifying for the semi-finals. This is the first season of football in Palau since the 2012 Fall season, as that season stretched into 2013. The round robin stage began on April 13, and will end on June 15. The Semi-finals and Final will then take place on June 22 and June 29 respectively.

== Match format ==
Unlike other seasons (and other association football matches), the matches of the 2014 Palau Soccer League have a set of unique rules. These are:

- Teams will be 9-a-side, instead of the usual 11-a-side.
- Matches will be 60 minutes long (30 minutes per half), instead of the usual 90 minutes.

== Teams ==
Five teams competed in this season of the Palau Soccer League. All matches were played at the PCC Track & Field Stadium in Koror, home stadium to all the teams. This was due to the lack of suitable venues for soccer matches in Palau. The teams for 2014 (listed in alphabetical order) were:

- Kramers FC
- Lyon FC
- New Stars FC
- Surangel Kings FC
- Team Friendship FC

The location of the PCC Track & Field Stadium, where all games took place:

Koror
PCC Track & Field Stadium
7°20′N 134°28′E
Capacity: 4,000

== League stage ==
=== League standings ===
As of 27 June 2014

Pos	Team	Pld	W	D	L	GF	GA	GD	Pts	Qualification
1	Team Friendship (A)	8	7	0	1	27	9	+18	21	Qualification for Semi-Finals
2	Kramers FC (A)	8	5	0	3	28	12	+16	15	Qualification for Semi-Finals
3	New Stars FC (A)	8	2	2	4	18	21	−3	8	Qualification for Semi-Finals
4	Lyon FC (A)	8	2	2	4	18	28	−10	8	Qualification for Semi-Finals
5	Surangel Kings	8	1	2	5	17	38	−21	5	

Updated to match(es) played on 1 June 2014. Source:
Rules for classification: 1) points; 2) goal difference; 3) number of goals scored.
(A) Advance to a further round

=== Results ===
The fixture list was announced on the Palau Soccer Association website.

==== Week 1 ====
13 April 2014
5.45pm

Lyon FC	0–3	Team Friendship
	Source	Unknown

Palau Track and Field Stadium
13 April 2014
7.00pm

Surangel Kings	0–5	Kramers FC
	Source	Unknown

Palau Track and Field Stadium

==== Week 2 ====
20 or 22 April 2014

Lyon FC	2–2	Surangel Kings
M.Bitu 39' 50'	Source	Joseph 4'; Bernie 42'

Palau Track and Field Stadium
20 or 22 April 2014

Team Friendship	4–2	New Stars FC
M.Miah 7'; Ashito 22'; Depak 42'; Tiger 60'	Source	Thomas 18' 35'

Palau Track and Field Stadium

==== Week 3 ====
27 April 2014
5.45pm

Lyon FC	2–2	New Stars FC
M.Bitu 8' 14'	Source	Jose 9' 41'

Palau Track and Field Stadium
27 April 2014
7.00pm

Team Friendship	1–0	Kramers FC
Tiger 46'	Source

Palau Track and Field Stadium

==== Week 4 ====
4 or 7 May 2014

Lyon FC	0–6	Kramers FC
	Source	T.Ililau 10' 40'; C.Reklai Mitchell 26'; J.McComb 38' 56'; D.Shipper 52'

Palau Track and Field Stadium
4 or 7 May 2014

Surangel Kings	4–2	New Stars FC
B.Dambo 12'; A.Canseco 17' 23'; J.Ulap 47'	Source	Unknown

Palau Track and Field Stadium

==== Week 5 ====
11 May 2014
5.45pm

Team Friendship	3–2	Surangel Kings
R.Khadka 6'; M.Miah 29'; Juguru 36'	Source	A.Canseco 19' 55'

Palau Track and Field Stadium
11 May 2014
7.00pm

Kramers FC	1–3	New Stars FC
J.Jonas 46'	Source	David 20'; Oskar 51'; Fabio 53'

Palau Track and Field Stadium

==== Week 6 ====
18 May 2014
5.45pm

Lyon FC	1–2	Team Friendship
Unknown	Source	Unknown

Palau Track and Field Stadium
18 or 20 May 2014

Surangel Kings	0–14	Kramers FC
	Source	Unknown

Palau Track and Field Stadium

==== Week 7 ====
25, 27 or 29 May 2014

Surangel Kings	5–7	Lyon FC
Unknown	Source	Unknown

Palau Track and Field Stadium
25, 27 or 29 May 2014

Team Friendship	3–0	New Stars FC
Unknown	Source

Palau Track and Field Stadium

==== Week 8 ====
1 June 2014
5.45pm

Team Friendship	1–3	Kramers FC
M.Miah 25'	Source	T.Ililau 10'; J.McComb 29'; C.Reklai Mitchell 48'

Palau Track and Field Stadium
1 June 2014
7.00pm

Lyon FC	1–4	New Stars FC
Dexter 24'	Source	Nasa 4' 48'; David 12' 32'

Palau Track and Field Stadium

==== Week 9 ====
8 June 2014
5.45pm

Surangel Kings	3–3	New Stars FC
A.Canseco 3' 36' 39'	Source	Nasa 37' 52'; David 50'

Palau Track and Field Stadium
8 June 2014
7.00pm

Lyon FC	5–4	Kramers FC
C.E.Nicolescu 6' 43'; M.Roman 30'; M.Sasao 43'; P.Remengesau 49'	Source	T.Ililau 14'; C.Reklai Mitchell 26' 55' 57'

Palau Track and Field Stadium

==== Week 10 ====
15 or 22 June 2014

Kramers FC	3–2	New Stars FC
own goal 15'; C.Reklai Mitchell 35' 40'	Source	Jose 20'; Francois 55'

Palau Track and Field Stadium
15 or 22 June

Team Friendship	10–1	Surangel Kings
Nishita 10' 12' 25' 27' 37' 55'; Guru 45' 47' 58'; Tiger 57'	Source	A.Canseco 17'

Palau Track and Field Stadium

== Knockout stage ==
Semi-finals
22 June – Koror
Team Friendship	1
Lyon FC	0
22 June – Koror
Kramers FC	5
New Stars FC	0

Final
29 June – Koror
Team Friendship	1
Kramers FC	3

=== Semi-finals ===
22 June 2014
5.45pm

Team Friendship	1–0	Lyon FC
M.Miah 17'

Palau Track and Field Stadium
22 June 2014
7.00pm

Kramers FC	5–0	New Stars FC
C.Reklai Mitchell 25', 55'; T.Ililau 33', 40', 58'

Palau Track and Field Stadium

=== Final ===
29 June 2014
6.00pm

Team Friendship	1–3	Kramers FC
M.Miah 22'		C.Reklai Mitchell 10'; T.Ililau 52', 56'

Palau Track and Field Stadium
