= Baseball at the 2025 Pacific Mini Games =

- Baseball pictogram
- Venue: Nippon Stadium
- Location: Koror, Palau
- Dates: 30 June – 7 July
- Nations: 5

Medalists
gold medal	Palau
silver medal	Guam
bronze medal	Northern Mariana Islands

Baseball was contested at the 2025 Pacific Mini Games, held from 30 June to 8 July, 2025 at the Nippon Stadium in Koror, Palau. Five national teams are scheduled to compete in the tournament.

Palau defeated Guam in the final to capture the gold medal. while the Northern Mariana Islands secured the bronze.

== Participating nations ==
Five countries and territories entered baseball teams for the Mini Games, with the Northern Mariana Islands entering the competition as the defending champions.

- Federated States of Micronesia (20)
- Fiji (20)
- Guam (20)
- Northern Mariana Islands (20)
- Palau (20) (Host)

== Medalists ==
Event	Gold	Silver	Bronze
Men's tournament	Palau; Avery Amos; Dusty Etpison; Flavin Flavin Jr. John Ililau; Jeter Inawo; Olkeriil Ise; Tejada Kumaichi; Joshua Mathew; Young Mikel; Pipen Mitsur; Peasley Ngiraibakes; Taylor Ngirblekuu; Kedson Rechemang; Ray Rumong; Ortiz Sadang; Dion Sadao; Seth Seklii; Omengkar Tadao; Doveson Tesei; O'Neill Yobech	Guam; Evan Acosta; Ayden Aguon; Sean Balauro; Javier Concepción; Peter Concepción; Nolan Cruz; Ricardo Leon Guerrero; Zachary Muna; Franklin Ninete; Javen Pangelinan; Marko Parks; John Salas; Ashton Tedtaotao; Guaifon Terlaje; Brandon Tuquero; Kaiden Weakley; Arren Yatar; Athan Yatar	Northern Mariana Islands; Elijah Aughenbaugh; Jerald Cabrera; Brian Camacho; Nathan Camacho; Jose Deleon Guerrero; Spencer Richard Dickinson; Lamarc Iguel; Joshua John Jones; Darion Jones; Benjamin Jones Jr. Francisco Lieto; Joseph Lifoifoi; Franko Nakamura; Harry Nakamura Jr. John Sablan; Anthony Salas; Nokki Saralu; Jeremiah Suel III; Anthony Tenorio; Kevin Villagomez

== Tournament ==
=== Round robin stage ===
Pos	Team	Pld	W	L	RF	RA	RD	PCT	GB	Qualification
1	Guam	4	3	1	38	20	+18	.750	—	Gold medal match
2	Palau (H)	4	3	1	38	20	+18	.750	—	Gold medal match
3	Micronesia	4	2	2	26	23	+3	.500	1	Bronze medal match
4	Northern Mariana Islands	4	2	2	32	31	+1	.500	1	Bronze medal match
5	Fiji	4	0	4	10	50	−40	.000	3	

Source: WBSC
(H) Hosts

=== Bronze medal match ===
July 8, 2025 10:00 am (PWT) at Nippon Stadium in Koror, Palau
Team	1	2	3	4	5	6	7	8	9	10	R	H	E
Northern Mariana Islands (bronze)	3	0	4	3	5	-	-	-	-	-	15	13	2
Micronesia	0	3	0	2	0	-	-	-	-	-	5	3	5
WP: Anthony Tenorio LP: Walter Ladore Jr. Boxscore

=== Gold medal match ===
July 8, 2025 1:30 pm (PWT) at Nippon Stadium in Koror, Palau
Team	1	2	3	4	5	6	7	8	9	10	R	H	E
Palau (gold)	0	2	0	1	0	0	5	-	-	-	8	7	3
Guam (silver)	1	0	0	0	0	0	0	-	-	-	1	7	2
WP: Joshua Mathew LP: Sean Balauro; Boxscore

== Final standings ==
Place	Team	Record
Gold	Palau	4–1
Silver	Guam	3–2
Bronze	Northern Mariana Islands	3–2
4	Micronesia	2–3
5	Fiji	0–4
