= List of football clubs in Palau =

List of association football clubs in Palau. The Palau Soccer League has not been played since 2019, so all clubs listed are defunct.

== List ==
=== Palau Soccer League ===
Teams known to have competed in the Palau Soccer League:

- Belau Kanu Club - Competed in the 2012 season.
- Biib Strykers - Competed in the 2012 Spring league.
- Daewoo Ngatpang - Champions in 2004 and 2010. Not known whether they competed in any other seasons.
- Kramers - Champions in 2008 and 2014, also competed in 2012 and were runners-up in 2016.
- Lyon - Competed in the 2014 season.
- Melekeok - Champions in 2009. Not known if they competed in any other seasons, though they definitely did not compete in either 2004, 2006–07 or 2010 seasons.
- Mount Everest Nepal - Known to have competed in 2004 and 2006–07 seasons.
- New Stars - Competed in the 2012 Fall and 2014 seasons.
- Palau Tiger Team - Known to have competed in the 2006–07 season.
- Palau Track and Field Team - Known to have competed in the 2004 season.
- Surangel and Sons Company - Champions in 2006 and 2016.
- Surangel Kings - Competed in the 2014 season.
- Taj - Known as Mason's Taj during the 2012 Spring League, and champions during the 2012 Fall League.
- Team Bangladesh - Three times champions in 2005, 2007 and in the 2012 Spring League and most successful team in Palau.
- Team Friendship - Competed in the 2014 season.
- Universal Peace Foundation - Known to have competed in the 2004 season.

=== Other ===
Teams not known to have ever played in the Palau Soccer League:

- Airai FC - Founded in 2017, runners-up in the 2017 Palau Youth Soccer League.
- All Stars - Competed in the 2015 Palau Youth Soccer League.
- Belau Stars - Competed in the 2013 Palau Youth Soccer League.
- Carlsbad United - Competed in the 2015 Palau Youth Soccer League.
- KES Starts - Runners-up in the 2016 Palau Youth Soccer League.
- Koror Rising Stars - Champions in the 2013 Palau Youth Soccer League, also competed in 2015.
- MSS Saints - Champions in the 2016 and 2017 Palau Youth Soccer League seasons.
- Ngeremlengui - Champions in the 2015 Palau Youth Soccer League.
- Wild Youth - Had A and B teams competing in the 2013 Palau Youth Soccer League.
- Teams representing the states of Palau have played in the football section of the Belau Games, however these are not football clubs.
