= Baseball at the 2011 Pacific Games =

- Dates: August 29 – September 8

Baseball at the 2011 Pacific Games in Nouméa, New Caledonia was held on August 29–September 8, 2011.

== Results ==
Event	Gold	Silver	Bronze
Men	Northern Mariana Islands	Guam	Palau

== Participating teams ==
- American Samoa
- Fiji
- Guam
- New Caledonia
- Northern Mariana Islands
- Palau

== Preliminary round ==
Team	Pld	W	L	RF	RA
Palau	5	4	1	31	5
Guam	5	4	1	33	12
New Caledonia	5	3	2	23	10
Northern Mariana Islands	5	3	2	19	14
Fiji	5	1	4	12	37
American Samoa	5	0	5	9	49

29 August 2011 09:00 at Baseball Mont-Dore, Mont-Dore
Team	1	2	3	4	5	6	7	R	H	E
New Caledonia	0	0	0	1	0	0	0	1	7	2
Guam	0	1	1	1	0	0	X	3	6	1
Attendance: 200; Boxscore

29 August 2011 13:00 at Baseball Mont-Dore, Mont-Dore
Team	1	2	3	4	5	6	7	R	H	E
American Samoa	0	0	0	0	0	0	2	2	5	3
Fiji	0	0	2	0	6	0	X	8	8	2
Attendance: 125; Boxscore

30 August 2011 09:00 at Baseball Mont-Dore, Mont-Dore
Team	1	2	3	4	5	6	7	8	9	R	H	E
Palau	0	0	0	0	0	0	0	0	0	0	4	1
Northern Mariana Islands	0	0	0	0	0	0	0	0	1	1	8	2
Attendance: 50; Boxscore

30 August 2011 13:00 at Baseball Mont-Dore, Mont-Dore
Team	1	2	3	4	5	R	H	E
Fiji	0	0	0	1	0	1	0	4
Guam	4	1	1	2	3	11	9	3
Attendance: 25; Boxscore

31 August 2011 09:00 at Baseball Mont-Dore, Mont-Dore
Team	1	2	3	4	5	R	H	E
Palau	3	2	2	5	0	12	9	1
American Samoa	0	0	0	0	0	0	3	3
Attendance: 30; Boxscore

31 August 2011 13:00 at Baseball Mont-Dore, Mont-Dore
Team	1	2	3	4	5	6	7	R	H	E
New Caledonia	0	0	0	0	0	0	3	3	4	5
Northern Mariana Islands	0	0	1	0	0	0	1	2	4	2
Attendance: 150; Boxscore

1 September 2011 09:00 at Baseball Mont-Dore, Mont-Dore
Team	1	2	3	4	5	6	7	R	H	E
Fiji	0	1	0	0	0	0	0	1	2	6
Palau	0	1	0	6	1	2	3	13	10	1
Attendance: 50; Boxscore

1 September 2011 13:00 at Baseball Mont-Dore, Mont-Dore
Team	1	2	3	4	5	6	7	R	H	E
New Caledonia	1	0	0	2	1	4	1	9	12	1
American Samoa	1	0	1	0	0	0	0	2	4	6
Attendance: 225; Boxscore

2 September 2011 09:00 at Baseball Mont-Dore, Mont-Dore
Team	1	2	3	4	5	6	7	R	H	E
Northern Mariana Islands	1	0	3	0	0	1	0	5	9	2
Guam	3	0	1	0	0	2	X	6	7	2
Attendance: 80; Boxscore

2 September 2011 13:00 at Baseball Mont-Dore, Mont-Dore
Team	1	2	3	4	5	6	7	8	9	R	H	E
New Caledonia	0	0	0	0	1	0	0	0	0	1	4	4
Palau	0	0	0	1	0	0	0	0	1	2	4	0
Attendance: 100; Boxscore

3 September 2011 07:30 at Baseball Mont-Dore, Mont-Dore
Team	1	2	3	4	5	6	7	R	H	E
American Samoa	0	0	0	4	0	0	0	4	5	2
Northern Mariana Islands	1	2	4	0	2	0	0	9	9	3
Attendance: 25; Boxscore

3 September 2011 10:30 at Baseball Mont-Dore, Mont-Dore
Team	1	2	3	4	5	6	7	R	H	E
Guam	2	0	0	0	0	0	0	2	4	2
Palau	0	0	0	2	1	0	1	4	8	1
Attendance: 75; Boxscore

5 September 2011 08:00 at Baseball Mont-Dore, Mont-Dore
Team	1	2	3	4	5	6	7	R	H	E
New Caledonia	5	1	0	1	0	0	2	9	5	1
Fiji	0	0	0	0	0	0	1	1	4	2
Attendance: 50; Boxscore

5 September 2011 08:00 at Baseball Mont-Dore, Mont-Dore
Team	1	2	3	4	5	6	7	8	R	H	E
Fiji	0	0	0	1	0	0	0	0	1	2	1
Northern Mariana Islands	0	0	1	0	0	0	0	1	2	4	2
Boxscore

5 September 2011 13:00 at Baseball Mont-Dore, Mont-Dore
Team	1	2	3	4	5	6	7	R	H	E
Guam	1	3	2	2	0	3	X	11	16	2
American Samoa	0	0	0	1	0	0	X	1	4	1
Attendance: 40; Boxscore

== Knockout stage ==
=== Bracket ===
Semifinals
1	Palau	0
2	Guam	4
3	New Caledonia	5
4	Northern Mariana Islands	11

Bronze medal game
1	Palau	0
4	Northern Mariana Islands	8

Gold medal game
2	Guam	4
4	Northern Mariana Islands	8

=== Semifinals ===
6 September 2011 08:05 at Baseball Mont-Dore, Mont-Dore
Team	1	2	3	4	5	6	7	8	9	R	H	E
Palau	0	0	0	0	0	0	0	0	X	0	6	3
Guam	0	1	0	0	2	0	0	1	0	4	4	1
Attendance: 100; Boxscore

7 September 2011 09:00 at Baseball Mont-Dore, Mont-Dore
Team	1	2	3	4	5	6	7	8	9	R	H	E
New Caledonia	0	1	4	0	0	0	0	0	0	5	8	9
Northern Mariana Islands	2	0	1	1	0	1	0	6	0	11	11	3
Attendance: 100; Boxscore

=== Fifth place game ===
6 September 2011 12:35 at Baseball Mont-Dore, Mont-Dore
Team	1	2	3	4	5	6	7	8	R	H	E
Fiji	0	1	0	0	1	1	4	1	8	10	6
American Samoa	0	1	3	0	0	3	4	1	7	9	1
Attendance: 50; Boxscore

=== Small final ===
7 September 2011 13:00 at Baseball Mont-Dore, Mont-Dore
Team	1	2	3	4	5	6	7	8	9	R	H	E
Northern Mariana Islands	0	0	0	2	3	1	1	1	0	8	12	0
Palau	0	0	0	0	0	0	0	0	0	0	1	6
Attendance: 70; Boxscore

=== Final ===
8 September 2011 10:00 at Baseball Mont-Dore, Mont-Dore
Team	1	2	3	4	5	6	7	8	9	R	H	E
Guam	2	0	1	0	0	1	0	0	0	4	–	–
Northern Mariana Islands	0	0	4	0	1	0	0	2	X	8	–	–
