= 2006–07 Palau Soccer League =

Palau Soccer League
- Season: 2006–07
- Champions: Team Bangladesh
- Relegated: None
- Matches played: 22
- Goals scored: 94 (4.27 per match)
- Top goalscorer: Tony Ililau, 9
- Biggest home win: Team Bangladesh 9–1 Palau Tiger Team
- Biggest away win: Surangel and Sons Company 1–8 Team Bangladesh
- Highest scoring: Mount Everest Nepal 3–8 Palau Tiger Team

The 2006–07 Palau Soccer League was the fourth season of association football competition in Palau and the first to straddle two calendar years. The league was won by Team Bangladesh, their second title.

== Teams ==
Five teams competed in the 2006–07 season of the Palau Soccer League. All matches were played at the PCC Track & Field Stadium in Koror, home stadium to all the teams. This was due to the lack of suitable venues for soccer matches in Palau. The teams for 2006–07 (listed in alphabetical order) were:

- Mount Everest Nepal FC
- Palau Tiger Team FC
- Surangel and Sons Company FC
- Team Bangladesh FC
- Universal Peace Foundation FC

The location of the PCC Track & Field Stadium, where all games took place:

Koror
PCC Track & Field Stadium
7°20′N 134°28′E
Capacity: 4,000

== League stage ==
=== Standings ===
Pos	Team	Pld	W	D	L	GF	GA	GD	Pts	Qualification
1	Surangel and Sons Company (A)	7	5	1	1	25	11	+14	16	Qualification for Semi-Finals
2	Team Bangladesh (Palau) (A)	6	4	0	2	30	9	+21	12	Qualification for Semi-Finals
3	Mount Everest Nepal (A)	6	3	1	2	16	14	+2	10	Qualification for Semi-Finals
4	Palau Tiger Team (A)	7	2	2	3	18	26	−8	8	Qualification for Semi-Finals
5	Universal Peace Foundation	6	0	0	6	5	34	−29	0	

Updated to match(es) played on 4 Nov 2011. Source: https://www.rsssf.org/tablesp/palau07.html
Rules for classification: 1) points; 2) goal difference; 3) number of goals scored. Note: Table incomplete as five results unknown, see notes to results for more details.
(A) Advance to a further round

=== Result table ===
The league consisted of home and away games, from which the top two teams qualified for a one-legged semi final to determine who would play for the championship. The losers of the semi-finals would enter the third-place playoff.

Home \ Away	MEN	PTT	SSC	TBP	UPF
Mount Everest Nepal		– (Note: Precise result of match between Mount Everest Nepal and Palau Tiger Team is unknown but is known to have been a draw.)	-	3–2	6–0
Palau Tiger Team	1–0		0–6	1–4	7–3
Surangel and Sons Company	4–0	1–1		1–8	2–1
Team Bangladesh (Palau)		9–1	1–1		6–1
Universal Peace Foundation	0–4		1–4		

Updated to match(es) played on 4 Nov 2011. Source: Palau 2007 – RSSSF.com. Results not available for the last two rounds of matches.
Legend: Blue = home team win; Yellow = draw; Red = away team win.

== Knockout stage ==
Semi-finals
28 February – Koror
Surangel and Sons Company	4
Mount Everest Nepal	1
28 February – Koror
Palau Tiger Team	1
Team Bangladesh	3

Final
11 March – Koror
Team Bangladesh	2
Surangel and Sons Company	1
Third place
11 March – Koror
Mount Everest Nepal	4
Palau Tiger Team	2

=== Semi-finals ===
Both semi finals were played on 28 February 2007.

28 February 2007

Surangel and Sons Company	4–1	Mount Everest Nepal
Rehmus; Johnson; Thames; Martine	Source	Jayadi

Palau Track and Field Stadium
28 February 2007

Palau Tiger Team	1–3	Team Bangladesh
Ililau	Source	Steinmetz; Steinmetz; Uddin

Palau Track and Field Stadium

=== Third-place match ===
11 March 2007

Mount Everest Nepal	4–2	Palau Tiger Team
	Source

Palau Track and Field Stadium

=== Final ===
11 March 2007

Team Bangladesh	2–1	Surangel and Sons Company
Steinmetz; Steinmetz	Source	Johnson

Palau Track and Field Stadium

== Top scorers ==
Rank	Scorer	Club	Goals
1	(Palau) Tony Ililau	Palau Tiger Team	9
2	(United States) Andy Johnson	Surangel and Sons Company	7
3	(Palau) Steve Stefano	Palau Tiger Team	6
3	(Palau) Bradley Thames	Surangel and Sons Company	6
5	(Venezuela) Michael Steinmetz	Team Bangladesh	4
