= Surangel and Sons Company =

Association football club in Palau

Surangel and Sons Company is a company in Palau. It was founded in 1980 by Surangel Whipps in Ngerbeched, Koror.

In 2024 they sued the Island Times, a Palauan newspaper, for sharing leaked tax documents of the company.

Ksau's Motors is a division of the company.

== Football team ==
Surangel and Sons Company
- Full name: Surangel and Sons Company
- Ground: PCC Track & Field Stadium
- Capacity: 4,000
- League: Palau Soccer League

In the 2000s the company had an association football team, which first competed in the Palau Soccer League, the top-level league in Palau, in 2005, where they reached the final. In 2006, they were crowned champions. They competed in the following season as well, finishing runner up, losing 2–1 to Team Bangladesh in the final, having topped the qualifying group. Due to fragmentary records, it is not known in how many other seasons they competed.

They did not appear in the 2012 season and appeared in 2014 as Surangel Kings. In 2016 they were crowned champions for a second time, beating Kramers in the final. This is the last season of the Palau Soccer League with a known champion.
