= Baseball at the 2007 South Pacific Games =

Baseball was contested by five teams at the 2007 South Pacific Games. Palau won the gold medal, New Caledonia won the silver, American Samoa won the bronze. Fiji and Samoa were the other participating nations.

== Tournament ==
Because of bad weather conditions, the final medal rounds were cancelled, and the medal places were awarded upon round-robin results.

=== Final standings ===
Team	Win	Loss
Palau	8	0
New Caledonia	5	2
American Samoa	4	3
Fiji	2	6
Samoa	0	8

== Results ==
All five participating nations played a round-robin format.

28 August 2007	Samoa	0–13 (F/5)	Palau	Faleata Sports Complex

28 August 2007	American Samoa	28–7 (F/3)	Fiji	Faleata Sports Complex

28 August 2007	Palau	7–2	New Caledonia	Faleata Sports Complex

29 August 2007	Palau	12–2 (F/5)	Fiji	Faleata Sports Complex

29 August 2007	Fiji	2–22 (F/4)	New Caledonia	Faleata Sports Complex

29 August 2007	Samoa	0–15 (F/5)	American Samoa	Faleata Sports Complex

30 August 2007	Samoa	2–15 (F/5)	New Caledonia	Faleata Sports Complex

30 August 2007	American Samoa	5–14 (F/7)	Palau	Faleata Sports Complex

30 August 2007	Samoa	2–12 (F/6)	Fiji	Faleata Sports Complex

31 August 2007	New Caledonia	13–10	American Samoa	Faleata Sports Complex

31 August 2007	Samoa	3–14 (F/5)	Palau	Faleata Sports Complex

31 August 2007	American Samoa	14–4 (F/6)	Fiji	Faleata Sports Complex

1 September 2007	Palau	10–2 (F/7)	New Caledonia	Faleata Sports Complex

1 September 2007	New Caledonia	16–5 (F/4)	Fiji	Faleata Sports Complex

1 September 2007	Samoa	0–10	American Samoa	Faleata Sports Complex

2 September 2007	Palau	15–2 (F/5)	Fiji	Faleata Sports Complex

2 September 2007	New Caledonia	25–0 (F/5)	Samoa	Faleata Sports Complex

2 September 2007	American Samoa	1–5	Palau	Faleata Sports Complex

4 September 2007	Fiji	12–8	Samoa	Faleata Sports Complex

== See also ==
- Baseball at the South Pacific Games
- Baseball in Palau
