= Baseball in Palau =

Sport in Palau

The sport of baseball is widely played in Palau, having been introduced by the Japanese during their occupation of the island nation. The highest level of league play in Palau is represented by Palau Major League (PML), which is overseen by the Belau Baseball Federation. The country is represented in international play by the Palau national baseball team.

The PML plays its games at the Asahi Field in Koror during a season lasting from January to April. No admission fee is charged for games. As of 2002, there were seven teams in the PML in one division.

== History ==
=== 1914–1944: Japanese occupation ===
Baseball was first brought to Palau by the Japanese, who annexed the islands from Germany in 1914 and controlled them until losing the Battle of Peleliu in November 1944. One noted early promoter of baseball on the islands was Motoji Kono, who worked for the Imperial Japanese government on Palau from 1922 to 1929. He is credited with a foundational role in Palauan baseball for his work teaching Palauan men the basic skill sets and rules necessary to play the game, as well as being an energetic promoter of the sport, primarily from 1925 onwards. Most Palauan players in the 1920s were employed with the Japanese administration on the island.

In 1927 and 1928, a team of top Palauan players dubbed the All Palau Team played an annual series against a team composed of Japanese administrators. Although the Japanese won the first series, the All Palau team took 1928 match, leading the Japanese to segregate baseball on the island so that Palauans and Japanese players competed amongst themselves but not against each other.

=== 1945–1959: PML's early years ===
American soldiers who occupied Palau at the end of and following World War II further promoted the game on the island. American soldiers provided endurance training and helped develop the islanders' pitching and fielding, particularly working to cultivate their infield skills.

The PML was founded in 1947, with the league culminating in the All-Palau Baseball Championship. A team from Peleliu was dominant in the postwar years, winning seven titles between 1947 and 1957. Peleliu suffered a notable defeat in the 1955 All-Palau Baseball Championship to a team of students from Koror Intermediate School.

=== 1960–1969: first international success ===
Peleliu won three championships in the 1960s: in 1960, 1961 and 1969. The team hasn't won a PML championship since 1969. In 1962, the Airai Comets won the PML championship for the first time, defeating the Ngardmau Cardinals. In the same year, a team of Palauan all-stars secured the nation's first success in international competition, winning a three-game set against a team of Guamanian all-stars 2–0. Palau was the visiting team for the series, which was held at Chief Quipuha Park.

The team was a sensation upon its arrival in Palau, where they were hosted at the Kebtol'l Bai (double bai) in Koror. Bai is the local Palauan name for the steep-roofed shelter built as a meeting place for the village elders. Chiefs from all the clans in Palau were present for a feast held in the team's honor.

In 1963, Palau Vocational School defeated Ngardmau to become the first student team to win the All-Palau Championship since 1955. The 1963 trophy is still kept in the trophy case at Palau Community College (PCC).

A team of Palauan all-stars participated in further international competition in 1963, defeating a team from Xavier High School on Chuuk and winning a three-game series against a team of Pohnpei all-stars, two games to one. The final game narrowly avoided a rainout that would have led to a Pohnpei victory as Palau only pulled ahead in the late innings. As such, much credit for the victory was given to the Palauan team magician for overcoming the spells of the Pohnpeiian magician.

For the 1966 season, the PML contained ten teams divided into two, five team leagues. The Palau League contained Palau High School, Melekeok, Ngaremlengui, Peleliu A, and Airai. The Territorial League contained the Ngaraard Red Torch, Ngiwal, Koror, Aimeliik, and Peleliu B. However, the number and identity of the teams that participated in the PML varied significantly from year to year.

The Ngardmau Cardinals won the 1967 All Palau Baseball Championship, defeating team Asahi. The team won again in 1968, and went on to defeat a team of Palauan all-stars in the same year. The PML had seven teams in one division for the 1968 season. The competing teams were the Cardinals, Asahi, the Red Torch, Ngarametal, Ngarabelod, Ngarchelong and Peleliu. Peleliu won the 1969 championship, going 8–2 over the course of the regular season. The Palauan National Baseball Team participated in the 1969 Micronesian Olympic Games in Saipan.

=== 1970–1979: Red Torch dominate ===
There are few existing records chronicling the PML in the 1970s, but the Red Torch appear to have dominated the decade. The team won the All-Palau Baseball Championship in 1970, 1973, 1974, 1976, 1977, 1978 and 1979. Meyuns won the championship in 1971, and Palau High School won in 1972. Meyuns repeated in 1975. Asahi field also underwent a renovation at some point the 1970s that included covered bleachers.

In 1973, a lawsuit was brought by the team from Ngaremlengui against the Aimeliik team for a game that Ngaremlengui won in the bottom of the ninth that the manager of the Aimeliik team felt should have concluded in the top of the ninth due to time limitations. The Parks Board ruled in favor of Aimeliik, leading Ngaremlengui to file suit against the decision.

=== 1980–1989: rise of the Airai Aces ===
The 1981 PML season was canceled to allow the Palauan national team time to prepare for the 1981 Ambassadors Memorial baseball tournament in Guam. The tournament was played from May 22 to May 31, and in addition to the team from Palau included the Ponape All-Stars, who represented all the Federated States of Micronesia, Athletes in Action Ambassadors, the University of Guam Tritons, and the APL Los Amigos, that year's champions of the Island Baseball League in Guam. Palau's team lost in the semi-finals, with Los Amigos winning the tournament.

The Airai Aces won every championship between 1982 and 1989 save for 1986. Peleliu opted to forfeit the third game of the 1982 championship after dropping the first two games, and lost to Airai in the 1982 championship as well. Ngerbeches overcame Airai in the 1986 PML championship series, winning the set 3–2. As of 1989, there were five teams in the PML in one division.

=== 1990–1999: Aces continue to dominate ===
The Airai Aces' success continued into the 1990s, with the team taking the PML Championship outright in 1990, 1992, 1994, 1995, and 1996, and splitting the championship with Ngerbeched in 1991. Ngerbeched won the PML Finals in 1993 and 1997. A joint Ngerbeched-Ngerbeches team was the 1998 PML champion.

Palau's national team took the gold medal for baseball in the 1990 Micronesian Games in Saipan, beating Guam 8–0 in the final, and in the 1998 Games held in Palau. Palau took the bronze in baseball in the 1994 Micronesian Games. The 1999 PML season was cut short to allow Palau's athletes to train for the South Pacific Games, in which Palau finished 5th in baseball.

=== 2000–present: Koror wins first title ===
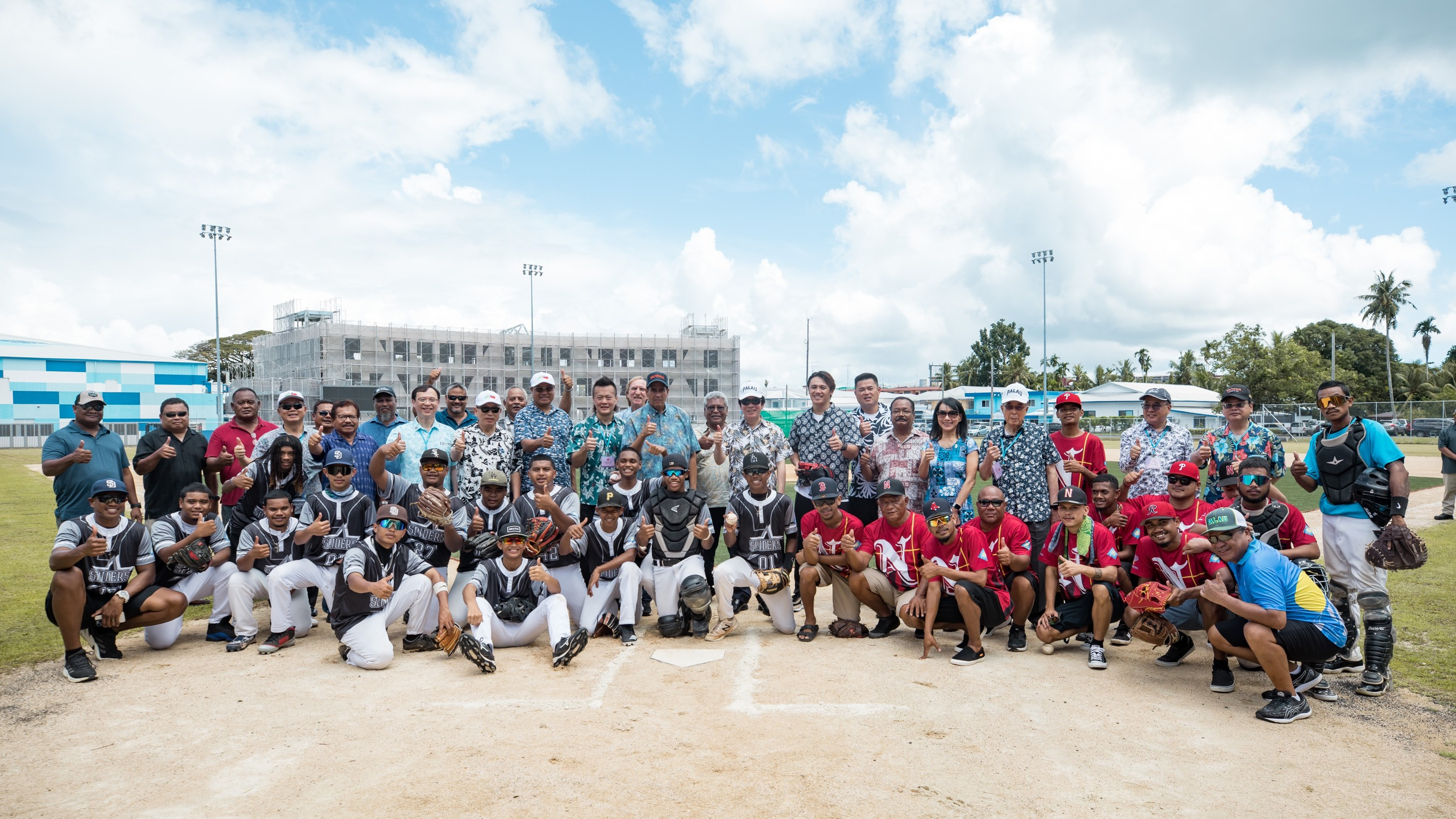
Palaun baseball players pose with President Surangel Whipps Jr. and Taiwanese Vice President Lai Ching-te at an equipment donation ceremony in Palau in November 2022

The PML had seven teams in one division for the 2000 season. Ngerbeched was the 2000 PML champion, the team's third title in a row (not including the shortened 1999 season for which no champion was announced). Ngerbeched repeated in 2001, narrowly defeating Aimeliik in the finals. Airai returned to form to take the 2002, 2003 and 2004 titles,

Koror defeated Ngerbeched to win the first PML title in the team's 60-year history in 2005. The team repeated in 2006, defeating Airai in the finals. Airai took the 2007 PML championship by defeating PCC four games to two in a seven-game championship series. Ngerbeched won the 2008 PML season.

A team of Palauan youths aged 16 to 18 years took second placed in baseball in the inaugural 2004 Oceania AAA baseball tournament, held in Palau. Palau's national team took the gold in baseball in the 2007 Pacific Games in Samoa, finishing the tournament unbeaten with an 8–0 record, though the championship game was canceled due to rain.

The national baseball team took the bronze in baseball in the 2002 and 2006 Micronesian Games. However, Palau rebounded to take the gold medal in the 2010 Micronesian Games in Palau, defeating a team from the Northern Mariana Islands 7 to 3 in the final.

In November 2022, a Taiwanese NGO donated equipment to the Palau Major League in a ceremony attended by Palaun President Surangel Whipps Jr. and Taiwanese Vice President Lai Ching-te.
