= New Caledonia national baseball team =

Information
- Country: New Caledonia
- Confederation: WBSC Oceania

WBSC ranking
- Current: NR (26 October 2026)

The New Caledonia national baseball team is the national baseball team representing New Caledonia, part of the French Republic. The team is controlled by the New Caledonia Baseball Association. The team won silver at the 2007 South Pacific Games.

== Results ==
Pacific/South Pacific Games

- 2007: (silver) second
- 2011: fourth

South Pacific Mini Games

- 2005: fourth
