= Federated States of Micronesia national baseball team =

Information
- Country: Federated States of Micronesia
- Confederation: WBSC Oceania
- Manager: Jake Scaliem

WBSC ranking
- Current: 75 ▼3 (31 December 2025)

The Federated States of Micronesia national baseball team is the national baseball team of Federated States of Micronesia (FSM). The team has competed at the South Pacific Mini Games, winning bronze in 2005. The team finished fourth out of five teams in the 2025 competition.

Jake Scaliem is the manager of the team and secretary general of the FSM Baseball & Softball Federation.

== Results ==
Pacific Mini Games

- 2005: (bronze) 3rd
- 2022: did not participate
- 2025: 4th

South Pacific Games

- 1999: (bronze) 3rd
- 2003: (bronze) 3rd
