= Triathlon at the 2025 Pacific Mini Games =

- Venue: Ngiwal State Beach Area
- Location: Imekang Beach, Ngiwal State, Palau
- Dates: 7–9 July
- Competitors: 38 from 8 nations

The triathlon competition at the 2025 Pacific Mini Games was held on July 7 to 9, at Imekang Beach in Ngiwal State, Palau. Aquathlon events were also contested and competition was held at the Palau Pacific Resort.

== Competition schedule ==
All dates use Time in Palau (UTC+9).

Event	Date	Time
Women's Individual; Men's Individual	7 July	7:30; 9:00
Mixed Relay	8 July	7:00
Aquathlon; Women's Individual; Men's Individual	9 July	7:30; 9:00

== Participating nations ==
Eight countries and territories have entered athletes for the triathlon competition.

- American Samoa (1)
- Fiji (6)
- Guam (6)
- New Caledonia (4)
- Northern Mariana Islands (6)
- Palau (6) (Host)
- Samoa (4)
- Tahiti (5)

== Medal summary ==
=== Medal table ===
* Host nation (Palau)

Rank	Nation	Gold	Silver	Bronze	Total
1	French Polynesia	5	1	2	8
2	New Caledonia	1	5	2	8
3	Fiji	0	0	1	1
3	Guam	0	0	1	1
Totals (4 entries)		6	6	6	18

=== Medalists ===
Triathlon

Event	Gold	Silver	Bronze
Men's individual	Noe Guyot (TAH)	Mathieu Szalamacha (NCL)	Timothe Erout (NCL)
Women's individual	Salome De Barthez De Marmorieres (TAH)	Melanie Hallie (NCL)	Guenaelle Rauby (TAH)
Mixed relay	Tahiti; Salome De Barthez De Marmorieres; Jean Marc Rimaud; Guenaelle Rauby; Noe Guyot	New Caledonia; Clemence Leaud; Timothe Erout; Melanie Hallie; Mathieu Szalamacha	Guam; Manami Iijima; Rynier Di Ramos; Dina Soriano; Jacob Torres

Aquathlon

Event	Gold	Silver	Bronze
Men's individual	Timothe Erout (NCL)	Noe Guyot (TAH)	Mathieu Szalamacha (NCL)
Women's individual	Salome De Barthez De Marmorieres (TAH)	Clemence Leaud (NCL)	Maidi Susset (TAH)
Mixed relay	Tahiti	New Caledonia	Fiji

== See also ==
- Triathlon at the Pacific Games
- Triathlon at the 2023 Pacific Games
