= Surangel =

Surangel is a masculine given name. Notable people with this name include:

- Surangel Whipps Jr. (born 1968), president of Palau
- Surangel S. Whipps, Palauan businessman and politician

== See also ==
- Surangel and Sons Company, Palauan football club
