= Palau national football team =

Men's association football team

Palau
- Association: Palau Football Association
- Confederation: None
- Head coach: Lukeson Sifix
- Most caps: Stephen Stefano (6)
- Top scorer: Stephen Stefano (5)
- Home stadium: PCC Track and Field Stadium
- FIFA code: PLW
First colours	Second colours

First international
- Vanuatu 6–2 Palau (Adelaide, Australia; 27 March 1987)

Biggest win
- Palau 7–1 Yap (Koror City, Palau; 27 July 1998); Palau 7–1 Pohnpei (Koror City, Palau; 28 July 1998)

Biggest defeat
- Palau 2–15 Guam (Koror City, Palau; 1 August 1998)

Micronesian Games
- Appearances: 3 (first in 1998)
- Best result: Runners-up (2014)

The Palau national football team represents Palau in international football. The team is not affiliated with FIFA or a local confederation. The team play their home games at the PCC Track and Field Stadium in the town of Koror City. As of November 2026, the side is ranked second-lowest in the world by the Elo rating system, with the country rated 243rd globally.

== History ==
Palau hosted and competed in the Micronesian Games in 1998, in which they finished third. In the tournament, teams were 9-a-side and the matches were 80 minutes in duration and were played on a pitch which was below regulation size. In addition to their first team, Palau also fielded a team consisting of Bangladeshis living on the island. They reached the final in the Micronesian Games in 2014, where the team's trip was partly covered by internet crowd funding.

== Competitive record ==
=== OFC Nations Cup ===
The Palau national football team was affiliated with OFC between 2007 and 2009. It is currently not a member of OFC.

OFC Nations Cup record
Year	Result	Position	Pld	W	D	L	GF	GA
(New Zealand) 1973	Not a member of the OFC							
(New Caledonia) 1980	Not a member of the OFC							
1996	Not a member of the OFC							
(Australia) 1998	Not a member of the OFC							
(French Polynesia) 2000	Not a member of the OFC							
(New Zealand) 2002	Not a member of the OFC							
(Australia) 2004	Not a member of the OFC							
2008	Did not enter							
(Solomon Islands) 2012	Not a member of the OFC							
(Papua New Guinea) 2016	Not a member of the OFC							
(New Zealand) 2020	Cancelled							
(Vanuatu) 2024	Not a member of the OFC							
Total		0/1	0	0	0	0	0	0

=== Micronesian Games ===
Micronesian Games record
Year	Result	Position	Pld	W	D*	L	GS	GA
(Palau) 1998	Third place	3rd	6	3	0	3	26	40
(Yap State) 2001	Did not enter							
(Pohnpei State) 2014	Runners-up	2nd	4	1	1	2	9	8
(Yap State) 2018	Third place	3rd	4	1	0	3	4	5
(Nauru) 2028	To be determined							
Total	Runners-up	3/3	14	5	1	8	39	53

== Results ==
Palau's score is shown first in each case.

No.	Date	Venue	Opponents	Score	Competition	Palau scorers	Att.	Ref.
1	27 March 1987	Adelaide City Park, Adelaide (N)	Vanuatu	2–6	Friendly	Unknown	–	
2	27 July 1998	Emmaus High School Field, Koror (H)	Yap	7–1	1998 Micronesian Games	Unknown	–	
3	28 July 1998	Emmaus High School Field, Koror (H)	Pohnpei	7–1	1998 Micronesian Games	Unknown	–	
—	30 July 1998	Emmaus High School Field, Koror (H)	Palau B	3–8	1998 Micronesian Games	Unknown	–	
4	31 July 1998	Emmaus High School Field, Koror (H)	Northern Mariana Islands	1–12	1998 Micronesian Games	Unknown	–	
5	1 August 1998	Emmaus High School Field, Koror (H)	Guam	2–15	1998 Micronesian Games	Unknown	–	
—	2 August 1998	Emmaus High School Field, Koror (H)	Palau B	6–3	1998 Micronesian Games	Stefano (5), unknown goal	–	
6	25 July 2014	PICS Field & Track, Palikir (A)	Pohnpei	1–3	2014 Micronesian Games	Mitchell	–	
7	26 July 2014	PICS Field & Track, Palikir (N)	Chuuk	5–0	2014 Micronesian Games	Bishop Jr., Miah, Nicolescu, Canseco, unknown (o.g.)	–	
8	28 July 2014	PICS Field & Track, Palikir (N)	Yap	2–2	2014 Micronesian Games	Canseco, Mitchell	–	
9	29 July 2014	PICS Field & Track, Palikir (A)	Pohnpei	1–3	2014 Micronesian Games	Mitchell	–	
10	23 July 2018	Yap Sports Complex, Gagil (N)	Pohnpei	1–2	2018 Micronesian Games	Unknown	–	
11	24 July 2018	Yap Sports Complex, Gagil (N)	Chuuk	0–1	2018 Micronesian Games		–	
12	25 July 2018	Yap Sports Complex, Gagil (A)	Yap	1–2	2018 Micronesian Games	Unknown	–	
13	26 July 2018	Yap Sports Complex, Gagil (N)	Chuuk	2–0	2018 Micronesian Games	Unknown	–	

== Last squad ==
Squad for 2014 Micronesian Games

No.	Pos.	Player	Date of birth (age)	Caps	Goals	Club
	GK	Malakai Bitu	4 February 1976 (age 50)			(Palau Football Association)
	GK	Joe Carlos	11 September 1992 (age 34)			
	GK	Penizo Remengesau				(Palau Football Association)
	DF	Youri Ito	5 March 1992 (age 34)			(Palau Football Association)
	DF	Leif Toribiong	8 April 1984 (age 42)			(Palau Football Association)
	DF	Mohoshin Miah	25 March 1973 (age 53)			(Palau Football Association)
	DF	Scott Skebong	19 August 1990 (age 36)			
	DF	Sergio Ngiraingas	19 October 1988 (age 38)			(Palau Football Association)
	DF	Joshua Remengesau				(Palau Football Association)
	MF	Charles Reklai Mitchell	31 October 1982 (age 44)	4	3	(Palau Football Association) Kramers
	MF	Robert Victor Bishop Jr.	7 October 1990 (age 36)			(Palau Football Association)
	MF	Mechesengel Roman	9 April 1994 (age 32)			(Palau Football Association)
	MF	Christian Etpison Nicolescu	19 June 1994 (age 32)			(United States Soccer Federation)
	MF	Dims Tewid	24 September 1992 (age 34)			(Japan Football Association)
	MF	McGee Mereb	25 September 1989 (age 37)			(Palau Football Association)
	MF	Jimmy Jonas	11 December 1992 (age 33)			(Palau Football Association)
	FW	Dexter Decherong	8 May 1995 (age 31)			(Palau Football Association)
	FW	Toni Illilau	31 December 1969 (age 56)			(Palau Football Association) Kramers
	FW	Paulus Ngirngesechei	9 February 1998 (age 28)			(Palau Football Association)
	FW	Mac Sasao	13 August 1992 (age 34)			(Palau Football Association)
	FW	Armando Canseco	31 July 1985 (age 41)			(Palau Football Association)
	FW	Ngirblash Tmetuchl				(Palau Football Association)

== Head-to-head record ==
Up to matches played on 23 July 2018.

Opponent	P	W	D	L	GF	GA
Chuuk	3	2	0	1	7	1
Guam	1	0	0	1	2	15
Northern Mariana Islands	1	0	0	1	1	12
Palau B	2	1	0	1	9	11
Pohnpei	4	1	0	3	10	9
Vanuatu	1	0	0	1	2	6
Yap	3	1	1	1	10	5
Total	15	5	1	9	41	59

== Notable players ==
See List of Palau international footballers.

- (Palau) Charles Reklai Mitchell - played for Cal State Northridge Matadors and Oceanian president for ConIFA between 2014 and 2017.

== Player records ==
As of 23 July 2018

Most appearances
Rank	Name	Caps	Goals	Career
1	Stephen Stefano	6	5	1998
2	Armando Canseco	4	2	2014
2	Charles Reklai Mitchell	4	3	2014
2	Christian Etpison Nicolescu	4	1	2014
2	Mohoshin Miah	4	1	2014
2	Robert Victor Bishop Jr.	4	1	2014

Top goalscorers
Rank	Name	Goals	Caps	Ratio	Career
1	Stephen Stefano	5	6	0.83	1998
2	Charles Reklai Mitchell	3	4	0.75	2014
3	Armando Canseco	2	4	0.5	2014
4	Christian Etpison Nicolescu	1	4	0.25	2014
4	Mohoshin Miah	1	4	0.25	2014
4	Robert Victor Bishop Jr.	1	4	0.25	2014

== Historical kits ==
2014-18 Home	2014-18 Away	2014-18 GK

== See also ==
- Football in Palau
- Oceania Football Confederation
