= Wrestling at the 2025 Pacific Mini Games =

- Venue: Ngarachamayong Cultural Center
- Dates: 30 June – 2 July 2025

Wrestling at the 2025 Pacific Mini Games was held at the Ngarachamayong Cultural Center, Koror, Palau from 30 June to 2 July 2025.

== Medal table ==
* Host nation (Palau)

Rank	Nation	Gold	Silver	Bronze	Total
1	Tahiti	6	4	1	11
2	Palau*	4	6	3	13
3	American Samoa	4	5	4	13
4	Marshall Islands	4	1	1	6
5	Samoa	4	1	0	5
6	Micronesia	3	2	3	8
7	Northern Mariana Islands	1	2	2	5
8	Nauru	0	1	3	4
9	Kiribati	0	1	2	3
Totals (9 entries)		26	23	19	68

== Medalists ==
=== Men's Greco-Roman ===
Event	Gold	Silver	Bronze
55 kg	Devin Celestine; Micronesia	Tyson Hedmon; Nauru	not awarded
60 kg	Yestin Uehara Narruhn; Micronesia	Shawn-Lee Tokaski; Palau	Vincent Albert Li Palacios; Northern Mariana Islands
65 kg	Seth Joshua Sablan; Northern Mariana Islands	Kane Tarkong; Palau	Aruahi Moulon; Tahiti
67 kg	Tamaterai Herve; Tahiti	Iberson Barnabas; Micronesia	Motee Maiaki; Kiribati
77 kg	Vaitehau Otcenasek; Tahiti	McCarvy Jumay Ioanis; Micronesia	not awarded
80 kg	Triven Ioanis; Micronesia	Ateanui Mati; Tahiti	Victor Stanley; American Samoa
87 kg	Shane Palemia; Samoa	Miles Samuel Coleman Borja; Northern Mariana Islands	Isaiah Agege; Nauru
87 kg	Shane Palemia; Samoa	Miles Samuel Coleman Borja; Northern Mariana Islands	John Scott William Ioanis; Micronesia
97 kg	Ekitoa Tamati; Samoa	Amo Loe; American Samoa	Filimoto Carter; Palau
110 kg	Antonio Miller; American Samoa	Vaughn Mobel; Palau	not awarded
130 kg	Zelan Falealii; American Samoa	not awarded	not awarded

=== Men's freestyle ===
Event	Gold	Silver	Bronze
60 kg	Raiden Hobson Decherong; Palau	Vincent Albert Li Palacios; Northern Mariana Islands	not awarded
65 kg	Kiabin Ronan Kennedy; Marshall Islands	Tahaki Ariitai; Tahiti	Incensio Elias; Micronesia
71 kg	Aruahi Moulon; Tahiti	Jordan Whaler Lomae; Marshall Islands	Seth Joshua Sablan; Northern Mariana Islands
74 kg	Tamaterai Herve; Tahiti	Vaitehau Otcenasek; Tahiti	Motee Maiaki; Kiribati
86 kg	Shane Palemia; Samoa	Latana Sopa; American Samoa	Isaiah Agege; Nauru
86 kg	Shane Palemia; Samoa	Latana Sopa; American Samoa	Maea Loe; American Samoa
92 kg	Idor Zytea Harris, Jr. Marshall Islands	Filimoto Carter; Palau	McGonnaphey Ioanis; Micronesia
97 kg	Ekitoa Tamati; Samoa	Amo Loe; American Samoa	Cameron Sopa; American Samoa
125 kg	Neal Hicking; Marshall Islands	Zelan Falealii; American Samoa	not awarded

=== Men's beach wrestling ===
Event	Gold	Silver	Bronze
70 kg	Tamaterai Herve; Tahiti	Motee Maiaki; Kiribati	Shawn-Lee Tokaski; Palau
80 kg	Vaitehau Otcenasek; Tahiti	Manifanur Marino; Palau	J-Boy Masters; Palau
90 kg	Latana Sopa; American Samoa	Maea Loe; American Samoa	Isaiah Agege; Nauru
+90 kg	Amo Loe; American Samoa	Ekitoa Tamati; Samoa	Zelan Falealii; American Samoa

=== Women's freestyle ===
Event	Gold	Silver	Bronze
61 kg	Hina Brel; Palau	Haulanie Neagle; Tahiti	Sydel Ma'alei Ajen; Marshall Islands
62 kg	Hina Brel; Palau	Rihanna Orrukem; Palau	not awarded
69 kg	Zyra Neimana; Marshall Islands	not awarded	not awarded

=== Women's beach wrestling ===
Event	Gold	Silver	Bronze
70 kg	Uilau Tarkong; Palau	not awarded	not awarded
