= List of Palau international footballers =

The following is a list of footballers who have represented Palau in senior international matches.

== Key ==
Positions key
GK	Goalkeeper
DF	Defender
MF	Midfielder
FW	Forward

Position
Playing positions are listed according to the player's preferred position, and not based on tactical formations that were employed at the time.
Caps and goals
Caps and goals are composed of Coupe de l'Outre-Mer matches and required qualification matches, as well as numerous international friendly tournaments and matches.

== Players ==
List is incomplete as of 23 December 2022.

Player	Birth Date	Position	Caps	Goals
Stephen Stefano			6	5
Armando Canseco			4	2
Charles Reklai Mitchell			4	3
Christian Etpison Nicolescu			4	1
Mohoshin Miah			4	1
Lamosa Sionetuato			2	0
Robert Victor Bishop Jr.			4	1
Sergio Ngiraingas			4	0
Scott Skebong				
Leif Toribiong				
Youri Ito				
Mechesengel Roman				
Paulus Ngirngesechei				
Malakai Bitu				
Toni Illilau				
Dexter Decherong				
