= Oceania Baseball Championship =

International baseball competition

- Most recent season or competition: 2007 Oceania Baseball Championship
- Sport: Baseball
- Founded: 1999
- No. of teams: 2 (in 2003)
- Continent: Oceania
- Most recent champion: Australia
- Most titles: Australia (3)

The Oceania Baseball Championship is contested between participating baseball federations in Oceania. It is sanctioned by the Baseball Confederation of Oceania (BCO).

In 2007, the New Zealand team withdrew from the tournament, giving Australia an automatic berth into the Final qualifying tournament for the 2008 Olympic Games.

== Tournament results ==
Year	Final Host	Champions	Runners-up	3rd place
1999; Details	Guam	Guam	American Samoa	–
2003; Details	Guam	Australia	Guam	–
2004; Details	Australia	Australia (Note: Guam were scheduled to participate in the 2004 tournament with Australia, but withdrew prior to the start. The BCO awarded the championship to Australia.)	–	–
2007; Details	Australia	Australia (Note: New Zealand were scheduled to participate in the 2007 tournament with Australia, but withdrew prior to the start. The BCO awarded the championship to Australia.)	–	–

== See also ==
- Oceania Softball Confederation
- Baseball at the Pacific Games
- Baseball awards § Oceania
