= Golf at the 2022 Pacific Mini Games =

- Venue: Coral Ocean Resort Golf Course
- Location: Saipan, Northern Mariana Islands
- Dates: 21–24 June
- Competitors: 61 from 11 nations

The golf competition at the 2022 Pacific Mini Games will be held from 21–24 June 2022 at the Coral Ocean Resort Golf Course in Saipan, Northern Mariana Islands.

== Participating nations ==
As of 1 June 2022, eleven countries and territories have confirmed their participation in the golf competition for the games. Each Pacific Games association is allowed to enter a maximum of eight athletes (four of each gender).

Pacific Games Associations
- American Samoa ()
- Cook Islands ()
- Fiji ()
- Guam ()
- New Caledonia ()
- Northern Mariana Islands () (Host)
- Papua New Guinea ()
- Samoa ()
- Solomon Islands ()
- Tahiti ()
- Vanuatu ()

== Medal summary ==
* Host nation (Northern Mariana Islands)

Rank	Nation	Gold	Silver	Bronze	Total
Totals (0 entries)		0	0	0	0
