= Outrigger canoeing at the 2025 Pacific Mini Games =

- Venue: Meyuns Ramp
- Location: Meyuns, Palau
- Dates: 30 June – 4 July

The outrigger canoeing competition, mostly referred to as Va'a in the Pacific region, at the 2025 Pacific Mini Games was held from 30 June – 4 July 2025 at the Meyuns Ramp in Meyuns, Palau.

== Medal summary ==
=== Medal table ===
* Host nation (Palau)

Rank	Nation	Gold	Silver	Bronze	Total
1	Tahiti	10	1	1	12
2	Fiji	1	3	5	9
3	Samoa	1	0	1	2
4	Wallis and Futuna	0	4	1	5
5	Papua New Guinea	0	3	2	5
6	Palau*	0	1	2	3
Totals (6 entries)		12	12	12	36

=== Men's results ===
Event	Gold		Silver		Bronze		Ref
V1 500 m	Temoana Taputu; Tahiti	2:15.59	Aymerick Kanimoa; Wallis and Futuna	2:20.48	Raymond Rusivakula; Fiji	2:25.30	
V6 500 m	Tahiti; Matehauarii Lacour; Tane Mu Wong; Kenny Poroi; Temoana Taputu; Chance Tavita; Ho'okipa Van Bastolaer	1:48.75	Wallis and Futuna; Stéphane Goepfert; Aymerick Kanimoa; Aaron Siakinuu; Claudio Siakinuu; Ausia Siuli; Jacky Tuakoifenua	1:51.32	Papua New Guinea; Raka Meisi; Sailor Mogala; Isaack Rava; Komu Roka; Pala Roka; Veari Veari	1:53.24	
V6 1500 m	Tahiti; Keahi Agnieray; Hiromana Flores-Nena; Aunuarii Maker; Stanley Marakai; Kenny Poroi; Temoana Taputu	7:29.99	Papua New Guinea; Raka Meisi; Sailor Mogala; Isaack Rava; Komu Roka; Pala Roka; Veari Veari	8:00.73	Wallis and Futuna; Stéphane Goepfert; Aaron Siakinuu; Claudio Siakinuu; Ausia Siuli; Luka Togiaki; Jacky Tuakoifenua	8:04.47	
V1 Marathon 16 km	Temoana Taputu; Tahiti	1:27:51	Aymerick Kanimoa; Wallis and Futuna	1:33:28	Raka Meisi; Papua New Guinea	1:39:11	
V6 Marathon 24 km	Tahiti; Keahi Agnieray; Hiromana Flores-Nena; Aunuarii Maker; Stanley Marakai; Kenny Poroi; Temoana Taputu	1:46:14.01	Wallis and Futuna; Stéphane Goepfert; Aymerick Kanimoa; Aaron Siakinuu; Claudio Siakinuu; Luka Togiaki; Jacky Tuakoifenua	1:51:19.38	Fiji; Mark Acraman; Julius Campbell; Karel Ooms; Asesela Ravudi; Raymond Rusivakula; Ifereimi Vesikula	1:53:29.75	

=== Women's results ===
Event	Gold		Silver		Bronze		Ref
V1 500 m	Anne Cairns; Samoa	2:36.29	Elenoa Vateitei; Fiji	2:38.59	Ranitea Mamatui; Tahiti	2:39.03	
V6 500 m	Tahiti; Oliana Degage; Ranitea Mamatui; Vaimiti Maoni; Mihinoa Paari; Nateahi Sommer; Heipoe Tuaira	2:11.88	Fiji; Sera Havea; Taleivini Kaimacuata; Faith Khelan; Martha Samuela; Elenoa Vateitei; Krystelle Whippy	2:13.76	Palau; Haina Mamis; Dirremeang Miah Ngiraingas; Mariah Bachoi Okada; Pkngey Otobed; Nihla Reddin; Uroi Salii	2:17.22	
V6 1500 m	Tahiti; Oliana Degage; Taihere Mairau; Vaimiti Maoni; Tenaturanui Maono; Teina Rui; Nateahi Sommer	8:50.54	Papua New Guinea; Doris Gima; Mauri Ila; Noeleen Kapi; Kone Kenny; Keke Lele; Beverlyn Valina	8:16.68	Fiji; Sera Havea; Taleivini Kaimacuata; Annette Naigulevu; Martha Samuela; Elenoa Vateitei; Krystelle Whippy	9:22.61	
V1 Marathon 16 km	Elenoa Vateitei; Fiji	1:46:06	Ranitea Mamatui; Tahiti	1:48:45	Anne Cairns; Samoa	1:48:57	
V6 Marathon 24 km	Tahiti; Oliana Degage; Taihere Mairau; Ranitea Mamatui; Vaimiti Maoni; Teina Rui; Nateahi Sommer	2:10:45.45	Fiji; Iris Fisher; Taleivini Kaimacuata; Annette Naigulevu; Martha Samuela; Elenoa Vateitei; Krystelle Whippy	2:12:54.15	Palau; Haina Mamis; Dirremeang Miah Ngiraingas; Mariah Bachoi Okada; Pkngey Otobed; Nihla Reddin; Uroi Salii	2:13:59.32	

=== Mixed ===
Event	Gold		Silver		Bronze		Ref
V6 500 m	Tahiti; Keahi Agnieray; Hiromana Flores-Nena; Taihere Mairau; Tenaturanui Maono; Stanley Marakai; Raiheva Marere	1:57.04	Palau; Javits Kiep; Jeremy Nakamura; Mariah Bachoi Okada; Anthony Ngiramur Pettit; Nihla Reddin; Uroi Salii	2:06.85	Fiji; Iris Fisher; Abraham Fong; Annette Naigulevu; Karel Ooms; Asesela Ravudi; Nikita Rouse	2:08.49	
V12 500 m	Tahiti; Keahi Agnieray; Sheyenne Avaemai; Hiromana Flores-Nena; Aunuarii Maker; Vaimiti Maoni; Raiheva Marere; Tane Mu Wong; Paipaimoana Opeta; Mihinoa Paari; Kenny Poroi; Teina Rui; Heipoe Tuaira	1:58.16	Papua New Guinea; Doris Gima; Mauri Ila; Noeleen Kapi; Kone Kenny; Keke Lele; Raka Meisi; Sailor Mogala; Isaack Rava; Komu Roka; Pala Roka; Beverlyn Valina; Veari Veari	2:00.67	Fiji; Apete Dabea; Abraham Fong; Sera Havea; Taleivini Kaimacuata; Faith Khelan; Ratu Goleanavanua Lesuma; Sanirusi Moceica; Kahela Pickering; Martha Samuela; Nanise Soko; Ifereimi Vesikula; Semesa Vilise	2:02.61	

== See also ==
- Outrigger canoeing at the 2023 Pacific Games
