= Football at the Micronesian Games =

- Organiser(s): Micronesian Games Council (Oceania National Olympic Committees)
- Current champions: Pohnpei (1st)

Football competitions were first held at the Micronesian Games for the 1998 edition of the tournament. The event is open to the ten member federations of the Micronesian Games Council, a sub-regional member of the Oceania National Olympic Committees. The football tournament has been held at two subsequent games since 1998, in 2014 and 2018. Although a similar football tournament called the Micronesian Cup was held in 1999 and 2001, they were separate events as no Micronesian Games were held in those years.

== Results by year ==
Year	Host city		Final		Third place match		
Year	Host city	Gold	Score	Silver	Bronze	Score	Fourth place
1998	(Palau); Koror City	Northern Mariana Islands	3–0	Guam	Palau	6–3	Palau B
2001	(Yap State); Gagil	Yap	0–0; 1–0	Chuuk	Pohnpei	—N/a	
2014	(Pohnpei State); Palikir	Pohnpei	3–1	Palau	Chuuk	3–1	Yap
2018	(Yap State); Gagil	Pohnpei	3–2	Yap	Palau	2–0	Chuuk

== Matches ==
=== 1998 ===
Football was played at the Micronesia Games for the first time in 1998. However, it was designed as an exhibition event that did not issue medals or count in the tournament standings. Additionally, the event was for 9-a-side teams on a field that was below regulation size with the matches being eighty minutes in length. All matches were played at the Emmaus High School Field in Koror, Palau. The Northern Mariana Islands defeated Guam in the final to become inaugural champions. Guam forward Matt Naputi was the tournament's top goal scorer with thirteen tallies.

==== Group stage ====
Pos	Team	Pld	W	D	L	GF	GA	GD	Pts
1	Guam	5	5	0	0	52	4	+48	15
2	Northern Mariana Islands	5	4	0	1	40	5	+35	12
3	Palau B	5	3	0	2	27	20	+7	9
4	Palau	5	2	0	3	20	37	−17	6
5	Yap	5	1	0	4	8	39	−31	3
6	Pohnpei	5	0	0	5	9	51	−42	0

Source: https://www.rsssf.org/tablesm/micronesia98.html

27 July Round 1	Northern Mariana Islands	8–0	Palau "B"
		Report

27 July Round 1	Palau	7–1	Yap
		Report

27 July Round 1	Guam	16–1	Pohnpei
		Report

28 July Round 2	Guam	4–0	Palau "B"
	Toby Irish 22'; Danny Palomo 26'; Solo Siewart 29'; Matt Naputi 60'	Report

28 July Round 2	Northern Mariana Islands	8–0	Yap
		Report

28 July Round 2	Palau	7–1	Pohnpei
		Report

30 July Round 3	Guam	2–1	Northern Mariana Islands
		Report

30 July Round 3	Palau "B"	8–3	Palau
		Report

30 July Round 3	Yap	4–3	Pohnpei
		Report

31 July Round 4	Guam	15–0	Yap
		Report

31 July Round 4	Northern Mariana Islands	12–1	Palau
		Report

31 July Round 4	Palau "B"	13–2	Pohnpei
		Report

1 August Round 5	Guam	15–2	Palau
		Report

1 August Round 5	Palau "B"	6–3	Yap
		Report

1 August Round 5	Northern Mariana Islands	11–2	Pohnpei
		Report

==== Finals ====
3 August Fifth Place match	Yap	v (5–4 p)	Pohnpei
		Report

3 August Third Place match	Palau	6–3	Palau "B"
	Stephen Stefano,,,,	Report

3 August Final	Northern Mariana Islands	3–0	Guam
	Charles Kewo 5'; Chris Leon Guerrero 15' (??)	Report

=== 2014 ===
Four teams competed in the 2014 tournament. After initially intending to play, Kiribati withdrew from the tournament while Guam did not enter. The Northern Mariana Islands could not enter because of a schedule conflict with 2015 EAFF East Asian Cup qualification. All matches took place at PICS Field in Palikir, Pohnpei, Federated States of Micronesia.

==== Group stage ====
Pos	Team	Pld	W	D	L	GF	GA	GD	Pts
1	Pohnpei	3	3	0	0	10	3	+7	9
2	Palau	3	1	1	1	8	5	+3	4
3	Yap	3	1	1	1	5	8	−3	4
4	Chuuk	3	0	0	3	4	11	−7	0
5	Kiribati	0	0	0	0	0	0	0	0

Source: https://www.rsssf.org/tablesm/micronesia2014.html

25 July Round 1	Pohnpei (Pohnpei State)	3–1	Palau
	Percy Rasug; Alex Panuelo; Yafeth Konings	Report	Charles Reklai Mitchell

25 July Round 1	Chuuk (Chuuk State)	2–3	(Yap State) Yap
	Curtis Graham; Gilbert Kin	Report	???,,

26 July Round 2	Palau	5–0	(Chuuk State) Chuuk
	Robert Bishop; Mohosin Miah; Cristian Nicolescu; Armando Canseco; (o.g.)	Report

26 July Round 2	Pohnpei (Pohnpei State)	4–0	(Yap State) Yap
	Yafeth Konings, Paul Cantero; Bob Paul	Report

28 July Round 3	Pohnpei (Pohnpei State)	3–2	(Chuuk State) Chuuk
	Percy Rasug; Alex Panuelo; Jair Konings	Report	Iopy Rudolph; Texter Rain

28 July Round 3	Palau	2–2	(Yap State) Yap
	Armando Canseco; Charles Reklai Mitchell	Report	Aaron Bayon; Jacob Nam

==== Finals ====
29 July Third Place match	Yap (Yap State)	1–3	(Chuuk State) Chuuk
	Devon Figirman	Report	Scott Rudolph, Iopy Rudolph

29 July Championship match	Pohnpei (Pohnpei State)	3–1	Palau
	Percy Rasug; Roger Nakasone; Alex Panuelo	Report	Charles Reklai Mitchell

=== 2018 ===
Three states of the Federated States of Micronesia (Chuuk, Pohnpei, and Yap) entered the tournament individually. Kosrae, Nauru, Kiribati, Northern Mariana Islands, the Marshall Islands, and Guam did not enter the football tournament despite competing in other events at the games. All matches were played at the Yap Sports Complex in Gagil, Yap, Federated States of Micronesia.

==== Group stage ====
Pos	Team	Pld	W	D	L	GF	GA	GD	Pts
1	Yap	3	2	1	0	8	5	+3	7
2	Pohnpei	3	1	2	0	5	4	+1	5
3	Chuuk	3	1	1	1	4	5	−1	4
4	Palau	3	0	0	3	2	5	−3	0

Source: https://www.rsssf.org/tablesm/micronesia2018.html

23 July Round 1	Pohnpei (Pohnpei State)	2–1	Palau
		Report

23 July Round 1	Yap (Yap State)	4–2	(Chuuk State) Chuuk
		Report

24 July Round 2	Chuuk (Chuuk State)	1–0	Palau
		Report

24 July Round 2	Pohnpei (Pohnpei State)	2–2	(Yap State) Yap
		Report

25 July Round 3	Chuuk (Chuuk State)	1–1	(Pohnpei State) Pohnpei
		Report

25 July Round 3	Yap (Yap State)	2–1	Palau
		Report

==== Finals ====
25 July Third Place match	Palau	2–0	(Chuuk State) Chuuk
		Report

27 July Championship match	Yap (Yap State)	2–3	(Pohnpei State) Pohnpei
		Report
