= 2006 Palau Soccer League =

Palau Soccer League
- Season: 2006
- Champions: Surangel and Sons Company

The 2006 season of the Palau Soccer League was the third season of association football competition in Palau. Surangel and Sons Company won the championship, their first title. They played Team Bangladesh in the final.
