= Triathlon at the 2022 Pacific Mini Games =

- Venue: West Marine Harbor, and Round House
- Location: Rota, Northern Mariana Islands
- Dates: 20, and 22 June
- Competitors: 35 from 7 nations

The triathlon competition at the 2022 Pacific Mini Games will be held on June 20 and 22, at the West Marine Harbor, and Round House in Rota, Northern Mariana Islands.

== Participating nations ==
As of 1 June 2022, seven countries and territories have confirmed their participation for triathlon at the games.

Pacific Games Associations
- Fiji ()
- Guam ()
- New Caledonia ()
- Northern Mariana Islands () (Host)
- Palau ()
- Solomon Islands ()
- Tahiti ()

== Medal summary ==
=== Medal table ===
* Host nation (Northern Mariana Islands)

Rank	Nation	Gold	Silver	Bronze	Total
Totals (0 entries)		0	0	0	0

=== Medalists ===
Event	Gold	Silver	Bronze
Men's triathlon Individual			
Women's triathlon Individual			
Men's aquathlon Individual			
Women's aquathlon Individual			
Mixed triathlon relay Team			
