= Outrigger canoeing at the 2022 Pacific Mini Games =

- Venue: 13th Fishermen Memorial Monument Beach
- Location: Saipan, Northern Mariana Islands
- Dates: 20–24 June
- Competitors: 182 from 11 nations

The outrigger canoeing competition, mostly referred to as Va'a in the Pacific region, at the 2022 Pacific Mini Games will be held from 20–24 June 2022 at the 13th Fishermen Memorial Monument Beach in Saipan, Northern Mariana Islands.

== Participating nations ==
As of 1 June 2022, eleven countries and territories have confirmed their participation in va'a (outrigger canoeing) for the games.

Pacific Games Associations
- Cook Islands ()
- Fiji ()
- Guam ()
- New Caledonia ()
- Norfolk Island ()
- Northern Mariana Islands () (Host)
- Palau ()
- Papua New Guinea ()
- Solomon Islands ()
- Tahiti ()
- Wallis and Futuna ()

== Medal summary ==
=== Medal table ===
* Host nation (Northern Mariana Islands)

Rank	Nation	Gold	Silver	Bronze	Total
Totals (0 entries)		0	0	0	0

=== Men's results ===
Event	Gold	Silver	Bronze	Ref
V1 500 m	Albert Mainquet (NCL)			
V6 500 m				
V6 1500 m				
V12 500 m				
V1 15 km (time= h:min:s)	Tehaamana Bernadino (TAH)			
V6 30 km (time= h:min:s)				

=== Women's results ===
Event	Gold	Silver	Bronze	Ref
V1 500 m	Hinatea Bernadino (TAH)			
V6 500 m				
V6 1500 m				
V12 500 m				
V1 15 km (time= h:min:s)	Vaimiti Maoni (TAH)			
V6 30 km (time= h:min:s)				
