= Judo at the 2025 Pacific Mini Games =

Judo competition

Judo Judo at the 2025 Pacific Mini Games
- Venue: Meyuns Sports Complex
- Location: Ngerulmud, Palau
- Dates: 7–8 July
- Competitors: 56 from 8 nations
- Website: Official website

Competition at external databases
- Links: IJF • JudoInside

Judo competitions at the 2025 Pacific Mini Games in Palau took place on 7 and 8 July at Meyuns Sports Complex in Meyuns.

== Participating nations ==
Eight countries and territories entered judokas for the tournament.

- Australia (6)
- French Polynesia (14)
- Guam (4)
- Kiribati (7)
- Nauru (8)
- Palau (9) (Host)
- Tokelau (1)
- Vanuatu (7)

== Medal summary ==
A total of 17 medal events (8 per gender and 1 mixed event) were scheduled for the judo tournament. However, only one event (women's half-heavyweight) was not contested due to a lack of combatants.

=== Medal table ===
* Host nation (Palau)

| Rank | Nation | Gold | Silver | Bronze | Total |
|---|---|---|---|---|---|
| 1 | French Polynesia (TAH) | 12 | 4 | 4 | 20 |
| 2 | Vanuatu (VAN) | 2 | 1 | 2 | 5 |
| 3 | Australia (AUS) | 1 | 4 | 2 | 7 |
| 4 | Kiribati (KIR) | 1 | 0 | 0 | 1 |
| 5 | Nauru (NRU) | 0 | 2 | 3 | 5 |
| 6 | Guam (GUM) | 0 | 1 | 1 | 2 |
| 7 | Palau (PLW)* | 0 | 0 | 2 | 2 |
| 8 | Tokelau (TKL) | 0 | 0 | 1 | 1 |
| Totals (8 entries) | | 16 | 12 | 15 | 43 |

=== Men's events ===
| Event | Gold | Silver | Bronze |
|---|---|---|---|
| Extra-lightweight (60 kg) | Tebania Mwemwenikeaki; Kiribati | Lukas Chene; French Polynesia | Alan Monthouel; Vanuatu |
| Extra-lightweight (60 kg) | Tebania Mwemwenikeaki; Kiribati | Lukas Chene; French Polynesia | Rahiti Reia; French Polynesia |
| Half-lightweight (66 kg) | Noah Asman; Australia | Tamaterai Herve; French Polynesia | Daraidun Canon; Nauru |
| Half-lightweight (66 kg) | Noah Asman; Australia | Tamaterai Herve; French Polynesia | Kyle Nunez; Guam |
| Lightweight (73 kg) | Kerian Vasapolli; French Polynesia | Manatoa Luciani; French Polynesia | Isamaela Solomon; Nauru |
| Lightweight (73 kg) | Kerian Vasapolli; French Polynesia | Manatoa Luciani; French Polynesia | Hamray Temaki; Nauru |
| Half-middleweight (81 kg) | Toanui Lucas; French Polynesia | Winchester Munuake; Nauru | Alonzo Sumor; Palau |
| Half-middleweight (81 kg) | Toanui Lucas; French Polynesia | Winchester Munuake; Nauru | —N/a |
| Middleweight (90 kg) | Evan Jolif; French Polynesia | Harrison Tomlin; Australia | Ilai Ualehi Manu; Tokelau |
| Middleweight (90 kg) | Evan Jolif; French Polynesia | Harrison Tomlin; Australia | —N/a |
| Half-heavyweight (100 kg) | Cyril Gaudemer; French Polynesia | | —N/a |
| Half-heavyweight (100 kg) | Cyril Gaudemer; French Polynesia | | —N/a |
| Heavyweight (+100 kg) | Ra Imaru Holozet; French Polynesia | | —N/a |
| Heavyweight (+100 kg) | Ra Imaru Holozet; French Polynesia | | —N/a |
| Open | Cyril Gaudemer; French Polynesia | Jake Bell; Australia | Toanui Lucas; French Polynesia |
| Open | Cyril Gaudemer; French Polynesia | Jake Bell; Australia | Ra Imaru Holozet; French Polynesia |

=== Women's events ===
| Event | Gold | Silver | Bronze |
|---|---|---|---|
| Extra-lightweight (48 kg) | Ambre Popoff; French Polynesia | Anna Bumseng; Vanuatu | —N/a |
| Extra-lightweight (48 kg) | Ambre Popoff; French Polynesia | Anna Bumseng; Vanuatu | —N/a |
| Half-lightweight (52 kg) | Prisicillia Monthouel; Vanuatu | Sama Taleka; Nauru | —N/a |
| Half-lightweight (52 kg) | Prisicillia Monthouel; Vanuatu | Sama Taleka; Nauru | —N/a |
| Lightweight (57 kg) | Kaina Delrieu; Vanuatu | | —N/a |
| Lightweight (57 kg) | Kaina Delrieu; Vanuatu | | —N/a |
| Half-middleweight (63 kg) | Teraimatuatini Bopp; French Polynesia | Hailee Webber; Guam | Anoah Mesebeluu; Palau |
| Half-middleweight (63 kg) | Teraimatuatini Bopp; French Polynesia | Hailee Webber; Guam | —N/a |
| Middleweight (70 kg) | Haukea Vitielli; French Polynesia | Taylah Hayes; Australia | Keheilani Amaru-Tekehu; French Polynesia |
| Middleweight (70 kg) | Haukea Vitielli; French Polynesia | Taylah Hayes; Australia | —N/a |
| Half-heavyweight (78 kg) | Not contested, only one entry | | |
| Heavyweight (+78 kg) | Teipoteani Tevenino; French Polynesia | | —N/a |
| Heavyweight (+78 kg) | Teipoteani Tevenino; French Polynesia | | —N/a |
| Open | Teraimatuatini Bopp; French Polynesia | Teipoteani Tevenino; French Polynesia | Charlize Breen; Australia |
| Open | Teraimatuatini Bopp; French Polynesia | Teipoteani Tevenino; French Polynesia | Taylah Hayes; Australia |

=== Mixed team ===
| Event | Gold | Silver | Bronze |
|---|---|---|---|
| Mixed team | French Polynesia (PYF); Kerian Vasapolli; Cyril Gaudemer; Toanui Lucas; Ambre Popoff; Teipoteani Tevenino; Teraimatuatini Bopp | Australia (AUS); Taylah Hayes; Jake Bell; Obian Laidlaw; Harrison Tomlin; Charlize Breen | Vanuatu (VAN); Alan Monthouel; Knox Valia; Prisicillia Monthouel; Kaina Delrieu; Veronica Tari |

== See also ==
- Judo at the 2023 Pacific Games
