= 2025 Pacific Mini Games =

Multi-sport event in Palau

XII Pacific Mini Games
- Host city: Koror
- Country: Palau
- Motto: Empowering Unity
- Nations: 23
- Athletes: ~2000
- Events: 12 sports
- Opening: June 29, 2025
- Closing: July 9, 2025
- Opened by: Surangel Whipps Jr. President of Palau
- Torch lighter: Sydney Francisco
- Main venue: National Stadium
- Website: www.palau2025pmg.com

The 2025 Pacific Mini Games, officially known as the XII Pacific Mini Games and also known as Palau 2025, was a scaled-down multi-sport event of the Pacific Games as well as the twelfth edition of the Pacific Mini Games which were held from 29 June to 9 July 2025, in Koror, Palau. The country had previously hosted the 2005 edition making these Games the second to be held in Palau.

For the first time, Tahiti topped the medal table by both total golds (72) and total medals (142). Fiji and Samoa finished second and third respectively with 27 gold medals each. Australia followed up in fourth, setting a record for the most gold medals and total medals ever won by their delegation at a Pacific Mini Games with 24 golds and 55 medals in total. Papua New Guinea rounded off the top five list with 22 gold medals and third in the overall medal count with 77. Host nation Palau won 29 medals including 5 golds, their best result in terms of total medals won at any Pacific Mini Games, finishing in ninth place.

== Host selection ==
Palau was awarded hosting rights for the Games following a delayed bid process by the Pacific Games Council (PGC). Initially, American Samoa and Niue submitted bids but failed to meet the necessary requirements, notably lacking the mandatory government guarantees needed to financially underwrite the Games. In a subsequent bidding round, only American Samoa and Palau participated, with Palau’s bid being endorsed by the PGC and American Samoa’s bid again ruled non-compliant.

2025 Pacific Mini Games bidding results
City	PGA	Votes
Koror	Palau	16
Pago Pago	American Samoa	5

== Venues and infrastructure ==
The Games venues are spread across four settlements (two cities, two towns) located in four of the sixteen states of Palau.

Competition venues
City/town	Venue	Events
Koror	National Stadium	Athletics
Koror	Nippon Stadium	Baseball
Koror	Spiders Gym (Palau High School)	Basketball 3x3
Koror	Ngermalk Park	Beach volleyball
Koror	Long Island Park	Beach volleyball
Koror	Ngarachamayong Cultural Center	Table tennis
Koror	Ngarachamayong Cultural Center	Wrestling
Koror	National Gymnasium	Volleyball
Meyuns	Meyuns Multi-purpose Gymnasium	Judo
Meyuns	Meyuns Multi-purpose Gymnasium	Weightlifting
Meyuns	Meyuns Ramp	Outrigger canoeing
Meyuns	Meyuns Softball Field	Softball
Meyuns	National Swimming Pool	Swimming
Airai	Japan-Palau Friendship Bridge Airai Side	Beach wrestling
Melekeok	Melekeok Baseball Field	Archery
—N/a	Imekang to Ngiwal State	Triathlon

== Sports ==
The following sports are expected to be contested at the 2025 Pacific Mini Games:

- Archery (9)
- Athletics (52)
- Baseball
  - Baseball (1)
  - Softball (1)
- Basketball 3x3 (2)
- Judo (16)
- Outrigger canoeing (12)
- Swimming (47)
- Table tennis (11)
- Triathlon (5)
- Volleyball
  - Volleyball (2)
  - Beach volleyball (2)
- Weightlifting (48)
- Wrestling (26)
Note: Numbers in parentheses indicate the number of events in each sport.

== Participating countries ==
21 out of the 22 Pacific Games Associations were represented at the 2025 Mini Games with only Niue absent. Australia and New Zealand were invited to compete for the third time.

- American Samoa
- Australia
- Cook Islands (18)
- Federated States of Micronesia
- Fiji (136)
- Guam
- Kiribati
- Marshall Islands
- Nauru
- New Caledonia
- New Zealand (9)
- Norfolk Island
- Northern Mariana Islands
- Palau (Host)
- Papua New Guinea
- Samoa
- Solomon Islands
- Tahiti
- Tokelau
- Tonga
- Tuvalu
- Vanuatu
- Wallis and Futuna
Note: Numbers in parentheses indicate the number of athletes.

== Calendar ==
In the following calendar for the 2025 Mini Games, each blue box represents an event competition, such as a qualification round, on that day. The yellow boxes represent days during which medal-awarding finals for a sport were held. On the left, the calendar lists each sport with events held during the Games, and at the right how many gold medals were won in that sport. There is a key at the top of the calendar to aid the reader.

All dates are in Palauan Time (GMT+9)

OC	Opening ceremony	●	Event competitions	1	Gold medal events	CC	Closing ceremony

June/July 2025		June		July									Events
June/July 2025		29 Sun	30 Mon	1 Tue	2 Wed	3 Thu	4 Fri	5 Sat	6 Sun	7 Mon	8 Tue	9 Wed	Events
Ceremonies		OC										CC	
Archery				4	●	5							9
Athletics							11	10		15	14	2	52
Baseball	Baseball		●	●	●	●	●	●		1			1
Baseball	Softball		●	●	●	●	●	●		●	1		1
Basketball 3x3				●	●	●		●		●	●	2	2
Judo										7	9		16
Outrigger canoeing			3	3	4		2						12
Swimming			10	8	9	7	10	3					47
Table tennis					4	3	4						11
Triathlon										2	1	3	6
Volleyball	Indoor volleyball		●	●	●	●	●	●		●	2		2
Volleyball	Beach volleyball				●	●	●	●		●	2		2
Weightlifting					15	12	15	6					48
Wrestling			6	14	4								24
Total events			19	29	36	27	42	19		25	29	7	235
Cumulative total			19	48	84	109	151	172		197	228	235	235
June/July		29 Sun	30 Mon	1 Tue	2 Wed	3 Thu	4 Fri	5 Sat	6 Sun	7 Mon	8 Tue	9 Wed	Events

== Medal table ==
* Host nation (Palau)

Rank	Nation	Gold	Silver	Bronze	Total
1	Tahiti	72	41	29	142
2	Fiji	27	30	24	81
3	Samoa	27	14	20	61
4	Australia	24	16	15	55
5	Papua New Guinea	22	29	26	77
6	Northern Mariana Islands	10	8	13	31
7	New Caledonia	7	11	16	34
8	American Samoa	6	5	4	15
9	Palau*	5	7	17	29
10	Marshall Islands	5	1	6	12
11	Guam	4	9	7	20
12	Wallis and Futuna	4	5	4	13
13	Cook Islands	4	3	6	13
14	Kiribati	4	1	3	8
15	Nauru	3	24	11	38
16	Tonga	3	7	6	16
17	Vanuatu	3	7	5	15
18	Micronesia	3	2	3	8
19	New Zealand	2	3	4	9
20	Solomon Islands	1	5	3	9
21	Tuvalu	0	0	2	2
22	Tokelau	0	0	1	1
Totals (22 entries)		236	228	225	689

Updated after final day of competition (9 July 2025).

=== Basketball ===
Event	Gold	Silver	Bronze
Men's 3×3	Fiji; Keenan Hughes; Isaac Sewabu; Ratu Gabriel Tuivanuavou; Tevita Vocea	Solomon Islands; Bart Kirby Basia; Kalita Paul Maelasi; Elijah Nunafana Otasui; Kenneth Junior Ramo	Palau; Westin Andrew; Rodrick Faustino; Jerry Ngiraremiang
Women's 3×3	Fiji; Estelle Kainamoli; Ranadi Koroi; Moana Liebregts; Camari Ravai	Tonga; Ana-Rachel Enari; Makeili Ika; Lesieli Kololia Litia Manupule; Lineni Uaine	Northern Mariana Islands; Alliyah Faye Apone Fernandez; Kina Neisuupi Pua Rangamar; Kaia De Jesus Travilla; Yasmeen Zahara Torres Younis

=== Para table tennis ===
Event	Class	Gold	Silver	Bronze
Men's singles	Ambulant	Rodney Satini; Solomon Islands	Haoda Agari; Papua New Guinea	Teva Bu Luc; Tahiti
Men's singles	Wheelchair	Vincent Tehei; Tahiti	Luani Moeakiola; Tonga	not awarded
Women's singles	Wheelchair	Merewalesi Roden; Fiji	Akanisi Latu; Fiji	not awarded
Men's team		Tahiti; Teva Bu Luc; Vincent Tehei	not awarded	not awarded
Women's team		Fiji; Akanisi Latu; Merewalesi Roden	not awarded	not awarded

=== Table tennis ===
Event	Gold	Silver	Bronze
Men's singles	Jérôme Morisseau; New Caledonia	Ariinui Pambrun; Tahiti	Keanu Decian; Tahiti
Women's singles	Kelley Tehahetua; Tahiti	Keala Tehahetua; Tahiti	Temehau Tere; Tahiti
Men's doubles	Tahiti; Ariinui Pambrun; Dylan Vongue	Tahiti; Keanu Decian; Kevin Decian	Papua New Guinea; David Loi; Geoffrey Loi
Women's doubles	Tahiti; Kelley Tehahetua; Keala Tehahetua	Vanuatu; Anolyn Flyn Lulu; Tracey Mawa	Palau; Meilin Chin; Dengelei Hazel Lukas
Mixed doubles	Tahiti; Keanu Decian; Kelley Tehahetua	Vanuatu; Anolyn Flyn Lulu; Yoshua Jordan Shing	Tahiti; Ariinui Pambrun; Clara Sayegh
Men's team	Tahiti; Keanu Decian; Kevin Decian; Ariinui Pambrun; Dylan Vongue	New Caledonia; Jérôme Morisseau; Matisse Pindon; Raphaël Quinne	Papua New Guinea; Guba Hila; David Loi; Geoffrey Loi; Hereva Richard
Women's team	Tahiti; Clara Sayegh; Kelley Tehahetua; Keala Tehahetua; Temehau Tere	Papua New Guinea; Tammi Agari; Maryanne Hane; Nancy Noho; Emily Winnie	Vanuatu; Marieson Kelly Bue; Anolyn Flyn Lulu; Tracey Mawa

=== Volleyball ===
Event	Gold	Silver	Bronze
Men's indoor	Wallis and Futuna; Pierre Halagahu; Jean Marc Kalato; Ainsley Polutele; Ludovic Siselo; Winsley Siselo; Gabyclay Tafilagi; Boris Takaniko; Jolan Toluafe; Glenn Tuifua; Anylson Tuisamoa; Daniel Vaikuamoho	Papua New Guinea; Junior Edward; Leo Aisi; David John; Elison Bobby; Rolley Forova; Junior Harold; Ula Numa; Gerard Oki; Ramon Oki; Victor Pala; Ila Wally; Simon Tua	Tahiti; Christophe Ariitai; Miky Foster; Terooarii Foster; Keitagi Labaste; Ariihau Marahiti; Alex Mohi-Teupoohuitua; Vairua Nanuaiterai; Tanaroa Teinauri; Joshua Tekohuotetua; Metiari Temauri; Hoani Teriihopuare
Women's indoor	American Samoa; Kailani Leaiseaiga Afatia; Janet Jewell Iacinta Filemoni; V Aranauh Liufau; Titiula Ilaila Manuma; Tupu Pa'au; Heiress Palepoi; Kamerynn Tali-Maria Reid; Keonahi'ilani Noridalaufasa Solaita; Nadene La'ala'ai Ta'ase; Lomialagi Sina Ta'atiti; Malinah Niumoana Telefoni	Tahiti; Kumuhei Ateo; Hanalei Pecheret; Natura Rey; Vaiarava Rochette; Tahiaohotini Tata; Kawelani Tauraa; Ranihei Tauraatua; Kayla Tavaearii; Naimi Tokoragi; Moehana Touaitahuata; Vaiteani Vaki	Wallis and Futuna; Martinaya Dornic; Moana Fitialeata; Louisa Fuahea; Lyze Hnalaine; Leilana Likuvalu; Malia Kalemeli Mailehako; Ana Momoli-Kilagi Nau; Fetuuaho Selui ép. Liufau; Manaika Taofifenua; Keona Tuia; Leyla Tuifua ép. Kavakava
Men's beach	Australia; Finley Bennett; Jed Walker	Northern Mariana Islands; Andrew Scott Johnson; Logan Jon Mister	Fiji; Wilisoni Loga; Sakiusa Naivana
Women's beach	Vanuatu; Majabelle Lawac; Sherysyn Toko	Australia; Kayla Louise Mears; Jasmine Rayner	Guam; Austia Mendiola; Kristen Serrano
