= Charles Reklai Mitchell =

Palauan footballer

Personal information
- Date of birth: 31 October 1982 (age 43)
- Place of birth: Escondido, San Diego
- Height: 1.75 m (5 ft 9 in)
- Positions: Midfielder; forward

College career
Years	Team	Apps	(Gls)
2000–2003	Cal State Northridge Matadors		

Senior career*
Years	Team	Apps	(Gls)
- Kramers

International career^{‡}
2014	Palau	4	(3)

Managerial career
- 2008–: Palau Football Association
- 2014–2017: CONIFA (Oceania president)
- * Club domestic league appearances and goals as of August 2026 ‡ National team caps and goals as of August 2026

Charles Reklai Mitchell (born 31 October 1982) is a Palauan-American footballer who played for the Palau national football team, whom he is the topscorer. (Note: All 5 of Steven Stephano's goals came against Palau's "B" team)

== Career ==
Mitchell started his career playing for Cal State, where he would spend 3 years before departing the team. He would move to Koror in 2007, and was influential in developing the local scene, joining the Palau Football Association in 2008 and applying to the East Asian Football Federation that same year. He was behind Palau's crowdfunding scheme to cover their travel to the 2014 Micronesian Games in Pohnpei, where he used GoFundMe to raise $3,275, which allowed the Palauan side to participate in the competition. Mitchell himself would play in the tournament, providing Palau's goalscoring threat, finishing as the tournament's joint top scorer with 3 goals, guiding his team to the final both as a player and as an administrator.
