= New Caledonia Baseball Association =

New Caledonia Baseball Association is the governing body of the sport of baseball within New Caledonia. The current president of the association is Jean DeSittier.
