= 2005 Palau Soccer League =

Palau Soccer League
- Season: 2005
- Champions: Team Bangladesh

The 2005 season of the Palau Soccer League was the second season of association football competition in Palau. Team Bangladesh won the championship, their first title. They played Surangel and Sons Company in the final.
