= Baseball at the 2022 Pacific Mini Games =

- Venue: Oleai Sports Complex - Francisco “Tan Ko” M. Palacios Baseball Field
- Location: Saipan, Northern Mariana Islands
- Dates: 16–24 June
- Competitors: 96 from 5 nations

Baseball made its second Pacific Mini Games appearance at the 2022 Pacific Mini Games on June 16-24 at the Oleai Sports Complex - Francisco “Tan Ko” M. Palacios Baseball Field in Saipan, Northern Mariana Islands. The Northern Mariana Islands team won the gold medal, defeating Guam by 12–9 in the final.

== Participating nations ==
As of 1 June 2022, five countries and territories have confirmed their participation in baseball for the games.

Pacific Games Associations
- Fiji (20)
- Guam (20)
- Northern Mariana Islands (20) (Host)
- Palau (20)
- Solomon Islands (20)

== Medal summary ==
* Host nation (Northern Mariana Islands)

Rank	Nation	Gold	Silver	Bronze	Total
1	Northern Mariana Islands*	1	0	0	1
2	Guam	0	1	0	1
3	Palau	0	0	1	1
Totals (3 entries)		1	1	1	3

== Medalists ==
Event	Gold	Silver	Bronze
Men's tournament	Northern Mariana Islands; Lamarc Iguel; Juan Iguel; Benjamin Mendiola Jones Jr; John Peter Camacho Sablan; Shane Yamada; Anthony Tenorio; Keoni Lizama; Darion David Jones; Joshua John Jones; Benjamin Jones Jr. Lorenzo Lee Sebaklim; Tyrone Omar; Patrick John Alepuyo; Aldebert Delos Santos Lizama; Nokki Saralu; Diego Joaquin Camacho; Franko Nakamura; Jerald Jerome Cabrera; Dennis Cabrera; Joaquin Jacob Babauta Jr. Byron Kaipat	Guam	Palau
