= 2004 Palau Soccer League =

Palau Soccer League
- Season: 2004
- Champions: Daewoo Ngatpang
- Relegated: None
- Matches: 7
- Goals: 25 (3.57 per match)
- Top goalscorer: Tony Ililau, 4
- Biggest home win: Mount Everest Nepal 4–2 Palau Track and Field Team; Team Bangladesh 2–0 Mount Everest Nepal
- Biggest away win: Team Bangladesh 2–3 Palau Track and Field Team
- Highest scoring: Mount Everest Nepal 4–2 Palau Track and Field Team

The 2004 Palau Soccer League was the first season of association football competition in Palau. The league was won by Daewoo Ngatpang The league consisted of three rounds of matches, a play-off final and was named the Palau Soccer Association Local League.

== Teams ==
Four teams competed in this inaugural season of the Palau Soccer League. All matches were played at the PCC Track & Field Stadium in Koror, home stadium to all the teams. This was due to the lack of suitable venues for soccer matches in Palau. The teams for 2004 (listed in alphabetical order) were:

- Daewoo Ngatpang FC
- Mount Everest Nepal FC
- Palau Track and Field Team FC
- Team Bangladesh FC

The location of the PCC Track & Field Stadium, where all games took place:

Koror
PCC Track & Field Stadium
7°20′N 134°28′E
Capacity: 4,000

== League stage ==
=== Standings ===
Pos	Team	Pld	W	D	L	GF	GA	GD	Pts	Qualification
1	Daewoo Ngatpang (A)	3	2	1	0	6	4	+2	7	Qualification for Final
2	Mount Everest Nepal (A)	3	1	1	1	5	5	0	4	Qualification for Final
3	Palau Track and Field Team	3	1	0	2	6	8	−2	3	
4	Team Bangladesh	3	1	0	2	6	8	−2	3	

Updated to match(es) played on 18 Apr 2007. Source: rsssf.com
Rules for classification: 1) points; 2) goal difference; 3) number of goals scored.
(A) Advance to a further round

=== Results ===
The 2004 season was played in two stages: the first stage was a group in which all teams played each other once. The top two teams then qualified for a one legged final to determine the overall champion.

==== Week 1 ====
28 November 2004

Daewoo Ngatpang	3–2	Team Bangladesh
Unknown	Source	Unknown

Palau Track and Field Stadium
28 November 2004

Mount Everest Nepal	4–2	Palau Track and Field Team
Unknown	Source	Ililau; Ililau

Palau Track and Field Stadium

==== Week 2 ====
5 December 2004

Daewoo Ngatpang	2–1	Palau Track and Field Team
Mai; Mai	Source	Ililau

Palau Track and Field Stadium
5 December 2004

Team Bangladesh	2–0	Mount Everest Nepal
Kabir; Hat	Source

Palau Track and Field Stadium

==== Week 3 ====
12 December 2004

Daewoo Ngatpang	1–1	Mount Everest Nepal
Unknown	Source	Besnet

Palau Track and Field Stadium
12 December 2004

Team Bangladesh	2–3	Palau Track and Field Team
Unknown	Source	Ililau; Unknown x2

Palau Track and Field Stadium

== Knockout stage ==
=== Final ===
12 December 2004

Daewoo Ngatpang	2–0	Mount Everest Nepal
Unknown	Source	Unknown

Palau Track and Field Stadium

== Top scorers ==
Rank	Scorer	Club	Goals
1	(Palau) Tony Ililau	Palau Track and Field Team	4
2	(Palau) Mai Xuan Tan	Daewoo Ngatpang	2
3	(Palau) Humayon Kabir	Team Bangladesh	1
3	(Palau) Shak Hat	Mount Everest Nepal	1
3	(Palau) Buddhi Besnet	Mount Everest Nepal	1
