= 2012 Palau Soccer League =

Palau Soccer League
- Season: 2012
- Champions: Team Bangladesh
- Matches: 13 (Spring League – including KO rounds)
- Goals: 92 (7.08 per match) (Spring League – including KO rounds)
- Top goalscorer: Malakai Bitu (Team Bangladesh) (10 goals)
- Highest scoring: Taj FC 8–4 Kramers FC (15 April 2012)

The 2012 Palau Soccer League was the eighth season of association football competition in Palau, and the first that has been split into two stages: the Spring League and the Fall League. The Spring League was won by Team Bangladesh. The Spring League consisted of five rounds of matches in a round robin group stage, from which the top four qualified for semi-finals, and a play-off final. According to the fixture list, the Fall League was played in the same format, only this time each team played the others twice. This is assumed to be the first season of football since 2010 as the 2011 winner is unknown.

== Clubs ==
=== Spring league ===
- Belau Kanu Club – Founded 2012
- Biib Strykers – Founded 2012
- Kramers FC- 2008 Palau Soccer League winners
- Taj FC – Founded 2012
- Team Bangladesh – Founded 2004

=== Fall league ===
- Belau Kanu Club
- Kramers FC
- New Stars FC
- Taj FC
- Team Bangladesh

Source for both Spring and Fall League:^{,}

== Spring league stage ==
The spring league consisted of one group of five teams all playing each other once. The top four then proceeded to one-legged semi-finals to determine the two teams to contest the championship.

=== Standings ===
Pos	Team	Pld	W	D	L	GF	GA	GD	Pts	Qualification
1	Team Bangladesh (Palau) (A)	4	3	0	1	20	10	+10	9	Qualification for Semi-Finals
2	Taj FC (Palau) (A)	4	3	0	1	13	5	+8	9	Qualification for Semi-Finals
3	Kramers FC (A)	4	2	0	2	13	11	+2	6	Qualification for Semi-Finals
4	Biib Strykers (A)	4	2	0	2	10	15	−5	6	Qualification for Semi-Finals
5	Belau Kanu Club	4	0	0	4	5	20	−15	0	

Updated to match(es) played on 2 Nov 2012. Source: rsssf.com
Rules for classification: 1) points; 2) goal difference; 3) number of goals scored.
(A) Advance to a further round

=== Results ===
==== Week 1 ====
11 March 2012

Biib Strykers	4–3	Kramers FC
Unknown	Source	Unknown

Palau Track and Field Stadium
11 March 2012

Taj FC	7–0	Belau Kanu Club
Unknown	Source	Unknown

Palau Track and Field Stadium

==== Week 2 ====
18 March 2012

Belau Kanu Club	2–7	Team Bangladesh
Unknown	Source	Unknown

Palau Track and Field Stadium
18 March 2012

Taj FC	4–1	Biib Strykers
Unknown	Source	Unknown

Palau Track and Field Stadium

==== Week 3 ====
25 March 2012

Kramers FC	4–5	Team Bangladesh
Unknown	Source	Unknown

Palau Track and Field Stadium
25 March 2012

Biib Strykers	3–1	Belau Kanu Club
Unknown	Source	Unknown

Palau Track and Field Stadium

==== Week 4 ====
1 April 2012

Team Bangladesh	7–2	Biib Strykers
Unknown	Source	Unknown

Palau Track and Field Stadium
1 April 2012

Kramers FC	3–0	Taj FC
Unknown	Source	Unknown

Palau Track and Field Stadium

==== Week 5 ====
1 April 2012

Kramers FC	3–2	Belau Kanu Club
Unknown	Source	Unknown

Palau Track and Field Stadium
1 April 2012

Team Bangladesh	1–2	Taj FC
Unknown	Source	Unknown

Palau Track and Field Stadium

== Spring knockout stage ==
=== Semi-finals ===
15 April 2012

Team Bangladesh	6–1	Biib Strykers
Unknown	Source	Unknown

Palau Track and Field Stadium
15 April 2012

Taj FC	8–4	Kramers FC
Unknown	Source	Unknown

Palau Track and Field Stadium

=== Final ===
22 April 2012

Team Bangladesh	2–1	Taj FC
6' Nejam; 10' Bitu	Source	16' Futa

Palau Track and Field Stadium

== Fall league ==
The Fall League is played in the same manner as the Spring League, except in this iteration, the group stage will be played on both a home and away basis. Biib Strykers are not competing and have been replaced by New Stars FC.

=== Group stage ===
As of 2 November 2012

Pos	Team	Pld	W	D	L	GF	GA	GD	Pts	Qualification
1	New Stars FC (A)	8	7	1	0	18	9	+9	22	Qualification for Semi-Finals
2	Taj FC (Palau) (A)	8	6	1	1	29	8	+21	19	Qualification for Semi-Finals
3	Belau Kanu Club (A)	8	4	0	4	19	11	+8	12	Qualification for Semi-Finals
4	Team Bangladesh (Palau) (A)	8	2	0	6	8	23	−15	6	Qualification for Semi-Finals
5	Kramers FC	8	0	0	8	1	24	−23	0	

Updated to match(es) played on 10 February 2013. Source: 2012 PFA Adult Spring and Fall League Standings from Palau football Association
Rules for classification: 1) points; 2) goal difference; 3) number of goals scored.
(A) Advance to a further round

==== Results ====
===== Round 1 =====
14 October 2012
5.30pm

New Stars FC	5–3	Belau Kanu Club
Unknown	Source	Unknown

Palau Track and Field Stadium
14 October 2012
6.45pm

Taj FC	11–0	Kramers FC
Unknown	Source	Unknown

Palau Track and Field Stadium

===== Round 2 =====
28 October 2012

Kramers FC	1–2	New Stars FC
Unknown	Source	Unknown

Palau Track and Field Stadium
28 October 2012

Taj FC	1–8	Team Bangladesh
Unknown	Source	Unknown

Palau Track and Field Stadium

===== Round 3 =====
4 November 2012
5.30pm

Taj FC	1–0	Belau Kanu Club
Unknown	Source	Unknown

Palau Track and Field Stadium
4 November 2012
6.45pm

Team Bangladesh	2–0	Kramers FC
Unknown	Source	Unknown

Palau Track and Field Stadium

===== Round 4 =====
11 November 2012
5.30pm

Kramers FC	0–5	Belau Kanu Club
Unknown	Source	Unknown

Palau Track and Field Stadium
11 November 2012
6.45pm

New Stars FC	2–0	Team Bangladesh
Unknown	Source	Unknown

Palau Track and Field Stadium

===== Round 5 =====
25 November 2012
5.30pm

Team Bangladesh	0–4	Belau Kanu Club
Unknown	Source	Unknown

Palau Track and Field Stadium
25 November 2012
6.45pm

New Stars FC	2–2	Taj FC
Unknown	Source	Unknown

Palau Track and Field Stadium

===== Round 6 =====
16 December 2012
5.30pm

New Stars FC	3–2	Belau Kanu Club
Unknown	Source	Unknown

Palau Track and Field Stadium
17 February 2013

Taj FC	1–0	Kramers FC
Unknown	Source	Unknown

Palau Track and Field Stadium

NB: Kramers withdrew, match was awarded 1–0.

===== Round 7 =====
13 January 2013
5.30pm

Kramers FC	0–1	New Stars FC
Unknown	Source	Unknown

Palau Track and Field Stadium

NB: Kramers withdrew, match was awarded 1–0.

13 January 2013

Team Bangladesh	3–4	Taj FC
Unknown	Source	Unknown

Palau Track and Field Stadium

===== Round 8 =====
20 January 2013

New Stars FC	1–0	Team Bangladesh
Unknown	Source	Unknown

Palau Track and Field Stadium
20 January 2013

Kramers FC	0–1	Belau Kanu Club
Unknown	Source	Unknown

Palau Track and Field Stadium

NB: Kramers withdrew, match was awarded 1–0.

===== Round 9 =====
27 January 2013

Team Bangladesh	1–4	Belau Kanu Club
Unknown	Source	Unknown

Palau Track and Field Stadium
27 January 2013

New Stars FC	2–1	Taj FC
Unknown	Source	Unknown

Palau Track and Field Stadium

===== Round 10 =====
10 February 2013

Taj FC	1–0	Belau Kanu Club
Unknown	Source	Unknown

Palau Track and Field Stadium
10 February 2013

Team Bangladesh	1–0	Kramers FC
Unknown	Source	Unknown

Palau Track and Field Stadium

NB: Kramers withdrew, match was awarded 1–0.

=== Semi-finals ===
24 February 2013

Taj FC	4–3	Belau Kanu Club
Unknown	Source	Unknown

Palau Track and Field Stadium
24 February 2013

New Stars FC	2–0	Team Bangladesh
Unknown	Source	Unknown

Palau Track and Field Stadium

=== Final ===
24 February 2013

New Stars FC	3–5	Taj FC
Mac 6'; Siib 7'; Nasa 41'	Source	Harry 13', 27'; Kamatsu 52', 53'; Nishita 58'

Palau Track and Field Stadium
