= Palau Soccer League =

Association football league in Palau

- Founded: 2004; 22 years ago
- Country: Palau
- Confederation: OFC (associate member)
- Number of clubs: 5
- Level on pyramid: 1
- Current champions: Kramers (2014)
- Most championships: Team Bangladesh (3 titles)

The Palau Soccer League was the highest division of competitive association football in the nation of Palau, founded in 2004 by the Palau Soccer Association. Due to the lack of equipment and facilities, all matches are played in the Palau Track And Field Stadium outside the town of Koror, on Koror island.

The league ran until the outbreak of COVID-19.

== Champions ==
A complete list of previous league champions:

- 2004: Daewoo Ngatpang
- 2005: Team Bangladesh
- 2006: Surangel and Sons Company
- 2006–07: Team Bangladesh (2)
- 2008: Kramers
- 2009: Melekeok
- 2010: Daewoo Ngatpang (2)
- 2012 Spring: Team Bangladesh (3)
- 2012 Fall: Taj FC
- 2014: Kramers
- 2016: Surangel and Sons Company
- 2017: unknown
- 2018: unknown

=== Clubs by number of titles ===
Titles	Team	Champions in
3	Team Bangladesh	2005, 2006–07, 2012 (Spring)
2	Daewoo Ngatpang	2004, 2010
2	Kramers	2008, 2014
2	Surangel And Sons Company	2006, 2016
1	Melekeok	2009
1	Taj FC	2012 (Fall)

== Top scorers ==
Season	Top scorer	Nation	Team	Goals
2004	Tony Ililau	(Palau)	Palau Track and Field Team	4
2006–07	Tony Ililau	(Palau)	Palau Tiger Team	9
2012	Malakai Bitu	(Fiji)	Team Bangladesh	10

2004 Source:
2007 Source:
2012 Source:
Note 1: The 2007 leading goalscorers is for records that could be found, final round of results is not known and one further match is recorded only as a draw.
