= Team Bangladesh F.C. (Palau) =

Association football club in Palau

Team Bangladesh FC (Palau)
- Full name: Team Bangladesh Football Club
- Nickname: Team Bangladesh
- Founded: 2004
- Dissolved: c. 2014?
- Ground: PCC Track & Field Stadium
- Capacity: 4,000
- League: Palau Soccer League
- 2012: 1st (Spring League); 4th (Fall League)
Home colors

Team Bangladesh Football Club was a Palauan association football club that played in the Palau Soccer League. Founded in 2004, they have won the Palau Soccer League three times.

== History ==
Team Bangladesh was founded in 2004 as a club to take part in the new Palau Soccer League, which started the same year. They finished bottom of the league in their first season. In 2005, they beat Surangel and Sons Company to win the league title, and were runners-up to Surangel and Sons Company in the following season. In 2006–07, it was a third consecutive final between Team Bangladesh and Surangel and Sons Company, won 2–1 by Team Bangladesh to win the club's second title.

Team Bangladesh again competed in the league in the 2012 season. They finished as champions, beating Taj 2–1 in the final. They also competed in the 2012–13 Fall League, where they finished 4th and lost to New Stars in the playoff semi-final.

They were absent from the league in 2014.

== Honors ==
- Palau Soccer League: 3

2005, 2006–07, 2012.
