= Guam national baseball team =

Information
- Country: Guam
- Federation: Guam Baseball Federation
- Confederation: Baseball Confederation of Oceania
- Team Colors: Dark blue, red, white

WBSC ranking
- Current: 44 (26 October 2026)

The Guam national baseball team also known as "The Ko'ko' Birds" is the national baseball team of Guam. The team represents Guam in international competitions. Guam has competed in the Asian Baseball Championship and Oceania Baseball Championship.

== Results ==
World Baseball Classic

- 2006–2009: Not invited
- 2013–2026: Not invited to qualifiers

WBSC Premier12

- 2015–2024: Not qualified

Asian Baseball Championship

- 1987: 4th
- 1989: 5th
- 1991: 7th

Oceania Baseball Championship

- 1999: (gold) 1st
- 2003: (silver) 2nd

Pacific Games

- 1999: (gold) 1st
- 2003: (gold) 1st
- 2007: Did not enter
- 2011: (silver) 2nd

Pacific Mini Games

- 2005: (gold) 1st
- 2022: (silver) 2nd
- 2025: (silver) 2nd

== Medal earnings ==
- 1999 : (gold) 1st (1999 South Pacific Games)
- 1999: (gold) 1st (1999 Oceania Baseball Championship)
- 2003 : (gold) 1st (2003 South Pacific Games)
- 2003: (silver) 2nd (2003 Oceania Baseball Championship)
- 2005 : (gold) 1st (2005 Mini South Pacific Games)
- 2011 : (silver) 2nd (2011 South Pacific Games)
- 2014 : (gold) 1st (Micronesian Games, Pohnpei, FSM)
- 2022 : (silver) 2nd (2022 Pacific Mini Games)
- 2025: (silver) 2nd (2025 Pacific Mini Games)
