= Palau Football Association =

Governing body for association football in Palau

- Founded: 28 May 2002; 24 years ago at Koror
- FIFA affiliation: none
- President: Destin Penland
- Website: PFA

The Palau Football Association is the governing body for association football in Palau. The association is based in the town of Koror. Palau currently is not a member of the Oceania Football Confederation (OFC), the Asian Football Federation (AFC), or FIFA.

The association administers the national football team and the Palau Soccer League, as well as the Palau Youth Soccer League.

== Organization ==
The Palau Football Association (PFA) was incorporated on 28 May 2002 under the laws of the Republic of Palau as a non-profit corporation. It is one of 14 federations of the Palau National Olympic Committee (PNOC). There is a small volunteer board that is primarily responsible to conduct all the activities of the association along with a handful of volunteer parent/coaches. (From the PFA website)

== Regional affiliation ==
After its creation the PFA was listed as an associate member of the OFC. Subsequently, this status was lost and has not been regained as of the 4 October 2023.

In 2009 the PFA requested to become a quasi-member of the East Asia Football Federation. Since 2013, no further progress has been made.

== See also ==
- Football in Palau
- List of football clubs in Palau
