= Time in Palau =

Overview of Palau Time

Time in Palau is given by Palau Time (PWT; UTC+09:00). Palau does not have an associated daylight saving time.

Palau Time is equivalent to Japan Standard Time, Korean Standard Time, Pyongyang Time (North Korea), Eastern Indonesia Standard Time, East Timorese Standard Time, and Yakutsk Time (Russia).

== IANA time zone database ==
The IANA time zone database gives Palau one time zone, Pacific/Palau.

c.c.*	coordinates*	TZ*	Comments	UTC offset	DST
PW	+0720+13429	Pacific/Palau		+09:00	+09:00
