= 2022 Pacific Mini Games =

XI Pacific Mini Games
- Country: Northern Marianas
- Motto: Rising up to the challenge
- Nations: 20
- Athletes: 1,034
- Events: 144 in 9 sports
- Opening: 17 June
- Closing: 25 June
- Opened by: Ralph Torres; Northern Mariana Islands Governor
- Torch lighter: Kurt Barnes
- Main venue: Oleai Sports Complex

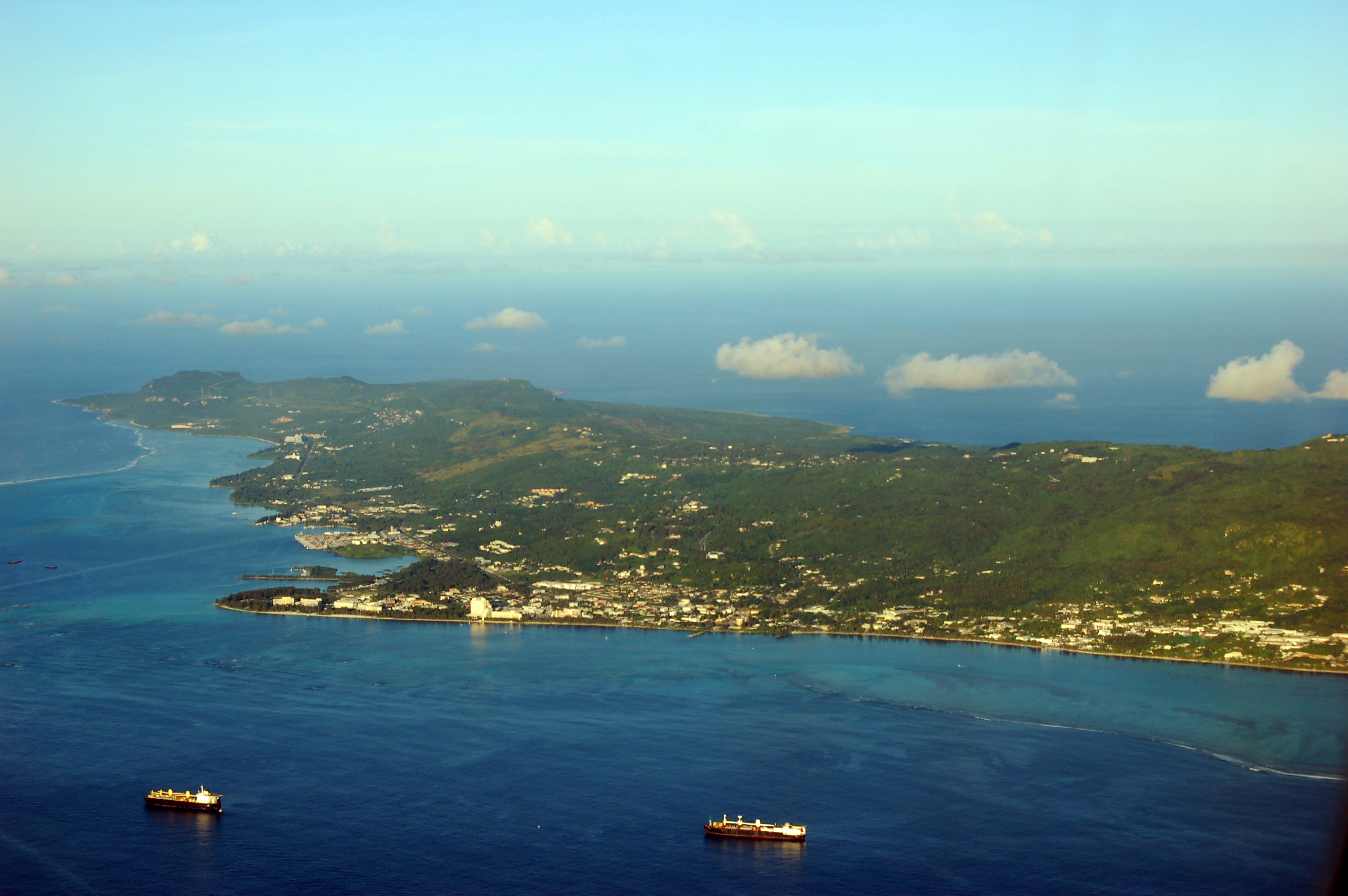
Saipan was selected as the host of the 2022 Pacific Mini Games

The 2022 Pacific Mini Games was held in Saipan, Northern Mariana Islands. It was the eleventh edition of the Pacific Mini Games and the first to be hosted by the Commonwealth of Northern Mariana Islands. This event was originally going to be held in 2021, but was postponed to 2022 due to COVID-19 pandemic.

== Host selection ==
The Northern Mariana Islands were awarded the rights to host the games on July 4, 2014 during the Pacific Games Councils General Assembly meeting in Port Moresby, Papua New Guinea. The decision was unanimous after the CNMI were the only bidder after the deadline.

== Venues and infrastructure ==
Competition venues
| Venue | Events |
|---|---|
| Oleai Sports Complex - Track and Field | Athletics |
| Gilbert C. Ada Gymnasium | Badminton |
| Francisco “Tan Ko” M. Baseball Field | Baseball |
| Crowne Plaza Resort Saipan | Beach volleyball |
| Jones Beach, Tinian | Beach volleyball |
| Coral Ocean Golf Resort | Golf |
| 13th Fishermen Memorial Monument | Outrigger canoeing |
| American Memorial Park | Tennis |
| Pacific Islands Club Saipan | Tennis |
| Rota - West Marine Harbor | Triathlon |
| Marianas High School Gym | Weightlifting |

== Sports ==
An initial twelve sports were scheduled for the games but this was reduced to six in 2019, following the impact of Typhoon Yutu. The program was later increased to nine sports with the inclusion of va'a (outrigger canoeing), tennis and weightlifting in 2021.

- Athletics (49)
- Badminton (6)
- Baseball (1)
- Beach volleyball (2)
- Golf (4)
- Outrigger canoeing (12)
- Tennis (7)
- Triathlon (5)
- Weightlifting (60)
Notes Numbers in parentheses indicate the number of medal events that will be contested in each sport, where known.

== Participating nations ==
As of 1 June 2022, twenty countries and territories have confirmed their participation in the games.

Pacific Games Associations
- American Samoa (3)
- Australia (19)
- Cook Islands (10)
- Federated States of Micronesia (7)
- Fiji (125)
- Guam (101)
- Kiribati (23)
- Nauru (38)
- New Caledonia (109)
- Norfolk Island (3)
- Northern Mariana Islands (135) (Host)
- Palau (47)
- Papua New Guinea (91)
- Samoa (31)
- Solomon Islands (117)
- Tahiti (90)
- Tonga (12)
- Tuvalu (15)
- Vanuatu (28)
- Wallis and Futuna (42)

== Medal table ==
The final medal tally of the 2022 Pacific Mini Games.

* Host nation (Northern Mariana Islands)

| Rank | Nation | Gold | Silver | Bronze | Total |
|---|---|---|---|---|---|
| 1 | Papua New Guinea | 33 | 28 | 19 | 80 |
| 2 | French Polynesia | 22 | 15 | 21 | 58 |
| 3 | Northern Mariana Islands* | 16 | 13 | 9 | 38 |
| 4 | Australia | 16 | 3 | 3 | 22 |
| 5 | New Caledonia | 11 | 26 | 17 | 54 |
| 6 | Guam | 10 | 5 | 11 | 26 |
| 7 | Fiji | 9 | 17 | 17 | 43 |
| 8 | Samoa | 8 | 5 | 8 | 21 |
| 9 | Solomon Islands | 5 | 18 | 6 | 29 |
| 10 | Tonga | 4 | 0 | 3 | 7 |
| 11 | Kiribati | 3 | 0 | 1 | 4 |
| 11 | Palau | 3 | 0 | 1 | 4 |
| 13 | Vanuatu | 2 | 5 | 1 | 8 |
| 14 | Tuvalu | 2 | 0 | 1 | 3 |
| 15 | Cook Islands | 0 | 1 | 3 | 4 |
| 16 | Wallis and Futuna | 0 | 0 | 6 | 6 |
| 17 | Norfolk Island | 0 | 0 | 2 | 2 |
| 18 | American Samoa | 0 | 0 | 0 | 0 |
| 18 | Micronesia | 0 | 0 | 0 | 0 |
| 18 | Nauru | 0 | 0 | 0 | 0 |
| Totals (20 entries) | | 144 | 136 | 129 | 409 |

== Calendar ==
The following table provides a summary of the competition schedule.

| OC | Opening ceremony | ● | Event competitions | 1 | Event finals | CC | Closing ceremony |

| June 2022 | 15th Wed | 16th Thu | 17th Fri | 18th Sat | 19th Sun | 20th Mon | 21st Tue | 22nd Wed | 23rd Thu | 24th Fri | 25th Sat | 26th Sun | 27th Mon | Gold medals |
|---|---|---|---|---|---|---|---|---|---|---|---|---|---|---|
| Ceremonies | | | OC | | | | | | | | CC | | | |
| Athletics | | | | | | ● | ● | ● | ● | ● | ● | | | 47 |
| Badminton | | | ● | 1 | | ● | ● | 5 | | | | | | 6 |
| Baseball | | | ● | ● | ● | ● | ● | ● | ● | ● | ● | | | 1 |
| Beach volleyball | | | | | | ● | ● | ● | ● | 2 | | | | 2 |
| Golf | | | | | | | | ● | ● | ● | 4 | | | 4 |
| Tennis | | ● | ● | ● | 2 | ● | ● | ● | ● | 3 | 2 | | | 7 |
| Triathlon | | | | | | | | | 2 | 2 | | | | 4 |
| Weightlifting | | | | | | 15 | 15 | 15 | 15 | | | | | 60 |
| Va'a | | | | | | ● | ● | | ● | ● | | | | 12 |
