= Palau national baseball team =

Information
- Country: Palau
- Federation: Palau Baseball & Softball Federation
- Confederation: WBSC Oceania
- Team Colors: Blue, Yellow, White

WBSC ranking
- Current: 62 ▼3 (31 December 2025)

The Palau national baseball team is the national baseball team of Palau. Competes at the South Pacific Games, has won Bronze, Silver and Gold in their last three appearances.

== Results ==
World Baseball Classic

- 2006-2009 : Not invited
- 2013-2026 : Did not enter

Baseball World Cup

- 1938-2011 : Did not enter

World Games

- 1981 : Not invited

International Amateur Baseball Tournament

- 1968 : Not invited

WBSC Premier12

- 2015-2024 : Not qualified

Intercontinental Cup

- 1973-2010 : Not invited

Oceania Baseball Championship

- 1999-2007 : Did not enter

Pacific Games

- 1999 : 4th
- 2003 : (bronze) 3rd
- 2007 : (gold) 1st
- 2011 : (bronze) 3rd

Pacific Mini Games

- 2005 : (silver) 2nd
- 2022 : (bronze) 3rd
- 2025: (gold) 1st

Micronesian Games

- 1969 : (gold) 1st
- 1990 : (gold) 1st
- 1994 : (bronze) 3rd
- 1998 : (gold) 1st
- 2002 : (bronze) 3rd
- 2006 : (bronze) 3rd
- 2010 : (gold) 1st
- 2014 : (bronze) 3rd
- 2018 : 4th

U-23 Baseball World Cup

- 2014-2024 : Did not enter

U-23 Oceania Baseball Championship

- 2022-2023 : Did not enter

U-18 Baseball World Cup

- 1981-2002 : Did not enter
- 2004 : Not qualified
- 2006-2017 : Did not enter
- 2019 : Not qualified
- 2022-2023 : Did not enter

U-18 Oceania Baseball Championship

- 2004 : (silver) 2nd
- 2006-2017 : Did not enter
- 2019 : 5th
- 2022 : Did not enter

U-15 Baseball World Cup

- 1989-2024 : Did not enter

U-15 Oceania Baseball Championship

- 2003-2023 : Did not enter

U-12 Baseball World Cup

- 2011-2023 : Did not enter

U-12 Oceania Baseball Championship

- 2017 : Did not enter

Women's Baseball World Cup

- 2004-2018 : Did not enter
- 2024 : Not qualified
