= Belau Games =

Multi-sport event in Palau

- Status: Active
- Genre: Multi-sport event
- Frequency: Biennial
- Country: Palau
- Organiser: Palau National Olympic Committee

The Belau Games is a multi-sport event held in Palau, organised by the Palau National Olympic Committee. It is competed between the sixteen states of Palau. It has been held in only odd-numbered years since 2007, but has been played in other years before then.

It is known to have been competed as early as 1997.

People of all ages can compete at the Belau Games - in 2021 athletes aged from 4 to 67 years old competed.

As the state with the largest population, Koror has usually been the most successful.

== Recent years ==
The 2017 Belau Games went ahead despite an epidemic of dengue fever and a severe drought being forecasted. 14 out of 16 state governors had wanted it postponed. It was won by Koror. Five states opted not to compete; they were Kayangel, Ngiwal, Melekeok, Aimeliik and Ngeremlengui. Koror again won in 2019.

Koror won again in 2021 and 2023. In 2023, two of the states with the lowest population, Sonsorol and Hatohobei, came 2nd and 3rd.

The 2025 Belau Games have been postponed to 2026 due to budget challenges and clashes with other events.

== Sports ==
The 15th Belau Games, postponed to 2026, is set to include the following sports:

- Athletics
- Archery
- Badminton
- Baseball
- Basketball (3x3 and 5x5)
- Canoeing
- Judo
- Micro all-around
- Sailing
- Spear fishing
- Table tennis
- Tennis
- Triathlon
- Volleyball (indoor and outdoor)
- Weightlifting
- Wrestling

=== Former sports ===
Football was first played in the Belau Games in 2009, but the first season where results are known is 2011. Football was also planned to be played in the 2007 Belau Games, but in the end it was not held. After a hiatus the sport reappeared in 2017, and was played again in 2019.

Softball has also been played at the Belau Games.

== Winners ==
- 2007 (6th) - Koror
- 2009 (7th)
- 2011 (8th)
- 2013 (9th)
- 2015 (10th)
- 2017 (11th) - Koror
- 2019 (12th) - Koror
- 2021 (13th) - Koror
- 2023 (14th) - Koror
- 2026 (15th)
