= American Samoa national baseball team =

National sports teams of American Samoa

Information
- Country: American Samoa
- Confederation: Baseball Confederation of Oceania

WBSC ranking
- Current: NR (26 October 2026)

The American Samoa national baseball team is the national baseball team of American Samoa. They have competed at the South Pacific Games, and have won Silver and Bronze at the event.

== Record ==
South Pacific Games

- 2003 : (silver) 2nd
- 2007 : (bronze) 3rd

== See also ==
- Sports in American Samoa
