= National Stadium (Palau) =

Multi-purpose sports stadium in Koror, Palau

Palau National Stadium
- PCC Track and Field Stadium
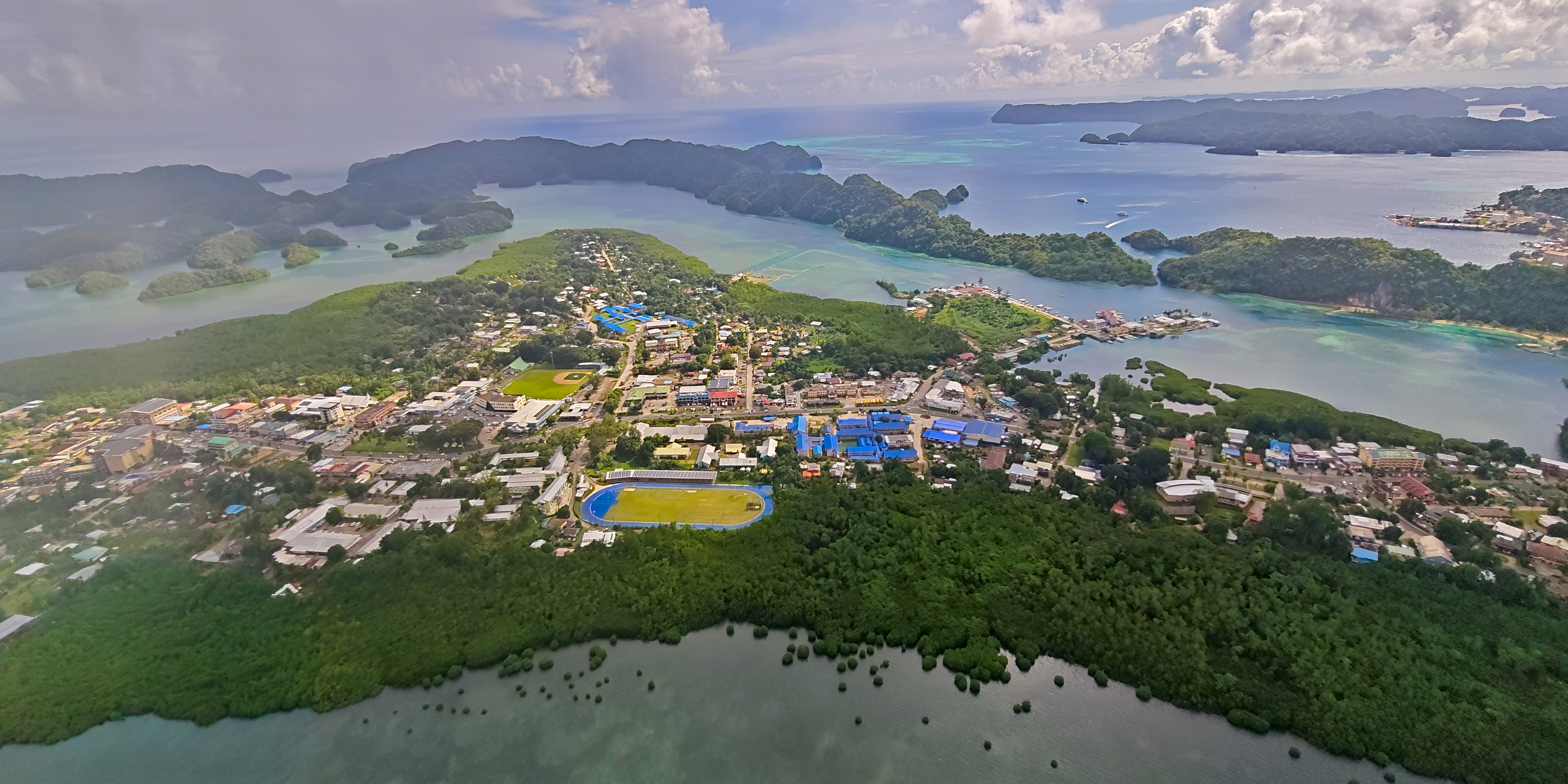
- Stadium, center, seen from the air in 2025
- Interactive map of Palau National Stadium
- Full name: Palau National Stadium
- Location: Koror City, Koror, Palau
- Coordinates: 7.343314°N 134.47226°E
- Owner: Palauan government
- Capacity: 4,000
- Surface: Natural grass

Tenants
- Palau Soccer Association (among many); Palau national football team

The Palau National Stadium (PCC Track & Field Stadium) is a multi-purpose sports stadium in Koror City, Palau. It is used primarily for track and field events as well as many football matches. The stadium has a capacity of 4,000.

== Football ==
The stadium is used by the Palau Soccer Association as a venue for the competitive football matches that it oversees, as well as being the home stadium for the Palau national football team.

The national stadium is used by the following teams and leagues:

- Palau national football team (as Home stadium)
- Palau Soccer League (for all games, due to lack of suitable venues in Palau).
- Belau Games - for all football matches.
