= Swimming at the 1975 South Pacific Games =

Swimming at the 1975 South Pacific Games took place in Agana, the capital of Guam on 2–9 August 1975. It was the fifth edition of the South Pacific Games. Four new events were included in 1975 (4 x 200 metre Freestyle relay and 100m Breaststroke added to both the men's and women's programs). Of the other events previously contested, only one remained without a new South Pacific Games record at the end of the competition after sixteen records were broken in Guam. The teams from the French-administered territories of French Polynesia (Tahiti) and New Caledonia won the most gold medals. The most successful individual swimmer, however, was Papua New Guinea's Charlie Martin who won eight medals, four of which were gold.

== Medal summary ==
=== Medal table ===
Rank	Nation	Gold	Silver	Bronze	Total
1	French Polynesia (TAH)	8	6	5	19
2	New Caledonia (NCL)	8	5	7	20
3	Papua New Guinea (PNG)	5	9	7	21
4	Guam (GUM)	0	1	1	2
5	Fiji (FIJ)	0	0	1	1
Totals (5 entries)		21	21	21	63

=== Men ===
French Polynesia (Tahiti) and Papua New Guinea won 7 and 5 gold medals respectively in the 12 men's events.

Event	Gold		Silver		Bronze	
100m Freestyle	(Papua New Guinea) Charles Martin (PNG)	54.71 ^{ GR }	(French Polynesia) R. Chapman (TAH)	57.19	(French Polynesia) C. Ceran (TAH)	57.77
200m Freestyle	(French Polynesia) Henry Noble (TAH)	2:04.28 ^{ GR }	(Papua New Guinea) Charles Martin (PNG)	2:04.71	(French Polynesia) R. Chapman (TAH)	2:05.94
400m Freestyle	(French Polynesia) Henry Noble (TAH)	4:28.58 ^{ GR }	(Papua New Guinea) M. Hutchings (PNG)	4:34.89	(New Caledonia) E Verlaguet (NCL)	4:37.81
1500m Freestyle	(Papua New Guinea) M. Hutchings (PNG)	18:16.18	(New Caledonia) E Verlaguet (NCL)	18:24.11	(French Polynesia) R. Chapman (TAH)	18:42.21
100m Backstroke	(Papua New Guinea) Charles Martin (PNG)	1:03.12 ^{ GR }	(French Polynesia) Henry Noble (TAH)	1:04.47	(French Polynesia) C. Ceran (TAH)	1:10.34
100m Breaststroke^{NE}	(French Polynesia) P. Hunter (TAH)	1:15.70	(Guam) G. Burke (GUM)	1:16.06	(Papua New Guinea) O. Moi (PNG)	1:16.30
200m Breaststroke	(French Polynesia) P. Hunter (TAH)	2:48.12	(Papua New Guinea) Donald Martin (PNG)	2:48.20	(Guam) G. Burke (GUM)	2:49.54
100m Butterfly	(Papua New Guinea) Charles Martin (PNG)	1:00.33 ^{ GR }	(New Caledonia) Andre Mouren (NCL)	1:03.73	(Papua New Guinea) Donald Martin (PNG)	1:04.84
200m I.M.	(Papua New Guinea) Charles Martin (PNG)	2:21.29 ^{ GR }	(French Polynesia) R. Chapman (TAH)	2:22.64	(Papua New Guinea) M. Hutchings (PNG)	2:24.32
4 × 100 m Medley relay	French Polynesia	4:24.82 ^{ GR }	Papua New Guinea	4:27.44	New Caledonia	4:36.60
4 × 100 m Freestyle relay	French Polynesia	3:48.59 ^{ GR }	Papua New Guinea	3:53.68	New Caledonia	3:59.94
4 × 200 m Freestyle relay^{NE}	French Polynesia	8:34.61	Papua New Guinea	8:44.94	New Caledonia	8:56.28

=== Women ===
New Caledonia dominated the women's events, winning 8 of the 9 gold medals available.

Event	Gold		Silver		Bronze	
100m Freestyle	(French Polynesia) Maeva Lavigne (TAH)	1:04.62 ^{ GR }	(New Caledonia) D. Maussion (NCL)	1:04.64	(Fiji) L. Fisher (FIJ)	1:05.89
200m Freestyle	(New Caledonia) Y. Saminadin (NCL)	2:18.54 ^{ GR }	(French Polynesia) Maeva Lavigne (TAH)	2:20.23	(New Caledonia) C. Bernados (NCL)	2:21.19
400m Freestyle	(New Caledonia) Y. Saminadin (NCL)	4:51.41 ^{ GR }	(New Caledonia) P. LeGras (NCL)	4:53.09	(New Caledonia) D. Maussion (NCL)	5:05.07
800m Freestyle	(New Caledonia) Y. Saminadin (NCL)	9:48.20 ^{ GR }	(New Caledonia) P. LeGras (NCL)	10:14.7	(New Caledonia) D. Maussion (NCL)	
100m Breaststroke^{NE}	(New Caledonia) P. LeGras (NCL)	1:24.01	(Papua New Guinea) L. Moyle (PNG)	1:25.66	(Papua New Guinea) J. Kohnke (PNG)	1:29.75
200m Breaststroke	(New Caledonia) P. LeGras (NCL)	3:00.66 ^{ GR }	(Papua New Guinea) L. Moyle (PNG)	3:09.55	(Papua New Guinea) J. Kohnke (PNG)	3:12.79
4 × 100 m Medley relay	New Caledonia	5:02.00 ^{ GR }	French Polynesia	5:05.96	Papua New Guinea	5:29.78
4 × 100 m Freestyle relay	New Caledonia	4:26.22 ^{ GR }	French Polynesia	4:29.69	Papua New Guinea	4:33.78
4 × 200 m Freestyle relay^{NE}	New Caledonia	9:32.03	Papua New Guinea	9:57.29	French Polynesia	10:00.81

== Notes ==
^{NE} denotes new event to the South Pacific Games.

^{GR} denotes South Pacific Games record time.

== Participating countries ==
Teams entered in the swimming competition included:

- Fiji
- Guam
- (Federated States of Micronesia) Micronesia
- New Caledonia
- Papua New Guinea
- French Polynesia
