= Weightlifting at the 2019 Pacific Games – Results =

The weightlifting competition at the 2019 Pacific Games in Apia, Samoa was held on 9–13 July 2019 at the Faleata Sports Complex in Tuanaimato. The competition included ten men's and ten women's weight classes, with separate medals awarded in each weight class for the snatch and clean and jerk, as well as for the total lift.

Together with that year's Commonwealth and Oceania Championships, they were held concurrently as a single event designated the 2019 Pacific Games, Oceania & Commonwealth Championships. Athletes from certain countries were able to contest multiple championships simultaneously (including age-group variants).

== Results ==
=== Men's 55 kg ===
Rank	Athlete	Group	Snatch (kg)				Clean & Jerk (kg)				Total
Rank	Athlete	Group	1	2	3	Rank	1	2	3	Rank	Total
1st place, gold medalist(s)	Elson Brechtefeld (NRU)	A	88	~~93~~	93	1st place, gold medalist(s)	112	117	122	1st place, gold medalist(s)	215
2nd place, silver medalist(s)	Gahuana Nauari (PNG)	A	~~80~~	80	~~85~~	3rd place, bronze medalist(s)	~~101~~	101	108	2nd place, silver medalist(s)	188
3rd place, bronze medalist(s)	Walter Shadrack (SOL)	A	80	~~85~~	~~85~~	2nd place, silver medalist(s)	100	105	~~109~~	4	185
4	Scofield Sinaka (PNG)	A	75	~~78~~	~~78~~	4	~~101~~	101	108	3rd place, bronze medalist(s)	183
5	Mike Riklon (SOL)	A	~~68~~	72	75	5	~~90~~	93	~~100~~	5	168
—	Kaimauri Erati (KIR)	A	~~60~~	~~60~~	~~60~~	—	70	75	~~83~~	6	—

=== Men's 61 kg ===
Rank	Athlete	Group	Snatch (kg)				Clean & Jerk (kg)				Total
Rank	Athlete	Group	1	2	3	Rank	1	2	3	Rank	Total
1st place, gold medalist(s)	Morea Baru (PNG)	A	115	120	124	1st place, gold medalist(s)	150	160	~~164~~	1st place, gold medalist(s)	284
2nd place, silver medalist(s)	Cester Ramohaka (SOL)	A	95	99	~~103~~	2nd place, silver medalist(s)	~~127~~	~~127~~	127	2nd place, silver medalist(s)	226
3rd place, bronze medalist(s)	John Tafi (SAM)	A	85	90	95	3rd place, bronze medalist(s)	~~115~~	~~115~~	115	3rd place, bronze medalist(s)	210
4	Tatake Iete (KIR)	A	75	80	85	4	88	93	102	4	187
5	Kilian Ananke Teyssier (NCL)	A	67	70	74	5	87	92	95	5	169
6	Chrisman Gioura (NRU)	A	67	~~71~~	~~71~~	6	~~85~~	85	89	6	156

=== Men's 67 kg ===
Rank	Athlete	Group	Snatch (kg)				Clean & Jerk (kg)				Total
Rank	Athlete	Group	1	2	3	Rank	1	2	3	Rank	Total
1st place, gold medalist(s)	Vaipava Ioane (SAM)	A	123	125	~~126~~	1st place, gold medalist(s)	161	164	~~166~~	1st place, gold medalist(s)	289
2nd place, silver medalist(s)	Ruben Katoatau (KIR)	A	122	~~124~~	~~124~~	2nd place, silver medalist(s)	160	~~165~~	~~165~~	2nd place, silver medalist(s)	282
3rd place, bronze medalist(s)	Ezekiel Moses (NRU)	A	110	115	~~120~~	3rd place, bronze medalist(s)	145	~~152~~	~~152~~	3rd place, bronze medalist(s)	260
4	Brocka Scotty (NRU)	A	100	105	107	4	127	131	~~135~~	4	238
5	Stan Eddie Donga (SOL)	A	95	97	101	6	125	127	~~130~~	5	228
6	Samuela Nasila (FIJ)	B	77	84	88	7	100	105	110	6	198
7	Waisea Qalo (FIJ)	B	70	75	80	8	95	101	105	7	185
8	Esmen Maltungtung (VAN)	B	50	~~55~~	55	9	70	75	~~78~~	8	130
—	Manuila Raobu (TUV)	A	101	~~106~~	106	5	~~126~~	~~126~~	~~126~~	—	—

=== Men's 73 kg ===
Rank	Athlete	Group	Snatch (kg)				Clean & Jerk (kg)				Total
Rank	Athlete	Group	1	2	3	Rank	1	2	3	Rank	Total
1st place, gold medalist(s)	Brandon Wakeling (AUS)	A	118	123	~~127~~	2nd place, silver medalist(s)	157	162	167	1st place, gold medalist(s)	290
2nd place, silver medalist(s)	Taretiita Tabaroua (KIR)	A	120	124	~~127~~	1st place, gold medalist(s)	158	~~163~~	~~163~~	2nd place, silver medalist(s)	282
3rd place, bronze medalist(s)	Larko Doguape (NRU)	A	~~120~~	~~120~~	120	4	~~145~~	145	150	3rd place, bronze medalist(s)	270
4	Ika Aliklik (NRU)	A	115	~~121~~	121	3rd place, bronze medalist(s)	140	~~146~~	146	4	267
5	Joshua Ralpho (MHL)	A	100	~~105~~	105	5	130	135	140	5	245
6	Kaia Davis (NIU)	B	72	75	80	6	98	105	~~110~~	7	185
7	Robinson Wotlelen (VAN)	B	65	70	73	7	82	87	~~92~~	8	160
8	Samson Kwanpiken (VAN)	B	~~60~~	~~60~~	60	8	80	85	~~90~~	9	145
—	David Bautista (GUM)	A	~~105~~	~~105~~	~~105~~	—	130	135	~~140~~	6	—

=== Men's 81 kg ===
Rank	Athlete	Group	Snatch (kg)				Clean & Jerk (kg)				Total
Rank	Athlete	Group	1	2	3	Rank	1	2	3	Rank	Total
1st place, gold medalist(s)	Cameron McTaggart (NZL)	A	133	137	~~141~~	2nd place, silver medalist(s)	160	164	168	1st place, gold medalist(s)	305
2nd place, silver medalist(s)	Jack Opeloge (SAM)	A	126	131	138	1st place, gold medalist(s)	~~160~~	~~160~~	160	3rd place, bronze medalist(s)	298
3rd place, bronze medalist(s)	Kabuati Bob (MHL)	A	120	125	128	3rd place, bronze medalist(s)	160	~~165~~	~~168~~	2nd place, silver medalist(s)	288
4	Titara Kaiti (KIR)	A	120	~~125~~	125	5	155	~~160~~	~~161~~	4	280
5	Tuau Lapua Lapua (TUV)	A	116	121	126	4	143	150	153	5	279
6	Patrick Veidreyaki (FIJ)	B	110	114	117	6	145	151	~~160~~	6	268
7	Uea Detudamo (NRU)	B	110	115	~~118~~	8	137	142	146	7	261
8	Petrillo Menke (NRU)	B	95	~~100~~	100	9	135	140	145	8	245
9	Anthony Saru (SOL)	B	95	~~100~~	100	10	125	127	130	9	230
—	Toua Udia (PNG)	A	~~116~~	116	~~121~~	7	~~151~~	~~151~~	~~151~~	—	—

=== Men's 89 kg ===
Rank	Athlete	Group	Snatch (kg)				Clean & Jerk (kg)				Total
Rank	Athlete	Group	1	2	3	Rank	1	2	3	Rank	Total
1st place, gold medalist(s)	Don Opeloge (SAM)	A	145	~~151~~	~~157~~	1st place, gold medalist(s)	~~185~~	185	193	1st place, gold medalist(s)	338
2nd place, silver medalist(s)	Boris Elesin (AUS)	A	134	138	142	2nd place, silver medalist(s)	152	163	168	2nd place, silver medalist(s)	308
3rd place, bronze medalist(s)	Joel Gregson (AUS)	A	121	126	~~131~~	3rd place, bronze medalist(s)	149	162	~~165~~	3rd place, bronze medalist(s)	288
4	Timothy Vakuruivalu (FIJ)	A	111	115	120	4	138	~~143~~	~~143~~	6	258
5	Marcincy Cook (NRU)	A	~~106~~	106	110	5	133	137	141	5	279
6	Amimiasi Umata (FIJ)	B	90	95	102	6	134	138	142	4	244

=== Men's 96 kg ===
Rank	Athlete	Group	Snatch (kg)				Clean & Jerk (kg)				Total
Rank	Athlete	Group	1	2	3	Rank	1	2	3	Rank	Total
1st place, gold medalist(s)	Steven Kari (PNG)	A	145	152	156	2nd place, silver medalist(s)	198	~~210~~	~~210~~	1st place, gold medalist(s)	354
2nd place, silver medalist(s)	Israel Kaikilekofe (WLF)	A	153	157	161	1st place, gold medalist(s)	183	192	~~195~~	2nd place, silver medalist(s)	353
3rd place, bronze medalist(s)	Maeu Nanai Livi (SAM)	A	~~146~~	146	154	3rd place, bronze medalist(s)	~~174~~	174	181	3rd place, bronze medalist(s)	335
4	Ridge Barredo (AUS)	A	135	139	~~144~~	4	175	~~182~~	~~182~~	4	314
5	Beru Karianako (KIR)	A	110	~~115~~	115	5	140	145	~~152~~	5	260
6	Freedom Scotty (NRU)	A	100	~~110~~	110	6	~~135~~	135	140	6	250

=== Men's 102 kg ===
Rank	Athlete	Group	Snatch (kg)				Clean & Jerk (kg)				Total
Rank	Athlete	Group	1	2	3	Rank	1	2	3	Rank	Total
1st place, gold medalist(s)	David Katoatau (KIR)	A	138	~~142~~	142	2nd place, silver medalist(s)	196	~~201~~	—	1st place, gold medalist(s)	338
2nd place, silver medalist(s)	Petelo Lautusi (SAM)	A	130	140	~~143~~	3rd place, bronze medalist(s)	160	170	~~176~~	2nd place, silver medalist(s)	310
—	Petunu Opeloge (SAM)	A	144	150	—	1st place, gold medalist(s)	~~195~~	~~195~~	~~195~~	—	—

=== Men's 109 kg ===
Rank	Athlete	Group	Snatch (kg)				Clean & Jerk (kg)				Total
Rank	Athlete	Group	1	2	3	Rank	1	2	3	Rank	Total
1st place, gold medalist(s)	Sanele Mao (SAM)	A	~~150~~	150	160	1st place, gold medalist(s)	196	~~205~~	206	1st place, gold medalist(s)	366
2nd place, silver medalist(s)	Tanumafili Jungblut (ASA)	A	~~140~~	~~142~~	142	4	190	194	~~197~~	2nd place, silver medalist(s)	336
3rd place, bronze medalist(s)	Jackson Roberts-Young (AUS)	A	137	~~141~~	141	5	181	189	192	3rd place, bronze medalist(s)	333
4	Matthew Lydement (AUS)	A	151	156	~~161~~	2nd place, silver medalist(s)	175	~~181~~	~~182~~	6	331
5	Sio Pomelile (TGA)	A	140	~~143~~	143	3rd place, bronze medalist(s)	~~185~~	185	~~190~~	4	328
6	Andrius Barakauskas (NZL)	A	~~140~~	~~140~~	140	6	170	176	~~182~~	5	316

=== Men's +109 kg ===
Rank	Athlete	Group	Snatch (kg)				Clean & Jerk (kg)				Total
Rank	Athlete	Group	1	2	3	Rank	1	2	3	Rank	Total
1st place, gold medalist(s)	Aisake Tuitupou (TGA)	A	140	~~145~~	~~150~~	3rd place, bronze medalist(s)	190	~~195~~	~~200~~	1st place, gold medalist(s)	330
2nd place, silver medalist(s)	Malachi Faamausilifala (SAM)	A	122	127	131	4	150	~~160~~	~~160~~	2nd place, silver medalist(s)	281
—	Lauititi Lui (SAM)	A	174	178	~~180~~	1st place, gold medalist(s)	~~205~~	~~205~~	~~205~~	—	—
—	David Liti (NZL)	A	173	177	~~180~~	2nd place, silver medalist(s)	~~220~~	~~220~~	~~220~~	—	—

=== Women's 45 kg ===
Rank	Athlete	Group	Snatch (kg)				Clean & Jerk (kg)				Total
Rank	Athlete	Group	1	2	3	Rank	1	2	3	Rank	Total
1st place, gold medalist(s)	Tebora Willy (KIR)	A	48	~~51~~	52	1st place, gold medalist(s)	~~62~~	64	67	1st place, gold medalist(s)	119
2nd place, silver medalist(s)	Konio Toua (PNG)	A	47	50	~~53~~	2nd place, silver medalist(s)	~~65~~	65	~~70~~	2nd place, silver medalist(s)	115
3rd place, bronze medalist(s)	Daniella Ika (NRU)	A	30	35	~~39~~	3rd place, bronze medalist(s)	~~43~~	43	47	4	82
—	Dayalani Reiko Vida Calma (GUM)	A	~~47~~	~~47~~	~~47~~	—	58	60	63	3rd place, bronze medalist(s)	—

=== Women's 49 kg ===
Rank	Athlete	Group	Snatch (kg)				Clean & Jerk (kg)				Total
Rank	Athlete	Group	1	2	3	Rank	1	2	3	Rank	Total
1st place, gold medalist(s)	Dika Toua (PNG)	A	65	70	75	1st place, gold medalist(s)	85	93	100	1st place, gold medalist(s)	175
2nd place, silver medalist(s)	Dalamaya Aiko Vida Calma (GUM)	A	~~50~~	50	53	2nd place, silver medalist(s)	60	64	~~66~~	3rd place, bronze medalist(s)	117
3rd place, bronze medalist(s)	Jaylyn Mala (SOL)	A	47	50	~~53~~	3rd place, bronze medalist(s)	57	63	65	2nd place, silver medalist(s)	115

=== Women's 55 kg ===
Rank	Athlete	Group	Snatch (kg)				Clean & Jerk (kg)				Total
Rank	Athlete	Group	1	2	3	Rank	1	2	3	Rank	Total
1st place, gold medalist(s)	Mary Kini Lifu (SOL)	A	70	73	~~75~~	1st place, gold medalist(s)	86	89	~~92~~	1st place, gold medalist(s)	162
2nd place, silver medalist(s)	Jacinta Sumagaysay (GUM)	A	65	71	~~74~~	2nd place, silver medalist(s)	88	~~92~~	~~92~~	2nd place, silver medalist(s)	159
3rd place, bronze medalist(s)	Elizabeth Bisafo (SOL)	A	65	69	~~72~~	3rd place, bronze medalist(s)	~~83~~	83	~~86~~	3rd place, bronze medalist(s)	152
4	Barbara Dipayen (NCL)	A	47	49	50	4	58	~~60~~	60	4	110

=== Women's 59 kg ===
Rank	Athlete	Group	Snatch (kg)				Clean & Jerk (kg)				Total
Rank	Athlete	Group	1	2	3	Rank	1	2	3	Rank	Total
1st place, gold medalist(s)	Erika Yamasaki (AUS)	A	80	~~83~~	~~83~~	1st place, gold medalist(s)	97	100	103	1st place, gold medalist(s)	183
2nd place, silver medalist(s)	Jenly Tegu Wini (SOL)	A	75	79	~~82~~	2nd place, silver medalist(s)	99	~~102~~	102	2nd place, silver medalist(s)	181
3rd place, bronze medalist(s)	Seen Lee (AUS)	A	74	78	~~80~~	3rd place, bronze medalist(s)	90	95	101	3rd place, bronze medalist(s)	179
4	Sekolasitika Isaia (SAM)	A	65	69	71	4	85	89	91	5	162
5	Bernada Uepa (NRU)	B	~~65~~	65	68	6	82	87	92	4	160
6	Dayanara Calma (GUM)	A	65	~~68~~	70	5	85	~~88~~	~~91~~	6	155
7	Lusiana Kato (FIJ)	B	~~62~~	62	~~66~~	8	76	78	81	7	143
8	Betty Waneasi (SOL)	B	57	62	~~65~~	7	72	76	~~78~~	9	138
9	Adi Wini Mekula (FIJ)	B	58	~~60~~	60	9	73	77	~~79~~	8	137

=== Women's 64 kg ===
Rank	Athlete	Group	Snatch (kg)				Clean & Jerk (kg)				Total
Rank	Athlete	Group	1	2	3	Rank	1	2	3	Rank	Total
1st place, gold medalist(s)	Kiana Elliott (AUS)	A	93	97	99	1st place, gold medalist(s)	110	114	~~116~~	1st place, gold medalist(s)	213
2nd place, silver medalist(s)	Sarah Cochrane (AUS)	A	88	92	~~96~~	2nd place, silver medalist(s)	108	~~112~~	112	3rd place, bronze medalist(s)	204
3rd place, bronze medalist(s)	Megan Signal (NZL)	A	~~88~~	89	~~92~~	3rd place, bronze medalist(s)	111	114	~~116~~	2nd place, silver medalist(s)	203
4	Nancy Genzel Abouke (NRU)	A	80	~~86~~	~~86~~	4	105	110	~~113~~	4	190
5	Rebecca Audrey Johns (FIJ)	A	65	68	71	5	82	~~86~~	~~86~~	5	153
6	Armie Almazan (GUM)	A	65	68	~~71~~	6	75	~~80~~	~~80~~	8	143
7	Lalmah Sifi (SOL)	A	63	~~67~~	~~67~~	7	75	78	~~81~~	7	141
8	Rolin Beebe (KIR)	A	55	60	~~66~~	8	74	79	~~85~~	6	139

=== Women's 71 kg ===
Rank	Athlete	Group	Snatch (kg)				Clean & Jerk (kg)				Total
Rank	Athlete	Group	1	2	3	Rank	1	2	3	Rank	Total
1st place, gold medalist(s)	Maximina Uepa (NRU)	A	81	85	86	2nd place, silver medalist(s)	~~105~~	105	~~110~~	1st place, gold medalist(s)	191
2nd place, silver medalist(s)	Tiiau Bakaekiri (KIR)	A	75	~~78~~	78	4	96	101	~~106~~	2nd place, silver medalist(s)	179
3rd place, bronze medalist(s)	Sandra Ako (PNG)	A	70	75	80	3rd place, bronze medalist(s)	93	98	~~103~~	3	178
4	Saofaialo Jim (SAM)	A	66	~~70~~	~~70~~	5	85	~~90~~	90	4	156
—	Ebony Gorincu (AUS)	A	87	91	~~94~~	1st place, gold medalist(s)	~~110~~	~~110~~	~~110~~	—	—

=== Women's 76 kg ===
Rank	Athlete	Group	Snatch (kg)				Clean & Jerk (kg)				Total
Rank	Athlete	Group	1	2	3	Rank	1	2	3	Rank	Total
1st place, gold medalist(s)	Kanah Andrews-Nahu (NZL)	A	90	94	~~100~~	1st place, gold medalist(s)	110	~~112~~	112	1st place, gold medalist(s)	206
2nd place, silver medalist(s)	Bailey Rogers (NZL)	A	87	90	92	2nd place, silver medalist(s)	106	~~109~~	110	3rd place, bronze medalist(s)	202
3rd place, bronze medalist(s)	Stephanie Davies (AUS)	A	~~82~~	82	85	3rd place, bronze medalist(s)	104	109	111	2nd place, silver medalist(s)	196
4	Jaquilla Mau (NRU)	A	67	70	73	4	90	95	~~100~~	4	168
5	Taobuti Narewi (KIR)	A	~~50~~	50	55	5	66	70	~~73~~	5	125

=== Women's 81 kg ===
Rank	Athlete	Group	Snatch (kg)				Clean & Jerk (kg)				Total
Rank	Athlete	Group	1	2	3	Rank	1	2	3	Rank	Total
1st place, gold medalist(s)	Leotina Petelo (SAM)	A	85	89	~~92~~	1st place, gold medalist(s)	105	110	~~114~~	1st place, gold medalist(s)	199
2nd place, silver medalist(s)	Noi Igo (PNG)	A	70	~~75~~	~~75~~	3rd place, bronze medalist(s)	89	94	~~100~~	2nd place, silver medalist(s)	164
3rd place, bronze medalist(s)	Ariana Uepa (NRU)	A	68	71	~~74~~	2nd place, silver medalist(s)	87	91	~~95~~	3rd place, bronze medalist(s)	162
4	Matanoko McDonald (COK)	A	64	~~67~~	67	4	88	~~93~~	~~93~~	4	155
5	J-La Jojay Agir (NRU)	A	~~66~~	66	~~69~~	5	83	87	~~90~~	5	153
6	Merewalesi Vusonitokalau (FIJ)	A	~~60~~	60	~~65~~	6	80	~~85~~	~~85~~	6	140
—	Tiibeti Taekiti (KIR)	A	~~65~~	~~68~~	~~68~~	—	~~75~~	75	~~80~~	7	—

=== Women's 87 kg ===
Rank	Athlete	Group	Snatch (kg)				Clean & Jerk (kg)				Total
Rank	Athlete	Group	1	2	3	Rank	1	2	3	Rank	Total
1st place, gold medalist(s)	Kaity Fassina (AUS)	A	~~96~~	96	101	1st place, gold medalist(s)	113	119	~~122~~	1st place, gold medalist(s)	220
2nd place, silver medalist(s)	Lorraine Harry (PNG)	A	80	85	~~89~~	3rd place, bronze medalist(s)	107	~~112~~	~~112~~	2nd place, silver medalist(s)	192
3rd place, bronze medalist(s)	Tiaterenga Kaua (KIR)	A	70	75	~~81~~	4	~~90~~	~~90~~	90	5	165
4	Loto Pereira (SAM)	A	65	70	73	5	85	90	~~94~~	4	163
5	Roviel Detenamo (NRU)	A	~~70~~	~~70~~	70	6	~~88~~	88	93	3rd place, bronze medalist(s)	163
—	Hayley Whiting (NZL)	A	86	90	94	2nd place, silver medalist(s)	~~108~~	~~108~~	~~108~~	—	—

=== Women's +87 kg ===
Rank	Athlete	Group	Snatch (kg)				Clean & Jerk (kg)				Total
Rank	Athlete	Group	1	2	3	Rank	1	2	3	Rank	Total
1st place, gold medalist(s)	Laurel Hubbard (NZL)	A	112	118	125	1st place, gold medalist(s)	133	143	~~148~~	2nd place, silver medalist(s)	268
2nd place, silver medalist(s)	Feagaiga Stowers (SAM)	A	113	119	~~126~~	2nd place, silver medalist(s)	142	~~147~~	~~150~~	3rd place, bronze medalist(s)	261
3rd place, bronze medalist(s)	Iuniarra Sipaia (SAM)	A	103	104	108	4	142	~~147~~	147	1st place, gold medalist(s)	255
4	Charisma Amoe-Tarrant (NRU)	A	100	105	109	3rd place, bronze medalist(s)	137	~~143~~	~~144~~	4	246
5	Mamuel Mwareow (NRU)	A	80	~~85~~	~~85~~	6	105	111	~~115~~	5	191
6	Helen Anastasia Seipua (FIJ)	A	55	60	65	7	80	85	~~90~~	6	150
—	Kuinini Manumua (TGA)	A	94	98	~~101~~	5	~~111~~	~~111~~	~~111~~	—	—
