= List of Oceanian records in Olympic weightlifting =

3 The following are the Oceanian records in Olympic weightlifting. Records are maintained in each weight class for the snatch lift, clean and jerk lift, and the total for both lifts by the Oceania Weightlifting Federation (OWF).

== Current records ==
Key to tables: Awaiting ratification Not ratified or later rescinded by OWF

=== Men ===
Event	Record	Athlete	Nation	Date	Meet	Place	Ref
60 kg
Snatch	115 kg	OWF Standard					
Clean & Jerk	150 kg	OWF Standard					
Total	265 kg	OWF Standard					
65 kg
Snatch	127 kg	Morea Baru	Papua New Guinea	25 August 2025	Commonwealth Championships	Ahmedabad, India	
Clean & Jerk	165 kg	Morea Baru	Papua New Guinea	25 August 2025	Commonwealth Championships	Ahmedabad, India	
Total	292 kg	Morea Baru	Papua New Guinea	25 August 2025	Commonwealth Championships	Ahmedabad, India	
70 kg
Snatch	130 kg	OWF Standard					
Clean & Jerk	170 kg	OWF Standard					
Total	300 kg	OWF Standard					
75 kg
Snatch	135 kg	OWF Standard					
Snatch	140 kg	Ezekiel Moses	Nauru	30 October 2026	World Championships	Ningbo, China	
Clean & Jerk	175 kg	OWF Standard					
Total	310 kg	OWF Standard					
85 kg
Snatch	142 kg	OWF Standard					
Snatch	145 kg	Cameron McTaggart	New Zealand	2 November 2026	World Championships	Ningbo, China	
Clean & Jerk	180 kg	OWF Standard					
Total	322 kg	OWF Standard					
95 kg
Snatch	150 kg	OWF Standard					
Clean & Jerk	185 kg	OWF Standard					
Total	335 kg	OWF Standard					
110 kg
Snatch	171 kg	Taniela Rainibogi	Fiji	20 September 2026	Oceania Cup	Hawthorn, Australia	
Snatch	173 kg	Taniela Rainibogi	Fiji	1 May 2026	Oceania Championships	Apia, Samoa	
Clean & Jerk	207 kg	Jack Opeloge	Samoa	13 April 2025	Oceania Cup	Hawthorn, Australia	
Clean & Jerk	214 kg	Jack Opeloge	Samoa	1 May 2026	Oceania Championships	Apia, Samoa	
Total	371 kg	Taniela Rainibogi	Fiji	20 September 2026	Oceania Cup	Hawthorn, Australia	
Total	374 kg	Jack Opeloge	Samoa	1 May 2026	Oceania Championships	Apia, Samoa	
Total	378 kg	Taniela Rainibogi	Fiji	30 July 2026	Commonwealth Games	Glasgow, United Kingdom	
+110 kg
Snatch	182 kg	Sanele Mao	Samoa	16 November 2025		Hawthorn, Australia	
Snatch	185 kg	Sanele Mao	Samoa	1 May 2026	Oceania Championships	Apia, Samoa	
Clean & Jerk	220 kg	Sanele Mao	Samoa	13 April 2025	Oceania Cup	Hawthorn, Australia	
Clean & Jerk	225 kg	Sanele Mao	Samoa	1 May 2026	Oceania Championships	Apia, Samoa	
Total	402 kg	Sanele Mao	Samoa	16 November 2025		Hawthorn, Australia	
Total	410 kg	Sanele Mao	Samoa	1 May 2026	Oceania Championships	Apia, Samoa	

=== Women ===
Event	Record	Athlete	Nation	Date	Meet	Place	Ref
49 kg
Snatch	70 kg	OWF Standard					
Clean & Jerk	95 kg	OWF Standard					
Total	165 kg	OWF Standard					
53 kg
Snatch	80 kg	OWF Standard					
Clean & Jerk	100 kg	OWF Standard					
Total	180 kg	OWF Standard					
57 kg
Snatch	95 kg	OWF Standard					
Clean & Jerk	110 kg	OWF Standard					
Total	195 kg	OWF Standard					
61 kg
Snatch	98 kg	OWF Standard					
Clean & Jerk	118 kg	OWF Standard					
Total	213 kg	OWF Standard					
69 kg
Snatch	103 kg	Olivia Selemaia	New Zealand	12 April 2025	Oceania Junior Championships	Hawthorn, Australia	
Clean & Jerk	123 kg	Olivia Selemaia	New Zealand	28 August 2025	Commonwealth Championships	Ahmedabad, India	
Clean & Jerk	124 kg	Olivia Selemaia	New Zealand	7 October 2025	World Championships	Førde, Norway	
Total	223 kg	Olivia Selemaia	New Zealand	12 April 2025	Oceania Junior Championships	Hawthorn, Australia	
Total	226 kg	Olivia Selemaia	New Zealand	7 October 2025	World Championships	Førde, Norway	
77 kg
Snatch	107 kg	Seine Stowers	Samoa	16 November 2025		Hawthorn, Australia	
Snatch	112 kg	Seine Stowers	Samoa	30 April 2026	Oceania Championships	Apia, Samoa	
Clean & Jerk	137 kg	Seine Stowers	Samoa	16 November 2025		Hawthorn, Australia	
Clean & Jerk	142 kg	Seine Stowers	Samoa	30 April 2026	Oceania Championships	Apia, Samoa	
Total	244 kg	Seine Stowers	Samoa	16 November 2025		Hawthorn, Australia	
Total	254 kg	Seine Stowers	Samoa	30 April 2026	Oceania Championships	Apia, Samoa	
86 kg
Snatch	115 kg	Eileen Cikamatana	Australia	4 July 2025	Pacific Mini Games	Meyuns, Palau	
Clean & Jerk	148 kg	Eileen Cikamatana	Australia	13 April 2025	Oceania Cup	Hawthorn, Australia	
Total	260 kg	Eileen Cikamatana	Australia	13 April 2025	Oceania Cup	Hawthorn, Australia	
+86 kg
Snatch	111 kg	Lesila Fiapule	Samoa	13 April 2025	Oceania Cup	Hawthorn, Australia	
Snatch	113 kg	Tui-Alofa Patolo	New Zealand	1 May 2026	Oceania Championships	Apia, Samoa	
Clean & Jerk	150 kg	Iuniarra Sipaia	Samoa	13 April 2025	Oceania Cup	Hawthorn, Australia	
Clean & Jerk	151 kg	Iuniarra Sipaia	Samoa	1 May 2026	Oceania Championships	Apia, Samoa	
Total	261 kg	Iuniarra Sipaia	Samoa	30 August 2025	Commonwealth Championships	Ahmedabad, India	

== Historical records ==
=== Men (2025–2026) ===
Event	Record	Athlete	Nation	Date	Meet	Place	Ref
71 kg
Snatch	135 kg	John Tafi	Samoa	13 April 2025	Oceania Cup	Hawthorn, Australia	
Snatch	136 kg	John Tafi	Samoa	3 July 2025	Pacific Mini Games	Meyuns, Palau	
Snatch	140 kg	John Tafi	Samoa	28 April 2026	Oceania Championships	Apia, Samoa	
Snatch	142 kg	John Tafi	Samoa	27 July 2026	Commonwealth Games	Glasgow, United Kingdom	
Clean & Jerk	166 kg	John Tafi	Samoa	13 April 2025	Oceania Cup	Hawthorn, Australia	
Clean & Jerk	169 kg	John Tafi	Samoa	3 July 2025	Pacific Mini Games	Meyuns, Palau	
Clean & Jerk	171 kg	John Tafi	Samoa	28 April 2026	Oceania Championships	Apia, Samoa	
Clean & Jerk	172 kg	John Tafi	Samoa	27 July 2026	Commonwealth Games	Glasgow, United Kingdom	
Total	301 kg	John Tafi	Samoa	13 April 2025	Oceania Cup	Hawthorn, Australia	
Total	305 kg	John Tafi	Samoa	3 July 2025	Pacific Mini Games	Meyuns, Palau	
Total	311 kg	John Tafi	Samoa	28 April 2026	Oceania Championships	Apia, Samoa	
Total	314 kg	John Tafi	Samoa	27 July 2026	Commonwealth Games	Glasgow, United Kingdom	
79 kg
Snatch	135 kg	OWF Standard					
Clean & Jerk	175 kg	Ezekiel Moses	Nauru	13 April 2025	Oceania Cup	Hawthorn, Australia	
Total	305 kg	Ezekiel Moses	Nauru	13 April 2025	Oceania Cup	Hawthorn, Australia	
88 kg
Snatch	142 kg	Nehemiah Elder	Fiji	11 April 2025	Oceania Youth Championships	Hawthorn, Australia	
Snatch	148 kg	Cameron McTaggart	New Zealand	28 August 2025	Commonwealth Championships	Ahmedabad, India	
Snatch	155 kg	Nehemiah Elder	Fiji	4 July 2025	Pacific Mini Games	Meyuns, Palau	
Clean & Jerk	180 kg	OWF Standard					
Clean & Jerk	185 kg	Cameron McTaggart	New Zealand	29 April 2026	Oceania Championships	Apia, Samoa	
Total	320 kg	OWF Standard					
Total	325 kg	Cameron McTaggart	New Zealand	28 August 2025	Commonwealth Championships	Ahmedabad, India	
Total	326 kg	Cameron McTaggart	New Zealand	7 October 2025	World Championships	Førde, Norway	
Total	339 kg	Cameron McTaggart	New Zealand	29 April 2026	Oceania Championships	Apia, Samoa	
94 kg
Snatch	157 kg	Oliver Saxton	Australia	30 April 2026	Oceania Championships	Apia, Samoa	
Clean & Jerk	188 kg	Oliver Saxton	Australia	30 April 2026	Oceania Championships	Apia, Samoa	
Total	345 kg	Oliver Saxton	Australia	30 April 2026	Oceania Championships	Apia, Samoa	

=== Men (2018–2024) ===
Event	Record	Athlete	Nation	Date	Meet	Place	Ref
55 kg
Snatch	110 kg	OWF Standard					
Clean & Jerk	137 kg	OWF Standard					
Total	241 kg	OWF Standard					
61 kg
Snatch	124 kg	Morea Baru	Papua New Guinea	7 February 2019	EGAT Cup	Chiang Mai, Thailand	
Clean & Jerk	163 kg	Morea Baru	Papua New Guinea	27 April 2019	Arafura Games	Darwin, Australia	
Total	284 kg	Morea Baru	Papua New Guinea	10 July 2019	Pacific Games	Apia, Samoa	
67 kg
Snatch	127 kg	Vaipava Ioane	Samoa	24 September 2021		Apia, Samoa	
Clean & Jerk	166 kg	Vaipava Ioane	Samoa	21 November 2023	Pacific Games	Honiara, Solomon Islands	
Clean & Jerk	166 kg	Vaipava Ioane	Samoa	31 July 2022	Commonwealth Games	Marston Green, United Kingdom	
Total	289 kg	Vaipava Ioane	Samoa	11 July 2019	Pacific Games	Apia, Samoa	
Total	293 kg	Vaipava Ioane	Samoa	31 July 2022	Commonwealth Games	Marston Green, United Kingdom	
73 kg
Snatch	136 kg	John Tafi	Samoa	21 November 2023	Pacific Games	Honiara, Solomon Islands	
Clean & Jerk	168 kg	John Tafi	Samoa	26 May 2023		Apia, Samoa	
Clean & Jerk	170 kg	John Tafi	Samoa	22 February 2024	Oceania Championships	Auckland, New Zealand	
Total	303 kg	John Tafi	Samoa	26 May 2023		Apia, Samoa	
81 kg
Snatch	143 kg	Kyle Bruce	Australia	1 August 2022	Commonwealth Games	Marston Green, Great Britain	
Snatch	144 kg	Ryley Porter	Australia	10 October 2020	Queensland Championships	Chandler, Australia	
Snatch	149 kg	Kyle Bruce	Australia	23 October 2021	AWF WWC Squad Invitational Competition		
Clean & Jerk	180 kg	Kyle Bruce	Australia	1 August 2022	Commonwealth Games	Marston Green, Great Britain	
Clean & Jerk	182 kg	Kyle Bruce	Australia	23 October 2021	AWF WWC Squad Invitational Competition		
Total	323 kg	Kyle Bruce	Australia	1 August 2022	Commonwealth Games	Marston Green, Great Britain	
Total	331 kg	Kyle Bruce	Australia	23 October 2021	AWF WWC Squad Invitational Competition		
89 kg
Snatch	156 kg	Don Opeloge	Samoa	29 April 2019	Arafura Games	Darwin, Australia	
Clean & Jerk	198 kg	Don Opeloge	Samoa	4 June 2019	Junior World Championships	Suva, Fiji	
Total	349 kg	Don Opeloge	Samoa	4 June 2019	Junior World Championships	Suva, Fiji	
96 kg
Snatch	171 kg	Don Opeloge	Samoa	2 August 2022	Commonwealth Games	Marston Green, Great Britain	
Clean & Jerk	210 kg	Don Opeloge	Samoa	29 February 2020	Australian Open	Canberra, Australia	
Total	381 kg	Don Opeloge	Samoa	2 August 2022	Commonwealth Games	Marston Green, Great Britain	
102 kg
Snatch	172 kg	Don Opeloge	Samoa	15 July 2023	Commonwealth Championships	Greater Noida, India	
Snatch	175 kg	Don Opeloge	Samoa	24 February 2024	Oceania Championships	Auckland, New Zealand	
Clean & Jerk	216 kg	Don Opeloge	Samoa	13 December 2023	IWF Grand Prix	Doha, Qatar	
Clean & Jerk	221 kg	Don Opeloge	Samoa	8 April 2024	World Cup	Phuket, Thailand	
Total	386 kg	Don Opeloge	Samoa	14 September 2023	World Championships	Riyadh, Saudi Arabia	
Total	390 kg	Don Opeloge	Samoa	24 February 2024	Oceania Championships	Auckland, New Zealand	
Total	391 kg	Don Opeloge	Samoa	8 April 2024	World Cup	Phuket, Thailand	
109 kg
Snatch	170 kg	Taniela Rainibogi	Fiji	14 December 2023	IWF Grand Prix	Doha, Qatar	
Clean & Jerk	210 kg	Taniela Rainibogi	Fiji	14 December 2023	IWF Grand Prix	Doha, Qatar	
Total	380 kg	Taniela Rainibogi	Fiji	14 December 2023	IWF Grand Prix	Doha, Qatar	
+109 kg
Snatch	182 kg	David Liti	New Zealand	15 November 2020	New Zealand Championships	Tauranga, New Zealand	
Clean & Jerk	236 kg	David Liti	New Zealand	4 August 2021	Olympic Games	Tokyo, Japan	
Total	414 kg	David Liti	New Zealand	15 November 2020	New Zealand Championships	Tauranga, New Zealand	
Total	415 kg	David Liti	New Zealand	10 August 2024	Olympic Games	Paris, France	

=== Men (1998–2018) ===
Event	Record	Athlete	Nation	Date	Meet	Place	Ref
–56 kg
Snatch	124 kg	Manuel Minginfel	Federated States of Micronesia	27 August 2007	Pacific Games	Apia, Samoa	
Clean & Jerk	152 kg	Manuel Minginfel	Federated States of Micronesia	27 August 2007	Pacific Games	Apia, Samoa	
Total	276 kg	Manuel Minginfel	Federated States of Micronesia	27 August 2007	Pacific Games	Apia, Samoa	
–62 kg
Snatch	129 kg	Manuel Minginfel	Federated States of Micronesia	9 December 2006		Apia, Samoa	
Clean & Jerk	172 kg	Marcus Stephen	Nauru	23 November 1999	World Championships	Athens, Greece	
Total	300 kg	Marcus Stephen	Nauru	23 November 1999	World Championships	Athens, Greece	
–69 kg
Snatch	135 kg	Yukio Peter	Nauru	18 August 2004	Olympic Games	Athens, Greece	
Clean & Jerk	175 kg	Marcus Stephen	Nauru	6 November 1999		Nauru	
Total	302 kg	Yukio Peter	Nauru	6 May 2004	Oceania Championships	Suva, Fiji	
–77 kg
Snatch	157 kg	Yukio Peter	Nauru	12 May 2011	Oceania Championships	Darwin, Australia	
Clean & Jerk	196 kg	Yukio Peter	Nauru	14 May 2009	Oceania Championships	Darwin, Australia	
Total	350 kg	Yukio Peter	Nauru	9 September 2005		Sigatoka, Fiji	
–85 kg
Snatch	182 kg	Sergo Chakhoyan	Australia	27 September 2003	Russian Grand Prix	Moscow, Russia	
Clean & Jerk	210 kg	Sergo Chakhoyan	Australia	27 September 2003	Russian Grand Prix	Moscow, Russia	
Total	392 kg	Sergo Chakhoyan	Australia	27 September 2003	Russian Grand Prix	Moscow, Russia	
–94 kg
Snatch	182 kg	Aleksander Karapetyan	Australia	9 November 2001	World Championships	Antalya, Turkey	
Clean & Jerk	216 kg	Steven Kari	Papua New Guinea	8 April 2018	Commonwealth Games	Gold Coast, Australia	
Total	392 kg	Aleksander Karapetyan	Australia	9 November 2001	World Championships	Antalya, Turkey	
–105 kg
Snatch	175 kg	Aleksander Karapetyan	Australia	30 October 2004	Mermet Cup	Melbourne, Australia	
Clean & Jerk	210 kg	Aleksander Karapetyan	Australia	17 March 2002	Mermet Cup	Melbourne, Australia	
Total	377 kg	Aleksander Karapetyan	Australia	17 March 2002	Mermet Cup	Melbourne, Australia	
+105 kg
Snatch	184 kg	Itte Detenamo	Nauru	13 May 2011	Oceania Championships	Darwin, Australia	
Clean & Jerk	229 kg	Itte Detenamo	Nauru	13 May 2011	Oceania Championships	Darwin, Australia	
Total	413 kg	Itte Detenamo	Nauru	13 May 2011	Oceania Championships	Darwin, Australia	

=== Women (2025–2026) ===
Event	Record	Athlete	Nation	Date	Meet	Place	Ref
48 kg
Snatch	70 kg	OWF Standard					
Snatch	71 kg	Jo-Beth Deireragea	Nauru	27 April 2026	Oceania Championships	Apia, Samoa	
Clean & Jerk	100 kg	OWF Standard					
Total	170 kg	OWF Standard					
58 kg
Snatch	85 kg	OWF Standard					
Snatch	100 kg	Kiana Elliott	Australia	26 August 2025	Commonwealth Championships	Ahmedabad, India	
Clean & Jerk	105 kg	OWF Standard					
Clean & Jerk	108 kg	Brenna Kean	Australia	2 July 2025	Pacific Mini Games	Meyuns, Palau	
Clean & Jerk	112 kg	Kiana Elliott	Australia	26 August 2025	Commonwealth Championships	Ahmedabad, India	
Total	190 kg	OWF Standard					
Total	212 kg	Kiana Elliott	Australia	26 August 2025	Commonwealth Championships	Ahmedabad, India	
63 kg
Snatch	95 kg	Kiana Elliott	Australia	13 April 2025	Oceania Cup	Hawthorn, Australia	
Snatch	98 kg	Kiana Elliott	Australia	3 July 2025	Pacific Mini Games	Meyuns, Palau	
Snatch	101 kg	Femily-Crystie Notte	Nauru	29 April 2026	Oceania Championships	Apia, Samoa	
Clean & Jerk	118 kg	Zoe Pukekura	Australia	13 April 2025	Oceania Cup	Hawthorn, Australia	
Clean & Jerk	123 kg	Femily-Crystie Notte	Nauru	29 April 2026	Oceania Championships	Apia, Samoa	
Total	210 kg	Zoe Pukekura	Australia	13 April 2025	Oceania Cup	Hawthorn, Australia	
Total	213 kg	Kiana Elliott	Australia	3 July 2025	Pacific Mini Games	Meyuns, Palau	
Total	224 kg	Femily-Crystie Notte	Nauru	29 April 2026	Oceania Championships	Apia, Samoa	

=== Women (2018–2024) ===
Event	Record	Athlete	Nation	Date	Meet	Place	Ref
45 kg
Snatch	69 kg	OWF Standard					
Clean & Jerk	87 kg	OWF Standard					
Total	155 kg	OWF Standard					
49 kg
Snatch	78 kg	Dika Toua	Papua New Guinea	15 December 2018	Pacific Cup	Le Mont-Dore, New Caledonia	
Clean & Jerk	107 kg	Dika Toua	Papua New Guinea	15 December 2018	Pacific Cup	Le Mont-Dore, New Caledonia	
Total	185 kg	Dika Toua	Papua New Guinea	15 December 2018	Pacific Cup	Le Mont-Dore, New Caledonia	
55 kg
Snatch	84 kg	Jenly Tegu Wini	Solomon Islands	20 June 2022	Pacific Mini Games	Saipan, Northern Mariana Islands	
Clean & Jerk	110 kg	Jenly Tegu Wini	Solomon Islands	20 June 2022	Pacific Mini Games	Saipan, Northern Mariana Islands	
Total	194 kg	Jenly Tegu Wini	Solomon Islands	20 June 2022	Pacific Mini Games	Saipan, Northern Mariana Islands	
59 kg
Snatch	96 kg	Kiana Elliott	Australia	8 December 2023	IWF Grand Prix	Doha, Qatar	
Snatch	98 kg	Mathlynn Sasser	Marshall Islands	22 February 2024	Oceania Championships	Auckland, New Zealand	
Snatch	99 kg	Mathlynn Sasser	Marshall Islands	3 April 2024	World Cup	Phuket, Thailand	
Clean & Jerk	120 kg	Mathlynn Sasser	Marshall Islands	10 June 2023	IWF Grand Prix	Havana, Cuba	
Total	214 kg	Mathlynn Sasser	Marshall Islands	10 June 2023	IWF Grand Prix	Havana, Cuba	
Total	216 kg	Mathlynn Sasser	Marshall Islands	3 April 2024	World Cup	Phuket, Thailand	
64 kg
Snatch	101 kg	Kiana Elliott	Australia	27 July 2021	Olympic Games	Tokyo, Japan	
Clean & Jerk	120 kg	Sarah Cochrane	Australia	September 2021	Oceania Championships		
Total	220 kg	Sarah Cochrane	Australia	September 2021	Oceania Championships		
71 kg
Snatch	101 kg	Sarah Cochrane	Australia	20 May 2023	Queensland Championships	Townsville, Australia	
Clean & Jerk	122 kg	Jacqueline Nichele	Australia	14 July 2023	Commonwealth Championships	Greater Noida, India	
Total	221 kg	Sarah Cochrane	Australia	20 May 2023	Queensland Championships	Townsville, Australia	
76 kg
Snatch	98 kg	Kanah Andrews-Nahu	New Zealand	5 June 2019	Junior World Championships	Suva, Fiji	
Clean & Jerk	122 kg	OWF Standard					
Clean & Jerk	122 kg	Olivia Kelly	Australia	23 October 2022	Queensland Championships	Chandler, Australia	
Total	218 kg	OWF Standard					
Total	219 kg	Olivia Kelly	Australia	23 October 2022	Queensland Championships	Chandler, Australia	
81 kg
Snatch	115 kg	Eileen Cikamatana	Australia	30 January 2020	World Cup	Rome, Italy	
Snatch	118 kg	Eileen Cikamatana	Australia	18 May 2019	ACT vs NSW	Sydney, Australia	
Clean & Jerk	150 kg	Eileen Cikamatana	Australia	12 December 2019	IWF World Cup	Tianjin, China	
Total	261 kg	Eileen Cikamatana	Australia	13 December 2023	IWF Grand Prix	Doha, Qatar	
Total	263 kg	Eileen Cikamatana	Australia	9 April 2024	World Cup	Phuket, Thailand	
Total	268 kg	Eileen Cikamatana	Australia	18 May 2019	ACT vs NSW	Sydney, Australia	
87 kg
Snatch	115 kg	Eileen Cikamatana	Australia	10 November 2019	IWF Grand Prix ODESUR CSLP	Lima, Peru	
Clean & Jerk	151 kg	Eileen Cikamatana	Australia	10 November 2019	IWF Grand Prix ODESUR CSLP	Lima, Peru	
Total	266 kg	Eileen Cikamatana	Australia	10 November 2019	IWF Grand Prix ODESUR CSLP	Lima, Peru	
+87 kg
Snatch	133 kg	Laurel Hubbard	New Zealand	1 March 2020	Australian Open	Canberra, Australia	
Clean & Jerk	158 kg	Feagaiga Stowers	Samoa	26 November 2022	New Zealand Championships	Auckland, New Zealand	
Total	285 kg	Laurel Hubbard	New Zealand	27 September 2019	World Championships	Pattaya, Thailand	

=== Women (1998–2018) ===
Event	Record	Athlete	Nation	Date	Meet	Place	Ref
–48 kg
Snatch	75 kg	Thelma Toua	Papua New Guinea	17 December 2016	Pacific Cup	Le Mont-Dore, New Caledonia	
Clean & Jerk	93 kg	Thelma Toua	Papua New Guinea	17 March 2017	Australian Commonwealth Games Qualification Event	Melbourne, Australia	
Total	167 kg	Thelma Toua	Papua New Guinea	17 December 2016	Pacific Cup	Le Mont-Dore, New Caledonia	
–53 kg
Snatch	87 kg	Dika Toua	Papua New Guinea	23 May 2008		Noumea, New Caledonia	
Clean & Jerk	114 kg	Dika Toua	Papua New Guinea	9 September 2005		Sigatoka, Fiji	
Total	200 kg	Dika Toua	Papua New Guinea	9 September 2005		Sigatoka, Fiji	
–58 kg
Snatch	96 kg	Seen Lee	Australia	20 December 2008	Hawthorn Club Championships	Hawthorn, Australia	
Clean & Jerk	114 kg	Mathlynn Sasser	Marshall Islands	25 May 2016	Oceania Championships	Suva, Fiji	
Total	208 kg	Seen Lee	Australia	20 December 2008	Hawthorn Club Championships	Hawthorn, Australia	
–63 kg
Snatch	96 kg	Mathlynn Sasser	Marshall Islands	5 December 2017	Pacific Mini Games	Port Vila, Vanuatu	
Clean & Jerk	123 kg	Mathlynn Sasser	Marshall Islands	5 December 2017	Pacific Mini Games	Port Vila, Vanuatu	
Total	219 kg	Mathlynn Sasser	Marshall Islands	5 December 2017	Pacific Mini Games	Port Vila, Vanuatu	
–69 kg
Snatch	105 kg	Apolonia Vaivai	Fiji	22 September 2017	Asian Indoor and Martial Arts Games	Ashgabat, Turkmenistan	
Clean & Jerk	126 kg	Apolonia Vaivai	Fiji	9 September 2017	Oceania Championships	Gold Coast, Australia	
Total	227 kg	Apolonia Vaivai	Fiji	9 September 2017	Oceania Championships	Gold Coast, Australia	
–75 kg
Snatch	111 kg	Mary Opeloge	Samoa	7 December 2012	Samoan Championships	Tuanaimato, Samoa	
Clean & Jerk	135 kg	Mary Opeloge	Samoa	7 December 2012	Samoan Championships	Tuanaimato, Samoa	
Total	246 kg	Mary Opeloge	Samoa	7 December 2012	Samoan Championships	Tuanaimato, Samoa	
–90 kg
Snatch	111 kg	Eileen Cikamatana	Fiji	24 September 2017	Asian Indoor and Martial Arts Games	Ashgabat, Turkmenistan	
Clean & Jerk	143 kg	Eileen Cikamatana	Fiji	7 December 2017	Pacific Mini Games	Port Vila, Vanuatu	
Total	253 kg	Eileen Cikamatana	Fiji	24 September 2017	Asian Indoor and Martial Arts Games	Ashgabat, Turkmenistan	
+90 kg
Snatch	131 kg	Laurel Hubbard	New Zealand	11 June 2017	North Island Championships	Papatoetoe, New Zealand	
Clean & Jerk	161 kg	Ele Opeloge	Samoa	7 September 2011	Pacific Games	Noumea, New Caledonia	
Total	285 kg	Ele Opeloge	Samoa	10 October 2010	Commonwealth Games	New Delhi, India	
