= List of Samoan records in Olympic weightlifting =

The following are the national records in Olympic weightlifting in Samoa. Records are maintained in each weight class for the snatch lift, clean and jerk lift, and the total for both lifts by the Samoa Weightlifting Federation (SWF).

== Current records ==
=== Men ===
Event	Record	Athlete	Date	Meet	Place	Ref
60 kg
Snatch						
Clean & Jerk						
Total						
65 kg
Snatch						
Clean & Jerk						
Total						
71 kg
Snatch	142 kg	John Tafi	27 July 2026	Commonwealth Games	Glasgow, United Kingdom	
Clean & Jerk	172 kg	John Tafi	27 July 2026	Commonwealth Games	Glasgow, United Kingdom	
Total	314 kg	John Tafi	27 July 2026	Commonwealth Games	Glasgow, United Kingdom	
79 kg
Snatch	122 kg	Faitasia Seuao	29 April 2026	Oceania Championships	Apia, Samoa	
Clean & Jerk	162 kg	Faitasia Seuao	29 April 2026	Oceania Championships	Apia, Samoa	
Total	284 kg	Faitasia Seuao	29 April 2026	Oceania Championships	Apia, Samoa	
88 kg
Snatch	130 kg	Sione Sasa	30 April 2026	Oceania Championships	Apia, Samoa	
Clean & Jerk	161 kg	Sione Sasa	30 April 2026	Oceania Championships	Apia, Samoa	
Total	291 kg	Sione Sasa	30 April 2026	Oceania Championships	Apia, Samoa	
94 kg
Snatch	146 kg	Emmanuel Ulimasao	30 April 2026	Oceania Championships	Apia, Samoa	
Clean & Jerk	180 kg	Emmanuel Ulimasao	4 July 2025	Pacific Mini Games	Apia, Samoa	
Total	324 kg	Emmanuel Ulimasao	29 July 2026	Commonwealth Games	Glasgow, United Kingdom	
110 kg
Snatch	166 kg	Maeu Nanai Livi	13 April 2025	Oceania Cup	Hawthorn, Australia	
Clean & Jerk	214 kg	Jack Opeloge	1 May 2026	Oceania Championships	Apia, Samoa	
Total	374 kg	Jack Opeloge	1 May 2026	Oceania Championships	Apia, Samoa	
+110 kg
Snatch	185 kg	Sanele Mao	1 May 2026	Oceania Championships	Apia, Samoa	
Clean & Jerk	225 kg	Sanele Mao	1 May 2026	Oceania Championships	Apia, Samoa	
Total	410 kg	Sanele Mao	1 May 2026	Oceania Championships	Apia, Samoa	

=== Women ===
Event	Record	Athlete	Date	Meet	Place	Ref
48 kg
Snatch						
Clean & Jerk						
Total						
53 kg
Snatch						
Clean & Jerk						
Total						
58 kg
Snatch	82 kg	Anoni Faumui	27 July 2026	Commonwealth Games	Glasgow, United Kingdom	
Clean & Jerk	95 kg	Anoni Faumui	27 July 2026	Commonwealth Games	Glasgow, United Kingdom	
Total	177 kg	Anoni Faumui	27 July 2026	Commonwealth Games	Glasgow, United Kingdom	
63 kg
Snatch	83 kg	Anoni Faumui	29 April 2026	Oceania Championships	Apia, Samoa	
Clean & Jerk	103 kg	Anoni Faumui	29 April 2026	Oceania Championships	Apia, Samoa	
Total	186 kg	Anoni Faumui	29 April 2026	Oceania Championships	Apia, Samoa	
69 kg
Snatch						
Clean & Jerk						
Total						
77 kg
Snatch	112 kg	Seine Stowers	30 April 2026	Oceania Championships	Apia, Samoa	
Clean & Jerk	142 kg	Seine Stowers	30 April 2026	Oceania Championships	Apia, Samoa	
Total	254 kg	Seine Stowers	30 April 2026	Oceania Championships	Apia, Samoa	
86 kg
Snatch						
Clean & Jerk						
Total						
+86 kg
Snatch	111 kg	Lesila Fiapule	13 April 2025	Oceania Cup	Hawthorn, Australia	
Clean & Jerk	151 kg	Iuniarra Sipaia	1 May 2026	Oceania Championships	Apia, Samoa	
Total	261 kg	Iuniarra Sipaia	30 August 2025	Commonwealth Championships	Ahmedabad, India	

== Historical records ==
=== Men (2018–2025) ===
Event	Record	Athlete	Date	Meet	Place	Ref
55 kg
Snatch	kg					
Clean & Jerk	kg					
Total	kg					
61 kg
Snatch	95 kg	John Tafi	10 July 2019	Pacific Games	Apia, Samoa	
Clean & Jerk	115 kg	John Tafi	10 July 2019	Pacific Games	Apia, Samoa	
Total	210 kg	John Tafi	10 July 2019	Pacific Games	Apia, Samoa	
67 kg
Snatch	127 kg	Vaipava Ioane	24 September 2021		Apia, Samoa	
Clean & Jerk	166 kg	Vaipava Ioane	31 July 2022	Commonwealth Games	Marston Green, United Kingdom	
Total	293 kg	Vaipava Ioane	31 July 2022	Commonwealth Games	Marston Green, United Kingdom	
73 kg
Snatch	136 kg	John Tafi	21 November 2023	Pacific Games	Honiara, Solomon Islands	
Clean & Jerk	170 kg	John Tafi	22 February 2024	Oceania Championships	Auckland, New Zealand	
Total	303 kg	John Tafi	26 May 2023		Apia, Samoa	
81 kg
Snatch	138 kg	Jack Opeloge	July 2019	Pacific Games	Apia, Samoa	
Clean & Jerk	160 kg	Jack Opeloge	July 2019	Pacific Games	Apia, Samoa	
Total	298 kg	Jack Opeloge	July 2019	Pacific Games	Apia, Samoa	
89 kg
Snatch	156 kg	Don Opeloge	29 April 2019	Arafura Games	Darwin, Australia	
Clean & Jerk	198 kg	Don Opeloge	4 June 2019	Junior World Championships	Suva, Fiji	
Total	349 kg	Don Opeloge	4 June 2019	Junior World Championships	Suva, Fiji	
96 kg
Snatch	171 kg	Don Opeloge	2 August 2022	Commonwealth Games	Marston Green, United Kingdom	
Clean & Jerk	210 kg	Don Opeloge	29 February 2020	Australian Open	Canberra, Australia	
Total	381 kg	Don Opeloge	2 August 2022	Commonwealth Games	Marston Green, United Kingdom	
102 kg
Snatch	175 kg	Don Opeloge	24 February 2024	Oceania Championships	Auckland, New Zealand	
Clean & Jerk	221 kg	Don Opeloge	8 April 2024	World Cup	Phuket, Thailand	
Total	391 kg	Don Opeloge	8 April 2024	World Cup	Phuket, Thailand	
109 kg
Snatch	164 kg	Jack Opeloge	3 August 2022	Commonwealth Games	Marston Green, United Kingdom	
Clean & Jerk	206 kg	Sanele Mao	13 July 2019	Pacific Games	Apia, Samoa	
Total	366 kg	Sanele Mao	13 July 2019	Pacific Games	Apia, Samoa	
+109 kg
Snatch	180 kg	Sanele Mao	11 April 2024	World Cup	Phuket, Thailand	
Clean & Jerk	220 kg	Sanele Mao	24 November 2023	Pacific Games	Honiara, Solomon Islands	
Total	395 kg	Sanele Mao	24 November 2023	Pacific Games	Honiara, Solomon Islands	

=== Women (2018–2025) ===
Event	Record	Athlete	Date	Meet	Place	Ref
48 kg
Snatch						
Clean & Jerk						
Total						
53 kg
Snatch						
Clean & Jerk						
Total						
58 kg
Snatch						
Clean & Jerk						
Total						
63 kg
Snatch						
Clean & Jerk						
Total						
69 kg
Snatch						
Clean & Jerk						
Total						
77 kg
Snatch						
Clean & Jerk						
Total						
86 kg
Snatch						
Clean & Jerk						
Total						
+86 kg
Snatch						
Clean & Jerk						
Total						

=== Men (1998–2018) ===
Event	Record	Athlete	Date	Meet	Place	Ref
56 kg
Snatch						
Clean & Jerk						
Total						
62 kg
Snatch	120 kg					
Clean & Jerk	163 kg					
Total	283 kg					
69 kg
Snatch	130 kg	Vaipava Ioane	6 December 2017	Pacific Mini Games	Port Vila, Vanuatu	
Clean & Jerk	170 kg	Vaipava Ioane	20 September 2017	Asian Indoor and Martial Arts Games	Ashgabat, Turkmenistan	
Total	295 kg	Vaipava Ioane	20 September 2017	Asian Indoor and Martial Arts Games	Ashgabat, Turkmenistan	
77 kg
Snatch	127 kg					
Clean & Jerk	163 kg					
Total	290 kg					
85 kg
Snatch	151 kg	Don Opeloge	7 April 2018	Commonwealth Games	Gold Coast, Australia	
Clean & Jerk	182 kg					
Total	331 kg	Don Opeloge	7 April 2018	Commonwealth Games	Gold Coast, Australia	
94 kg
Snatch	156 kg	Siaosi Leuo	8 April 2018	Commonwealth Games	Gold Coast, Australia	
Clean & Jerk	186 kg					
Total	338 kg	Siaosi Leuo	7 December 2017	Pacific Mini Games	Port Vila, Vanuatu	
105 kg
Snatch	155 kg	Niusila Opeloge	8 June 2012		Apia, Samoa	
Clean & Jerk	206 kg	Sanele Mao	9 April 2018	Commonwealth Games	Gold Coast, Australia	
Total	360 kg	Sanele Mao	9 April 2018	Commonwealth Games	Gold Coast, Australia	
+105 kg
Snatch	180 kg	Lauititi Lui	25 September 2017	Asian Indoor and Martial Arts Games	Ashgabat, Turkmenistan	
Clean & Jerk	225 kg	Lauititi Lui	9 April 2018	Commonwealth Games	Gold Coast, Australia	
Total	400 kg	Lauititi Lui	9 April 2018	Commonwealth Games	Gold Coast, Australia	

=== Women (2018–2024) ===
Event	Record	Athlete	Date	Meet	Place	Ref
45 kg
Snatch	kg					
Clean & Jerk	kg					
Total	kg					
49 kg
Snatch	kg					
Clean & Jerk	kg					
Total	kg					
55 kg
Snatch	kg					
Clean & Jerk	kg					
Total	kg					
59 kg
Snatch	kg					
Clean & Jerk	kg					
Total	kg					
64 kg
Snatch	kg					
Clean & Jerk	kg					
Total	kg					
71 kg
Snatch	kg					
Clean & Jerk	kg					
Total	kg					
76 kg
Snatch	kg					
Clean & Jerk	kg					
Total	kg					
81 kg
Snatch	kg					
Clean & Jerk	kg					
Total	kg					
87 kg
Snatch	kg					
Clean & Jerk	kg					
Total	kg					
+87 kg
Snatch	121 kg	Feagaiga Stowers	3 August 2022	Commonwealth Games	Marston Green, United Kingdom	
Clean & Jerk	158 kg	Feagaiga Stowers	26 November 2022	New Zealand Championships	Auckland, New Zealand	
Total	275 kg	Feagaiga Stowers	8 June 2019	Junior World Championships	Suva, Fiji	

=== Women (1998–2018) ===
Event	Record	Athlete	Date	Meet	Place	Ref
48 kg
Snatch						
Clean & Jerk						
Total						
53 kg
Snatch						
Clean & Jerk						
Total						
58 kg
Snatch	60 kg	Sekolasilika Isaia	5 December 2017	Pacific Mini Games	Port Vila, Vanuatu	
Clean & Jerk	83 kg	Sekolasilika Isaia	5 December 2017	Pacific Mini Games	Port Vila, Vanuatu	
Total	143 kg	Sekolasilika Isaia	5 December 2017	Pacific Mini Games	Port Vila, Vanuatu	
63 kg
Snatch						
Clean & Jerk						
Total						
69 kg
Snatch	69 kg					
Clean & Jerk	111 kg	Mary Opeloge	17 October 2008		Pune, India	
Total	159 kg					
75 kg
Snatch	111 kg	Mary Opeloge	7 December 2012	Samoan Championships	Tuanaimato, Samoa	
Clean & Jerk	135 kg	Mary Opeloge	7 December 2012	Samoan Championships	Tuanaimato, Samoa	
Total	246 kg	Mary Opeloge	7 December 2012	Samoan Championships	Tuanaimato, Samoa	
90 kg
Snatch	76 kg	Lesila Fiapule	7 December 2017	Pacific Mini Games	Port Vila, Vanuatu	
Clean & Jerk	97 kg	Lesila Fiapule	7 December 2017	Pacific Mini Games	Port Vila, Vanuatu	
Total	173 kg	Lesila Fiapule	7 December 2017	Pacific Mini Games	Port Vila, Vanuatu	
+90 kg
Snatch	126 kg	Ele Opeloge	6 May 2010		Suva, Fiji	
Clean & Jerk	161 kg	Ele Opeloge	7 September 2011	Pacific Games	Noumea, New Caledonia	
Total	285 kg	Ele Opeloge	10 October 2010	Commonwealth Games	New Delhi, India	
