= 2019 Oceania Weightlifting Championships =

2019 weightlifting competition

- Host city: Apia, Samoa
- Dates: 9–13 July 2019
- Main venue: Faleata Sports Complex

The 2019 Oceania Weightlifting Championships took place at the Faleata Sports Complex in Apia, Samoa from 9 to 13 July 2019.

Together with that year's Pacific Games weightlifting competition and Commonwealth Championships, they were held concurrently as a single event designated the 2019 Pacific Games, Oceania & Commonwealth Championships. Athletes from certain countries were able to contest multiple championships simultaneously (including age-group variants).

Results shown below are for the senior competition only. Junior and youth results are cited here and here respectively.

== Medal tables ==
Ranking by Big (Total result) medals

* Host nation (Samoa)

Rank	Nation	Gold	Silver	Bronze	Total
1	Samoa*	4	5	2	11
2	Australia	4	2	5	11
3	Papua New Guinea	3	4	1	8
4	New Zealand	3	1	1	5
5	Kiribati	2	3	1	6
6	Nauru	2	0	4	6
7	Solomon Islands	1	2	3	6
8	Tonga	1	0	0	1
9	Guam	0	2	0	2
10	American Samoa	0	1	0	1
11	Marshall Islands	0	0	1	1
Totals (11 entries)		20	20	18	58

Ranking by all medals: Big (Total result) and Small (Snatch and Clean & Jerk)

* Host nation (Samoa)

Rank	Nation	Gold	Silver	Bronze	Total
1	Samoa*	16	10	7	33
2	Australia	12	8	15	35
3	Papua New Guinea	9	9	8	26
4	New Zealand	7	7	3	17
5	Kiribati	6	8	1	15
6	Nauru	5	2	11	18
7	Solomon Islands	3	8	5	16
8	Tonga	2	0	2	4
9	Guam	0	5	2	7
10	American Samoa	0	2	0	2
11	Marshall Islands	0	1	2	3
Totals (11 entries)		60	60	56	176

== Medal summary ==
=== Men ===
Event	Gold		Silver		Bronze	
55 kg
Snatch	Elson Brechtefeld; Nauru	93 kg	Walter Shadrack; Solomon Islands	80 kg	Gahuana Nauari; Papua New Guinea	80 kg
Clean & Jerk	Elson Brechtefeld; Nauru	122 kg	Gahuana Nauari; Papua New Guinea	108 kg	Scofield Sinaka; Papua New Guinea	108 kg
Total	Elson Brechtefeld; Nauru	215 kg	Gahuana Nauari; Papua New Guinea	188 kg	Walter Shadrack; Solomon Islands	185 kg
61 kg
Snatch	Morea Baru; Papua New Guinea	124 kg	Cester Ramohaka; Solomon Islands	99 kg	John Tafi; Samoa	95 kg
Clean & Jerk	Morea Baru; Papua New Guinea	160 kg	Cester Ramohaka; Solomon Islands	127 kg	John Tafi; Samoa	115 kg
Total	Morea Baru; Papua New Guinea	284 kg	Cester Ramohaka; Solomon Islands	226 kg	John Tafi; Samoa	210 kg
67 kg
Snatch	Vaipava Ioane; Samoa	125 kg	Ruben Katoatau; Kiribati	122 kg	Ezekiel Moses; Nauru	115 kg
Clean & Jerk	Vaipava Ioane; Samoa	164 kg	Ruben Katoatau; Kiribati	160 kg	Ezekiel Moses; Nauru	145 kg
Total	Vaipava Ioane; Samoa	289 kg	Ruben Katoatau; Kiribati	282 kg	Ezekiel Moses; Nauru	260 kg
73 kg
Snatch	Taretiita Tabaroua; Kiribati	124 kg	Brandon Wakeling; Australia	123 kg	Ika Aliklik; Nauru	121 kg
Clean & Jerk	Brandon Wakeling; Australia	167 kg	Taretiita Tabaroua; Kiribati	158 kg	Larko Doguape; Nauru	150 kg
Total	Brandon Wakeling; Australia	290 kg	Taretiita Tabaroua; Kiribati	282 kg	Larko Doguape; Nauru	270 kg
81 kg
Snatch	Jack Opeloge; Samoa	138 kg	Cameron McTaggart; New Zealand	137 kg	Kabuati Bob; Marshall Islands	128 kg
Clean & Jerk	Cameron McTaggart; New Zealand	168 kg	Kabuati Bob; Marshall Islands	160 kg	Jack Opeloge; Samoa	160 kg
Total	Cameron McTaggart; New Zealand	305 kg	Jack Opeloge; Samoa	298 kg	Kabuati Bob; Marshall Islands	288 kg
89 kg
Snatch	Don Opeloge; Samoa	145 kg	Boris Elesin; Australia	142 kg	Joel Gregson; Australia	126 kg
Clean & Jerk	Don Opeloge; Samoa	193 kg	Boris Elesin; Australia	166 kg	Joel Gregson; Australia	162 kg
Total	Don Opeloge; Samoa	338 kg	Boris Elesin; Australia	308 kg	Joel Gregson; Australia	288 kg
96 kg
Snatch	Steven Kari; Papua New Guinea	156 kg	Maeu Nanai Livi; Samoa	154 kg	Ridge Barredo; Australia	139 kg
Clean & Jerk	Steven Kari; Papua New Guinea	198 kg	Maeu Nanai Livi; Samoa	181 kg	Ridge Barredo; Australia	175 kg
Total	Steven Kari; Papua New Guinea	354 kg	Maeu Nanai Livi; Samoa	335 kg	Ridge Barredo; Australia	314 kg
102 kg
Snatch	Petunu Opeloge; Samoa	150 kg	David Katoatau; Kiribati	142 kg	Petelo Lautusi; Samoa	140 kg
Clean & Jerk	David Katoatau; Kiribati	196 kg	Petelo Lautusi; Samoa	170 kg	Not awarded (no registered mark)	
Total	David Katoatau; Kiribati	338 kg	Petelo Lautusi; Samoa	310 kg	Not awarded (no registered mark)	
109 kg
Snatch	Sanele Mao; Samoa	160 kg	Matthew Lydement; Australia	156 kg	Sio Pomelile; Tonga	143 kg
Clean & Jerk	Sanele Mao; Samoa	206 kg	Tanumafili Jungblut; American Samoa	194 kg	Jackson Roberts-Young; Australia	192 kg
Total	Sanele Mao; Samoa	366 kg	Tanumafili Jungblut; American Samoa	336 kg	Jackson Roberts-Young; Australia	333 kg
+109 kg
Snatch	Lauititi Lui; Samoa	178 kg	David Liti; New Zealand	177 kg	Aisake Tuitupou; Tonga	140 kg
Clean & Jerk	Aisake Tuitupou; Tonga	190 kg	Malachi Faamausilifala; Samoa	150 kg	Not awarded (no registered mark)	
Total	Aisake Tuitupou; Tonga	330 kg	Malachi Faamausilifala; Samoa	281 kg	Not awarded (no registered mark)	

=== Women ===
Event	Gold		Silver		Bronze	
45 kg
Snatch	Tebora Willy; Kiribati	52 kg	Konio Toua; Papua New Guinea	50 kg	Daniella Ika; Nauru	35 kg
Clean & Jerk	Tebora Willy; Kiribati	67 kg	Konio Toua; Papua New Guinea	65 kg	Dayalani Calma; Guam	63 kg
Total	Tebora Willy; Kiribati	119 kg	Konio Toua; Papua New Guinea	115 kg	Daniella Ika; Nauru	82 kg
49 kg
Snatch	Dika Toua; Papua New Guinea	75 kg	Dalamaya Calma; Guam	53 kg	Korema Gavera; Papua New Guinea	52 kg
Clean & Jerk	Dika Toua; Papua New Guinea	100 kg	Jaylyn Mala; Solomon Islands	65 kg	Dalamaya Calma; Guam	64 kg
Total	Dika Toua; Papua New Guinea	175 kg	Dalamaya Calma; Guam	117 kg	Jaylyn Mala; Solomon Islands	115 kg
55 kg
Snatch	Mary Kini Lifu; Solomon Islands	73 kg	Jacinta Sumagaysay; Guam	71 kg	Elizabeth Bisafo; Solomon Islands	69 kg
Clean & Jerk	Mary Kini Lifu; Solomon Islands	89 kg	Jacinta Sumagaysay; Guam	88 kg	Elizabeth Bisafo; Solomon Islands	83 kg
Total	Mary Kini Lifu; Solomon Islands	162 kg	Jacinta Sumagaysay; Guam	159 kg	Elizabeth Bisafo; Solomon Islands	152 kg
59 kg
Snatch	Erika Yamasaki; Australia	80 kg	Jenly Tegu Wini; Solomon Islands	79 kg	Seen Lee; Australia	78 kg
Clean & Jerk	Erika Yamasaki; Australia	103 kg	Jenly Tegu Wini; Solomon Islands	102 kg	Seen Lee; Australia	101 kg
Total	Erika Yamasaki; Australia	183 kg	Jenly Tegu Wini; Solomon Islands	181 kg	Seen Lee; Australia	179 kg
64 kg
Snatch	Kiana Elliott; Australia	99 kg	Sarah Cochrane; Australia	92 kg	Megan Signal; New Zealand	89 kg
Clean & Jerk	Kiana Elliott; Australia	114 kg	Megan Signal; New Zealand	114 kg	Sarah Cochrane; Australia	112 kg
Total	Kiana Elliott; Australia	213 kg	Sarah Cochrane; Australia	204 kg	Megan Signal; New Zealand	203 kg
71 kg
Snatch	Ebony Gorincu; Australia	91 kg	Maximina Uepa; Nauru	86 kg	Sandra Ako; Papua New Guinea	80 kg
Clean & Jerk	Maximina Uepa; Nauru	105 kg	Tiiau Bakaekiri; Kiribati	101 kg	Sandra Ako; Papua New Guinea	98 kg
Total	Maximina Uepa; Nauru	191 kg	Tiiau Bakaekiri; Kiribati	179 kg	Sandra Ako; Papua New Guinea	178 kg
76 kg
Snatch	Kanah Andrews-Nahu; New Zealand	94 kg	Bailey Rogers; New Zealand	92 kg	Stephanie Davies; Australia	85 kg
Clean & Jerk	Kanah Andrews-Nahu; New Zealand	112 kg	Stephanie Davies; Australia	111 kg	Bailey Rogers; New Zealand	110 kg
Total	Kanah Andrews-Nahu; New Zealand	206 kg	Bailey Rogers; New Zealand	202 kg	Stephanie Davies; Australia	196 kg
81 kg
Snatch	Leotina Petelo; Samoa	89 kg	Ariana Uepa; Nauru	71 kg	Noi Igo; Papua New Guinea	70 kg
Clean & Jerk	Leotina Petelo; Samoa	110 kg	Noi Igo; Papua New Guinea	94 kg	Ariana Uepa; Nauru	91 kg
Total	Leotina Petelo; Samoa	199 kg	Noi Igo; Papua New Guinea	164 kg	Ariana Uepa; Nauru	162 kg
87 kg
Snatch	Kaity Fassina; Australia	101 kg	Hayley Whiting; New Zealand	94 kg	Lorraine Harry; Papua New Guinea	85 kg
Clean & Jerk	Kaity Fassina; Australia	119 kg	Lorraine Harry; Papua New Guinea	107 kg	Roviel Detenamo; Nauru	93 kg
Total	Kaity Fassina; Australia	220 kg	Lorraine Harry; Papua New Guinea	192 kg	Tiaterenga Kaua; Kiribati	165 kg
+87 kg
Snatch	Laurel Hubbard; New Zealand	125 kg	Feagaiga Stowers; Samoa	119 kg	Charisma Amoe-Tarrant; Australia	109 kg
Clean & Jerk	Iuniarra Sipaia; Samoa	147 kg	Laurel Hubbard; New Zealand	143 kg	Feagaiga Stowers; Samoa	142 kg
Total	Laurel Hubbard; New Zealand	268 kg	Feagaiga Stowers; Samoa	261 kg	Iuniarra Sipaia; Samoa	255 kg
