= 2019 Commonwealth Weightlifting Championships =

- Host city: Apia, Samoa
- Dates: 9–13 July 2019
- Main venue: Faleata Sports Complex

The 2019 Commonwealth Weightlifting Championships took place at the Faleata Sports Complex in Apia, Samoa from 9 to 13 July 2019.

Together with that year's Pacific Games weightlifting competition and Oceania Championships, they were held concurrently as a single event designated the 2019 Pacific Games, Oceania & Commonwealth Championships. Athletes from certain countries were able to contest multiple championships simultaneously (including age-group variants).

Results shown below are for the senior competition only. Junior and youth results are cited here and here respectively.

== Medal tables ==
Ranking by Big (Total result) medals

* Host nation (Samoa)

Rank	Nation	Gold	Silver	Bronze	Total
1	India	10	5	0	15
2	Samoa*	4	2	4	10
3	Papua New Guinea	2	2	2	6
4	Canada	1	0	2	3
4	New Zealand	1	0	2	3
6	England	1	0	0	1
6	Tonga	1	0	0	1
8	Australia	0	4	4	8
9	Nauru	0	2	1	3
9	Wales	0	2	1	3
11	Kiribati	0	1	2	3
12	Solomon Islands	0	1	0	1
12	South Africa	0	1	0	1
14	Malaysia	0	0	1	1
Totals (14 entries)		20	20	19	59

Ranking by all medals: Big (Total result) and Small (Snatch and Clean & Jerk)

* Host nation (Samoa)

Rank	Nation	Gold	Silver	Bronze	Total
1	India	27	16	2	45
2	Samoa*	14	7	8	29
3	Papua New Guinea	6	4	6	16
4	New Zealand	3	2	8	13
5	Canada	3	1	4	8
6	Australia	2	12	8	22
7	England	2	1	0	3
8	Tonga	2	0	3	5
9	South Africa	1	1	0	2
10	Nauru	0	6	3	9
11	Wales	0	5	4	9
12	Kiribati	0	2	8	10
13	Solomon Islands	0	2	2	4
14	Malaysia	0	1	2	3
Totals (14 entries)		60	60	58	178

== Medal summary ==
=== Men ===
Event	Gold		Silver		Bronze	
55 kg
Snatch	Rishikanta Singh; India	105 kg	Elson Brechtefeld; Nauru	93 kg	Walter Shadrack; Solomon Islands	80 kg
Clean & Jerk	Rishikanta Singh; India	130 kg	Elson Brechtefeld; Nauru	122 kg	Gahuana Nauari; Papua New Guinea	108 kg
Total	Rishikanta Singh; India	235 kg	Elson Brechtefeld; Nauru	215 kg	Gahuana Nauari; Papua New Guinea	188 kg
61 kg
Snatch	Morea Baru; Papua New Guinea	124 kg	Raja Muthupandi; India	120 kg	Aznil Bidin; Malaysia	120 kg
Clean & Jerk	Morea Baru; Papua New Guinea	160 kg	Cester Ramohaka; Solomon Islands	127 kg	John Tafi; Samoa	115 kg
Total	Morea Baru; Papua New Guinea	284 kg	Cester Ramohaka; Solomon Islands	226 kg	John Tafi; Samoa	210 kg
67 kg
Snatch	Jeremy Lalrinnunga; India	136 kg WYR	Vaipava Ioane; Samoa	125 kg	Gareth Evans; Wales	125 kg
Clean & Jerk	Vaipava Ioane; Samoa	164 kg	Gareth Evans; Wales	161 kg	Ruben Katoatau; Kiribati	160 kg
Total	Vaipava Ioane; Samoa	289 kg	Gareth Evans; Wales	286 kg	Ruben Katoatau; Kiribati	282 kg
73 kg
Snatch	Achinta Sheuli; India	136 kg	Muhammad Erry Hidayat; Malaysia	127 kg	Taretiita Tabaroua; Kiribati	124 kg
Clean & Jerk	Achinta Sheuli; India	169 kg	Brandon Wakeling; Australia	167 kg	Taretiita Tabaroua; Kiribati	158 kg
Total	Achinta Sheuli; India	305 kg	Brandon Wakeling; Australia	290 kg	Muhammad Erry Hidayat; Malaysia	282 kg
81 kg
Snatch	Ajay Singh; India	148 kg	Jack Opeloge; Samoa	138 kg	Cameron McTaggart; New Zealand	137 kg
Clean & Jerk	Ajay Singh; India	190 kg	Papul Changmai; India	178 kg	Cameron McTaggart; New Zealand	168 kg
Total	Ajay Singh; India	338 kg	Papul Changmai; India	313 kg	Cameron McTaggart; New Zealand	305 kg
89 kg
Snatch	Don Opeloge; Samoa	145 kg	Ragala Venkat Rahul; India	145 kg	Boris Elesin; Australia	142 kg
Clean & Jerk	Don Opeloge; Samoa	193 kg	Ragala Venkat Rahul; India	180 kg	Boris Elesin; Australia	166 kg
Total	Don Opeloge; Samoa	338 kg	Ragala Venkat Rahul; India	325 kg	Boris Elesin; Australia	308 kg
96 kg
Snatch	Steven Kari; Papua New Guinea	156 kg	Maeu Nanai Livi; Samoa	154 kg	Vikas Thakur; India	153 kg
Clean & Jerk	Steven Kari; Papua New Guinea	198 kg	Vikas Thakur; India	185 kg	Maeu Nanai Livi; Samoa	181 kg
Total	Steven Kari; Papua New Guinea	354 kg	Vikas Thakur; India	338 kg	Maeu Nanai Livi; Samoa	335 kg
102 kg
Snatch	Petunu Opeloge; Samoa	150 kg	Pardeep Singh; India	148 kg	David Katoatau; Kiribati	142 kg
Clean & Jerk	Pardeep Singh; India	202 kg	David Katoatau; Kiribati	196 kg	Petelo Lautusi; Samoa	170 kg
Total	Pardeep Singh; India	350 kg	David Katoatau; Kiribati	338 kg	Petelo Lautusi; Samoa	310 kg
109 kg
Snatch	Sanele Mao; Samoa	160 kg	Matthew Lydement; Australia	156 kg	Sio Pomelile; Tonga	143 kg
Clean & Jerk	Sanele Mao; Samoa	206 kg	Jackson Roberts-Young; Australia	192 kg	Sio Pomelile; Tonga	185 kg
Total	Sanele Mao; Samoa	366 kg	Jackson Roberts-Young; Australia	333 kg	Matthew Lydement; Australia	331 kg
+109 kg
Snatch	Lauititi Lui; Samoa	178 kg	David Liti; New Zealand	177 kg	Aisake Tuitupou; Tonga	140 kg
Clean & Jerk	Aisake Tuitupou; Tonga	190 kg	Malachi Faamausilifala; Samoa	150 kg	Not awarded (no registered mark)	
Total	Aisake Tuitupou; Tonga	330 kg	Malachi Faamausilifala; Samoa	281 kg	Not awarded (no registered mark)	

=== Women ===
Event	Gold		Silver		Bronze	
45 kg
Snatch	Jhilli Dalabehera; India	70 kg	Hannah Powell; Wales	64 kg	Tebora Willy; Kiribati	52 kg
Clean & Jerk	Jhilli Dalabehera; India	94 kg	Hannah Powell; Wales	84 kg	Tebora Willy; Kiribati	67 kg
Total	Jhilli Dalabehera; India	164 kg	Hannah Powell; Wales	148 kg	Tebora Willy; Kiribati	119 kg
49 kg
Snatch	Saikhom Mirabai Chanu; India	84 kg	Amanda Braddock; Canada	77 kg	Dika Toua; Papua New Guinea	75 kg
Clean & Jerk	Saikhom Mirabai Chanu; India	107 kg	Dika Toua; Papua New Guinea	100 kg	Amanda Braddock; Canada	90 kg
Total	Saikhom Mirabai Chanu; India	191 kg	Dika Toua; Papua New Guinea	175 kg	Amanda Braddock; Canada	167 kg
55 kg
Snatch	Santoshi Matsa; India	80 kg	Bindyarani Devi Sorokhaibam; India	78 kg	Catrin Jones; Wales	77 kg
Clean & Jerk	Bindyarani Devi Sorokhaibam; India	105 kg	Santoshi Matsa; India	102 kg	Catrin Jones; Wales	96 kg
Total	Bindyarani Devi Sorokhaibam; India	183 kg	Santoshi Matsa; India	182 kg	Catrin Jones; Wales	173 kg
59 kg
Snatch	Johanni Taljaard; South Africa	83 kg	Erika Yamasaki; Australia	80 kg	Davinder Kaur; India	80 kg
Clean & Jerk	Davinder Kaur; India	104 kg	Erika Yamasaki; Australia	103 kg	Jenly Tegu Wini; Solomon Islands	102 kg
Total	Davinder Kaur; India	184 kg	Johanni Taljaard; South Africa	183 kg	Erika Yamasaki; Australia	183 kg
64 kg
Snatch	Kiana Elliott; Australia	99 kg	Rakhi Halder; India	94 kg	Sarah Cochrane; Australia	92 kg
Clean & Jerk	Rakhi Halder; India	120 kg	Kiana Elliott; Australia	114 kg	Megan Signal; New Zealand	114 kg
Total	Rakhi Halder; India	214 kg	Kiana Elliott; Australia	213 kg	Sarah Cochrane; Australia	204 kg
71 kg
Snatch	Maya Laylor; Canada	97 kg	Ebony Gorincu; Australia	91 kg	Maximina Uepa; Nauru	86 kg
Clean & Jerk	Maya Laylor; Canada	118 kg	Maximina Uepa; Nauru	105 kg	Jeenat Billen; Canada	102 kg
Total	Maya Laylor; Canada	215 kg	Maximina Uepa; Nauru	191 kg	Jeenat Billen; Canada	182 kg
76 kg
Snatch	Kanah Andrews-Nahu; New Zealand	94 kg	Emily Godley; England	93 kg	Bailey Rogers; New Zealand	92 kg
Clean & Jerk	Emily Godley; England	127 kg	Manpreet Kaur; India	116 kg	Kanah Andrews-Nahu; New Zealand	112 kg
Total	Emily Godley; England	220 kg	Manpreet Kaur; India	207 kg	Kanah Andrews-Nahu; New Zealand	206 kg
81 kg
Snatch	Leotina Petelo; Samoa	89 kg	Ariana Uepa; Nauru	71 kg	Noi Igo; Papua New Guinea	70 kg
Clean & Jerk	Leotina Petelo; Samoa	110 kg	Noi Igo; Papua New Guinea	94 kg	Ariana Uepa; Nauru	91 kg
Total	Leotina Petelo; Samoa	199 kg	Noi Igo; Papua New Guinea	164 kg	Ariana Uepa; Nauru	162 kg
87 kg
Snatch	Kaity Fassina; Australia	101 kg	Anuradha Pavunraj; India	100 kg	Hayley Whiting; New Zealand	94 kg
Clean & Jerk	Anuradha Pavunraj; India	121 kg	Kaity Fassina; Australia	119 kg	Lorraine Harry; Papua New Guinea	107 kg
Total	Anuradha Pavunraj; India	221 kg	Kaity Fassina; Australia	220 kg	Lorraine Harry; Papua New Guinea	192 kg
+87 kg
Snatch	Laurel Hubbard; New Zealand	125 kg	Feagaiga Stowers; Samoa	119 kg	Charisma Amoe-Tarrant; Australia	109 kg
Clean & Jerk	Iuniarra Sipaia; Samoa	147 kg	Laurel Hubbard; New Zealand	143 kg	Feagaiga Stowers; Samoa	142 kg
Total	Laurel Hubbard; New Zealand	268 kg	Feagaiga Stowers; Samoa	261 kg	Iuniarra Sipaia; Samoa	255 kg
