= Weightlifting at the 2022 Commonwealth Games – Men's 109 kg =

Weightlifting – Men's 109 kg at the 2022 Commonwealth Games
- Venue: National Exhibition Centre
- Dates: 3 August 2022
- Competitors: 11 from 11 nations
- Winning total weight: 361

Medalists
gold medal	Junior Ngadja Nyabeyeu	Cameroon
silver medal	Jack Opeloge	Samoa
bronze medal	Lovepreet Singh	India

The Men's 109 kg weightlifting event at the 2022 Commonwealth Games took place at the National Exhibition Centre on 3 August 2022. The weightlifter from Cameroon won the gold, with a combined lift of 361 kg.

== Records ==
Prior to this competition, the existing world, Commonwealth and Games records were as follows:

World record	Snatch	Yang Zhe (CHN)	200 kg	Tashkent, Uzbekistan	24 April 2021
World record	Clean & Jerk	Ruslan Nurudinov (UZB)	241 kg	Tashkent, Uzbekistan	24 April 2021
World record	Total	Simon Martirosyan (ARM)	435 kg	Ashgabat, Turkmenistan	9 November 2018
Commonwealth record	Snatch	Matthew Lydement (AUS)	166 kg	Brisbane, Australia	11 October 2020
Commonwealth record	Clean & Jerk	Sanele Mao (SAM)	206 kg	Apia, Samoa	13 July 2019
Commonwealth record	Total	Sanele Mao (SAM)	366 kg	Apia, Samoa	13 July 2019
Games record	Snatch	Commonwealth Games Standard	166 kg		
Games record	Clean & Jerk	Commonwealth Games Standard	209 kg		
Games record	Total	Commonwealth Games Standard	369 kg		

When the previous records and weight classes were discarded following readjustment, the IWF defined "world standards" as the minimum lifts needed to qualify as world records (WR), CommonWealth Authority defined "Commonwealth standards" and "Commonwealth games standards" as the minimum lifts needed to qualify as Commonwealth record (CR) and Commonwealth games record (GR) in the new weight classes. Wherever World Standard/Commonwealth Standard/Commonwealth Games Standard appear in the list above, no qualified weightlifter has yet lifted the benchmark weights in a sanctioned competition.

== Schedule ==
All times are British Summer Time (UTC+1)

Date	Time	Round
Wednesday 3 August 2022	09:30	Final

== Results ==
Rank	Athlete	Body weight (kg)	Snatch (kg)				Clean & Jerk (kg)				Total
Rank	Athlete	Body weight (kg)	1	2	3	Result	1	2	3	Result	Total
1st place, gold medalist(s)	Junior Ngadja Nyabeyeu (CMR)	104.11	156	~~160~~	160	160	196	201	~~205~~	201	361
2nd place, silver medalist(s)	Jack Opeloge (SAM)	102.98	155	160	164	164	194	~~200~~	~~201~~	194	358
3rd place, bronze medalist(s)	Lovepreet Singh (IND)	108.60	157	161	163	163	185	189	192	192	355
4	Pierre-Alexandre Bessette (CAN)	100.81	150	157	163	163	172	~~182~~	186	186	349
5	Jackson Roberts-Young (AUS)	108.77	145	~~150~~	~~150~~	145	190	202	~~211~~	202	347
6	Andy Griffiths (ENG)	108.86	151	155	159	159	180	187	~~193~~	187	346
7	Jordan Sakkas (WAL)	108.20	~~146~~	~~146~~	146	146	~~182~~	182	~~190~~	182	328
8	Sio Talakai Pomelile (TGA)	108.98	140	~~145~~	~~146~~	140	170	180	~~189~~	180	320
9	Hanzala Dastgir Butt (PAK)	108.70	135	~~142~~	142	142	173	~~180~~	~~180~~	173	315
―	Muhammad Hafiz Shamsuddin (MAS)	108.04	~~148~~	148	~~155~~	148	~~178~~	~~178~~	~~178~~	NM	DNF
―	Koale Junior Tasi Taala (NZL)	108.98	~~145~~	~~146~~	~~146~~	NM	-	-	-	―	DNF
