= Weightlifting at the 2022 Commonwealth Games – Women's 64 kg =

Weightlifting – Women's 64 kg at the 2022 Commonwealth Games
- Venue: National Exhibition Centre
- Dates: 1 August
- Competitors: 12 from 12 nations
- Winning total: 231 kg

Medalists
| gold medal | Maude Charron | Canada |
| silver medal | Sarah Maureen Cochrane | Australia |
| bronze medal | Islamiyat Adebukola Yusuf | Nigeria |

The Women's 64 kg weightlifting event at the 2022 Commonwealth Games took place at the National Exhibition Centre on 1 August 2022. The weightlifter from Canada won the gold, with a combined lift of 231 kg.

== Records ==
Prior to this competition, the existing World, Commonwealth and Games records were as follows:
When the previous records and weight classes were discarded following readjustment, the IWF defined "world standards" as the minimum lifts needed to qualify as world records (WR), CommonWealth Authority defined "Commonwealth standards" and "Commonwealth games standards" as the minimum lifts needed to qualify as Commonwealth record (CR) and Commonwealth games record (GR) in the new weight classes. Wherever World Standard/Commonwealth Standard/Commonwealth Games Standard appear in the list below, no qualified weightlifter has yet lifted the benchmark weights in a sanctioned competition.

| World record | Snatch | Deng Wei (CHN) | 117 kg | Tianjin, China | 11 December 2019 |
| World record | Clean & Jerk | Deng Wei (CHN) | 145 kg | Pattaya, Thailand | 22 September 2019 |
| World record | Total | Deng Wei (CHN) | 261 kg | Pattaya, Thailand | 22 September 2019 |
| Commonwealth record | Snatch | Maude Charron (CAN) | 107 kg | Santo Domingo, Dominican Republic | 21 April 2021 |
| Commonwealth record | Clean & Jerk | Maude Charron (CAN) | 133 kg | Santo Domingo, Dominican Republic | 21 April 2021 |
| Commonwealth record | Total | Maude Charron (CAN) | 240 kg | Santo Domingo, Dominican Republic | 21 April 2021 |
| Games record | Snatch | Commonwealth Games Standard | 92 kg | | |
| Games record | Clean & Jerk | Commonwealth Games Standard | 116 kg | | |
| Games record | Total | Commonwealth Games Standard | 207 kg | | |

The following records were established during the competition:

| Snatch | 101 kg | Maude Charron (CAN) | GR |
| Clean & Jerk | 130 kg | Maude Charron (CAN) | GR |
| Total | 231 kg | Maude Charron (CAN) | GR |

== Schedule ==
All times are British Summer Time (UTC+1)

| Date | Time | Round |
|---|---|---|
| Monday 1 August 2022 | 14:00 | Final |

== Results ==
| Rank | Athlete | Body weight (kg) | Snatch (kg) | | | | Clean & Jerk (kg) | | | | Total |
| Rank | Athlete | Body weight (kg) | 1 | 2 | 3 | Result | 1 | 2 | 3 | Result | Total |
|---|---|---|---|---|---|---|---|---|---|---|---|
| 1st place, gold medalist(s) | Maude Charron (CAN) | 61.23 | 98 | ~~101~~ | 101 | 101 GR | 123 | 127 | 130 | 130 GR | 231 GR |
| 2nd place, silver medalist(s) | Sarah Maureen Cochrane (AUS) | 63.63 | 93 | 97 | 100 | 100 | 112 | 116 | ~~118~~ | 116 | 216 |
| 3rd place, bronze medalist(s) | Islamiyat Adebukola Yusuf (NGR) | 63.45 | 93 | ~~97~~ | ~~97~~ | 93 | 113 | 116 | 119 | 119 | 212 |
| 4 | Zoe Smith (ENG) | 63.86 | 88 | ~~91~~ | ~~91~~ | 88 | 114 | 122 | ~~125~~ | 122 | 210 |
| 5 | Emma McIntyre (NZL) | 63.51 | 81 | 84 | ~~88~~ | 84 | 100 | 103 | ~~106~~ | 103 | 187 |
| 6 | Yasmin Zammit Stevens (MLT) | 63.51 | ~~81~~ | 81 | 83 | 83 | 100 | ~~103~~ | 103 | 103 | 186 |
| 7 | Christie Marie Williams (WAL) | 63.74 | 80 | 83 | ~~85~~ | 83 | ~~100~~ | ~~100~~ | 100 | 100 | 183 |
| 8 | Mabia Aktar (BAN) | 63.86 | 74 | 78 | ~~80~~ | 78 | 100 | 103 | ~~105~~ | 103 | 181 |
| 9 | Caroline Doyle (NIR) | 63.15 | 78 | ~~81~~ | ~~81~~ | 78 | 98 | 101 | ~~105~~ | 101 | 179 |
| 10 | Nicole Lin Li Heng (SGP) | 63.19 | 73 | 76 | ~~79~~ | 76 | 93 | ~~96~~ | ~~96~~ | 93 | 169 |
| 11 | Rachel Achieng Enock (KEN) | 63.39 | 65 | 70 | ~~75~~ | 70 | 78 | 82 | 85 | 85 | 155 |
| 12 | Bernice Detudamo (NRU) | 60.94 | 60 | ~~65~~ | ~~65~~ | 60 | 75 | 78 | 81 | 81 | 141 |
