= Anuradha Pavunraj =

Indian weightlifter (born 1992)

Anuradha Pavunraj or P. Anuradha (born 25 May 1992) is an Indian weightlifter from Pudhukkottai, Tamil Nadu. She represented India in the 2019 Commonwealth Weightlifting Championships in Apia, Samoa. She won the gold medal in the Women's 87 kg category weightlifting with a lift of 221 kg (100 kg in snatch and 121 kg in clean and jerk).

== Early life ==
Anuradha was born on 25 May 1992 in Nemmelipatti in Pudhukkottai, Tamil Nadu. She has an elder brother, Marimuthu. Having lost their father when they were young, her elder brother gave up his studies to help her. He guided her to pursue in Sports instead of becoming an engineering graduate.

She completed her Computer Science graduation from Rajah's College and Post graduation from JJ College. She joined as a sub-inspector of Tamil Nadu Police in 2016 in Thanjavur District.

In March 2019, under Government of India's Sai sponsorship she trained at the Indian Camp in Patiala and got selected for Commonwealth Championships, where she won gold.

== Major results ==
Year	Venue	Weight	Snatch (kg)				Clean & Jerk (kg)				Total	Rank
Year	Venue	Weight	1	2	3	Rank	1	2	3	Rank	Total	Rank
Commonwealth Weightlifting Championships
2019	Apia, Samoa	87 kg	92	96	100	2	113	119	121	1	221	1st place, gold medalist(s)
