= Pardeep Singh =

Indian weightlifter

Personal information
- Born: 4 January 1995 (age 31) Jalandhar, Punjab, India

Sport
- Country: India
- Sport: Weightlifting
- Event: 105 kg
Medal record
Men's weightlifting
Representing India
Commonwealth Games
Silver medal – second place	2018 Gold Coast	105 kg
Commonwealth Championships
Gold medal – first place	2017 Gold Coast	105 kg
Gold medal – first place	2019 Apia	102 kg

Pardeep Singh is an Indian weightlifter from Jalandhar, Punjab who won silver medal in the men's 105 kg weight class at the 2018 Commonwealth Games.
