= Brandon Wakeling =

Australian weightlifter (born 1994)

Personal information
- Full name: Brandon Dean Wakeling
- Nicknames: Brando; Brandy
- Born: 2 February 1994 (age 32) Campbelltown, New South Wales, Australia
- Height: 167 cm (5 ft 6 in)

Sport
- Country: Australia
- Sport: Weightlifting
- Coached by: Miles Wydall
Medal record
Men's weightlifting
Representing Australia
Commonwealth Championships
Silver medal – second place	2019 Apia	73 kg
Oceania Championships
Gold medal – first place	2019 Apia	73 kg
Silver medal – second place	2017 Gold Coast	69 kg
Pacific Games
Gold medal – first place	2019 Apia	73 kg
Arafura Games
Bronze medal – third place	2019 Darwin	73 kg

Brandon Dean Wakeling (born 2 February 1994) is an Australian weightlifter. He won the gold medal in the men's 73 kg event at the 2019 Pacific Games held in Apia, Samoa. He represented Australia at the 2020 Summer Olympics in Tokyo, Japan. He also represented Australia at the Commonwealth Games in 2018 and 2022.

== Career ==
In 2017, Wakeling won the silver medal in the men's 69 kg event at the Oceania Weightlifting Championships held in Gold Coast, Australia. In the same month, he also competed in the men's 69 kg event at the 2017 Asian Indoor and Martial Arts Games held in Ashgabat, Turkmenistan. He finished in 8th place.

Wakeling represented Australia at the 2018 Commonwealth Games held in Gold Coast, Queensland, Australia and he competed in the men's 69 kg event. He finished in 7th place. At the 2018 World Weightlifting Championships held in Ashgabat, Turkmenistan, he competed in the men's 73 kg event without winning a medal. He finished in 36th place.

In 2019, Wakeling won the bronze medal in the men's 73 kg event at the Arafura Games. In the same year, he also represented Australia at the 2019 Pacific Games and he won the gold medal in the men's 73 kg event. At this event, he set a new Oceania Clean & Jerk record with a lift of 167 kg. In the men's 73 kg event at the 2019 World Weightlifting Championships he finished in 31st place. In 2019, he also competed in the men's 73 kg event at the 6th International Qatar Cup held in Doha, Qatar where he finished in 9th place.

Wakeling represented Australia at the 2020 Summer Olympics in Tokyo, Japan. He competed in the men's 73 kg event. He finished outside the top ten. He competed in the men's 73 kg event at the 2022 Commonwealth Games held in Birmingham, England.

== Personal life ==
He studied marketing at Griffith University.
