= Kabuati Bob =

Marshallese weightlifter

Personal information
- Citizenship: Marshallese
- Born: 19 October 1994 (age 31)

Sport
- Country: Marshall Islands
- Sport: Weightlifting
- Weight class: 81 kg
Medal record
Men's weightlifting
Representing Marshall Islands
Pacific Games
Bronze medal – third place	2019 Apia	81 kg
Oceania Championships
Silver medal – second place	2018 Le Mont-Dore	85 kg
Bronze medal – third place	2019 Apia	81 kg

Kabuati Bob is a Marshallese weightlifter. He represented Marshall Islands at the 2019 World Weightlifting Championships, as well as the 2015 World Championships.
