= Larko Doguape =

Nauruan weightlifter

Personal information
- Citizenship: Nauruan
- Born: 5 July 2000 (age 25)

Sport
- Country: Nauru
- Sport: Weightlifting
- Weight class: 73 kg
Medal record
Men's weightlifting
Representing Nauru
Pacific Games
Bronze medal – third place	2019 Apia	73 kg
Oceania Championships
Silver medal – second place	2018 Le Mont-Dore	69 kg
Silver medal – second place	2021	81 kg
Bronze medal – third place	2019 Apia	73 kg

Larko Doguape is a Nauruan weightlifter. He represented Nauru at the 2019 World Weightlifting Championships, as well as the 2018 Commonwealth Games.
