= Petelo Lautusi =

Samoan weightlifter

Sport
- Country: Samoa
- Sport: Olympic weightlifting
Medal record
Men's weightlifting
Representing Samoa
Oceania Weightlifting Championships
Gold medal – first place	2021	109kg
Silver medal – second place	2019 Apia	102kg
Commonwealth Weightlifting Championships
Bronze medal – third place	2019 Apia	102kg

Petelo Lautusi is a Samoan weightlifter who has represented Samoa at the Commonwealth Games.

He contested the 2019 Oceania Weightlifting Championships and 2019 Commonwealth Weightlifting Championships, winning silver and bronze in the 102 kg division. At the online 2021 Oceania Weightlifting Championships he won gold in the 109 kg division.

In 2022 he was one of six Samoan weightlifters to qualify for the 2022 Commonwealth Games. On 14 July 2022 he was selected as part of Samoa's team for the 2022 Commonwealth Games in Birmingham.
