= 2021 Oceania Weightlifting Championships =

International weightlifting competition

- Host city: Various
- Dates: 24–26 September 2021
- Main venue: Linked by video

The 2021 Oceania Weightlifting Championships were contested from 24 to 26 September 2021.

The enduring impact of COVID-19 (which required cancellation of the 2020 championships, otherwise set to be held in Nauru) led to the competition being held in various venues across Oceania with competitors and officials linked by video, as opposed to a single competition venue. It was the first time results in a virtual competition were officially endorsed by the International Weightlifting Federation.

== Medal table ==
In contrast to previous championships, no junior or youth rank medals were awarded.

* Host nation (Australia)

Rank	Nation	Gold	Silver	Bronze	Total
1	Australia*	7	3	0	10
2	Samoa	6	2	3	11
3	Papua New Guinea	2	0	3	5
4	Solomon Islands	1	1	2	4
5	Northern Mariana Islands	1	1	0	2
6	Guam	1	0	0	1
7	Nauru	0	8	0	8
8	Kiribati	0	1	1	2
8	Tonga	0	1	1	2
10	Fiji	0	0	2	2
Totals (10 entries)		18	17	12	47

== Medal summary ==
=== Men ===
Event	Gold		Silver		Bronze	
61 kg	Morea Baru; Papua New Guinea	265 kg	Shadrack Cain; Nauru	195 kg	Heni Udu; Papua New Guinea	185 kg
67 kg	Vaipava Ioane; Samoa	289 kg	Ditto Ika; Nauru	231 kg	Duncan Laulua; Samoa	205 kg
73 kg	John Tafi; Samoa	284 kg	Ezekiel Moses; Nauru	277 kg	Ruben Katoatau; Kiribati	250 kg
81 kg	Leo Lark; Australia	295 kg	Larko Doguape; Nauru	275 kg	Igo Lohia; Papua New Guinea	260 kg
89 kg	Beau Garrett; Australia	297 kg	Uea Detudamo; Nauru	272 kg	Toua Udia; Papua New Guinea	266 kg
96 kg	Don Opeloge; Samoa	359 kg	David James; Australia	335 kg	Taniela Rainibogi; Fiji	312 kg
102 kg	Jack Opeloge; Samoa	337 kg	David Katoatau; Kiribati	260 kg	Not awarded (lack of entries)	
109 kg	Petelo Lautusi; Samoa	343 kg	Matthew Lydement; Australia	330 kg	Tavita Leilua; Samoa	248 kg
+109 kg	Suamili Nanai; Australia	353 kg	David Barnhouse; Northern Mariana Islands	255 kg	Not awarded (lack of entries)	

=== Women ===
Event	Gold		Silver		Bronze	
45 kg	Not awarded (lack of entries, no registered total)					
49 kg	Thelma Toua; Papua New Guinea	130 kg	Not awarded (lack of entries, no registered total)			
55 kg	Jenly Tegu Wini; Solomon Islands	176 kg	My-Only Stephen; Nauru	143 kg	Jaylyn Mala; Solomon Islands	110 kg
59 kg	Jacinta Sumagaysay; Guam	165 kg	Mary Kini Lifu; Solomon Islands	145 kg	Betty Waneasi; Solomon Islands	135 kg
64 kg	Sarah Cochrane; Australia	220 kg	Bernice Detudamo; Nauru	138 kg	Not awarded (lack of entries)	
71 kg	Olivia Shelton; Australia	207 kg	Darcy Kay; Australia	204 kg	Talemaiwasa Sebuita; Fiji	138 kg
76 kg	Ebony Gorincu; Australia	208 kg	Maximina Uepa; Nauru	180 kg	Avatu Opeloge; Samoa	147 kg
81 kg	Antonette Labausa; Northern Mariana Islands	157 kg	Salome Manumua; Tonga	147 kg	Not awarded (no registered total)	
87 kg	Eileen Cikamatana; Australia	250 kg	Imoasina Pelenato; Samoa	159 kg	Not awarded (lack of entries)	
+87 kg	Feagaiga Stowers; Samoa	258 kg	Iuniarra Sipaia; Samoa	248 kg	Kuinini Manumua; Tonga	220 kg
