= Leotina Petelo =

Samoan weightlifter

Sport
- Country: Samoa
- Sport: Weightlifter
Medal record
Women's Weightlifter
Representing Samoa
Pacific Games
Gold medal – first place	2019 Apia	+81kg snatch
Gold medal – first place	2019 Apia	+81kg clean & jerk
Gold medal – first place	2019 Apia	+81kg total
Oceania Weightlifting Championships
Gold medal – first place	2019 Apia	+81kg junior
Gold medal – first place	2019 Apia	+81kg senior
Commonwealth Weightlifting Championships
Gold medal – first place	2019 Apia	+81kg junior
Gold medal – first place	2019 Apia	+81kg senior

Leotina Sivelio Petelo is a Samoan weightlifter who has represented Samoa at the Pacific Games.

Petelo is from Ululoloa, Salailua and Saleaula and was educated at Faleata College.

She contested the 2019 Junior World Weightlifting Championships, coming 5th in the 81 kg category. At the 2019 Pacific Games in Apia she won three gold medals in the 81 kg division. She also won gold in the junior and senior 81 kg categories at the 2019 Oceania Weightlifting Championships and 2019 Commonwealth Weightlifting Championships, which were held concurrently.
