= Kaity Fassina =

Australian weightlifter (born 1990)

Personal information
- Nationality: Australian
- Born: Kaitlyn Jade Judges Fassina; 17 July 1990 (age 35) Hobart, Australia

Sport
- Sport: Weightlifting
Medal record
Women's weightlifting
Representing Australia
Commonwealth Games
| Silver medal – second place | 2018 Gold Coast | 90 kg |
Pacific Games
| Gold medal – first place | 2019 Apia (Note: Oceania Championships also) | 87 kg |
Commonwealth Championships
| Silver medal – second place | 2016 Penang | +75 kg |
| Silver medal – second place | 2017 Gold Coast | 90 kg |
| Silver medal – second place | 2019 Apia | 87 kg |
Arafura Games
| Gold medal – first place | 2019 Darwin | 87 kg |

Kaitlyn Jade Judges Fassina (born 17 July 1990) is an Australian weightlifter. She competed in the women's 90 kg event at the 2018 Commonwealth Games, winning the silver medal.

Medalbox note
