= Weightlifting at the 2018 Commonwealth Games – Men's 105 kg =

Weightlifting – Men's 105 kg at the 2018 Commonwealth Games
- Venue: Carrara Sports and Leisure Centre
- Dates: 9 April 2018
- Competitors: 14 from 14 nations

Medalists
gold medal	Sanele Mao	Samoa
silver medal	Pardeep Singh	India
bronze medal	Owen Boxall	England

The Men's 105 kg weightlifting event at the 2018 Commonwealth Games took place at the Carrara Sports and Leisure Centre on 9 April 2018. The weightlifter from Samoa won the gold, with a combined lift of 360 kg.

== Records ==
Prior to this competition, the existing world, Commonwealth and Games records were as follows:

World record	Snatch	Andrei Aramnau (BLR)	200 kg	Beijing, China	18 August 2008
World record	Clean & Jerk	Ilya Ilyin (KAZ)	246 kg	Grozny, Russia	12 December 2015
World record	Total	Ilya Ilyin (KAZ)	437 kg	Grozny, Russia	12 December 2015
Commonwealth record	Snatch	Aleksander Karapetyan (AUS)	175 kg	Melbourne, Australia	30 October 2004
Commonwealth record	Clean & Jerk	Aleksander Karapetyan (AUS)	210 kg	Melbourne, Australia	17 March 2002
Commonwealth record	Total	Akos Sandor (CAN)	377 kg	Shreveport, United States	9 November 2001
Games record	Snatch	Akos Sandor (CAN)	167 kg	Kuala Lumpur, Malaysia	19 September 1998
Games record	Clean & Jerk	Delroy McQueen (ENG)	210 kg	Manchester, England	2 August 2002
Games record	Total	Delroy McQueen (ENG)	375 kg	Manchester, England	2 August 2002

== Schedule ==
All times are Australian Eastern Standard Time (UTC+10)

Date	Time	Round
Monday, 9 April 2018	09:42	Final

== Results ==
Rank	Athlete	Body weight (kg)	Snatch (kg)				Clean & Jerk (kg)				Total
Rank	Athlete	Body weight (kg)	1	2	3	Result	1	2	3	Result	Total
1st place, gold medalist(s)	Sanele Mao (SAM)	103.71	150	~~154~~	154	154	200	206	~~211~~	206	360
2nd place, silver medalist(s)	Pardeep Singh (IND)	102.40	~~148~~	148	152	152	200	~~209~~	~~211~~	200	352
3rd place, bronze medalist(s)	Owen Boxall (ENG)	104.84	~~152~~	~~152~~	152	152	191	197	199	199	351
4	Richmond Osarfo (GHA)	104.10	~~148~~	148	152	152	190	~~196~~	198	198	350
5	David Katoatau (KIR)	101.07	~~140~~	140	~~144~~	140	~~193~~	193	200	200	340
6	Ryan Meidl (CAN)	104.63	145	~~150~~	~~150~~	145	180	186	~~191~~	186	331
7	Jordan Sakkas (WAL)	104.82	140	~~145~~	~~145~~	140	176	180	~~183~~	180	320
8	Ridge Barredo (AUS)	100.28	138	~~144~~	~~144~~	138	~~175~~	~~175~~	175	175	313
9	Saman Abeywickrama (SRI)	104.85	125	130	~~134~~	130	160	~~170~~	~~170~~	160	290
10	Sateki Langi (TGA)	104.38	115	~~120~~	~~120~~	115	141	~~146~~	~~150~~	141	256
11	Dereck Come (SEY)	99.33	110	~~115~~	~~120~~	110	141	145	~~150~~	145	255
	Ivorn McKnee (BAR)	104.40	140	145	~~150~~	145	~~182~~	~~182~~	~~182~~	–	–
	Stanislav Chalaev (NZL)	104.48	~~147~~	148	~~150~~	148	-	-	-	–	DNF
	Zachary Courtney (SCO)	104.77	130	~~136~~	~~136~~	130	-	-	-	–	DNF
