= Weightlifting at the 2026 Commonwealth Games – Men's 71 kg =

Weightlifting – Men's 71 kg at the 2026 Commonwealth Games
- Venue: Scottish Event Campus
- Dates: 27 July 2026
- Competitors: 11 from 11 nations

Medalists
| gold medal | Edidiong Umoafia | Nigeria |
| silver medal | John Tafi | Samoa |
| bronze medal | Ezekiel Moses | Nauru |

The Men's 71 kg weightlifting event at the 2026 Commonwealth Games will take place at the SEC Armadillo, Glasgow on 27 July 2026. Nigeria's Edidiong Umoafia won the gold medal ahead of John Tafi from Samoa who took silver with Ezekiel Moses of Nauru claiming the bronze.

== Qualification ==
A total of 176 weightlifters (88 per gender) qualify to compete at the Games. Nations may earn one quota per weight class, allocated as follows:

- Automatic Qualification – Host CGA (1 per event)
- Direct Qualification – 2025 Commonwealth Weightlifting Champions (1 per event)
- IWF Commonwealth Ranking List (Ranking Period: 01 June 2025 – 18 May 2026) (8 per event)
- Bipartite Invitation (1 per event)

The following lifters qualified in the Men's 71 kg class:

| Means of qualification | Quotas | Qualified |
|---|---|---|
| Host Nation | 1 | Corey Duncan (SCO) |
| 2025 Commonwealth Championships | ~~1~~ 0* | ~~Ajith Narayana (IND)~~ |
| IWF Commonwealth Rankings | ~~8~~ 9 | Edidiong Umoafia (NGR); John Tafi (SAM); Ezekiel Moses (NRU); Harrison McGrogan (NIR); Jonathan Chin (ENG); ~~Poama Qaqa (FIJ)~~; Matt Darsigny (CAN); ~~Michael Farmer (WAL)~~; Indika Dissanayake (SRI); Kester Loy (SGP) |
| Bipartite Invitation | 1 | Emmanuel Boateng (GHA) |
| TOTAL | 11 | |

*Indian weightlifter Ajith Narayana tested positive for banned substances and therefore was banned from competing. Narayana's quota spot was reallocated to the next best athlete in the rankings, Indika Dissanayake of Sri Lanka.

== Schedule ==
All times are British Summer Time (UTC+1)

| Date | Time | Round |
|---|---|---|
| 27 July 2026 | 09:30 | Final |

== Competition ==
| Rank | Athlete | Body weight (kg) | Snatch (kg) | | | | Clean & Jerk (kg) | | | | Total |
| Rank | Athlete | Body weight (kg) | 1 | 2 | 3 | Result | 1 | 2 | 3 | Result | Total |
|---|---|---|---|---|---|---|---|---|---|---|---|
| 1st place, gold medalist(s) | Edidiong Umoafia (NGR) | | 145 | 147 | ~~150~~ | 147 GR | 168 | 172 | ~~175~~ | 172 | 319 GR |
| 2nd place, silver medalist(s) | John Tafi (SAM) | | 138 | 142 | ~~146~~ | 142 | 172 | ~~178~~ | ~~178~~ | 172 GR | 314 |
| 3rd place, bronze medalist(s) | Ezekiel Moses (NRU) | | 135 | 138 | 140 | 140 | 163 | 170 | ~~175~~ | 170 | 310 |
| 4 | Jonathan Chin (ENG) | | 126 | 129 | ~~133~~ | 129 | 165 | 170 | ~~175~~ | 170 | 299 |
| 5 | Harrison McGrogan (NIR) | | 128 | ~~133~~ | ~~133~~ | 128 | 160 | ~~167~~ | ~~172~~ | 160 | 288 |
| 6 | Matt Darsigny (CAN) | | 125 | ~~130~~ | 130 | 130 | 155 | ~~160~~ | ~~160~~ | 155 | 285 |
| 7 | Emmanuel Boateng (GHA) | | 120 | 124 | 127 | 127 | 150 | ~~155~~ | 155 | 155 | 282 |
| 8 | Kester Loy (SGP) | | 115 | 120 | ~~123~~ | 120 | 145 | ~~130~~ | ~~130~~ | 145 | 265 |
| – | Indika Dissanayake (SRI) | | ~~130~~ | ~~130~~ | ~~133~~ | – | – | – | – | – | – |
| – | Corey Duncan (SCO) | | ~~130~~ | ~~130~~ | ~~130~~ | – | – | – | – | – | – |
