= Cameron McTaggart =

New Zealand weightlifter (born 1997)

Personal information
- Full name: Cameron David McTaggart
- Born: 30 September 1997 (age 28) Southport, Queensland, Australia
- Weight: 80.80 kg (178 lb)
- Relative: Olivia McTaggart (sister)

Sport
- Country: New Zealand
- Sport: Weightlifting
- Event: –81 kg
Medal record
Men's weightlifting
Representing New Zealand
Commonwealth Games
Silver medal – second place	2026 Glasgow	88 kg
Pacific Games
Gold medal – first place	2019 Apia	81 kg
Commonwealth Championships
Bronze medal – third place	2019 Apia	81 kg
Oceania Championships
Gold medal – first place	2019 Apia	81 kg
Gold medal – first place	2026 Apia	88 kg
Bronze medal – third place	2017 Gold Coast	77 kg

Cameron David McTaggart (born 30 September 1997) is a New Zealand weightlifter. He won the gold medal in the men's 81 kg event at the 2019 Pacific Games held in Apia, Samoa.

In 2018, McTaggart represented New Zealand at the Commonwealth Games held in Gold Coast, Australia. He finished in 7th place in the men's 77 kg event.

McTaggart represented New Zealand at the 2020 Summer Olympics in Tokyo, Japan. He competed in the men's 81 kg event.

He competed in the men's 81 kg event at the 2022 Commonwealth Games held in Birmingham, England.
