= Ezekiel Moses =

Nauruan weightlifter (born 2001)

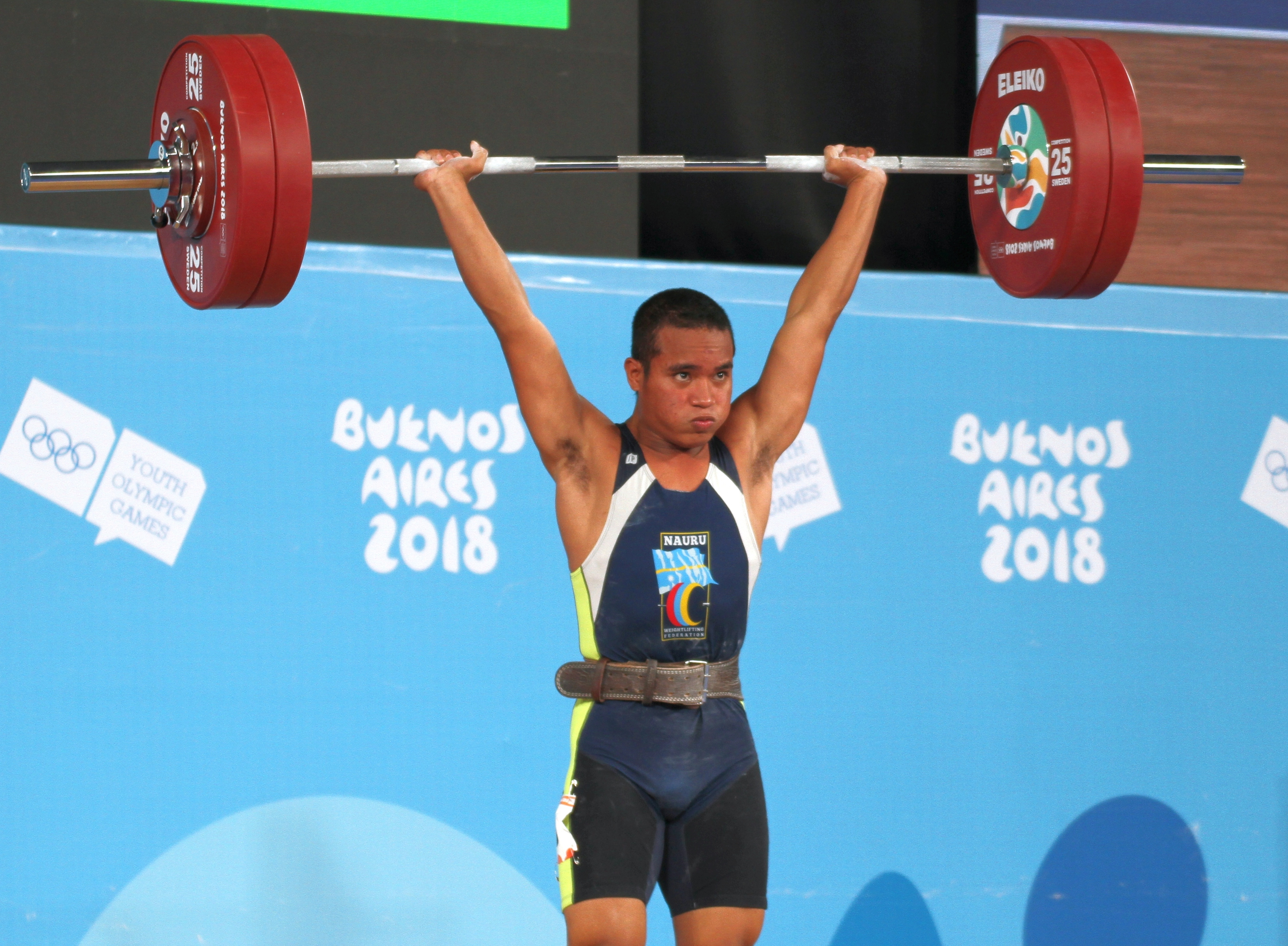
- Moses at the 2018 Summer Youth Olympics

Personal information
- Born: 2 July 2001 (age 25)

Sport
- Country: Nauru
- Sport: Weightlifting
- Weight class: 71 kg
Medal record
Men's weightlifting
Representing Nauru
Commonwealth Games
| Bronze medal – third place | 2026 Glasgow | 71 kg |
Oceania Championships
| Silver medal – second place | 2021 | 73 kg |
| Silver medal – second place | 2025 Meyuns | 71 kg clean & jerk |
| Silver medal – second place | 2026 Apia | 71 kg |
| Bronze medal – third place | 2018 Le Mont-Dore | 62 kg |
| Bronze medal – third place | 2019 Apia | 67 kg |

Ezekiel Moses (born 2 July 2001) is a Nauruan weightlifter.

== Career ==
In July 2026, he competed at the 2026 Commonwealth Games and won a bronze medal in the 71 kg event. This was Nauru's first medal of the 2026 Games.
