= Sarah Cochrane =

Australian weightlifter (born 1989)

Personal information
- Born: 23 September 1989 (age 36) Rockhampton, Queensland

Sport
- Country: Australia
- Sport: Weightlifting
Medal record
Women's weightlifting
Representing Australia
Commonwealth Games
Silver medal – second place	2022 Birmingham	64 kg
Pacific Games
Silver medal – second place	2019 Apia	64 kg
Commonwealth Championships
Gold medal – first place	2021 Tashkent	64 kg
Bronze medal – third place	2019 Apia	64 kg
Oceania Championships
Gold medal – first place	2021 (held online)	64 kg
Silver medal – second place	2019 Apia	64 kg
Arafura Games
Bronze medal – third place	2019 Darwin	64 kg

Sarah Maureen Cochrane (born 23 September 1989) is an Australian weightlifter. She won the silver medal in the women's 64 kg event at the 2022 Commonwealth Games held in Birmingham, England. She also won the silver medal in the women's 64 kg event at the 2019 Pacific Games held in Apia, Samoa.

== Early life ==
Cochrane was born in Rockhampton, Queensland where she graduated from Glenmore State High School. While living in Rockhampton, Cochrane reached top levels in women's artistic gymnastics while training at Victoria Park Gymnastics Club where she became a coach after achieving her own goals.

In 2008, Cochrane relocated with her family to Townsville where she worked as a coach for Gymnastics Townsville. She also became involved with CrossFit which is where her coach Bryce Knight first encouraged her to compete in weightlifting.

Cochrane graduated from James Cook University in 2012 with a degree in speech pathology. She has established her own business which specialises in working with children and young adults who use augmentative and alternative communication.

== Career ==
Representing Australia as a weightlifter for the first time in 2019, Cochrane just missed out on a spot at the 2020 Summer Olympics.

Cochrane competed in the women's 64 kg event at the 2021 World Weightlifting Championships held in Tashkent, Uzbekistan. She finished in 7th place in this competition. The 2021 Commonwealth Weightlifting Championships were also held at the same time and her total result gave her the gold medal in this event. As a result, she qualified to compete at the 2022 Commonwealth Games in Birmingham, England.

== Achievements ==
Year	Venue	Weight	Snatch (kg)				Clean & Jerk (kg)				Total	Rank
Year	Venue	Weight	1	2	3	Rank	1	2	3	Rank	Total	Rank
World Championships
2021	Tashkent, Uzbekistan	64 kg	90	95	~~100~~	6	110	115	~~121~~	8	210	7
2022	Bogotá, Colombia	64 kg	93	98	~~101~~	6	~~113~~	113	~~118~~	12	211	6
Commonwealth Games
2022	Birmingham, England	64 kg	93	97	100	—N/a	112	116	~~118~~	—N/a	216	2nd place, silver medalist(s)
Commonwealth Championships
2019	Apia, Samoa	64 kg	88	92	~~96~~		108	~~112~~	112		204	3rd place, bronze medalist(s)
2021	Tashkent, Uzbekistan	64 kg	90	95	~~100~~		110	115	~~121~~		210	1st place, gold medalist(s)
