= Maeu Nanai Livi =

Samoan weightlifter

Sport
- Country: Samoa
- Sport: Weightlifter
Medal record
Men's Weightlifter
Representing Samoa
Pacific Games
Bronze medal – third place	2019 Apia	96kg snatch
Bronze medal – third place	2019 Apia	96kg clean & jerk
Bronze medal – third place	2019 Apia	96kg total
Oceania Weightlifting Championships
Silver medal – second place	2019 Apia	96kg
Commonwealth Weightlifting Championships
Bronze medal – third place	2019 Apia	96kg
Commonwealth Youth Games
Gold medal – first place	2015 Apia	85kg

Maeu Nanai Livi is a Samoan weightlifter who has represented Samoa at the Commonwealth Youth Games and Pacific Games.

At the 2015 Commonwealth Youth Games in Apia he won gold in the 85 kg division. In June 2019 he was part of the Samoan team for the 2019 Junior World Weightlifting Championships.

At the 2019 Pacific Games in Apia he won three bronze medals in the 96 kg division, as well as silver at the 2019 Oceania Weightlifting Championships and bronze at the 2019 Commonwealth Weightlifting Championships.
