= Kanah Andrews-Nahu =

New Zealand weightlifter (born 2001)

Personal information
- Full name: Kanah Shenelle Andrews-Nahu
- Born: 18 January 2001 (age 25) Auckland, New Zealand
- Height: 159 cm (5 ft 3 in)

Sport
- Country: New Zealand
- Sport: Weightlifting
Medal record
Women's weightlifting
Representing New Zealand
Pacific Games
Gold medal – first place	2019 Apia	76 kg
Commonwealth Championships
Bronze medal – third place	2019 Apia	76 kg
Oceania Championships
Gold medal – first place	2018 Le Mont-Dore	75 kg
Gold medal – first place	2019 Apia	76 kg
Summer Youth Olympics
Bronze medal – third place	2018 Buenos Aires	+63 kg
Junior World Championships
Bronze medal – third place	2019 Suva	76 kg

Kanah Shenelle Andrews-Nahu (born 18 January 2001) is a New Zealand weightlifter. She won the bronze medal in the girls' +63 kg event at the 2018 Summer Youth Olympics held in Buenos Aires, Argentina. At the time, she finished in 4th place but Supatchanin Khamhaeng of Thailand was stripped of her gold medal after testing positive for a banned substance.

== Career ==
At the 2019 Junior World Weightlifting Championships held in Suva, Fiji, she won the gold medal in the women's 76 kg Snatch event and the bronze medal in the women's 76 kg event. As a result, she became the first weightlifter from New Zealand to win a gold medal at this event. A month later, at the 2019 Pacific Games held in Apia, Samoa, she won the gold medal in the women's 76 kg event.

She represented New Zealand at the 2020 Summer Olympics in Tokyo, Japan. She finished in 13th place in the women's 87 kg event.

== Achievements ==
Year	Venue	Weight	Snatch (kg)				Clean & Jerk (kg)				Total	Rank
Year	Venue	Weight	1	2	3	Rank	1	2	3	Rank	Total	Rank
Summer Olympics
2021	Tokyo, Japan	87 kg	94	~~98~~	~~100~~	—N/a	105	112	~~120~~	—N/a	206	13
