= Megan Signal =

New Zealand weightlifter (born 1990)

Personal information
- Full name: Megan Ann Signal
- Born: 7 February 1990 (age 36) Hamilton, New Zealand
- Weight: 76 kg (168 lb)

Sport
- Country: New Zealand
- Sport: Weightlifting
- Event: 76kg
Medal record
Women's weightlifting
Representing New Zealand
Pacific Games
Bronze medal – third place	2019 Apia	64 kg (Note: Also clean & jerk silver and snatch bronze)
Oceania Championships
Bronze medal – third place	2019 Apia	64 kg

Megan Ann Signal (born 17 February 1990) is a New Zealand weightlifter who qualified for the 2020 Summer Olympics in the women's 76 kg category.

== Career ==
Signal began weightlifting in 2013 at the FS Olympic Weightlifting Club in Auckland, New Zealand, which she attributed to her CrossFit interest. She holds two Oceania records in the 71 kg class and won medals at the 2019 Pacific Games and Oceania Weightlifting Championships.

She withdrew from the Tokyo Olympics without competing, due to a shoulder injury.

Medalbox note
