= John Tafi =

Samoan weightlifter (born 2002)

Personal information
- Full name: John Lautafi Tafi
- Born: 10 May 2002 (age 24)

Sport
- Country: Samoa
- Sport: Weightlifting
Medal record
Men's Weightlifting
Representing Samoa
Commonwealth Games
Silver medal – second place	2026 Glasgow	71 kg
Pacific Games
Gold medal – first place	2025 Koror	71 kg
Gold medal – first place	2023 Honiara	73 kg
Bronze medal – third place	2019 Apia	61kg
Oceania Championships
Gold medal – first place	2025 Meyuns	71 kg
Gold medal – first place	2021	73 kg
Gold medal – first place	2026 Apia	71 kg
Bronze medal – third place	2019 Apia	61 kg

John Lautafi Tafi (born 10 May 2002) is a Samoan weightlifter who has represented Samoa at the Pacific Games and Commonwealth Games.

Tafi is from Lotopa on Upolu.

At the 2019 Pacific Games, Oceania & Commonwealth Championships in Apia he won 2 gold, 2 silver, and 9 bronze medals.

He set a new Oceania record in the 73 kg division at the 2021 Oceania Weightlifting Championships, with a snatch of 136 kg. At the 2022 Oceania Junior Championships he broke another three records, with a snatch of 133 kg, jerk of 165 kg, and total of 298 kg.

In 2022, he was one of six Samoan weightlifters to qualify for the 2022 Commonwealth Games in Birmingham, England. He competed in the men's 73 kg event.

At the 2025 Pacific Mini Games in Meyuns, Palau he won three gold medals and was named best overall male athlete.
