= Vaipava Ioane =

Samoan weightlifter (born 1988)

Personal information
- Nationality: Samoan
- Born: 14 April 1988 (age 38) Tuasivi, Samoa
- Weight: 62 kg (137 lb)

Sport
- Sport: Weightlifting
- Event: 62 kg
Medal record
Men's weightlifting
Representing American Samoa
Oceania Championships
| Silver medal – second place | 2010 Suva | 56 kg |
Representing Samoa
Commonwealth Games
| Silver medal – second place | 2022 Birmingham | 67 kg |
| Bronze medal – third place | 2014 Glasgow | 62 kg |
Pacific Games
| Gold medal – first place | 2023 Honiara | 67 kg |
| Gold medal – first place | 2019 Apia | 67 kg |
| Silver medal – second place | 2015 Port Moresby | 62 kg |
Commonwealth Championships
| Gold medal – first place | 2013 Penang | 62 kg |
| Gold medal – first place | 2017 Gold Coast | 69 kg |
| Gold medal – first place | 2019 Apia | 67 kg |
| Gold medal – first place | 2023 India | 67 kg |
Oceania Championships
| Gold medal – first place | 2013 Brisbane | 62 kg |
| Gold medal – first place | 2014 Le Mont-Dore | 62 kg |
| Gold medal – first place | 2017 Gold Coast | 69 kg |
| Gold medal – first place | 2019 Apia | 67 kg |
| Gold medal – first place | 2021 | 67 kg |
| Silver medal – second place | 2015 Port Moresby | 62 kg |
| Silver medal – second place | 2016 Suva | 62 kg |
- Updated on 21 November 2023

Vaipava Nevo Ioane (born 14 April 1988) is a Samoan weightlifter. He competed in the men's 62 kg event at the 2014 Commonwealth Games where he won a bronze medal. He represented his country at the 2016 Summer Olympics.

At the 2022 Commonwealth Games in Birmingham he won silver in the 67kg class. He announced his retirement after the games, but in January 2023 announced he would compete at the Pacific Elite International weightlifting tournament. He subsequently competed in the 2023 Commonwealth Weightlifting Championships in India, winning gold in the 67kg category.

At the 2023 Pacific Games in Honiara he won three gold medals and set a new Oceania record.
