= Feagaiga Stowers =

Samoan weightlifter (born 2000)

Personal information
- Nationality: Samoan
- Born: 17 November 2000 (age 25)

Sport
- Sport: Weightlifting
Medal record
Women's weightlifting
Representing Samoa
Commonwealth Games
Gold medal – first place	2018 Gold Coast	+90 kg
Silver medal – second place	2022 Birmingham	+87 kg
Pacific Games
Silver medal – second place	2019 Apia	+87 kg
Commonwealth Championships
Silver medal – second place	2019 Apia	+87 kg
Bronze medal – third place	2017 Gold Coast	+90 kg
Oceania Championships
Gold medal – first place	2021	+87 kg
Silver medal – second place	2019 Apia	+87 kg
Bronze medal – third place	2017 Gold Coast	+90 kg
Arafura Games
Gold medal – first place	2019 Darwin	+87 kg
Commonwealth Youth Games
Silver medal – second place	2015 Apia	+69 kg

Feagaiga Stowers (born 17 November 2000) is a Samoan weightlifter who has won a gold medal at the 2018 Commonwealth Games. She is the older sister of weightlifter Seine Stowers.

Stowers is from Faʻala in Savaiʻi and is a survivor of abuse. While being housed by the Samoa Victim Support Group she was encouraged to try weightlifting and was trained by Tuaopepe Jerry Wallwork. She competed in the women's +90 kg event at the 2018 Commonwealth Games, winning the gold medal.

In July 2019 she was flagbearer for the Samoan team at the 2019 Pacific Games.

At the 2022 Oceania Online Cup she set three new Oceania records and won best overall female.

She was selected as the only female weightlifter in the Samoan team for the 2022 Commonwealth Games in Birmingham. She won silver in the women's over-87 kg category.

== Major results ==
Year	Venue	Weight	Snatch (kg)					Clean & Jerk (kg)					Total	Rank
Year	Venue	Weight	1	2	3	Result	Rank	1	2	3	Result	Rank	Total	Rank
Representing Samoa
World Championships
2019	Pattaya, Thailand	+87 kg	112	116	~~119~~	116	10	141	~~146~~	~~146~~	141	16	257	14
Junior World Championships
2019	Suva, Fiji	+87 kg	117	121	124	124	1st place, gold medalist(s)	146	~~151~~	151	151	2nd place, silver medalist(s)	275	2nd place, silver medalist(s)
Commonwealth Games
2018	Gold Coast, Australia	+90 kg	108	113	~~120~~	113	2	135	140	~~145~~	140	2	253	1st place, gold medalist(s)
Oceania Championships
2019	Apia, Samoa	+87 kg	113	119	~~126~~	119	2	142	~~147~~	~~150~~	142	1	261	2nd place, silver medalist(s)
2017	Gold Coast, Australia	+90 kg	~~102~~	102	107	107	3	129	~~135~~	136	136	3	243	3rd place, bronze medalist(s)
2016	Suva, Fiji	+75 kg	83	86	~~88~~	86	6	105	110	~~113~~	110	5	196	5
Commonwealth Championships
2019	Apia, Samoa	+87 kg	113	119	~~126~~	119	2	142	~~147~~	~~150~~	142	1	261	2nd place, silver medalist(s)
2017	Gold Coast, Australia	+90 kg	~~102~~	102	107	107	3	129	~~135~~	136	136	3	263	3rd place, bronze medalist(s)
Pacific Games
2019	Apia, Samoa	+87 kg	113	119	~~126~~	119	2nd place, silver medalist(s)	142	~~147~~	~~150~~	142	3rd place, bronze medalist(s)	261	2nd place, silver medalist(s)
Arafura Games
2019	Darwin, Australia	+87 kg	~~110~~	110	115	115	1	140	~~144~~	~~144~~	140	2	255	1st place, gold medalist(s)
Commonwealth Youth Games
2015	Apia, Samoa	+69 kg	72	76	~~80~~	76	3	93	96	~~102~~	96	2	172	2nd place, silver medalist(s)
