= Matthew Lydement =

Australian weightlifter (born 1994)

Personal information
- Born: 15 January 1994 (age 32) Queensland, Australia

Sport
- Country: Australia
- Sport: Weightlifting
Medal record
Men's weightlifting
Representing Australia
Commonwealth Championships
Bronze medal – third place	2019 Apia	109 kg
Oceania Championships
Silver medal – second place	2021	109 kg

Matthew Lydement (born 15 January 1994) is an Australian weightlifter.

After enduring several injuries playing cricket, rugby union and Australian Rules, Lydement decided to take up weightlifting. He joined the Barbell Club in Brisbane.

At the 2017 Asian Indoor and Martial Arts Games held in Ashgabat, Turkmenistan, he competed in the men's 105 kg event.

In 2019, he represented Australia at the Pacific Games and he competed in the men's 109 kg event.

Lydement represented Australia at the 2020 Summer Olympics in Tokyo, Japan. He competed in the men's 109 kg. He finished outside the top ten. Australia at the 2020 Summer Olympics details his performance in depth.

He is coached by Damon Kelly.
