= Aisake Tuitupou =

Sport
- Country: Tonga
- Sport: Weightlifting
Medal record
Men's Weightlifting
Representing Tonga
Pacific Games
| Gold medal – first place | 2019 Apia | +109kg total |
| Gold medal – first place | 2019 Apia | +109kg clean & jerk |
| Bronze medal – third place | 2019 Apia | +109kg snatch |
Representing New Zealand
Oceania Weightlifting Championships
| Silver medal – second place | 2017 Gold Coast | +105kg clean & jerk |
| Bronze medal – third place | 2017 Gold Coast | +105kg total |

Aisake Tuitupou is a Tongan New Zealander weightlifter who has represented New Zealand at the Oceania Weightlifting Championships and Tonga at the Pacific Games.

Tuitupou works as a schoolteacher in Auckland, New Zealand.

He competed in the 2017 IWF Australian Open for New Zealand. Later that year he competed in the 2017 Oceania Weightlifting Championships for New Zealand, winning silver in the clean & jerk, and bronze for total lift. At the 2019 Pacific Games in Apia he competed for Tonga, winning bronze in the over-109 kg snatch, but gold in the clean & jerk and total, after Lauititi Lui and David Liti missed all three of their attempts.
