= Jack Opeloge =

Samoan weightlifter (born 2000)

Personal information
- Full name: Jack Hitila Opeloge
- Nationality: Samoan
- Born: 21 August 2000 (age 26) Australia

Sport
- Country: Samoa
- Sport: Weightlifting
Medal record
Men's Weightlifting
Representing Samoa
Commonwealth Games
| Silver medal – second place | 2022 Birmingham | 109 kg |
Pacific Games
| Gold medal – first place | 2019 Apia | 81kg |
| Silver medal – second place | 2019 Apia | 81kg |
| Bronze medal – third place | 2019 Apia | 81kg |
Oceania Championships
| Gold medal – first place | 2021 | 102 kg |
| Gold medal – first place | 2025 Meyuns | 110 kg |
| Gold medal – first place | 2026 Apia | 110 kg |

Jack Hitila Opeloge (born 21 August 2000) is a Samoan weightlifter who has represented Samoa at the Pacific Games and Commonwealth Games.

Opeloge comes from a weightlifting family. His brother Niusila and his sister Ele both won gold at the 2010 Commonwealth Games, in New Delhi, while his brother Don Opeloge won silver at the 2018 Commonwealth Games.

At the 2019 Pacific Games in Apia he won a gold, silver and bronze medal in the 81 kg division. At the 2021 Oceania Weightlifting Championships he won gold in the 102 kg division. At the 2022 Oceania Online Cup he came second to his brother Don.

In 2022 he was one of six Samoan weightlifters to qualify for the 2022 Commonwealth Games. He won silver in the 109 kg division after the cancellation of the 102 kg division.
