= Don Opeloge =

Samoan weightlifter (born 1999)

Personal information
- Born: 13 May 1999 (age 27)

Sport
- Country: Samoa
- Sport: Weightlifting
Medal record
Men's weightlifting
Representing Samoa
Commonwealth Games
Gold medal – first place	2022 Birmingham	96 kg
Silver medal – second place	2018 Gold Coast	85 kg
Pacific Games
Gold medal – first place	2019 Apia	89 kg
Gold medal – first place	2023 Honiara	102 kg
Commonwealth Championships
Gold medal – first place	2019 Apia	89 kg
Silver medal – second place	2017 Gold Coast	85 kg
Oceania Championships
Gold medal – first place	2017 Gold Coast	85 kg
Gold medal – first place	2018 Le Mont-Dore	85 kg
Gold medal – first place	2019 Apia	89 kg
Gold medal – first place	2021	96 kg
Gold medal – first place	2023 Honiara	102 kg
Gold medal – first place	2024 Auckland	102 kg

Don Opeloge (born 13 May 1999) is a Samoan weightlifter. He won the gold medal in the men's 96 kg event at the 2022 Commonwealth Games held in Birmingham, England.

== Career ==
Opeloge comes from a weightlifting family. His uncle Niusila and his aunty Ele both won gold at the 2010 Commonwealth Games, in New Delhi.

At the 2017 Asian Indoor and Martial Arts Games held in Ashgabat, Turkmenistan, he finished in 9th place in the men's 85 kg event. He won the silver medal in the men's 85 kg event at the 2018 Commonwealth Games held in Gold Coast, Australia.

In 2019, Opeloge won the gold medal in the men's 89 kg event at the Junior World Weightlifting Championships held in Suva, Fiji. A month later, he represented Samoa at the 2019 Pacific Games and he won the gold medal in the men's 89 kg event. The 2019 Commonwealth Weightlifting Championships were also held at the same time and his total result also gave him the gold medal in this event. He qualified for the 2020 Olympic games, but was unable to attend due to the COVID-19 pandemic.

In December 2022, he was named by the Samoa Observer as one of its people of the year.

At the 2023 World Weightlifting Championships in September 2023, he set a new commonwealth record and qualified for the 2024 Summer Olympics in Paris.

In August 2024, Opeloge competed in the men's 102 kg event at the 2024 Summer Olympics held in Paris, France. He failed three attempts to lift 170 kg in the Snatch and he did not compete in the Clean & Jerk.

== Major results ==
Year	Venue	Weight	Snatch (kg)				Clean & Jerk (kg)				Total	Rank
Year	Venue	Weight	1	2	3	Rank	1	2	3	Rank	Total	Rank
Summer Olympics
2024	Paris, France	102 kg	~~170~~	~~170~~	~~170~~	—N/a	—	—	—	—N/a	DNF	—
World Championships
2018	Ashgabat, Turkmenistan	89 kg	142	~~147~~	~~147~~	24	180	185	~~190~~	19	327	22
2019	Pattaya, Thailand	96 kg	151	~~156~~	~~156~~	31	190	200	~~205~~	13	351	21
2023	Riyadh, Saudi Arabia	102 kg	166	171	~~175~~	12	208	215	~~220~~	6	386	8
IWF World Cup
2019	Tianjin, China	96 kg	~~155~~	~~155~~	155	6	195	~~202~~	202	4	357	6
2024	Phuket, Thailand	102 kg	~~170~~	~~170~~	170	15	~~215~~	215	221	2nd place, silver medalist(s)	391	6
Oceania Championships
2017	Gold Coast, Australia	85 kg	140	146	~~150~~	1st place, gold medalist(s)	173	~~180~~	186	1st place, gold medalist(s)	332	1st place, gold medalist(s)
2018	Mont-Dore, New Caledonia	85 kg	137	~~145~~	145	1st place, gold medalist(s)	180	~~185~~	~~185~~	1st place, gold medalist(s)	325	1st place, gold medalist(s)
2019	Apia, Samoa	89 kg	145	~~151~~	~~157~~	1st place, gold medalist(s)	~~185~~	185	193	1st place, gold medalist(s)	338	1st place, gold medalist(s)
2021	Various, Oceania	96 kg	~~159~~	159	~~165~~	1st place, gold medalist(s)	200	~~211~~	~~211~~	1st place, gold medalist(s)	359	1st place, gold medalist(s)
2024	Auckland, New Zealand	102 kg	170	175	~~180~~	1st place, gold medalist(s)	210	215	~~220~~	1st place, gold medalist(s)	390	1st place, gold medalist(s)
Pacific Games
2019	Apia, Samoa	89 kg	145	~~151~~	~~157~~	1st place, gold medalist(s)	~~185~~	185	193	1st place, gold medalist(s)	338	1st place, gold medalist(s)
2023	Honiara, Solomon Islands	102 kg	165	~~173~~	~~173~~	1st place, gold medalist(s)	205	214	~~220~~	1st place, gold medalist(s)	379	1st place, gold medalist(s)
