= Sanele Mao =

Samoan weightlifter (born 1985)

Personal information
- Nationality: Samoan
- Born: 9 September 1985 (age 41) Vaotupua, Falealupo, Savaii
- Years active: 9 Years
- Weight: 93.18 kg (205.4 lb)

Sport
- Country: Samoa
- Sport: Weightlifting
- Weight class: 109 kg
- Club: -
- Team: National team
- Coached by: Tuaopepe Asiata Jerry Wallwork

Achievements and titles
- Personal best: 220 kg
Medal record
Men's weightlifting
Representing Samoa
Commonwealth Games
Gold medal – first place	2018 Gold Coast	105 kg
Pacific Games
Gold medal – first place	2019 Apia	109 kg
Commonwealth Championships
Gold medal – first place	2019 Apia	109 kg
Silver medal – second place	2017 Gold Coast	105 kg
Oceania Championships
Gold medal – first place	2017 Gold Coast	105 kg
Gold medal – first place	2019 Apia	109 kg
Gold medal – first place	2026 Apia	+110 kg
Silver medal – second place	2016 Suva	105 kg

Sanele Mao (born 9 September 1985) is a Samoan weightlifter.

Mao is from Vaitele and Falealupo. He initially pursued a career in bodybuilding, representing Samoa at a competition in New Caledonia and winning silver. In 2012 he switched to weightlifting. He participated at the 2014 Commonwealth Games in the 94 kg event. He won the silver medal at the 2016 Oceania Weightlifting Championships, lifting a total of 335 kg.

Mao won Samoa’s first gold medal at the 2018 Commonwealth Games. Mao won in the final of the 105 kg men's division during the Weightlifting on day five of the Gold Coast 2018 Commonwealth Games at Carrara Sports and Leisure Centre. In 2019 he competed at the 2019 Pacific Games, winning three gold medals. In 2020 he won the men's division in the Oceania Weightlifting Federation Online Cup.

He competed again in the 2026 Commonwealth Games in Glasgow, but did not finish.

== Major competitions ==
Year	Venue	Weight	Snatch (kg)				Clean & Jerk (kg)				Total	Rank
Year	Venue	Weight	1	2	3	Rank	1	2	3	Rank	Total	Rank
Commonwealth Games
2014	Glasgow, Scotland	94 kg	125	130	135	—N/a	170	~~177~~	~~180~~	—N/a	305	9
2018	Gold Coast, Australia	105 kg	150	~~154~~	154	1	200	206	~~211~~	1	360	1st place, gold medalist(s)
