= Tuanaimato =

Geographical area near Apia, Samoa

Coordinates: 13°51′11.29″S 171°47′40.46″W

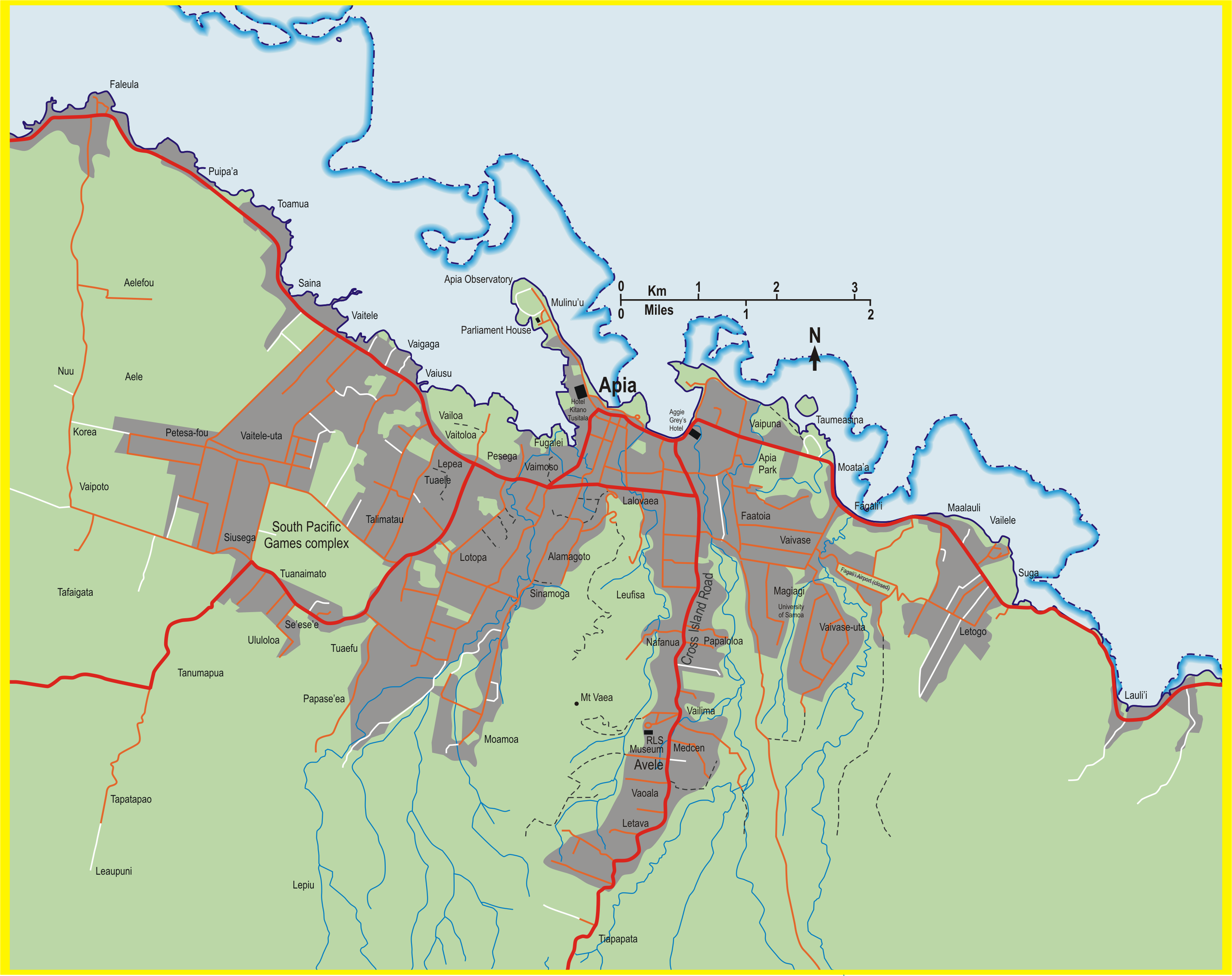
Map of Apia showing Tuanamato in the western part of the city

Tuanaimato is a geographical area near Apia, Samoa.

It is the site of the one hundred acre Faleata Sporting Complex which houses, among other facilities, a 12,000 seater soccer stadium (home of Tuanaimato Breeze, a Samoan soccer team), a baseball stadium, hockey fields and an 'aquatic centre' (for swimming, diving, synchronised swimming and water polo).

The Tuanaimato area was also the venue for much of the 2007 South Pacific Games.

== List of sports facilities ==
- Archery field
- Baseball field
- Beach volleyball courts
- Cricket oval
- Gymnasium
- Hockey fields
- Lawn bowls Centre
- Samoa Aquatic Centre
- Softball Field
- General sports Centre
- Squash Courts
- Toleafoa S.Blatter Soccer Stadium
- Tuanaimato Sports Complex
