= Weightlifting at the 2018 Commonwealth Games – Qualification =

== Qualification system ==
For the first time, weightlifting athletes had to qualify for the Games. A total of 226 weightlifters (120 male and 106 women) will qualify to compete at the games. Per the regulations each country may only enter one athlete per event for a total of 16 athletes (eight per gender). The host nation (Australia) is permitted to enter one athlete per event. The 2017 Commonwealth champion will also qualify. The next 12 spots (5 for the heaviest two women's categories) are awarded using the Commonwealth Rankings (from 24 October 2016 – 31 October 2017). Finally one spot is reserved for a wildcard per category.

== Summary ==
CGA	Men								Women								Total
CGA	56 kg	62 kg	69 kg	77 kg	85 kg	94 kg	105 kg	+105 kg	48 kg	53 kg	58 kg	63 kg	69 kg	75 kg	90 kg	+90 kg	Total
Australia	X	X	X	X	X	X	X	X	X	X	X	X	X	X	X	X	16
Bangladesh			X							X	X	X		X			5
Barbados				X			X										2
Botswana	X																1
Cameroon		X			X	X							X		X		6
Canada				X	X	X	X	X	X	X	X	X	X	X			11
Cook Islands														X		X	2
England				X	X	X	X	X	X	X	X	X	X	X		X	12
Fiji	X	X			X				X		X		X	X	X		8
Ghana					X	X	X			X							4
India	X	X	X	X	X	X	X	X	X	X	X	X	X	X	X	X	16
Kenya	X			X		X					X	X					5
Kiribati		X	X	X			X						X				5
Lesotho			X														1
Malta												X					1
Malaysia	X	X	X	X	X			X		X	X			X	X		10
Mauritius	X	X	X	X				X	X		X		X	X		X	10
Nauru	X	X	X	X	X			X		X		X	X			X	10
New Zealand		X	X	X	X		X	X		X	X		X	X	X	X	12
Nigeria		X			X				X	X							4
Northern Ireland				X		X		X				X	X				5
Pakistan	X	X	X			X		X									5
Papua New Guinea		X		X		X			X	X					X		6
Saint Vincent and the Grenadines														X			1
Samoa			X		X	X	X	X								X	6
Scotland						X	X		X		X						4
Seychelles		X					X					X					3
Singapore					X												1
Solomon Islands					X					X	X						3
South Africa											X	X	X				3
Sri Lanka	X	X	X	X		X	X	X	X	X	X			X			11
Tonga							X										1
Tuvalu		X															1
Uganda	X		X			X						X					4
Wales	X		X		X	X	X	X	X	X	X	X	X	X	X		13
Total: 35 CGAs	12	15	14	14	15	15	14	13	11	14	15	13	13	13	8	8	206

== Men ==
=== 56 kg ===
Method of qualification	Vacancies	Qualified
Host	1	Phillip Liao (AUS)
2017 Commonwealth Weightlifting Championships	1	Azroy Hazalwafie (MAS)
Commonwealth Rankings	10	Gururaja Poojary (IND); Chaturanga Lakmal (SRI); Manueli Tulo (FIJ); Elson Brechtefeld (NRU); Abdullah Ghafoor (PAK); ~~Luca Michael (ENG)~~; Jack Madanamoothoo (MRI); Seth Casidsid (WAL); ~~Colin Selfridge (SCO)~~; Julius Ssekitoleko (UGA); Kgaswane Kgotla (BOT); Benjamin Ochoma (KEN)
Invitation	0	TBD
TOTAL	12	

=== 62 kg ===
Method of qualification	Vacancies	Qualified
Host	1	Vannara Be (AUS)
2017 Commonwealth Weightlifting Championships	1	Morea Baru (PNG)
Commonwealth Rankings	12	~~Dimitris Minisadis (CYP)~~; Muhammad Aznil Bidin (MAS); Talha Talib (PAK); Thilanka Palangasinghe (SRI); Muthupandi Raja (IND); Ianne Guiñares (NZL); Olivier Matam (CMR); ~~Matt Darsigny (CAN)~~; Poama Qaqa (FIJ); Marc Jonathan Coret (MRI); Rick Confiance (SEY); ~~Haroon Saraj (ENG)~~; Ezekiel Moses (NRU); Favour Agboro (NGR); Manulla Raobu (TUV)
Invitation	1	Takirua Betero (KIR)
TOTAL	15	

=== 69 kg ===
Method of qualification	Vacancies	Qualified
Host	1	Brandon Wakeling (AUS)
2017 Commonwealth Weightlifting Championships	1	Mohd Hafifi Mansor (MAS)
Commonwealth Rankings	11	Vaipava Ioane (SAM); Deepak Lather (IND); Abu Sufyan (PAK); Gareth Evans (WAL); Indika Dissanayake (SRI); Vester Villalon (NZL); Ruben Katoatau (KIR); ~~Edouard Freve-Guerin (CAN)~~; ~~Otsile Shushu (RSA)~~; ~~Christopher Freebury (ENG)~~; Himul Singha (BAN); ~~Craig Carfray (SCO)~~; Dinesh Pandoo (MRI); Larko Doguape (NRU); Hakim Ssempereza (UGA)
Invitation	1	Bafokeng Moeti (LES)
TOTAL	14	

=== 77 kg ===
Method of qualification	Vacancies	Qualified
Host	1	François Etoundi (AUS)
2017 Commonwealth Weightlifting Championships	1	Sathish Sivalingam (IND)
Commonwealth Rankings	11	Abdul Rahim Mubin (MAS); Taretiita Tabaroua (KIR); Chinthana Vidanage (SRI); Nicolas Vachon (CAN); Toua Udia (PNG); Cameron McTaggart (NZL); Jack Oliver (ENG); ~~Haider Ali (PAK)~~; Romario Forde (BAR); ~~Jason Epton (SCO)~~; Webstar Lukose (KEN); Ika Aliklik (NRU); Jack Madanamoothoo (MRI)
Invitation	1	Karl McClean (NIR)
TOTAL	14	

=== 85 kg ===
Method of qualification	Vacancies	Qualified
Host	1	Boris Elesin (AUS)
2017 Commonwealth Weightlifting Championships	1	Ragala Venkat Rahul (IND)
Commonwealth Rankings	12	Don Opeloge (SAM); Mohamad Fazrul Azrie (MAS); Donald Keyimeh Nkoh (CMR); Richard Patterson (NZL); Mathieu Marineau (CAN); Michael Anyalewechi (NGR); Alex Collier (ENG); Taniela Rainibogi (FIJ); Christian Amoah (GHA); Tom-Jaye Weibeiya (NRU); Harry Misangyi (WAL); ~~Abdur Rehman (PAK)~~; En Wei John Cheah (SGP)
Invitation	1	David Gorosi (SOL)
TOTAL	15	

=== 94 kg ===
Method of qualification	Vacancies	Qualified
Host	1	Simplice Ribouem (AUS)
2017 Commonwealth Weightlifting Championships	1	Steven Kari (PNG)
Commonwealth Rankings	12	Boady Santavy (CAN); Usman Amjad Rathore (PAK); Siaosi Leuo (SAM); Vikas Thakur (IND); Edmon Avetisyan (ENG); Forrester Osei (GHA); Scott Wilson (SCO); Petit Minkoumba (CMR); ~~Douglas Sekone-Fraser (NZL)~~; ~~Alexandros Amanatidis (CYP)~~; Shanaka Peters (SRI); Stephen Forbes (NIR); Joshua Parry (WAL); Kalidi Batuusa (UGA)
Invitation	1	James Omondi (KEN)
TOTAL	15	

=== 105 kg ===
Method of qualification	Vacancies	Qualified
Host	1	Ridge Barredo (AUS)
2017 Commonwealth Weightlifting Championships	1	Pardeep Singh (IND)
Commonwealth Rankings	11	Owen Boxall (ENG); Sanele Mao (SAM); David Katoatau (KIR); Richmond Osarfo (GHA); Ryan Meidl (CAN); Stanislav Chalaev (NZL); ~~Elisha Tan Kim Ho (MAS)~~; ~~Jamil Akhter (PAK)~~; Ivorn McKnee (BAR); Jordan Sakkas (WAL); Zachary Courtney (SCO); ~~Kieran Mifsud (MLT)~~; A. Abeywickrama (SRI); Sateki Langi (TGA)
Invitation	1	Dereck Come (SEY)
TOTAL	14	

=== +105 kg ===
Method of qualification	Vacancies	Qualified
Host	1	Damon Kelly (AUS)
2017 Commonwealth Weightlifting Championships	1	Lauititi Lui (SAM)
Commonwealth Rankings	11	Muhammad Butt (PAK); David Liti (NZL); Gurdeep Singh (IND); Ben Watson (ENG); Miklos Bencsik (CAN); Itte Detenamo (NRU); Mohamad Ideris (MAS); Ushan Widana (SRI); ~~Stuart Cadger (SCO)~~; Rhodri West (WAL); ~~Curt Pretorius (RSA)~~; Cameron Montgomery (NIR); Alvin Jooron (MRI)
Invitation	0	
TOTAL	13	

== Women ==
=== 48 kg ===
Method of qualification	Vacancies	Qualified
Host	1	Alyce Stephenson (AUS)
2017 Commonwealth Weightlifting Championships	1	Saikhom Mirabai Chanu (IND)
Commonwealth Rankings	~~12~~ 9*	Marie Ranaivosoa (MRI); Amanda Braddock (CAN); Thelma Toua (PNG); Hannah Powell (WAL); Dinusha Gomas (SRI); Monica Uweh (NGR); Kelly Jo-Robson (ENG); ~~Charlotte Moss (NZL)~~; Lisa Tobias (SCO); ~~Triona Quigley (NIR)~~; Seruwaia Malani (FIJ)
Invitation	0	
TOTAL	11	

- Only 11 athletes were eligible through the rankings. It is unknown if the last spot will be reallocated to the invitations.
- New Zealand rejected its quota.

=== 53 kg ===
Method of qualification	Vacancies	Qualified
Host	1	Tegan Napper (AUS)
2017 Commonwealth Weightlifting Championships	1	Khumukcham Sanjita Chanu (IND)
Commonwealth Rankings	12	Dika Toua (PNG); Rachel Leblanc-Bazinet (CAN); Mary Kini Lifu (SOL); Phillipa Patterson (NZL); Sharifah Sydanuar (MAS); Fraer Morrow (ENG); Chamari Warnakulasuriya (SRI); Catrin Haf Jones (WAL); Ruth Baffoe (GHA); Fatima Yakubu (NGR); Fullapati Chakma (BAN); ~~Hazel Gray (SCO)~~; Liebon Akua (NRU)
Invitation	0	
TOTAL	14	

=== 58 kg ===
Method of qualification	Vacancies	Qualified
Host	1	Tia-Clair Toomey (AUS)
2017 Commonwealth Weightlifting Championships	1	Jenly Tegu Wini (SOL)
Commonwealth Rankings	12	Tali Darsigny (CAN); Saraswati Rout (IND); Alethea Boon (NZL); Johanni Taljaard (RSA); Laura Hewitt (ENG); Christie Williams (WAL); Ketty Lent (MRI); Jodey Hughes (SCO); Nadeeshani Rajapaksha (SRI); Marlyne Marceeta (MAS); Fayema Akther (BAN); Maria Mareta (FIJ)
Invitation	1	Winny Langat (KEN)
TOTAL	15	

=== 63 kg ===
Method of qualification	Vacancies	Qualified
Host	1	Seen Lee (AUS)
2017 Commonwealth Weightlifting Championships	1	Clementina Agricole (SEY)
Commonwealth Rankings	11	Maude Charron (CAN); Zoe Smith (ENG); Vandna Gupta (IND); Mona Pretorius (RSA); ~~Megan Signal (NZL)~~; ~~Frenceay Titus (MAS)~~; Mabia Aktar (BAN); Emma McQuiad (NIR); Yasmin Zammit-Stevens (MLT); ~~Bryony Watson (SCO)~~; ~~Alexandra Klatsia (CYP)~~; Maximina Uepa (NRU); Holly Knowles (WAL); Winnie Okoth (KEN); Irene Kasuubo (UGA)
Invitation	0	
TOTAL	13	

=== 69 kg ===
Method of qualification	Vacancies	Qualified
Host	1	Philippa Malone (AUS)
2017 Commonwealth Weightlifting Championships	1	Apolonia Vaivai (FIJ)
Commonwealth Rankings	11	Punam Yadav (IND); Andreanne Messier (CAN); Andrea Miller (NZL); Emanuella Labonne (MRI); Celestie Engelbrecht (RSA); Faye Pittman (WAL); Arcangeline Sonkbou (CMR); Sarah Davies (ENG); ~~Zoe Horseman (SCO)~~; ~~TBD (SRI)~~; Tiiao Bakaekiri (KIR); Rebekah Thompson (NIR); Ricci Daniel (NRU)
Invitation	0	
TOTAL	13	

=== 75 kg ===
Method of qualification	Vacancies	Qualified
Host	1	Stephanie Davies (AUS)
2017 Commonwealth Weightlifting Championships	1	Laura Hughes (WAL)
Commonwealth Rankings	10	Marie-Eve Beauchemin-Nadeau (CAN); Emily Godley (ENG); Seema (IND); Bailey Rogers (NZL); Rayen Cupid (VIN); Charhurika Balage (SRI); Jabriella Teo Samuel (MAS); ~~Georgina Black (SCO)~~; Philippa Woonton (COK); ~~TBD (CMR)~~; Alison Sunee (MRI); Juhora Nisha (BAN)
Invitation	0	
TOTAL	12	

=== 90 kg ===
Method of qualification	Vacancies	Qualified
Host	1	Kaity Fassina (AUS)
2017 Commonwealth Weightlifting Championships	1	Eileen Cikamatana (FIJ)
Commonwealth Rankings	5	Clementine Noumbissi (CMR); Tracey Lambrechs (NZL); Siti Rosli (MAS); Tayla Howe (WAL); Lorraine Harry (PNG)
Invitation	1	Lalchhanhimi (IND)
TOTAL	8	

=== +90 kg ===
Method of qualification	Vacancies	Qualified
Host	1	Deborah Acason (AUS)
2017 Commonwealth Weightlifting Championships	1	Laurel Hubbard (NZL)
Commonwealth Rankings	5	Feiagaiga Stowers (SAM); Emily Campbell (ENG); Luisa Peters (COK); Purnima Pandey (IND); Charisma Amoe-Tarrant (NRU)
Invitation	1	Shalinee Valaydon (MRI)
TOTAL	8	
