= List of New Zealand records in Olympic weightlifting =

The following are the national records in Olympic weightlifting in New Zealand. Records are maintained in each weight class for the snatch lift, Clean & Jerk lift, and the total for both lifts by Olympic Weightlifting New Zealand (OWNZ).

== Current records ==
=== Men ===
Event	Record	Athlete	Date	Meet	Place	Ref
60 kg
Snatch	106 kg	Standard				
Clean & Jerk	130 kg	Standard				
Total	237 kg	Standard				
65 kg
Snatch	113 kg	Standard				
Clean & Jerk	138 kg	Standard				
Total	250 kg	Standard				
70 kg
Snatch	118 kg	Standard				
Clean & Jerk	145 kg	Standard				
Total	263 kg	Standard				
75 kg
Snatch	124 kg	Standard				
Clean & Jerk	151 kg	Standard				
Total	274 kg	Standard				
85 kg
Snatch	132 kg	Standard				
Snatch	145 kg	Cameron McTaggart	2 November 2026	World Championships	Ningbo, China	
Clean & Jerk	162 kg	Standard				
Clean & Jerk	175 kg	Cameron McTaggart	2 November 2026	World Championships	Ningbo, China	
Total	294 kg	Standard				
Total	320 kg	Cameron McTaggart	2 November 2026	World Championships	Ningbo, China	
95 kg
Snatch	145 kg	Cameron McTaggart	18 September 2026	Oceania Cup	Hawthorn, Australia	
Clean & Jerk	175 kg	Cameron McTaggart	18 September 2026	Oceania Cup	Hawthorn, Australia	
Total	320 kg	Cameron McTaggart	18 September 2026	Oceania Cup	Hawthorn, Australia	
110 kg
Snatch	154 kg	Standard				
Clean & Jerk	185 kg	Standard				
Total	335 kg	Standard				
+110 kg
Snatch	177 kg	Standard				
Clean & Jerk	220 kg	Standard				
Total	397 kg	Standard				

=== Women ===
Event	Record	Athlete	Date	Meet	Place	Ref
49 kg
Snatch	66 kg	Standard				
Clean & Jerk	81 kg	Standard				
Total	147 kg	Standard				
53 kg
Snatch	70 kg	Standard				
Clean & Jerk	86 kg	Standard				
Total	156 kg	Standard				
57 kg
Snatch	74 kg	Standard				
Clean & Jerk	90 kg	Standard				
Total	164 kg	Standard				
63 kg
Snatch	77 kg	Standard				
Clean & Jerk	94 kg	Standard				
Total	172 kg	Standard				
69 kg
Snatch	103 kg	Standard				
Clean & Jerk	126 kg	Standard				
Total	226 kg	Standard				
77 kg
Snatch	106 kg	Standard				
Clean & Jerk	130 kg	Standard				
Total	235 kg	Standard				
86 kg
Snatch	111 kg	Standard				
Clean & Jerk	131 kg	Standard				
Total	240 kg	Standard				
+86 kg
Snatch	113 kg	Standard				
Clean & Jerk	142 kg	Standard				
Total	244 kg	Standard				

== Historical records ==
=== Men (2025–2026) ===
Event	Record	Athlete	Date	Meet	Place	Ref
60 kg
Snatch	106 kg	Standard				
Clean & Jerk	130 kg	Standard				
Total	237 kg	Standard				
65 kg
Snatch	113 kg	Standard				
Clean & Jerk	138 kg	Standard				
Total	250 kg	Standard				
71 kg
Snatch	120 kg	Vernon Taylor	3 July 2025	Pacific Mini Games	Meyuns, Palau	
Clean & Jerk	146 kg	Standard				
Total	265 kg	Standard				
79 kg
Snatch	135 kg	Marco Mollo	28 August 2025	Commonwealth Championships	Ahmedabad, India	
Clean & Jerk	169 kg	Marco Mollo	29 April 2026	Oceania Championships	Apia, Samoa	
Total	302 kg	Marco Mollo	28 August 2025	Commonwealth Championships	Ahmedabad, India	
88 kg
Snatch	154 kg	Cameron McTaggart	29 April 2026	Oceania Championships	Apia, Samoa	
Clean & Jerk	185 kg	Cameron McTaggart	29 April 2026	Oceania Championships	Apia, Samoa	
Total	339 kg	Cameron McTaggart	29 April 2026	Oceania Championships	Apia, Samoa	
94 kg
Snatch	151 kg	Cameron McTaggart	7 March 2026	Auckland Championships	Auckland, New Zealand	
Clean & Jerk	180 kg	Cameron McTaggart	7 March 2026	Auckland Championships	Auckland, New Zealand	
Total	331 kg	Cameron McTaggart	7 March 2026	Auckland Championships	Auckland, New Zealand	
110 kg
Snatch	154 kg	Xavier Tiffany	30 August 2025	Commonwealth Championships	Ahmedabad, India	
Clean & Jerk	185 kg	Malachi Faamausili-Fala	1 May 2026	Oceania Championships	Apia, Samoa	
Total	335 kg	Xavier Tiffany	13 June 2025	North Island Championships	Tawa, New Zealand	
+110 kg
Snatch	177 kg	David Liti	30 August 2025	Commonwealth Championships	Ahmedabad, India	
Clean & Jerk	223 kg	David Liti	30 July 2026	Commonwealth Games	Glasgow, United Kingdom	
Total	397 kg	David Liti	30 August 2025	Commonwealth Championships	Ahmedabad, India	

=== Men (2018–2025) ===
Event	Record	Athlete	Date	Meet	Place	Ref
55 kg
Snatch	97 kg	Standard				
Clean & Jerk	118 kg	Standard				
Total	215 kg	Standard				
61 kg
Snatch	112 kg	Standard				
Clean & Jerk	136 kg	Standard				
Total	248 kg	Standard				
67 kg
Snatch	119 kg	Standard				
Clean & Jerk	146 kg	Standard				
Total	265 kg	Standard				
73 kg
Snatch	128 kg	Vester Villalon	26 February 2022	New Zealand International	Auckland, New Zealand	
Clean & Jerk	160 kg	Vester Villalon	11 December 2021	Upper North Island Championships	Auckland, New Zealand	
Total	287 kg	Vester Villalon	26 February 2022	New Zealand International	Auckland, New Zealand	
81 kg
Snatch	141 kg	Cameron McTaggart	2 November 2019	New Zealand Championships	Auckland, New Zealand	
Clean & Jerk	175 kg	Cameron McTaggart	31 July 2021	Olympic Games	Tokyo, Japan	
Total	315 kg	Cameron McTaggart	31 July 2021	Olympic Games	Tokyo, Japan	
89 kg
Snatch	148 kg	Cameron McTaggart	27 October 2024	New Zealand Championships	Auckland, New Zealand	
Clean & Jerk	179 kg	Cameron McTaggart	27 October 2024	New Zealand Championships	Auckland, New Zealand	
Total	327 kg	Cameron McTaggart	27 October 2024	New Zealand Championships	Auckland, New Zealand	
96 kg
Snatch	147 kg	Xavier Albert	17 September 2024	Commonwealth Championships	Suva, Fiji	
Clean & Jerk	176 kg	Standard				
Total	321 kg	Standard				
102 kg
Snatch	149 kg	Standard				
Clean & Jerk	181 kg	Standard				
Total	330 kg	Standard				
109 kg
Snatch	155 kg	Thomas Wilbur	27 October 2024	New Zealand Championships	Auckland, New Zealand	
Clean & Jerk	192 kg	Koale Junior Tasi Taala	27 February 2022	New Zealand International	Auckland, New Zealand	
Total	339 kg	Andy Barakauskas	8 December 2018	CCW Open	Christchurch, New Zealand	
+109 kg
Snatch	184 kg	David Liti	15 June 2024	North Island Championships	Papatoetoe, New Zealand	
Clean & Jerk	236 kg	David Liti	4 August 2021	Olympic Games	Tokyo, Japan	
Total	414 kg	David Liti	15 November 2020	New Zealand Championships	Tauranga, New Zealand	
Total	415 kg	David Liti	10 August 2024	Olympic Games	Paris, France	

=== Men (1998–2018) ===
Event	Record	Athlete	Date	Meet	Place	Ref
–56 kg
Snatch	95 kg	Lou Guinares	18 May 2013	Auckland Championships	Auckland, New Zealand	
Clean & Jerk	124 kg	Lou Guinares	4 October 2010	Commonwealth Games	Delhi, India	
Total	218 kg	Lou Guinares	4 October 2010	Commonwealth Games	Delhi, India	
–62 kg
Snatch	117 kg	Ianne Guiñares	3 April 2015	Auckland Championships	Auckland, New Zealand	
Clean & Jerk	146 kg	Ianne Guiñares	3 April 2015	Auckland Championships	Auckland, New Zealand	
Total	263 kg	Ianne Guiñares	3 April 2015	Auckland Championships	Auckland, New Zealand	
–69 kg
Snatch	131 kg	Mark Spooner	11 March 2008	Oceania Championships	Auckland, New Zealand	
Clean & Jerk	164 kg	Mark Spooner	14 May 2009	Arafura Games	Darwin, Australia	
Total	294 kg	Mark Spooner	14 May 2009	Arafura Games	Darwin, Australia	
–77 kg
Snatch	140 kg	Richie Patterson	12 April 2008	Auckland Championships	Auckland, New Zealand	
Clean & Jerk	176 kg	Richie Patterson	12 April 2008	Auckland Championships	Auckland, New Zealand	
Total	316 kg	Richie Patterson	12 April 2008	Auckland Championships	Auckland, New Zealand	
–85 kg
Snatch	156 kg	Richie Patterson	30 May 2014	Oceania Championships	Mont Dore, New Caledonia	
Clean & Jerk	192 kg	Richie Patterson	29 November 2013	Commonwealth Championships	Penang, Malaysia	
Total	345 kg	Richie Patterson	28 April 2012	Club Contest	Auckland, New Zealand	
–94 kg
Snatch	155 kg	Grant Cavit				
Clean & Jerk	193 kg	Richie Patterson	17 April 2010	Club Contest	Auckland, New Zealand	
Total	343 kg	Richie Patterson	17 April 2010	Club Contest	Auckland, New Zealand	
–105 kg
Snatch	156 kg	Andrew Ciancio	6 October 2012	New Zealand Championships	Auckland, New Zealand	
Clean & Jerk	190 kg	Grant Cavit	12 February 2005		Auckland, New Zealand	
Total	341 kg	Andrew Ciancio	6 October 2012	New Zealand Championships	Auckland, New Zealand	
+105 kg
Snatch	176 kg	David Liti	23 September 2018	New Zealand Championships	Auckland, New Zealand	
Clean & Jerk	229 kg	David Liti	9 April 2018	Commonwealth Games	Gold Coast, Australia	
Total	403 kg	David Liti	9 April 2018	Commonwealth Games	Gold Coast, Australia	

=== Women (2025–2026) ===
Event	Record	Athlete	Date	Meet	Place	Ref
48 kg
Snatch	65 kg	Standard				
Clean & Jerk	80 kg	Standard				
Total	145 kg	Standard				
53 kg
Snatch	70 kg	Standard				
Clean & Jerk	86 kg	Standard				
Total	156 kg	Standard				
58 kg
Snatch	76 kg	Hannah Close	8 February 2025	Wellington Championships	Tawa, New Zealand	
Clean & Jerk	97 kg	Elizabeth Granger	26 August 2025	Commonwealth Championships	Ahmedabad, India	
Total	172 kg	Elizabeth Granger	26 August 2025	Commonwealth Championships	Ahmedabad, India	
63 kg
Snatch	93 kg	Sienna Fesolai	19 June 2026	North Island Championships	Papatoetoe, New Zealand	
Clean & Jerk	108 kg	Sienna Fesolai	7 March 2026	Auckland Championships	Auckland, New Zealand	
Total	197 kg	Sienna Fesolai	29 April 2026	Oceania Championships	Apia, Samoa	
69 kg
Snatch	103 kg	Olivia Selemaia	11 April 2025	Youth & Junior Oceania Championships	Melbourne, Australia	
Clean & Jerk	126 kg	Olivia Selemaia	19 June 2026	North Island Championships	Papatoetoe, New Zealand	
Total	226 kg	Olivia Selemaia	7 October 2025	World Championships	Førde, Norway	
77 kg
Snatch	106 kg	Olivia Selemaia	3 May 2025	World Junior Championships	Lima, Peru	
Clean & Jerk	130 kg	Olivia Selemaia	7 March 2026	Auckland Championships	Auckland, New Zealand	
Total	235 kg	Olivia Selemaia	3 May 2025	World Junior Championships	Lima, Peru	
86 kg
Snatch	111 kg	Litia Nacagilevu	30 April 2026	Oceania Championships	Apia, Samoa	
Clean & Jerk	131 kg	Litia Nacagilevu	9 October 2025	World Championships	Førde, Norway	
Total	240 kg	Litia Nacagilevu	9 October 2025	World Championships	Førde, Norway	
+86 kg
Snatch	115 kg	Tui-Alofa Patolo	30 July 2026	Commonwealth Games	Glasgow, United Kingdom	
Clean & Jerk	142 kg	Judy Soloai	27 June 2026	South Island Championships	Nelson, New Zealand	
Total	245 kg	Tui-Alofa Patolo	30 July 2026	Commonwealth Games	Glasgow, United Kingdom	

=== Women (2018–2025) ===
Event	Record	Athlete	Date	Meet	Place	Ref
45 kg
Snatch	60 kg	Standard				
Clean & Jerk	74 kg	Standard				
Total	134 kg	Standard				
49 kg
Snatch	64 kg	Standard				
Clean & Jerk	78 kg	Standard				
Total	142 kg	Standard				
55 kg
Snatch	75 kg	Standard				
Clean & Jerk	91 kg	Standard				
Total	166 kg	Standard				
59 kg
Snatch	80 kg	Elizabeth Granger	4 June 2022	North Island Championships	Hastings, New Zealand	
Clean & Jerk	103 kg	Riana Froger	22 February 2024	Oceania Championships	Auckland, New Zealand	
Clean & Jerk	103 kg	Riana Froger	21 November 2023	Pacific Games	Honiara, Solomon Islands	
Total	180 kg	Riana Froger	22 February 2024	Oceania Championships	Auckland, New Zealand	
64 kg
Snatch	92 kg	Megan Signal	22 September 2019	World Championships	Pattaya, Thailand	
Clean & Jerk	115 kg	Megan Signal	22 September 2019	World Championships	Pattaya, Thailand	
Total	207 kg	Megan Signal	22 September 2019	World Championships	Pattaya, Thailand	
71 kg
Snatch	106 kg	Olivia Selemaia	3 May 2025	World Junior Championships	Lima, Peru	
Clean & Jerk	129 kg	Olivia Selemaia	3 May 2025	World Junior Championships	Lima, Peru	
Total	235 kg	Olivia Selemaia	3 May 2025	World Junior Championships	Lima, Peru	
76 kg
Snatch	98 kg	Kanah Andrews-Nahu	5 June 2019	Junior World Championships	Suva, Fiji	
Clean & Jerk	123 kg	Megan Signal	4 July 2021	North Island Championships	Feilding, New Zealand	
Total	218 kg	Megan Signal	4 July 2021	North Island Championships	Feilding, New Zealand	
81 kg
Snatch	101 kg	Hayley Whiting	25 March 2023	Auckland Championships	Auckland, New Zealand	
Clean & Jerk	121 kg	Hayley Whiting	25 March 2023	Auckland Championships	Auckland, New Zealand	
Total	222 kg	Hayley Whiting	25 March 2023	Auckland Championships	Auckland, New Zealand	
87 kg
Snatch	104 kg	Medea Jones	25 February 2024	Oceania Championships	Auckland, New Zealand	
Clean & Jerk	125 kg	Hayley Whiting	27 February 2022	New Zealand International	Auckland, New Zealand	
Total	224 kg	Medea Jones	15 June 2024	North Island Championships	Papatoetoe, New Zealand	
+87 kg
Snatch	133 kg	Laurel Hubbard	1 March 2020	Australian Open	Canberra, Australia	
Clean & Jerk	154 kg	Laurel Hubbard	27 September 2019	World Championships	Pattaya, Thailand	
Total	285 kg	Laurel Hubbard	27 September 2019	World Championships	Pattaya, Thailand	

=== Women (1998–2018) ===
Event	Record	Athlete	Date	Meet	Place	Ref
–48 kg
Snatch	64 kg	Charlotte Moss	17 March 2017	AWF International	Melbourne, Australia	
Clean & Jerk	76 kg	Charlotte Moss	17 March 2017	AWF International	Melbourne, Australia	
Total	140 kg	Charlotte Moss	17 March 2017	AWF International	Melbourne, Australia	
–53 kg
Snatch	79 kg	Phillipa Hale	25 July 2014	Commonwealth Games	Glasgow, Great Britain	
Clean & Jerk	96 kg	Phillipa Hale	11 July 2013	Oceania Championships	Brisbane, Australia	
Total	174 kg	Phillipa Hale	25 July 2014	Commonwealth Games	Glasgow, Great Britain	
–58 kg
Snatch	81 kg	Alethea Boon	10 June 2017	North Island Championships	Auckland, New Zealand	
Clean & Jerk	100 kg	Alethea Boon	6 April 2018	Commonwealth Games	Gold Coast, Australia	
Total	181 kg	Alethea Boon	6 April 2018	Commonwealth Games	Gold Coast, Australia	
–63 kg
Snatch	93 kg	Andrea Miller	26 May 2016	Oceania Championships	Suva, Fiji	
Clean & Jerk	110 kg	Andrea Miller	27 February 2016	Club Contest	Brisbane, Australia	
Total	199 kg	Andrea Miller	27 February 2016	Club Contest	Brisbane, Australia	
–69 kg
Snatch	95 kg	Andrea Hams	24 February 2018	Australian Open	Brisbane, Australia	
Clean & Jerk	112 kg	Andrea Miller	3 October 2015	New Zealand Championships	Wellington, New Zealand	
Total	206 kg	Andrea Hams	24 February 2018	Australian Open	Brisbane, Australia	
–75 kg
Snatch	94 kg	Andrea Miller	3 December 2016	Club Contest	Brisbane, Australia	
Clean & Jerk	116 kg	Bailey Rogers	8 April 2018	Commonwealth Games	Gold Coast, Australia	
Total	204 kg	Andrea Miller	3 December 2016	Club Contest	Brisbane, Australia	
–90 kg
Snatch	100 kg	Standard Record				
Clean & Jerk	124 kg	Tracey Lambrechs	9 September 2017	Commonwealth & Oceania Championships	Gold Coast, Australia	
Total	219 kg	Tracey Lambrechs	9 September 2017	Commonwealth & Oceania Championships	Gold Coast, Australia	
+90 kg
Snatch	131 kg OC	Laurel Hubbard	11 June 2017	North Island Championships	Auckland, New Zealand	
Clean & Jerk	151 kg	Laurel Hubbard	11 June 2017	North Island Championships	Auckland, New Zealand	
Total	282 kg	Laurel Hubbard	11 June 2017	North Island Championships	Auckland, New Zealand	
