= Weightlifting at the 2017 Pacific Mini Games =

Weightlifting at the 2017 Pacific Mini Games was held in Port Vila, Vanuatu at the Epauto Arena from 5–7 December.

== Medal table ==
Rank	Nation	Gold	Silver	Bronze	Total
1	Papua New Guinea	14	4	0	18
2	Samoa	13	9	7	29
3	Fiji	9	8	10	27
4	Kiribati	3	5	3	11
5	Solomon Islands	3	3	3	9
6	Marshall Islands	3	0	0	3
7	New Zealand	2	7	0	9
8	Wallis and Futuna	1	2	0	3
9	Nauru	0	7	14	21
10	Cook Islands	0	2	4	6
11	Guam	0	1	0	1
12	Australia	0	0	2	2
13	American Samoa	0	0	1	1
13	Northern Mariana Islands	0	0	1	1
Totals (14 entries)		48	48	45	141

== Event summary ==
Sixteen weightlifting categories were contested at the 2017 games.

=== Men's results ===
Event	Gold		Silver		Bronze		Ref
56 kg Snatch	(Fiji) Manueli Tulo	109 kg	(Nauru) Elson Brechtefeld	104 kg	(Solomon Islands) Walter Shradrack	80 kg	
56 kg Clean & Jerk	(Fiji) Manueli Tulo	129 kg	(Nauru) Elson Brechtefeld	128 kg	(Solomon Islands) Walter Shradrack	93 kg	
56 kg Total	(Fiji) Manueli Tulo	238 kg	(Nauru) Elson Brechtefeld	232 kg	(Solomon Islands) Walter Shradrack	173 kg	
62 kg Snatch	(Papua New Guinea) Morea Baru	129 kg	(Fiji) Poama Qaqa	110 kg	(Nauru) Ezekiel Moses	100 kg	
62 kg Clean & Jerk	(Papua New Guinea) Morea Baru	155 kg	(Fiji) Poama Qaqa	127 kg	(Nauru) Ezekiel Moses	126 kg	
62 kg Total	(Papua New Guinea) Morea Baru	284 kg	(Fiji) Poama Qaqa	237 kg	(Nauru) Ezekiel Moses	226 kg	
69 kg Snatch	(Samoa) Vaipava Ioane	130 kg	(Kiribati) Ruben Katoatau	118 kg	(Nauru) Uea Detudamo	105 kg	
69 kg Clean & Jerk	(Samoa) Vaipava Ioane	165 kg	(Kiribati) Ruben Katoatau	155 kg	(Nauru) Larko Doguape	135 kg	
69 kg Total	(Samoa) Vaipava Ioane	295 kg	(Kiribati) Ruben Katoatau	273 kg	(Nauru) Larko Doguape	238 kg	
77 kg Snatch	(Kiribati) Taretiita Tabaroua	128 kg	(Papua New Guinea) Toua Udia	127 kg	(Nauru) Ika Aliklik	117 kg	
77 kg Clean & Jerk	(Papua New Guinea) Toua Udia	172 kg	(Kiribati) Taretiita Tabaroua	170 kg	(Fiji) Tevita Tawai	165 kg	
77 kg Total	(Papua New Guinea) Toua Udia	299 kg	(Kiribati) Taretiita Tabaroua	298 kg	(Fiji) Tevita Tawai	275 kg	
85 kg Snatch	(Wallis and Futuna) Israel Kaikilekofe	148 kg	(Samoa) Don Opeloge	147 kg	(Fiji) Taniela Rainibogi	138 kg	
85 kg Clean & Jerk	(Samoa) Don Opeloge	180 kg	(Wallis and Futuna) Israel Kaikilekofe	173 kg	(Fiji) Taniela Rainibogi	165 kg	
85 kg Total	(Samoa) Don Opeloge	327 kg	(Wallis and Futuna) Israel Kaikilekofe	321 kg	(Fiji) Taniela Rainibogi	303 kg	
94 kg Snatch	(Papua New Guinea) Steven Kari	155 kg	(Samoa) Siaosi Leuo	152 kg	(Australia) John Downes	111 kg	
94 kg Clean & Jerk	(Papua New Guinea) Steven Kari	195 kg	(Samoa) Siaosi Leuo	186 kg	(Northern Mariana Islands) Angel San Nicolas	141 kg	
94 kg Total	(Papua New Guinea) Steven Kari	350 kg	(Samoa) Siaosi Leuo	338 kg	(Australia) John Downes	251 kg	
105 kg Snatch	(Samoa) Sanele Mao	150 kg	(Samoa) Koriata Petelo	150 kg	(American Samoa) Tanumafili Jungblut	135 kg	
105 kg Clean & Jerk	(Kiribati) David Katoatau	194 kg	(Samoa) Sanele Mao	186 kg	(Samoa) Koriata Petelo	186 kg	
105 kg Total	(Samoa) Sanele Mao	336 kg	(Samoa) Koriata Petelo	336 kg	(Kiribati) David Katoatau	329 kg	
+105 kg Snatch	(Samoa) Lauititi Lui	180 kg	(Nauru) Itte Detenamo	155 kg	(Samoa) Tovia Opeloge	151 kg	
+105 kg Clean & Jerk	(Samoa) Lauititi Lui	220 kg	(Nauru) Itte Detenamo	200 kg	(Samoa) Tovia Opeloge	191 kg	
+105 kg Total	(Samoa) Lauititi Lui	400 kg	(Nauru) Itte Detenamo	355 kg	(Samoa) Tovia Opeloge	342 kg	

=== Women's results ===
Event	Gold		Silver		Bronze		Ref
48 kg Snatch	(Papua New Guinea) Thelma Toua	65 kg	(Fiji) Seruwaia Malani	50 kg	Not awarded		
48 kg Clean & Jerk	(Papua New Guinea) Thelma Toua	85 kg	(Fiji) Seruwaia Malani	65 kg	Not awarded		
48 kg Total	(Papua New Guinea) Thelma Toua	150 kg	(Fiji) Seruwaia Malani	115 kg	Not awarded		
53 kg Snatch	(Papua New Guinea) Dika Toua	80 kg	(Solomon Islands) Mary Kini Lifu	65 kg	(Nauru) Liebon Akua	57 kg	
53 kg Clean & Jerk	(Papua New Guinea) Dika Toua	110 kg	(Solomon Islands) Mary Kini Lifu	85 kg	(Fiji) Arieta Mudunavoce	70 kg	
53 kg Total	(Papua New Guinea) Dika Toua	190 kg	(Solomon Islands) Mary Kini Lifu	150 kg	(Fiji) Arieta Mudunavoce	126 kg	
58 kg Snatch	(Solomon Islands) Jenly Tegu Wini	82 kg	(Guam) Jacinta Sumagaysay	71 kg	(Fiji) Sofia Kinikinilau	60 kg	
58 kg Clean & Jerk	(Solomon Islands) Jenly Tegu Wini	105 kg	(Samoa) Sekolasitika Isaia	83 kg	(Nauru) Bernada Uepa	82 kg	
58 kg Total	(Solomon Islands) Jenly Tegu Wini	187 kg	(Samoa) Sekolasitika Isaia	143 kg	(Fiji) Sofia Kinikinilau	141 kg	
63 kg Snatch	(Marshall Islands) Mathlynn Sasser	96 kg	(New Zealand) Amanda Gould	77 kg	(Nauru) Maximina Uepa	72 kg	
63 kg Clean & Jerk	(Marshall Islands) Mathlynn Sasser	123 kg	(New Zealand) Amanda Gould	96 kg	(Nauru) Maximina Uepa	95 kg	
63 kg Total	(Marshall Islands) Mathlynn Sasser	219 kg	(New Zealand) Amanda Gould	173 kg	(Nauru) Maximina Uepa	167 kg	
69 kg Snatch	(New Zealand) Samantha Hansen	73 kg	(Fiji) Maria Liku	70 kg	(Kiribati) Tiiau Bakaekiri	66 kg	
69 kg Clean & Jerk	(Kiribati) Tiiau Bakaekiri	92 kg	(New Zealand) Samantha Hansen	90 kg	(Fiji) Maria Liku	88 kg	
69 kg Total	(New Zealand) Samantha Hansen	163 kg	(Fiji) Maria Liku	158 kg	(Kiribati) Tiiau Bakaekiri	158 kg	
75 kg Snatch	(Fiji) Apolonia Vaivai	95 kg	(New Zealand) Hayley Whiting	78 kg	(Cook Islands) Philippa Woonton	71 kg	
75 kg Clean & Jerk	(Fiji) Apolonia Vaivai	120 kg	(New Zealand) Hayley Whiting	98 kg	(Cook Islands) Philippa Woonton	91 kg	
75 kg Total	(Fiji) Apolonia Vaivai	215 kg	(New Zealand) Hayley Whiting	176 kg	(Cook Islands) Philippa Woonton	162 kg	
90 kg Snatch	(Fiji) Eileen Cikamatana	105 kg	(Papua New Guinea) Lorraine Harry	84 kg	(Samoa) Lesila Fiapule	76 kg	
90 kg Clean & Jerk	(Fiji) Eileen Cikamatana	143 kg	(Papua New Guinea) Lorraine Harry	107 kg	(Samoa) Lesila Fiapule	97 kg	
90 kg Total	(Fiji) Eileen Cikamatana	248 kg	(Papua New Guinea) Lorraine Harry	191 kg	(Samoa) Lesila Fiapule	173 kg	
+90 kg Snatch	(Samoa) Feagaiga Stowers	108 kg	(Cook Islands) Luisa Peters	101 kg	(Nauru) Charisma Amoe-Tarrant	93 kg	
+90 kg Clean & Jerk	(Samoa) Feagaiga Stowers	131 kg	(Nauru) Charisma Amoe-Tarrant	122 kg	(Cook Islands) Luisa Peters	115 kg	
+90 kg Total	(Samoa) Feagaiga Stowers	239 kg	(Cook Islands) Luisa Peters	216 kg	(Nauru) Charisma Amoe-Tarrant	215 kg	

== See also ==
- Weightlifting at the Pacific Games
