= Weightlifting at the 2013 Pacific Mini Games =

Weightlifting, for the 2013 Pacific Mini Games, was held at Kafika Hall. Competition started on 3 September and was finished on 5 September 2013.

== Medal table ==
Key:

* Host nation (Wallis and Futuna)

Rank	Nation	Gold	Silver	Bronze	Total
1	Papua New Guinea (PNG)	5	1	3	9
2	Samoa (SAM)	3	1	3	7
3	Kiribati (KIR)	2	1	1	4
4	Solomon Islands (SOL)	1	2	0	3
5	Fiji (FIJ)	1	1	0	2
6	Nauru (NRU)	1	0	1	2
7	Federated States of Micronesia (FSM)	1	0	0	1
8	French Polynesia (TAH)	0	1	1	2
8	Tuvalu (TUV)	0	1	1	2
10	Cook Islands (COK)	0	1	0	1
10	Marshall Islands (MHL)	0	1	0	1
10	New Caledonia (NCL)	0	1	0	1
10	Niue (NIU)	0	1	0	1
10	Palau (PLW)	0	1	0	1
15	Tonga (TON)	0	0	2	2
16	Wallis and Futuna (WLF)*	0	0	1	1
Totals (16 entries)		14	13	13	40

== Medal summary ==
There were eight men's weight classes and six women's weight classes.

=== Men's events ===
Event	Gold	Silver	Bronze
56 kg	Morea Baru; Papua New Guinea	Fred Oala; Papua New Guinea	Kalmonio Taaloo; Wallis and Futuna
62 kg	Manuel Minginfel; Federated States of Micronesia	Tuau Lapua Lapua; Tuvalu	Vaipava-Nevo Ioane; Samoa
69 kg	Taknibeia Toromon; Kiribati	Stevick Patris; Palau	Elson Brechtefeld; Nauru
77 kg	Toua Udia; Papua New Guinea	Otang Karitema; Kiribati	Logona Esau; Tuvalu
85 kg	Yukio Peter; Nauru	David Gorosi; Solomon Islands	Taubena Tatonga; Kiribati
94 kg	Steven Kari; Papua New Guinea	Petunu Opeloge; Samoa	Feofoofani Takau; Tonga
105 kg	David Katoatau; Kiribati	Petelo Lagikula; New Caledonia	Junior Tasi; Samoa
+105 kg	Tovia Opeloge; Samoa	Daniel Nemani; Niue	Lui Lauititi; Samoa

=== Women's events ===
Event	Gold	Silver	Bronze
48 kg	Saruwaia Malani; Fiji	Claudine Yu Hing; Tahiti	Gillian Ovia; Papua New Guinea
58 kg	Jenly Tegu Wini; Solomon Islands	Mathlynn Robert-Sasser; Marshall Islands	Monalisa Kassman; Papua New Guinea
63 kg	Rita Kari; Papua New Guinea	Heplin Iro; Solomon Islands	Coralie Sienne; Tahiti
69 kg	Guba Hale Mea; Papua New Guinea	Not awarded	Not awarded
75 kg	Mary Opeloge; Samoa	Apolonia Vaivai; Fiji	Lorraine Harry; Papua New Guinea
+75 kg	Iuniarra Sipaia; Samoa	Luisa Peters; Cook Islands	Suliana Fate; Tonga

== See also ==
- Weightlifting at the Pacific Games
