= Weightlifting at the 2018 Commonwealth Games – Men's 62 kg =

Weightlifting – Men's 62 kg at the 2018 Commonwealth Games
- Venue: Carrara Sports and Leisure Centre
- Dates: 5 April 2018
- Competitors: 15 from 15 nations
- Winning total weight: 288

Medalists
gold medal	Muhamad Aznil Bidin	Malaysia
silver medal	Morea Baru	Papua New Guinea
bronze medal	Talha Talib	Pakistan

The Men's 62 kg weightlifting event at the 2018 Commonwealth Games took place at the Carrara Sports and Leisure Centre on 5 April 2018. The weightlifter from Malaysia won the gold, with a combined lift of 288 kg. Papua New Guinea and Pakistan claimed the silver and bronze medals, respectively. Pakistan's Talha Talib established a new games record during the competition in the snatch event:

== Records ==
Prior to this competition, the existing world, Commonwealth and Games records were as follows:

World record	Snatch	Kim Un-guk (PRK)	154 kg	Incheon, South Korea	21 September 2014
World record	Clean & Jerk	Chen Lijun (CHN)	183 kg	Houston, United States	22 November 2015
World record	Total	Chen Lijun (CHN)	333 kg	Houston, United States	22 November 2015
Commonwealth record	Snatch	Dimitrios Minasides (CYP)	133 kg	Pescara, Italy	26 June 2009
Commonwealth record	Clean & Jerk	Marcus Stephen (NRU)	172 kg	Athens, Greece	23 November 1999
Commonwealth record	Total	Marcus Stephen (NRU)	300 kg	Athens, Greece	23 November 1999
Games record	Snatch	Yurik Sarkisian (AUS)	125 kg	Kuala Lumpur, Malaysia	16 September 1998
Games record	Clean & Jerk	Marcus Stephen (NRU)	167 kg	Kuala Lumpur, Malaysia	16 September 1998
Games record	Total	Marcus Stephen (NRU)	292 kg	Kuala Lumpur, Malaysia	16 September 1998

The following records were established during the competition:

Snatch	132 kg	Talha Talib (PAK)	GR

== Schedule ==
All times are Australian Eastern Standard Time (UTC+10)

Date	Time	Round
Thursday 5 April 2018	18:42	Final

== Results ==
Rank	Athlete	Body weight (kg)	Snatch (kg)				Clean & Jerk (kg)				Total
Rank	Athlete	Body weight (kg)	1	2	3	Result	1	2	3	Result	Total
1st place, gold medalist(s)	Muhamad Aznil Bidin (MAS)	61.71	123	126	~~128~~	126	158	162	~~166~~	162	288
2nd place, silver medalist(s)	Morea Baru (PNG)	61.86	123	127	~~130~~	127	~~159~~	159	~~163~~	159	286
3rd place, bronze medalist(s)	Talha Talib (PAK)	61.94	127	130	132	132 GR	146	151	~~154~~	151	283
4	Thilanka Palangasinghe (SRI)	61.92	120	124	~~126~~	124	155	~~160~~	~~160~~	155	279
5	Favour Agboro (NGR)	61.69	106	110	112	112	147	151	156	156	267
6	Raja Muthupandi (IND)	61.96	113	~~116~~	116	116	143	~~148~~	150	150	266
7	Ianne Guiñares (NZL)	61.89	110	114	116	116	140	~~144~~	145	145	261
8	Olivier Heracles Matam Matam (CMR)	61.91	113	~~116~~	~~116~~	113	~~145~~	145	~~150~~	145	258
9	Poama Qaqa (FIJ)	61.94	~~113~~	113	~~118~~	113	142	~~149~~	~~149~~	142	255
10	Vannara Be (AUS)	61.92	102	106	110	110	120	126	132	132	242
11	Marc Jonathan Coret (MRI)	61.71	~~105~~	~~105~~	105	105	135	~~140~~	~~140~~	135	240
12	Ezekiel Moses (NRU)	61.75	~~100~~	~~100~~	100	100	125	130	134	134	234
13	Manuila Raobu (TUV)	61.44	95	~~100~~	~~100~~	95	~~117~~	117	121	121	216
14	Takirua Betero (KIR)	61.57	80	85	90	90	115	120	~~125~~	120	210
	Rick Yves Confiance (SEY)	61.74	101	~~107~~	~~110~~	101	~~125~~	~~125~~	~~125~~	–	–
