= 2014 Oceania Weightlifting Championships =

International weightlifting competition

- Host city: Le Mont-Dore, New Caledonia
- Dates: 28–31 May 2014
- Main venue: Complexe Sportif de Boulari

The 2014 Oceania Weightlifting Championships took place at the Complexe Sportif de Boulari in Le Mont-Dore, New Caledonia from 28 to 31 May 2014.

== Medal summary ==
Results shown below are for the senior competition only. Junior and youth results are cited here and here respectively.

=== Medal table ===
* Host nation (New Caledonia)

Rank	Nation	Gold	Silver	Bronze	Total
1	Samoa	3	3	3	9
2	Papua New Guinea	3	2	1	6
3	New Zealand	2	4	4	10
4	Australia	2	3	3	8
5	Fiji	1	1	2	4
6	Kiribati	1	1	0	2
7	Marshall Islands	1	0	0	1
7	Nauru	1	0	0	1
7	Solomon Islands	1	0	0	1
10	Niue	0	1	0	1
11	Federated States of Micronesia	0	0	1	1
11	New Caledonia*	0	0	1	1
Totals (12 entries)		15	15	15	45

=== Men ===
Event	Gold		Silver		Bronze	
56 kg	Manueli Tulo; Fiji	225 kg	Lou Guinares; New Zealand	208 kg	Fred Oala; Papua New Guinea	194 kg
62 kg	Vaipava Ioane; Samoa	270 kg	Morea Baru; Papua New Guinea	269 kg	Ianne Guiñares; New Zealand	255 kg
69 kg	Mark Spooner; New Zealand	289 kg	Takenibeia Toromon; Kiribati	275 kg	Manuel Minginfel; Federated States of Micronesia	263 kg
77 kg	François Etoundi; Australia	304 kg	Toafitu Perive; Samoa	297 kg	Mathew Madsen; New Zealand	296 kg
85 kg	Richie Patterson; New Zealand	336 kg	Petunu Opeloge; Samoa	318 kg	Siaosi Leuo; Samoa	301 kg
94 kg	Steven Kari; Papua New Guinea	350 kg	Simplice Ribouem; Australia	349 kg	Caleb Symon; New Zealand	305 kg
105 kg	David Katoatau; Kiribati	344 kg	Stanislav Chalaev; New Zealand	336 kg	Tovia Opeloge; Samoa	335 kg
+105 kg	Itte Detenamo; Nauru	400 kg	Daniel Nemani; Niue	330 kg	Petelo Lagikula; New Caledonia	310 kg

=== Women ===
Event	Gold		Silver		Bronze	
48 kg	Lomina Tibon; Marshall Islands	140 kg	Thelma Toua; Papua New Guinea	130 kg	Seruwaia Malani; Fiji	123 kg
53 kg	Dika Toua; Papua New Guinea	185 kg	Phillipa Hale; New Zealand	173 kg	Tegan Napper; Australia	160 kg
58 kg	Jenly Tegu Wini; Solomon Islands	183 kg	Erika Yamasaki; Australia	176 kg	Socheata Be; Australia	175 kg
63 kg	Seen Lee; Australia	188 kg	Lauren Roberts; New Zealand	173 kg	Julia Timi; Fiji	163 kg
69 kg	Guba Hale; Papua New Guinea	197 kg	Vanissa Lui; Samoa	190 kg	Andrea Miller; New Zealand	184 kg
75 kg	Mary Opeloge; Samoa	240 kg	Apolonia Vaivai; Fiji	205 kg	Kylie Lindbeck; Australia	200 kg
+75 kg	Ele Opeloge; Samoa	271 kg	Deborah Acason; Australia	237 kg	Iuniarra Sipaia; Samoa	229 kg
