= Oala =

Oala is a surname. Notable people with the surname include:

- Fred Oala (born 1996), Papua New Guinean weightlifter
- Lakani Oala (born 1959), Papua New Guinean cricket umpire
