= 2013 Oceania Weightlifting Championships =

International weightlifting competition

- Host city: Brisbane, Australia
- Dates: 11–14 July 2013
- Main venue: Sleeman Centre

The 2013 Oceania Weightlifting Championships took place at the Sleeman Centre in Brisbane, Australia from 11 to 14 July 2013.

== Medal summary ==
Results shown below are for the senior competition only. Junior and youth results are cited here and here respectively.

=== Medal table ===
* Host nation (Australia)

Rank	Nation	Gold	Silver	Bronze	Total
1	Papua New Guinea	4	2	2	8
2	Samoa	4	1	2	7
3	Australia*	2	3	5	10
4	New Zealand	1	5	2	8
5	Nauru	1	0	2	3
6	Fiji	1	0	0	1
6	Kiribati	1	0	0	1
6	Solomon Islands	1	0	0	1
9	Federated States of Micronesia	0	1	1	2
10	Marshall Islands	0	1	0	1
10	Niue	0	1	0	1
10	Palau	0	1	0	1
Totals (12 entries)		15	15	14	44

=== Men ===
Event	Gold		Silver		Bronze	
56 kg	Morea Baru; Papua New Guinea	222 kg	Lou Guinares; New Zealand	208 kg	Fred Oala; Papua New Guinea	204 kg
62 kg	Vaipava Ioane; Samoa	257 kg	Manuel Minginfel; Federated States of Micronesia	257 kg	Ianne Guiñares; New Zealand	256 kg
69 kg	Elson Brechtefield; Nauru	259 kg	Stevick Patris; Palau	255 kg	Chris Rangidimi; Nauru	215 kg
77 kg	François Etoundi; Australia	300 kg	Toafitu Perive; Samoa	284 kg	Mathew Madsen; New Zealand	275 kg
85 kg	Saxon Gregory-Hunt; New Zealand	298 kg	Troy Hewkins; Australia	297 kg	Bob Pesaleli; Samoa	287 kg
94 kg	Steven Kari; Papua New Guinea	334 kg	Zac Grgurevic; Australia	308 kg	Yukio Peter; Nauru	300 kg
105 kg	David Katoatau; Kiribati	349 kg	Andrew Ciancio; New Zealand	326 kg	Maxwell Dal Santo; Australia	324 kg
+105 kg	Damon Kelly; Australia	375 kg	Daniel Nemani; Niue	330 kg	Junior Tasi; Samoa	281 kg

=== Women ===
Event	Gold		Silver		Bronze	
48 kg	Ulina Sagone; Fiji	110 kg	Marine Burns; Marshall Islands	101 kg	Gabe Ovia; Papua New Guinea	95 kg
53 kg	Dika Toua; Papua New Guinea	191 kg	Phillipa Hale; New Zealand	168 kg	Erika Yamasaki; Australia	168 kg
58 kg	Jenly Tegu Wini; Solomon Islands	186 kg	Seen Lee; Australia	186 kg	Amy Dracup; Australia	157 kg
63 kg	Monalisa Kassman; Papua New Guinea	142 kg	Sheena Philips; New Zealand	140 kg	Not awarded (lack of entries)	
69 kg	Vanissa Lui; Samoa	193 kg	Guba Hale; Papua New Guinea	188 kg	Kylie Lindbeck; Australia	178 kg
75 kg	Mary Opeloge; Samoa	238 kg	Lorraine Harry; Papua New Guinea	152 kg	Maria Fathangin; Federated States of Micronesia	122 kg
+75 kg	Ele Opeloge; Samoa	262 kg	Tracey Lambrechs; New Zealand	242 kg	Jenna Myers; Australia	228 kg
