= Solomon Islands at the 2018 Commonwealth Games =

- Flag of Solomon Islands
- CG code: SOL
- CGA: National Olympic Committee of Solomon Islands
- Website: oceaniasport.com/solomon

in Gold Coast, Australia 4 April 2018 – 15 April 2018
- Competitors: 14 in 6 sports
- Flag bearer: Jenly Tegu Wini (opening)
- Medals Ranked 39th: Gold 0 Silver 0 Bronze 1 Total 1

Commonwealth Games appearances (overview)
- 1982; 1986; 1990; 1994; 1998; 2002; 2006; 2010; 2014; 2018; 2022; 2026; 2030

Solomon Islands competed at the 2018 Commonwealth Games in the Gold Coast, Australia from April 4 to April 15, 2018.

Weightlifter Jenly Tegu Wini was the country's flag bearer during the opening ceremony.

Tegu Wini won the country's first ever Commonwealth Games medal, when she won bronze in the women's 58 kg weightlifting event.

== Medalists ==
Medal	Name	Sport	Event	Date
Bronze	Jenly Tegu Wini	Weightlifting	Women's −58 kg	April 6

== Competitors ==
The following is the list of number of competitors participating at the Games per sport/discipline.

Sport	Men	Women	Total
Athletics	2	2	4
Boxing	1	0	1
Swimming	1	1	2
Table tennis	1	1	2
Triathlon	2	0	2
Weightlifting	1	2	3
Total	8	6	14

== Athletics ==
The Solomon Islands participated with 4 athletes (2 men and 2 women).

Track & road events

Athlete	Event	Heat		Semifinal		Final	
Athlete	Event	Result	Rank	Result	Rank	Result	Rank
Kevin Pio	Men's 100 m	11.54	6	did not advance			
Patrick Kam	Men's 5000 m	—N/a				16:08.77	16
Samantha Rofo	Women's 100 m	14.24	7	did not advance			
Sharon Firisua	Women's 5000 m	—N/a				18:52.57	19

== Boxing ==
The Solomon Islands participated with a team of 1 athlete (1 man).

Men

Athlete	Event	Round of 32	Round of 16	Quarterfinals	Semifinals	Final	Rank
Athlete	Event	Opposition Result	Opposition Result	Opposition Result	Opposition Result	Opposition Result	Rank
Henry Kia	−60 kg	Bye	Thadius Katua (PNG); L RSC	did not advance			

== Swimming ==
The Solomon Islands participated with 2 athletes (1 man and 1 woman).

Athlete	Event	Heat		Semifinal		Final	
Athlete	Event	Time	Rank	Time	Rank	Time	Rank
Clayment Lafiara	Men's 50 m freestyle	27.07	58	did not advance			
Angella Charles	Women's 50 m freestyle	36.18	39	did not advance			

== Table tennis ==
The Solomon Islands participated with 2 athletes (1 man and 1 woman).

Singles

Athletes	Event	Group Stage			Round of 64	Round of 32	Round of 16	Quarterfinal	Semifinal	Final	Rank
Athletes	Event	Opposition Score	Opposition Score	Rank	Opposition Score	Opposition Score	Opposition Score	Opposition Score	Opposition Score	Opposition Score	Rank
Gary Nuopula	Men's singles	Loi (PNG); L 0 - 4	Pagarani (BIZ); L 0 - 4	3	did not advance						
Lalmah Sifi	Women's singles	Baah-Danso (GHA); L 0 - 4	Lulu (VAN); L 0 - 4	3	—N/a	did not advance					

Doubles

Athletes	Event	Round of 64	Round of 32	Round of 16	Quarterfinal	Semifinal	Final	Rank
Athletes	Event	Opposition Score	Opposition Score	Opposition Score	Opposition Score	Opposition Score	Opposition Score	Rank
Lalmah Sifi; Gary Nuopula	Mixed doubles	Walker / Payet (ENG); L 0 - 3	did not advance					

== Triathlon ==
The Solomon Islands participated with 2 athletes (2 men).

Individual

Athlete	Event	Swim (750 m)	Trans 1	Bike (20 km)	Trans 2	Run (5 km)	Total	Rank
Patrick Newman	Men's	13:57	0:59	36:24	0:39	22:38	1:14:37	34
Rocky Ratu	Men's	16:30	0:42	36:29	0:39	20:45	1:14:59	35

== Weightlifting ==
The Solomon Islands participated with 3 athletes (1 man and 2 women).

Athlete	Event	Snatch		Clean & Jerk		Total	Rank
Athlete	Event	Result	Rank	Result	Rank	Total	Rank
David Gorosi	Men's −85 kg	115	12	150	12	265	12
Mary Kini Lifu	Women's −53 kg	73	9	93	8	166	9
Jenly Tegu Wini	Women's −58 kg	84	3	105	3	189	3rd place, bronze medalist(s)

== See also ==
- Solomon Islands at the 2018 Summer Youth Olympics
