= Richie Patterson =

New Zealand weightlifter (born 1983)

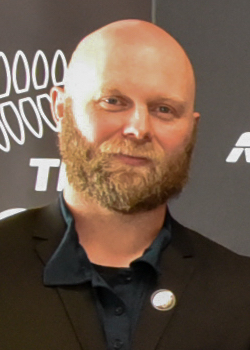
- Patterson in 2021

Personal information
- Full name: Richard John Edward Patterson
- Born: 30 April 1983 (age 43) Auckland, New Zealand
- Height: 1.67 m (5 ft 6 in)
- Weight: 84 kg (185 lb)

Sport
- Country: New Zealand
- Sport: Weightlifting
Medal record
Men's weightlifting
Representing New Zealand
Commonwealth Games
Gold medal – first place	2014 Glasgow	85 kg
Silver medal – second place	2010 Delhi	85 kg
Commonwealth Championships
Gold medal – first place	2012 Apia	85 kg
Gold medal – first place	2013 Penang	85 kg
Silver medal – second place	2016 Penang	85 kg
Oceania Championships
Gold medal – first place	2008 Auckland	94 kg
Gold medal – first place	2012 Apia	85 kg
Gold medal – first place	2014 Le Mont-Dore	85 kg
Gold medal – first place	2016 Suva	85 kg
Silver medal – second place	2010 Suva	94 kg
Silver medal – second place	2017 Gold Coast	85 kg

Richard John Edward Patterson (born 30 April 1983) is a weightlifting competitor for New Zealand.

At the 2010 Commonwealth Games in Delhi he won the silver medal in the men's 85 kg weightlifting event. Four years later, at the 2014 Commonwealth Games in Glasgow, he won the gold medal in the same event. He was New Zealand's flagbearer in the 2014 Commonwealth Games closing ceremony.

To qualify for the 2012 Summer Olympics Patterson had to rely on fellow New Zealand teammate Tavita Ngalu to lift 150 kg at the Oceania Championships. In a selfless act Ngalu did so while injured with ripped quadriceps and New Zealand's highest ranked weightlifter (Patterson) qualified for the Games.

Patterson married fellow weightlifter Phillipa Hale in Glasgow on 31 July 2014, after both had competed in the Commonwealth Games (Hale competed in the women's 53 kg event).

== Major results ==
Year	Venue	Weight	Snatch (kg)				Clean & Jerk (kg)				Total	Rank
Year	Venue	Weight	1	2	3	Rank	1	2	3	Rank	Total	Rank
Representing New Zealand
Olympic Games
2016	Rio de Janeiro, Brazil	85 kg	145	~~149~~	149	16	181	~~186~~	~~187~~	15	330	15
2012	(United Kingdom) London, Great Britain	85 kg	~~150~~	150	~~154~~	14	183	186	~~195~~	12	336	12
2008	Beijing, China	77 kg	130	~~137~~	~~137~~	25	170	~~176~~	~~176~~	18	300	21
World Championships
2009	Goyang, South Korea	85 kg	140	144	~~147~~	18	178	~~184~~	~~184~~	17	322	17
2005	Doha, Qatar	77 kg	~~125~~	125	~~130~~	23	~~155~~	~~155~~	~~155~~	—	—	—
Commonwealth Games
2014	Glasgow, Scotland	85 kg	147	151	~~154~~	1	~~184~~	~~184~~	184	1	335	1st place, gold medalist(s)
2010	Delhi, India	85 kg	142	146	150	1	~~181~~	181	~~189~~	2	331	2nd place, silver medalist(s)
2006	Melbourne, Australia	77 kg	128	135	~~138~~	4	158	~~166~~	~~166~~	4	293	4
