= Fred Oala =

Papua New Guinean weightlifter

Personal information
- Full name: Fred Karoho Oala
- Born: 12 September 1996 (age 29)

Sport
- Country: Papua New Guinea
- Sport: Weightlifting
- Weight class: 56 kg, 62 kg, 69 kg
- Team: National team
Medal record
Men's weightlifting
Representing Papua New Guinea
Oceania Championships
Gold medal – first place	2016 Suva	69 kg
Bronze medal – third place	2012 Apia (Note: Commonwealth Championships also)	56 kg
Bronze medal – third place	2013 Brisbane	56 kg
Bronze medal – third place	2014 Le Mont-Dore	56 kg
Pacific Games
Gold medal – first place	2015 Port Moresby	69 kg (clean & jerk)
Pacific Mini Games
Silver medal – second place	2013 Mata Utu	56 kg
- Updated on 30 January 2022

Fred Karoho Oala (born 12 September 1996) is a Papua New Guinean former weightlifter.

== Biography ==
Oala is partly Motu-Koitabu from Kairuku.

At the age of 13 he was already made his international debut at the 2010 Oceania Weightlifting Championships in Suva, Fiji. At the 2013 Oceania Weightlifting Championships in Brisbane he won a total of three medals. He won the bronze medal in both the senior male and youth divisions, and gold the gold medal in the junior division. In addition to these achievements, he was awarded the Best Youth Male Lifter title.

He won the two silver medals and a bronze medal at the 2013 Pacific Mini Games.

He participated at the 2014 Commonwealth Games in the 56 kg event. Days before the event his weightlifting shoes, that were held together with yellow tape, fell apart. With help from a volunteer he received a pair to borrow and the volunteer ordered for him a new pair of weightlifting shoes from a specialist supplier.

From late 2014 he started training at Oceania Weightlifting Institute Centre (OWIC) in Noumea, New Caledonia where he replaced Stevan Kari. In this perion changed from the 56 kg division to the 62 kg division to the 69 kg division. At these 2015 Pacific Games in Port Moresby he won the bronze medal in the clean & jerk his new 69 kg category division. He won alongside the Games also the silver medal at the Oceania Junior Championships.

He continued training in 2015 and 2016 at the Oceania Weightlifting Institute Centre.

In 2016 he won the gold medal at the 2016 Oceania Weightlifting Championships.

== Major competitions ==
Year	Venue	Weight	Snatch (kg)				Clean & Jerk (kg)				Total	Rank
Year	Venue	Weight	1	2	3	Rank	1	2	3	Rank	Total	Rank
Commonwealth Games
2014	Glasgow, Scotland	56 kg	~~85~~	~~85~~	85	—N/a	110	~~115~~	118	—N/a	203	8
Pacific Games
2015	Port Moresby, Papua New Guinea	69 kg	110	~~114~~	~~116~~	7	145	150	154	3rd place, bronze medalist(s)	264	4

Medalbox note
