= Petunu Opeloge =

Samoan weightlifter (born 1994)

Personal information
- Full name: Petunu Opeloge
- Born: 27 June 1994 (age 31)
- Weight: 84.39 kg (186.0 lb)

Sport
- Country: Samoa
- Sport: Weightlifting
- Weight class: 85 kg
- Team: National team
Medal record
Men's weightlifting
Representing Samoa
Pacific Games
Gold medal – first place	2015 Port Moresby	85 kg
Oceania Championships
Gold medal – first place	2015 Port Moresby	85 kg
Silver medal – second place	2010 Suva	85 kg
Silver medal – second place	2014 Le Mont-Dore	85 kg
Silver medal – second place	2016 Suva	85 kg
Silver medal – second place	2018 Le Mont-Dore	94 kg
Arafura Games
Gold medal – first place	2019 Darwin	102 kg
- Updated on 27 January 2022

Petunu Opeloge (born 27 June 1994) is a Samoan male weightlifter, competing in the 85 kg category and representing Samoa at international competitions. Opeloge won the silver medal at the 2013 Pacific Mini Games, 2015 Pacific Games and also the silver medal at the 2016 Oceania Weightlifting Championships. He participated at the 2010 Commonwealth Games in the 85 kg event and the 2014 Commonwealth Games.

== Major competitions ==
Year	Venue	Weight	Snatch (kg)				Clean & Jerk (kg)				Total	Rank
Year	Venue	Weight	1	2	3	Rank	1	2	3	Rank	Total	Rank
Commonwealth Games
2010	Delhi, India	85 kg	110	~~115~~	115	—N/a	140	~~145~~	~~145~~	—N/a	255	13
2014	Glasgow, Scotland	85 kg	135	140	~~143~~	—N/a	172	~~180~~	~~185~~	—N/a	312	6
