= 2012 Oceania Weightlifting Championships =

International weightlifting competition

- Host city: Apia, Samoa
- Dates: 6–9 June 2012
- Main venue: Faleata Sports Complex

The 2012 Oceania Weightlifting Championships took place at the Faleata Sports Complex in Apia, Samoa from 6 to 9 June 2012. Together with that year's Commonwealth Championships, they were held concurrently as a single event designated the 2012 Oceania & Commonwealth Weightlifting Championships.

== Medal summary ==
Results shown below are for the senior competition only. Junior and youth results are cited here and here respectively.

=== Medal table ===
* Host nation (Samoa)

Rank	Nation	Gold	Silver	Bronze	Total
1	Samoa*	4	2	2	8
2	Kiribati	3	0	0	3
3	Fiji	2	2	1	5
4	Papua New Guinea	2	1	2	5
5	Australia	1	6	3	10
6	New Zealand	1	1	5	7
7	Solomon Islands	1	1	0	2
8	Micronesia	1	0	0	1
9	Nauru	0	2	0	2
10	Niue	0	0	1	1
10	Tonga	0	0	1	1
Totals (11 entries)		15	15	15	45

=== Men ===
Event	Gold		Silver		Bronze	
56 kg	Manueli Tulo; Fiji	237 kg	Elson Brechtefeld; Nauru	217 kg	Fred Oala; Papua New Guinea	188 kg
62 kg	Manuel Minginfel; Micronesia	280 kg	Daniel Koum; Australia	250 kg	Ianne Guiñares; New Zealand	239 kg
69 kg	Takenibeia Toromon; Kiribati	267 kg	Tevita Tawai; Fiji	240 kg	Vester Villalon; New Zealand	237 kg
77 kg	Toafitu Perive; Samoa	288 kg	Ben Turner; Australia	282 kg	Bob Pesaleli; Samoa	277 kg
85 kg	Richie Patterson; New Zealand	334 kg	Steven Kari; Papua New Guinea	324 kg	Uati Maposua; Samoa	300 kg
94 kg	David Katoatau; Kiribati	330 kg	Chris Ciancio; Australia	300 kg	Saxon Gregory-Hunt; New Zealand	282 kg
105 kg	Meamea Thomas; Kiribati	330 kg	Tovia Opeloge; Samoa	317 kg	Robert Galsworthy; Australia	317 kg
+105 kg	Damon Kelly; Australia	390 kg	Itte Detenamo; Nauru	380 kg	Daniel Nemani; Niue	310 kg

=== Women ===
Event	Gold		Silver		Bronze	
48 kg	Kathleen Hare; Papua New Guinea	135 kg	Seruwaia Malani; Fiji	110 kg	Charlotte Moss; New Zealand	93 kg
53 kg	Dika Toua; Papua New Guinea	182 kg	Socheata Be; Australia	150 kg	Phillipa Hale; New Zealand	146 kg
58 kg	Maria Liku; Fiji	188 kg	Jenly Tegu Wini; Solomon Islands	161 kg	Christine Meier; Australia	154 kg
63 kg	Hapilyn Iro; Solomon Islands	164 kg	Melissa Robinson; Australia	155 kg	Tuipulotu Fakaola; Tonga	147 kg
69 kg	Tauimani Ah Kuoi; Samoa	183 kg	Vanissa Lui; Samoa	179 kg	Guba Hale; Papua New Guinea	165 kg
75 kg	Mary Opeloge; Samoa	223 kg	Jenna Myers; Australia	211 kg	Apolonia Vaivai; Fiji	193 kg
+75 kg	Ele Opeloge; Samoa	264 kg	Tracey Lambrechs; New Zealand	234 kg	Deborah Acason; Australia	223 kg
