= Weightlifting at the 2010 Commonwealth Games – Men's 56 kg =

The Men's 56 kg weightlifting competition took place on 4 October. The weightlifter from Malaysia won the gold, with a combined lift of 257 kg.

== Athletes ==
13 lifters were selected for the games.

	Athlete	Year of birth
1	Daniel Darko (GHA)	1986
2	Sukhen Dey (IND)	1989
3	V. S. Rao (IND)	1981
4	Amirul Ibrahim (MAS)	1981
5	Mohd Ismail (MAS)	1988
6	Marc Coret (MRI)	1989
7	Elson Brechtefeld (NRU)	1994
8	Lou Guinares (NZL)	1990
9	Abdullah Ghafoor (PAK)	1986
10	Morea Baru (PNG)	1990
11	Kamal Bandara (SRI)	1985
12	Sangeth Wijesooriya (SRI)	1984
13	Ismail Katamba (UGA)	1987

== Results ==
Rank	Name	Country	B.weight (kg)	Snatch (kg)	Clean & Jerk (kg)	Total (kg)
1st place, gold medalist(s)	Amirul Ibrahim	Malaysia	55.39	116	141	257
2nd place, silver medalist(s)	Sukhen Dey	India	55.57	112	140	252
3rd place, bronze medalist(s)	V. S. Rao	India	55.66	107	141	248
4	Abdullah Ghafoor	Pakistan	55.57	104	133	237
5	Kamal Bandara	Sri Lanka	55.68	103	130	233
6	Sangeth Wijesooriya	Sri Lanka	55.29	98	120	218
7	Lou Guinares	New Zealand	55.46	94	124	218
8	Marc Coret	Mauritius	55.23	90	120	210
9	Elson Brechtefeld	Nauru	55.57	92	115	207
10	Morea Baru	Papua New Guinea	55.36	90	115	205
-	Mohd Ismail	Malaysia	55.56	109	-	DNF
-	Ismail Katamba	Uganda	55.83	90	-	DNF

== See also ==
- 2010 Commonwealth Games
- Weightlifting at the 2010 Commonwealth Games
