= Stanislav Chalaev =

New Zealand weightlifter (born 1986)

Personal information
- Nickname: Stas
- Nationality: New Zealand / Russian
- Born: 16 October 1986 (age 39) Tomsk, Soviet Union
- Education: Auckland Grammar School
- Height: 1.78 m (5 ft 10 in)
- Weight: 103 kg (227 lb)

Sport
- Country: New Zealand
- Sport: Olympic Weightlifting
Medal record
Men's weightlifting
Representing New Zealand
Commonwealth Games
Silver medal – second place	2010 Delhi	105 kg
Silver medal – second place	2014 Glasgow	105 kg
Commonwealth Championships
Bronze medal – third place	2009 Penang	105 kg
Oceania Championships
Silver medal – second place	2008 Auckland	105 kg
Silver medal – second place	2010 Suva	105 kg
Silver medal – second place	2014 Le Mont-Dore	105 kg
Bronze medal – third place	2017 Gold Coast	105 kg

Stanislav Chalaev (born 16 October 1986) is a weightlifter from New Zealand.

At the 2010 Commonwealth Games he won the silver medal in the 105 kg class. Chalaev again won silver at the 2014 Commonwealth Games in the same weight class.
