= Weightlifting at the 2018 Commonwealth Games – Women's 58 kg =

Weightlifting – Women's 58 kg at the 2018 Commonwealth Games
- Venue: Carrara Sports and Leisure Centre
- Dates: 6 April 2018
- Competitors: 15 from 15 nations
- Winning total weight: 201

Medalists
gold medal	Tia-Clair Toomey	Australia
silver medal	Tali Darsigny	Canada
bronze medal	Jenly Tegu Wini	Solomon Islands

The Women's 58 kg weightlifting event at the 2018 Commonwealth Games took place at the Carrara Sports and Leisure Centre on 6 April 2018. The weightlifter from Australia won the gold, with a combined lift of 201 kg.

== Records ==
Prior to this competition, the existing world, Commonwealth and Games records were as follows:

World record	Snatch	Boyanka Kostova (AZE)	112 kg	Houston, United States	23 November 2015
World record	Clean & Jerk	Kuo Hsing-chun (TPE)	142 kg	Taipei, Taiwan	21 August 2017
World record	Total	Boyanka Kostova (AZE)	252 kg	Houston, United States	23 November 2015
Commonwealth record	Snatch	Seen Lee (AUS)	96 kg	Melbourne, Australia	20 December 2008
Commonwealth record	Clean & Jerk	Chinenye Fidelis (NGR)	122 kg	Yaounde, Cameroon	10 May 2016
Commonwealth record	Total	Michaela Breeze (WAL)	212 kg	Kyiv, Ukraine	21 April 2004
Games record	Snatch	Michaela Breeze (WAL)	93 kg	Glasgow, Scotland	26 July 2014
Games record	Clean & Jerk	Zoe Smith (ENG)	118 kg	Glasgow, Scotland	26 July 2014
Games record	Total	Zoe Smith (ENG)	210 kg	Glasgow, Scotland	26 July 2014

== Schedule ==
All times are Australian Eastern Standard Time (UTC+10)

Date	Time	Round
Friday 6 April 2018	18:42	Final

== Results ==
Rank	Athlete	Body weight (kg)	Snatch (kg)				Clean & Jerk (kg)				Total
Rank	Athlete	Body weight (kg)	1	2	3	Result	1	2	3	Result	Total
1st place, gold medalist(s)	Tia-Clair Toomey (AUS)	57.70	80	84	87	87	107	111	114	114	201
2nd place, silver medalist(s)	Tali Darsigny (CAN)	57.93	85	88	~~90~~	88	105	109	112	112	200
3rd place, bronze medalist(s)	Jenly Tegu Wini (SOL)	57.55	80	84	~~87~~	84	105	~~111~~	-	105	189
4	Laura Hewitt (ENG)	57.71	79	82	84	84	~~98~~	98	~~106~~	98	182
5	Alethea Boon (NZL)	57.70	76	79	81	81	92	96	100	100	181
6	Johanni Taljaard (RSA)	56.92	74	78	~~81~~	78	~~93~~	93	~~97~~	93	171
7	Christie Williams (WAL)	57.82	~~75~~	75	~~80~~	75	95	~~99~~	~~99~~	95	170
8	Ketty Lent (MRI)	57.50	67	72	~~74~~	72	85	91	~~93~~	91	163
9	Jodey Hughes (SCO)	57.85	70	~~73~~	~~73~~	70	90	~~92~~	~~92~~	90	160
10	Nadeeshani Rajapaksha (SRI)	57.56	~~66~~	66	~~69~~	66	94	~~98~~	~~98~~	94	160
11	Marceeta Marlyne Marcus (MAS)	57.24	~~65~~	65	~~68~~	65	90	~~93~~	~~93~~	90	155
12	Maria Mareta (FIJ)	57.82	~~68~~	68	~~72~~	68	83	86	~~90~~	86	154
13	Fayema Akther (BAN)	57.01	63	66	~~69~~	66	80	85	88	88	154
14	Winny Langat (KEN)	56.94	60	~~65~~	~~65~~	60	~~75~~	75	~~80~~	75	135
	Saraswati Rout (IND)	57.79	~~78~~	~~78~~	~~78~~	—					DNF
