= 2018 Oceania Weightlifting Championships =

International weightlifting competition

- Host city: Le Mont-Dore, New Caledonia
- Dates: 26–30 June 2018
- Main venue: Complexe Sportif de Boulari

The 2018 Oceania Weightlifting Championships took place at the Complexe Sportif de Boulari in Le Mont-Dore, New Caledonia from 26 to 30 June 2018.

Results shown below are for the senior competition only. Junior and youth results are cited here and here respectively.

== Medal tables ==
Ranking by Big (Total result) medals

* Host nation (New Caledonia)

| Rank | Nation | Gold | Silver | Bronze | Total |
|---|---|---|---|---|---|
| 1 | Papua New Guinea | 4 | 0 | 0 | 4 |
| 2 | Nauru | 3 | 4 | 4 | 11 |
| 3 | New Zealand | 3 | 2 | 5 | 10 |
| 4 | Samoa | 2 | 2 | 1 | 5 |
| 5 | Kiribati | 2 | 0 | 1 | 3 |
| 6 | Marshall Islands | 1 | 1 | 0 | 2 |
| 6 | Solomon Islands | 1 | 1 | 0 | 2 |
| 8 | Australia | 0 | 2 | 2 | 4 |
| 9 | Guam | 0 | 2 | 0 | 2 |
| 10 | New Caledonia* | 0 | 1 | 1 | 2 |
| Totals (10 entries) | | 16 | 15 | 14 | 45 |

Ranking by all medals: Big (Total result) and Small (Snatch and Clean & Jerk)

* Host nation (New Caledonia)

| Rank | Nation | Gold | Silver | Bronze | Total |
|---|---|---|---|---|---|
| 1 | Papua New Guinea | 10 | 2 | 0 | 12 |
| 2 | Nauru | 9 | 11 | 13 | 33 |
| 3 | New Zealand | 9 | 6 | 15 | 30 |
| 4 | Samoa | 8 | 4 | 3 | 15 |
| 5 | Kiribati | 5 | 2 | 1 | 8 |
| 6 | Solomon Islands | 4 | 2 | 0 | 6 |
| 7 | Marshall Islands | 3 | 2 | 1 | 6 |
| 8 | Australia | 0 | 7 | 5 | 12 |
| 9 | Guam | 0 | 6 | 0 | 6 |
| 10 | New Caledonia* | 0 | 3 | 4 | 7 |
| Totals (10 entries) | | 48 | 45 | 42 | 135 |

== Medal summary ==
=== Men ===
| Event | Gold | | Silver | | Bronze | |
56 kg
| Snatch | Mike Riklon; Marshall Islands | 64 kg | Avery Fesolai; New Zealand | 63 kg | Not awarded (lack of entries) | |
| Clean & Jerk | Mike Riklon; Marshall Islands | 90 kg | Avery Fesolai; New Zealand | 81 kg | Not awarded (lack of entries) | |
| Total | Mike Riklon; Marshall Islands | 154 kg | Avery Fesolai; New Zealand | 144 kg | Not awarded (lack of entries) | |
62 kg
| Snatch | Morea Baru; Papua New Guinea | 120 kg | Elson Brechtefield; Nauru | 108 kg | Ezekiel Moses; Nauru | 105 kg |
| Clean & Jerk | Morea Baru; Papua New Guinea | 160 kg | Elson Brechtefield; Nauru | 140 kg | Ezekiel Moses; Nauru | 135 kg |
| Total | Morea Baru; Papua New Guinea | 280 kg | Elson Brechtefield; Nauru | 248 kg | Ezekiel Moses; Nauru | 240 kg |
69 kg
| Snatch | Ruben Katoatau; Kiribati | 120 kg | Larko Doguape; Nauru | 110 kg | Curran Power; New Zealand | 108 kg |
| Clean & Jerk | Ruben Katoatau; Kiribati | 150 kg | Larko Doguape; Nauru | 138 kg | Uea Detudamo; Nauru | 135 kg |
| Total | Ruben Katoatau; Kiribati | 270 kg | Larko Doguape; Nauru | 248 kg | Uea Detudamo; Nauru | 242 kg |
77 kg
| Snatch | Ika Aliklik; Nauru | 122 kg | Taretiita Tabaroua; Kiribati | 120 kg | Damien Daver; New Caledonia | 115 kg |
| Clean & Jerk | Taretiita Tabaroua; Kiribati | 170 kg | Joshua Wu; Australia | 150 kg | Ika Aliklik; Nauru | 146 kg |
| Total | Taretiita Tabaroua; Kiribati | 290 kg | Ika Aliklik; Nauru | 268 kg | Joshua Wu; Australia | 260 kg |
85 kg
| Snatch | Don Opeloge; Samoa | 145 kg | Cameron Smith; New Zealand | 126 kg | Kabuati Bob; Marshall Islands | 125 kg |
| Clean & Jerk | Don Opeloge; Samoa | 180 kg | Kabuati Bob; Marshall Islands | 163 kg | Tom-Jaye Waibeiya; Nauru | 160 kg |
| Total | Don Opeloge; Samoa | 325 kg | Kabuati Bob; Marshall Islands | 288 kg | Cameron Smith; New Zealand | 282 kg |
94 kg
| Snatch | Petunu Opeloge; Samoa | 142 kg | Steven Kari; Papua New Guinea | 140 kg | Douglas Sekone-Fraser; New Zealand | 135 kg |
| Clean & Jerk | Steven Kari; Papua New Guinea | 200 kg | Petunu Opeloge; Samoa | 175 kg | Douglas Sekone-Fraser; New Zealand | 163 kg |
| Total | Steven Kari; Papua New Guinea | 340 kg | Petunu Opeloge; Samoa | 317 kg | Douglas Sekone-Fraser; New Zealand | 298 kg |
105 kg
| Snatch | Koriata Petelo; Samoa | 146 kg | Jackson Roberts-Young; Australia | 145 kg | Andrius Barakauskas; New Zealand | 143 kg |
| Clean & Jerk | Koriata Petelo; Samoa | 195 kg | Jackson Roberts-Young; Australia | 187 kg | Andrius Barakauskas; New Zealand | 168 kg |
| Total | Koriata Petelo; Samoa | 341 kg | Jackson Roberts-Young; Australia | 332 kg | Andrius Barakauskas; New Zealand | 311 kg |
+105 kg
| Snatch | David Liti; New Zealand | 160 kg | Leon Likafia; New Caledonia | 108 kg | Kyle Michel; New Caledonia | 102 kg |
| Clean & Jerk | David Liti; New Zealand | 200 kg | Leon Likafia; New Caledonia | 132 kg | Kyle Michel; New Caledonia | 120 kg |
| Total | David Liti; New Zealand | 360 kg | Leon Likafia; New Caledonia | 240 kg | Kyle Michel; New Caledonia | 222 kg |

=== Women ===
| Event | Gold | | Silver | | Bronze | |
48 kg
| Snatch | Thelma Toua; Papua New Guinea | 65 kg | Dayalani Calma; Guam | 45 kg | Carmen Deidenang; Nauru | 35 kg |
| Clean & Jerk | Thelma Toua; Papua New Guinea | 85 kg | Dayalani Calma; Guam | 60 kg | Carmen Deidenang; Nauru | 45 kg |
| Total | Thelma Toua; Papua New Guinea | 150 kg | Dayalani Calma; Guam | 105 kg | Carmen Deidenang; Nauru | 80 kg |
53 kg
| Snatch | Mary Kini Lifu; Solomon Islands | 74 kg | Dika Toua; Papua New Guinea | 71 kg | Natalia Chorobczyk; Australia | 68 kg |
| Clean & Jerk | Dika Toua; Papua New Guinea | 93 kg | Mary Kini Lifu; Solomon Islands | 89 kg | Natalia Chorobczyk; Australia | 82 kg |
| Total | Dika Toua; Papua New Guinea | 164 kg | Mary Kini Lifu; Solomon Islands | 163 kg | Natalia Chorobczyk; Australia | 150 kg |
58 kg
| Snatch | Jenly Tegu Wini; Solomon Islands | 82 kg | Nancy Genzel Abouke; Nauru | 70 kg | Bernada Uepa; Nauru | 68 kg |
| Clean & Jerk | Jenly Tegu Wini; Solomon Islands | 110 kg | Bernada Uepa; Nauru | 92 kg | Nancy Genzel Abouke; Nauru | 92 kg |
| Total | Jenly Tegu Wini; Solomon Islands | 192 kg | Nancy Genzel Abouke; Nauru | 162 kg | Bernada Uepa; Nauru | 160 kg |
63 kg
| Snatch | Maximina Uepa; Nauru | 75 kg | Jacinta Sumagaysay; Guam | 73 kg | Elizabeth Bateman; New Zealand | 70 kg |
| Clean & Jerk | Maximina Uepa; Nauru | 100 kg | Jacinta Sumagaysay; Guam | 95 kg | Samara Wright; New Zealand | 90 kg |
| Total | Maximina Uepa; Nauru | 175 kg | Jacinta Sumagaysay; Guam | 168 kg | Samara Wright; New Zealand | 155 kg |
69 kg
| Snatch | Emma Wright; New Zealand | 82 kg | Samantha Hansen; New Zealand | 77 kg | Madeline Wu; Australia | 75 kg |
| Clean & Jerk | Emma Wright; New Zealand | 99 kg | Tiiau Bakaekiri; Kiribati | 95 kg | Samantha Hansen; New Zealand | 94 kg |
| Total | Emma Wright; New Zealand | 181 kg | Samantha Hansen; New Zealand | 171 kg | Tiiau Bakaekiri; Kiribati | 167 kg |
75 kg
| Snatch | Kanah Andrews-Nahu; New Zealand | 90 kg | Kylie Lindbeck; Australia | 90 kg | Zoe Glasson; New Zealand | 76 kg |
| Clean & Jerk | Kanah Andrews-Nahu; New Zealand | 104 kg | Kylie Lindbeck; Australia | 100 kg | Zoe Glasson; New Zealand | 92 kg |
| Total | Kanah Andrews-Nahu; New Zealand | 194 kg | Kylie Lindbeck; Australia | 190 kg | Zoe Glasson; New Zealand | 168 kg |
90 kg
| Snatch | Roviel Detenamo; Nauru | 70 kg | Not awarded (lack of entries) | | | |
| Clean & Jerk | Roviel Detenamo; Nauru | 92 kg | Not awarded (lack of entries) | | | |
| Total | Roviel Detenamo; Nauru | 162 kg | Not awarded (lack of entries) | | | |
+90 kg
| Snatch | Iuniarra Sipaia; Samoa | 106 kg | Charisma Amoe-Tarrant; Nauru | 105 kg | Lesila Fiapule; Samoa | 90 kg |
| Clean & Jerk | Charisma Amoe-Tarrant; Nauru | 145 kg | Iuniarra Sipaia; Samoa | 136 kg | Lesila Fiapule; Samoa | 114 kg |
| Total | Charisma Amoe-Tarrant; Nauru | 250 kg | Iuniarra Sipaia; Samoa | 242 kg | Lesila Fiapule; Samoa | 204 kg |
