= Lorraine Harry =

Papua New Guinean weightlifter

Personal information
- Full name: Lorraine Henao Harry
- Born: 20 February 1996 (age 30)

Sport
- Country: Papua New Guinea
- Sport: Weightlifting
Medal record
Women's weightlifting
Representing Papua New Guinea
Commonwealth Championships
| Bronze medal – third place | 2019 Apia | 87 kg |
Oceania Championships
| Silver medal – second place | 2013 Brisbane | 75 kg |
| Silver medal – second place | 2019 Apia | 87 kg |
| Bronze medal – third place | 2017 Gold Coast | 90 kg |
Pacific Games
| Silver medal – second place | 2019 Apia | 87 kg |
Pacific Mini Games
| Silver medal – second place | 2017 Port Vila | 90 kg |
| Bronze medal – third place | 2013 Mata Utu | 75 kg |

Lorraine Henao Harry (born 20 February 1996) is a Papua New Guinean weightlifter. She represented Papua New Guinea at the 2019 Pacific Games and she won the silver medal in the women's 87 kg event.

In 2017, at the Asian Indoor and Martial Arts Games held in Ashgabat, Turkmenistan, she finished in 6th place in the women's 90 kg event.

In 2018, she represented Papua New Guinea at the Commonwealth Games held in Gold Coast, Australia. She finished in 7th place in the women's 90 kg event.
