= Siaosi Leuo =

Samoan weightlifter (born 1992)

Personal information
- Full name: Siaosi Leuo
- Born: 26 October 1992 (age 33)
- Weight: 83.96 kg (185.1 lb)

Sport
- Country: Samoa
- Sport: Weightlifting
- Weight class: 85 kg
- Team: National team
Medal record
Men's Weightlifting
Representing Samoa
Pacific Games
Silver medal – second place	2015 Apia	94 kg
Commonwealth Championships
Gold medal – first place	2015 Pune	94 kg
Silver medal – second place	2017 Gold Coast	94 kg
Oceania Championships
Gold medal – first place	2016 Suva	94 kg
Silver medal – second place	2015 Apia	94 kg
Silver medal – second place	2017 Gold Coast	94 kg
Bronze medal – third place	2014 Le Mont-Dore	85 kg
- Updated on 27 January 2022

Siaosi Leuo (born 26 October 1992) is a Samoan male weightlifter, competing in the 85 kg category and representing Samoa at international competitions. He participated at the 2014 Commonwealth Games in the 85 kg event. He won the silver medal at the 2015 Pacific Games, lifting a total of 343 kg. At the 2016 Oceania Weightlifting Championships he won the gold medal, lifting a total of 336 kg.

== Major competitions ==
Year	Venue	Weight	Snatch (kg)				Clean & Jerk (kg)				Total	Rank
Year	Venue	Weight	1	2	3	Rank	1	2	3	Rank	Total	Rank
Commonwealth Games
2014	Glasgow, Scotland	85 kg	~~127~~	127	132	—N/a	166	171	~~175~~	—N/a	303	7
