= Taretiita Tabaroua =

Kiribati weightlifter

Personal information
- Full name: Taretiita Baraniko Tabaroua
- Born: 29 November 1994 (age 31)
- Weight: 75.94 kg (167.4 lb)

Sport
- Country: Kiribati
- Sport: Weightlifting
- Weight class: 77 kg
- Team: National team
Medal record
Men's weightlifting
Representing Kiribati
Pacific Games
| Silver medal – second place | 2019 Apia | 73 kg |
| Bronze medal – third place | 2015 Port Moresby | 77 kg |
Oceania Championships
| Gold medal – first place | 2017 Gold Coast | 77 kg |
| Gold medal – first place | 2018 Le Mont-Dore | 77 kg |
| Silver medal – second place | 2016 Suva | 77 kg |
| Silver medal – second place | 2019 Apia | 73 kg |
| Bronze medal – third place | 2015 Port Moresby | 77 kg |
- Updated on 26 January 2022

Taretiita Baraniko Tabaroua (born 29 November 1994) is an I-Kiribati male weightlifter, competing in the 77 kg category and representing Kiribati at international competitions. He won the silver medal at the 2016 Oceania Weightlifting Championships, lifting a total of 290 kg. He participated at the 2014 Commonwealth Games in the 77 kg event.

== Major competitions ==
| Year | Venue | Weight | Snatch (kg) | | | | Clean & Jerk (kg) | | | | Total | Rank |
| Year | Venue | Weight | 1 | 2 | 3 | Rank | 1 | 2 | 3 | Rank | Total | Rank |
Commonwealth Games
| 2014 | Glasgow, Scotland | 77 kg | 105 | 110 | ~~118~~ | —N/a | 135 | 145 | ~~150~~ | —N/a | 255 | 17 |
