= Morea Baru =

Papua New Guinean Olympic weightlifter

Morea Baru OLY
Personal information
- Nationality: Papua New Guinean
- Born: 15 April 1990 (age 36) Port Moresby, Papua New Guinea
- Height: 1.62 m (5 ft 4 in)
- Weight: 61 kg (134 lb)

Sport
- Country: Papua New Guinea
- Sport: Weightlifting
Medal record
Men's weightlifting
Representing Papua New Guinea
Pacific Games
Gold medal – first place	2015 Port Moresby	62 kg
Gold medal – first place	2019 Apia	61 kg
Silver medal – second place	2011 Nouméa	56 kg
Commonwealth Games
Silver medal – second place	2018 Gold Coast	62 kg
Silver medal – second place	2022 Birmingham	61 kg
Bronze medal – third place	2026 Glasgow	65 kg
Commonwealth Championships
Gold medal – first place	2017 Gold Coast	62 kg
Gold medal – first place	2019 Apia	61 kg
Oceania Championships
Gold medal – first place	2013 Brisbane	56 kg
Gold medal – first place	2015 Port Moresby	62 kg
Gold medal – first place	2016 Suva	62 kg
Gold medal – first place	2017 Gold Coast	62 kg
Gold medal – first place	2018 Le Mont-Dore	62 kg
Gold medal – first place	2019 Apia	61 kg
Gold medal – first place	2021 Oceania	61 kg
Gold medal – first place	2022 Saipan	61 kg
Gold medal – first place	2024 Auckland	61 kg
Gold medal – first place	2025 Meyuns	65 kg
Gold medal – first place	2026 Apia	65 kg
Silver medal – second place	2014 Le Mont-Dore	62 kg

Morea Baru (born 15 April 1990) is a Papua New Guinean Olympic weightlifter. He competed at three Summer Olympics achieving the best result of fifth place in 2024 in Paris, France.

== Career ==
He competed at the 2016 Oceania Weightlifting Championship in Suva, Fiji and won with a total lift of 283 kg. Baru also participated at the Australian International Open in March 2016 and also took top honours with a total of 291 kg. He competed at the 2014 Commonwealth Games and finished fourth.

Baru finished in top ten for three times at the Olympics. He was sixth in 2016 in Rio de Janeiro, tenth in 2021 in Tokyo and fifth in 2024 in Paris. He is also a nine-time Oceania champion.

== Major results ==
Year	Venue	Weight	Snatch (kg)				Clean & Jerk (kg)				Total	Rank
Year	Venue	Weight	1	2	3	Rank	1	2	3	Rank	Total	Rank
Summer Olympics
2016	Rio de Janeiro, Brazil	62 kg	122	126	~~129~~	—N/a	159	164	~~168~~	—N/a	290	6
2021	Tokyo, Japan	61 kg	113	~~118~~	118	—N/a	147	~~153~~	~~153~~	—N/a	265	10
2024	Paris, France	61 kg	118	~~122~~	~~122~~	—N/a	150	157	161	—N/a	279	5
World Championships
2015	Houston, United States	62 kg	115	~~120~~	120	28	~~150~~	150	~~158~~	25	270	27
2019	Pattaya, Thailand	61 kg	120	~~124~~	~~124~~	20	~~156~~	156	~~160~~	11	276	16
2022	Bogotá, Colombia	61 kg	110	115	~~118~~	26	143	~~148~~	~~150~~	24	258	25
2023	Riyadh, Saudi Arabia	61 kg	120	~~123~~	~~123~~	21	153	~~156~~	156	16	276	19
2026	Ningbo, China	65 kg	120	~~123~~	~~123~~	26	150	~~155~~	155	21	275	24
Oceania Championships
2010	Suva, Fiji	56 kg	85	~~90~~	~~90~~	6	110	~~115~~	115	5	200	5
2011	Darwin, Australia	62 kg	95			5	130			3rd place, bronze medalist(s)	225	4
2012	Apia, Samoa	62 kg	100	~~105~~	105	3rd place, bronze medalist(s)	130	~~135~~	~~135~~	4	235	4
2013	Brisbane, Australia	56 kg	94	~~98~~	~~98~~	1st place, gold medalist(s)	121	128	~~132~~	1st place, gold medalist(s)	222	1st place, gold medalist(s)
2014	Mont-Dore, New Caledonia	62 kg	115	119	~~122~~	2nd place, silver medalist(s)	150	~~155~~	~~155~~	2nd place, silver medalist(s)	269	2nd place, silver medalist(s)
2015	Port Moresby, Papua New Guinea	62 kg	118	121	~~124~~	1st place, gold medalist(s)	155	~~158~~	~~158~~	2nd place, silver medalist(s)	276	1st place, gold medalist(s)
2016	Suva, Fiji	62 kg	120	~~125~~	~~125~~	1st place, gold medalist(s)	162	~~163~~	163	1st place, gold medalist(s)	283	1st place, gold medalist(s)
2017	Gold Coast, Australia	62 kg	120	~~124~~	~~125~~	1st place, gold medalist(s)	156	~~162~~	162	1st place, gold medalist(s)	282	1st place, gold medalist(s)
2018	Mont-Dore, New Caledonia	62 kg	110	115	120	1st place, gold medalist(s)	141	150	160	1st place, gold medalist(s)	280	1st place, gold medalist(s)
2019	Apia, Samoa	61 kg	115	120	124	1st place, gold medalist(s)	150	160	~~164~~	1st place, gold medalist(s)	284	1st place, gold medalist(s)
2021	Various, Oceania	61 kg	110	115	~~120~~	1st place, gold medalist(s)	140	145	150	1st place, gold medalist(s)	265	1st place, gold medalist(s)
2022	Saipan, Northern Mariana Islands	61 kg	101	110	~~120~~	1st place, gold medalist(s)	133	140	151	1st place, gold medalist(s)	261	1st place, gold medalist(s)
2024	Auckland, New Zealand	61 kg	~~112~~	112	~~120~~	1st place, gold medalist(s)	150	~~160~~	~~160~~	1st place, gold medalist(s)	262	1st place, gold medalist(s)
Commonwealth Games
2010	Delhi, India	56 kg	85	90	~~95~~	—N/a	115	~~120~~	~~125~~	—N/a	205	10
2014	(United Kingdom) Glasgow, Great Britain	62 kg	115	~~120~~	120	—N/a	~~149~~	~~149~~	150	—N/a	270	4
2018	Gold Coast, Australia	62 kg	123	127	~~130~~	—N/a	~~159~~	159	~~163~~	—N/a	286	2nd place, silver medalist(s)
2022	Birmingham, England	61 kg	114	118	121	—N/a	152	~~165~~	~~165~~	—N/a	273	2nd place, silver medalist(s)
2026	Glasgow, Scotland	65 kg	120	~~124~~	125	—N/a	157	~~162~~	~~162~~	—N/a	282	3rd place, bronze medalist(s)
Pacific Games
2011	Nouméa, New Caledonia	56 kg	95	~~100~~	~~100~~	2nd place, silver medalist(s)	125	~~130~~	~~135~~	2nd place, silver medalist(s)	220	2nd place, silver medalist(s)
2015	Port Moresby, Papua New Guinea	62 kg	118	121	~~124~~	1st place, gold medalist(s)	155	~~158~~	~~158~~	2nd place, silver medalist(s)	276	1st place, gold medalist(s)
2019	Apia, Samoa	61 kg	115	120	124	1st place, gold medalist(s)	150	160	~~164~~	1st place, gold medalist(s)	284	1st place, gold medalist(s)
2023	Honiara, Solomon Islands	61 kg	118	123	~~126~~	1st place, gold medalist(s)	~~155~~	~~155~~	~~155~~	—	—	—
