= Andrea Hams =

New Zealand weightlifter and hurdler

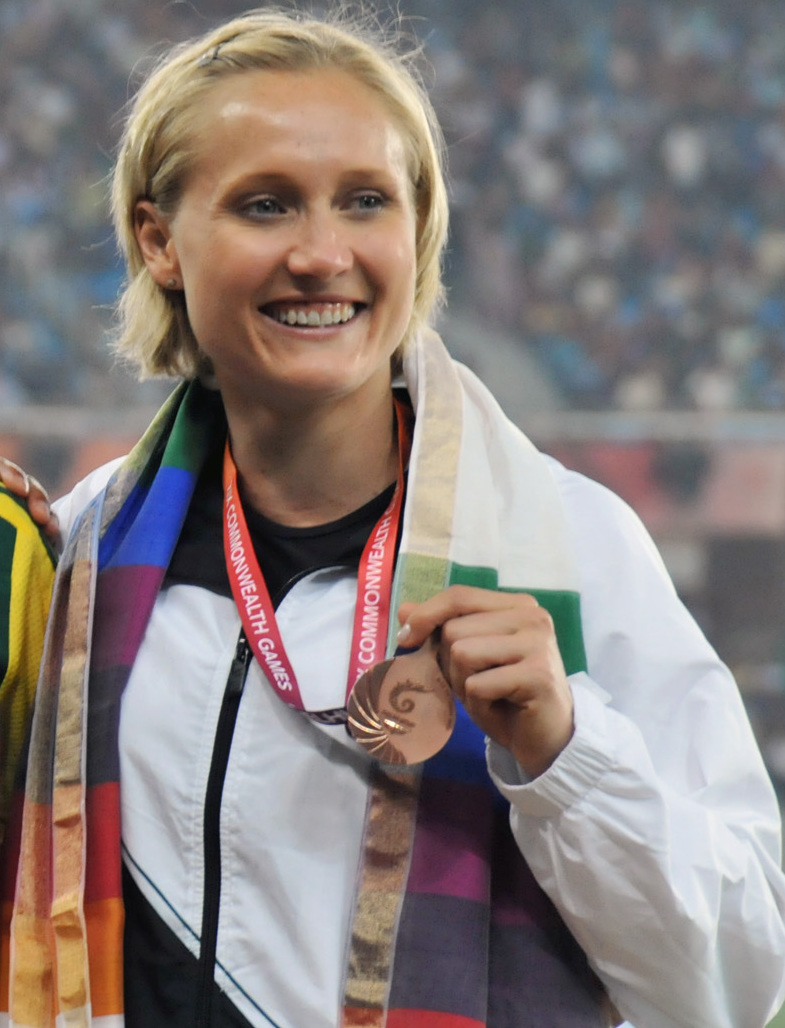

Personal information
- Born: Andrea Helen Miller; 13 March 1982 (age 44) Howick, New Zealand
- Spouse: Regan Hams

Sport
- Country: New Zealand
- Sport: Women's athletics and weightlifting

Achievements and titles
- National finals: 100 m hurdles champion (2002, 2006, 2007, 2008, 2012)
Medal record
Representing New Zealand
Women's athletics
Commonwealth Games
| Bronze medal – third place | 2010 Delhi | 100 m hurdles |
Summer Universiade
| Bronze medal – third place | 2009 Belgrade | 100 m hurdles |
Oceania Championships
| Gold medal – first place | 2010 Cairns | 100 m hurdles |
| Bronze medal – third place | 2010 Cairns | 4x100 m relay |
Oceania Youth Championships
| Gold medal – first place | 1997 Suva | 200 m |
| Gold medal – first place | 1997 Suva | 100 m hurdles |
| Gold medal – first place | 1997 Suva | Long jump |
| Silver medal – second place | 1997 Suva | 100 m |
Women's weightlifting
Oceania Championships
| Silver medal – second place | 2017 Gold Coast | 69 kg |
| Bronze medal – third place | 2014 Le Mont-Dore | 69 kg |
Australian International
| Gold medal – first place | 2017 Melbourne | 69 kg |
- Updated on 26 March 2018

Andrea Helen Hams (née Miller, born 13 March 1982) is a New Zealand representative weightlifter and former hurdler.

At the 2010 Commonwealth Games she won the bronze medal in the women's 100 m hurdles.

She was selected to compete in the sport of weightlifting (69 kg class) at the 2018 Commonwealth Games.

== Achievements in athletics ==
Representing New Zealand
| Year | Competition | Venue | Position | Event | Notes |
|---|---|---|---|---|---|
| 1997 | Oceania Youth Championships | Suva, Fiji | 2nd | 100 m | 12.20 |
| 1997 | Oceania Youth Championships | Suva, Fiji | 1st | 200 m | 25.30 |
| 1997 | Oceania Youth Championships | Suva, Fiji | 1st | 100 m hurdles | 14.76 |
| 1997 | Oceania Youth Championships | Suva, Fiji | 1st | Long jump | 5.56 m |
| 2000 | World Junior Championships | Santiago, Chile | 17th (h) | 100m hurdles | 13.77 (wind: -0.2 m/s) |
| 2000 | World Junior Championships | Santiago, Chile | 9th (h) | 4 × 100 m relay | 45.71 |
| 2009 | Summer Universiade | Belgrade, Serbia | 3rd | 100 m hurdles | 13.13 s |
| 2010 | Oceania Championships | Cairns, Australia | 1st | 100 m hurdles | 13.55 s CR |
| 2010 | Oceania Championships | Cairns, Australia | 3rd | 4 × 100 m relay | 48.33 s |
| 2010 | Commonwealth Games | Delhi, India | 3rd | 100 m hurdles | 13.25 s |

== Achievements in weightlifting ==
Representing New Zealand
| Year | Competition | Venue | Position | Notes |
|---|---|---|---|---|
| 2014 | Oceania Championships | Mont Dore, New Caledonia | 3rd | 69 kg |
| 2015 | World Championships | Houston, Texas | 34th | 69 kg |
| 2016 | Oceania Championships | Suva, Fiji | DNC | 63 kg |
| 2017 | Australian International | Melbourne, Australia | 1st | 69 kg |
| 2017 | Oceania Championships | Gold Coast, Australia | 2nd | 69 kg |
| 2017 | Commonwealth Championships | Gold Coast, Australia | 5th | 69 kg |
| 2018 | Commonwealth Games | Gold Coast, Australia | 6th | 69 kg |

Source: MILLER Andrea Helen NZL at iwf.net
