= Elson Brechtefeld =

Nauruan weightlifter

Personal information
- Born: 2 March 1994 (age 32) Nauru
- Height: 1.55 m (5 ft 1 in)
- Weight: 56 kg (123 lb)

Sport
- Country: Nauru
- Sport: Weightlifting
Medal record
Men's weightlifting
Representing Nauru
Pacific Games
Gold medal – first place	2019 Apia	55 kg
Silver medal – second place	2015 Port Moresby	56 kg
Bronze medal – third place	2011 Nouméa	56 kg
Commonwealth Championships
Silver medal – second place	2012 Apia	56 kg
Silver medal – second place	2019 Apia	55 kg
Bronze medal – third place	2011 Cape Town	56 kg
Oceania Championships
Gold medal – first place	2013 Brisbane	69 kg
Gold medal – first place	2019 Apia	55 kg
Silver medal – second place	2011 Darwin	56 kg
Silver medal – second place	2012 Apia	56 kg
Silver medal – second place	2015 Port Moresby	56 kg
Silver medal – second place	2016 Suva	56 kg
Silver medal – second place	2017 Gold Coast	56 kg
Silver medal – second place	2018 Le Mont-Dore	62 kg
Bronze medal – third place	2010 Suva	56 kg
Arafura Games
Silver medal – second place	2011 Darwin	56 kg

Elson Viney-Bartel Brechtefeld (born 2 March 1994) is a Nauruan weightlifter who won a bronze medal in the 69 kg category at the 2013 Pacific Mini Games. He moved down to the 62 kg division in the following year, placing 13th at the 2014 Commonwealth Games, and later competed in the 56 kg category, qualifying for the 2016 Summer Olympics.

At the 2016 Summer Olympics in Rio de Janeiro, he finished in 15th place in the 56 kg category. He was the flagbearer for Nauru during the Parade of Nations.
