= Steven Kari =

Papua New Guinean weightlifter

Personal information
- Full name: Steven Kukuna Kari
- Nationality: Papua New Guinea
- Born: May 13, 1993 (age 33) Port Moresby, Papua New Guinea
- Height: 1.67 m (5 ft 5 1/2 in)
- Weight: 85 kg (187 lb)

Sport
- Sport: Weightlifting
- Event(s): -77kg, -85 kg, -94kg
Medal record
Men's weightlifting
Representing Papua New Guinea
Commonwealth Games
Gold medal – first place	2014 Glasgow	94 kg
Gold medal – first place	2018 Gold Coast	94 kg
Pacific Games
Gold medal – first place	2011 Nouméa	85 kg
Gold medal – first place	2015 Port Moresby	94 kg
Gold medal – first place	2019 Apia	96 kg
Commonwealth Championships
Gold medal – first place	2011 Cape Town	85 kg
Gold medal – first place	2013 Penang	94 kg
Gold medal – first place	2017 Gold Coast	94 kg
Gold medal – first place	2019 Apia	96 kg
Silver medal – second place	2012 Apia	85 kg
Oceania Championships
Gold medal – first place	2011 Darwin	85 kg
Gold medal – first place	2013 Brisbane	94 kg
Gold medal – first place	2014 Le Mont-Dore	94 kg
Gold medal – first place	2015 Port Moresby	94 kg
Gold medal – first place	2017 Gold Coast	94 kg
Gold medal – first place	2018 Le Mont-Dore	94 kg
Gold medal – first place	2019 Apia	96 kg
Silver medal – second place	2010 Suva	69 kg
Silver medal – second place	2012 Apia	85 kg
Bronze medal – third place	2008 Auckland	62 kg
Bronze medal – third place	2025 Meyuns	+110 kg
Arafura Games
Gold medal – first place	2011 Darwin	85 kg
Gold medal – first place	2019 Darwin	96 kg

Steven Kakuna Kari (born 13 May 1993 in Port Moresby) is a Papua New Guinean weightlifter competing in the men's 85 kg and later 94 kg category.

== 85kg ==
The youngest member of the Papua New Guinea team, he finished 15th at the 2012 Summer Olympics. Kari won the gold medal at the 2011 Pacific Games.

== 94kg ==
Kari won gold at the 2014 Commonwealth Games in the Men's 94 kg class.
