= 2017 Oceania Weightlifting Championships =

International weightlifting competition

- Host city: Gold Coast, Australia
- Dates: September 4 – 9
- Main venue: Gold Coast Sports and Leisure Centre

The 2017 Oceania Weightlifting Championships were held in Gold Coast, Australia between 4 and 9 September 2017. The competition was part of the Commonwealth Championships – the test event for the 2018 Commonwealth Games weightlifting competition.

== Medal summary ==
Results shown below are for the senior competition only. Junior and youth results are cited here and here respectively.

=== Men ===
Event	Gold		Silver		Bronze	
56 kg
Snatch	Manueli Tulo; Fiji	107 kg	Elson Brechtefield; Nauru	103 kg	Shadrach Cain; Nauru	80 kg
Clean & Jerk	Manueli Tulo; Fiji	135 kg	Elson Brechtefield; Nauru	130 kg	Shadrach Cain; Nauru	105 kg
Total	Manueli Tulo; Fiji	242 kg	Elson Brechtefield; Nauru	233 kg	Shadrach Cain; Nauru	185 kg
62 kg
Snatch	Morea Baru; Papua New Guinea	120 kg	Ianne Guiñares; New Zealand	109 kg	Poama Qaqa; Fiji	109 kg
Clean & Jerk	Morea Baru; Papua New Guinea	162 kg	Ianne Guiñares; New Zealand	144 kg	Poama Qaqa; Fiji	135 kg
Total	Morea Baru; Papua New Guinea	282 kg	Ianne Guiñares; New Zealand	253 kg	Poama Qaqa; Fiji	244 kg
69 kg
Snatch	Vaipava Ioane; Samoa	126 kg	Brandon Wakeling; Australia	125 kg	Vester Villalon; New Zealand	120 kg
Clean & Jerk	Vaipava Ioane; Samoa	170 kg	Vester Villalon; New Zealand	159 kg	Brandon Wakeling; Australia	159 kg
Total	Vaipava Ioane; Samoa	296 kg	Brandon Wakeling; Australia	284 kg	Vester Villalon; New Zealand	279 kg
77 kg
Snatch	Cameron McTaggart; New Zealand	133 kg	Taretiita Baraniko Tabaroua; Kiribati	130 kg	Frank Elliott; Australia	130 kg
Clean & Jerk	Taretiita Baraniko Tabaroua; Kiribati	173 kg	Toua Udia; Papua New Guinea	167 kg	Cameron McTaggart; New Zealand	158 kg
Total	Taretiita Baraniko Tabaroua; Kiribati	303 kg	Toua Udia; Papua New Guinea	292 kg	Cameron McTaggart; New Zealand	291 kg
85 kg
Snatch	Don Opeloge; Samoa	146 kg	Richard Patterson; New Zealand	140 kg	Troy Hewkins; Australia	135 kg
Clean & Jerk	Don Opeloge; Samoa	186 kg	Richard Patterson; New Zealand	166 kg	Tom-Jaye Waibeiya; Nauru	165 kg
Total	Don Opeloge; Samoa	332 kg	Richard Patterson; New Zealand	306 kg	Taniela Rainibogi; Fiji	298 kg
94 kg
Snatch	Steven Kari; Papua New Guinea	152 kg	Siaosi Leuo; Samoa	150 kg	Koriata Petelo; Samoa	146 kg
Clean & Jerk	Steven Kari; Papua New Guinea	200 kg	Siaosi Leuo; Samoa	191 kg	Koriata Petelo; Samoa	187 kg
Total	Steven Kari; Papua New Guinea	352 kg	Siaosi Leuo; Samoa	341 kg	Koriata Petelo; Samoa	333 kg
105 kg
Snatch	Stanislav Chalaev; New Zealand	148 kg	Tanumafili Jungblut; American Samoa	148 kg	Sanele Mao; Samoa	146 kg
Clean & Jerk	Sanele Mao; Samoa	195 kg	Tanumafili Jungblut; American Samoa	183 kg	Stanislav Chalaev; New Zealand	179 kg
Total	Sanele Mao; Samoa	341 kg	Tanumafili Jungblut; American Samoa	331 kg	Stanislav Chalaev; New Zealand	327 kg
+105 kg
Snatch	Lauititi Lui; Samoa	173 kg	Damon Kelly; Australia	158 kg	Itte Detenamo; Nauru	150 kg
Clean & Jerk	Lauititi Lui; Samoa	222 kg	Aisake Tuitupou; New Zealand	190 kg	Damon Kelly; Australia	187 kg
Total	Lauititi Lui; Samoa	395 kg	Damon Kelly; Australia	345 kg	Aisake Tuitupou; New Zealand	333 kg

=== Women ===
Event	Gold		Silver		Bronze	
48 kg
Snatch	Tegan Napper; Australia	70 kg	Thelma Toua; Papua New Guinea	68 kg	Charlotte Moss; New Zealand	61 kg
Clean & Jerk	Tegan Napper; Australia	88 kg	Thelma Toua; Papua New Guinea	85 kg	Alyce Stephenson; Australia	80 kg
Total	Tegan Napper; Australia	158 kg	Thelma Toua; Papua New Guinea	153 kg	Alyce Stephenson; Australia	138 kg
53 kg
Snatch	Dika Toua; Papua New Guinea	81 kg	Phillipa Patterson; New Zealand	74 kg	Mary Kini Lifu; Solomon Islands	68 kg
Clean & Jerk	Dika Toua; Papua New Guinea	104 kg	Phillipa Patterson; New Zealand	93 kg	Mary Kini Lifu; Solomon Islands	88 kg
Total	Dika Toua; Papua New Guinea	185 kg	Phillipa Patterson; New Zealand	167 kg	Mary Kini Lifu; Solomon Islands	156 kg
58 kg
Snatch	Jenly Tegu Wini; Solomon Islands	87 kg	Alethea Boon; New Zealand	80 kg	Parisa Haeri Jaobi; Australia	72 kg
Clean & Jerk	Jenly Tegu Wini; Solomon Islands	109 kg	Alethea Boon; New Zealand	96 kg	Parisa Haeri Jaobi; Australia	92 kg
Total	Jenly Tegu Wini; Solomon Islands	196 kg	Alethea Boon; New Zealand	176 kg	Parisa Haeri Jaobi; Australia	164 kg
63 kg
Snatch	Mathlynn Sasser; Marshall Islands	90 kg	Sabah Chamoun; Australia	78 kg	Maximina Uepa; Nauru	69 kg
Clean & Jerk	Mathlynn Sasser; Marshall Islands	115 kg	Sabah Chamoun; Australia	98 kg	Maximina Uepa; Nauru	95 kg
Total	Mathlynn Sasser; Marshall Islands	205 kg	Sabah Chamoun; Australia	176 kg	Maximina Uepa; Nauru	164 kg
69 kg
Snatch	Apolonia Vaivai; Fiji	101 kg	Andrea Miller; New Zealand	89 kg	Jessica Lai; Australia	88 kg
Clean & Jerk	Apolonia Vaivai; Fiji	126 kg	Andrea Miller; New Zealand	107 kg	Jessica Lai; Australia}	104 kg
Total	Apolonia Vaivai; Fiji	227 kg	Andrea Miller; New Zealand	196 kg	Jessica Lai; Australia	192 kg
75 kg
Snatch	Bailey Rogers; New Zealand	90 kg	Camilla Fogagnolo; Australia	87 kg	Kylie Lindbeck; Australia	86 kg
Clean & Jerk	Bailey Rogers; New Zealand	109 kg	Camilla Fogagnolo; Australia	107 kg	Kylie Lindbeck; Australia	100 kg
Total	Bailey Rogers; New Zealand	199 kg	Camilla Fogagnolo; Australia	194 kg	Kylie Lindbeck; Australia	186 kg
90 kg
Snatch	Eileen Cikamatana; Fiji	102 kg	Tracey Lambrechs; New Zealand	95 kg	Lorraine Harry; Papua New Guinea	85 kg
Clean & Jerk	Eileen Cikamatana; Fiji	141 kg	Tracey Lambrechs; New Zealand	124 kg	Lorraine Harry; Papua New Guinea	111 kg
Total	Eileen Cikamatana; Fiji	243 kg	Tracey Lambrechs; New Zealand	219 kg	Lorraine Harry; Papua New Guinea	196 kg
+90 kg
Snatch	Laurel Hubbard; New Zealand	127 kg	Iuniarra Sipaia; Samoa	108 kg	Feagaiga Stowers; Samoa	107 kg
Clean & Jerk	Laurel Hubbard; New Zealand	146 kg	Iuniarra Sipaia; Samoa	142 kg	Feagaiga Stowers; Samoa	136 kg
Total	Laurel Hubbard; New Zealand	273 kg	Iuniarra Sipaia; Samoa	250 kg	Feagaiga Stowers; Samoa	243 kg

== Medal table ==
Ranking by Big (Total result) medals

* Host nation (Australia)

Rank	Nation	Gold	Silver	Bronze	Total
1	Samoa	4	2	2	8
2	Papua New Guinea	3	2	1	6
3	Fiji	3	0	2	5
4	New Zealand	2	6	4	12
5	Australia*	1	4	4	9
6	Solomon Islands	1	0	1	2
7	Kiribati	1	0	0	1
7	Marshall Islands	1	0	0	1
9	Nauru	0	1	2	3
10	American Samoa	0	1	0	1
Totals (10 entries)		16	16	16	48
