= Alethea Boon =

New Zealand artistic gymnast (born 1984)

Personal information
- Nationality: Fijian New Zealander
- Born: 7 January 1984 (age 42) Suva, Fiji

Sport
- Country: New Zealand
- Sport: Artistic gymnastics, weightlifting and CrossFit
Medal record
Women's weightlifting
Representing New Zealand
Oceania Championships
Silver medal – second place	2017 Gold Coast	58 kg
Bronze medal – third place	2016 Suva	63 kg

Alethea Boon (born 7 January 1984) is an athlete from New Zealand. She represented New Zealand in artistic gymnastics at the 1998 Commonwealth Games and the 2002 Commonwealth Games, and in weightlifting at the 2018 Commonwealth Games.

Boon was born in Suva, Fiji, and grew up in Auckland, New Zealand. She competed in artistic gymnastics, attending two Commonwealth Games, and studied exercise science at Brigham Young University while continuing to compete while at university. She retired at the age of 24.

In 2010, Boon suffered a blockage in the arteries of her lungs after surgery and she was initially unable to walk due to lack of breath. She began to compete in CrossFit, participating at the 2016 and 2017 Crossfit Games, and in 2013 she began competing in Olympic-style weightlifting. She achieved two 2nd-place finishes in the Australian Weightlifting Open, and the 2017 Oceania Weightlifting Championships. In 2018, she competed in the Women's 58 kg event at the Commonwealth Games on the Gold Coast.

== CrossFit Games results ==
Year	Games	Regionals	Open (Worldwide)
2014 (Individual)	—	DNP	149th
2014 (Team)	6th	2nd (Australia)	149th
2015	20th	2nd (Pacific)	154th
2016	40th	3rd (Pacific)	38th
2017	21st	3rd (Pacific)	196th
2018	—	—	29951st (Note: Injured during Open and had to sit out the season.)
Year	Games	Qualifier	Open
2019	5th (Masters 35–39)	3rd (Asia); 2nd (Masters 35–39 qualifier)	149th (world); 11th (New Zealand); 10th (Masters 35–39)
2020			65th (world); 5th (New Zealand); 4th (Masters 35–39)
