= Phillipa Patterson =

New Zealand weightlifter

Personal information
- Nationality: New Zealand
- Born: 8 December 1984 (age 41) Auckland, New Zealand

Sport
- Sport: Weightlifting
Medal record
Women's weightlifting
Representing New Zealand
Commonwealth Championships
Bronze medal – third place	2016 Penang	53 kg
Oceania Championships
Gold medal – first place	2016 Suva	53 kg
Silver medal – second place	2013 Brisbane	53 kg
Silver medal – second place	2014 Le Mont-Dore	53 kg
Silver medal – second place	2017 Gold Coast	53 kg
Bronze medal – third place	2012 Apia	53 kg

Phillipa Jean "Pip" Patterson (née Hale, born 8 December 1984) is a weightlifter from New Zealand.

Patterson was a gymnast from the age of five to 14, before changing to crossfit and weightlifting. She competed in the 2014 Commonwealth Games, finishing fifth in the women's under 53 kg weight category. She also competed in the 2018 Commonwealth Games.

She won gold at the 2016 Oceania Weightlifting Championships, bronze in at the 2016 Commonwealth Championships and silver in the 2017 Oceania Weightlifting Championships. In 2017 she was named New Zealand's top female weightlifter.
