= Mary Kini Lifu =

Solomon Islands weightlifter (born 1994)

Mary Lifu
Personal information
- Full name: Mary Kini Lifu
- Nationality: Solomon Islands
- Born: 15 October 1994 (age 31) Honiara, Solomon Islands
- Height: 1.49 m (4 ft 10 1/2 in)
- Weight: 53 kg (117 lb)

Sport
- Sport: Weightlifting
- Event: -53 kg
Medal record
Women's weightlifting
Representing Solomon Islands
Pacific Games
Gold medal – first place	2019 Apia	55 kg
Silver medal – second place	2015 Port Moresby	53 kg
Oceania Championships
Gold medal – first place	2019 Apia	55 kg
Silver medal – second place	2015 Port Moresby	53 kg
Silver medal – second place	2017 Gold Coast	53 kg
Silver medal – second place	2016 Suva	53 kg
Silver medal – second place	2021	59 kg
Bronze medal – third place	2017 Gold Coast	53 kg

Mary Kini Lifu (born 15 October 1994 in Honiara, Solomon Islands) is a Solomon Islander weightlifter. She competed at the 2020 Summer Olympics in the women's 55 kg event.

== Career ==
She won a silver medal at the 2015 Pacific Games in the 53 kg category.

In 2018 she competed at the 2018 Commonwealth Games, finishing ninth in the women's 53 kg event.

In 2019 she won the gold medal at the 2019 Pacific Games in 55 kg category.

== Major results ==
Year	Venue	Weight	Snatch (kg)					Clean & Jerk (kg)					Total	Rank
Year	Venue	Weight	1	2	3	Result	Rank	1	2	3	Result	Rank	Total	Rank
Representing Solomon Islands
Olympic Games
2021	Tokyo, Japan	55 kg	64	~~67~~	67	67	14	84	87	~~90~~	87	14	154	14
World Championships
2019	Pattaya, Thailand	55 kg	70	74	77	77	32	~~85~~	85	~~89~~	85	37	162	36
Oceania Championships
2019	Apia, Samoa	55 kg	70	73	~~75~~	73	1st place, gold medalist(s)	86	89	~~92~~	89	1st place, gold medalist(s)	162	1st place, gold medalist(s)
2018	Mont-Dore, New Caledonia	53 kg	65	70	74	74	1st place, gold medalist(s)	85	~~89~~	89	89	2nd place, silver medalist(s)	163	2nd place, silver medalist(s)
2017	Gold Coast, Australia	53 kg	68	~~72~~	~~72~~	68	3rd place, bronze medalist(s)	~~88~~	88	~~92~~	88	3rd place, bronze medalist(s)	156	3rd place, bronze medalist(s)
2016	Suva, Fiji	53 kg	~~65~~	65	~~72~~	65	2nd place, silver medalist(s)	~~85~~	85	~~90~~	85	2nd place, silver medalist(s)	150	2nd place, silver medalist(s)
2015	Port Moresby, Papua New Guinea	53 kg	62	63	~~67~~	63	2nd place, silver medalist(s)	78	~~85~~	85	85	3rd place, bronze medalist(s)	148	2nd place, silver medalist(s)
Commonwealth Games
2018	Gold Coast, Australia	53 kg	65	70	73	73	10	85	90	93	93	9	166	9
Pacific Games
2019	Apia, Samoa	55 kg	70	73	~~75~~	73	1st place, gold medalist(s)	86	89	~~92~~	89	1st place, gold medalist(s)	162	1st place, gold medalist(s)
2015	Port Moresby, Papua New Guinea	53 kg	62	63	~~67~~	63	2nd place, silver medalist(s)	78	~~85~~	85	85	3rd place, bronze medalist(s)	148	2nd place, silver medalist(s)
