= Mark Spooner =

New Zealand weightlifter (born 1984)

Personal information
- Born: 12 December 1984 (age 41) Auckland, New Zealand
- Height: 1.60 m (5 ft 3 in)
- Weight: 69 kg (152 lb)

Sport
- Country: New Zealand
- Sport: Weightlifting
- Event: 69 kg

Mark Spooner (born 12 December 1984 in Auckland) is a New Zealand weightlifter. Spooner represented New Zealand at the 2008 Summer Olympics in Beijing, where he competed for the men's lightweight category (69 kg). Spooner placed 21st in this event, as he successfully lifted 123 kg in the single-motion snatch, and hoisted 158 kg in the two-part, shoulder-to-overhead clean and jerk, for a total of 281 kg.
