= 2016 Oceania Weightlifting Championships =

International weightlifting competition

- Host city: Suva, Fiji
- Dates: May 24 – 28
- Main venue: Vodafone Arena, Fiji

The 2016 Oceania Weightlifting Championships was held in Suva, Fiji between May 24 and May 28, 2016.

== Medal summary ==
Results shown below are for the senior competition only. Junior and youth results are cited here and here respectively.

=== Men ===
Event	Gold		Silver		Bronze	
56 kg
Snatch	Manueli Tulo; Fiji	104 kg	Elson Brechtefield; Nauru	100 kg	Poama Qaqa; Fiji	87 kg
Clean & Jerk	Manueli Tulo; Fiji	127 kg	Elson Brechtefield; Nauru	125 kg	Poama Qaqa; Fiji	110 kg
Total	Manueli Tulo; Fiji	231 kg	Elson Brechtefield; Nauru	225 kg	Poama Qaqa; Fiji	197 kg
62 kg
Snatch	Morea Baru; Papua New Guinea	120 kg	Vaipava Nevo Ioane; Samoa	120 kg	Isikeli Dau; Fiji	95 kg
Clean & Jerk	Morea Baru; Papua New Guinea	163 kg	Vaipava Nevo Ioane; Samoa	163 kg	Isikeli Dau; Fiji	120 kg
Total	Morea Baru; Papua New Guinea	283 kg	Vaipava Nevo Ioane; Samoa	283 kg	Isikeli Dau; Fiji	215 kg
69 kg
Snatch	Manuel Minginfel; Federated States of Micronesia	120 kg	Fred Oala; Papua New Guinea	120 kg	Vester Louie Villalon; New Zealand	113 kg
Clean & Jerk	Fred Oala; Papua New Guinea	158 kg	Manuel Minginfel; Federated States of Micronesia	150 kg	Vester Louie Villalon; New Zealand	144 kg
Total	Fred Oala; Papua New Guinea	278 kg	Manuel Minginfel; Federated States of Micronesia	270 kg	Vester Louie Villalon; New Zealand	257 kg
77 kg
Snatch	Francois Etoundi; Australia	135 kg	Frank Donald Elliott; Australia	131 kg	Toafitu Perive; Samoa	127 kg
Clean & Jerk	Taretiita Baraniko Tabaroua; Kiribati	165 kg	Toafitu Perive; Samoa	163 kg	Francois Etoundi; Australia	156 kg
Total	Francois Etoundi; Australia	291 kg	Taretiita Baraniko Tabaroua; Kiribati	290 kg	Toafitu Perive; Samoa	290 kg
85 kg
Snatch	Richard Patterson; New Zealand	150 kg	Malek Chamoun; Australia	140 kg	Mitchell Delbridge; Australia	137 kg
Clean & Jerk	Petunu Opeloge; Samoa	182 kg	Richard Patterson; New Zealand	180 kg	Malek Chamoun; Australia	170 kg
Total	Richard Patterson; New Zealand	330 kg	Petunu Opeloge; Samoa	318 kg	Malek Chamoun; Australia	310 kg
94 kg
Snatch	Siaosi Leuo; Samoa	150 kg	Simplice Ribouem; Australia	150 kg	Tanumafili Malietoa Jungblut; American Samoa	143 kg
Clean & Jerk	Siaosi Leuo; Samoa	186 kg	Simplice Ribouem; Australia	185 kg	Koriata Petelo; Samoa	178 kg
Total	Siaosi Leuo; Samoa	336 kg	Simplice Ribouem; Australia	335 kg	Koriata Petelo; Samoa	318 kg
105 kg
Snatch	David Katoatau; Kiribati	148 kg	Sanele Mao; Samoa	145 kg	Rory Phillip Taylor; New Zealand	139 kg
Clean & Jerk	David Katoatau; Kiribati	201 kg	Sanele Mao; Samoa	190 kg	Rory Phillip Taylor; New Zealand	180 kg
Total	David Katoatau; Kiribati	349 kg	Sanele Mao; Samoa	335 kg	Rory Phillip Taylor; New Zealand	319 kg
+105 kg
Snatch	Damon Kelly; Australia	168 kg	Itte Detenamo; Nauru	168 kg	Lauititi Lui; Samoa	167 kg
Clean & Jerk	Itte Detenamo; Nauru	208 kg	David Liti; New Zealand	206 kg	Damon Kelly; Australia	205 kg
Total	Itte Detenamo; Nauru	376 kg	Damon Kelly; Australia	373 kg	Lauititi Lui; Samoa	368 kg

=== Women ===
Event	Gold		Silver		Bronze	
48 kg
Snatch	Erika Yamasaki; Australia	71 kg	Thelma Toua; Papua New Guinea	70 kg	Seruwaia Malani; Fiji	59 kg
Clean & Jerk	Erika Yamasaki; Australia	88 kg	Thelma Toua; Papua New Guinea	80 kg	Seruwaia Malani; Fiji	74 kg
Total	Erika Yamasaki; Australia	159 kg	Thelma Toua; Papua New Guinea	150 kg	Seruwaia Malani; Fiji	133 kg
53 kg
Snatch	Phillipa Patterson; New Zealand	73 kg	Mary Kini Lifu; Solomon Islands	65 kg	Ulina Tinaiadivila Sagone; Fiji	62 kg
Clean & Jerk	Phillipa Patterson; New Zealand	89 kg	Mary Kini Lifu; Solomon Islands	85 kg	Louise Charlotte Moss; New Zealand	78 kg
Total	Phillipa Patterson; New Zealand	162 kg	Mary Kini Lifu; Solomon Islands	150 kg	Louise Charlotte Moss; New Zealand	140 kg
58 kg
Snatch	Jenly Tegu Wini; Solomon Islands	87 kg	Mathlynn Sasser; Marshall Islands	85 kg	Tia-Clair Toomey; Australia	85 kg
Clean & Jerk	Mathlynn Sasser; Marshall Islands	114 kg	Tia-Clair Toomey; Australia	109 kg	Jenly Tegu Wini; Solomon Islands	108 kg
Total	Mathlynn Sasser; Marshall Islands	199 kg	Jenly Tegu Wini; Solomon Islands	195 kg	Tia-Clair Toomey; Australia	194 kg
63 kg
Snatch	Kiana Elliott; Australia	93 kg	Andrea Hams; New Zealand	93 kg	Philippa Kate Malone; Australia	86 kg
Clean & Jerk	Kiana Elliott; Australia	107 kg	Philippa Kate Malone; Australia	105 kg	Alethea Boon; New Zealand	95 kg
Total	Kiana Elliott; Australia	200 kg	Philippa Kate Malone; Australia	191 kg	Alethea Boon; New Zealand	176 kg
69 kg
Snatch	Eileen Cikamatana; Fiji	93 kg	Apolonia Vaivai; Fiji	92 kg	Amanda Kate Gould; New Zealand	77 kg
Clean & Jerk	Apolonia Vaivai; Fiji	114 kg	Eileen Cikamatana; Fiji	112 kg	Amanda Kate Gould; New Zealand	91 kg
Total	Apolonia Vaivai; Fiji	206 kg	Eileen Cikamatana; Fiji	205 kg	Amanda Kate Gould; New Zealand	168 kg
75 kg
Snatch	Mary Opeloge; Samoa	103 kg	Jenna Anne Myers; Australia	93 kg	Bailey Morgan Rogers; New Zealand	86 kg
Clean & Jerk	Mary Opeloge; Samoa	122 kg	Jenna Anne Myers; Australia	115 kg	Camilla Fogagnolo; Australia	111 kg
Total	Mary Opeloge; Samoa	225 kg	Jenna Anne Myers; Australia	208 kg	Camilla Fogagnolo; Australia	196 kg
+75 kg
Snatch	Iuniarra Sipaia; Samoa	107 kg	Tracey Lambrechs; New Zealand	102 kg	Luisa Peters; Cook Islands	95 kg
Clean & Jerk	Iuniarra Sipaia; Samoa	139 kg	Tracey Lambrechs; New Zealand	138 kg	Luisa Peters; Cook Islands	117 kg
Total	Iuniarra Sipaia; Samoa	246 kg	Tracey Lambrechs; New Zealand	240 kg	Luisa Peters; Cook Islands	212 kg

=== Medal table ===
Ranking by Big (Total result) medals

* Host nation (Fiji)

Rank	Nation	Gold	Silver	Bronze	Total
1	Australia	3	4	3	10
2	Samoa	3	3	3	9
3	New Zealand	2	1	5	8
4	Fiji*	2	1	3	6
5	Papua New Guinea	2	1	0	3
6	Kiribati	1	1	0	2
6	Nauru	1	1	0	2
8	Marshall Islands	1	0	0	1
9	Solomon Islands	0	2	0	2
10	Federated States of Micronesia	0	1	0	1
11	Cook Islands	0	0	1	1
Totals (11 entries)		15	15	15	45

== Participating nations ==
- American Samoa (6)
- Australia (17)
- Cook Islands (3)
- Fiji (24)
- Federated States of Micronesia (1)
- Guam (1)
- Kiribati (6)
- Marshall Islands (2)
- New Caledonia (2)
- Niue (2)
- Nauru (17)
- New Zealand (36)
- Palau (1)
- Papua New Guinea (3)
- Samoa (15)
- Solomon Islands (8)
- Tonga (1)
- Tuvalu (8)
