= Ianne Guiñares =

New Zealand weightlifter

Ianne Ernesto Vergara Guinares
Personal information
- Full name: Ianne Ernesto Vergara Pleños Guiñares
- Nationality: New Zealander
- Born: 12 January 1988 (age 38) Bomedco Medellin, Cebu, Philippines
- Years active: 12 years
- Height: 1.57 m (5 ft 2 in)
- Weight: 62 kg (137 lb)
- Website: www.ianneguinares.com

Sport
- Country: New Zealand
- Sport: Weightlifting
- Weight class: 62kg
- Team: New Zealand National team
- Retired: Retired

Achievements and titles
- Personal best(s): 120kg Snatch & 150kg Clean and Jerk
Medal record
Men's weightlifting
Representing New Zealand
Oceania Championships
Silver medal – second place	2017 Gold Coast	62 kg
Bronze medal – third place	2012 Apia	62 kg
Bronze medal – third place	2013 Brisbane	62 kg
Bronze medal – third place	2014 Le Mont-Dore	62 kg
- Updated on 28 January 2022

Ianne Ernesto Vergara Guinares (born 12 January 1988) is a New Zealand male weightlifter, competing in the 62 kg category and representing New Zealand at international competitions. He competed at 2014 Glasgow Commonwealth Games, 2018 Gold Coast Commonwealth Games and world championships, including at the 2015 World Weightlifting Championships. Ianne now lives in the Netherlands where he works as a CrossFit- and Weightlifting coach.

== Major results ==
Year	Venue	Weight	Snatch (kg)				Clean & Jerk (kg)				Total	Rank
Year	Venue	Weight	1	2	3	Rank	1	2	3	Rank	Total	Rank
World Championships
2015	Houston, United States	62 kg	108	~~111~~	~~111~~	41	~~136~~	~~136~~	136	41	244	41
