= Saxon Gregory-Hunt =

New Zealand weightlifter

Personal information
- Full name: Saxon Gregory-Hunt
- Born: 11 May 1993 (age 33)
- Weight: 84.37 kg (186.0 lb)

Sport
- Country: New Zealand
- Sport: Weightlifting
- Weight class: 85 kg
- Team: National team
- Updated on 19 October 2016

Saxon Gregory-Hunt (born 11 May 1993) is a New Zealand male weightlifter, competing in the 85 kg category and representing New Zealand at international competitions. He participated at the 2014 Commonwealth Games in the 85 kg event.

== Major competitions ==
Year	Venue	Weight	Snatch (kg)				Clean & Jerk (kg)				Total	Rank
Year	Venue	Weight	1	2	3	Rank	1	2	3	Rank	Total	Rank
Commonwealth Games
2014	Glasgow, Scotland	85 kg	130	~~134~~	~~134~~	—N/a	160	165	~~169~~	—N/a	295	9
