= Rick Yves Confiance =

Seychellois weightlifter (born 1994)

Personal information
- Born: May 24, 1994 (age 31)

Sport
- Country: Seychelles
- Sport: Weightlifting

Rick Yves Confiance (born May 24, 1994) is a Seychellois weightlifter. He placed 13th in the men's 62 kg event at the 2016 Summer Olympics.
