= Lou Guinares =

New Zealand weightlifter

Personal information
- Full name: Lou Guinares
- Born: 18 March 1990 (age 36)
- Weight: 55.46 kg (122.3 lb)

Sport
- Country: New Zealand
- Sport: Weightlifting
- Weight class: 56 kg
- Team: National team
- Updated on 11 October 2016

Lou Guinares (born 18 March 1990) is a New Zealand male weightlifter, competing in the 56 kg category and representing New Zealand at international competitions. He participated at the 2010 Commonwealth Games in the 56 kg event and at the 2014 Commonwealth Games in the 56 kg event.

== Major competitions ==
Year	Venue	Weight	Snatch (kg)				Clean & Jerk (kg)				Total	Rank
Year	Venue	Weight	1	2	3	Rank	1	2	3	Rank	Total	Rank
Commonwealth Games
2014	Glasgow, Scotland	56 kg	90	~~93~~	~~93~~	—N/a	113	116	~~119~~	—N/a	206	7
2010	Delhi, India	56 kg	90	~~94~~	94	—N/a	~~120~~	120	124	—N/a	218	7
