= Jenly Tegu Wini =

Solomon Islands weightlifter (born 1983)

Personal information
- Nationality: Solomon Islands
- Born: 9 June 1983 (age 43) Honiara, Solomon Islands
- Height: 1.55 m (5 ft 1 in)
- Weight: 58 kg (128 lb)

Sport
- Sport: Weightlifting
- Event: -58 kg
- Coached by: Leslie Ata
Medal record
Women's weightlifting
Representing Solomon Islands
Pacific Games
Gold medal – first place	2015 Port Moresby	58 kg
Silver medal – second place	2019 Apia	59 kg
Silver medal – second place	2011 Nouméa	58 kg
Commonwealth Games
Bronze medal – third place	2018 Gold Coast	58 kg
Commonwealth Championships
Gold medal – first place	2015 Pune	58 kg
Gold medal – first place	2017 Gold Coast	58 kg
Bronze medal – third place	2012 Apia	58 kg
Oceania Championships
Gold medal – first place	2013 Brisbane	58 kg
Gold medal – first place	2014 Le Mont-Dore	58 kg
Gold medal – first place	2015 Port Moresby	58 kg
Gold medal – first place	2017 Gold Coast	58 kg
Gold medal – first place	2018 Le Mont-Dore	58 kg
Gold medal – first place	2021	55 kg
Gold medal – first place	2026 Apia	53 kg
Silver medal – second place	2012 Apia	58 kg
Silver medal – second place	2016 Suva	58 kg
Silver medal – second place	2019 Apia	59 kg

Jenly Tegu Wini (born 9 June 1983 in Honiara, Solomon Islands) is Solomon Islander weightlifter. She competed in the 2012 Summer Olympics in the women's 58 kg category. She was the flagbearer of the Solomon Islands sports team in the opening ceremony. In the event, Wini finished in the 17th place.

She won the 2013 Oceania Championships in her weight category, becoming the first female weightlifter from Solomon Islands to achieve this feat.

She also competed at the 2014 Commonwealth Games, finishing 8th in the women's 58 kg event. She was also the Solomon Islands flagbearer at this event.

She competed at the 2016 Summer Olympics in Rio de Janeiro in the women's 58 kg. She finished in 15th place. She was the flagbearer for the Solomon Islands during the opening ceremony.

In 2018, she made history by becoming the first Solomon Islands athlete to win a Commonwealth Games medal, claiming bronze in the women's 58kg weightlifting event on the Gold Coast.

== Major results ==
Year	Venue	Weight	Snatch (kg)					Clean & Jerk (kg)					Total	Rank
Year	Venue	Weight	1	2	3	Result	Rank	1	2	3	Result	Rank	Total	Rank
Representing Solomon Islands
Olympic Games
2016	Rio de Janeiro, Brazil	58 kg	80	84	~~87~~	84	13	100	104	~~109~~	104	14	188	15
2012	(United Kingdom) London, Great Britain	58 kg	65	~~69~~	~~69~~	65	17	90	93	95	95	15	160	15
World Championships
2023	Riyadh, Saudi Arabia	55 kg	75	80	84	84	10	100	~~106~~	~~106~~	100	16	184	13
2019	Pattaya, Thailand	59 kg	80	~~82~~	—	80	28	100	~~104~~	—	100	29	180	28
2015	Houston, United States	58 kg	81	84	~~87~~	84	25	103	107	~~110~~	107	23	191	22
2011	Paris, France	58 kg	71	74	~~77~~	74	30	92	~~98~~	98	98	26	172	27
Oceania Championships
2018	Mont-Dore, New Caledonia	58 kg	72	77	82	82	1st place, gold medalist(s)	93	100	110	110	1st place, gold medalist(s)	192	1st place, gold medalist(s)
2017	Gold Coast, Australia	58 kg	80	84	87	87	1st place, gold medalist(s)	101	104	109	109	1st place, gold medalist(s)	196	1st place, gold medalist(s)
2016	Suva, Fiji	58 kg	82	85	87	87	1st place, gold medalist(s)	105	108	~~113~~	108	3rd place, bronze medalist(s)	195	2nd place, silver medalist(s)
2014	Mont-Dore, New Caledonia	58 kg	75	80	~~84~~	80	1st place, gold medalist(s)	103	~~110~~	~~110~~	103	1st place, gold medalist(s)	183	1st place, gold medalist(s)
2013	Brisbane, Australia	58 kg	77	80	83	83	2nd place, silver medalist(s)	100	103	~~106~~	103	1st place, gold medalist(s)	186	1st place, gold medalist(s)
2012	Apia, Samoa	58 kg	65	~~68~~	68	68	2nd place, silver medalist(s)	90	93	~~95~~	93	2nd place, silver medalist(s)	161	2nd place, silver medalist(s)
Commonwealth Games
2022	(United Kingdom) Birmingham, Great Britain	55 kg	~~79~~	~~79~~	79	79	5	~~105~~	~~105~~	~~105~~	—	—	—	—
2018	Gold Coast, Australia	58 kg	80	84	~~87~~	84	3	105	~~111~~	—	105	3	189	3rd place, bronze medalist(s)
2014	(United Kingdom) Glasgow, Great Britain	58 kg	~~79~~	79	~~82~~	79	10	102	~~105~~	~~105~~	102	8	181	8
2010	Delhi, India	63 kg	65	70	~~73~~	70	6	90	95	~~97~~	95	6	165	6
Pacific Games (Note: In 2011, 2015, 2019 and 2023 the Pacific Games was Oceania Championship too.)
2023	Honiara, Solomon Islands	55 kg	75	77	82	82	1st place, gold medalist(s)	95	102	108	108	1st place, gold medalist(s)	190	1st place, gold medalist(s)
2019	Apia, Samoa	59 kg	75	79	~~82~~	79	2nd place, silver medalist(s)	99	~~102~~	102	102	2nd place, silver medalist(s)	181	2nd place, silver medalist(s)
2015	Port Moresby, Papua New Guinea	58 kg	~~78~~	78	83	83	1st place, gold medalist(s)	99	105	110	110	1st place, gold medalist(s)	193	1st place, gold medalist(s)
2011	Nouméa, New Caledonia	58 kg	~~70~~	70	75	75	2nd place, silver medalist(s)	93	97	~~101~~	97	2nd place, silver medalist(s)	172	2nd place, silver medalist(s)

== Notes ==
Olympic Games
Preceded by Wendy Hale	Flagbearer for Solomon Islands; London 2012; Rio de Janeiro 2016	Succeeded by Sharon Firisua; Edgar Iro
