= Oceania Weightlifting Championships =

The Oceania Weightlifting Championships is the continental weightlifting championships for Oceanian nations, organised by the Oceania Weightlifting Federation (OWF). Since 1993, the event also incorporates the South Pacific Weightlifting Championships.

== Editions ==
Year	Edition		Venue	Ref
Year	M	W	Venue	Ref
1980	1		Melbourne, Australia	
1981	2		Brisbane, Australia	
1982	3		Apia, Samoa	
1984	4		(French Polynesia) Papeete, Tahiti	
1985	5		Auckland, New Zealand	
1986	6		Noumea, New Caledonia	
1987	7		Canberra, Australia	
1988	8		(French Polynesia) Papeete, Tahiti	
1989	9		Auckland, New Zealand	
1990	10		Melbourne, Australia	
1992	11		Auckland, New Zealand	
1993	12	1	Nauru	
1994	13	2	Guam	
1996	14	3	Apia, Samoa	
1997	15	4	Wellington, New Zealand	
1998	16	5	Nauru	
1999	17	6	Melbourne, Australia	
2000	18	7	Nauru	
2001	19	8	Auckland, New Zealand	
2002	20	9	Suva, Fiji	
2003	21	10	Nukuʻalofa, Tonga	
2004	22	11	Suva, Fiji	
2005	23	12	Melbourne, Australia	
2006	24	13	Apia, Samoa	
2007	25	14	Apia, Samoa	
2008	26	15	Auckland, New Zealand	
2009	27	16	Darwin, Australia	
2010	28	17	Suva, Fiji	
2011	30	18	Darwin, Australia	
2012	31	19	Apia, Samoa	
2013	32	20	Brisbane, Australia	
2014	33	21	Le Mont-Dore, New Caledonia	
2015 (Note: Held as part of the 2015 Pacific Games.)	34	22	Port Moresby, Papua New Guinea	
2016	35	23	Suva, Fiji	
2017	36	24	Gold Coast, Australia	
2018	37	25	Le Mont-Dore, New Caledonia	
2019	38	26	Apia, Samoa	
2020	–	–	Cancelled due to COVID-19 pandemic	
2021	39	27	Held online (various locations) (Note: The enduring impact of COVID-19 on the sporting calendar led to the 2021 championships being held in venues across Oceania with competitors and officials linked by video, as opposed to a single competition venue.)	
2022 (Note: Held as part of the 2022 Pacific Mini Games.)	40	28	Saipan, Northern Mariana Islands	
2023 (Note: Held as part of the 2023 Pacific Games.)	41	29	Honiara, Solomon Islands	
2024	42	30	Auckland, New Zealand	
2025	43	31	Meyuns, Palau	
2026	44	32	Apia, Samoa (Note: The competition will also serve as the qualification event for XXIII Commonwealth Games in Glasgow in 2026.)	
