= Weightlifting at the 2019 Pacific Games =

Weightlifting competition

- Venue: Faleata Sports Complex
- Location: Apia, Samoa
- Dates: 9–13 July 2019

Weightlifting at the 2019 Pacific Games in Apia, Samoa was held on 9–13 July 2019 at the Faleata Sports Complex in Tuanaimato. The competition included ten men's and ten women's weight classes, with separate medals awarded in each weight class for the snatch and clean and jerk, as well as for the total lift.

Together with that year's Commonwealth and Oceania Championships, they were held concurrently as a single event designated the 2019 Pacific Games, Oceania & Commonwealth Championships. Athletes from certain countries were able to contest multiple championships simultaneously (including age-group variants).

== Participating nations ==
- American Samoa
- Australia
- Cook Islands
- Fiji
- Guam
- Kiribati
- Marshall Islands
- Nauru
- New Caledonia
- New Zealand
- Niue
- Papua New Guinea
- Samoa (Host)
- Solomon Islands
- Tahiti
- Tonga
- Tuvalu
- Vanuatu
- Wallis and Futuna

== Medal summary ==
=== Medal table ===
* Host nation (Samoa)

Rank	Nation	Gold	Silver	Bronze	Total
1	Samoa*	16	7	10	33
2	Australia	12	8	12	32
3	Papua New Guinea	8	10	8	26
4	New Zealand	7	7	3	17
5	Kiribati	6	8	1	15
6	Nauru	5	2	11	18
7	Solomon Islands	3	8	5	16
8	Tonga	2	0	2	4
9	Wallis and Futuna	1	2	0	3
10	Guam	0	5	2	7
11	American Samoa	0	2	0	2
12	Marshall Islands	0	1	2	3
Totals (12 entries)		60	60	56	176

=== Men's medalists ===
Event	Gold		Silver		Bronze		Ref
55 kg snatch	Elson Brechtefeld; Nauru	93 kg	Walter Shadrack; Solomon Islands	80 kg	Gahuana Nauari; Papua New Guinea	80 kg	
55 kg clean & jerk	Elson Brechtefeld; Nauru	122 kg	Gahuana Nauari; Papua New Guinea	108 kg	Scofield Sinaka; Papua New Guinea	108 kg	
55 kg total	Elson Brechtefeld; Nauru	215 kg	Gahuana Nauari; Papua New Guinea	188 kg	Walter Shadrack; Solomon Islands	185 kg	
61 kg snatch	Morea Baru; Papua New Guinea	124 kg	Cester Ramohaka; Solomon Islands	99 kg	John Tafi; Samoa	95 kg	
61 kg clean & jerk	Morea Baru; Papua New Guinea	160 kg	Cester Ramohaka; Solomon Islands	127 kg	John Tafi; Samoa	115 kg	
61 kg total	Morea Baru; Papua New Guinea	284 kg OR	Cester Ramohaka; Solomon Islands	226 kg	John Tafi; Samoa	210 kg	
67 kg snatch	Vaipava Ioane; Samoa	125 kg	Ruben Katoatau; Kiribati	122 kg	Ezekiel Moses; Nauru	115 kg	
67 kg clean & jerk	Vaipava Ioane; Samoa	164 kg OR	Ruben Katoatau; Kiribati	160 kg	Ezekiel Moses; Nauru	145 kg	
67 kg total	Vaipava Ioane; Samoa	289 kg OR	Ruben Katoatau; Kiribati	282 kg	Ezekiel Moses; Nauru	260 kg	
73 kg snatch	Taretiita Tabaroua; Kiribati	124 kg	Brandon Wakeling; Australia	123 kg	Ika Aliklik; Nauru	121 kg	
73 kg clean & jerk	Brandon Wakeling; Australia	167 kg	Taretiita Tabaroua; Kiribati	158 kg	Larko Doguape; Nauru	150 kg	
73 kg total	Brandon Wakeling; Australia	290 kg	Taretiita Tabaroua; Kiribati	282 kg	Larko Doguape; Nauru	270 kg	
81 kg snatch	Jack Opeloge; Samoa	138 kg	Cameron McTaggart; New Zealand	137 kg	Kabuati Bob; Marshall Islands	128 kg	
81 kg clean & jerk	Cameron McTaggart; New Zealand	168 kg	Kabuati Bob; Marshall Islands	160 kg	Jack Opeloge; Samoa	160 kg	
81 kg total	Cameron McTaggart; New Zealand	305 kg	Jack Opeloge; Samoa	298 kg	Kabuati Bob; Marshall Islands	288 kg	
89 kg snatch	Don Opeloge; Samoa	145 kg	Boris Elesin; Australia	142 kg	Joel Gregson; Australia	126 kg	
89 kg clean & jerk	Don Opeloge; Samoa	193 kg	Boris Elesin; Australia	166 kg	Joel Gregson; Australia	162 kg	
89 kg total	Don Opeloge; Samoa	338 kg	Boris Elesin; Australia	308 kg	Joel Gregson; Australia	288 kg	
96 kg snatch	Israel Kaikilekofe; Wallis and Futuna	161 kg	Steven Kari; Papua New Guinea	156 kg	Maeu Nanai Livi; Samoa	154 kg	
96 kg clean & jerk	Steven Kari; Papua New Guinea	198 kg	Israel Kaikilekofe; Wallis and Futuna	192 kg	Maeu Nanai Livi; Samoa	181 kg	
96 kg total	Steven Kari; Papua New Guinea	354 kg	Israel Kaikilekofe; Wallis and Futuna	353 kg	Maeu Nanai Livi; Samoa	335 kg	
102 kg snatch	Petunu Opeloge; Samoa	150 kg	David Katoatau; Kiribati	142 kg	Petelo Lautusi; Samoa	140 kg	
102 kg clean & jerk	David Katoatau; Kiribati	196 kg	Petelo Lautusi; Samoa	170 kg	not awarded		
102 kg total	David Katoatau; Kiribati	338 kg	Petelo Lautusi; Samoa	310 kg	not awarded		
109 kg snatch	Sanele Mao; Samoa	160 kg	Matthew Lydement; Australia	156 kg	Sio Pomelile; Tonga	143 kg	
109 kg clean & jerk	Sanele Mao; Samoa	206 kg	Tanumafili Jungblut; American Samoa	194 kg	Jackson Roberts-Young; Australia	192 kg	
109 kg total	Sanele Mao; Samoa	366 kg	Tanumafili Jungblut; American Samoa	336 kg	Jackson Roberts-Young; Australia	333 kg	
+109 kg snatch	Lauititi Lui; Samoa	178 kg	David Liti; New Zealand	177 kg	Aisake Tuitupou; Tonga	140 kg	
+109 kg clean & jerk	Aisake Tuitupou; Tonga	190 kg	Malachi Faamausilifala; Samoa	150 kg	not awarded		
+109 kg total	Aisake Tuitupou; Tonga	330 kg	Malachi Faamausilifala; Samoa	281 kg	not awarded		

=== Women's medalists ===
Event	Gold		Silver		Bronze		Ref
45 kg snatch	Tebora Willy; Kiribati	52 kg	Konio Toua; Papua New Guinea	50 kg	Daniella Ika; Nauru	35 kg	
45 kg clean & jerk	Tebora Willy; Kiribati	67 kg	Konio Toua; Papua New Guinea	65 kg	Dayalani Reiko Vida Calma; Guam	63 kg	
45 kg total	Tebora Willy; Kiribati	119 kg	Konio Toua; Papua New Guinea	115 kg	Daniella Ika; Nauru	82 kg	
49 kg snatch	Dika Toua; Papua New Guinea	75 kg	Dalamaya Aiko Vida Calma; Guam	53 kg	Jaylyn Mala; Solomon Islands	50 kg	
49 kg clean & jerk	Dika Toua; Papua New Guinea	100 kg	Jaylyn Mala; Solomon Islands	65 kg	Dalamaya Aiko Vida Calma; Guam	64 kg	
49 kg total	Dika Toua; Papua New Guinea	175 kg	Dalamaya Aiko Vida Calma; Guam	117 kg	Jaylyn Mala; Solomon Islands	115 kg	
55 kg snatch	Mary Kini Lifu; Solomon Islands	73 kg	Jacinta Sumagaysay; Guam	71 kg	Elizabeth Bisafo; Solomon Islands	69 kg	
55 kg clean & jerk	Mary Kini Lifu; Solomon Islands	89 kg	Jacinta Sumagaysay; Guam	88 kg	Elizabeth Bisafo; Solomon Islands	83 kg	
55 kg total	Mary Kini Lifu; Solomon Islands	162 kg	Jacinta Sumagaysay; Guam	159 kg	Elizabeth Bisafo; Solomon Islands	152 kg	
59 kg snatch	Erika Yamasaki; Australia	80 kg	Jenly Tegu Wini; Solomon Islands	79 kg	Seen Lee; Australia	78 kg	
59 kg clean & jerk	Erika Yamasaki; Australia	103 kg	Jenly Tegu Wini; Solomon Islands	102 kg	Seen Lee; Australia	101 kg	
59 kg total	Erika Yamasaki; Australia	183 kg	Jenly Tegu Wini; Solomon Islands	181 kg	Seen Lee; Australia	179 kg	
64 kg snatch	Kiana Elliott; Australia	99 kg	Sarah Cochrane; Australia	92 kg	Megan Signal; New Zealand	89 kg	
64 kg clean & jerk	Kiana Elliott; Australia	114 kg	Megan Signal; New Zealand	114 kg	Sarah Cochrane; Australia	112 kg	
64 kg total	Kiana Elliott; Australia	213 kg	Sarah Cochrane; Australia	204 kg	Megan Signal; New Zealand	203 kg	
71 kg snatch	Ebony Gorincu; Australia	91 kg	Maximina Uepa; Nauru	86 kg	Sandra Ako; Papua New Guinea	80 kg	
71 kg clean & jerk	Maximina Uepa; Nauru	105 kg	Tiiau Bakaekiri; Kiribati	101 kg	Sandra Ako; Papua New Guinea	98 kg	
71 kg total	Maximina Uepa; Nauru	191 kg	Tiiau Bakaekiri; Kiribati	179 kg	Sandra Ako; Papua New Guinea	178 kg	
76 kg snatch	Kanah Andrews-Nahu; New Zealand	94 kg	Bailey Rogers; New Zealand	92 kg	Stephanie Davies; Australia	85 kg	
76 kg clean & jerk	Kanah Andrews-Nahu; New Zealand	112 kg	Stephanie Davies; Australia	111 kg	Bailey Rogers; New Zealand	110 kg	
76 kg total	Kanah Andrews-Nahu; New Zealand	206 kg	Bailey Rogers; New Zealand	202 kg	Stephanie Davies; Australia	196 kg	
81 kg snatch	Leotina Petelo; Samoa	89 kg	Ariana Uepa; Nauru	71 kg	Noi Igo; Papua New Guinea	70 kg	
81 kg clean & jerk	Leotina Petelo; Samoa	110 kg	Noi Igo; Papua New Guinea	94 kg	Ariana Uepa; Nauru	91 kg	
81 kg total	Leotina Petelo; Samoa	199 kg	Noi Igo; Papua New Guinea	164 kg	Ariana Uepa; Nauru	162 kg	
87 kg snatch	Kaity Fassina; Australia	101 kg	Hayley Whiting; New Zealand	94 kg	Lorraine Harry; Papua New Guinea	85 kg	
87 kg clean & jerk	Kaity Fassina; Australia	119 kg	Lorraine Harry; Papua New Guinea	107 kg	Roviel Detenamo; Nauru	93 kg	
87 kg total	Kaity Fassina; Australia	220 kg	Lorraine Harry; Papua New Guinea	192 kg	Tiaterenga Kaua; Kiribati	165 kg	
+87 kg snatch	Laurel Hubbard; New Zealand	125 kg	Feagaiga Stowers; Samoa	119 kg	Charisma Amoe-Tarrant; Australia	109 kg	
+87 kg clean & jerk	Iuniarra Sipaia; Samoa	147 kg	Laurel Hubbard; New Zealand	143 kg	Feagaiga Stowers; Samoa	142 kg	
+87 kg total	Laurel Hubbard; New Zealand	268 kg	Feagaiga Stowers; Samoa	261 kg	Iuniarra Sipaia; Samoa	255 kg	

== See also ==
- Weightlifting at the Pacific Games
