= 3x3 basketball at the 2019 Pacific Games =

2019 Pacific Games 3x3 basketball

Tournament details
- Host country: Samoa
- City: Apia
- Dates: 18–20 July
- Teams: 12 (men); 13 (women)

The men's and women's tournaments for 3x3 basketball were played at the 2019 Pacific Games on 18–20 July 2019 at the Faleata Sports Complex in Apia, Samoa. The 3x3 format of the game had been introduced to the Pacific Mini Games in 2017, but this was the first time it had been contested at the main Pacific Games.

== Medal summary ==
=== Medal table ===
* Host nation (Samoa)

Rank	Nation	Gold	Silver	Bronze	Total
1	Fiji	1	1	0	2
2	Guam	1	0	0	1
3	Cook Islands	0	1	0	1
4	Samoa*	0	0	1	1
4	Tahiti	0	0	1	1
Totals (5 entries)		2	2	2	6

=== Results ===
Event	Gold	Silver	Bronze
Men's tournament	Guam; Ben Borja; AJ Carlos; Michael Sakazaki; Seve Susuico	Fiji; Henry Tabuduka; Filimone Waqabaca; Joshua Motufaga; Marques Whippy	Samoa; Ezra Tufuga; Dru-Leo Ape; Ryan Paia; Theodore McFarland
Women's tournament	Fiji; Mickaelar Mendez; Bulou Koyamainavure; Letava Whippy; Vilisi Tavui	Cook Islands; Adoniah Lewis; Janet Main; Keziah Lewis; Terai Sadler	Tahiti; Alizee Lefranc; Mahine Tepu; Mahinetea Tavanae; Oceane Lefranc

== Men's tournament ==
Twelve men's 3x3 teams were placed into two pools based on overall National Federation rankings from FIBA as of 1 June 2019. Ten national federations had an existing Oceania zone ranking although two of them, Northern Marianas ranked third and Tonga ranked seventh, did not participate in this Pacific Games tournament.

For the participating teams, the first and fourth best by rank were seeded in Pool A. The second and third best were seeded in Pool B. The remaining positions in each pool were drawn from the lower ranked and unranked teams. The pools and teams (with FIBA zone ranking shown in brackets) are listed below:

Pool A

- Vanuatu (1)
- Fiji (5)
- American Samoa (9)
- Guam (10)
- Nauru (n/a)
- Solomon Islands (n/a)

Pool B

- New Caledonia (2)
- Samoa (4)
- Cook Islands (6)
- Papua New Guinea (8)
- Marshall Islands (n/a)
- Tahiti (n/a)

=== Men's 3x3 players ===
Players on each team, sorted alphabetically by surname, are listed in the table below.

Men's 3x3 at the 2019 Pacific Games
Team	Player 1	Player 2	Player 3	Player 4
American Samoa	Clayton Lam Yuen	Alrome Lutu	Lynel Siu	Jeremiah Tuimaseve
Cook Islands	Teokotai Akania	Brendan Heath	Charlie Hosking	Benjamin Vakatini
Fiji	Joshua Motufaga	Henry Tabuduka	Filimone Waqabaca	Marques Whippy
Guam	Ben Borja	AJ Carlos	Michael Sakazaki	Seve Susuico
Marshall Islands	Lani Ackley	Robert Case	Frederick Kurn	Halber Pinho
New Caledonia	Loïc Ayam	Jocelyn Lissarrague	Stéphane Saminadin	Gwenaël Tari
Nauru	Morrison Depaune	Gaverick Mwareow	Fallon Natano	Rotui Star
Papua New Guinea	Augustine Kaupa	Dia Muri	Obert Muri	Jordan Sere
Samoa	Dru-Leo Ape	Theodore McFarland	Ryan Paia	Ezra Tufuga
Solomon Islands	Augustine Basia	Alex Masaea	Waige Turueke	Allan Wanefai Jnr
Tahiti	Glenn Garbutt	Raimoana Liu	Raimoana Tinirauarii	Reihiti Sommers
Vanuatu	Riki David	Manoah Moli	Jared Ova	Rickie Tambeqwaru

Source: FIBA 3x3 (Archived)

=== Preliminary round ===
Pool A

Pos	Team	Pld	W	L	PF	PA	PD	Qualification	(Fiji)	(Guam)	(Solomon Islands)	(Vanuatu)	(Nauru)	(American Samoa)
1	Fiji	5	5	0	95	50	+45	Qualification to knockout round	—		18–4		21–11	19–8
2	Guam	5	4	1	97	62	+35	Qualification to knockout round	13–16	—	21–11			
3	Solomon Islands	5	2	3	49	67	−18	Qualification to knockout round			—	17–10		8–15
4	Vanuatu	5	2	3	76	84	−8	Qualification to knockout round	14–21	18–21		—	15–8	
5	Nauru	5	1	4	40	78	−38			4–20	3–9		—	
6	American Samoa	5	1	4	66	82	−16			13–22		17–19	13–14	—

Source: FIBA 3x3 (Archived)
Rules for classification: 1) Wins; 2) Head-to-Head record; 3) Points scored; 4) Higher seed.

Pool B

Pos	Team	Pld	W	L	PF	PA	PD	Qualification	(Marshall Islands)	(Samoa)	(New Caledonia)	(French Polynesia)	(Cook Islands)	(Papua New Guinea)
1	Marshall Islands	5	4	1	94	75	+19	Qualification to knockout round	—			10–22	21–17	
2	Samoa	5	4	1	89	67	+22	Qualification to knockout round	12–21	—		17–16		22–7
3	New Caledonia	5	3	2	85	80	+5	Qualification to knockout round	15–21	16–21	—		22–17	
4	(French Polynesia) Tahiti	5	3	2	88	63	+25	Qualification to knockout round			13–15	—		21–15
5	Cook Islands	5	1	4	67	95	−28			7–17		6–16	—	
6	Papua New Guinea	5	0	5	58	101	−43		9–21		8–17		19–20	—

Source: FIBA 3x3 (Archived)
Rules for classification: 1) Wins; 2) Head-to-Head record; 3) Points scored; 4) Higher seed.

=== Knockout round ===
Quarter-finals
19 July 2019 – 16:40
Fiji	21
(French Polynesia) Tahiti	13
19 July 2019 – 17:05
Samoa	19
Solomon Islands	8
19 July 2019 – 17:30
Guam	21
New Caledonia	11
19 July 2019 – 17:55
Marshall Islands	21
Vanuatu	7

Semi-finals
20 July 2019 – 10:50
Fiji	18
Samoa	16
20 July 2019 – 11:15
Guam	14
Marshall Islands	11

Final
20 July 2019 – 13:15
Fiji	18
Guam	20
Third place
20 July 2019 – 12:25
Samoa	19
Marshall Islands	18

Source: FIBA 3x3 (Archived)

== Women's tournament ==
Thirteen women's 3x3 teams were seeded into two pools based on overall National Federation rankings from FIBA as of 1 June 2019. Ten national federations had an existing Oceania zone ranking although two of them, Northern Marianas ranked third and Tonga ranked seventh, did not participate in this Pacific Games tournament.

For the participating teams, the first and fourth best by rank were seeded in Pool A. The second and third best were seeded in Pool B. The remaining positions in each pool were drawn from the lower ranked and unranked teams. The pools and teams (with FIBA zone ranking shown in brackets) are listed below:

Pool A

- Vanuatu (1)
- Fiji (5)
- Cook Islands (6)
- American Samoa (9)
- Kiribati (n/a)
- Marshall Islands (n/a)
- Solomon Islands (n/a)

Pool B

- New Caledonia (2)
- Samoa (4)
- Papua New Guinea (8)
- Guam (10)
- Nauru (n/a)
- Tahiti (n/a)

=== Women's 3x3 players ===
Players on each team, sorted alphabetically by surname, are listed in the table below.

Women's 3x3 at the 2019 Pacific Games
Team	Player 1	Player 2	Player 3	Player 4
American Samoa	Matalena Hunt	Iatoeafualetaeao Leasiolagi	Tauaitala Leasiolagi	Cecilia Taufa'asau
Cook Islands	Adoniah Lewis	Janet Main	Keziah Lewis	Terai Sadler
Fiji	Bulou Koyamainavure	Mickaelar Mendez	Vilisi Tavui	Letava Whippy
Guam	Kali Benavente	Destiny Castro	Joylyn Pangilinan	Mia San Nicolas
Kiribati	Lailai Ng Tak Fai	Kaitia Tooma	Mweao Uereti	Tekenna Raiwan
Marshall Islands	Naupaka Ackley	Joy Ratidara	Neikormo Lanki-Nimoto	Tamara Andrike
New Caledonia	Zorena Adjouhgniope	Nicky Francois	Elia Massette	Adeline Souque
Nauru	Febony Detenamo	Micheala Detenamo	Janet Hubert	Hanna Olsson
Papua New Guinea	Serah Amos	Christine Oscar	Louisa Wallace	Elina Yala
Samoa	Zhanay Hettig	Cherish Manumaleuga	Sommer Motufoua	Aufui Sa'u
Solomon Islands	Elsie Daiwo	Esther Lii	Nisha Meneses	Nicola Pongi
Tahiti	Alizée Lefranc	Océane Lefranc	Mahinetea Tavanae	Mahine Tepu
Vanuatu	Pauline Malanga	Jessie Malverus	Nancy Patterson	Amilia Kasten

Source: FIBA 3x3 (Archived)

=== Preliminary stage ===
Pool A

Pos	Team	Pld	W	L	PF	PA	PD	Qualification	(Fiji)	(Cook Islands)	(Solomon Islands)	(Marshall Islands)	(Vanuatu)	(Kiribati)	(American Samoa)
1	Fiji	6	6	0	112	26	+86	Qualification to knockout round	—	10–7		21–5			21–2
2	Cook Islands	6	5	1	110	31	+79	Qualification to knockout round		—	21–5		19–8	21–2	
3	Solomon Islands	6	4	2	49	72	−23	Qualification to knockout round	3–21		—	10–9		11–6	
4	Marshall Islands	6	3	3	53	75	−22	Qualification to knockout round		2–21		—	13–10		10–8
5	Vanuatu	6	2	4	58	79	−21		7–18		8–12		—	13–11	
6	Kiribati	6	1	5	38	85	−47		2–21			5–14		—	12–5
7	American Samoa	6	0	6	32	84	−52			4–21	7–8		6–12		—

Source: FIBA 3x3 (Archived)
Rules for classification: 1) Wins; 2) Head-to-Head record; 3) Points scored; 4) Higher seed.

Pool B

Pos	Team	Pld	W	L	PF	PA	PD	Qualification	(French Polynesia)	(New Caledonia)	(Samoa)	(Papua New Guinea)	(Nauru)	(Guam)
1	(French Polynesia) Tahiti	5	5	0	84	35	+49	Qualification to knockout round	—	16–7				11–7
2	New Caledonia	5	4	1	77	49	+28	Qualification to knockout round		—	18–12	19–5	16–7	
3	Samoa	5	3	2	55	50	+5	Qualification to knockout round	10–15		—		14–5	w–0( f )
4	Papua New Guinea	5	1	4	48	91	−43	Qualification to knockout round	4–12		12–19	—		
5	Nauru	5	1	4	30	66	−36		7–21			13–15	—	
6	Guam	5	1	4	37	40	−3			11–17		19–12	0( f )–w	—

Source: FIBA 3x3 (Archived)
Rules for classification: 1) Wins; 2) Head-to-Head record; 3) Points scored; 4) Higher seed.

=== Knockout stage ===
Quarter-finals
19 July 2019 – 18:20
Fiji	21
Papua New Guinea	8
19 July 2019 – 18:45
New Caledonia	20
Solomon Islands	13
19 July 2019 – 19:10
Cook Islands	10
Samoa	7
19 July 2019 – 19:35
Tahiti	17
Marshall Islands	5

Semi-finals
20 July 2019 – 10:00
Fiji	19
New Caledonia	10
20 July 2019 – 10:25
Cook Islands	14
Tahiti	11

Final
20 July 2019 – 12:50
Fiji	20
Cook Islands	9
Third place
20 July 2019 – 12:00
Tahiti	16
New Caledonia	8

Source: FIBA 3x3 (Archived)

== See also ==
- Basketball at the 2019 Pacific Games
- Basketball at the Pacific Games
