= Volleyball at the 2019 Pacific Games =

- Venue: Faleata Sports Complex
- Location: Apia, Samoa
- Dates: 8–20 July 2019

Volleyball competitions at the 2019 Pacific Games were held in Apia, Samoa during July 2019. Both indoor volleyball and beach volleyball were played.

== Medal summary ==
=== Medal table ===
* Host nation (Samoa)

Rank	Nation	Gold	Silver	Bronze	Total
1	Tahiti	1	1	0	2
2	New Caledonia	1	0	1	2
3	Wallis and Futuna	0	1	0	1
4	Samoa*	0	0	1	1
Totals (4 entries)		2	2	2	6

=== Results ===
Event	Gold	Silver	Bronze
Men's indoor volleyball	Tahiti	Wallis and Futuna	New Caledonia
Women's indoor volleyball	New Caledonia	Tahiti	Samoa
Men's beach volleyball	Australia; Tim Dickson; Marcus Ferguson	Tahiti; Terau Ena; Jeremie Paraue	Tonga; Semisi Funaki; Tio Fonohema
Women's beach volleyball	Vanuatu; Miller Pata; Sherysyn Toko	Tahiti; Vaihere Fareura; Emere Maau	American Samoa; Litara Keil; Deveney Pula

== Volleyball ==
Indoor volleyball was played at the National University of Samoa.

=== Men's tournament ===
Eleven men's teams participated in 2019:

Pool A	Pool B	Pool C	Pool D
Samoa; American Samoa; Guam	New Caledonia; Tahiti; Micronesia	Kiribati; Solomon Islands; Papua New Guinea	Wallis and Futuna; Tuvalu

=== Women's tournament ===
Seven women's teams participated in 2019:

Pool A	Pool B
Samoa; Solomon Islands; Wallis and Futuna; Guam	New Caledonia; Tahiti; American Samoa

== Beach volleyball ==
The beach volleyball competition was played the Apia Waterfront.

=== Men ===
Sixteen men's beach volleyball teams participated in 2019:

Pool A	Pool B	Pool C	Pool D
Papua New Guinea; Kiribati; Tuvalu; Northern Mariana Islands	Samoa; Cook Islands; Palau; (French Polynesia) Tahiti	Tonga; New Caledonia; American Samoa; Guam	Vanuatu; Solomon Islands; Australia; Nauru

=== Women ===
Eleven women's beach volleyball teams participated in 2019:

Pool A	Pool B	Pool C
Vanuatu; Kiribati; (French Polynesia) Tahiti	Solomon Islands; New Caledonia; Australia; American Samoa	Samoa; Papua New Guinea; Palau; Marshall Islands

== See also ==
- Beach volleyball at the Pacific Games
- Volleyball at the Pacific Games
