= Taekwondo at the 2019 Pacific Games =

Taekwondo competition

- Venue: Faleata Sports Complex
- Location: Apia, Samoa
- Dates: 16–18 July 2019

Taekwondo at the 2019 Pacific Games was held on 16–18 July 2019 in Apia, Samoa.

== Medal summary ==
=== Medal table ===
* Host nation (Samoa)

Rank	Nation	Gold	Silver	Bronze	Total
1	Australia	15	0	0	15
2	Tonga	2	0	3	5
3	Samoa*	1	4	1	6
4	New Zealand	0	3	4	7
5	Guam	0	3	2	5
6	Papua New Guinea	0	3	0	3
7	Solomon Islands	0	2	5	7
8	Fiji	0	1	4	5
9	Kiribati	0	1	3	4
10	New Caledonia	0	0	2	2
11	Vanuatu	0	0	1	1
Totals (11 entries)		18	17	25	60

=== Men ===
Eight individual weight classes for men plus a men's team event was contested.

Event	Gold	Silver	Bronze	Ref
−54 kg	Mackenzie Singleton; Australia	Bobby Willie; Papua New Guinea	Cole Krech-Watene; New Zealand Betaroni Tiaontin; Kiribati	
−58 kg	Safwan Khalil; Australia	Finn Olsen-Hennesy; New Zealand	Leon Ho; Guam Ian Tasso; Vanuatu	
−63 kg	Damon Cavey; Australia	Steven Tommy; Papua New Guinea	Joseph Ho; Guam Sione Tauataina Tufi; Tonga	
−68 kg	Thomas Afonczenko; Australia	Nakibwae Kanimisu; Kiribati	Apisai Baleloa Karuru; Fiji Dorian Mejri; New Caledonia	
−74 kg	Leon Sejranovic; Australia	Alexander Allen; Guam	Malua Tongatapu Puti; Kiribati Alex Ryder; New Zealand	
−80 kg	Jack Marton; Australia	Max Watene; New Zealand	Viliami Moala; Tonga Sakiusa Tuva; Fiji	
−87 kg	Moala Takelo; Samoa	Fred Gwali; Solomon Islands	Josefa Otterbach; Fiji	
+87 kg	Alan Salek; Australia	Kaino Thomsen; Samoa	Tekiteki Ngahe; Tonga Pranit Kumar; Fiji	
Team	Tonga	Samoa	Solomon Islands Kiribati	

=== Women ===
Eight individual weight classes for women plus a women's team event was contested.

Event	Gold	Silver	Bronze	Ref
−46 kg	Serena Stevens; Australia	Rose Mary Tona; Papua New Guinea	Shandrea Nualu; Solomon Islands	
−49 kg	Tamzin Christoffel; Australia	Anegha Narayan; Fiji	only two competitors	
−53 kg	Yasmina Hibic; Australia	Tierra-Lynn Chargualaf; Guam	Cecilia Vili Magele; Samoa Lindsay Gavin; New Caledonia	
−57 kg	Carmen Marton; Australia	Amber Toves; Guam	Janet Kevo; Solomon Islands Stella Bismark; New Zealand	
−62 kg	Rebecca Murray; Australia	Taumaia Mavaeao; Samoa	Malia Pasika; Tonga Victoria Arsapin; New Zealand	
−67 kg	Ruth Hock; Australia	Emily Kwoaetolo; Solomon Islands	only two competitors	
−73 kg	Chelsea Hobday; Australia	only one competitor		
+73 kg	Reba Stewart; Australia	Taylor Shaw; New Zealand	Monica Maunia; Solomon Islands	
Team	Tonga	Samoa	Solomon Islands	

== See also ==
- Taekwondo at the Pacific Games
