= Basketball at the 2019 Pacific Games =

Pacific Games Basketball Tournament
- Apia 2019

Tournament details
- Games: 2019 Pacific Games
- Host nation: Samoa
- City: Apia
- Duration: 8–16 July

Men's tournament
- Teams: 8
Medals
Gold medalists	Guam
Silver medalists	Tahiti
Bronze medalists	Fiji

Women's tournament
- Teams: 8
Medals
Gold medalists	American Samoa
Silver medalists	Fiji
Bronze medalists	Samoa

Tournaments
← 2015	2023 →

Basketball was one of the 26 sports included in the 2019 Pacific Games which were held in Apia, Samoa.

== Competition format ==
The 8 teams were split into two pools of four where round-robin matches were played, with the top two from each pool advancing to the semi-finals or the medal play-offs.

== Qualification ==
For the first time, teams had to qualify for the event to participate in the basketball competition for both men and women through sub-zone qualification tournaments in Melanesia, Micronesia, and Polynesia.

== Men's tournament ==
=== Qualified teams ===
Event	Date	Vacancies	Qualified
Host Nation	1 September 2017	1	Samoa
2017 FIBA Melanesia Basketball Cup	27−30 September 2017	3	Papua New Guinea; New Caledonia; Fiji
2018 Micronesian Games	15−23 July 2018	1	Guam
2018 FIBA Polynesia Basketball Cup	19−24 November 2018	2	(French Polynesia) Tahiti; Tonga
Wildcard	19 February 2019	1	Solomon Islands
Total		8	

== Women's tournament ==
=== Qualified teams ===
Event	Date	Vacancies	Qualified
Host Nation	1 September 2017	1	Samoa
2017 FIBA Women's Melanesia Basketball Cup	27−30 September 2017	3	Papua New Guinea; Fiji; New Caledonia
2018 Micronesian Games	15−23 July 2018	1	Guam
2018 FIBA Women's Polynesia Basketball Cup	19−24 November 2018	2	Cook Islands (French Polynesia) Tahiti
Wildcard	15 March 2019	1	American Samoa
Total		8	

== Participating nations ==
Ten countries are expected to compete in basketball at the 2019 Pacific Games:

- American Samoa (12)
- Cook Islands (12)
- Fiji (24)
- Guam (24)
- New Caledonia (24)
- Papua New Guinea (24)
- Samoa (24) (Host)
- Solomon Islands (12)
- French Polynesia (24)
- Tonga (12)

== Medal summary ==
=== Medal table ===
* Host nation (Samoa)

Rank	Nation	Gold	Silver	Bronze	Total
1	American Samoa (ASA)	1	0	0	1
1	Guam (GUM)	1	0	0	1
3	Fiji (FIJ)	0	1	1	2
4	French Polynesia (TAH)	0	1	0	1
5	Samoa (SAM)*	0	0	1	1
Totals (5 entries)		2	2	2	6

=== Results ===
Event	Gold	Silver	Bronze
Men	Guam; Tomas Calvo; Earvin Jose; Willie Stinnett III; Billy Belger III; JP Cruz; Mekeli Wesley; Daren Hechanova; Ben Borja II; Russell Wesley; Takumi Simon; Tai Wesley; Jonathan Galloway	Tahiti; Heimoana Teamotuaitau; Ariirimarau Meuel; Teva Lextreyt; Landry Liu; Haunui Apeang; Tevae Teihotu; Jacky Leau Kang Mui; Derrick Scott; Michel Audouin; Vairupe Perez; Raimoana Tinirauarii; Reihiti Sommers	Fiji; Marques Whippy; Filimone Waqabaca; Isireli Vuetibau; Orisi Naivalurua; Conrad Fox; Leonard Whippy; Joshua Fox; Henry Tabuduka; Joshua Motufaga; Mataika Koyamainavure; Marika Binatagi; Iliesa Salauca
Women	American Samoa; Mahina Hannemann-Gago; Malia Nawahine; Sarah Toeaina; Natallia Cravens; Meghan Peneueta; Makenna Peneueta; Leah Salonoa; Joeseta Fatuesi; Katherine Peneueta; Lahni Salanoa; Valerie Nawahine Tanuvasa; Jazmine Davis	Fiji; Letava Whippy; Kayla Mendez; Tiyana Kainamoli; Valerie Nainima; Lini Katia; Mili Koyamainavure; Nowa Naivalurua; Estelle Kainamoli; Kalesi Tawake; Vilisi Tavui; Moana Liebregts	Samoa; Fialauia Hunt; Oriana-Rose Siamoa; Juanita-Anne Wright; Kalista Niu; Cherish Manumaleuga; Sommer Motufoua; Malama Leaupepe; Sweetie Hicks; Zhanay Hettig; Utu Vaimauga; Theresa Vaoliko; Aufui Sau
