= Powerlifting at the 2019 Pacific Games =

2019 Pacific Games event

- Venue: Faleata Sports Complex
- Location: Apia, Samoa
- Dates: 18–19 July 2019

Powerlifting at the 2019 Pacific Games in Apia, Samoa was held on 18–19 July 2019 at the Faleata Sports Complex in Tuanaimato. The competition included eight men's and seven women's weight classes.

== Medal summary ==
=== Medal table ===
* Host nation (Samoa)

Rank	Nation	Gold	Silver	Bronze	Total
1	Papua New Guinea	6	5	3	14
2	Nauru	6	4	2	12
3	Samoa*	3	1	2	6
4	Tahiti	0	3	1	4
5	Kiribati	0	1	3	4
6	Tuvalu	0	1	0	1
7	New Caledonia	0	0	3	3
8	Fiji	0	0	1	1
Totals (8 entries)		15	15	15	45

=== Men ===
Event	Gold	Silver	Bronze
−59kg	Kalau Andrew; Papua New Guinea	Martin Taitus; Papua New Guinea	Tibaa Taabureia; Kiribati
−66kg	Derby Rodiben; Nauru	Nantei Nikora; Kiribati	Ruben Noi John; Papua New Guinea
−74kg	Nitram Dagagio; Nauru	Larsen Lio; Papua New Guinea	Kaoma Taake; Kiribati
−83kg	Deamo Baguga; Nauru	Gaimunum Adam; Nauru	Marc Lisan; Tahiti
−93kg	Jesse Roland; Nauru	Miguel Hopuetai; Tahiti	Frederick Warsidi; New Caledonia
−105kg	Josh Cook; Nauru	Titi Misili Penieli; Samoa	Alfred Mel; Papua New Guinea
−120kg	Koale Tasi Taala; Samoa	Telupe Iosefa; Tuvalu	Tavita Lipine; Samoa
+120kg	Oliva Kirisome; Samoa	Vagi Henry; Papua New Guinea	Julien Moala; New Caledonia

=== Women ===
Event	Gold	Silver	Bronze
−47kg	Neville Benson; Papua New Guinea	Ashly Detabouw; Nauru	Lucy Dia; Papua New Guinea
−52kg	Dobi Morea; Papua New Guinea	Samantha Gware; Papua New Guinea	Verana Olsson; Nauru
−57kg	Belinda Umang; Papua New Guinea	Sandra Pratz; Tahiti	Shannon Maboumda; New Caledonia
−63kg	Dika Igo; Papua New Guinea	Heilani Sao Yao; Tahiti	Sainimere Abariga; Fiji
−72kg	Linda Pulsan; Papua New Guinea	Jovina Fritz; Nauru	Junior Erisabeth Kirata; Kiribati
−84kg	Niusila Opeloge; Samoa	Meteng Wak; Papua New Guinea	Perina Fritz; Nauru
+84kg	Yurika Kepae; Nauru	Giovika Kepae; Nauru	Moala Sooalo-Toai; Samoa

== See also ==
- Powerlifting at the Pacific Games
