= Shooting at the 2019 Pacific Games =

Shooting competition

- Venue: Tafaigata Shooting Range
- Location: Apia, Samoa
- Dates: 15–19 July 2019

Shooting at the 2019 Pacific Games in Samoa was held from 15 to 19 July 2019 at the Tafaigata Shooting Range near Apia. Five disciplines were contested; three on the down-the-line shotgun range, and two at the indoor pistol range. Medals were awarded for both individual and team events in each discipline. The competition was not gender specific, with all events open to men and women.

== Teams ==
The nations competing were:

- Fiji
- New Caledonia
- Niue
- Norfolk Island
- Papua New Guinea
- Samoa
- Tahiti

== Medal summary ==
=== Medal table ===
* Host nation (Samoa)

Rank	Nation	Gold	Silver	Bronze	Total
1	Tahiti	4	4	2	10
2	New Caledonia	3	2	3	8
3	Fiji	2	0	1	3
4	Samoa*	1	4	1	6
5	Norfolk Island	0	0	3	3
Totals (5 entries)		10	10	10	30

=== Pistol ===
Event	Gold	Silver	Bronze
Pistol 25 m individual	Freddy Yen Kway; Tahiti	Cédric Limousin; New Caledonia	Douglas Creek; Norfolk Island
Standard pistol 25 m individual	Cédric Limousin; New Caledonia	Freddy Yen Kway; Tahiti	Johan Perchard; New Caledonia
Pistol 25 m team	New Caledonia; Cédric Limousin; Johan Perchard	Tahiti; Maeva Normand; Freddy Yen Kway	Norfolk Island; Kevin Coulter; Douglas Creek
Standard pistol 25 m team	New Caledonia; Cédric Limousin; Johan Perchard	Tahiti; Maeva Normand; Freddy Yen Kway	Norfolk Island; Kevin Coulter; Douglas Creek

=== Shotgun ===
Event	Gold	Silver	Bronze
Double barrel individual	Franco Caffarelli; Samoa	Tuanua Degage; Tahiti	Glenn Kable; Fiji
Single barrel individual	Glenn Kable; Fiji	Franco Caffarelli; Samoa	Tuanua Degage; Tahiti
Points score individual	Glenn Kable; Fiji	Franco Caffarelli; Samoa	Tuanua Degage; Tahiti
Double barrel team	Tahiti; Tuanua Degage; Moeava Bambridge; Pascal Brettes	Samoa; Franco Caffarelli; Paul Loibl; Robert Maskell	New Caledonia; Fabrice Azzaro; Kevin Lepigeon; Marion Roumagne
Single barrel team	Tahiti; Tuanua Degage; Moeava Bambridge; Pascal Brettes	New Caledonia; Marion Roumagne; Fabrice Azzaro; Kevin Lepigeon	Samoa; Franco Caffarelli; Paul Loibl; Leasi Galuvao
Points score team	Tahiti; Tuanua Degage; Pascal Brettes; Moeava Bambridge	Samoa; Franco Caffarelli; Siegfried Sanford; Leasi Galuvao	New Caledonia; Marion Roumagne; Kevin Lepigeon; Fabrice Azzaro
