= Tennis at the 2019 Pacific Games =

Tennis at the 2019 Pacific Games in Apia, Samoa was held on 8–13 July 2019 at the Apia Park Tennis Courts.

== Medal summary ==
=== Medal table ===
* Host nation (Samoa)

Rank	Nation	Gold	Silver	Bronze	Total
1	Papua New Guinea	3	5	0	8
2	Northern Mariana Islands	3	1	0	4
3	Tonga	1	0	0	1
4	Samoa*	0	1	1	2
5	American Samoa	0	0	4	4
6	Tahiti	0	0	1	1
6	Vanuatu	0	0	1	1
Totals (7 entries)		7	7	7	21

=== Medalists ===
Event	Gold	Silver	Bronze
Men's singles	Colin Sinclair; Northern Mariana Islands	Matthew Stubbings; Papua New Guinea	Clément Mainguy; Vanuatu
Women's singles	Abigail Tere-Apisah; Papua New Guinea	Violet Apisah; Papua New Guinea	Kalani Soli; American Samoa
Men's doubles	Matavo Fanguna and Semisi Fanguna (TGA)	Colin Sinclair and Robert Schorr (NMI)	Leon Soonalole and Marvin Soonalole (SAM)
Women's doubles	Abigail Tere-Apisah and Violet Apisah (PNG)	Patricia Apisah and Marcia Tere-Apisah (PNG)	Kalani Soli and Charity Sagiao (ASA)
Mixed doubles	Carol Young Suh Lee and Colin Sinclair (NMI)	Matthew Stubbings and Abigail Tere-Apisah (PNG)	Christian Duchnak and Kalani Soli (ASA)
Men's team	Northern Mariana Islands; Colin Sinclair; Robert Schorr; Ken Song	Papua New Guinea; Matthew Stubbings; Mark Gibbons; Eddie Mera	Tahiti; Heve Kelley; Heimanarii Lai San; Ridge Chung; Gillian Osmont
Women's team	Papua New Guinea; Abigail Tere-Apisah; Violet Apisah; Patricia Apisah; Marcia Tere-Apisah	Samoa; Steffi Carruthers; Eleanor Schuster; Sauleone Saipele; Penina Kamu	American Samoa; Kalani Soli; Charity Sagiao; Francine Amoa; Paris Redskin; Alice Asalele

== See also ==
- Tennis at the Pacific Games
