= Squash at the 2019 Pacific Games =

- Venue: Faleata Sports Complex
- Location: Apia, Samoa
- Dates: 8–19 July 2019

Squash at the 2019 Pacific Games in Apia, Samoa was held on 8–19 July 2019. The competition schedule included men's, women's and mixed events. The tournament was played on the Samoa Squash Courts at the Faleata Sports Complex in Tuanaimato, and the Oceania Squash Championships were held in conjunction with the Pacific Games at the same venue.

== Teams ==
The nations competing were:

- Fiji
- New Caledonia
- Norfolk Island
- Papua New Guinea
- Samoa
- Tahiti

== Medal summary ==
=== Medal table ===
* Host nation (Samoa)

Rank	Nation	Gold	Silver	Bronze	Total
1	New Caledonia (NCL)	7	3	4	14
2	Samoa (SAM)*	0	2	2	4
3	Papua New Guinea (PNG)	0	2	0	2
4	Fiji (FIJ)	0	0	1	1
Totals (4 entries)		7	7	7	21

=== Medalists ===
Event	Gold	Silver	Bronze
Men's singles	Enzo Corigliano; New Caledonia	Yann Lancrenon; New Caledonia	Nicolas Massenet; New Caledonia
Women's singles	Vanessa Quach; New Caledonia	Christine Deneufbourg; New Caledonia	Kareen Marechalle; New Caledonia
Men's doubles	Enzo Corigliano and Yann Lancrenon (NCL)	Lokes Brooksbank and Madako Suari Jr (PNG)	Gaël Gosse and Nicolas Massenet (NCL)
Women's doubles	Kareen Marechalle and Christielle Nagle (NCL)	Samantha Marfleet-Manu and Lupe Kapisi (SAM)	Caroline Quach and Vanessa Quach (NCL)
Mixed doubles	Christelle Nagle and Yann Lancrenon (NCL)	Vanessa Quach and Nicolas Massenet (NCL)	Lupe Kapisi and Ivan Chewlit (SAM)
Men's team	New Caledonia (NCL)	Papua New Guinea (PNG)	Samoa (SAM)
Women's team	New Caledonia (NCL)	Samoa (SAM)	Fiji (FIJ)

== See also ==
- Squash at the Pacific Games
