= Israel Kaikilekofe =

Wallisian weightlifter

Personal information
- Born: 19 November 1997

Sport
- Country: Wallis and Futuna
- Sport: Weightlifting
Medal record
Men's Weightlifting
Representing Wallis and Futuna
Pacific Games
Gold medal – first place	2019 Apia	96kg snatch
Silver medal – second place	2019 Apia	96kg clean & jerk
Silver medal – second place	2019 Apia	96kg total
Pacific Mini Games
Gold medal – first place	2017 Port Vila	85kg snatch
Silver medal – second place	2017 Port Vila	85kg clean & jerk
Silver medal – second place	2017 Port Vila	85kg total

Israel Sutino Kaikilekofe is a Wallisian Weightlifter who has represented Wallis and Futuna at the Pacific Games and Pacific Mini Games.

Kaikilekofe has been weightlifting since the age of eight.

At the 2017 Pacific Mini Games he won a gold and two silvers in the 85 kg class.

At the 2019 Pacific Games in Apia he won a gold and two silvers in the 96 kg class. He came 31st in the 96 kg class at the 2019 World Weightlifting Championships.
