= Marshall Islands at the 2019 Pacific Games =

- National federation: Marshall Islands National Olympic Committee
- Website: www.oceaniasport.com/marshalls

in Apia, Samoa 8 July 2019 – 20 July 2019
- Competitors: 17 (8 men and 9 women) in 4 sports
- Medals Ranked 22nd: Gold 0 Silver 1 Bronze 2 Total 3

Pacific Games appearances
- 1999; 2003; 2007; 2011; 2015; 2019; 2023

The Marshall Islands was represented at the 2019 Pacific Games in Apia, Samoa by the Marshall Islands National Olympic Committee.

In total, 17 athletes including 8 men and 9 women represented Marshall Islands in five different sports including athletics, basketball, swimming, volleyball and weightlifting.

The Marshall Islands won a total of three medals at the games, all in weightlifting. Competing in the 81 kg category, Kabuati Bob claimed silver in the clean and jerk and bronze in the snatch, winning bronze overall.

== Background ==
Originally, the 2019 Pacific Games were to ba staged in Nukuʻalofa, Tonga However, the country pulled out of hosting the games in 2017. Following a second bidding process, the games were awarded to Apia, Samoa and would be staged between 6 and 20 July 2019.

== Competitors ==
In total, 17 athletes represented the Marshall Islands at the 2019 Pacific Games in Apia, Samoa across five different sports.

Sport	Men	Women	Total
Athletics	1	0	1
Basketball	4	4	8
Swimming	0	2	2
Volleyball	0	3	3
Weightlifting	3	0	3
Total	8	9	17

== Medalists ==
The Marshall Islands won a total of three medals at the games. Competing in the men's weightlifting 81 kg category, Kabuati Bob claimed silver in the clean and jerk and bronze in the snatch, winning bronze overall.

Medal	Name	Sport	Event
Silver	Kabuati Bob	Weightlifting	Men's 81 kg clean and jerk
Bronze	Kabuati Bob	Weightlifting	Men's 81 kg snatch
Bronze	Kabuati Bob	Weightlifting	Men's 81 kg overall

== Athletics ==
In total, one Marshallese athlete participated in the athletics events – Sione Aho.

== Basketball ==
In total, eight Marshallese athletes participated in the basketball events – Lani Ackley, Naupaka Nomai Ackley, Tamara Salome Andrike, Robert Case, Frederick Kurn, Neikormo Lanki-Nimoto, Halber Royden Peter Pinho and Joy Ratidara.

== Swimming ==
In total, two Marshallese athletes participated in the swimming events – Colleen Furgeson and Ann-Marie Hepler.

== Volleyball ==
In total, three Marshallese athletes participated in the volleyball events – Aliyah Brown, Darcyann Muller and Sidra Triplett.

== Weightlifting ==
In total, three Marshallese athletes participated in the weightlifting events – Kabuati Bob, Joshua Ralpho, Mike Riklon.
