= New Zealand at the 2019 Pacific Games =

- IOC code: NZL

in Apia, Samoa 8 July 2019 – 20 July 2019
- Competitors: 47 (33 men and 14 women) in 5 sports
- Medals Ranked 9th: Gold 8 Silver 10 Bronze 7 Total 25

Pacific Games appearances
- 2015; 2019; 2023

New Zealand competed at the 2019 Pacific Games in Apia, Samoa from 7 to 20 July 2019. A team of 47 athletes was selected to represent the country for New Zealand's second appearance at the Pacific Games. New Zealand competed in five sports.

== Competitors ==
The following is the list of number of competitors (per gender) at the games per sport/discipline:

Sport	Men	Women	Total
Archery	3	3	6
Athletics	2	3	5
Football	20	—N/a	20
Taekwondo	5	3	8
Weightlifting	3	5	8
Total	33	14	47

== Archery ==
New Zealand qualified 6 archers for the games.

=== Men ===
- Bradley Foster
- Adam Kaluzny
- Caleb Russ

=== Women ===
- Sarah Fuller
- Olivia Hodgson
- Suzanne Sundheim

== Athletics ==
=== Men ===
- James Guthrie-Croft
- Brayden Grant

=== Women ===
- Sarah Langsbury
- Alana Ryan
- Emma Wilson

== Football ==
The New Zealand U-23 team played in the men's tournament at the 2019 games.

Men's squad

The New Zealand U-23 team began their campaign with a 13-0 victory over Tonga on 8 July 2019. Captain Logan Rogersin scored a hat-trick in the match.

Squad: Camerson Brown, Jordan Spain, Robert Tipelu, Dane Schnell, Ollie Whyte, Lachie Mslsaac, Logan Rogerson (c), Seth Clark, Jackson Brady, Dylan De Jong, Byron Heath, Jake Porter, Stafford Dowling, Conor Tracey, Jorge Akers, Sean Cooper.

== Taekwondo ==
- Cole Krech-Watene
- Victoria Arsapin
- Alex Ryder
- Max Watene
- Finn Olsen-Hennessy
- Stella Bismark
- Nipesh Prakash
- Taylor Shaw

== Weightlifting ==
- Kanah Andrews-Nahu
- Andy Barakauskas
- Laurel Hubbard
- David Liti
- Cameron McTaggart
- Bailey Rogers
- Megan Signal
- Haley Whiting
