= Earvin Jose =

Guamanian basketball player and businessman

Personal information
- Born: April 6, 1992 (age 34)
- Listed height: 6 ft 1 in (1.85 m)
- Listed weight: 196 lb (89 kg)
- Position: Guard

Career history
- ??-2016: Sushi Rockets
- 2017: Toothfairies
Medals
Men's basketball
Representing Guam
Pacific Games
| Gold medal – first place | 2019 Pacific Games | Team |

Earvin Jose (born April 6, 1992) is a retired Guamanian basketball player who has represented the Guam national basketball team, and a prominent businessman in his country. He has been described as "a mainstay in Guam basketball." His playing position was that of guard.

== Professional career ==
Jose played for the Sushi Rockets team during Guam Basketball Association's 2016 season. In 2017, he played for the Toothfairies side. He also competed at the 2017 Summerjam Day of Champions tournament for the HVK Bulldogs basketball team, where he was the scoring leader of the tournament and led his team to the Men's varsity division title game. Jose scored 133 points in this tournament, for an average of 16 points per game, receiving the Bank of Guam award as the tournament's top scorer.

== National team career ==
Earvin Jose has appeared in a total of seven FIBA Asia Cup basketball tournament's qualification games and at various other tournaments representing Guam. At the Asia Cup qualifiers, he scored 5 points per game while making 50 percent of his shots from the 2 point area, 42.9 percent of his three point shots and 80 percent of his free throw shots, with 1.6 rebounds and 0.4 assists per game. The national team won six of the seven Asia Cup qualification games he played at, losing only to the New Zealand team. Jose won a gold medal as a member of the Guam men's national basketball team at the 2019 Pacific Games. Jose's highest point outpost in the latter tournament was 15 points versus the Samoan team in Guam's first game; he averaged 5.4 points, 2.4 rebounds and 0.6 assists per game in the competition.

== Businessman ==
Once he retired, Jose embarked in a new career as a businessman. He was named, on January 14, 2021, general manager of the Guam Brewery. He has also been nominated for various business awards: He was nominated for the 2018 Guam Young Professional of the Year award and was also a 2019 Guam Business Magazine "40 under 40" candidate.
