= 2019 Pacific Games =

16th edition of the Pacific Games

XVI Pacific Games
- Official logo of the Games
- Host city: Apia
- Country: Samoa
- Motto: One in Spirit
- Nations: 24
- Athletes: ~ 3,500
- Events: 26 sports
- Opening: 7 July 2019
- Closing: 20 July 2019
- Opened by: Va'aletoa Sualauvi II
- Main venue: Apia Park Stadium
- Website: samoa2019.ws

The 16th Pacific Games (Samoan: Taʻaloga Lona-Sefulu-Ono a le Pasefika), also known as Apia 2019, were held from 7 to 20 July 2019. The Games were held in Apia, Samoa, returning there for the first time since 2007. It was the third time overall that the Pacific Games were held in Samoa.

The event was initially awarded to Nukuʻalofa, Tonga, but the Tongan government officially withdrew from hosting it in May 2017, amid concerns the country could face economic difficulties if it proceeded.

These Games included an additional discipline for basketball, which is the 3x3 format, as well as the return of archery and badminton which were not on the 2015 Pacific Games program.

== Host selection ==
=== First bidding process ===
In mid 2012, two cities were confirmed as serious bidders in hosting the 2019 Pacific Games. They were:

- Nukuʻalofa, Tonga and
- Papeete, French Polynesia (Tahiti)

The final presentations of the bids were made on 19 October 2012 in Wallis & Futuna. Tahiti's presentation was led by the country's Minister for Education, Youth and Sports, Tauhiti Nena; Tonga's was led by Crown Prince Tupoutoʻa ʻUlukalala, by the President of the Tonga Association of Sport and National Olympic Committee, Lord Tupou, and by Minister for Sports Lord Vaea. Paea Wolfgramm, Tonga's only Olympic medallist at that time (he had won a silver medal in boxing at the 1996 Summer Olympics), spoke of the promise of sports development and was the highlight of both presentations. Tonga had never hosted the Games; its bid to host the 2015 Games had been defeated by Papua New Guinea's. Tahiti had hosted the Games twice, in 1971 and 1995.

In its bid, French Polynesia emphasised "its successful experiences of hosting international sporting events". It noted that its planned investments in sports infrastructures would "intensify sport practice of several tens of thousands of citizens and rise to the high-level several hundreds of young Polynesians", and suggested that the Games would "contribute to a better insertion of our country" into the Pacific region, highlighting the positive values of a shared "Polynesian soul".

In his written submission to the Pacific Games Council in April 2012, Tongan Prime Minister Lord Tuʻivakano referred to his country's transition to democracy with the November 2010 general election, and suggested that awarding the Games to Tonga would "send a strong and unmistakable signal in support of democracy in our region". The then-Minister for Sports Sosefo Vakata asked the Council to grant the Games to a country that had not hosted them yet, in the name of equality and so that Tonga might enjoy "the benefits that other bigger economies in the region have enjoyed since the Game’s inception". He also reminded the Council that Tonga had the experience of having hosted the 1989 South Pacific Mini Games, though "nothing can equal the greatest gathering in the region which the Pacific Games is proud of". The country proposed an upgrade of its sports facilities, notably the Teufaiva Stadium for athletics, the Lototonga Football Complex, and the ‘Atele Indoor Stadium to host six sporting events. A new sports complex would be built at Lototonga for a number of other events, as would a Lototonga Aquatic Centre.

Following its successful bid, Tonga hoped for investments to build venues and facilities, particularly from China and Japan.

==== Tongan withdrawal ====
On Monday 15 May 2017 the Prime Minister announced that Tonga would withdraw from hosting the 2019 Pacific Games amid concerns the country could face economic difficulties if it staged the event. A spokesman for the Tongan Cabinet told Kaniva News that Prime Minister ʻAkilisi Pōhiva had decided to save the country from a "costly mistake".

=== Second bidding process ===
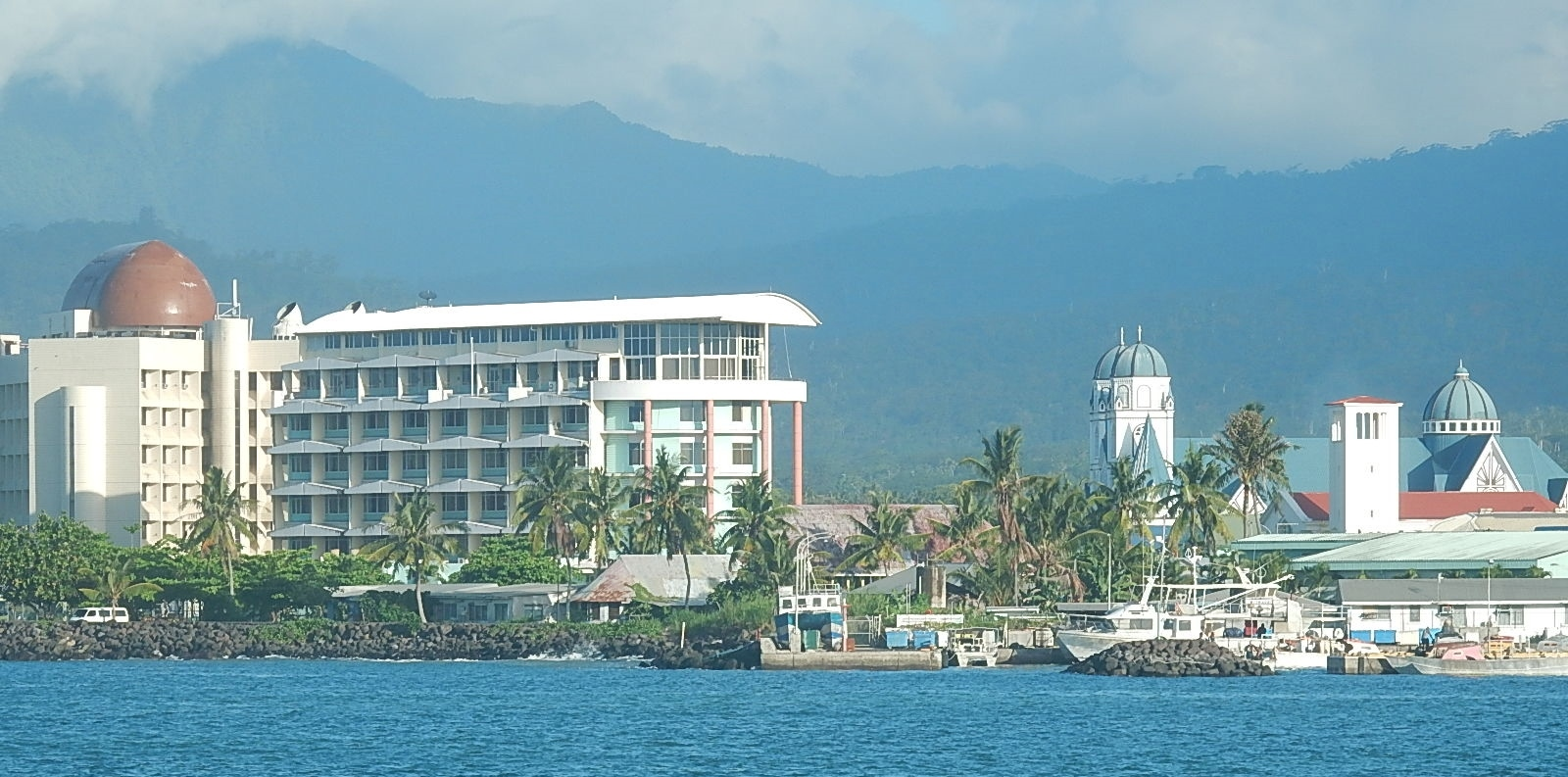
Apia was selected as the host city of the 2019 Pacific Games

Following the withdrawal of Tonga as hosts, the Pacific Games Council set a deadline date (31 July 2017) of interested countries that would be willing to replace Tonga. By the 31 July deadline, three countries expressed their interest in hosting the games. They are:

- Guam
- Samoa
- French Polynesia (Tahiti)

2019 Pacific Games bidding results
City	Nation	Votes
Apia	Samoa	Unanimous

== Participating countries ==
Twenty-four nations competed at the 2019 games. Twenty-two Pacific Games Association members sent teams (the full complement of countries and territories), plus Australia and New Zealand.

- American Samoa
- Australia (42)^{a}
- Cook Islands
- Fiji
- Guam (150)^{b}
- Kiribati
- Marshall Islands
- Federated States of Micronesia
- Nauru
- New Caledonia (327)^{c}
- New Zealand (55)^{d}
- Niue
- Norfolk Island
- Northern Mariana Islands
- Palau
- Papua New Guinea (391)
- Samoa (Host)
- Solomon Islands
- Tahiti
- Tokelau
- Tonga
- Tuvalu
- Vanuatu
- Wallis and Futuna
Note: A number in parentheses indicate the size of a country's team (athletes and officials, if known).

== Sports ==
A total of 26 sports were contested at this edition of the games.

- Archery (10)
- Athletics (48)
- Badminton (6)
- Basketball
  - Basketball (2)
  - 3x3 basketball (2)
- Boxing (13)
- Cricket (2)
- Football (2)
- Golf (4)
- Judo (18)
- Lawn bowls (8)
- Netball (1)
- Outrigger canoeing (12)
- Powerlifting (15)
- Rugby league nines (2)
- Rugby sevens (2)
- Sailing (6)
- Shooting (10)
- Squash (7)
- Swimming (42)
- Table tennis (11)
- Taekwondo (18)
- Tennis (7)
- Touch rugby (3)
- Triathlon (6)
- Volleyball
  - Volleyball (2)
  - Beach volleyball (2)
- Weightlifting (60)

== Medal table ==
The medal tally of the 2019 Pacific Games:

* Host nation (Samoa)

Rank	Nation	Gold	Silver	Bronze	Total
1	New Caledonia	76	55	51	182
2	Papua New Guinea	38	57	35	130
3	Samoa*	38	42	45	125
4	Tahiti	35	39	45	119
5	Fiji	35	38	43	116
6	Australia	33	9	14	56
7	Nauru	12	6	16	34
8	Tonga	9	5	14	28
9	New Zealand	8	10	7	25
10	Vanuatu	8	5	12	25
11	Kiribati	6	10	9	25
12	Cook Islands	5	5	8	18
13	Solomon Islands	4	13	19	36
14	Guam	3	10	6	19
15	Wallis and Futuna	3	6	2	11
16	Northern Mariana Islands	3	1	0	4
17	Norfolk Island	2	2	3	7
18	American Samoa	1	5	7	13
19	Niue	1	1	2	4
20	Tuvalu	1	1	1	3
21	Federated States of Micronesia	1	0	0	1
22	Marshall Islands	0	1	2	3
23	Tokelau	0	0	1	1
24	Palau	0	0	0	0
Totals (24 entries)		322	321	342	985

== Calendar ==
The following table provides a summary of the competition schedule.

All dates are West Samoa Time (UTC+13)

OC	Opening ceremony	●	Event competitions	1	Event finals	CC	Closing ceremony

July	7 Sun	8 Mon	9 Tue	10 Wed	11 Thu	12 Fri	13 Sat	14 Sun	15 Mon	16 Tue	17 Wed	18 Thu	19 Fri	20 Sat	Events
Ceremonies	OC													CC	
Archery		●	4	2	●	4									10
Athletics									5	11	7	14	9	2	48
Badminton		●	●	1	●	●	5								6
3x3 basketball												●	●	2	2
Basketball		●	●	●	●	●	●		●	●	2				2
Boxing									●	●	●	●	13		13
Cricket		●	●	●	●	●	2								2
Football		●		●		●			●			●		2	2
Golf				●	●	●	4								4
Judo									7	7	4				18
Lawn Bowls		●	●	4	●	●	4								8
Netball									●	●	●	●	●	1	1
Outrigger Canoeing			2	6		2	2								12
Powerlifting												10	5		15
Rugby League Nines		●	2												2
Rugby Sevens						●	2								2
Sailing			●	●	●	●	2		●	●	●	●	4		6
Shooting									2	2	2	2	2		10
Squash		●	●	●	2	●	●		●	2	●	●	3		7
Swimming		2	9	8	8	6	9								42
Table Tennis		●	●	2	●	1	8								11
Taekwondo											8	8	2		18
Tennis		●	●	●	●	2	●		●	●	●	3	2		7
Touch Rugby									●	●	2	●	●	1	3
Triathlon													3	3	6
Beach volleyball		●	●	●	●	2									2
Volleyball					●	●	●		●	●	●	●	1	1	2
Weightlifting			12	9	9	12	18								60
July	7 Sun	8 Mon	9 Tue	10 Wed	11 Thu	12 Fri	13 Sat	14 Sun	15 Mon	16 Tue	17 Wed	18 Thu	19 Fri	20 Sat	Events

== Venues ==
The games will take place in 11 venues spread across the host city of Samoa.

== Notes ==
^ a Australia sent a team of 42 athletes.

^ b Guam: A team of 150 athletes and staff was sent to represent the territory in eleven disciplines at the games.

^ c New Caledonia sent 327 athletes.

^ d New Zealand sent 55 athletes.
