= Niue at the 2019 Pacific Games =

- IOC code: NIU

8 July 2019 – 20 July 2019
- Competitors: in 8 sports

Pacific Games appearances
- 1963; 1966–1975; 1979; 1983; 1987; 1991; 1995; 1999; 2003; 2007; 2011; 2015; 2019; 2023

Niue competed at the 2019 Pacific Games in Apia, Samoa from 7 to 20 July 2019. The country participated in eight sports at the 2019 games.

== Boxing ==
Men

Athlete	Event	Preliminaries	Quarterfinals	Semifinals	Final	
Athlete	Event	Opposition Result	Opposition Result	Opposition Result	Opposition Result	Rank
Zalmon Meti Mata'u	Welter (69kg)	bye	(Samoa) Marion Ah Tong; L	—	—	
Bravely Mata'u	Light Heavy (81kg)	bye	(Tonga) Ken Hurrell; L	—	—	
Travis Tapatuetoa	Heavy (91kg)	—	(Fiji) Daniel Whippy; W	(Papua New Guinea) Arthur Lavalou; L	—	3rd place, bronze medalist(s)

== Golf ==
Niue qualified eight players for the 2019 tournament:

Men

- Dustin Pulu
- Waimanu Pulu
- Toma Vakanidua
- Masiniholo Lagaloga

Women

- Coral Pasisi
- Micah Fuhiniu
- Haven Siosikefu
- Margaret Siosikefu

== Rugby league nines ==
Niue named fifteen players in their women's rugby league nines team for the 2019 games.

- Danielle Apain
- Katelyn Arona
- Santoria Faaofo
- Ana Hiku
- Morgan Ikihele
- Mary Makai
- Taimani Marshall
- Marina Misimake
- Kathleen Noble
- Jamie Patuki
- Shanice Rex
- Zion Seini
- Natalee Tagavaitau
- Litahina Tuialii
- Ikivaka-Malu Vilitam
