= Wallis and Futuna at the 2019 Pacific Games =

- Flags of Wallis and Futuna

8 July 2019 – 20 July 2019
- Competitors: in 5 sports
- Medals Ranked 15th: Gold 3 Silver 6 Bronze 2 Total 11

Pacific Games appearances
- 1966; 1969; 1971; 1975; 1979; 1983; 1987; 1991; 1995; 1999; 2003; 2007; 2011; 2015; 2019; 2023

Wallis and Futuna competed at the 2019 Pacific Games in Apia, Samoa from 7 to 20 July 2019. The country participated in five sports at the 2019 games.

== Athletics ==
Wallis and Futuna selected a team of 13 male athletes (and 3 coaches) to compete in athletics at the 2019 games:

Men

- Falemanu Aveuki: Para sport Javelin
- Victor Dabrion: Track
- Tony Falelavaki: Para sport Javelin
- Regis Kirsch: Track
- Sililo Kivalu: Decathlon
- Ma'alamalu Lakalaka: Decathlon
- Jean Mafoa Jr: Throwing events
- Stephen Louis Mailagi: Throwing events
- Boris Mauligalo: Track
- Soane Hea Munikiha'afata: Track
- Magoni Tauvale: Pole vault
- Felise Vahai Sosaia: Throwing events
- Selevasio Vala'o: Throwing events

== Outrigger canoeing ==
Wallis and Futuna selected 14 men and 12 women to compete in the Va'a events at the 2019 games.

Men

- Stéphane Goepfert
- Sosefo Ikauno
- Pierre Lakalaka
- Dickson Siakinuu
- Georges Simete
- Jean Sione
- Keleto Tauhola
- Paulo Tauhola
- Sesilio Toafatavao
- Jacky Tuakoifenua
- Sanualio Tuifua
- Petelo Tulitau
- Jean Tu'ulaki
- Sosefo Valefaka'aga

Women

- Lindsay Fiafialoto
- Veliteki Fiafialoto
- Asela Kolivai
- Ema Kulimoetoke
- Ingrid Malau
- Nefa Masei
- Fatima Muni
- Tupou Muni
- Alida Pressen
- Suliana Tulitau
- Lupe Ulutuipalelei
- Lifukava Ulutuipalelei

== Rugby sevens ==
Wallis and Futuna did not send a womens' rugby sevens team to the Pacific Games in 2019.

The men's sevens team competed in Pool A, playing against each other member of their pool: Fiji, Cook Islands, New Caledonia, and Nauru. Coach Sailosi Nawavu stressed the value of the experience the young team gained by participating.

Opponent	Date	Result	Score
Fiji	12 July	Loss	51–0
Nauru	12 July	Loss	26–12
New Caledonia	13 July	Loss	21–15
Cook Islands	13 July	Loss	26–7

== Volleyball ==
Wallis and Futuna selected 14 players in each of their men's and women's volleyball squads for the 2019 games.

Men's team

- Florian Asi
- Maleko Falematagia
- Petelo Kolokilagi
- Kani Laufoaulu
- Paino Moleana
- Akelausi Nau
- Josias Paino
- Esekiele Sekeme
- Boris Takaniko
- Talite'ofa Tiniloa
- Glenn Teuila Tuifua
- Vitali Tupou
- Sioli Tu'ufui
- Patrick Vanai

Women's team

- Martinaya Dornic
- Emelita Lauhea
- Gladys Pressense
- Alida Pressense
- Eusenia Sekeme
- Soana Sekeme
- Lita Tafilagi
- Tauhala Tafilagi
- Malia Tameha
- Gloria Taofifenua
- Finetoga Taofifenua
- Esperenza Tuafuna
- Siokivaka Tukumuli
- Emanuela Tupou
