= Australia at the 2019 Pacific Games =

- IOC code: AUS

8 July 2019 – 20 July 2019
- Competitors: 57 (21 men and 36 women) in 6 sports
- Flag bearer: Erika Yamasaki
- Medals Ranked 6th: Gold 33 Silver 9 Bronze 14 Total 56

Pacific Games appearances
- 2015; 2019; 2023

Australia competed at the 2019 Pacific Games in Apia, Samoa. A team of 42 athletes represented the country for Australia's second appearance at the Pacific Games. Australia competed in six sports.

== Athletics ==
Australia sent a team of six athletes (3 men, 3 women) to the 2019 games.^{a} They won five gold medals, setting five Pacific Games records.

=== Men ===
Track events

Athlete	Event	Heat		Final	
Athlete	Event	Result	Rank	Result	Rank
Steven Solomon	400 metres			45.62 GR	Gold medal
Ian Dewhurst	400 metres hurdles			50.86 GR	Gold medal

Field events

Athlete	Event	Final	
Athlete	Event	Distance	Rank
Emmanuel Fakiye	Triple jump	NM	—

=== Women ===
Track events

Athlete	Event	Heat		Final	
Athlete	Event	Result	Rank	Result	Rank
Keely Small	800 metres			2:10.53 GR	Gold medal
Brianna Beahan	100 metres hurdles			13.17 GR	Gold medal

Field events

Athlete	Event	Final	
Athlete	Event	Distance	Rank
Alexandra Hulley	Hammer throw	64.37 m GR	Gold medal

Notes

^ a Melissa Breen was selected to compete in the women's 100 metres and 200 metres events but had to withdraw from travelling with the team.

== Rugby sevens ==
Australia named 12 women in their squad to compete in rugby sevens at the 2019 games.

Women's team – Finalist (runner-up)

- Lauren Brown
- Rhiannon Byers
- Kennedy Cherrington
- Madison Ashby
- Eva Karpani
- Charlotte Kennington
- Page McGregor
- Yasmin Meakes
- Hagiga Mosby
- Faith Nathan
- Cassie Staples
- Jakiya Whitfeld

== Sailing ==
Australia named four sailors (2 men, 2 women) for the 2019 games.

Men

- Thomas Dawson – Laser:
- Will Sargent – Hobie cat, mixed pair: 4th place

Women

- Sarah Hoffman – Hobie cat, mixed pair: 4th place
- Paris Van Den Herik – Laser radial:

== Taekwondo ==
Australia sent fifteen athletes (7 men and 8 women) to compete in Taekwondo at the 2019 games, with each winning gold in their event.

Men

Athlete	Event	Quarterfinal	Semifinal	Final / BM	Rank
Athlete	Event	Opposition Result	Opposition Result	Opposition Result	Rank
Mackenzie Singleton	−54 kg				1st place, gold medalist(s)
Safwan Khalil	−58 kg				1st place, gold medalist(s)
Damon Cavey	−63 kg				1st place, gold medalist(s)
Thomas Afonczenko	−68 kg				1st place, gold medalist(s)
Leon Sejranovic	−74 kg				1st place, gold medalist(s)
Jack Marton	−80 kg				1st place, gold medalist(s)
Alan Salek	+87 kg				1st place, gold medalist(s)

Women

Athlete	Event	Quarterfinal	Semifinal	Final / BM	Rank
Athlete	Event	Opposition Result	Opposition Result	Opposition Result	Rank
Serena Stevens	−46 kg				1st place, gold medalist(s)
Tamzin Christoffel	−49 kg				1st place, gold medalist(s)
Yasmina Hibic	−53 kg				1st place, gold medalist(s)
Carmen Marton	−57 kg				1st place, gold medalist(s)
Rebecca Murray	−62 kg				1st place, gold medalist(s)
Ruth Hock	−67 kg				1st place, gold medalist(s)
Chelsea Hobday	−73 kg				1st place, gold medalist(s)
Reba Stewart	+73 kg				1st place, gold medalist(s)

== Volleyball ==
=== Beach volleyball ===
Men's pair – Final winners

- Tim Dickson
- Marcus Ferguson

Women's pair – Quarter-finalists: equal fifth place

- Britt Kendall
- Stef Weiler

== Weightlifting ==
=== Men ===
Athlete	Event	Snatch	Rank	Clean & Jerk	Rank	Total	Rank
Brandon Wakeling	73 kg	123	2nd place, silver medalist(s)	167	1st place, gold medalist(s)	290	1st place, gold medalist(s)
Boris Elesin	89 kg	142	2nd place, silver medalist(s)	166	2nd place, silver medalist(s)	338	2nd place, silver medalist(s)
Joel Gregson	89 kg	126	3rd place, bronze medalist(s)	162	3rd place, bronze medalist(s)	288	3rd place, bronze medalist(s)
Ridge Barredo	94 kg	139	4	175	4	314	4
Matthew Lydement	109 kg	156	2nd place, silver medalist(s)	175	6	331	4
Jackson Roberts-Young	109 kg	141	5	192	3rd place, bronze medalist(s)	333	3rd place, bronze medalist(s)

- Jake Douglas was selected for the 94 kg class but did not travel to the games due to injury.

=== Women ===
Athlete	Event	Snatch	Rank	Clean & Jerk	Rank	Total	Rank
Seen Lee	59 kg	78	3rd place, bronze medalist(s)	101	2nd place, silver medalist(s)	179	3rd place, bronze medalist(s)
Erika Yamasaki	59 kg	80	1st place, gold medalist(s)	103	1st place, gold medalist(s)	183	1st place, gold medalist(s)
Sarah Cochrane	64 kg	92	2nd place, silver medalist(s)	114	3rd place, bronze medalist(s)	204	2nd place, silver medalist(s)
Kiana Elliot	64 kg	99	1st place, gold medalist(s)	114	1st place, gold medalist(s)	213	1st place, gold medalist(s)
Ebony Gorincu	71 kg	91	1st place, gold medalist(s)	—	DNF	—	DNF
Stephanie Davies	76 kg	85	3rd place, bronze medalist(s)	111	2nd place, silver medalist(s)	196	3rd place, bronze medalist(s)
Kaity Fassina	87 kg	101	1st place, gold medalist(s)	119	1st place, gold medalist(s)	220	1st place, gold medalist(s)
Charisma Amoe-Tarrant	+ 87 kg	109	3rd place, bronze medalist(s)	137	4	246	4
