= Cook Islands at the 2019 Pacific Games =

8 July 2019 – 20 July 2019
- Competitors: in 15 sports

Pacific Games appearances
- 1963; 1966; 1969; 1971; 1975; 1979; 1983; 1987; 1991; 1995; 1999; 2003; 2007; 2011; 2015; 2019; 2023

Cook Islands competed at the 2019 Pacific Games in Apia, Samoa from 7 to 20 July 2019. The country participated in 15 sports at the 2019 games.

== Basketball ==
=== 5x5 ===
==== Men's basketball ====
- TBC

==== Women's basketball ====
- TBC

=== 3x3 ===
==== Men ====
- TBC

==== Women ====
- TBC

== Football ==
=== Men's football ===
Squad

TBC

=== Women's football ===
Squad

TBC

== Golf ==
Cook Islands nominated five men and seven women for the tournament in Samoa, with one and three respectively to be omitted. The men's and women's teams will each have four players participating in the 2019 games.

Men

- Royle Brogan
- Daniel Webb
- Kristopher Williamson
- Ned Howard
- James Herman

Women

- Memory Akama
- Rotana Howard
- Rowena Newbigging
- Katey Karati
- Margaret Teiti
- Matai Karati
- Moeroa Mamanu-Matheson

== Rugby league nines ==
=== Men's rugby league ===
- TBC

=== Women's rugby league ===
- TBC
