= Nauru at the 2019 Pacific Games =

8 July 2019 – 20 July 2019
- Competitors: in 8 sports

Pacific Games appearances
- 1963; 1966; 1969; 1971; 1975; 1979; 1983–1987; 1991; 1995; 1999; 2003; 2007; 2011; 2015; 2019; 2023

Nauru competed at the 2019 Pacific Games in Apia, Samoa from 7 to 20 July 2019. The country participated in eight sports at the 2019 games.

== Basketball ==
Nauru selected four players in each of their men's and women's 3x3 basketball teams to compete at the 2019 games.

=== Men's 3x3 ===
- Morrison Depaune
- Gaverick Mwareow
- Fallon Natano
- Rotui Star

=== Women's 3x3 ===
- Febony Detenamo
- Micheala Detenamo
- Janet Hubert
- Hanna Olsson

== Boxing ==
Nauru selected three male boxers to compete in boxing at the 2019 games.

Men

- Christon Amram
- Colan Caleb
- Yachen Cook

== Volleyball ==
=== Beach volleyball ===
Nauru selected a men's pair to compete in beach volleyball at the 2019 games.

Men

- Zumi Doguape
- Eodogi Dekarube
