= Tahiti at the 2019 Pacific Games =

- IOC code: TAH

8 July 2019 – 20 July 2019
- Competitors: in 21 sports
- Medals Ranked 4th: Gold 35 Silver 39 Bronze 45 Total 119

Pacific Games appearances
- 1963; 1966; 1969; 1971; 1975; 1979; 1983; 1987; 1991; 1995; 1999; 2003; 2007; 2011; 2015; 2019; 2023

French Polynesia competed as Tahiti at the 2019 Pacific Games in Apia, Samoa from 7 to 20 July 2019. The country participated in 21 sports at the 2019 games.

== Archery ==
Tahiti won a gold medal, a silver medal and two bronze medals, totalling to 4. They came 4th in the medal table behind the hosts Samoa. * Host nation (Samoa)

Rank	Nation	Gold	Silver	Bronze	Total
1	New Caledonia	4	4	4	12
2	Fiji	3	3	1	7
3	Samoa*	2	1	3	6
4	Tahiti	1	1	2	4
5	Tonga	0	1	0	1
Totals (5 entries)		10	10	10	30

Both their gold and silver medals came from the efforts of Jean-Pierre Winkelstroeter in the recurve men's full round and men's matchplay respectively, while their bronze medals came from Thiry Teng in the same events.

== Badminton ==
Tahiti qualified seven players in badminton for the 2019 games.

Men

- Rauhiri Goguenheim
- Manuarii Ly
- Remi Rossi

Women

- Heinamu Frogier
- Hinahere Mara
- Melissa Mi You
- Esther Tau

== Basketball ==
=== 5x5 ===
==== Men's basketball ====
- TBC

==== Women's basketball ====
- TBC

=== 3x3 ===
==== Men ====
- TBC

==== Women ====
- TBC

== Football ==
=== Men's football ===
Squad

TBC

=== Women's football ===
Squad

TBC

== Golf ==
Tahiti qualified eight players for the 2019 tournament:

Women

- Vaea Nauta
- Maggy Dury
- Flavia Reid-Amaru
- Moea Simon

Men

- Matahiapo Wohler
- Jeremy Biau
- Nicolas Changarnier
- Ari De Maeyer

== Rugby league nines ==
=== Men's rugby league ===
- TBC

=== Women's rugby league ===
- TBC

== Weightlifting ==
Tahiti selected nine athletes (six men and three women) in weightlifting at the 2019 games.

Men

- Joackim Ah Scha; -105 kg
- Mahei Oopa: -74 kg
- Marc Lisan: -83 kg
- Miguel Hopuetai: -93 kg
- Kevin Boukansan: -120 kg
- François Lanteres: + 120 kg

Women

- Heilani Sao Yao: -63 kg
- Vaitiare Sham Koua: -84 kg
- Sandra Pratz: -57 kg
