= American Samoa at the 2019 Pacific Games =

- Flag of American Samoa

in Apia, Samoa 8 July 2019 – 20 July 2019
- Competitors: in 16 sports
- Medals Ranked 18th: Gold 1 Silver 5 Bronze 7 Total 13

Pacific Games appearances
- 1963; 1966; 1969; 1971; 1975; 1979; 1983; 1987; 1991; 1995; 1999; 2003; 2007; 2011; 2015; 2019; 2023

American Samoa competed at the 2019 Pacific Games in Apia, Samoa from 7 to 20 July 2019. The country participated in 16 sports at the 2019 games.

== Basketball ==
=== 5x5 ===
==== Men's basketball ====
- TBC

==== Women's basketball ====
- TBC

=== 3x3 ===
==== Men ====
- TBC

==== Women ====
- TBC

== Football ==
=== Men's football ===
Squad

Head coach: Tunoa Lui

| No. | Pos. | Player | Date of birth (age) | Caps | Goals | Club |
|---|---|---|---|---|---|---|
| 1 | GK | Nicky Salapu | 13 September 1980 (aged 38) | 17 | 0 | (Football Federation American Samoa) PanSa East |
| 2 | MF | Takai Pouli | 18 July 2000 (aged 18) | 0 | 0 | (Football Federation American Samoa) Vaiala Tongan |
| 3 | DF | Jaiyah Saelua | 19 July 1988 (aged 30) | 11 | 0 | (Football Federation American Samoa) FC SKBC |
| 4 | DF | Ryan Samuelu | 19 February 1991 (aged 28) | 4 | 0 | (Football Federation American Samoa) Pago Youth |
| 5 | DF | Ueli Tualaulelei | 27 August 1999 (aged 19) | 0 | 0 | (Football Federation American Samoa) Pago Youth |
| 6 | MF | Kuresa Taga'i | 4 August 2000 (aged 18) | 0 | 0 | (Football Federation American Samoa) Ilaoa and To'omata |
| 7 | MF | Austin Kaleopa | 24 November 2001 (aged 17) | 0 | 0 | (Football Federation American Samoa) Utulei Youth |
| 8 | DF | Roy Ledoux | 26 June 2000 (aged 19) | 0 | 0 | (Football Federation American Samoa) Pago Youth |
| 9 | DF | Walter Pati | 31 March 2002 (aged 17) | 0 | 0 | (Football Federation American Samoa) Pago Youth |
| 10 | FW | MJ Faoa-Danielson | 13 April 2000 (aged 19) | 0 | 0 | (Football Federation American Samoa) Vaiala Tongan |
| 11 | MF | Milo Tiatia | 18 February 2002 (aged 17) | 0 | 0 | (Football Federation American Samoa) Royal Puma |
| 12 | MF | Mark Taga'i | 28 March 2002 (aged 17) | 0 | 0 | (Football Federation American Samoa) Ilaoa and To'omata |
| 13 | DF | Matthew Taga'i | 28 March 2002 (aged 17) | 0 | 0 | (Football Federation American Samoa) Ilaoa and To'omata |
| 14 | DF | Palauni Tapusoa | 1 February 1994 (aged 25) | 0 | 0 | (Football Federation American Samoa) Pago Youth |
| 15 | MF | Chris Fa'amoana | 2 August 2001 (aged 17) | 0 | 0 | (Football Federation American Samoa) Pago Youth |
| 16 | FW | Junior Teoni | | 0 | 0 | (Football Federation American Samoa) |
| 17 | FW | King Moe | | 0 | 0 | (Football Federation American Samoa) |
| 18 | MF | Puni Samuelu | 16 August 1996 (aged 22) | 0 | 0 | (Football Federation American Samoa) Pago Youth |
| 19 | DF | Tuaki Latu | 15 July 2000 (aged 18) | 0 | 0 | (Football Federation American Samoa) Vaiala Tongan |
| 20 | DF | Uasila'a Heleta | 27 February 1987 (aged 32) | 16 | 0 | (Football Federation American Samoa) Lion Heart |
| 23 | GK | Hengihengi Ikuvalu | 2 December 2002 (aged 16) | 0 | 0 | (Football Federation American Samoa) Pago Youth |

Group Play

| Pos | Team | Pld | W | D | L | GF | GA | GD | Pts | Qualification |
|---|---|---|---|---|---|---|---|---|---|---|
| 1 | New Caledonia | 5 | 5 | 0 | 0 | 22 | 0 | +22 | 15 | Gold Final |
| 2 | Fiji | 5 | 3 | 1 | 1 | 25 | 7 | +18 | 10 | Bronze Final |
| 3 | Tahiti | 5 | 3 | 0 | 2 | 19 | 6 | +13 | 9 | |
| 4 | Solomon Islands | 5 | 2 | 1 | 2 | 30 | 9 | +21 | 7 | |
| 5 | American Samoa | 5 | 0 | 1 | 4 | 2 | 36 | −34 | 1 | |
| 6 | Tuvalu | 5 | 0 | 1 | 4 | 2 | 42 | −40 | 1 | |

Source: Pacific Games
8 July 2019
9:00

| American Samoa | 0–5 | New Caledonia |
|---|---|---|
| | Report | Kaï 17', 38'; Saïko 59', 85'; Hmaen 10' |

J.S. Blatter Soccer Stadium #2, Apia
Attendance: 100
Referee: Joel Hopken (Vanuatu)

10 July 2019
10:00

| American Samoa | 0–9 | Fiji |
|---|---|---|
| | Report | Vodowaqa 20', 24', 50', 82'; Rakula 36', 49'; Wasasala 46', 84'; Hughes 89' |

J.S. Blatter Soccer Stadium #1, Apia
Attendance: 250
Referee: Nazmi Nasaruddin (Malaysia)

12 July 2019
9:00

| American Samoa | 1–1 | Tuvalu |
|---|---|---|
| Pati 70' | Report | Petoa 31' |

J.S. Blatter Soccer Stadium #2, Apia
Attendance: 100
Referee: Pari Oito (Tahiti)

15 July 2019
16:00

| Solomon Islands | 13–0 | American Samoa |
|---|---|---|
| Abba 49', 54', 60', 84'; Feni 18', 34', 61'; Ifunaoa 51', 62', 74'; Ledoux 27' (o.g.); Totori 42'; Taroga 69' | Report |

J.S. Blatter Soccer Stadium #1, Apia
Attendance: 400
Referee: David Yareboinen (Papua New Guinea)

18 July 2019
13:00

| Tahiti | 8–1 | American Samoa |
|---|---|---|
| T. Tehau 4', 39', 76' (pen.); Tetauira 10', 15', 85'; Roo 26'; Mu 84' | Report | Fa'amoana 35' |

J.S. Blatter Soccer Stadium #1, Apia
Attendance: 140
Referee: Joel Hopken (Vanuatu)

=== Women's football ===
Squad

TBC

== Golf ==
American Samoa qualified eight players for the 2019 tournament:

Women

- Margaret Gadalla
- Amelie Chen
- Kimberly Tolmie-Brewster
- Moeroa Hardman

Men

- Alfred Hollister
- Polo Fruean Jr
- Tuli Fruean
- Pemerika Gillet
