= Vanuatu at the 2019 Pacific Games =

8 July 2019 – 20 July 2019
- Competitors: in 14 sports

Pacific Games appearances
- 1983; 1987; 1991; 1995; 1999; 2003; 2007; 2011; 2015; 2019; 2023

Vanuatu competed at the 2019 Pacific Games in Apia, Samoa from 7 to 20 July 2019. The country participated in fourteen sports at the 2019 games.

== Basketball ==
=== 5x5 ===
==== Men's basketball ====
- TBC

==== Women's basketball ====
- TBC

=== 3x3 ===
==== Men ====
- TBC

==== Women ====
- TBC

== Football ==
=== Men's football ===
Squad

TBC

=== Women's football ===
Squad

TBC

== Golf ==
Vanuatu qualified five players for the 2019 tournament:

Men

- Daniel Mansale
- Josepho Matauatu
- Guillaume Bernier
- Anthony Nabanga

Women

- Ata Mansale
