= Kiribati at the 2019 Pacific Games =

- IOC code: KIR

8 July 2019 – 20 July 2019
- Competitors: in 12 sports
- Medals: Gold 0 Silver 0 Bronze 0 Total 0

Pacific Games appearances
- 1979; 1983–1995; 1999; 2003; 2007; 2011; 2015; 2019; 2023

Kiribati competed at the 2019 Pacific Games in Apia, Samoa from 7 to 20 July 2019. The country participated in twelve sports at the 2019 games.

== Badminton ==
Kiribati qualified two men and two women in badminton for the 2019 games.

Men

- Timwata Kabaua
- Tooma Teuaika

Women

- Tinabora Tekeiaki
- Teitiria Utimawa

== Basketball ==
=== 5x5 ===
==== Men's basketball ====
- TBC

==== Women's basketball ====
- TBC

=== 3x3 ===
==== Men ====
- TBC

==== Women ====
- TBC

== Powerlifting ==
In powerlifting, Kiribati won four medals, one silver and three bronze. Nantei Nikora won silver in the men's under 66kg category. His country mates Tibaa Taabureia (men's under 59kg category) and Kaoma Taake (men's under 74kg category) both won bronze. Junior Erisabeth Kirata also won bronze in the women's under 72kg category, scoring the Kiribati women's powerlifting team its only medal at the games.

== Taekwondo ==
In Taekwondo, Kiribati won four medals, one silver and three bronze. Nakibwae Kanimisu won the team their only silver medal by coming in second for the men's under 68kg category. Betaroni Tiaontin (men's under 54kg) and Malua Tongatapu Puti (men's under 74kg) both won bronze. The men's team came in overall third, winning the team their third bronze medal in Taekwondo at the 2019 games. The Kiribati women's team did not win any medals.
