= Guam at the 2019 Pacific Games =

- IOC code: GUM

8 July 2019 – 20 July 2019
- Competitors: in 11 sports
- Medals: Gold 0 Silver 0 Bronze 0 Total 0

Pacific Games appearances
- 1966; 1969; 1971; 1975; 1979; 1983; 1987; 1991; 1995; 1999; 2003; 2007; 2011; 2015; 2019; 2023

Guam competed at the 2019 Pacific Games in Apia, Samoa from 7 to 20 July 2019. A team of 150 athletes and staff was sent to represent the territory in eleven disciplines at the games.

== Athletics ==
Guam's athletics team was twelve strong and included two Olympians, Derek Mandell and Regine Tugade.

Men

- Paul Dimalanta: 100 m, 200 m, Long jump.
- Derek Mandell: 1500 m, 5000 m, Half-marathon.
- Benjamin Middlebrooke: 5000 m, 10,000 m, Half-marathon.
- Bleu Perez: 100 m, 200 m.

Women

- Noshista Benavente: 5000 m, 10,000 m.
- Alison Bowman: 800 m, 1500 m, 3000 m steeple chase.
- Genina Criss: 800 m, 1500 m.
- Genie Gerardo: Shotput, Discus, Hammer throw, Javelin.
- Madison Packbier: 200 m, 400 m, 800 m.
- Emma Sheedy: 400 m, 1500 m.
- Regine Tugade: 100 m, 200 m, Long jump.
- Richelle Tugade: 100 m, 100m hurdles, 400m hurdles.

== Basketball ==
=== Men's basketball ===
Nine players were selected in Guam's squad for men's basketball to defend the Pacific Games title won in 2015. JP Cruz, gold medal-winner as a member of that team, returned in 2019 and also played in the four-man squad for the 3x3 tournament.

- William Belger
- Tomas Calvo
- JP Cruz
- Earvin Rose
- Takumi Simon
- William Stinnett (c)
- Mekeli Wesley
- Russell Wesley
- Tai Wesley

Coach: EJ Calvo

=== Women's basketball ===
Guam named 15 players in its women's team for the 2019 games:

- Brianna Benito
- Alexandra Carbullido
- Destiny Castro
- Kathryn Castro
- Kara Duenas
- Monica Giger
- Maria Mesa Nauls
- Chloe Miranda
- Joylyn Pangilinan
- Jocelyn Pardilla
- Elysia Perez
- Janniliese Quintanilla
- Mia San Nicolas
- Derin Santos

Head coach: Paul Pineda

=== 3x3 basketball ===
Guam selected eight players (four male and four female) to compete in 3x3 at the 2019 games:

Men – Final winners

- Ben Borja
- AJ Carlos
- Michael Sakazaki
- Seve Susuico (c)

Women

- Kali Benavente
- Destiny Castro
- Joylyn Pangilinan
- Mia San Nicolas

== Golf ==
Guam qualified eight players for the tournament in Samoa, but one member of the women's team dropped out. Seven Guam players participated in the 2019 games.

Men

- Roberto Manalo
- John Muna
- Eduardo Terlaje
- Ricardo Terlaje

Women

- Teresita Blair
- Kristin Oberiano
- Emiri Satake
- Anna-Rose Tarpley

Non-playing captain: Daryl Poe

== Outrigger canoeing ==
Guam sent 23 athletes and two coaches to contest the various Va'a events men's and women's outrigger canoeing at the 2019 games.

Men's team

- John Aguon
- Jesse Cabrera
- Klyde Castro
- Collin Murphy
- Joseph Nowell
- Johnny Palomo
- Shane Palomo
- John Sablan
- Christopher Salas
- Matthew Savares
- Tony Vivas

Coach: David Palomo Jr

Women's team

- Ruby Castro
- Isabel Gutierrez
- Jenynne Guzman
- Jennifer Horeg
- Sue Lee
- Kai Perez
- Kiara Quichocho
- Misako Sablan
- Michele Salas
- Ashley Taitano
- Miriam Terlaje
- Diane Vice

Coach: Josh Duenas

== Swimming ==
Six swimmers represented Guam at Samoa 2019:

Men

- Sebastian Castro
- Chrios Duenas
- Mark Imazu
- Benji Schulte
- Jagger Stephens

Women

- Mineri Gomez

Coaches: Ed Ching and Don San Agustin

== Taekwondo ==
Three men and two women competed for Guam in Taekwondo:

Men

- Alexander Allen
- Joseph Ho
- Leon Ho

Women

- Tierra-Lynn Chargualaf
- Amber Toves

Coaches: Mike Ho and Ronald Cook

== Tennis ==
The Guam Tennis Federation selected four male tennis players for the 2019 games in Samoa:

Men

- Mason Caldwell
- Camden Camacho
- Danny Llarenas
- Derek Okuhama

== Volleyball ==
=== Men's beach volleyball ===
Guam qualified one men's pair for beach volleyball:

- Zakhary Zacarias
- Brian Tsujii

=== Women's volleyball (indoor) ===
Guam selected ten players for their women's volleyball team:

- Joie Blas
- Adriana Chang
- Edeline Cruz
- Hilary Diaz (c)
- Samara Duenas
- Mariana Kier
- Austia Mendiola
- Lori Okada
- Jestyne Sablan
- Tatiana Sablan

== Weightlifting ==
Guam selected six athletes to compete in weightlifting at the 2019 games.

Men

- David Bautista, −73 kg

Women

- Armie Almazan, −64 kg
- Dayalani Calma, −45 kg
- Dayamaya Calma, −49 kg
- Dayanara Calma, −59 kg
- Jacinta Sumagaysay, −55 kg

Coach: Edgar Molinos
