= Solomon Islands at the 2019 Pacific Games =

8 July 2019 – 20 July 2019
- Competitors: in 22 sports

Pacific Games appearances
- 1963; 1966; 1969; 1971; 1975; 1979; 1983; 1987; 1991; 1995; 1999; 2003; 2007; 2011; 2015; 2019; 2023

Solomon Islands competed at the 2019 Pacific Games in Apia, Samoa from 7 to 20 July 2019. The country participated in 22 sports at the 2019 games. With Honiara as the host of the 2023 Pacific Games, the Solomon segment is expected to be performed at the closing ceremony.

== Basketball ==
=== 5x5 ===
==== Men's basketball ====
- TBC

==== Women's basketball ====
- TBC

=== 3x3 ===
==== Men ====
- TBC

==== Women ====
- TBC

== Football ==
=== Men's football ===
Squad

TBC

=== Women's football ===
Squad

TBC

== Golf ==
Solomon Islands nominated nine men and seven women for the tournament in Samoa, with five and three respectively to be omitted. The men's and women's teams will each have four players participating in the 2019 games.

Men

- Alick Dalo
- George Rubako
- Wesley Sifaka
- Sai Dalo
- Harrison Stewart
- Paul Foeadi
- Ben Felani
- Thomas Felani
- Tonny Ramo

Women

- Ravatu Tabe
- Norma Wopereis
- Doreen Sam
- Everlyn Maelasi
- Ronica Tyson
- Siru Hickie
- Marcella Qilabari

== Rugby league nines ==
=== Men's rugby league ===
- TBC

=== Women's rugby league ===
- TBC
