= Tonga at the 2019 Pacific Games =

- IOC code: TGA

8 July 2019 – 20 July 2019
- Competitors: in 22 sports

Pacific Games appearances
- 1963; 1966; 1969; 1971; 1975; 1979; 1983; 1987; 1991; 1995; 1999; 2003; 2007; 2011; 2015; 2019; 2023

Tonga competed at the 2019 Pacific Games in Apia, Samoa from 7 to 20 July 2019. The country participated in 22 sports at the 2019 games.

== Badminton ==
Tonga qualified eight players in Badminton for the 2019 Games.

Women

- Siosaia Fonua
- Lauti Naaniumotu
- Renaey Naaniumotu
- Taniela Ngaue

Women

- Lata Isitolo
- Mele Kei
- Litea Tatafu
- Lesieli Vaeno

== Basketball ==
=== 5x5 ===
==== Men's basketball ====
- TBC

==== Women's basketball ====
- TBC

=== 3x3 ===
==== Men ====
- TBC

==== Women ====
- TBC

== Football ==
=== Men's football ===
Squad

TBC

=== Women's football ===
Squad

TBC

== Golf ==
Tonga nominated ten men and five women for the tournament in Samoa, with six and one respectively to be omitted. The men's and women's teams will each have four players participating in the 2019 games.

Women

- Losa Fapiano
- Elina Raass
- Joyce Tuivakano
- Losetapieta Fapiano
- Etivise Latu

Men

- Afa Vasi
- Tasisio Lolesio
- Mosese Fiefia
- Mekinoti Mausia
- Kalolo Fifita
- Viliami Mahanga
- Alani Piukala
- David Fonua
- Moses Alipate
- Siaosi Siakumi

== Rugby league nines ==
=== Men's rugby league ===
- TBC

=== Women's rugby league ===
- TBC
