= Fiji at the 2019 Pacific Games =

Pacific game

- IOC code: FIJ

8 July 2019 – 20 July 2019
- Competitors: in 24 sports
- Medals: Gold 0 Silver 0 Bronze 0 Total 0

Pacific Games appearances
- 1963; 1966; 1969; 1971; 1975; 1979; 1983; 1987; 1991; 1995; 1999; 2003; 2007; 2011; 2015; 2019; 2023

Fiji competed at the 2019 Pacific Games in Apia, Samoa from 7 to 20 July 2019. The country participated in 24 sports at the 2019 games. Team Fiji will not be represented in volleyball or beach volleyball.

== Athletics ==
=== Men's athletics ===
Track and road events

Athlete	Event	Heat		Semifinal		Final	
Athlete	Event	Result	Rank	Result	Rank	Result	Rank
	100 metres						
	200 metres						
	400 metres						
	800 metres						
	1500 metres	—N/a					
	5000 metres	—N/a					
	10,000 metres	—N/a					
	Half marathon	—N/a					
	110 metres hurdles	—N/a					
	400 metres hurdles			—N/a			
	3000 metres steeplechase	—N/a					
	4×100 metre relay	—N/a					
	4×400 metre relay	—N/a					
	100 metres ambulant						

Field events

Athlete	Event	Final	
Athlete	Event	Distance	Position
	High jump		
	Pole vault		
	Long jump		
	Triple jump		
	Shot put		
	Discus throw		
	Hammer throw		
	Javelin throw		
	Shot put secured		

Combined events – Decathlon

Athlete	Event	100 m	LJ	SP	HJ	400 m	110H	DT	PV	JT	1500 m	Final	Rank
	Result												
	Points												

=== Women's athletics ===
Track and road events

Athlete	Event	Heat		Semifinal		Final	
Athlete	Event	Result	Rank	Result	Rank	Result	Rank
	100 metres						
	200 metres						
	400 metres						
	800 metres						
	1500 metres	—N/a					
	5000 metres	—N/a					
	10,000 metres	—N/a					
	Half marathon	—N/a					
	110 metres hurdles	—N/a					
	400 metres hurdles			—N/a			
	3000 metres steeplechase	—N/a					
	4×100 metre relay	—N/a					
	4×400 metre relay	—N/a					

Field events

Athlete	Event	Final	
Athlete	Event	Distance	Position
	High jump		
	Pole vault		
	Long jump		
	Triple jump		
	Shot put		
	Discus throw		
	Javelin		
	Hammer throw		

Combined events – Heptathlon

Athlete	Event	100H	LJ	SP	200 m	HJ	JT	800 m	Final	Rank
	Result									
	Points									

== Badminton ==
Fiji qualified five players in Badminton for the 2019 games.

Men

- Burty Molia

Women

- Karyn Gibson
- Andra Whiteside
- Danielle Whiteside
- Ashley Yee

== Basketball ==
=== 5x5 ===
==== Men's basketball ====
- TBC

==== Women's basketball ====
- TBC

=== 3x3 basketball ===
Fiji selected eight players (four male and four female) to compete in 3x3 at the 2019 games:

Men

- Henry Tabuduka
- Filimone Waqabaca
- Joshua Motufaga
- Marques Whippy

Women

- Mickaelar Mendez
- Bulou Koyamainavure
- Letava Whippy
- Vilisi Tavui

== Football ==
=== Men's football ===
Squad

Head coach: (France) Christophe Gamel

No.	Pos.	Player	Date of birth (age)	Caps	Goals	Club
1	GK	Simione Tamanisau	5 June 1982 (aged 37)	37	0	(Fiji Football Association) Suva
3	DF	Kavaia Rawaqa	20 September 1990 (aged 28)	17	0	(Fiji Football Association) Lautoka
5	DF	Remueru Tekiate	7 August 1990 (aged 28)	22	0	(Fiji Football Association) Suva
6	MF	Zibraaz Sahib	9 September 1989 (aged 29)	11	0	(Fiji Football Association) Lautoka
7	DF	Dave Radrigai	15 March 1990 (aged 29)	20	2	(Fiji Football Association) Lautoka
8	MF	Setareki Hughes	8 June 1995 (aged 24)	17	0	(Fiji Football Association) Rewa
9	FW	Roy Krishna	30 August 1987 (aged 31)	36	23	(All India Football Federation) ATK
10	DF	Nicholas Prasad	7 December 1995 (aged 23)	4	0	(German Football Association) SpVgg Bayreuth
11	FW	Tito Vodowaqa	9 April 1999 (aged 20)	1	0	(Fiji Football Association) Nadi
12	MF	Kishan Sami	13 March 2000 (aged 19)	8	0	(Fiji Football Association) Ba
13	MF	Malakai Rakula	16 May 1992 (aged 27)	3	0	(Fiji Football Association) Ba
14	FW	Samuela Drudru	30 April 1989 (aged 30)	9	2	(Fiji Football Association) Lautoka
15	DF	Ame Votoniu	12 August 1985 (aged 33)	11	1	(Fiji Football Association) Nadi
16	MF	Isikeli Ratucava	6 November 1998 (aged 20)	0	0	(Fiji Football Association) Nasinu
17	MF	Patrick Joseph	3 May 1998 (aged 21)	2	0	(Fiji Football Association) Nadi
18	DF	Laisenia Raura (Captain)	14 October 1990 (aged 28)	19	0	(Fiji Football Association) Suva
19	MF	Peni Tuigulagula	8 March 1999 (aged 20)	2	0	(Fiji Football Association) Nadi
20	DF	Savenaca Baledrokadroka	20 May 1999 (aged 20)	2	0	(Fiji Football Association) Nasinu
21	MF	Christopher Wasasala	31 December 1994 (aged 24)	15	5	(Fiji Football Association) Suva
22	GK	Beniamino Mateinaqara	19 August 1987 (aged 31)	19	0	(Fiji Football Association) Lautoka
23	FW	Rusiate Matarerega	17 January 1993 (aged 26)	14	3	(Fiji Football Association) Nadi

=== Women's football ===
Squad

TBC

== Golf ==
Fiji qualified eight players for the 2019 tournament:

Men

- Abid Hussain
- Asish Chand
- Baarroon Hussain
- Olaf Allen

Women

- Dawi Jee
- Emi Subam
- Merelita McCarthy
- Raina Kumar

== Outrigger canoeing ==
V6 500m men ( Sliver Medalist )

- Tomasi Andrea
- Apisai Kalou
- Willie Naiqasima
- Andrew Peters
- Johji Wong
- Clayton Horsefall

V6 marathon ( Bronze Medalist )

- Tomasi Andrea
- John Semisi
- Andrew Peters
- Willie Naiqasima
- Johji Wong
- Clayton Horsefall

== Rugby league nines ==
=== Men's rugby league ===
- TBC

=== Women's rugby league ===
- TBC

== Swimming ==
Fiji Swimming announced eleven swimmers had qualified for the 2019 games:

Men

- Herbert Rabua
- Taichi Vakasama
- Netani Ross
- Temafa Yalimaiwai
- Hansel Makei
- Hefu Erasito
- Jeremiah Faktoufon

Women

- Moana Wines
- Matelita Baudromo
- Rosemary Rova
- Maryanne Kotobalavu

== Taekwondo ==
The Fiji Taekwondo Association announced a team of seven (with a further spot yet to be filled) for the 2019 games:

Men

- Sakiusa Tuva
- Pranit Kumar
- Josefa Otterbech
- Apisai Baleloa
- Kitione Mua

Women

- Anegha Narayan
- Mikari Tekairaba
