= Papua New Guinea at the 2019 Pacific Games =

- IOC code: PNG
- National federation: Papua New Guinea Olympic Committee

8 July 2019 – 20 July 2019
- Competitors: 372 (190 men and 182 women) in 23 sports
- Flag bearer: Abigail Tere-Apisah
- Officials: Emma Waiwai (chef de mission)
- Medals Ranked 2nd: Gold 38 Silver 57 Bronze 35 Total 130

Pacific Games appearances
- 1963; 1966; 1969; 1971; 1975; 1979; 1983; 1987; 1991; 1995; 1999; 2003; 2007; 2011; 2015; 2019; 2023

Papua New Guinea competed at the 2019 Pacific Games in Apia, Samoa from 7 to 20 July 2019. Team PNG participated in 23 out of the 26 sports on offer at the 2019 games.

== Archery ==
Four archers were confirmed on the PNG team on 17 June 2019.

=== Men ===
Athlete	Event	Ranking round		Round of 64	Round of 32	Round of 16	Quarterfinals	Semifinals	Final / BM	
Athlete	Event	Score	Seed	Opposition Score	Opposition Score	Opposition Score	Opposition Score	Opposition Score	Opposition Score	Rank
Sereugava Ugava				–	–	–	–	–	–	
Dikana Ugava			–	–	–	–	–	–		

=== Women ===
Athlete	Event	Ranking round		Round of 64	Round of 32	Round of 16	Quarterfinals	Semifinals	Final / BM	
Athlete	Event	Score	Seed	Opposition Score	Opposition Score	Opposition Score	Opposition Score	Opposition Score	Opposition Score	Rank
Susanne Sere				–	–	–	–	–	–	
Korima Hafmans-Nendepa				–	–	–	–	–	–	

== Athletics ==
Papua New Guinea listed 48 athletes in track and field as of 21 May 2019 (including 3 parasport athletes).

=== Men ===
Track and road events

Athlete	Event	Heat		Semifinal		Final	
Athlete	Event	Result	Rank	Result	Rank	Result	Rank
Thoa Ora	100 metres	11.07	3 q	10.95	7	Did not advance	
Michael Penny	100 metres	11.05	3 q	10.88	3 Q	10.84	6
Theo Piniau	100 metres	11.12	1 Q	10.87	5 q	10.85	7
Theo Piniau	200 metres	21.98	2 Q	21.71	2 Q	21.70	3rd place, bronze medalist(s)
Shadrick Tansi	200 metres	21.37	1 Q	21.39	2 Q	21.80	4
Emmanuel Wanga	200 metres	21.64	2 Q	22.01	4 q	22.14	8
Benjamin Aliel	400 metres	47.82	1 Q	—N/a		47.63	3rd place, bronze medalist(s)
Daniel Baul	400 metres	48.48	1 Q	—N/a		47.31	2nd place, silver medalist(s)
Shadrick Tansi	400 metres	48.00	2 Q	—N/a		47.91	4
Messach Fred	800 metres	1:58.74	1 Q	—N/a		1:56.65	5
Ephraim Lerkin	800 metres	1:57.55	2 Q	—N/a		1:53.78	2nd place, silver medalist(s)
Kaminiel Matlaun	800 metres	1:57.93	2 Q	—N/a		1:55.75	4
Messach Fred	1500 metres	—N/a				4:06.09	2nd place, silver medalist(s)
Andipas Georasi	1500 metres	—N/a				4:10.92	7
George Yamak	1500 metres	—N/a				4:09.98	5
James Gundu	5000 metres	—N/a				15:57.00	3rd place, bronze medalist(s)
Siune Kagl	5000 metres	—N/a				16:06.44	4
Simbai Kaspar	5000 metres	—N/a				16:18.87	5
James Gundu	10,000 metres	—N/a				33.39.01	3rd place, bronze medalist(s)
Siune Kagl	10,000 metres	—N/a				33:36.86	2nd place, silver medalist(s)
Simbai Kaspar	10,000 metres	—N/a				33:34.90	1st place, gold medalist(s)
Siune Kagl	Half marathon	—N/a				DNF	—N/a
Simbai Kaspar	Half marathon	—N/a				DNF	—N/a
Sapolai Yao	Half marathon	—N/a				DNF	—N/a
Mowen Boino	110 metres hurdles	DNF	—N/a	—N/a		Did not advance	
Cletus Mosi	110 metres hurdles	15.16	3 Q	—N/a		14.99	4
Daniel Baul	400 metres hurdles	53.92	1 Q	—N/a		51.80	2nd place, silver medalist(s)
Mowen Boino	400 metres hurdles	55.23	5 q	—N/a		DNS	—N/a
Ephraim Lerkin	400 metres hurdles	53.93	2 Q	—N/a		52.82	3rd place, bronze medalist(s)
Andipas Georasi	3000 metres steeplechase	—N/a				10:16.44	3rd place, bronze medalist(s)
Simbai Kaspar	3000 metres steeplechase	—N/a				9:37.14	1st place, gold medalist(s)
Sapolai Yao	3000 metres steeplechase	—N/a				10:14.17	2nd place, silver medalist(s)
Linus Kuravi; Thoa Ora; Manila John; Michael Penny	4×100 metre relay	—N/a				41.34	3rd place, bronze medalist(s)
Benjamin Aliel; Emmanuel Wanga; Shadrick Tansi; Daniel Baul	4×400 metre relay	—N/a				3:13.06	1st place, gold medalist(s)
Steven Abraham (T46)	100 metres ambulant	11.64	1 Q	—N/a		11.78	2nd place, silver medalist(s)
Elias Larry (T47)	100 metres ambulant	13.67	3 Q	—N/a		14.14	4

Field events

Athlete	Event	Final	
Athlete	Event	Distance	Position
Roland Hure	High jump	1.93m	5
Roland Hure	Long jump	6.80m	5
Peniel Richard	High jump	1.99m	2nd place, silver medalist(s)
Peniel Richard	Long jump	7.01m	3rd place, bronze medalist(s)
Peniel Richard	Triple jump	15.51m	2nd place, silver medalist(s)
Eldon Toti	High jump	1.90m	6
Eldon Toti	Long jump	6.97m	4
Eldon Toti	Triple jump	12.51m	7
Debono Paraka	Discus throw	45.70m	4
Debono Paraka	Hammer throw	36.57m	3rd place, bronze medalist(s)
Lakona Gerega	Javelin throw	52.72m	3rd place, bronze medalist(s)
Morea Mararos (F34)	Javelin throw Ambulant	21.03m	9

Combined events – Decathlon

Athlete	Event	100 m	LJ	SP	HJ	400 m	110H	DT	PV	JT	1500 m	Final	Rank
Karo Iga	Result	11.00	7.10m	10.09m	1.91m	50.04	16.12	28.73m	4.00m	47.81m	4:55.58	6,643	2nd place, silver medalist(s)
Karo Iga	Points	861	838	491	723	813	719	440	617	556	585	6,643	2nd place, silver medalist(s)
Cletus Mosi	Result	11.32	6.97m	10.47m	1.70m	53.17	15.33	34.00m	2.80m	54.68m	5:04.74	6,184	4
Cletus Mosi	Points	791	807	514	544	674	810	544	309	658	533	6,184	4

=== Women ===
Track and road events

Athlete	Event	Heat		Semifinal		Final	
Athlete	Event	Result	Rank	Result	Rank	Result	Rank
Leonie Beu	100 metres	11.95	1 Q	—N/a		11.94	3rd place, bronze medalist(s)
Adrine Monagi	100 metres	12.28	3 q	—N/a		12.50	8
Toea Wisil	100 metres	11.50	1 Q	—N/a		11.56	1st place, gold medalist(s)
Isila Apkup	200 metres	25.44	3 q	—N/a		25.45	5
Leonie Beu	200 metres	24.77	1 Q	—N/a		24.40	3rd place, bronze medalist(s)
Toea Wisil	200 metres	23.78	1 Q	—N/a		23.45	1st place, gold medalist(s)
Leonie Beu	400 metres	56.61	1 Q	—N/a		55.71	2nd place, silver medalist(s)
Donna Koniel	400 metres	57.08	2 Q	—N/a		57.08	5
Toea Wisil	400 metres	56.30	1 Q	—N/a		53.90	1st place, gold medalist(s)
Jenny Albert	800 metres	—N/a				2:16.30	3rd place, bronze medalist(s)
Donna Koniel	800 metres	—N/a				2:14.17	2nd place, silver medalist(s)
Lyanne Tibu	800 metres	—N/a				DQ	—N/a
Jenny Albert	1500 metres	—N/a				4:56.61	4
Poro Gahekave	1500 metres	—N/a				4:42.04	1st place, gold medalist(s)
Lyanne Tibu	1500 metres	—N/a				4:52.04	3rd place, bronze medalist(s)
Poro Gahekave	5000 metres	—N/a				18:27.46	1st place, gold medalist(s)
Monica Kalua	5000 metres	—N/a				19:55.37	5
Mary Tenge	5000 metres	—N/a				19:14.50	2nd place, silver medalist(s)
Monica Kalua	10,000 metres	—N/a				44:42.58	5
Mary Tenge	10,000 metres	—N/a				DNF	—N/a
Adrine Monagi	110 metres hurdles	—N/a				13.99	2nd place, silver medalist(s)
Raylyne Kanam	400 metres hurdles	—N/a				1:05.38	4
Donna Koniel	400 metres hurdles	—N/a				1:00.14	1st place, gold medalist(s)
Annie Topal	400 metres hurdles	—N/a				1:02.39	3rd place, bronze medalist(s)
Poro Gahekave	3000 metres steeplechase	—N/a				11:38.42	1st place, gold medalist(s)
Mary Tenge	3000 metres steeplechase	—N/a				11:59.25	2nd place, silver medalist(s)
Adrine Monagi; Leonie Beu; Nancy Malamut; Toea Wisil	4×100 metre relay	—N/a				45.97	2nd place, silver medalist(s)
Leonie Beu; Isila Apkup; Donna Koniel; Toea Wisil	4×400 metre relay	—N/a				3:44.86	1st place, gold medalist(s)

Field events

Athlete	Event	Final	
Athlete	Event	Distance	Position
Rellie Kaputin	High jump	1.65m	2nd place, silver medalist(s)
Rellie Kaputin	Long jump	6.15m	1st place, gold medalist(s)
Rellie Kaputin	Triple jump	12.44m	2nd place, silver medalist(s)
Annie Topal	Long jump	5.68m	2nd place, silver medalist(s)
Annie Topal	Triple jump	12.91m	1st place, gold medalist(s)
Jacklyn Travertz	Hammer throw	47.99m	3rd place, bronze medalist(s)
Sharon Toako	Discus throw	33.62m	8
Sharon Toako	Javelin throw	47.13m	1st place, gold medalist(s)

Combined events – Heptathlon

Athlete	Event	100H	HJ	SP	200 m	LJ	JT	800 m	Final	Rank
Edna Boafob	Result	16.62	1.38m	9.13m	26.08	4.52m	25.33m	2:35.00	3,848	3rd place, bronze medalist(s)
Edna Boafob	Points	640	491	473	790	433	389	632	3,848	3rd place, bronze medalist(s)
Raylyne Kanam	Result	15.69	1.38m	7.67m	26.97	5.02m	31.77m	2:30.26	4,101	2nd place, silver medalist(s)
Raylyne Kanam	Points	753	491	378	714	565	510	690	4,101	2nd place, silver medalist(s)

== Basketball ==
The Basketball Federation of Papua New Guinea (BFPNG) announced all four squads on 23 June 2019 .

=== Basketball (5x5) ===
Papua New Guinea qualified both the men's and women's national teams (12 athletes per team) after a top place finish at the 2017 FIBA Melanesia Basketball Cup in Port Moresby.

Men's tournament
Roster

Papua New Guinea men's national basketball team – 2019 Pacific Games roster
Players
Coaches

Pos.	No.	Name	Age – Date of birth	Height	Club	Ctr.
G	1	Anderson Hewe	20 – 12 August 1998	1.6 m (5 ft 3 in)	Exodus	(Papua New Guinea)
G	3	Cornelius Muri	18 – 1 March 2001	1.81 m (5 ft 11 in)	KSS Flames	(Papua New Guinea)
G	4	Lloyd Wright	22 – 18 April 1997	1.99 m (6 ft 6 in)	Hope International University	(United States)
G	5	Liam Wright	20 – 6 March 1999	1.88 m (6 ft 2 in)	Northeast Bushrangers	(Australia)
G	7	Moses Apiko	26 – 12 February 1993	1.84 m (6 ft 0 in)	KSS Flames	(Papua New Guinea)
F	9	Aron Farmer	22 – 21 May 1997	1.97 m (6 ft 6 in)	Cairns Marlins	(Australia)
C	10	James Banduru Jnr	22 – 9 February 1997	2.05 m (6 ft 9 in)	Moniplus	(Papua New Guinea)
F	11	Robert Kave	30 – 9 May 1989	1.91 m (6 ft 3 in)	Moniplus	(Papua New Guinea)
F	13	Matineng Leahy	22 – 9 March 1997	2.00 m (6 ft 7 in)	Ipswich Force	(Australia)
F	14	Charles Parapa	33 – 20 April 1986	1.88 m (6 ft 2 in)	KSS Flames	(Papua New Guinea)
F	15	Apia Muri	31 – 14 May 1988	1.90 m (6 ft 3 in)	Moniplus	(Papua New Guinea)

Head coach

- (Australia) Joel Khalu

Legend

- (C) Team captain
- Club – describes last
  club before the tournament
- Age – describes age
  on 7 July 2019

Tournament summary

Event	Team	Preliminary round				Qualifying finals	Semifinals	Final / GM	
Event	Team	Opposition Score	Opposition Score	Opposition Score	Rank	Opposition Score	Opposition Score	Opposition Score	Rank
Men's	Papua New Guinea	Solomon Islands; W 86–48	Tahiti; W 93–51	Fiji; L 58–78	2	Samoa –	–	–	

Women's tournament
Roster

Papua New Guinea Women's national basketball team – 2019 Pacific Games roster
Players
Coaches

Pos.	No.	Name	Age – Date of birth	Height	Club	Ctr.
G	4	Rosa Kairi	21 – 28 September 1997	1.58 m (5 ft 2 in)	Chariots	(Papua New Guinea)
F	5	Denienne Bray	20 – 29 May 1999	1.65 m (5 ft 5 in)	Exodus	(Papua New Guinea)
F	6	Nester Sape	30 – 3 October 1988	1.65 m (5 ft 5 in)	Exodus	(Papua New Guinea)
G	7	Magdalene Javapro	16 – 21 April 2003		Goldfield Giants	(Australia)
F	8	Sherah Yawasing	23 – 2 April 1996
	9	Jonitha Warabe	24 – 14 December 1994		Mt Hagen	(Papua New Guinea)
F	10	Marca Muri	34 – 14 April 1985	1.68 m (5 ft 6 in)
G	11	Ericka Amos	21 – 20 May 1998		NS Busu	(Papua New Guinea)
C	12	Lewa Hani	40 – 15 July 1978	1.75 m (5 ft 9 in)	Chariots	(Papua New Guinea)
F	13	Normalisa Dobunaba	20 – 24 November 1998	1.66 m (5 ft 5 in)	Exodus	(Papua New Guinea)
F	14	Betty Angula	30 – 2 December 1988	1.69 m (5 ft 7 in)	Exodus	(Papua New Guinea)

Head coach

- (Papua New Guinea) Moi Muri

Legend

- (C) Team captain
- Club – describes last
  club before the tournament
- Age – describes age
  on 7 July 2019

Tournament summary

Event	Team	Preliminary round				Quarterfinals	Semifinals	Final / GM	
Event	Team	Opposition Score	Opposition Score	Opposition Score	Rank	Opposition Score	Opposition Score	Opposition Score	Rank
Women's	Papua New Guinea	Guam; L 48–84	Tahiti; L 66–70	American Samoa; L 45–100	4	Did not advance			

=== Basketball (3x3) ===
Men

- Dia Muri
- Augustine Kaupa
- Obert Muri
- Jordan Sere

Women

- Louisa Wallace
- Elina Yala
- Serah Amos
- Christine Oscar

== Boxing ==
The Papua New Guinea Amateur Boxing Association (PNGABA) announced a team of 12 boxers (10 men, 2 women). The list was confirmed on 17 June 2019.

Men

Athlete	Event	Round of 32	Round of 16	Quarterfinals	Semifinals	Final	
Athlete	Event	Opposition Result	Opposition Result	Opposition Result	Opposition Result	Opposition Result	Rank
Maxie Mangea	Light flyweight (49kg)	–	–	–	–	–	
Charles Keama	Flyweight (52kg)	–	–	–	–	–	
Jamie Chang	Flyweight (52kg)	–	–	–	–	–	
Thadius Katua	Lightweight (60kg)	–	–	–	–	–	
John Ume	Light welterweight (64kg)	–	–	–	–	–	
Neville Warupi	Welterweight (69kg)	–	–	–	–	–	
Warren Warupi	Welterweight (69kg)	–	–	–	–	–	
Lukas Wakore	Light heavyweight (81kg)	–	–	–	–	–	
Arthur Ray Lavalou	Heavyweight (91kg)	–	–	–	–	–	
Tomasi Kami	Super Heavyweight (+91kg)	–	–	–	–	–	

Women

Athlete	Event	Round of 32	Round of 16	Quarterfinals	Semifinals	Final	
Athlete	Event	Opposition Result	Opposition Result	Opposition Result	Opposition Result	Opposition Result	Rank
Flora Loga	Flyweight (51kg)	–	–	–	–	–	
Laizani Soma	Lightweight (60kg)	–	–	–	–	–	

== Football ==
=== Tournament summary ===
Team	Event	Preliminary round					Final	
Team	Event	Opposition Score	Opposition Score	Opposition Score	Opposition Score	Rank	Opposition Score	Rank
Papua New Guinea men's	Men's	Samoa; W 6–0	Vanuatu; W 2–0	New Zealand; L 0–2	Tonga; W 8–0	2	Fiji; L 2–4^{P} 1–1 (a.e.t.)	4
Papua New Guinea women's	Women's	Solomon Islands; W 5–2	Tahiti; W 4–0	Vanuatu; W 6–1	Cook Islands; W 5–1	1	Samoa; W 3–1	1st place, gold medalist(s)

=== Men ===
The final squad was announced on 12 June 2019.

Head coach: Bob Morris

No.	Pos.	Player	Date of birth (age)	Caps	Goals	Club
	GK	Ronald Warisan	20 September 1989 (aged 29)	13	0	(Papua New Guinea Football Association) Toti City Dwellers
	GK	Ishmael Pole	25 January 1993 (aged 26)	0	0	(Papua New Guinea Football Association) Hekari United
	DF	Koriak Upaiga	13 June 1987 (aged 32)	14	1	(Papua New Guinea Football Association) Hekari United
	DF	Felix Komolong	6 March 1997 (aged 22)	12	0	(United States Soccer Federation) Northern Kentucky Norse
	DF	Daniel Joe	29 May 1990 (aged 29)	12	0	(Papua New Guinea Football Association) Hekari United
	DF	Alwin Komolong	2 November 1994 (aged 24)	12	0	(German Football Association) Fortuna Köln
	DF	Joshua Talau	19 April 1996 (aged 23)	1	0	(Papua New Guinea Football Association) Toti City Dwellers
	DF	Dinniget Luaine	16 May 2000 (aged 19)	0	0	(Papua New Guinea Football Association) Besta PNG United
	DF	Langarap Samol	21 July 1989 (aged 29)	0	0	(Papua New Guinea Football Association) Kagua-Erave
	MF	Michael Foster	5 September 1985 (aged 33)	23	7	(Papua New Guinea Football Association) Toti City Dwellers
	MF	David Muta	24 October 1987 (aged 31)	17	1	(Papua New Guinea Football Association) Hekari United
	MF	Emmanuel Simon	25 December 1992 (aged 26)	13	0	(Papua New Guinea Football Association) Toti City Dwellers
	MF	Jacob Sabua	25 August 1994 (aged 24)	11	0	(Papua New Guinea Football Association) Toti City Dwellers
	MF	Patrick Aisa	6 July 1994 (aged 25)	8	2	(Papua New Guinea Football Association) Hekari United
	MF	Kolu Kepo		1	0	(Papua New Guinea Football Association) Hekari United
	MF	Gregory Togubai	22 March 1998 (aged 21)	0	0	(Papua New Guinea Football Association) Eastern Stars
	FW	Raymond Gunemba	4 June 1986 (aged 33)	17	9	(Papua New Guinea Football Association) Toti City Dwellers
	FW	Nigel Dabinyaba	26 October 1992 (aged 26)	13	6	(Papua New Guinea Football Association) Toti City Dwellers
	FW	Tommy Semmy	30 September 1994 (aged 24)	10	3	(New Zealand Football) Hamilton Wanderers
	FW	David Browne	27 December 1995 (aged 23)	3	0	(New Zealand Football) Auckland City
	FW	Alex Kamen	26 August 1993 (aged 25)	0	0	(Papua New Guinea Football Association) Morobe United
	FW	Jonathan Allen	3 January 2000 (aged 19)	0	0	(Papua New Guinea Football Association) Besta PNG United
	FW	Ati Kepo		0	0	(Papua New Guinea Football Association) Hekari United

=== Women ===
Roster

Caps and goals updated as of 8 July 2019, after the game against the Solomon Islands.

No.	Pos.	Player	Date of birth (age)	Caps	Goals	Club
1	GK	Fidelma Watpore	9 February 1988 (age 38)	13	0	(Papua New Guinea Football Association) POM
20	GK	Betty Sam	12 October 1992 (age 33)	4	0	(Papua New Guinea Football Association) Kimbe
23	GK	Faith Kasiray	20 December 1999 (age 26)	2	0	(Papua New Guinea Football Association) Ramu
2	DF	Dorcas Sesevo		14	0	(Papua New Guinea Football Association) POM
4	DF	Lucy Maino	2 August 1995 (age 30)	5	2	(United States Soccer Federation) Hawaii–Hilo Vulcans
14	DF	Joelyne Aimi	16 November 1994 (age 31)	3	0	(Papua New Guinea Football Association) Lae
16	DF	Michaella Kurabi	13 April 1996 (age 30)	1	0	(Papua New Guinea Football Association) Madang
19	DF	Georgina Bakani	6 December 1996 (age 29)	6	0	(Papua New Guinea Football Association) Kimbe
22	DF	Asaiso Gossie	1 January 2003 (age 23)	0	0	(Papua New Guinea Football Association) Ramu
3	MF	Margret Joseph	4 January 1999 (age 27)	6	0	(Papua New Guinea Football Association) POM
5	MF	Sandra Birum	6 June 1992 (age 34)	23	7	(Papua New Guinea Football Association) Lae
6	MF	Rayleen Bauelua	11 January 1995 (age 31)	6	1	(Papua New Guinea Football Association) POM
7	MF	Yvonne Gabong	29 August 1996 (age 29)	13	2	(Papua New Guinea Football Association) POM
8	MF	Serah Tamgol	14 September 1999 (age 26)	0	0	(Papua New Guinea Football Association) Lae
9	MF	Deslyn Siniu	2 January 1981 (age 45)	43	19	(Papua New Guinea Football Association) POM
11	MF	Marie Kaipu	16 August 1997 (age 28)	11	8	(Papua New Guinea Football Association) POM
12	MF	Ramona Padio	13 March 1998 (age 28)	10	7	(Papua New Guinea Football Association) Kimbe
15	MF	Lydia Kose		0	0	(Papua New Guinea Football Association) POM
17	MF	Shalom Waida	1 January 2001 (age 25)	1	0	(Papua New Guinea Football Association) POM
10	FW	Meagen Gunemba	4 June 1995 (age 31)	14	19	(Papua New Guinea Football Association) Lae
13	FW	Selina Unamba	24 November 1999 (age 26)	6	2	(Papua New Guinea Football Association) Lae
18	FW	Gloria Laeli	25 March 1997 (age 29)	1	0	(Papua New Guinea Football Association) POM
21	FW	Gloria Balamus		0	0	(Papua New Guinea Football Association) Wewak

== Golf ==
Papua New Guinea qualified eight players for the 2019 tournament:

Men

- Morgan Annato
- Soti Dinki
- Cassie Koma
- Gideon Tikili

Women

- Kristine Seko
- Shavina Maras
- Natalie Mok
- Raetania Weiki

== Judo ==
A team of 6 judoka's (3 men, 3 women) was confirmed and named on the 17 June 2019.

Men

Athlete	Event	Round of 32	Round of 16	Quarterfinals	Semifinals	Repechage	Final/BM	
Athlete	Event	Opposition Result	Opposition Result	Opposition Result	Opposition Result	Opposition Result	Opposition Result	Rank
Raymond Ovinou	-66 kg	-	–	–	–	-	–	
Ashaan Nelson	-73 kg	-	–	–	–	-	–	
Kinsley Vui	-73 kg	-	–	–	–	-	–	

Women

Athlete	Event	Round of 32	Round of 16	Quarterfinals	Semifinals	Repechage	Final/BM	
Athlete	Event	Opposition Result	Opposition Result	Opposition Result	Opposition Result	Opposition Result	Opposition Result	Rank
Marie Keneke		-	–	–	–	-	–	
Kay-Cee Keneke		-	–	–	–	-	–	
Serah Paraka		-	–	–	–	-	–	

== Rugby league nines ==
Papua New Guinea selected fifteen men and fifteen women for the rugby league nines at the 2019 games.

Men's tournament

- Maya Clarke
- Sailas Gahuna
- Jah Hogen
- Rex Kaupa
- Joel Kee
- Eliakim Lukara
- Moses Okapila
- Mega Pali
- Bill Paul
- Solomon Pokare
- John Ragi Jnr
- Abel Rami
- John Stanley
- Sani Wabo
- Messach Wallen
- Coach: Leonard Tarum
- Manager: Ronnie Titie Jnr
- Trainer: Joe Bruno

Women's tournament

- Elsie Albert
- Catherine Anjo
- Heather Ario
- Lynel Aua
- Carol Francis
- Shirley Joe
- Janet Johns
- Roswita Kapo
- Joan Kuman
- Lancy Laki
- Lydia Luke
- Ray Rambi
- Winnie Steven
- Joyce Waula
- Vero Waula
- Coach: Bagelo Solien
- Manager: Ruth Turia
- Trainer: Dela Audama

== Rugby sevens ==
Women's tournament

The Papua New Guinea Rugby Union announced its women's rugby sevens team on 28 June 2019.

Roster

No.	Pos.	Player	Date of birth (age)	Union / Club
1	FW	Kymlie Rapilla(c)		National Capital District
2	FW	Lynette Kwarula	July 4, 1990 (aged 29)	National Capital District
3	FW	Marie Biyama	March 1, 1998 (aged 21)	Central
4	BK	Fatima Rama	January 28, 1981 (aged 38)	Central
5	BK	Taiva Lavai	September 16, 1983 (aged 35)	New Capital District
6	BK	Gemma Schnaubelt	August 20, 1997 (aged 21)	Queensland
7	BK	Alice Alois		National Capital District
8		Yolanda Gittins	October 20, 1992 (aged 26)	Queensland
9		Helen Abau	May 16, 1991 (aged 28)	Central
10		Marlugu Dixon	August 17, 1986 (aged 32)	Queensland
11	FW	Melanie Kawa	January 11, 1986 (aged 32)	Queensland
12		Gwen Pokana		New Capital District

Tournament summary

Event	Team	Preliminary round				Quarterfinals	Semifinals	Final / BM	
Event	Team	Opposition Score	Opposition Score	Opposition Score	Rank	Opposition Score	Opposition Score	Opposition Score	Rank
Women's	Papua New Guinea	Nauru; W 41–0	Solomon Islands; W 53–0	Fiji; L 5–38	2	New Caledonia; W 40–O	Australia; L 7–31	Samoa; W 28–12	3rd place, bronze medalist(s)

== Sailing ==
The Papua New Guinea Yachting Association announced two sailors, siblings Teariki and Rose-Lee Numa, on 17 June 2019.

Men

Athlete	Event	Race													Net points	Final rank
Athlete	Event	1	2	3	4	5	6	7	8	9	10	11	12	M*	Net points	Final rank
Teariki Numa																

Women

Athlete	Event	Race													Net points	Final rank
Athlete	Event	1	2	3	4	5	6	7	8	9	10	11	12	M*	Net points	Final rank
Rose-Lee Numa																

== Shooting ==
Men

Athlete	Event	Qualification		Final	
Athlete	Event	Points	Rank	Points	Rank

== Swimming ==
The Papua New Guinea Swimming Incorporated (PNGSI) announced a ten-member squad for the games.

=== Men ===
- Josh Tarere
- Holly John
- Benedict Aika
- Samuel Seghers
- Ryan Maskelyne
- Leonard Kalate

=== Women ===
- Judith Meauri
- Georgia-Leigh Vele
- Britney Murray
- Anthea Murray

== Taekwondo ==
PNG qualified four (4) athletes in Taekwondo in the 2019 Games and they won three silver medals:

Women

- Rose Mary Tona (46 kg) −46 kg

Men

- Bobby Willie (54 kg) −54 kg
- Steven Tommy (63 kg) −63 kg
- Henry Ori (74 kg)

== Tennis ==
The Papua New Guinea Tennis Association announced a team of 7 athletes (3 men and 4 women).

=== Singles ===
Event	Competitor	Round of 32	Round of 16	Quarter Final	Semi Final	Final	Rank
Event	Competitor	Opposition Results	Opposition Result	Opposition Result	Opposition Result	Opposition Result	Rank
Men	Mark Gibbons	– –	– –	– –	– –	– –	
Men	Eddie Mera	– –	– –	– –	– –	– –	
Men	Matthew Stubbings	– –	– –	– –	– –	– –	
Women	Patricia Apisah	– –	– –	– –	– –	– –	
Women	Violet Apisah	– –	– –	– –	– –	– –	
Women	Abigail Tere-Apisah	– –	– –	– –	– –	– –	
Women	Marcia Tere-Apisah	– –	– –	– –	– –	– –	

=== Doubles ===
Event	Competitor	Round of 16	Quarter Final	Semi Final	Final	Rank
Event	Competitor	Opposition Results	Opposition Result	Opposition Result	Opposition Result	Rank
Men		– –	– –	– –	– –	– –
Women		– –	– –	– –	– –	– –
Women		– –	– –	– –	– –	– –
Mixed		– –	– –	– –	– –	– –
Mixed		– –	– –	– –	– –	– –
Mixed		– –	– –	– –	– –	– –

=== Team event ===
Event	Team	Preliminary round				Semifinals	Final / GM	
Event	Team	Opposition Score	Opposition Score	Opposition Score	Rank	Opposition Score	Opposition Score	Rank
Men's team	Papua New Guinea	Guam; W 3–0	American Samoa; W 3–0	Tonga; W 2–1	1	Samoa; W 2–1	Northern Mariana Islands; L 0–2	2nd place, silver medalist(s)
Women's team	Papua New Guinea	Cook Islands; W 3–0	Northern Mariana Islands; W 3–0	Samoa; W 2–1	1	American Samoa; W 2–0	Samoa; W 2–1	1st place, gold medalist(s)

== Touch rugby ==
Men's team roster

- Francis Alu
- Eugene Eka
- Freddy Gelam
- Junior Hoki
- Kele Lessy
- Farapo Makura
- Paul Matuta
- Kere Mavia
- Benny Nelson
- Ravu Ravu
- Marlon Steven
- Andrew Turlom
- Bobby Vavona
- Ellson Waluka

Women's team roster

- Maria Alu
- Pauline Arazi
- Mangai Elomi
- Georgina Genaka
- Angela Geno
- Emmalyn John
- Grace Kouba
- Natalia Kuper
- Bessie Peter
- Kelly Peter
- Nadya Taubuso
- Joylyn Tikot
- Angelena Watego

=== Summary ===
Event	Team	Preliminary round							Semifinals	Final / GM	
Event	Team	Opposition Score	Opposition Score	Opposition Score	Opposition Score	Opposition Score	Opposition Score	Rank	Opposition Score	Opposition Score	Rank
Men's	Papua New Guinea	Tonga; W 21–4	Solomon Islands; W 15–2	Cook Islands; W 7–3	Tokelau; W 18–3	Fiji; W 12–6	Samoa; W 9–8	1	Fiji; W 10–7	Samoa; W 12–11	1st place, gold medalist(s)
Women's	Papua New Guinea	Solomon Islands; W 30–1	Tonga; W 20–0	Samoa; W 8–0	Cook Islands; W 6–2	Fiji; W 7–6	—N/a	1	Fiji; W 10–6	Samoa; W 9–4	1st place, gold medalist(s)
Mixed	Papua New Guinea	Solomon Islands; W 18–2	Tonga; W 14–6	Cook Islands; W 13–5	Fiji; W 11–3	Samoa; W 14–12	—N/a	1	Fiji; W 9–5	Samoa; W 10–9	1st place, gold medalist(s)

== Volleyball ==
The Papua New Guinea Volleyball Federation (PNGVF) will only enter three teams. The men's national indoor team (14 athletes) and both men's and women's national beach volleyball team's (2 athletes per team). The final total squad of 18 athletes was announced on 17 June 2019.

=== Beach volleyball ===
Men's tournament

Event	Athlete	Preliminary round				Quarterfinals	Semifinals	Final / GM	
Event	Athlete	Opposition Score	Opposition Score	Opposition Score	Rank	Opposition Score	Opposition Score	Opposition Score	Rank
Men's	Richard Batari; Loi Walo	–	–	–		–	–	–	

Women's tournament

Event	Athlete	Preliminary round				Quarterfinals	Semifinals	Final / GM	
Event	Athlete	Opposition Score	Opposition Score	Opposition Score	Rank	Opposition Score	Opposition Score	Opposition Score	Rank
Women's	Zoe Awadu; Emily Bae	–	–	–		–	–	–	

=== Volleyball (Indoor) ===
Men's tournament

== Weightlifting ==
The Papua New Guinea Weightlifting Federation selected 10 weightlifters (5 men, 5 women) for the 2019 games.

Men

Athlete	Event	Snatch	Rank	Clean & jerk	Rank	Total	Rank
Gahuna Nauari	55 kg	80	3rd place, bronze medalist(s)	108	2nd place, silver medalist(s)	188	2nd place, silver medalist(s)
Scofield Sinaka	55 kg	75	4	108	3rd place, bronze medalist(s)	183	4
Morea Baru	61 kg	124	1st place, gold medalist(s)	160	1st place, gold medalist(s)	284	1st place, gold medalist(s)
Toua Udia	81 kg	116	7	NL	—	NL	DNF
Steven Kari	96 kg	156	2nd place, silver medalist(s)	198	1st place, gold medalist(s)	354	1st place, gold medalist(s)

Women

Athlete	Event	Snatch	Rank	Clean & jerk	Rank	Total	Rank
Konio Toua	45 kg	50	2nd place, silver medalist(s)	65	2nd place, silver medalist(s)	115	2nd place, silver medalist(s)
Dika Toua	49 kg	75	1st place, gold medalist(s)	100	1st place, gold medalist(s)	175	1st place, gold medalist(s)
Sandra Ako	71 kg	80	3rd place, bronze medalist(s)	98	3rd place, bronze medalist(s)	178	3rd place, bronze medalist(s)
Noi Bernadette Igo	81 kg	70	3rd place, bronze medalist(s)	94	2nd place, silver medalist(s)	164	2nd place, silver medalist(s)
Lorraine Harry	87 kg	85	3rd place, bronze medalist(s)	107	2nd place, silver medalist(s)	192	2nd place, silver medalist(s)
