= New Caledonia at the 2019 Pacific Games =

- IOC code: NCL

8 July 2019 – 20 July 2019
- Competitors: in 22 sports
- Medals Ranked 1st: Gold 76 Silver 55 Bronze 51 Total 182

Pacific Games appearances
- 1963; 1966; 1969; 1971; 1975; 1979; 1983; 1987; 1991; 1995; 1999; 2003; 2007; 2011; 2015; 2019; 2023

New Caledonia competed at the 2019 Pacific Games in Apia, Samoa from 7 to 20 July 2019. The country selected 327 athletes to participate in 22 sports at the 2019 games.

== Badminton ==
New Caledonia qualified eight players in badminton for the 2019 games.

Men

- Ronan Ho-Yagues
- Bryan Nicole
- Morgan Paitio

Women

- Soizick Ho-Yagues
- Johanna Kou
- Dgenyva Matauli
- Cecilia Moussy
- Melissa Sanmoestanom

== Basketball ==
=== 5x5 ===
==== Men's basketball ====
- TBC

==== Women's basketball ====
- TBC

=== 3x3 ===
==== Men ====
- TBC

==== Women ====
- TBC

== Football ==
=== Men's football ===
Squad

TBC

=== Women's football ===
Squad

TBC

== Golf ==
New Caledonia qualified eight players for the 2019 tournament:

Men

- Morgan Dufour
- Adrien Peres
- Guillaume Castagne
- Dylan Benoit

Women

- Ariane Klotz
- Emilie Ricaud
- Mathilde Guepy
- Ines Lavelua-Tufele

== Volleyball ==
=== Beach volleyball ===
New Caledonia selected 4 athletes to compete in beach volleyball, a men's pair and a women's pair.

Men

- Euphraim Iwane
- Rudy Issamatro

Women

- Julia Qazing
- Evelyne Lawi

=== Volleyball (Indoor) ===
Teams of 14 players each were selected for men's and women's indoor volleyball.

Men

- Jordan Boula
- Jonathan Goulou
- Ludovik Iloai
- Vitolio Iloai
- Morten Kahlemue
- Rodrigue Manuahalalo
- Quincy Manuopuava
- Petelo Motuku
- Jimmy Ngaiohny Jr
- Maoni Talia
- Romain Totele
- Freddy Wea
- Jacques Wainebengo
- Christopher Suve

Women

- Ramana Ariioehau
- Sabine Haewegene
- Moone Konhu
- Aurélie Konhu
- Coralie Maccam
- Liwenda Manuohalalo
- Sarah Nehoune
- Andréa Puakavase
- Déborah Rokuad
- Luawé Tangopi
- Beverley Vaoheilala
- Alexia Wanabo
- Evangélia Wanabo
- Hmadren Wenehoua
