= Samoa at the 2019 Pacific Games =

- IOC code: SAM
- National federation: Samoa Association of Sports and National Olympic Committee

8 July 2019 – 20 July 2019
- Competitors: 506 in 26 sports
- Medals Ranked 3rd: Gold 38 Silver 42 Bronze 45 Total 125

Pacific Games appearances
- 1963; 1966; 1969; 1971; 1975; 1979; 1983; 1987; 1991; 1995; 1999; 2003; 2007; 2011; 2015; 2019; 2023

Samoa competed at the 2019 Pacific Games in Apia, Samoa from 7 to 20 July 2019. As the host nation, Samoa participated in all 26 sports present at the 2019 games.

== Badminton ==
Samoa qualified ten players in Badminton for the 2019 games.

Men

- Tupu Fua
- Charles Iamanu Faalogoifo
- Joetel Ng Lam
- Aukuso Samuelu Sue
- Kennedy Simanu
- Hilton Soo

Women

- Folole Ioane
- Angel Reti
- Cherish Reti
- Peta Teo

== Basketball ==
=== 5x5 ===
==== Men's basketball ====
* TBC

==== Women's basketball ====
- TBC

=== 3x3 basketball ===
Samoa selected eight players (four male and four female) to compete in 3x3 at the 2019 games:

Men

- Ezra Tufuga
- Dru-Leo Ape
- Ryan Paia
- Theodore McFarland

Women

- Cherish Manumaleuga
- Aufui Sa'u
- Sommer Motufoua
- Zhanay Hettig

== Football ==
=== Men's football ===
Squad

TBC

=== Women's football ===
Squad

TBC

== Golf ==
Samoa named teams of four men and four women to compete in the 2019 golf tournament:

Men

- Robert Fa'aaliga
- Samu Ropati
- Van Wright
- Niko Vui

Manager: Mike Kapisi

Women

- Faith Vui
- Olive Auva'a
- Aileen Meredith
- Leleaga Meredith

Manager: Bronwyn Sesega

== Netball ==
Samoa named eleven women in their netball team for the 2019 games.

Samoa roster
Players
Coaches

Name	Pos	DOB	Height	Club	Nat	Caps
Sopolemalama Tuitama-Alsop			–		(Samoa)
Courteney Brown			–		(Australia)
Silalomalava Palamo			–		(Australia)
Romania Pose			–		(Samoa)
Georgia Ropati			–		(New Zealand)
Alyssa-Jean Savelio			–		(New Zealand)
Anna Senio			–		(New Zealand)
Shenade Southon			–		(Australia)
Larafina Tanielu-Stowers	GS, GK		–	Collegiate Samoa	(Samoa)
Tafaoga Tavae			–		(Samoa)
Brooklyn Tharp			–		(New Zealand)
Alyssa Niko-Tuifao			–	College Rifles	(New Zealand)

Head coach

- Seraphine Mataia

Assistant coach

- Ruta Schwalger

Manager: Punaoleola Muaitau

Notes

- (c) – Captain
- (cc) – Co-captain
- (vc) – Vice-captain
- – Injury / maternity leave
- (TRP) – Temporary Replacement Player
Player profiles: [ Team website]
Last updated: 23 July 2022

== Rugby league nines ==
=== Men's rugby league ===
- TBC

=== Women's rugby league ===
- TBC

== Rugby sevens ==
=== Men's sevens ===
Samoa registered a squad of fourteen players for the men's sevens tournament, with two to be omitted from the final team at the 2019 games.

Manu Samoa sevens squad

- David Afamasaga
- Elisapeta Alofipo
- Tomasi Alosio Logotuli
- Siaosi Asofolau
- Laaloi Leilua
- Tila Mealoi
- Alamanda Motuga
- Joe Perez
- Paul Lusi Perez
- Johnny Samuelu
- Tofatuimoana Solia
- Paulo Toilolo Fanuasa
- John Vaili
- Sione Young Yen

Coach: Gordon Tietjens

=== Women's sevens ===
Samoa registered a squad of fifteen players for the women's sevens tournament, with three to be omitted for the final team at the 2019 games.

Manusina sevens squad

- Caitlin Pritchard
- Epi Tafili
- Soteria Pulumu
- Elisapeta Leti
- Mauisuimatamaalii Tauasa Pauaraisa
- Lomi Peniamina
- Fa'alua Lefulefu
- Ta'imua Ta'iao
- Victoria Lauina
- Perise Tumutumu
- Seifono Misili
- Easter Savelio
- Alafou Fatu
- Apaau Ma'ilau
- Maria Jacinta Ausai

Coach: La’auli Rudy Leavasa

== Swimming ==
Samoan national swim coach Suzie Schuster named fifteen swimmers, ten men and five women, for the 2019 games.

Men

- Pitapola Ioane
- Gideon Mulitalo
- Durant Webster
- Seth Bates
- Ronny Iosefatu
- Brandon Schuster
- Vernon Wetzell
- Thomas Kokoro Frost
- Thomas Auega Morriss
- Sitivi Sooaemalelagi

Women

- Lushavel Stickland
- Jelani Wetzell
- Lauren Sale
- Kaiya Brown
- Andrea Schuster

== Weightlifting ==
Samoa named twelve men and nine women to compete in weightlifting at the 2019 games.

- Coach: Tuaopepe Wallwork
- Team Managers: Salimu Lui, Tauvale Faamausili
- Assistant Coaches: Mary Opeloge, Ele Opeloge

Men

- Malachi Faamausilifala
- Jack Opeloge
- Vaipava Ioane
- Siaosi Leuo
- Lauititi Lui
- Sanele Mao
- Maeu Nanai Livi
- Don Opeloge
- Petunu Opeloge Tovia
- John Tafi
- Tavita Toe Leilua
- Petelo Tuiloma Lautusi

Women

- Tauvale Elia Ulaula
- Lesila Fiapule
- Sekolasitika Isaia
- Loto Pereira
- Tuualii Ropati
- Saofaialo Jim
- Iuniarra Sipaia
- Leotina Sive Petelo
- Feagaiga Stowers
