= List of Norwegian records in Olympic weightlifting =

The following are the national records in Olympic weightlifting in Norway. Records are maintained in each weight class for the snatch lift, clean and jerk lift, and the total for both lifts by the Norwegian Weightlifting Federation (Norges Vektløfterforbund/ NVF).

== Current records ==
=== Men ===
Event	Record	Athlete	Date	Meet	Place	Ref
60 kg
Snatch	86 kg	Standard				
Clean & Jerk	106 kg	Standard				
Total	192 kg	Standard				
65 kg
Snatch	99 kg	Kim Alexander Kvernø	29 August 2026			
Clean & Jerk	121 kg	Kim Alexander Kvernø	29 August 2026			
Total	220 kg	Kim Alexander Kvernø	29 August 2026			
70 kg
Snatch	110 kg	Standard				
Clean & Jerk	134 kg	Standard				
Total	244 kg	Standard				
75 kg
Snatch	125 kg	Stefan Rønnevik	16 October 2026	European U23 Championships	Durrës, Albania	
Clean & Jerk	155 kg	Stefan Rønnevik	29 August 2026			
Total	278 kg	Stefan Rønnevik	29 August 2026			
85 kg
Snatch	132 kg	Standard				
Clean & Jerk	160 kg	Standard				
Total	292 kg	Standard				
95 kg
Snatch	138 kg	Standard				
Clean & Jerk	168 kg	Standard				
Total	306 kg	Standard				
110 kg
Snatch	144 kg	Standard				
Clean & Jerk	176 kg	Standard				
Total	320 kg	Standard				
+110 kg
Snatch	177 kg	Ragnar Holme	8 November 2026	World Championships	Ningbo, China	
Clean & Jerk	218 kg	Ragnar Holme	10 October 2026		Fornebu, Norway	
Total	394 kg	Ragnar Holme	8 November 2026	World Championships	Ningbo, China	

=== Women ===
Event	Record	Athlete	Date	Meet	Place	Ref
49 kg
Snatch	53 kg	Standard				
Clean & Jerk	67 kg	Standard				
Total	120 kg	Standard				
53 kg
Snatch	79 kg	Rebekka Tao Jacobsen	29 October 2026	World Championships	Ningbo, China	
Clean & Jerk	104 kg	Rebekka Tao Jacobsen	29 October 2026	World Championships	Ningbo, China	
Total	183 kg	Rebekka Tao Jacobsen	29 October 2026	World Championships	Ningbo, China	
57 kg
Snatch	81 kg	Standard				
Clean & Jerk	105 kg	Rebekka Tao Jacobsen	29 August 2026			
Total	186 kg	Rebekka Tao Jacobsen	29 August 2026			
61 kg
Snatch	84 kg	Standard				
Clean & Jerk	106 kg	Standard				
Total	190 kg	Standard				
69 kg
Snatch	90 kg	Standard				
Clean & Jerk	112 kg	Standard				
Total	202 kg	Standard				
77 kg
Snatch	96 kg	Standard				
Clean & Jerk	118 kg	Standard				
Total	214 kg	Standard				
86 kg
Snatch	102 kg	Standard				
Clean & Jerk	124 kg	Standard				
Total	226 kg	Standard				
+86 kg
Snatch	108 kg	Standard				
Clean & Jerk	130 kg	Standard				
Total	238 kg	Standard				

== Historical records ==
=== Men (2025–2026) ===
Event	Record	Athlete	Date	Meet	Place	Ref
60 kg
Snatch	93 kg	Standard				
Clean & Jerk	118 kg	Standard				
Total	211 kg	Standard				
65 kg
Snatch	106 kg	Standard				
Clean & Jerk	135 kg	Standard				
Total	241 kg	Standard				
71 kg
Snatch	120 kg	Stefan Rønnevik	28 February 2026	Norwegian Championships	Fillan, Norway	
Clean & Jerk	152 kg	Stefan Rønnevik	16 December 2025		Tysvær, Norway	
Total	270 kg	Stefan Rønnevik	16 December 2025		Tysvær, Norway	
79 kg
Snatch	122 kg	Remy Heggvik Aune	5 July 2026		Potsdam, Germany	
Clean & Jerk	165 kg	Remy Heggvik Aune	15 November 2025	Nordic Championships	Garðabær, Iceland	
Total	284 kg	Remy Heggvik Aune	6 December 2025		Spydeberg, Norway	
88 kg
Snatch	132 kg	Sigurd Haug Korsvoll	28 February 2026	Norwegian Championships	Fillan, Norway	
Clean & Jerk	168 kg	Sigurd Haug Korsvoll	28 February 2026	Norwegian Championships	Fillan, Norway	
Total	300 kg	Sigurd Haug Korsvoll	28 February 2026	Norwegian Championships	Fillan, Norway	
94 kg
Snatch	133 kg	Standard				
Clean & Jerk	170 kg	Standard				
Total	303 kg	Standard				
110 kg
Snatch	140 kg	Jørgen Kjellevand	10 October 2025	World Championships	Førde, Norway	
Clean & Jerk	178 kg	Standard				
Total	317 kg	Standard				
+110 kg
Snatch	178 kg	Ragnar Holme	10 October 2025	World Championships	Førde, Norway	
Clean & Jerk	218 kg	Ragnar Holme	26 April 2026	European Championships	Batumi, Georgia	
Total	394 kg	Ragnar Holme	26 April 2026	European Championships	Batumi, Georgia	

=== Men (2018–2025) ===
Event	Record	Athlete	Date	Meet)	Place	Ref
55 kg
Snatch	75 kg	Thomas Eide	28 November 2020		Kristiansand, Norway	
Clean & Jerk	93 kg	Emil Sveum	12 November 2022		Iceland	
Total	168 kg	Emil Sveum	12 November 2022		Iceland	
61 kg
Snatch	98 kg	Kim Alexander Kværnø	1 March 2025	Norwegian Championships	Bergen, Norway	
Clean & Jerk	121 kg	Kim Alexander Kværnø	1 March 2025	Norwegian Championships	Bergen, Norway	
Total	219 kg	Kim Alexander Kværnø	1 March 2025	Norwegian Championships	Bergen, Norway	
67 kg
Snatch	119 kg	Daniel Roness	2 March 2019	Norwegian Championships	Stavern, Norway	
Clean & Jerk	148 kg	Daniel Roness	2 March 2019	Norwegian Championships	Stavern, Norway	
Total	267 kg	Daniel Roness	2 March 2019	Norwegian Championships	Stavern, Norway	
73 kg
Snatch	122 kg	Daniel Roness	11 May 2019		Bergen, Norway	
Clean & Jerk	160 kg	Daniel Roness	6 April 2021	European Championships	Moscow, Russia	
Total	281 kg	Daniel Roness	6 April 2021	European Championships	Moscow, Russia	
81 kg
Snatch	128 kg	Ronny Matnisdal	22 January 2022		Vigrestad, Norway	
Clean & Jerk	164 kg	Håkon Bekkevold	14 October 2023		Sarpsborg, Norway	
Total	286 kg	Håkon Bekkevold	2 March 2024		Vigrestad, Norway	
89 kg
Snatch	134 kg	Håvard Grostad	2 March 2019		Larvik, Norway	
Clean & Jerk	169 kg	Mats Olsen	1 March 2020	Norwegian Championships	Vigrestad, Norway	
Total	295 kg	Mats Olsen	31 August 2019	Aalborg Cup	Aalborg, Denmark	
96 kg
Snatch	132 kg	Reza Benorouz	2 March 2025	Norwegian Championships	Bergen, Norway	
Clean & Jerk	162 kg	Reza Benorouz	1 February 2025		Spydeberg, Norway	
Total	294 kg	Reza Benorouz	1 February 2025		Spydeberg, Norway	
102 kg
Snatch	138 kg	Vetle Andersen	9 December 2023		Spydeberg, Norway	
Clean & Jerk	167 kg	Erlend Raastad	13 April 2023		Bergen, Norway	
Total	295 kg	Hohint Yousif Wat	19 January 2025		Trondheim, Norway	
109 kg
Snatch	141 kg	Kim Eirik Tollefsen	2 March 2025	Norwegian Championships	Bergen, Norway	
Clean & Jerk	175 kg	Kim Eirik Tollefsen	2 March 2025	Norwegian Championships	Bergen, Norway	
Total	316 kg	Kim Eirik Tollefsen	2 March 2025	Norwegian Championships	Bergen, Norway	
+109 kg
Snatch	182 kg	Ragnar Holme	21 April 2025	European Championships	Chișinău, Moldova	
Clean & Jerk	215 kg	Ragnar Holme	2 March 2025	Norwegian Championships	Bergen, Norway	
Total	385 kg	Ragnar Holme	2 March 2025	Norwegian Championships	Bergen, Norway	

=== Men (1998–2018) ===
Event	Record	Athlete	Date	Meet	Place	Ref
–56 kg
Snatch	87 kg	Thomas Eide	21 January 2012		Bergen, Norway	
Clean & Jerk	110 kg	Thomas Eide	2 December 2012	European Junior Championships	Eilat, Israel	
Total	192 kg	Thomas Eide	21 January 2012		Bergen, Norway	
–62 kg
Snatch	105 kg	Thomas Eide	20 February 2016	Norwegian Championships	Trondheim, Norway	
Clean & Jerk	130 kg	Thomas Eide	20 February 2016	Norwegian Championships	Trondheim, Norway	
Total	235 kg	Thomas Eide	20 February 2016	Norwegian Championships	Trondheim, Norway	
–69 kg
Snatch	118 kg	Daniel Roness	2 September 2017	Nordic Championships	Upplands Väsby, Sweden	
Clean & Jerk	150 kg	Daniel Roness	12 August 2017	Nidelv Cup	Trondheim, Norway	
Total	264 kg	Daniel Roness	12 April 2016	European Championships	Førde, Norway	
–77 kg
Snatch	136 kg	Roger Myrholt	24 October 2018		Zamość, Poland	
Clean & Jerk	177 kg	Roger Myrholt	24 October 2018		Zamość, Poland	
Total	313 kg	Roger Myrholt	24 October 2018		Zamość, Poland	
–85 kg
Snatch	142 kg	Ørjan Østhus	17 January 2004		Bergen, Norway	
Clean & Jerk	175 kg	Roger Myrholt	17 February 2018	Norwegian Championships	Naustdal, Norway	
Total	314 kg	Jarleif Amdal	6 March 2010	Norwegian Championships	Trondheim, Norway	
–94 kg
Snatch	152 kg	Per Hordnes	31 May 2008	Promotion Cup	Lausanne, Switzerland	
Clean & Jerk	187 kg	Per Hordnes	14 May 2008		Bergen, Norway	
Total	332 kg	Per Hordnes	21 October 2007	Nordic Championships	Hillerød, Denmark	
–105 kg
Snatch	156 kg	Geir Grønnevik	3 December 2005		Vigrestad, Norway	
Clean & Jerk	191 kg	Geir Grønnevik	3 December 2005		Vigrestad, Norway	
Total	347 kg	Geir Grønnevik	3 December 2005		Vigrestad, Norway	
+105 kg
Snatch	195 kg	Stian Grimseth	28 November 1999	World Championships	Athens, Greece	
Clean & Jerk	235 kg	Stian Grimseth	24 May 1999		Moscow, Russia	
Total	430 kg	Stian Grimseth	28 November 1999	World Championships	Athens, Greece	

=== Women (2025–2026) ===
Event	Record	Athlete	Date	Meet	Place	Ref
48 kg
Snatch	62 kg	Standard				
Clean & Jerk	80 kg	Standard				
Total	142 kg	Standard				
53 kg
Snatch	79 kg	Rebekka Tao Jacobsen	19 April 2026	European Championships	Batumi, Georgia	
Clean & Jerk	105 kg	Rebekka Tao Jacobsen	19 April 2026	European Championships	Batumi, Georgia	
Total	184 kg	Rebekka Tao Jacobsen	19 April 2026	European Championships	Batumi, Georgia	
58 kg
Snatch	86 kg	Ine Andersson	4 October 2025	World Championships	Førde, Norway	
Clean & Jerk	114 kg	Ine Andersson	4 October 2025	World Championships	Førde, Norway	
Total	200 kg	Ine Andersson	4 October 2025	World Championships	Førde, Norway	
63 kg
Snatch	84 kg	Standard				
Clean & Jerk	112 kg	Ine Andersson	23 August 2025		Naustdal, Norway	
Total	194 kg	Ine Andersson	23 August 2025		Naustdal, Norway	
69 kg
Snatch	94 kg	Julia Jordanger Loen	1 November 2025	European U23 Championships	Durrës, Albania	
Clean & Jerk	115 kg	Julia Jordanger Loen	7 October 2025	World Championships	Førde, Norway	
Total	207 kg	Julia Jordanger Loen	7 October 2025	World Championships	Førde, Norway	
77 kg
Snatch	93 kg	Standard				
Clean & Jerk	119 kg	Standard				
Total	212 kg	Standard				
86 kg
Snatch	120 kg	Solfrid Koanda	9 October 2025	World Championships	Førde, Norway	
Clean & Jerk	152 kg	Solfrid Koanda	9 October 2025	World Championships	Førde, Norway	
Total	272 kg	Solfrid Koanda	9 October 2025	World Championships	Førde, Norway	
+86 kg
Snatch	120 kg	Solfrid Koanda	23 August 2025		Naustdal, Norway	
Clean & Jerk	156 kg	Solfrid Koanda	26 April 2026	European Championships	Batumi, Georgia	
Total	275 kg	Solfrid Koanda	26 April 2026	European Championships	Batumi, Georgia	

=== Women (2018–2025) ===
Event	Record	Athlete	Date	Meet	Place	Ref
45 kg
Snatch	42 kg	Ingrid Skag Skjefstad	23 May 2025		Bergen, Norway	
Clean & Jerk	54 kg	Emine Tefre Grønnevik	4 July 2024		Naustdal, Norway	
Total	95 kg	Emine Tefre Grønnevik	26 May 2025		Naustdal, Norway	
49 kg
Snatch	56 kg	Sandra Nævdal			Vigrestad, Norway	
Clean & Jerk	74 kg	Kine Krøs	25 August 2023		Wieliczka, Poland	
Total	129 kg	Kine Krøs	25 August 2023		Wieliczka, Poland	
55 kg
Snatch	87 kg	Sol Anette Waaler	27 October 2023	Nordic Championships	Landskrona, Sweden	
Clean & Jerk	107 kg	Sol Anette Waaler	27 October 2023	Nordic Championships	Landskrona, Sweden	
Total	194 kg	Sol Anette Waaler	27 October 2023	Nordic Championships	Landskrona, Sweden	
59 kg
Snatch	90 kg	Ine Andersson	31 October 2020		Stavern, Norway	
Clean & Jerk	118 kg	Ine Andersson	30 May 2022	European Championships	Tirana, Albania	
Total	208 kg	Ine Andersson	30 May 2022	European Championships	Tirana, Albania	
64 kg
Snatch	94 kg	Marit Årdalsbakke	27 August 2021		Dubai, United Arab Emirates	
Clean & Jerk	121 kg	Ine Andersson	18 April 2023	European Championships	Yerevan, Armenia	
Total	208 kg	Ine Andersson	5 November 2022			
Total	212 kg	Ine Andersson	18 April 2023	European Championships	Yerevan, Armenia	
71 kg
Snatch	95 kg	Ruth Kasirye	3 March 2019	Norwegian Championships	Stavern, Norway	
Clean & Jerk	116 kg	Ruth Kasirye	10 April 2019	European Championships	Batumi, Georgia	
Total	210 kg	Ruth Kasirye	3 March 2019	Norwegian Championships	Stavern, Norway	
76 kg
Snatch	90 kg	Melissa Schanche	13 February 2021		Spydeberg, Norway	
Clean & Jerk	119 kg	Lea Berle Horne	5 March 2023		Trondheim, Norway	
Total	207 kg	Lea Berle Horne	5 March 2023		Trondheim, Norway	
81 kg
Snatch	121 kg	Solfrid Koanda	10 August 2024	Olympic Games	Paris, France	
Clean & Jerk	154 kg	Solfrid Koanda	10 August 2024	Olympic Games	Paris, France	
Total	275 kg	Solfrid Koanda	10 August 2024	Olympic Games	Paris, France	
87 kg
Snatch	123 kg	Solfrid Koanda	9 April 2024	World Cup	Phuket, Thailand	
Clean & Jerk	160 kg	Solfrid Koanda	19 February 2024	European Championships	Sofia, Bulgaria	
Total	280 kg	Solfrid Koanda	19 February 2024	European Championships	Sofia, Bulgaria	
+87 kg
Snatch	111 kg	Solfrid Koanda	8 February 2025		Speyer, Germany	
Clean & Jerk	148 kg	Solfrid Koanda	27 January 2024		Speyer, Germany	
Total	258 kg	Solfrid Koanda	27 January 2024		Speyer, Germany	

=== Women (1998–2018) ===
Event	Record	Athlete	Date	Meet	Place	Ref
–48 kg
Snatch	54 kg	Rebekka Tao Jacobsen	21 December 2013		Stavern, Norway	
Clean & Jerk	70 kg	Rebekka Tao Jacobsen	21 December 2013		Stavern, Norway	
Total	124 kg	Rebekka Tao Jacobsen	21 December 2013		Stavern, Norway	
–53 kg
Snatch	81 kg	Sarah Øvsthus	30 May 2018		Bergen, Norway	
Clean & Jerk	100 kg	Sarah Øvsthus	21 January 2018		Tysvær, Norway	
Total	181 kg	Sarah Øvsthus	30 May 2018		Bergen, Norway	
–58 kg
Snatch	94 kg	Ruth Kasirye	22 September 2007	World Championships	Chiang Mai, Thailand	
Clean & Jerk	117 kg	Ruth Kasirye	18 April 2007	European Championships	Strasbourg, France	
Total	210 kg	Ruth Kasirye	18 April 2007	European Championships	Strasbourg, France	
–63 kg
Snatch	107 kg	Ruth Kasirye	8 April 2009	European Championships	Bucharest, Romania	
Clean & Jerk	130 kg	Ruth Kasirye	7 March 2009	Norwegian Championships	Spydeberg, Norway	
Total	236 kg	Ruth Kasirye	7 March 2009	Norwegian Championships	Spydeberg, Norway	
–69 kg
Snatch	106 kg	Ruth Kasirye	27 June 2009	Baltic Cup	Pori, Finland	
Clean & Jerk	130 kg	Ruth Kasirye	23 May 2009	Eleiko Women Grand Prix	Lochen, Austria	
Total	236 kg	Ruth Kasirye	27 June 2009	Baltic Cup	Pori, Finland	
–75 kg
Snatch	105 kg	Ruth Kasirye	28 February 2015	Norwegian Championships	Spydeberg, Norway	
Clean & Jerk	129 kg	Ruth Kasirye	4 October 2014	AL-Bank Cup	Aalborg, Denmark	
Total	231 kg	Ruth Kasirye	4 October 2014	AL-Bank Cup	Aalborg, Denmark	
–90 kg
Snatch	88 kg	Melissa Schanche	20 October 2018		Gjøvik, Norway	
Clean & Jerk	106 kg	Lone Kalland	20 October 2018		Naustdal, Norway	
Total	191 kg	Melissa Schanche	20 October 2018		Gjøvik, Norway	
+90 kg
Snatch	105 kg	Standard				
Clean & Jerk	127 kg	Standard				
Total	232 kg	Standard				
