= Jørgen Barth-Jørgensen =

Norwegian weightlifter (1932–2021)

Personal information
- Full name: Jørgen Ludvig Barth-Jørgensen
- Nationality: Norwegian
- Born: 15 February 1932; Larvik, Norway
- Died: 6 December 2021 (aged 89); Hokksund, Øvre Eiker, Norway

Sport
- Sport: Weightlifting

Jørgen Ludvig Barth-Jørgensen (15 February 1932 – 6 December 2021) was a Norwegian weightlifter. Barth-Jørgensen started the sport in the 1940s and represented the Larvik Atletklubb, winning nine national titles and five Kongepokals during his local career. He would also hold multiple Norwegian and Nordic records in the sport.

Internationally, he competed at the 1952 Summer Olympics as one of the first Norwegian weightlifters to represent the nation at a Summer Games. He would place thirteenth in the men's middle heavyweight event. Later on, he would compete in three editions of the World Weightlifting Championships and an edition of the European Weightlifting Championships but would not medal in any of them. He later served as part of the "training board" for the Norwegian Weightlifting Federation and was inducted to its hall of fame.

== Biography ==
Jørgen Ludvig Barth-Jørgensen was born on 15 February 1932 in Larvik, Norway. He started weightlifting and weight training with his connections while competing for the sports club Larvik Atletklubb domestically during the 1940s. In his local career, he would win nine titles at the national championships from 1950 to 1958, additionally winning five Kongepokals at five editions of the competition.

Barth-Jørgensen competed at the 1952 Summer Olympics held in Helsinki, Finland, for his first appearance at the Olympic Games. He would be one of the first Norwegian weightlifters to compete at an edition of the Summer Games. There, he would compete in the men's middle heavyweight event for lifters that weighed 90 kilograms or less. He competed on 27 July against 19 other competitors. His total in the event would be 355.0 kilograms, placing him thirteenth in the event.

After the 1952 Summer Games, he would compete at the 1953, 1954 and 1958 World Weightlifting Championships, and the 1954 European Weightlifting Championships, but did not medal in any of the events. During his career, he would set multiple Norwegian and Nordic records in the sport. He later served as part of the "training board" for the Norwegian Weightlifting Federation for several years. Barth-Jørgensen died on 6 December 2021 in Hokksund, Øvre Eiker, Norway, and was inducted to the Federation's hall of fame.
