= Solfrid Koanda =

Norwegian weightlifter (born 1998)

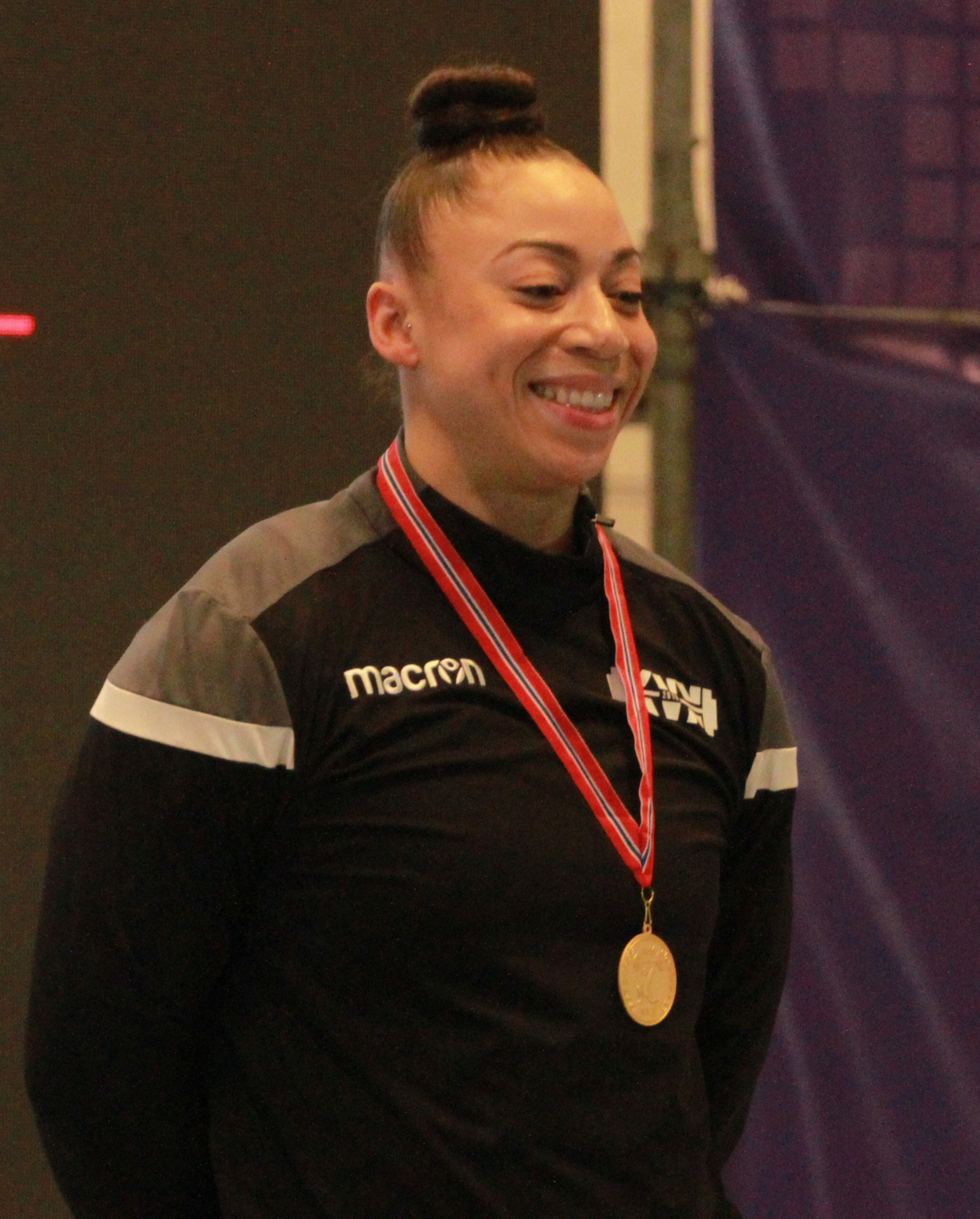
- Koanda in 2023

Personal information
- Full name: Solfrid Eila Amena Koanda
- Born: 13 November 1998 (age 27) Oulu, Finland
- Height: 1.66 m (5 ft 5 in)

Sport
- Country: Norway
- Sport: Weightlifting
- Weight class: 87 kg
- Club: Larvik Atletklubb
- Coached by: Stian Grimseth; Sindre Madsgaard; Thomas Eide
Medal record
Women's weightlifting
Representing Norway
Olympic Games
Gold medal – first place	2024 Paris	81 kg
World Championships
Gold medal – first place	2022 Bogotá	87 kg
Gold medal – first place	2025 Førde	86 kg
Bronze medal – third place	2021 Tashkent	87 kg
European Championships
Gold medal – first place	2022 Tirana	87 kg
Gold medal – first place	2023 Yerevan	87 kg
Gold medal – first place	2024 Sofia	87 kg
Gold medal – first place	2025 Chișinău	87 kg
Silver medal – second place	2026 Batumi	+86 kg

Solfrid Eila Amena Koanda (born 13 November 1998) is a Norwegian weightlifter and former electrician. She became the first female Norwegian weightlifter to become an Olympic champion, and the first Norwegian weightlifter to become World and European champion in the sport.

Born in Oulu, Finland, to a Finnish mother and an Ivorian father, she lived in Finland until moving to Norway at the age of nine. She struggled with self-confidence and usually trained alone in a weight room before being put into foster care and began training in CrossFit. She was then recruited into weightlifting by a CrossFit coach who trained both sports.

A few days after training in the sport, she qualified for her first competition where she then set a national record. Another local competition qualified her for the 2021 European Weightlifting Championships, where she then earned a bronze medal and set new national records. Later that same year, she competed at her first World Weightlifting Championships and earned a bronze medal as well.

Koanda has won four Kongepokals. She won the 2022, 2023, and 2024 European Weightlifting Championships, and also became the 2022 World Weightlifting Champion. At the 2024 Summer Olympics, she won the gold medal in her event and set new Olympic records, where she was then hailed as the Female Athlete of the Year at the 2025 Idrettsgallaen.

== Early life ==
Solfrid Eila Amena Koanda was born on 13 November 1998 to a Finnish mother and an Ivorian father in Oulu, Finland. When Koanda was nine years old, she and her family moved to Grimstad Municipality, Norway. In ungdomsskolen (lower secondary school), she commented that she struggled with self-confidence because of her appearance and greater muscle mass compared to others. Due to this, she often disregarded her friends' invitations to participate in football or handball and trained alone in a weight room instead.

She left her family at the age of fifteen and went into foster care; she began CrossFit training at this time. She moved out of her foster home at the age of eighteen.

== Career ==
=== 2020–2021 ===
Koanda began weightlifting in 2020 after she was recruited by a CrossFit coach. She qualified for her first competition a few days later for the women's 87 kg event. At the competition, the 2020 Norwegian Weightlifting Championships in Vigrestad, she placed second and set a new national record in the clean and jerk with 114 kg. In February 2021, she set new three national records in the 87 kg division with 96 kg in snatch, 125 kg in clean and jerk, and a total of 221 kg at an online competition hosted by CrossFit Blindleia in Lillesand Municipality. She qualified for the European Weightlifting Championships at this event.

Koanda made her international debut in April at the 2021 European Weightlifting Championships in Moscow, Russia, competing in the women's 87 kg event. She lifted 100 kg in the snatch, clean and jerked 135 kg for a new Nordic record and a bronze medal, and finished with a total of 235 kg for fifth place overall. Her following competition was the 2021 European Junior & U23 Weightlifting Championships in Rovaniemi, Finland. She snatched 103 kg, clean and jerked 140 kg, and finished with a total of 243 kg to earn the overall gold medal in the women's +87 kg event and set new national records.

In October, Koanda won her first Norwegian Championships, the 2021 Norwegian Weightlifting Championships which were held in Spydeberg, after winning the gold medal in her event. Two months later, she competed at her first world championships, the 2021 World Weightlifting Championships in Tashkent, Uzbekistan. She lifted 103 kg in the snatch, 141 kg in the clean and jerk and earned gold, and finished with a total of 244 kg for an overall bronze medal in the women's 87 kg event.

=== 2022–2023 ===
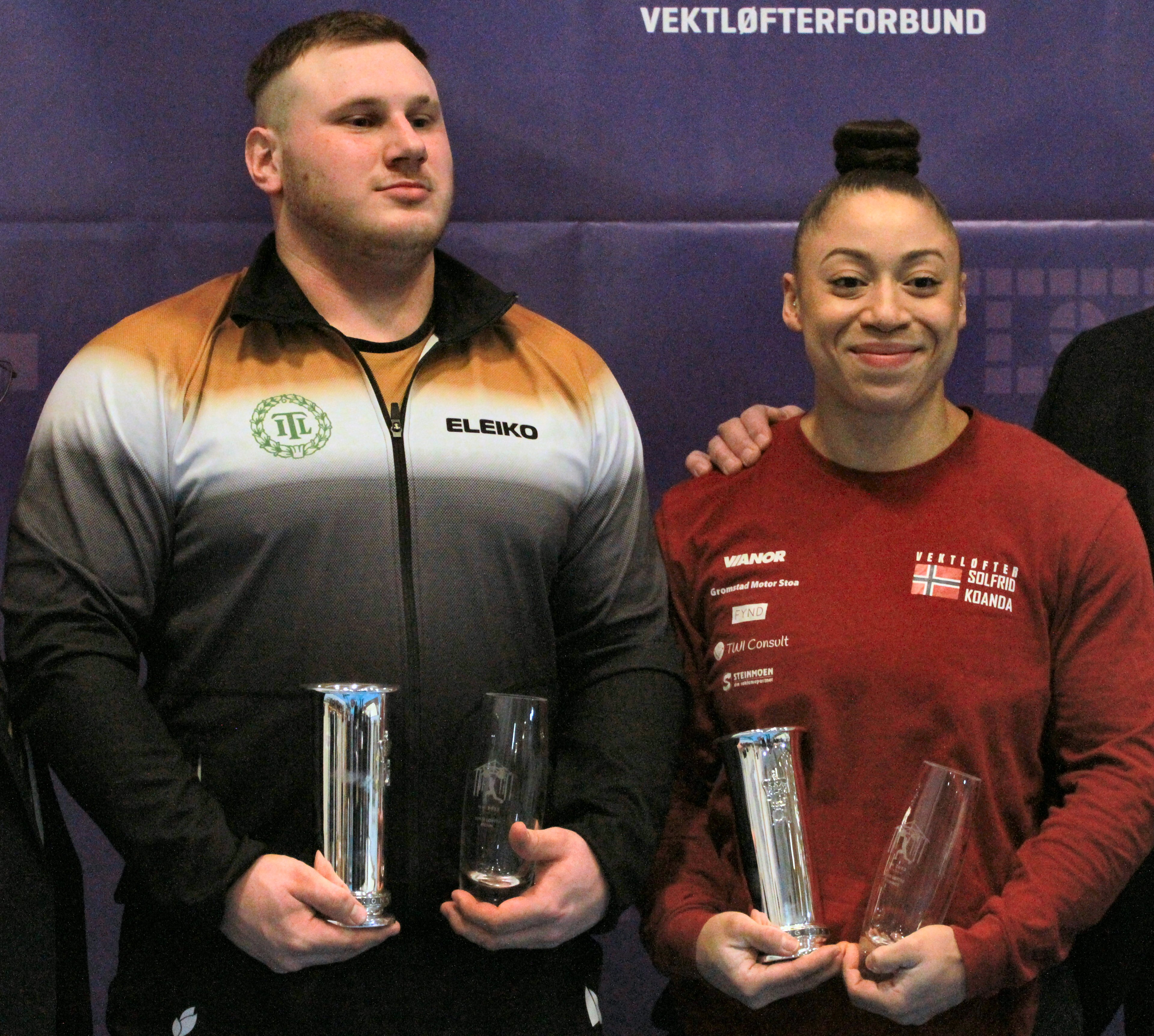
Koanda (right) holding her Kongepokal at the 2023 Norwegian Weightlifting Championships

Koanda was nominated for Female Athlete of the Year at the 2022 Idrettsgallaen in January. The award was won by skier Therese Johaug. Five months later, she competed at the 2022 European Weightlifting Championships in Tirana, Albania, in the women's 87 kg event. She lifted 109 kg in the snatch, 143 kg in the clean and jerk, and 252 kg in the total for all available gold medals, new national records for all lifts, and becoming the first Norwegian weightlifter to become European champion. She then won her first Kongepokal at the 2022 Norwegian Weightlifting Championships when she lifted 111 kg in the snatch, 145 kg in the clean and jerk, and 256 kg in the total for the gold medal and new national and Nordic records.

In August, Koanda suffered a stress fracture in her wrist which limited her training. She used a wooden stick to train before progressing to a barbell until November, a few weeks before the 2022 World Weightlifting Championships in Bogotá, Colombia. In the women's 87 kg event, she lifted 113 kg in the snatch, 147 kg in the clean and jerk, and 260 kg in the total, earning all of the available gold medals, setting new national records, and becoming the first Norwegian world champion in weightlifting. A month later, she was nominated again for Female Athlete of the Year at the Idrettsgallaen, where the title was given to Johaug. Two months later, she won her second Kongepokal at the 2023 Norwegian Weightlifting Championships in Trondheim when she snatched 115 kg, clean and jerked 150 kg, and finished with a total of 265 kg, earning the gold medal and setting new national and Nordic records.

In April, Koanda was nominated as the Best Weightlifter of the Year by the European Weightlifting Federation, where she won the award. Later that month, she retained her title in the women's 87 kg event at the 2023 European Championships held in Yerevan. She lifted 117 kg in the snatch, 155 kg in the clean and jerk, and 272 kg in the total for all available gold medals. It was her last competition before cutting weight for the 2023 IWF Grand Prix I in Havana, Cuba, where she competed in the women's 81 kg event to qualify for the 2024 Summer Olympics. She snatched 116 kg, clean and jerked 150 kg, and finished with a total of 266 kg for the overall gold medal. She then went on to compete at the 2023 World Weightlifting Championships in Riyadh to compete in the women's 87 kg event yet failed all of her lifts in the snatch and failed to register a total, yet won the gold medal in the clean and jerk with 156 kg.

=== 2024–present ===
Koanda opened up her 2024 season by competing at the 2024 European Weightlifting Championships in Sofia, Bulgaria, in the women's 87 kg event. She snatched 120 kg, clean and jerked 160 kg, and finished with a total of 280 kg for the overall gold medal. A month after the competition, she won her third Kongepokal at the 2024 Norwegian Weightlifting Championships. She then went on to compete at the 2024 IWF World Cup in Phuket, Thailand, in the women's 87 kg event, where she snatched 123 kg in the snatch for a new national and Nordic record, 152 kg in the clean and jerk, and finished with a total of 275 kg to win the overall gold medal.

At the 2024 Summer Olympics in Paris, France, she competed in the women's 81 kg event. She lifted 121 kg in the snatch, 154 kg in the clean and jerk, and finished with a total of 275 kg for the gold medal. She also set new Olympic records in clean and jerk and total, in addition to becoming the first Norwegian Olympic gold medalist in weightlifting since the 1972 Summer Olympics and the first Norwegian woman to win an individual Olympic gold medal at the Summer Games since the 2004 Summer Olympics. She was the Norwegian flag bearer at the 2024 Summer Olympics closing ceremony. Following her win, she won Female Athlete of the Year at the 2025 ceremony of the Idrettsgaellen. She won her fourth Kongepokal in March 2025 after winning in her event at the 2025 Norwegian Weightlifting Championships in Bergen.

== Personal life ==
Koanda possesses Finnish citizenship alongside her Norwegian citizenship. She worked as an apprentice before receiving a degree in electrotechnology, where she then worked as an electrician before becoming a full-time athlete towards the end of 2022. She has been dating and living with Damian Zielinski, an electrician whom she met at school in 2016. She currently lives in Grimstad and represents Larvik Atletklubb at local competitions.

== Achievements ==
Competition summary
Year	Venue	Weight	Snatch (kg)				Clean & Jerk (kg)				Total	Rank
Year	Venue	Weight	1	2	3	Rank	1	2	3	Rank	Total	Rank
Olympic Games
2024	Paris, France	81 kg	117	121	~~124~~	—N/a	148	154 OR	~~162~~	—N/a	275 OR	1st place, gold medalist(s)
World Championships
2021	Tashkent, Uzbekistan	87 kg	98	103	~~107~~	7	135	141	~~142~~	1st place, gold medalist(s)	244	3rd place, bronze medalist(s)
2022	Bogotá, Colombia	87 kg	108	110	113	1st place, gold medalist(s)	~~143~~	143	147	1st place, gold medalist(s)	260	1st place, gold medalist(s)
2023	Riyadh, Saudi Arabia	87 kg	~~115~~	~~115~~	~~115~~	—	140	150	156	1st place, gold medalist(s)	—	—
2025	Førde, Norway	86 kg	116	120	~~123~~	2nd place, silver medalist(s)	146	~~150~~	152	1st place, gold medalist(s)	272	1st place, gold medalist(s)
IWF World Cup
2024	Phuket, Thailand	87 kg	116	~~121~~	123	1st place, gold medalist(s)	152	~~158~~	~~158~~	1st place, gold medalist(s)	275	1st place, gold medalist(s)
European Championships
2021	Moscow, Russia	87 kg	95	100	~~104~~	8	125	130	135	3rd place, bronze medalist(s)	235	5
2022	Tirana, Albania	87 kg	103	107	109	1st place, gold medalist(s)	133	138	143	1st place, gold medalist(s)	252	1st place, gold medalist(s)
2023	Yerevan, Armenia	87 kg	~~110~~	110	117	1st place, gold medalist(s)	145	153	155	1st place, gold medalist(s)	272	1st place, gold medalist(s)
2024	Sofia, Bulgaria	87 kg	114	~~118~~	120	1st place, gold medalist(s)	148	155	160	1st place, gold medalist(s)	280	1st place, gold medalist(s)
2025	Chișinău, Moldova	87 kg	~~117~~	117	122	1st place, gold medalist(s)	145	—	—	1st place, gold medalist(s)	267	1st place, gold medalist(s)
2026	Batumi, Georgia	+86 kg	117	119	~~125~~	1st place, gold medalist(s)	148	152	156	2nd place, silver medalist(s)	275	2nd place, silver medalist(s)
