= Weightlifting at the 2026 Commonwealth Games – Women's 86 kg =

Weightlifting – Women's 86 kg at the 2026 Commonwealth Games
- Venue: Scottish Event Campus
- Dates: 29 July 2026
- Competitors: 11 from 11 nations
- Best lift total: 248 kg GR

Medalists
| gold medal | Eileen Cikamatana | Australia |
| silver medal | Madias Ngake | England |
| bronze medal | Rose Beaudoin | Canada |

The Women's 86 kg weightlifting event at the 2026 Commonwealth Games took place at the SEC Armadillo, Glasgow on 29 July 2026. Australia's Eileen Cikamatana won the gold medal ahead of Madias Ngake from England who took silver with Rose Beaudoin of Canada claiming the bronze.

== Qualification ==
A total of 176 weightlifters (88 per gender) qualify to compete at the Games. Nations may earn one quota per weight class, allocated as follows:

- Automatic Qualification – Host CGA (1 per event)
- Direct Qualification – 2025 Commonwealth Weightlifting Champions (1 per event)
- IWF Commonwealth Ranking List (Ranking Period: 01 June 2025 – 18 May 2026) (8 per event)
- Bipartite Invitation (1 per event)

The following lifters qualified in the Women's 86 kg class:

| Means of qualification | Quotas | Qualified |
|---|---|---|
| Host Nation | ~~1~~ 0 | ~~TBD (SCO)~~ |
| 2025 Commonwealth Championships | 1 | Eileen Cikamatana (AUS) |
| IWF Commonwealth Rankings | ~~8~~ 9 | Madias Ngake (ENG); Litia Nacagilevu (NZL); Rose Beaudoin (CAN); ~~Vanshita Verma (IND)~~; Nirupama Devi Seram (IND); Sefulu Seuao (SAM); ~~Miriama Taletawa (FIJ)~~; Ajah Pritchard Lolo (VAN); Mary Taiwo Osijo (NGR) |
| Bipartite Invitation | 1 | Chathurika Priyanthi (SRI) |
| Reallocated | 1 | Cheyenne Smith (RSA) |
| TOTAL | 10 | |

Hosts Scotland declined their automatic entry in this weight class.

== Schedule ==
All times are British Summer Time (UTC+1)

| Date | Time | Round |
|---|---|---|
| 29 July 2026 | 18:30 | Final |

== Competition ==
| Rank | Name | Country | Snatch (kg) | | | | Clean & Jerk (kg) | | | Result | Total | Notes |
| Rank | Name | Country | 1 | 2 | 3 | Result | 1 | 2 | 3 | Result | Total | Notes |
|---|---|---|---|---|---|---|---|---|---|---|---|---|
| 1st place, gold medalist(s) | Eileen Cikamatana | Australia | ~~108~~ | 108 | ~~112~~ | 108 | 134 | 140 | ~~146~~ | 140 GR | 248 | GR |
| 2nd place, silver medalist(s) | Madias Ngake | England | 108 | 111 | ~~111~~ | 111 GR | 128 | ~~133~~ | ~~135~~ | 128 | 239 | |
| 3rd place, bronze medalist(s) | Rose Beaudoin | Canada | 99 | 103 | ~~106~~ | 103 | 124 | ~~127~~ | 127 | 127 | 230 | |
| 4 | Litia Nacagilevu | New Zealand | ~~103~~ | 103 | ~~106~~ | 103 | ~~121~~ | 122 | ~~125~~ | 122 | 225 | |
| 5 | Mary Taiwo Osijo | Nigeria | ~~95~~ | 95 | 100 | 100 | 120 | 125 | ~~131~~ | 125 | 225 | |
| 6 | Sefulu Seuao | Samoa | ~~96~~ | 96 | ~~101~~ | 96 | 123 | ~~130~~ | ~~131~~ | 123 | 219 | |
| 7 | Ajah Pritchard Lolo | Vanuatu | ~~94~~ | 94 | 100 | 100 | 113 | 117 | ~~120~~ | 117 | 217 | |
| 8 | Juliana Ongonga | Kenya | ~~85~~ | 85 | ~~88~~ | 85 | 105 | 108 | ~~111~~ | 108 | 193 | |
| 9 | Chathurika Priyanthi Balage | Sri Lanka | 80 | ~~84~~ | ~~85~~ | 80 | 101 | 107 | ~~110~~ | 107 | 187 | |
| 10 | Cheyenne Smith | South Africa | 82 | 86 | ~~90~~ | 86 | 96 | 100 | ~~102~~ | 100 | 186 | |
