= 2025 World Weightlifting Championships – Women's 86 kg =

Women's 86 kg at the 2025 World Weightlifting Championships
- Venue: Førdehuset
- Location: Førde, Norway
- Dates: 9 October
- Winning total: 272 kg ER

Medalists
gold medal	Solfrid Koanda	Norway
silver medal	Yudelina Mejía	Dominican Republic
bronze medal	Eileen Cikamatana	Australia

The women's 86 kilograms competition at the 2025 World Weightlifting Championships was held on 9 October 2025.

== Schedule ==
Date	Time	Event
9 October 2025	10:00	Group C
9 October 2025	12:00	Group B
9 October 2025	17:00	Group A

== Records ==
Prior to this competition, the existing world records were as follows.

World record	Snatch	World Standard	129 kg	—	1 June 2025
World record	Clean & Jerk	World Standard	162 kg	—	1 June 2025
World record	Total	World Standard	289 kg	—	1 June 2025

== Results ==
Rank	Athlete	Group	Snatch (kg)				Clean & Jerk (kg)				Total
Rank	Athlete	Group	1	2	3	Rank	1	2	3	Rank	Total
1st place, gold medalist(s)	Solfrid Koanda (NOR)	A	116	120; ER	~~123~~	2nd place, silver medalist(s)	146	~~150~~	152; ER	1st place, gold medalist(s)	272 ER
2nd place, silver medalist(s)	Yudelina Mejía (DOM)	A	115	119	122	1st place, gold medalist(s)	145	149	~~153~~	2nd place, silver medalist(s)	271 AM
3rd place, bronze medalist(s)	Eileen Cikamatana (AUS)	A	~~112~~	112	~~115~~	4	140	~~146~~	~~146~~	3rd place, bronze medalist(s)	252
4	Rahma Ahmed (EGY)	B	107	112	115	3rd place, bronze medalist(s)	128	135	~~140~~	6	250
5	Wakana Nagashima (JPN)	A	102	106	108	9	130	135	138	4	246
6	Madias Nzesso (GBR)	A	~~111~~	111	~~116~~	5	130	134	~~137~~	7	245
7	Lo Ying-yuan (TPE)	A	110	~~113~~	~~113~~	6	135	~~138~~	~~138~~	8	245
8	Yun Ha-je (KOR)	B	103	106	~~108~~	10	136	~~141~~	~~143~~	5	242
9	Litia Nacagilevu (NZL)	B	103	106	109	8	124	128	131	10	240
10	Motoka Nakajima (JPN)	A	~~103~~	~~103~~	103	15	130	133	~~138~~	9	236
11	Arveta McElderry (USA)	B	101	104	106	13	124	~~128~~	129	13	235
12	Anastasiia Manievska (UKR)	B	103	106	~~109~~	11	128	~~132~~	~~132~~	15	234
13	Kelin Jiménez (ECU)	B	~~100~~	100	104	14	126	130	~~132~~	11	234
14	Emmy González (MEX)	B	~~98~~	98	101	16	127	130	~~132~~	12	231
15	Mariia Gruzdova (AIN)	C	95	~~100~~	100	17	~~120~~	120	125	16	225
16	Anne Vejsgaard Jensen (DEN)	B	100	103	106	12	116	~~119~~	~~119~~	19	222
17	Vanshita Verma (IND)	C	87	~~90~~	90	27	118	123	128	14	218
18	Ilke Lagrou (BEL)	C	91	95	98	20	114	119	~~123~~	17	217
19	Nikola Seničová (SVK)	C	~~96~~	96	99	19	117	~~122~~	~~122~~	18	216
20	Clémentine Meukeugni (WRT)	B	95	100	~~103~~	18	115	~~119~~	~~120~~	20	215
21	Eliška Šmigová (CZE)	C	87	~~91~~	93	22	114	~~119~~	~~119~~	21	207
22	Ajah Pritchard-Lolo (VAN)	C	90	93	96	21	~~108~~	108	~~115~~	23	204
23	Anna Zubko (AIN)	C	90	~~95~~	~~95~~	23	110	~~113~~	114	22	204
24	Juliana Ongonga (KEN)	C	~~80~~	~~80~~	80	25	100	~~105~~	~~105~~	24	180
—	Valeria Rivas (COL)	A	~~109~~	110	~~113~~	7	~~138~~	~~138~~	~~138~~	—	—
—	Jeanne Eyenga (CMR)	C	Did not start								
X	Deborah Alawode (CWF)	C	91	94	~~97~~	X	~~118~~	119	~~122~~	X	213
