= List of Papua New Guinean records in Olympic Weightlifting =

The following are the records of Papua New Guinea in Olympic weightlifting. Records are maintained in each weight class for the snatch lift, clean and jerk lift, and the total for both lifts by the Papua New Guinea Weightlifting Federation.

== Current records ==
=== Men ===
Event	Record	Athlete	Date	Meet	Place	Ref
60 kg
Snatch	96 kg	Bau Doura	27 April 2026	Oceania Championships	Apia, Samoa	
Clean & Jerk	130 kg	Bau Doura	27 April 2026	Oceania Championships	Apia, Samoa	
Total	226 kg	Bau Doura	27 April 2026	Oceania Championships	Apia, Samoa	
65 kg
Snatch	127 kg	Morea Baru	25 August 2025	Commonwealth Championships	Ahmedabad, India	
Clean & Jerk	165 kg	Morea Baru	25 August 2025	Commonwealth Championships	Ahmedabad, India	
Total	292 kg	Morea Baru	25 August 2025	Commonwealth Championships	Ahmedabad, India	
71 kg
Snatch	95 kg	Rarua Mavara	3 July 2025	Pacific Mini Games	Meyuns, Palau	
Clean & Jerk	120 kg	Rarua Mavara	3 July 2025	Pacific Mini Games	Meyuns, Palau	
Total	215 kg	Rarua Mavara	3 July 2025	Pacific Mini Games	Meyuns, Palau	
79 kg
Snatch						
Clean & Jerk						
Total						
88 kg
Snatch						
Clean & Jerk						
Total						
94 kg
Snatch						
Clean & Jerk						
Total						
110 kg
Snatch						
Clean & Jerk						
Total						
+110 kg
Snatch	130 kg	Steven Kari	5 July 2025	Pacific Mini Games	Meyuns, Palau	
Clean & Jerk	170 kg	Steven Kari	5 July 2025	Pacific Mini Games	Meyuns, Palau	
Total	300 kg	Steven Kari	5 July 2025	Pacific Mini Games	Meyuns, Palau	

=== Women ===
Event	Record	Athlete	Date	Meet	Place	Ref
48 kg
Snatch	63 kg	Thelma Toua	27 April 2026	Oceania Championships	Apia, Samoa	
Clean & Jerk	83 kg	Thelma Toua	27 April 2026	Oceania Championships	Apia, Samoa	
Total	146 kg	Thelma Toua	27 April 2026	Oceania Championships	Apia, Samoa	
53 kg
Snatch	73 kg	Dika Toua	28 April 2026	Oceania Championships	Apia, Samoa	
Clean & Jerk	95 kg	Dika Toua	28 April 2026	Oceania Championships	Apia, Samoa	
Total	168 kg	Dika Toua	28 April 2026	Oceania Championships	Apia, Samoa	
58 kg
Snatch						
Clean & Jerk						
Total						
63 kg
Snatch	70 kg	Kari Mea	29 April 2026	Oceania Championships	Apia, Samoa	
Clean & Jerk	96 kg	Kari Mea	3 July 2025	Pacific Mini Games	Meyuns, Palau	
Total	165 kg	Kari Mea	29 April 2026	Oceania Championships	Apia, Samoa	
69 kg
Snatch						
Clean & Jerk						
Total						
77 kg
Snatch						
Clean & Jerk						
Total						
86 kg
Snatch						
Clean & Jerk	101 kg	Noi Igo	3 July 2025	Pacific Mini Games	Meyuns, Palau	
Total						
+86 kg
Snatch						
Clean & Jerk						
Total						

== Historical records ==
=== Men (2018–2025) ===
Event	Record	Athlete	Date	Meet	Place	Ref
55 kg
Snatch						
Clean & Jerk						
Total						
61 kg
Snatch	124 kg	Morea Baru	7 February 2019	EGAT Cup	Chiang Mai, Thailand	
Clean & Jerk	163 kg	Morea Baru	27 April 2019	Arafura Games	Darwin, Australia	
Total	284 kg	Morea Baru	10 July 2019	Pacific Games	Apia, Samoa	
67 kg
Snatch						
Clean & Jerk						
Total						
73 kg
Snatch						
Clean & Jerk						
Total						
81 kg
Snatch						
Clean & Jerk						
Total						
89 kg
Snatch						
Clean & Jerk						
Total						
96 kg
Snatch						
Clean & Jerk						
Total						
102 kg
Snatch						
Clean & Jerk						
Total						
109 kg
Snatch						
Clean & Jerk						
Total						
+109 kg
Snatch						
Clean & Jerk						
Total						

=== Men (1998–2018) ===
Event	Record	Athlete	Date	Meet	Place	Ref
56 kg
Snatch						
Clean & Jerk						
Total						
62 kg
Snatch	129 kg	Morea Baru	5 December 2017	Pacific Mini Games	Port Vila, Vanuatu	
Clean & Jerk	164 kg	Morea Baru	8 August 2016	Olympic Games	Rio de Janeiro, Brazil	
Total	290 kg	Morea Baru	8 August 2016	Olympic Games	Rio de Janeiro, Brazil	
69 kg
Snatch	120 kg	Fred Oala	24 May 2016	Oceania Championships	Suva, Fiji	
Clean & Jerk	158 kg	Fred Oala	24 May 2016	Oceania Championships	Suva, Fiji	
Total	278 kg	Fred Oala	24 May 2016	Oceania Championships	Suva, Fiji	
77 kg
Snatch	127 kg	Toua Udia	6 December 2017	Pacific Mini Games	Port Vila, Vanuatu	
Clean & Jerk	172 kg	Toua Udia	6 December 2017	Pacific Mini Games	Port Vila, Vanuatu	
Total	299 kg	Toua Udia	6 December 2017	Pacific Mini Games	Port Vila, Vanuatu	
85 kg
Snatch						
Clean & Jerk						
Total						
94 kg
Snatch	155 kg	Steven Kari	7 December 2017	Pacific Mini Games	Port Vila, Vanuatu	
Clean & Jerk	216 kg	Steven Kari	8 April 2018	Commonwealth Games	Gold Coast, Australia	
Total	370 kg	Steven Kari	8 April 2018	Commonwealth Games	Gold Coast, Australia	
105 kg
Snatch						
Clean & Jerk						
Total						
+105 kg
Snatch						
Clean & Jerk						
Total						

=== Women (2018–2025) ===
Event	Record	Athlete	Date	Meet	Place	Ref
45 kg
Snatch						
Clean & Jerk						
Total						
49 kg
Snatch	78 kg	Dika Toua	15 December 2018	Pacific Cup	Le Mont-Dore, New Caledonia	
Clean & Jerk	107 kg	Dika Toua	15 December 2018	Pacific Cup	Le Mont-Dore, New Caledonia	
Total	185 kg	Dika Toua	15 December 2018	Pacific Cup	Le Mont-Dore, New Caledonia	
55 kg
Snatch						
Clean & Jerk						
Total						
59 kg
Snatch						
Clean & Jerk						
Total						
64 kg
Snatch						
Clean & Jerk						
Total						
71 kg
Snatch						
Clean & Jerk						
Total						
76 kg
Snatch						
Clean & Jerk						
Total						
81 kg
Snatch						
Clean & Jerk						
Total						
87 kg
Snatch						
Clean & Jerk						
Total						
+87 kg
Snatch						
Clean & Jerk						
Total						

=== Women (1998–2018) ===
Event	Record	Athlete	Date	Meet	Place	Ref
48 kg
Snatch	75 kg	Thelma Toua	17 December 2016	Pacific Cup	Le Mont-Dore, New Caledonia	
Clean & Jerk	93 kg	Thelma Toua	17 March 2017	Australian Commonwealth Games Qualification Event	Melbourne, Australia	
Total	167 kg	Thelma Toua	17 December 2016	Pacific Cup	Le Mont-Dore, New Caledonia	
53 kg
Snatch	87 kg	Dika Toua	23 May 2008		Nouméa, New Caledonia	
Clean & Jerk	114 kg	Dika Toua	9 September 2005		Sigatoka, Fiji	
Total	200 kg	Dika Toua	9 September 2005		Sigatoka, Fiji	
58 kg
Snatch						
Clean & Jerk						
Total						
63 kg
Snatch						
Clean & Jerk						
Total						
69 kg
Snatch						
Clean & Jerk						
Total						
75 kg
Snatch						
Clean & Jerk						
Total						
90 kg
Snatch	89 kg	Lorraine Harry	9 April 2018	Commonwealth Games	Gold Coast, Australia	
Clean & Jerk	115 kg	Lorraine Harry	9 April 2018	Commonwealth Games	Gold Coast, Australia	
Total	204 kg	Lorraine Harry	9 April 2018	Commonwealth Games	Gold Coast, Australia	
+90 kg
Snatch						
Clean & Jerk						
Total						
