= 2022 World Weightlifting Championships – Women's 87 kg =

The women's 87 kilograms competition at the 2022 World Weightlifting Championships was held on 14 December 2022.

== Schedule ==
Date	Time	Event
14 December 2022	11:30	Group B
14 December 2022	19:00	Group A

== Medalists ==
Event	Gold		Silver		Bronze	
Snatch	Solfrid Koanda (NOR)	113 kg	Tursunoy Jabborova (UZB)	112 kg	Eileen Cikamatana (AUS)	109 kg
Clean & Jerk	Solfrid Koanda (NOR)	147 kg	Mönkhjantsangiin Ankhtsetseg (MGL)	143 kg	Eileen Cikamatana (AUS)	140 kg
Total	Solfrid Koanda (NOR)	260 kg	Eileen Cikamatana (AUS)	249 kg	Tursunoy Jabborova (UZB)	241 kg

== Records ==
Prior to this competition, the existing world records were as follows.

World Record	Snatch	World Standard	132 kg	—	1 November 2018
World Record	Clean & Jerk	World Standard	164 kg	—	1 November 2018
World Record	Total	World Standard	294 kg	—	1 November 2018

== Results ==
Rank	Athlete	Group	Snatch (kg)				Clean & Jerk (kg)				Total
Rank	Athlete	Group	1	2	3	Rank	1	2	3	Rank	Total
1st place, gold medalist(s)	Solfrid Koanda (NOR)	A	108	110	113	1st place, gold medalist(s)	~~143~~	143	147	1st place, gold medalist(s)	260
2nd place, silver medalist(s)	Eileen Cikamatana (AUS)	A	109	~~111~~	~~111~~	3rd place, bronze medalist(s)	140	~~148~~	~~148~~	3rd place, bronze medalist(s)	249
3rd place, bronze medalist(s)	Tursunoy Jabborova (UZB)	A	107	110	112	2nd place, silver medalist(s)	125	129	~~131~~	8	241
4	Hripsime Khurshudyan (ARM)	A	103	~~107~~	108	4	127	130	~~134~~	6	238
5	Samar Said (EGY)	A	104	~~108~~	~~109~~	6	126	~~130~~	130	7	234
6	Anastasiia Manievska (UKR)	A	~~104~~	~~104~~	104	8	126	~~129~~	129	9	233
7	Dayana Mina (ECU)	B	99	102	~~105~~	10	125	130	~~134~~	5	232
8	Juliana Riotto (USA)	A	98	101	~~104~~	11	124	~~127~~	~~127~~	10	225
9	Anne Vejsgaard Jensen (DEN)	B	88	94	100	12	106	107	115	12	215
10	Zeinab Sheikh (IRI)	B	85	~~90~~	90	13	~~115~~	116	~~121~~	11	206
—	Kim I-seul (KOR)	A	~~105~~	107	~~109~~	5	~~135~~	~~135~~	~~135~~	—	—
—	Lo Ying-yuan (TPE)	A	104	~~108~~	~~108~~	7	~~128~~	~~128~~	~~128~~	—	—
—	Tian Chia-hsin (TPE)	A	100	~~103~~	103	9	~~130~~	~~130~~	~~130~~	—	—
—	Mönkhjantsangiin Ankhtsetseg (MGL)	A	~~110~~	~~111~~	~~111~~	—	138	143	~~148~~	2nd place, silver medalist(s)	—
—	Yeinny Geles (COL)	A	~~107~~	~~109~~	~~109~~	—	130	135	~~139~~	4	—
—	Aiym Yeszhanova (KAZ)	B	~~80~~	~~81~~	~~81~~	—	—	—	—	—	—
—	Yvgeni Henderson (JAM)	B	Did not start								
