= Weightlifting at the 2022 Commonwealth Games – Women's 87 kg =

Weightlifting championship

Weightlifting – Women's 87 kg at the 2022 Commonwealth Games
- Venue: National Exhibition Centre
- Dates: 2 August
- Competitors: 11 from 11 nations
- Winning total: 255 kg

Medalists
gold medal	Eileen Cikamatana	Australia
silver medal	Kristel Ngarlem	Canada
bronze medal	Mary Osijo	Nigeria

The women's 87 kg weightlifting event at the 2022 Commonwealth Games took place at the National Exhibition Centre on 2 August 2022. The weightlifter from Australia won the gold, with a combined lift of 255 kg.

== Records ==
Prior to this competition, the existing World, Commonwealth and Games records were as follows:
When the previous records and weight classes were discarded following readjustment, the IWF defined "world standards" as the minimum lifts needed to qualify as world records (WR), CommonWealth Authority defined "Commonwealth standards" and "Commonwealth games standards" as the minimum lifts needed to qualify as Commonwealth record (CR) and Commonwealth games record (GR) in the new weight classes. Wherever World Standard/Commonwealth Standard/Commonwealth Games Standard appear in the list below, no qualified weightlifter has yet lifted the benchmark weights in a sanctioned competition.

World record	Snatch	World Standard	132 kg		
World record	Clean & Jerk	World Standard	164 kg		
World record	Total	World Standard	294 kg		
Commonwealth record	Snatch	Eileen Cikamatana (AUS)	115 kg	Lima, Peru	10 October 2019
Commonwealth record	Clean & Jerk	Eileen Cikamatana (AUS)	152 kg	Tianjin, China	10 December 2019
Commonwealth record	Total	Eileen Cikamatana (AUS)	266 kg	Tianjin, China	10 December 2019
Games record	Snatch	Commonwealth Games Standard	108 kg		
Games record	Clean & Jerk	Commonwealth Games Standard	135 kg		
Games record	Total	Commonwealth Games Standard	242 kg		

The following records were established during the competition:

Snatch	110 kg	Eileen Cikamatana (AUS)	GR
Clean & Jerk	145 kg	Eileen Cikamatana (AUS)	GR
Total	255 kg	Eileen Cikamatana (AUS)	GR

== Schedule ==
All times are British Summer Time (UTC+1)

Date	Time	Round
Tuesday 2 August 2022	18:30	Final

== Results ==
Rank	Athlete	Body weight (kg)	Snatch (kg)				Clean & Jerk (kg)				Total
Rank	Athlete	Body weight (kg)	1	2	3	Result	1	2	3	Result	Total
1st place, gold medalist(s)	Eileen Cikamatana (AUS)	84.08	105	110	~~113~~	110 GR	129	137	145	145 GR	255 GR
2nd place, silver medalist(s)	Kristel Ngarlem (CAN)	82.03	97	101	~~103~~	101	125	130	135	135	236
3rd place, bronze medalist(s)	Mary Osijo (NGR)	82.52	95	100	102	102	116	120	123	123	225
4	Clémentine Meukeugni (CMR)	86.11	97	100	~~102~~	100	118	121	—	121	221
5	Hayley Whiting (NZL)	82.97	93	~~97~~	~~98~~	93	~~116~~	116	~~121~~	116	209
6	Usha Kumara (IND)	86.29	90	95	~~98~~	95	110	~~116~~	~~116~~	110	205
7	Chathurika Balage (SRI)	85.20	81	~~86~~	~~86~~	81	105	111	~~114~~	111	192
8	Ajah Pritchard-Lolo (VAN)	84.56	73	~~78~~	78	78	93	97	100	100	178
9	Romentha Larue (SEY)	84.53	75	78	~~81~~	78	93	~~98~~	98	98	176
10	Yvgeni Henderson (JAM)	85.23	73	~~76~~	~~77~~	73	90	~~95~~	~~98~~	90	163
—	Emily Sweeney (ENG)	85.60	~~88~~	~~88~~	~~88~~	NM	—	—	—	—	DNF
