= Fillan Church =

Church in Trøndelag, Norway

- Fillan kirke
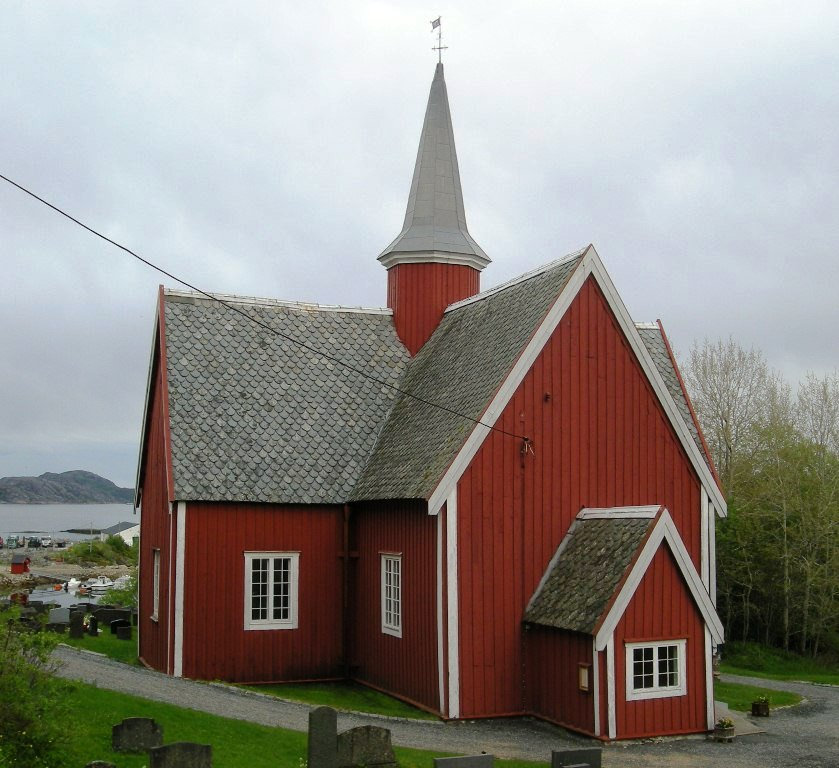
- View of the church
- Fillan Church
- 63.607343064°N 08.9746928215°E
- Location: Hitra Municipality, Trøndelag
- Country: Norway
- Denomination: Church of Norway
- Churchmanship: Evangelical Lutheran

History
- Status: Parish church
- Founded: 13th century
- Consecrated: 16 September 1789

Architecture
- Functional status: Active
- Architect: F. Bertelsen Ødegaard
- Architectural type: Cruciform
- Completed: 1789 (237 years ago)

Specifications
- Capacity: 400
- Materials: Wood

Administration
- Diocese: Nidaros bispedømme
- Deanery: Orkdal prosti
- Parish: Hitra og Fillan
- Norwegian Cultural Heritage Site
- Type: Church
- Status: Automatically protected
- ID: 84133

Fillan Church (Norwegian: Fillan kirke) is a parish church of the Church of Norway in Hitra Municipality in Trøndelag county, Norway. It is located in the village of Fillan on the east coast of the island of Hitra. It is one of the churches for the Hitra og Fillan parish which is part of the Orkdal prosti (deanery) in the Diocese of Nidaros. The red, wooden church was built in a cruciform design in 1789 using plans drawn up by the architect Fredrich Bertelsen Ødegaard. The church seats about 400 people.

== History ==
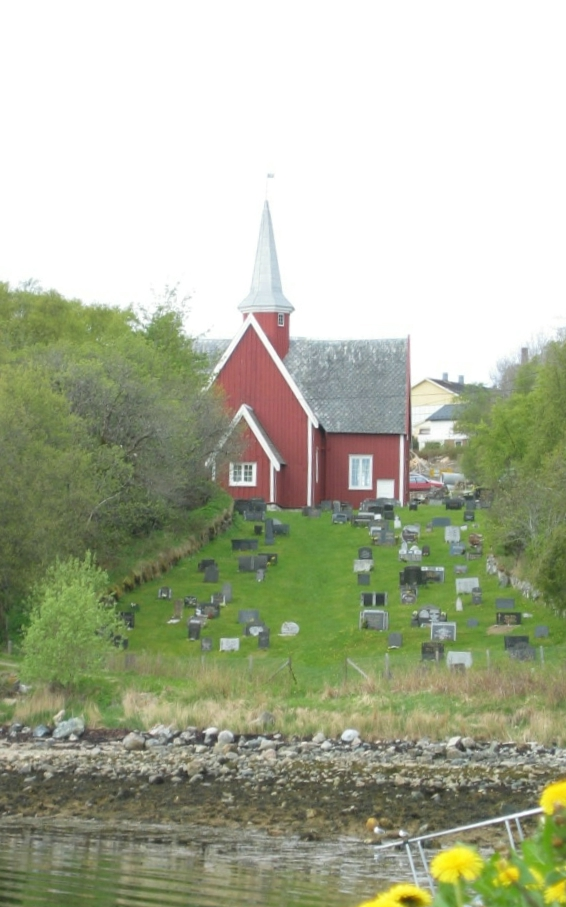
View of the church

The earliest existing historical records of the church date back to the year 1432, but the church was built before that time. The first church for Fillan was located at Ulvan on the island of Ulvøya and it was likely built during the 1200s, before the Black Death in Norway. The building was a wooden stave church that measured approximately 14 by 7 metres (46 ft × 23 ft). Records show that the wind vane blew down and had to be repaired in the 1640s, and in 1659 lightning struck the tower which also had to be repaired.

The population on the island of Hitra greatly increased during the 17th century and towards the end of that century, it was decided to move the Fillan Church site from Ulvan to the village of Fillan on the main island of Hitra about 8 kilometres (5.0 mi) to the southwest. In 1686, the old church was torn down and replaced with a new building on the same site. In 1780, the church was described by the parish priest, Bang, as being old, low, narrow, and dark, and that the indoor air during the sermons was unbearable because of the many unhealthy fumes from the clothing worn by the local fishermen. In 1789, the old church was torn down and a new cruciform church built on the same site. The new church was consecrated on 16 September 1789, which makes it the oldest existing church on the island of Hitra.

The church got its first organ in 1923, but the current organ was built by Eystein Gangfløt in 1984. The church also has an old painting "The Vision of Christian the Fourth", which was hidden in the church attic for many years and was restored in 1927.

== See also ==
- List of churches in Nidaros
