= Wu Yan (weightlifter) =

Chinese weightlifter (born 2001)

Personal information
- Born: 20 October 2001 (age 24)

Sport
- Country: China
- Sport: Weightlifting
- Weight class: 86 kg
Medal record
Women's weightlifting
Representing China
World Championships
| Gold medal – first place | 2024 Manama | 87 kg |
Asian Games
| Gold medal – first place | 2026 Aichi–Nagoya | 86 kg |
Asian Championships
| Gold medal – first place | 2025 Jiangshan | 81 kg |

Wu Yan (Chinese: 吴艳; born 20 October 2001) is a Chinese weightlifter. She is a World champion and Asian champion.

== Career ==
Wu joined the weightlifting team at the Changzhou Sports School in February 2013. She competed at the 2022 National Women's Weightlifting Championships and swept all three gold medals in the 81 kg event. She broke three national records with a snatch of 119 kg, a clean and jerk of 150 kg, and a total of 269 kg. She again won gold at the 2023 National Championships, where she also set a new national record in the snatch.

In December 2024, she competed at the 2024 World Weightlifting Championships and won a gold medal in the 87 kg event with a total lift of 272 kg. She opened the event with 122 kg in the snatch, and followed it up with 150 kg in the clean and jerk.

In May 2025, she competed at the 2025 Asian Weightlifting Championships and won a gold medal in the 81 kg event with snatch of 116 kg, a clean and jerk of 147 kg, and a total of 263 kg.

After competing at 81 kg, she moved to a new weight class for the 2028 Summer Olympics cycle, competing at 86 kg. In September 2026, she competed at the 2026 Asian Games and won a gold medal in the 86 kg event with a snatch of 124 kg, a clean and jerk of 149 kg, and a total of 273 kg.
