= 2024 World Weightlifting Championships – Women's 87 kg =

Women's 87 kg at the 2024 World Weightlifting Championships
- Venue: Weightlifting Marquee Venue
- Location: Manama, Bahrain
- Dates: 14 December
- Competitors: 24 from 20 nations
- Winning total: 272 kg

Medalists
gold medal	Wu Yan	China
silver medal	Eileen Cikamatana	Australia
bronze medal	Kim Yong-ju	North Korea

The women's 87 kilograms competition at the 2024 World Weightlifting Championships was held on 14 December 2024.

== Schedule ==
Date	Time	Event
14 December 2024	11:00	Group C
14 December 2024	15:30	Group B
14 December 2024	20:00	Group A

== Records ==
Prior to this competition, the existing world records were as follows.

World record	Snatch	World Standard	132 kg	—	1 November 2018
World record	Clean & Jerk	World Standard	164 kg	—	1 November 2018
World record	Total	World Standard	294 kg	—	1 November 2018

== Results ==
Rank	Athlete	Group	Snatch (kg)				Clean & Jerk (kg)				Total
Rank	Athlete	Group	1	2	3	Rank	1	2	3	Rank	Total
1st place, gold medalist(s)	Wu Yan (CHN)	A	115	120	122	1st place, gold medalist(s)	143	148	150	1st place, gold medalist(s)	272
2nd place, silver medalist(s)	Eileen Cikamatana (AUS)	A	113	~~117~~	~~117~~	3rd place, bronze medalist(s)	~~144~~	144	~~149~~	2nd place, silver medalist(s)	257
3rd place, bronze medalist(s)	Kim Yong-ju (PRK)	A	108	112	~~115~~	5	138	~~143~~	144	3rd place, bronze medalist(s)	256
4	Rahma Ahmed (EGY)	A	108	~~112~~	113	4	126	132	136	7	249
5	Xu Linyue (CHN)	A	98	102	105	13	137	141	~~145~~	5	246
6	Lo Ying-yuan (TPE)	B	105	110	~~113~~	6	~~128~~	130	135	8	245
7	Dayana Chirinos (VEN)	A	~~102~~	102	~~105~~	16	135	140	143	4	245
8	Madias Nzesso (GBR)	A	111	114	~~117~~	2nd place, silver medalist(s)	130	~~134~~	~~135~~	10	244
9	Yun Ha-je (KOR)	B	98	101	~~104~~	17	130	~~136~~	136	6	237
10	Jang Hyeon-ju (KOR)	B	100	105	~~109~~	11	125	~~131~~	131	9	236
11	Tursunoy Jabborova (UZB)	A	106	~~110~~	110	7	125	~~129~~	~~130~~	14	235
12	Anastasiia Manievska (UKR)	B	101	104	~~106~~	14	124	127	~~129~~	11	231
13	Tatev Hakobyan (ARM)	A	102	105	~~108~~	12	125	~~130~~	~~132~~	13	230
14	Darya Kheidzer (AIN)	C	100	105	107	8	115	120	~~125~~	16	227
15	Kayla Kass (USA)	B	99	~~102~~	103	15	123	~~128~~	~~129~~	15	226
16	Veronika Mitykó (HUN)	C	100	104	106	9	114	118	~~120~~	19	224
17	Sarah Barnett (USA)	B	95	~~98~~	~~99~~	19	~~126~~	127	~~130~~	12	222
18	Medea Jones (NZL)	C	98	102	105	10	116	~~120~~	~~120~~	21	221
19	Anne Vejsgaard Jensen (DEN)	B	100	~~104~~	~~104~~	18	115	118	~~122~~	20	218
20	María Fernanda Valdés (CHI)	C	~~93~~	93	~~96~~	20	~~120~~	~~120~~	120	18	213
21	Jeanne Eyenga (CMR)	C	85	~~89~~	~~89~~	23	112	116	120	17	205
22	Lenka Žembová (SVK)	C	90	~~93~~	~~94~~	21	113	~~116~~	~~116~~	22	203
23	Eliška Šmigová (CZE)	C	84	88	~~92~~	22	~~109~~	109	~~116~~	23	197
—	Nikola Seničová (SVK)	C	—	—	—	—	—	—	—	—	—
—	Elham Hosseini (IRI)	B	Did not start								
