= Weightlifting at the 2026 Asian Games – Women's 86 kg =

Women's 86 kg at the 2026 Asian Games
- Venue: Nagoya Trade & Industry Center
- Date: 29 September 2026
- Competitors: 8 from 8 nations

Medalists
gold medal	Wu Yan	China
silver medal	Alina Marushchak	Bahrain
bronze medal	Mahsa Beheshti	Iran

The women's 86 kilograms competition at the 2026 Asian Games was held on 29 September 2026 at the Nagoya Trade & Industry Center.

== Schedule ==
All times are Japan Standard Time (UTC+09:00)

Date	Time	Event
Tuesday, 29 September 2026	09:30	Group A

== Records ==
Prior to this competition, the existing world, Asian and Games records were as follows.

World Record	Snatch	World Standard	129 kg	—	1 June 2025
World Record	Clean & Jerk	World Standard	162 kg	—	1 June 2025
World Record	Total	World Standard	289 kg	—	1 June 2025
Asian Record	Snatch	Asian Standard	128 kg	—	1 June 2025
Asian Record	Clean & Jerk	Asian Standard	161 kg	—	1 June 2025
Asian Record	Total	Asian Standard	287 kg	—	1 June 2025
Games Record	Snatch	Asian Games Standard	125 kg	—	1 August 2026
Games Record	Clean & Jerk	Asian Games Standard	158 kg	—	1 August 2026
Games Record	Total	Asian Games Standard	281 kg	—	1 August 2026

== Results ==
Rank	Athlete	Group	Snatch (kg)				Clean & Jerk (kg)				Total
Rank	Athlete	Group	1	2	3	Result	1	2	3	Result	Total
1st place, gold medalist(s)	Wu Yan (CHN)	A	117	121	124	124	143	149	—	149	273
2nd place, silver medalist(s)	Alina Marushchak (BRN)	A	116	121	124	124	136	142	148	148	272
3rd place, bronze medalist(s)	Mahsa Beheshti (IRI)	A	~~108~~	108	113	113	~~141~~	146	~~149~~	146	259
4	Anamjan Rustamowa (TKM)	A	110	113	116	116	~~142~~	142	~~147~~	142	258
5	Jeon Hee-soo (KOR)	A	103	~~107~~	107	107	~~137~~	137	141	141	248
6	Wakana Nagashima (JPN)	A	102	107	111	111	132	~~137~~	~~137~~	132	243
7	Aiganym Zhanbolat (KAZ)	A	~~99~~	99	102	102	120	125	130	130	232
8	Lkhagvajavyn Bolortuyaa (MGL)	A	94	97	~~100~~	97	123	128	~~132~~	128	225
