= Fillan, Norway =

Village in Hitra Municipality, Norway

Fillan
- Village
- Interactive map of Fillan
- Location within Trøndelag Location within Norway
- Coordinates: 63.6063°N 08.9696°E
- Country: Norway
- Region: Central Norway
- County: Trøndelag
- District: Fosen
- Municipality: Hitra Municipality

Area
  - Total: 1.18 km^{2} (0.46 sq mi)
- Elevation: 35 m (115 ft)

Population (2024)
  - Total: 1,388
  - Density: 1,176/km^{2} (3,050/sq mi)
- Time zone: UTC+01:00 (CET)
  - Summer (DST): UTC+02:00 (CEST)
- Post Code: 7240 Hitra

Fillan is the administrative centre of Hitra Municipality in Trøndelag county, Norway. The village is located on the northeastern side of the island of Hitra, about 5 kilometres (3.1 mi) south of the village of Ansnes. The island of Fjellværsøya lies about 3 kilometres (1.9 mi) to the northeast, across the Fillfjorden.

The 1.18-square-kilometre (290-acre) village has a population (2024) of 1,388 and a population density of 1,176 inhabitants per square kilometre (3,050/sq mi).

== History ==
The village was the administrative centre of the old Fillan Municipality which existed from 1886 until 1964.

One of two branches of Guri Kunna Upper Secondary School is located in the village, as is Fillan Church (built in 1789).

== Media gallery ==
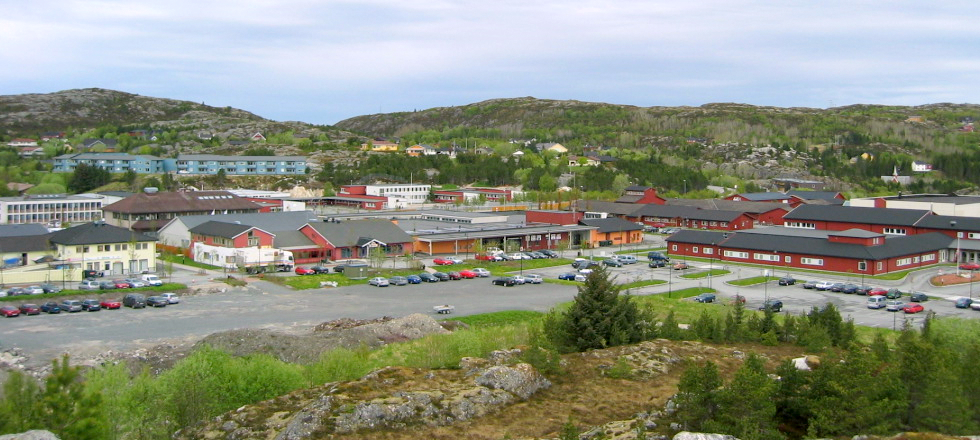
View of Fillan

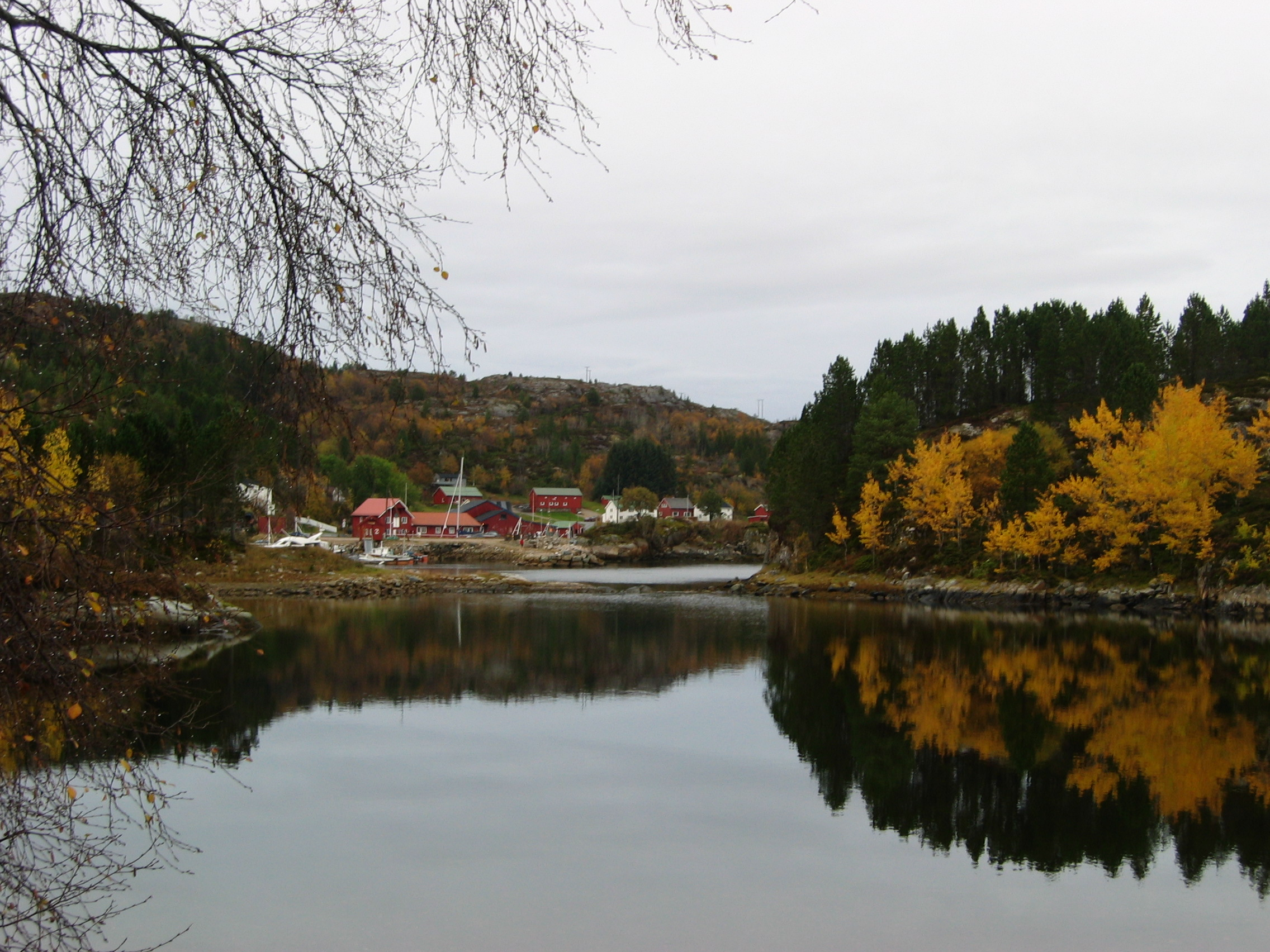
View of Fillan

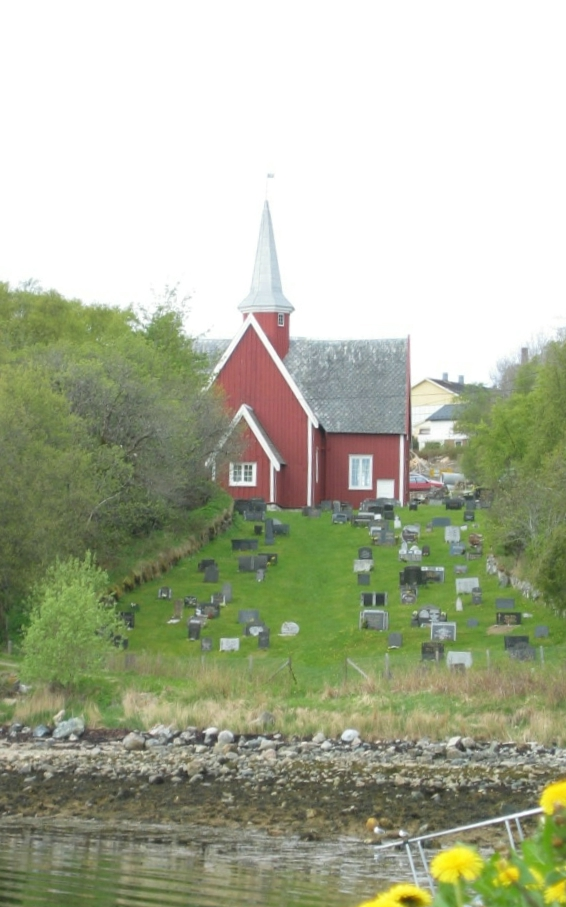
Fillan Church
