= Clémentine Meukeugni =

Cameroonian weightlifter (born 1990)

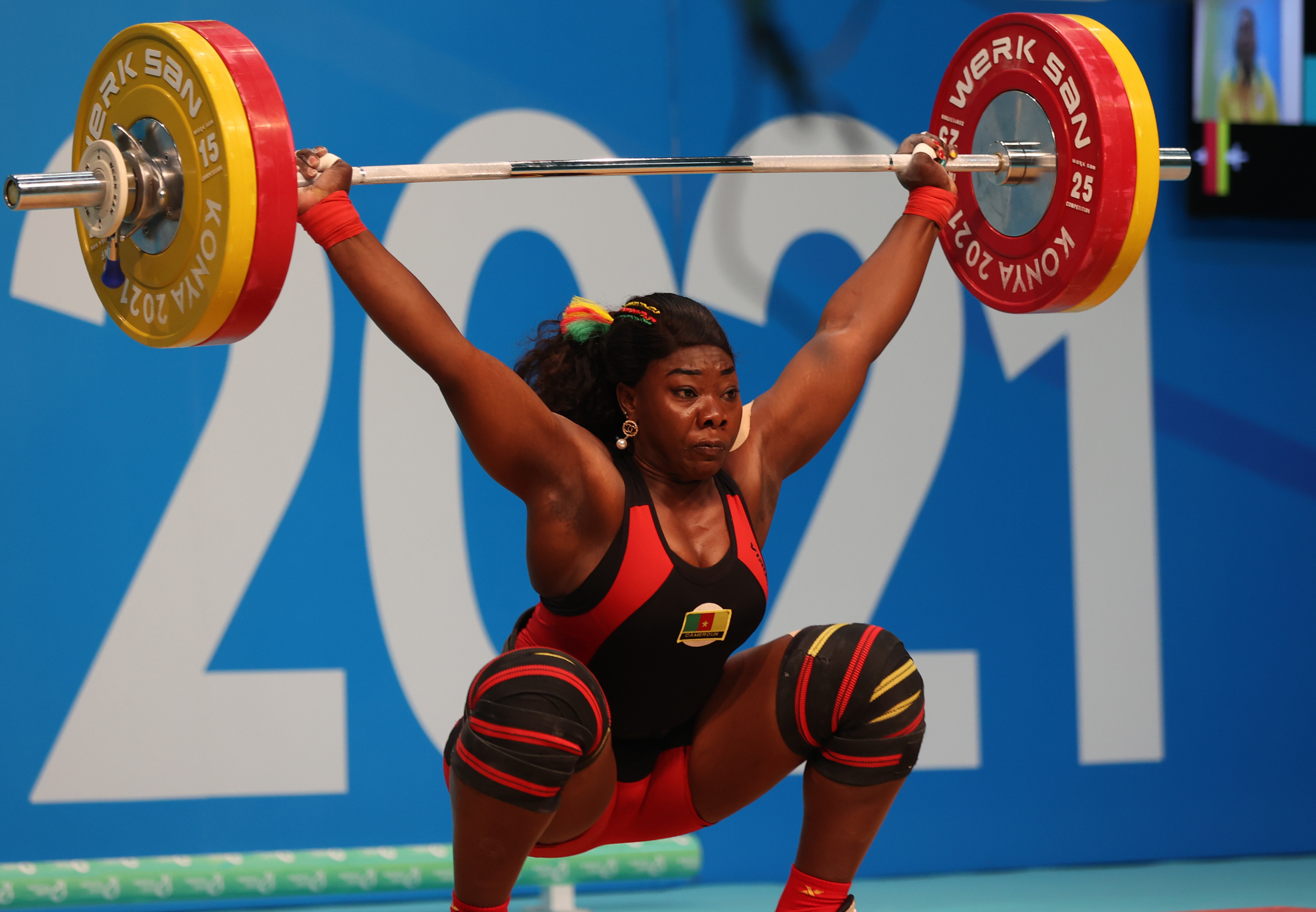

Personal information
- Full name: Clementine Meukeugni Noumbissi
- Born: 1 October 1990 (age 35) Yaoundé, Cameroon
- Height: 178 cm (5 ft 10 in)
- Weight: 86 kg (190 lb)

Sport
- Sport: Weightlifting
Medal record
Women's weightlifting
Representing Cameroon
Commonwealth Games
Bronze medal – third place	2018 Gold Coast	90 kg
Islamic Solidarity Games
Silver medal – second place	2021 Konya	87 kg
African Games
Silver medal – second place	2019 Rabat	87 kg
Commonwealth Championships
Silver medal – second place	2021 Tashkent	87 kg
African Championships
Gold medal – first place	2021 Nairobi	87 kg
Silver medal – second place	2019 Cairo	87 kg
Islamic Solidarity Games
Silver medal – second place	2017 Baku	90 kg

Clementine Meukeugni Noumbissi (born 1 October 1990) is a Cameroonian weightlifter. She competed in the women's 90 kg event at the 2018 Commonwealth Games, winning the bronze medal. She competed in the women's 87 kg event at the 2020 Summer Olympics held in Tokyo, Japan.

She competed in the women's 87 kg event at the 2022 Commonwealth Games held in Birmingham, England.
