= Eileen Cikamatana =

Australian weightlifter (born 1999)

Personal information
- Nationality: Fijian
- Born: Eileen Floanna Maria Cikamatana; 18 September 1999 (age 27) Levuka, Fiji

Sport
- Country: Australia
- Sport: Weightlifting
- Club: Oceania Weightlifting Institute Gym
- Coached by: Paul Coffa
Medal record
Women's weightlifting
Representing Australia
World Championships
Silver medal – second place	2022 Bogotá	87 kg
Silver medal – second place	2024 Manama	87 kg
Bronze medal – third place	2023 Riyadh	81 kg
Bronze medal – third place	2025 Førde	86 kg
Commonwealth Games
Gold medal – first place	2022 Birmingham	87 kg
Oceania Championships
Gold medal – first place	2021	87 kg
Gold medal – first place	2025 Meyuns	86 kg
Gold medal – first place	2026 Apia	86 kg
Representing Fiji
Commonwealth Games
Gold medal – first place	2018 Gold Coast	90 kg
Commonwealth Championships
Gold medal – first place	2017 Gold Coast	90 kg
Silver medal – second place	2016 Penang	69 kg
Oceania Championships
Gold medal – first place	2017 Gold Coast	90 kg
Silver medal – second place	2016 Suva	69 kg
Asian Indoor and Martial Arts Games
Gold medal – first place	2017 Ashgabat	90 kg
World Championships (Junior)
Silver medal – second place	2017 Tokyo	90 kg
World Championships (Youth)
Bronze medal – third place	2016 Penang	69 kg

Eileen Floanna Maria Cikamatana (born 18 September 1999) is an Australian weightlifter who previously represented Fiji.

== Career ==
She competed in the women's 90 kg event at the 2018 Commonwealth Games, winning the gold medal. Cikamatana was named 2017 Fiji's sportswoman of the year, but was controversially omitted from consideration for the 2018 Fiji sports awards following her gold medal winning performance at the 2018 Commonwealth Games.

She also won the gold medal in the women's 87 kg event at the 2022 Commonwealth Games held in Birmingham, England, which made her the first woman to win a gold medal at the Commonwealth Games for two different countries.

In the wake of a dispute between Weightlifting Fiji and breakaway group Fiji Weightlifters Association, she committed to representing Australia under coach Paul Coffa in February 2019 and was able to return to international competition later that year. However, the circumstances over her transfer of allegiance made Cikamatana ineligible to qualify for the delayed 2020 Summer Olympics in Tokyo.

In 2024, she competed in the women's 81 kg event at the Summer Olympics held in Paris, France. She lifted 262 kg in total and finished fourth missing out by 5 kg on a bronze medal.

== Major results ==
Year	Venue	Weight	Snatch (kg)				Clean & Jerk (kg)				Total	Rank
Year	Venue	Weight	1	2	3	Rank	1	2	3	Rank	Total	Rank
Representing Australia
Olympic Games
2024	Paris, France	81 kg	113	117	~~120~~	—N/a	145	~~149~~	~~149~~	—N/a	262	4
World Weightlifting Championships
2022	Bogotá, Colombia	87 kg	109	~~111~~	~~111~~	3rd place, bronze medalist(s)	140	~~148~~	~~148~~	3rd place, bronze medalist(s)	249	2nd place, silver medalist(s)
2023	Riyadh, Saudi Arabia	81 kg	~~110~~	110	~~115~~	5	143	146	~~150~~	3rd place, bronze medalist(s)	256	3rd place, bronze medalist(s)
2024	Manama, Bahrain	87 kg	113	~~117~~	~~117~~	3rd place, bronze medalist(s)	~~144~~	144	~~149~~	2nd place, silver medalist(s)	257	2nd place, silver medalist(s)
2025	Førde, Norway	86 kg	~~112~~	112	~~115~~	4	140	~~146~~	~~146~~	3rd place, bronze medalist(s)	252	3rd place, bronze medalist(s)
IWF World Cup
2019	Tianjin, China	81 kg	~~110~~	110	~~119~~	1st place, gold medalist(s)	146	~~150~~	150 JWR	1st place, gold medalist(s)	260 JWR	1st place, gold medalist(s)
2020	Rome, Italy	81 kg	110	115	~~120~~	1st place, gold medalist(s)	140	~~150~~	~~159~~	1st place, gold medalist(s)	255	1st place, gold medalist(s)
2024	Phuket, Thailand	81 kg	110	~~114~~	114	4	145	149	~~153~~	1st place, gold medalist(s)	263	3rd place, bronze medalist(s)
Commonwealth Games
2022	Birmingham, United Kingdom	87 kg	105	110; GR	~~113~~	1st place, gold medalist(s)	129	137	145; GR	1st place, gold medalist(s)	255; GR	1st place, gold medalist(s)
Oceania Championships
2021	Various, Oceania	87 kg	102	110	~~117~~	1st place, gold medalist(s)	130	140	~~150~~	1st place, gold medalist(s)	250	1st place, gold medalist(s)
2022	Saipan, Northern Mariana Islands	87 kg	104	110	~~113~~	1st place, gold medalist(s)	130	140	~~145~~	1st place, gold medalist(s)	250	1st place, gold medalist(s)
2023	Honiara, Solomon Islands	81 kg	110	115	~~119~~	1st place, gold medalist(s)	140	145	~~151~~	1st place, gold medalist(s)	260	1st place, gold medalist(s)
2024	Auckland, New Zealand	81 kg	~~113~~	~~113~~	~~113~~	—	—	—	—	—	—	—
IWF Grand Prix
2019	Lima, Peru	87 kg	110	~~115~~	115	1st place, gold medalist(s)	143	148	151 JWR	2nd place, silver medalist(s)	266	1st place, gold medalist(s)
Representing Fiji
Commonwealth Games
2018	Gold Coast, Australia	90 kg	103	~~107~~	~~107~~	2	130	~~140~~	~~144~~	1	233	1st place, gold medalist(s)
Oceania Championships
2015	Port Moresby, Papua New Guinea	63 kg	~~75~~	75	~~81~~	6	95	~~102~~	~~104~~	4	170	5
2016	Suva, Fiji	69 kg	~~90~~	90	93	1st place, gold medalist(s)	~~110~~	~~110~~	112	2nd place, silver medalist(s)	205	2nd place, silver medalist(s)
2017	Gold Coast, Australia	90 kg	~~102~~	102	~~111~~	1st place, gold medalist(s)	130	~~136~~	141	1st place, gold medalist(s)	243	1st place, gold medalist(s)
Junior World Championships
2017	Tokyo, Japan	90 kg	97	~~101~~	~~103~~	3rd place, bronze medalist(s)	124	129	132	2nd place, silver medalist(s)	229	2nd place, silver medalist(s)
Youth World Championships
2016	Penang, Malaysia	69 kg	~~93~~	93	~~96~~	4	116	117	122	1st place, gold medalist(s)	215	3rd place, bronze medalist(s)
