= Ruth Kasirye =

Norwegian weightlifter (born 1982)

Personal information
- Born: 1982-06-10
Medal record
Women's Weightlifting
Representing Norway
European Championships
Silver medal – second place	2007 Strasbourg	– 58 kg
Silver medal – second place	2009 Bucharest	– 63 kg

Ruth Kasirye (born June 10, 1982 in Mukono, Uganda) is a Norwegian weightlifter competing in the Women's 58 kg and 63 kg categories.

She came to Norway in 1998.

In the 58 kg category, she competed at the 2005, 2006, and 2007 World Weightlifting Championships, ranking 12th, 14th, and 8th, lifting a total of 185 kg, 191 kg, and 209 kg.

At the 2007 European Championships she won silver in the 58 kg category, with a total of 210 kg. At the 2008 European Championships she won the bronze medal in the snatch, and overall ranked fourth in the 63 kg category, with a total of 222 kg.

She represented Norway at the 2008 Summer Olympics, and was also the Norwegian flag bearer at the Opening Ceremony. In the Olympic tournament she ranked 7th in the 63 kg category, with a total of 224 kg.
