= Weightlifting at the 2018 Commonwealth Games – Women's 90 kg =

Weightlifting – Women's 90 kg at the 2018 Commonwealth Games
- Venue: Carrara Sports and Leisure Centre
- Dates: 9 April 2018
- Competitors: 8 from 8 nations
- Winning total weight: 233

Medalists
gold medal	Eileen Cikamatana	Fiji
silver medal	Kaity Fassina	Australia
bronze medal	Clementine Meukeugni Noumbissi	Cameroon

The Women's 90 kg weightlifting event at the 2018 Commonwealth Games took place at the Carrara Sports and Leisure Centre on 9 April 2018. The weightlifter from Fiji won the gold, with a combined lift of 233 kg.

== Records ==
Prior to this competition, the existing world, Commonwealth and Games records were as follows:

World record	Snatch	Viktoriya Shaymardanova (UKR)	130 kg	Athens, Greece	21 August 2004
World record	Clean & Jerk	Hripsime Khurshudyan (ARM)	160 kg	Antalya, Turkey	25 September 2010
World record	Total	Hripsime Khurshudyan (ARM)	283 kg	Antalya, Turkey	25 September 2010
Commonwealth record	Snatch	Eileen Cikamatana (FIJ)	111 kg	Ashgabat, Turkmenistan	24 September 2017
Commonwealth record	Clean & Jerk	Eileen Cikamatana (FIJ)	143 kg	Port Vila, Vanuatu	7 December 2017
Commonwealth record	Total	Eileen Cikamatana (FIJ)	253 kg	Ashgabat, Turkmenistan	24 September 2017

== Schedule ==
All times are Australian Eastern Standard Time (UTC+10)

Date	Time	Round
Saturday, 9 April 2018	14:00	Final

== Results ==
Rank	Athlete	Body weight (kg)	Snatch (kg)				Clean & Jerk (kg)				Total
Rank	Athlete	Body weight (kg)	1	2	3	Result	1	2	3	Result	Total
1st place, gold medalist(s)	Eileen Cikamatana (FIJ)	83.46	103	~~107~~	~~107~~	103	130	~~140~~	~~144~~	130	233
2nd place, silver medalist(s)	Kaity Fassina (AUS)	89.48	99	103	104	104	120	124	128	128	232
3rd place, bronze medalist(s)	Clementine Meukeugni Noumbissi (CMR)	85.33	95	98	101	101	120	~~125~~	125	125	226
4	Siti Aisyah Md Rosli (MAS)	89.64	88	91	~~93~~	91	118	123	~~124~~	123	214
5	Tracey Lambrechs (NZL)	89.78	89	~~93~~	93	93	~~119~~	120	~~126~~	120	213
6	Tayla Howe (WAL)	78.33	~~88~~	88	92	92	110	~~115~~	115	115	207
7	Lorraine Harry (PNG)	88.92	85	89	~~92~~	89	110	~~115~~	115	115	204
8	Lalchhanhimi (IND)	75.77	85	~~89~~	~~89~~	85	105	109	~~113~~	109	194
