= Stian Grimseth =

Norwegian weightlifter

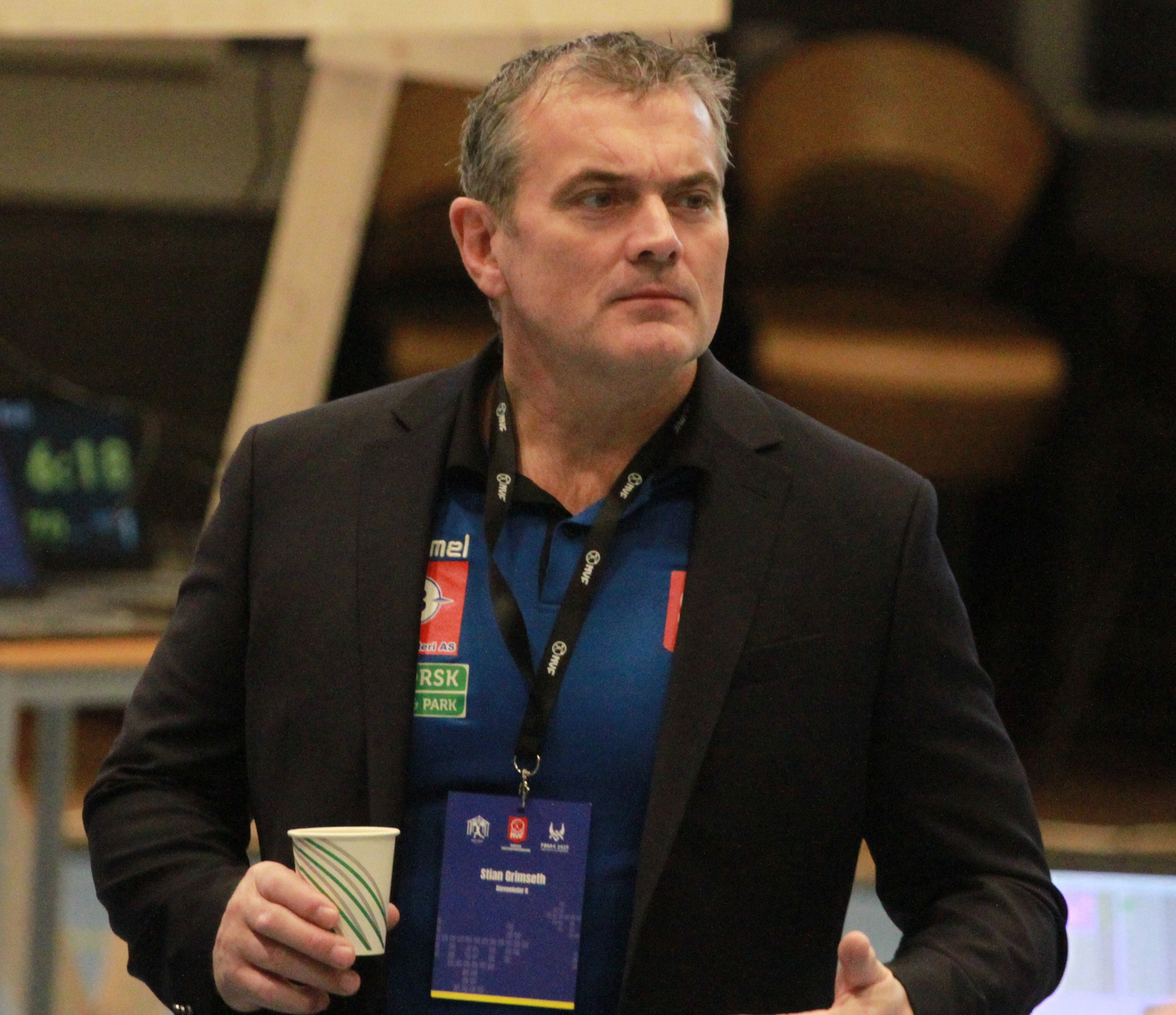
- Grimseth in 2023

Personal information
- Born: July 24, 1972 (age 53) Bergen, Norway
- Height: 1.87 m (6 ft 2 in)

Sport
- Country: Norway
- Sport: Weightlifting
- Weight class: +105 kg +108 kg
- Now coaching: Solfrid Koanda
Medal record
Men's weightlifting
Representing Norway
European Championships
Bronze medal – third place	1997 Rijeka	+108 kg

Stian Grimseth (born 24 July 1972) is a Norwegian former weightlifter from Naustdal Municipality. He won the gold medal in snatch at the European Championships in 1996 and 1997, and the bronze medal in total at the latter. Grimseth won twelve consecutive gold medals at the Norwegian Championship from 1993 to 2004, and two additional national gold medals in 2007 and 2008. He is a two-time Olympian and competed at the 1996 Atlanta Olympics in the +108 kg event and the 2004 Athens Olympics in the +105 kg event. Grimseth retired in 2008. He was elected President of the Norwegian Weightlifting Federation in 2019.

In September 2000, Grimseth tested positive for the banned substance nandrolone and missed the 2000 Sydney Olympics. He later served a six-month national and 15 month international suspension. Analyses showed that the substance came from the supplement Ribose and Grimseth filed a lawsuit against the manufacturer Universal Nutrition in 2002 that was settled four years later.

Grimseth is an active member of the Conservative Party.
