= Madias Ngake =

Cameroonian and English weightlifter (born 1992)

Personal information
- Full name: Madias Dodo Nzesso Ngake
- Born: 20 April 1992 (age 34) Douala, Cameroon
- Height: 164 cm (5 ft 5 in)

Sport
- Country: Cameroon; Great Britain
- Sport: Weightlifting
Medal record
Women's weightlifting
Representing Cameroon
Olympic Games
Bronze medal – third place	2012 London	75 kg
Representing Great Britain
European Championships
Bronze medal – third place	2026 Batumi	86 kg
Representing England
Commonwealth Games
Silver medal – second place	2026 Glasgow	86 kg

Madias Dodo Nzesso Ngake (born 20 April 1992 in Douala, Cameroon) is a British-Cameroonian weightlifter and Olympic bronze medallist.

== Biography ==
Madias Dodo Nzesso Ngake was born in Douala, Cameroon, on 20 April 1992.

She placed fourth in weightlifting at the 2010 Commonwealth Games in Delhi, India.

She competed at the 2012 Summer Olympics in the -75 kg event. She originally placed sixth, however the three medalists were subsequently disqualified and stripped of their medal, and Ngake was awarded the bronze medal. In 2024 at the age of 32 she transferred allegiance to Great Britain and England, where she had been living for some years. In December of that year she finished eighth in the 87kg class at the 2024 World Weightlifting Championships, having finished second in the snatch portion of the event and tenth in the clean and jerk portion.

At the 2026 European Weightlifting Championships, Ngake won the bronze medal in the Women's 86 kg event, having again finished second in the snatch portion, and fifth in the clean and jerk. She followed this up with a silver medal for Team England in the same event at the Glasgow 2026 Commonwealth Games.

== Personal life ==
Ngake is lesbian. During the 2012 Summer Olympics, she was outed. She decided to remain in the UK following the games, as Cameroon outlaws homosexuality, during which time she experienced homelessness and worked as an office cleaner.
