= Kongepokal =

Norwegian sports award

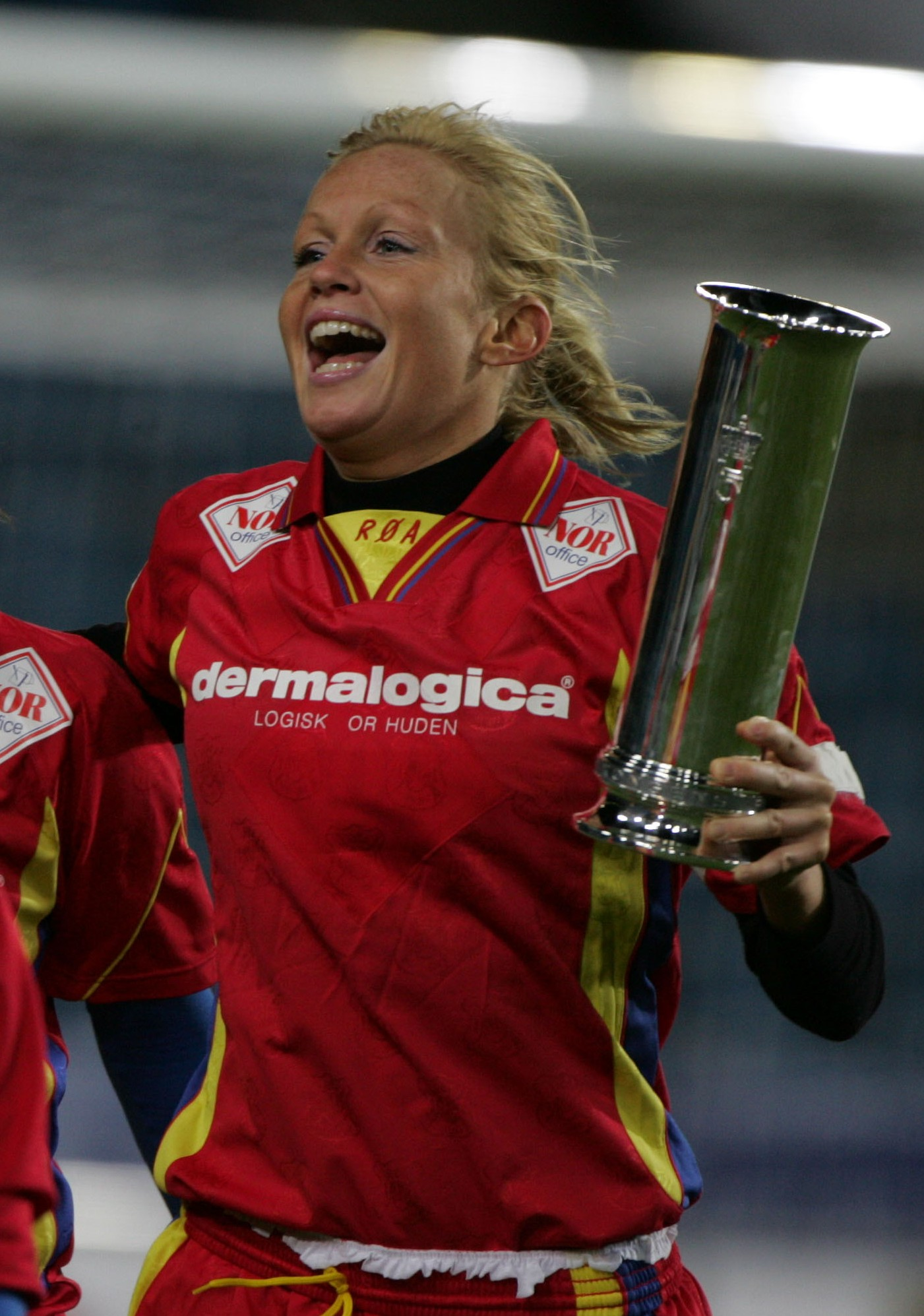
Kristine Edner, with the trophy in 2004.

Kongepokalen (officially: Hans Majestet Kongens Pokal) is a Norwegian trophy awarded during Norwegian championships in a number of sports. In addition to Norwegian championships, it is also awarded in the World Cup-race in Nordic combined in Holmenkollen. The first known King's Cup awarded to a sport within the Norwegian Olympic and Paralympic Committee and Confederation of Sports (NIF) was set up by King Oscar II for Husebyrennet in 1879. The trophies are paid for jointly by the Royal Court and NIF.

King's trophies are awarded to most sports organized in NIF. The trophy is set up for the woman and man who deliver the supposed best result during a senior Norwegian Championship. In some sports the King's Cup is awarded to the best result/athlete regardless of exercise (e.g. athletics and swimming), while in other sports the King's Cup is set up in a single exercise. In order for the King's Cup to be awarded, there must be at least 15 athletes competing for it. In team sports, at least 8 teams must participate in the national championship for the King's Cup to be awarded.

Most federations within the Norwegian Sports Confederation are awarded two royal trophies each year. Some federations that administer several different sports are awarded several royal trophies, such as The Norwegian Martial Arts Association, the Norwegian Climbing Association and the Norwegian Archery Association. The Norwegian Ski Federation awards at least five royal trophies each year to Norwegian champions in alpine, cross-country, ski jumping, Nordic combined, freestyle and telemarking, in addition to the winner of the world cup race in Nordic combined in Holmenkollen.

King's trophies are also awarded in activities that are not organized within NIF, including the Norwegian Trotting Association and the National Rifle Association of Norway, where the "shooting king" receives the trophy. King's trophies are also awarded outside of traditional sports, such as chess, folk music, brass bands and tracking dogs.

== History ==
During Husebyrennet in 1879, the King set up a royal mug for his best man on skis. This was won by Jon Hauge. Furthermore, six smaller mugs were also set up, which were distributed to other classes. King Oscar II himself was present. Until 1905, he set up a total of sixty royal trophies, mainly in skiing. In 1901, the King's Cup in speed skating was awarded, and in 1902, athletics and association football received their first King's Cups.

In tennis, royal trophies were awarded to both men and women from 1910. This was the first time a royal trophy was awarded to a woman. Later, royal trophies were awarded to women in figure skating from 1915, in swimming from 1916, and in handball from 1939. Since 1979, most federations have awarded two royal trophies each year, to the best man and best woman in the Norwegian championships, respectively. In 1979, for the first time, royal trophies were awarded to both genders in badminton, basketball, table tennis, bowling, archery, fencing, football, golf, racewalking, dog sledding, judo, rowing and cycling.

The oldest registered royal trophy was made by goldsmith J. Tostrup in 1878, and is said to have been given to a trotting convention in Christiania.

From 1906 King Haakon VII set up royal trophies, from 1957 King Olav V and from 1991 King Harald V.

Other countries' kings also set up royal trophies for sporting achievements, including Spain (Copa del Rey in football since 1902), and Japan (Emperor's Cup, in football since 1921 and in sumo wrestling since 1925.)

== Design and manufacturers ==
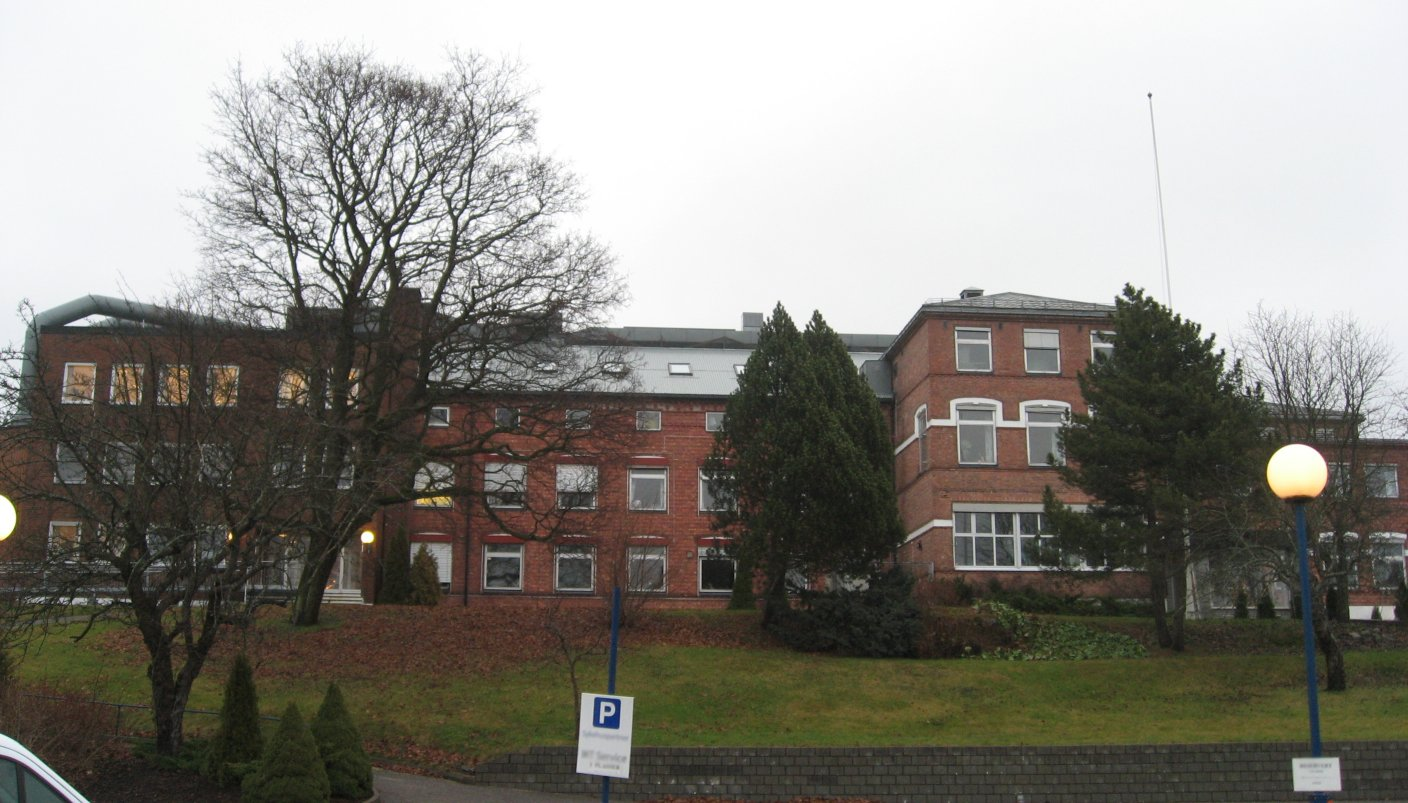
Th. Marthinsens sølvvarefabrikk in Tønsberg

The King's Cup's appearance has varied over the years, and several different goldsmiths have been used as manufacturer, including Tostrup, N.M. Thune and Hammer in Bergen. Around 1920, A. Frisch took over most of the production of the King's Cups and later "Th. Marthinsens Sølvvarefabrikk".

During King Haakon VII's reign, a number of different royal trophies were made, but the royal trophy was redesigned after the change of throne in 1957, when King Olav V switched to the royal trophy we know today. It was "Th. Marthinsen Sølvvarefabrikk" in Tønsberg who made it, and the trophy had a more sober design than those awarded under King Haakon VII. King Harald V retained the same design and manufacturer as King Olav after the change of throne in 1991.

The trophy is 21 cm high and weighs about 330 grams. It is almost cylindrical with a widespread at the top of the mouth and a slightly wider but narrow foot. Near the foot goes a ribbon, bounded by two rings. On the tape it is written "H.M. The King's Prize". The ribbon and rings are soldered to the trophy. On the shiny cylinder is the king's monogram with the crown soldered on.

The King's Cup, which is awarded to the winning team in the cup finals of the National Championships in men's and women's football, is similar to the other trophies. The miniature trophies awarded to each of the players are a 16 cm high copy in which the royal monogram has been replaced with the Football Association's badge.
