= Taekwondo at the 2011 Pacific Games =

Taekwondo competition

- Location: Nouméa, New Caledonia
- Dates: 6–9 September 2011

Taekwondo at the 2011 Pacific Games in Nouméa, New Caledonia was held on September 6–9, 2011.

== Medal summary ==
=== Medal table ===
Rank	Nation	Gold	Silver	Bronze	Total
1	French Polynesia (TAH)	12	4	0	16
2	New Caledonia	3	8	3	14
3	Papua New Guinea	1	1	8	10
4	Samoa	1	1	1	3
5	Fiji	0	1	1	2
6	Tonga	0	1	0	1
6	Vanuatu	0	1	0	1
8	Solomon Islands	0	0	6	6
9	Guam	0	0	3	3
10	Wallis and Futuna	0	0	2	2
Totals (10 entries)		17	17	24	58

=== Men ===
Event	Gold	Silver	Bronze
–54kg	Emerick Dubois; New Caledonia	François Mu; Tahiti	Albert Bexton Karulaka; Papua New Guinea
–54kg	Emerick Dubois; New Caledonia	François Mu; Tahiti	Joseph Ho; Guam
–58kg	Tutetoa Tchong; Tahiti	Siaosi Veatupu; Tonga	Terrence Lapitan; Guam
–58kg	Tutetoa Tchong; Tahiti	Siaosi Veatupu; Tonga	Sameer Ali; Fiji
–63kg	Paraita Brothers; Tahiti	Vincent Roubio; New Caledonia	Derick Afu; Solomon Islands
–63kg	Paraita Brothers; Tahiti	Vincent Roubio; New Caledonia	Anton Aitsi; Papua New Guinea
–68kg	Raihau Chin; Tahiti	Axel Raymond; New Caledonia	Wilson Saii; Solomon Islands
–68kg	Raihau Chin; Tahiti	Axel Raymond; New Caledonia	Hemmison Essau; Papua New Guinea
–74kg	Kuaoleni Samuel Mercier; Tahiti	Stephane Ouazana; New Caledonia	Jurgen Shan Vegi; Wallis and Futuna
–74kg	Kuaoleni Samuel Mercier; Tahiti	Stephane Ouazana; New Caledonia	Samson Kwalea; Solomon Islands
–80kg	Reynald Chan; Tahiti	Jérémy Wiard; New Caledonia	Chatterton Roberts; Papua New Guinea
–80kg	Reynald Chan; Tahiti	Jérémy Wiard; New Caledonia	Paino Talikilagi Mulikihaamea; Wallis and Futuna
–87kg	Kaino Thomsen; Samoa	Pranit Kumar; Fiji	Clyde Sade Rika; Solomon Islands
–87kg	Kaino Thomsen; Samoa	Pranit Kumar; Fiji	John Trouillet; New Caledonia
+87kg	Hamanatua Mu; Tahiti	Holmes Kalfau Kalotrip; Vanuatu	Karel Orthosie; New Caledonia
Team	Tahiti (TAH)	New Caledonia (NCL)	Solomon Islands (SOL)
Team	Tahiti (TAH)	New Caledonia (NCL)	Papua New Guinea (PNG)

=== Women ===
Event	Gold	Silver	Bronze
–49kg	Chaveta Sangue; Tahiti	Theresa Tona; Papua New Guinea	Hang Pham; Guam
–49kg	Chaveta Sangue; Tahiti	Theresa Tona; Papua New Guinea	Jenny Dabin; New Caledonia
–53kg	Lindsay Gavin; New Caledonia	Audrey Vognin; Tahiti	Bonnie Nohokau; Papua New Guinea
–57kg	Yasmina Feuti; Tahiti	Lenka Folcher; New Caledonia	Mavete Mase; Solomon Islands
–57kg	Yasmina Feuti; Tahiti	Lenka Folcher; New Caledonia	Trinette Soatsin; Papua New Guinea
–63kg	Raihau Tauotaha; Tahiti	Meryl Monawa; New Caledonia	Lealofisaolefaleomalietoa Mavaeao; Samoa
–63kg	Raihau Tauotaha; Tahiti	Meryl Monawa; New Caledonia	Noelyne Hetana; Papua New Guinea
–67kg	Averii Gaiten; Tahiti	Doriane Gohe; New Caledonia	Taliai Mika; Samoa
–67kg	Averii Gaiten; Tahiti	Doriane Gohe; New Caledonia	Rittah Elisabeth Toliman; Papua New Guinea
–73kg	Alana Peraldi; New Caledonia	Amaiterai Tetuanui; Tahiti	Not awarded
+73kg	Anne-Caroline Graffe; Tahiti	Talitiga Crawley; Samoa	Not awarded
Team	Papua New Guinea (PNG)	Tahiti (TAH)	Not awarded
