= Athletics at the 2011 Pacific Games =

Athletics at the XIV Pacific Games
- Dates: September 3–11
- Host city: Nouméa, New Caledonia /
- Venue: Stade Numa-Daly Magenta
- Level: Senior

Athletics at the 2011 Pacific Games in Nouméa, New Caledonia was held on September 3–10, 2011.

For the first time at the Pacific Games, four parasport events were also included: Men's Shot Put – seated throw, Women's Shot Put – seated throw, Men's Javelin – ambulatory, and Men's 100m – ambulatory.

== Medal table ==
Rank	Nation	Gold	Silver	Bronze	Total
1	New Caledonia	18	13	21	52
2	Papua New Guinea	15	9	9	33
3	French Polynesia (TAH)	8	7	5	20
4	Fiji	4	10	7	21
5	Wallis and Futuna	1	3	2	6
6	Samoa	1	3	1	5
7	Tonga	1	1	2	4
8	Vanuatu	0	1	1	2
9	Guam	0	1	0	1
Totals (9 entries)		48	48	48	144

== Medal summary ==
=== Men ===
Event	Gold		Silver		Bronze	
100m (wind: +0.4 m/s)	Banuve Tabakaucoro; Fiji	10.52	Paul Zongo; New Caledonia	10.80	Ruwan Gunasinghe; Papua New Guinea	10.88
200m (wind: -1.1 m/s)	Banuve Tabakaucoro; Fiji	21.18 GR	Nelson Stone; Papua New Guinea	21.59	Sikeli Rokowaqa; Fiji	22.09
400m	Nelson Stone; Papua New Guinea	47.48	Ratutira Narara; Fiji	48.19	John Rivan; Papua New Guinea	48.35
800m	Adrien Kela; New Caledonia	1:54.12	Arnold Sorina; Vanuatu	1:55.14	Kevin Kapmatana; Papua New Guinea	1:56.22
1500m	Adrien Kela; New Caledonia	4:01.54	Derek Mandell; Guam	4:02.95	Cédric Oblet; New Caledonia	4:03.19
5000m	Nordine Benfodda; New Caledonia	15:22.46	Frédéric Burquier; Tahiti	15:36.17	Audric Lucini; New Caledonia	15:48.58
10000m	Nordine Benfodda; New Caledonia	32:08.28	Georges Richmond; Tahiti	32:25.51	Thomas Prono; New Caledonia	32:25.52
Marathon	Georges Richmond; Tahiti	2:31:09	Frédéric Burquier; Tahiti	2:33:37	Patrick Vernay; New Caledonia	2:40:39
110m hurdles (wind: -0.7 m/s)	Mowen Boino; Papua New Guinea	14.95	Christopher Leroy; New Caledonia	15.64	Xavier Fenuafanote; New Caledonia	15.90
400m hurdles	Mowen Boino; Papua New Guinea	50.96 GR	Simon Thieury; Tahiti	51.87	Roy Ravana; Fiji	52.95
3000m steeplechase	Théo Houdret; New Caledonia	9:49.30	Sapolai Yao; Papua New Guinea	9.53.33	Skene Kiage; Papua New Guinea	9:55.90
4 × 100 m relay	Fiji; Eugene Vollmer; Roy Ravana; Beniamino Maravu; Banuve Tabakaucoro	41.25	Papua New Guinea; Kupun Wisil; Nelson Stone; Regina Worealevi; Ruwan Gunasinghe	41.47	New Caledonia; Ruwan Alexandrine; Frédéric Erin; Kainric Ozoux; Paul Zongo	41.52
4 × 400 m relay	Papua New Guinea; John Rivan; Mowen Boino; Wala Gime; Nelson Stone	3:12.34	Fiji; Isikeli Rokowaqa; Beniamino Maravu; Niko Verekauta; Ratutira Narara	3:12.75	Vanuatu; Arnold Sorina; David Benjimen; Jimmy Nocklam; Moses Kamut	3:13.94
High jump	Ogun Robert; New Caledonia	2.06	Isikeli Waqa; Fiji	2.01	David Jessem; Papua New Guinea	1.97
Pole vault	Éric Reuillard; New Caledonia	5.00 GR	Laurent Honoré; New Caledonia	4.20	Jean-Bernard Harper; New Caledonia	4.00
Long jump	Frédéric Erin; New Caledonia	8.12 (+1.9 m/s) GR	Raihau Maiau; Tahiti	7.54 (+0.5 m/s)	Eugene Vollmer; Fiji	7.25 (+0.5 m/s)
Triple jump	Frédéric Erin; New Caledonia	16.10 GR	Eugene Vollmer; Fiji	15.67	Kainric Ozoux; New Caledonia	14.54
Shot put	Tumatai Dauphin; Tahiti	18.93 GR	Emanuele Fuamatu; Samoa	18.11	Shaka Sola; Samoa	16.17
Discus throw	Bertrand Vili; New Caledonia	54.12	Aukusitino Hoatau; Wallis and Futuna	47.07	Frédéric Kiteau; New Caledonia	46.26
Hammer throw	Tomasi Toto; New Caledonia	57.18 m	Erwan Cassier; New Caledonia	55.11 m	Eutesio Toto; New Caledonia	54.20 m
Javelin throw	Leslie Copeland; Fiji	78.41	Vahaafenua Tipotio; Wallis and Futuna	65.92	Sosefo Panuve; Wallis and Futuna	64.11
Decathlon	Éric Reuillard; New Caledonia	6292	Lilian Garçon; New Caledonia	5443	Lars Fa'apoi; Tonga	5334
100 m Ambulant	Francis Kompaon; Papua New Guinea	11.32 (F44)	Elias Larry; Papua New Guinea	12.88 (T37)	Ranjesh Prakash; Fiji	12.67 (T13)
Javelin Ambulant	Tony Falelavaki; Wallis and Futuna	55.46 (F44)	Thierry Washetine; New Caledonia	41.12 (F20)	Yves Mavaetau; Wallis and Futuna	41.40 (F44)
Shot Put Seated	Thierry Cibone; New Caledonia	10.90 (F35)	Jean-Pierre Talatini; New Caledonia	10.12 (F34)	Pasilione Tafilagi; New Caledonia	11.13 (F58)

=== Women ===
Event	Gold		Silver		Bronze	
100m (wind: +0.3 m/s)	Toea Wisil; Papua New Guinea	11.96	Paulini Korowaqa; Fiji	12.31	Sisilia Seavula; Fiji	12.36
200m (wind: -1.1 m/s)	Toea Wisil; Papua New Guinea	24.61	Paulini Korowaqa; Fiji	25.37	Venessa Waro; Papua New Guinea	25.38
400m	Toea Wisil; Papua New Guinea	54.94	Miriama Senokonoko; Fiji	55.41	Salome Dell; Papua New Guinea	55.97
800m	Salome Dell; Papua New Guinea	2:13.21	Donna Koniel; Papua New Guinea	2:16.80	Cecilia Kumalalamene; Papua New Guinea	2:20.00
1500m	Salome Dell; Papua New Guinea	4:52.76	Heiata Brinkfield; Tahiti	4:54.07	Mereseini Naidau; Fiji	4:54.07
5000m	Anne Beaufils; New Caledonia	18:39.98	Mereseini Naidau; Fiji	19:02.15	Sophie Gardon; Tahiti	19:07.98
10000m	Anne Beaufils; New Caledonia	39:22.08	Isabelle Oblet; New Caledonia	39:47.85	Sophie Gardon; Tahiti	40:14.99
Marathon	Sophie Gardon; Tahiti	3:01:11	Erika Ellis; New Caledonia	3:13:32	Odile Huon; New Caledonia	3:29:50
100m hurdles (wind: -1.3 m/s)	Sharon Kwarula; Papua New Guinea	14.70	Lucie Turpin; New Caledonia	14.71	Phoebe Wejieme; New Caledonia	15.17
400m hurdles	Betty Burua; Papua New Guinea	1:07.32	Sharon Kwarula; Papua New Guinea	1:07.48	Donna Koniel; Papua New Guinea	1:10.62
3000m steeplechase	Heiata Brinkfield; Tahiti	11:07.55 GR	Astrid Montuclard; Tahiti	11:37.39	Isabelle Oblet; New Caledonia	11:52.96
4 × 100 m relay	Papua New Guinea; Helen Philemon; Toea Wisil; Sharon Kwarula; Venessa Waro	46.30	Fiji; Litiana Miller; Paulini Korowaqa; Miria Senokonoko; Sisilia Seavula	46.60	New Caledonia; Henricka Thomo; Phoebe Wejieme; Kamen Zongo; Franceska Sauvageot	48.91
4 × 400 m relay	Papua New Guinea; Salome Dell; Donna Koniel; Sharon Kwarula; Toea Wisil	3:45.32	Fiji; Paulini Korowaqa; Danielle Alakija; Sulian Gusuivalu; Miria Senokonoko	3:51.69	New Caledonia; Mondy Laigle; Phoebe Wejieme; Imufa Chaimoinri; Peggy Paulmin	4:11.02
High jump	Ternai Kali Faremiro; Tahiti	1.63 m	Nellie Leslie; Papua New Guinea	1.61 m	Véronique Boyer; Tahiti	1.57 m
Pole vault	Dolores Ablavi Dogba; Tahiti	2.60 m	Mondy Laigle; New Caledonia	2.55 m	Teumere Lucie Tepea; Tahiti	2.50 m
Long jump	Ternai Kali Faremiro; Tahiti	5.66 m (+0.0 m/s)	Helen Philemon; Papua New Guinea	5.46 m (+0.0 m/s)	Lucie Turpin; New Caledonia	5.42 m (+1.0 m/s)
Triple jump	Betty Burua; Papua New Guinea	11.83 m w (+2.2 m/s)	Manuella Gavin; New Caledonia	11.77 m w (+2.2 m/s)	Véronique Boyer; Tahiti	11.56 m (+1.9 m/s)
Shot put	Ana Po'uhila; Tonga	15.72 m	Margaret Satupai; Samoa	15.12 m	Aimée Mailetoga; New Caledonia	13.47 m
Discus throw	Margaret Satupai; Samoa	52.05 m	Ana Po'uhila; Tonga	48.22 m	Bina Ramesh; New Caledonia	45.48 m
Hammer throw	Elise Takosi; New Caledonia	50.13 m	Margaret Satupai; Samoa	49.71 m NR	'Ana Po'uhila; Tonga	47.27 m
Javelin throw	Linda Selui; New Caledonia	57.32 m GR	Romina Ugatai; Wallis and Futuna	52.07 m	Bina Ramesh; New Caledonia	48.19 m
Heptathlon	Terani Kali Faremiro; Tahiti	4667	Lucie Turpin; New Caledonia	4437	Soko Salaniqiqi; Fiji	4162
Shot Put Seated	Rose Vandegou; New Caledonia	9.90 (F41)	Rose Welepa; Papua New Guinea	9.60 (F41)	Evelyne Tuitavake; New Caledonia	9.00 (F58)

== See also ==
- Athletics at the Pacific Games
