= Triathlon at the 2011 Pacific Games – Men's sprint =

The Men's triathlon at the 2011 Pacific Games was held as part of the 2011 Pacific Games in Noumea, New Caledonia. The event brought together athletes from across the Pacific region to compete in a race combining swimming, cycling, and running. Patrick Vernay of New Caledonia claimed the gold medal.

Rank	Name	Nationality	Time	Gap	Swim	Cycle	Run
1	Patrick Vernay	New Caledonia	56:11				
2	Audric Lucini	New Caledonia	59:16				
3	Romain Lambert	French Polynesia	1:00:28				
4	Alexandre Delattre	French Polynesia	1:01:41				
5	Benjamin Zorgnotti	French Polynesia	1:01:42				
6	Thomas Testet	New Caledonia	1:02:25				
7	Peter Lombard II	Guam	1:05:09				
8	Mark Walters	Guam	1:10:13				
9	Stanley Ofasisili	Solomon Islands	1:11:21				
10	Joseph Dela Cruz	Guam	1:12:59				
11	Mairi Feeger	Papua New Guinea	1:14:04				
12	Gerhard Heinrich	Tonga	1:14:06				
13	Leban Lokata	Solomon Islands	1:14:09				
14	Akmal Khan	Samoa	1:14:56				
15	Alphones Waletitike	Solomon Islands	1:17:34				
16	Polihau Popeliau	Papua New Guinea	1:19:40				
17	Leka Kila	Papua New Guinea	1:20:25				
