= Karate at the 2011 Pacific Games =

Karate competition

- Location: Nouméa, New Caledonia
- Dates: 31 August–9 September 2011

Karate at the 2011 Pacific Games in Nouméa, New Caledonia was held on August 31–September 2, 2011.

== Medal summary ==
=== Medal table ===
Rank	Nation	Gold	Silver	Bronze	Total
1	New Caledonia	9	6	0	15
2	Fiji	6	5	1	12
3	Papua New Guinea	1	1	1	3
4	(French Polynesia) Tahiti	0	4	3	7
5	Vanuatu	0	1	1	2
6	Solomon Islands	0	0	4	4
Totals (6 entries)		16	17	10	43

=== Men ===
Event	Gold	Silver	Bronze
–60kg	Jean-Emmanuel Faure; New Caledonia	Stephen Tarip Manaruru; Vanuatu	Christopher Ariatewa; Solomon Islands
–67kg	Joji Veremalua; Fiji	Kévin Tuiseka; New Caledonia	Mauahiti Teriitehau; Tahiti
–75kg	Kévyn Pognon; New Caledonia	David Qiolevu; Fiji	Arnold Peato Lasalo; Vanuatu
–84kg	Pita Lenoa; Fiji	Mathieu Annonier; New Caledonia	Antoine Samoyeau; Tahiti
+84kg	Frédéric Roumagne; New Caledonia	Reiarii Delord; Tahiti	Ron Maefasia Uate'e; Solomon Islands
Individual Kata	Minh Dack; New Caledonia	Anthony Yam; Fiji	Taearii Flores; Tahiti
Team Kata	New Caledonia	Fiji	
Team Kumite	New Caledonia	(French Polynesia) Tahiti	Fiji
Open	J-Christophe Taumotekava; New Caledonia	Vehia Delano Putaa; Tahiti	Selwyn Kuru; Solomon Islands

=== Women ===
Event	Gold	Silver	Bronze
–50kg	Melissa Turia; Papua New Guinea	Béatrice Ouassette; New Caledonia	
–61kg	Adi Drodrolagi Kidia; Fiji	Jacklyn Barney; Papua New Guinea	
–68kg	Naomi Bakani; Fiji	Germaine Ngaiohni; New Caledonia	Janet Lydia Gwai; Solomon Islands
Individual Kata	Naomi Bakani; Fiji	Emilie Brizard; New Caledonia	
Team Kata	Fiji	New Caledonia	
Team Kumite	New Caledonia	Fiji	(French Polynesia) Tahiti
Open	Morane Vacher; New Caledonia	Adi Drodrolagi Kidia; Fiji	Jacklyn Barney; Papua New Guinea
