= Bodybuilding at the 2011 Pacific Games =

Bodybuilding at the 2011 Pacific Games in Nouméa, New Caledonia was held on August 29, 2011. The competition was marred by doping scandals, with Tahitain bodybuilder Steve Wong Foe convicted of importation and possession of performance-enhancing drugs prior to the games, and the post-competition disqualification of four gold medallists, two each from Tahiti and Tonga, due to positive drug tests.

== Medal summary ==
=== Medal table ===
| Rank | Nation | Gold | Silver | Bronze | Total |
|---|---|---|---|---|---|
| 1 | French Polynesia (TAH) | 3 | 0 | 2 | 5 |
| 2 | Samoa | 2 | 2 | 1 | 5 |
| 3 | New Caledonia | 2 | 1 | 0 | 3 |
| 4 | Guam | 1 | 2 | 0 | 3 |
| 5 | Papua New Guinea | 1 | 1 | 0 | 2 |
| 6 | Fiji | 0 | 1 | 0 | 1 |
| 6 | Tonga | 0 | 1 | 0 | 1 |
| 8 | Cook Islands | 0 | 0 | 1 | 1 |
| 8 | Solomon Islands | 0 | 0 | 1 | 1 |
| Totals (9 entries) | | 9 | 8 | 5 | 22 |

=== Men ===
| Event | Gold | Silver | Bronze |
|---|---|---|---|
| –65 kg ^{[a]} | Brando Quejado (GUM) | Iso Finch (PNG) | unknown |
| –70 kg | Anthony Bac (TAH) | Sakaio Puletuu (SAM) | John Paul (SOL) |
| –75 kg | Jack Viyufa (PNG) | Richard Rosete (GUM) | Stéphane Matke (TAH) |
| –80 kg ^{[b]} | Iusi "Tony" Ligaliga (SAM) | Philippe Carnicelli (NCL) | unknown |
| –85 kg ^{[c]} | Stanley Bruneau (TAH) | Filipo Laulusa (SAM) | Aaron Enoka (COK) |
| –90 kg ^{[d]} | Chris "Alex" Brown (SAM) | Sione Fatai (TGA) | unknown |
| –100 kg | Yip Tahuïro (TAH) | Voniriti Radua (FIJ) | Mao Sanele (SAM) |
| +100 kg | not contested | | |

Overall title

Jack Viyufa

Notes

- ^{Under 65 kg} The original gold medallist, Maurice Tchan of Tahiti, was disqualified after testing positive for stanozol and was banned from competition for two years by the Pacific Games Council. Brando Quejado, listed as "Inacay Brando" on some records, was awarded the gold medal. Iso Finch was awarded the silver medal.
- ^{Under 80 kg} The original gold medallist, Sitani "Stan" Tautalanoa of Tonga, was disqualified after testing positive for methylhexanamine (DMAA) and was banned from competition for two years by the Pacific Games Council. Iusi "Tony" Ligaliga and Philippe Carnicelli were awarded the gold and silver medals, respectively.
- ^{Under 85 kg} The original gold medallist, Mateo Vaihu of Tonga, was disqualified after testing positive for stanozolol, clenbuterol and hydrochlorothiazide. He was banned from competition for two years by the Pacific Games Council. Stanley Bruneau was awarded the gold medal, (although he was subsequently stripped of a silver medal at the 2015 Pacific Games, where he was disqualified for a positive drug test). Filipo Laulusa was awarded the silver medal for 2011, and Aaron Enoka of Cook Islands was awarded the bronze medal.
- ^{Under 90 kg} The original gold medallist, Emmanuel Buchin of Tahiti, was disqualified after testing positive for S1 exogenous and endogenous anabolic androgenic steroids. He was banned from competition for two years by the Pacific Games Council. Christopher "Alex" Brown and Sione Fatai were awarded the gold and silver medals, respectively.

=== Women ===
| Event | Gold | Silver | Bronze |
|---|---|---|---|
| –55 kg | Virginie Foucault (NCL) | Florencia Burke (GUM) | Anne-Marie Vongue (TAH) |
| +55 kg | Stéphanie Quach (NCL) | Not awarded | |

Overall title

Virginie Foucault
