= Archery at the 2011 Pacific Games =

- Venue: Stade Édouard-Pentecost at Anse Vata
- Location: Nouméa, New Caledonia
- Dates: 6–9 September 2019

Archery at the 2011 Pacific Games in Nouméa, New Caledonia was held on 6–9 September 2019.

== Medal summary ==
=== Medal table ===
* Host nation (New Caledonia (host))

Rank	Nation	Gold	Silver	Bronze	Total
1	New Caledonia* ^{a}	7	4	1	12
2	(French Polynesia) Tahiti ^{b}	3	5	5	13
3	Fiji	1	1	3	5
4	Samoa	1	1	1	3
Totals (4 entries)		12	11	10	33

Notes

^a Host nation New Caledonia won twelve archery medals including seven gold.

^b The Tahitian archers took home thirteen medals including three gold. Hauarii Winkelstroer won four medals, including two gold (one in individual competition, and one in team competition). Stéphane Fabisch also won an individual gold medal.

=== Men ===
Event	Gold		Silver		Bronze	
Full Recurve individual	Robert Elder (FIJ)	1228	Tearii Winkelstroeter (TAH)	1214	Clément Bonneterre (NCL)	1204
Match Recurve individual	Hauarii Winkelstroeter (TAH)		Gregoire Daniel (NCL)		Teiva Winkelstroeter (TAH)	
Match Recurve team 70m	New Caledonia; Clément Bonneterre; Anthony Clerte; Grégoire Daniel		French Polynesia; Hauarii Winkelstroeter; Tearii Winkelstroeter; Teiva Winkelstroeter		Fiji; Robert Elder; George Fong; Kavitesh Sharma	
Full Compound individual	Laurent Clerte (NCL)	1327	Kevin Chang Chen Chang (TAH)	1314	Heiraii Roo (TAH)	1299
Match Compound individual	Stéphane Fabisch (TAH)		Henry Shiu (NCL)		Kevin Chang Chen Chang (TAH)	
Match Compound team 50 m	New Caledonia; Laurent Clerte; Bruno Lau; Henri Shiu		Tahiti; Kevin Chang Chen Chang; Stéphane Fabisch; Heiraii Roo		N/A	

=== Women ===
Event	Gold		Silver		Bronze	
Full Recurve individual	Sylvana Plasanet (NCL)	1122	Temaruata Mousson (TAH)	1097	Daniele Gras (TAH)	1058
Match Recurve individual	Sylvana Plasanet (NCL)		Isabelle Dussol (NCL)		Temaruata Mousson (TAH)	
Match Recurve team 70m	Not contested					
Full Compound individual	Emmanuelle Guihard (NCL)	1243	Dameyanti Cook (FIJ)	1203	Zita Sefo-Martel (SAM)	1181
Match Compound individual	Zita Sefo-Martel (SAM)		Aloema Tuimalaeliifano (SAM)		Dameyanti Cook (FIJ)	
Match Compound team 50 m	Not contested					

=== Mixed ===
Event	Gold	Silver	Bronze
Match Recurve team 70 m	Tahiti; Hauarii Winkelstroer; Danièle Gras	New Caledonia; Anthony Clerte; Sylvana Plazanet	Fiji; Robert Elder; Devika Cook
Match Compound team 50 m	New Caledonia; Henri Shiu; Emmanuelle Guihard	Not awarded	Not awarded

== See also ==
- Archery at the Pacific Games

== Sources ==
- "Médaillés au mérite". Le Nouvelle Calédoniennes (in French). 2011.
- New Caledonia Medal Winners (PDF). Le Comité Territorial Olympique et Sportif de Nouvelle-Calédonie (Report) (in French). 2011. Archived (PDF) from the original on 25 June 2017.
- Team Samoa Medal Winners. Samoa Association of Sport and National Olympic Committee (Report). 2011. Archived from the original on 25 June 2017.
- Les 14éme Jeux du Pacifique: Bilan & Perspectives (Report) (in French). French Polynesian Directorate for Youth and Sport. 2011. Archived from the original on 27 June 2017.
