= Squash at the 2011 Pacific Games =

- Location: Nouméa, New Caledonia
- Dates: 29 August–9 September 2011

Squash at the 2011 Pacific Games in Nouméa, New Caledonia was held on August 29–September 9, 2011.

== Medal summary ==
=== Medal table ===
Rank	Nation	Gold	Silver	Bronze	Total
1	New Caledonia	7	3	2	12
2	Fiji	0	2	2	4
3	Samoa	0	1	2	3
4	Papua New Guinea	0	1	0	1
Totals (4 entries)		7	7	6	20

=== Men ===
Event	Gold	Silver	Bronze
Singles	Laurent Guepy; New Caledonia	Justin Ho; Fiji	Warren Yee; Fiji
Doubles	Laurent Guepy; Etienne Marziac; New Caledonia	Ivan Chewlit; Chad Rankin; Samoa	Fabian Dinh; Nicolas Massenet; New Caledonia
Team	New Caledonia	Fiji	Samoa

=== Women ===
Event	Gold	Silver	Bronze
Singles	Christine Deneufbourg; New Caledonia	Cynthia Tahuhuterani; New Caledonia	Vanessa Quach; New Caledonia
Doubles	Sylaine Durand; Vanessa Quach; New Caledonia	Christine Deneufbourg; Cynthia Tahuhuterani; New Caledonia	Fiona Ah Fook; Luciana Thompson; Samoa
Team	New Caledonia	Papua New Guinea	

=== Mixed ===
Event	Gold	Silver	Bronze
Doubles	Fabian Dinh; Sylvaine Durand; New Caledonia	Laurent Guepy; Vanessa Quach; New Caledonia	Warren Yee; Sharmila Devi; Fiji
