= Table tennis at the 2011 Pacific Games =

Taekwondo at the 2011 Pacific Games
- Location: Nouméa, New Caledonia
- Dates: 29 August–8 September 2011

Table tennis at the 2011 Pacific Games in Nouméa, New Caledonia was held on August 29–September 8, 2011.

== Medal summary ==
=== Medal table ===
Rank	Nation	Gold	Silver	Bronze	Total
1	French Polynesia (TAH)	4	3	0	7
2	New Caledonia	3	3	4	10
3	Vanuatu	0	1	1	2
4	Fiji	0	0	2	2
Totals (4 entries)		7	7	7	21

=== Results ===
Event	Gold	Silver	Bronze
Men's Singles	Alizé Belrose; Tahiti	Tinihau-O-Terai Klouman; Tahiti	Laurent Sens; New Caledonia
Men's Doubles	Laurent Sens; Stéphane Gilabert; New Caledonia	Océan Belrose; Tinihau-O-Terai Klouman; Tahiti	Richel Sen; Qi Wang; Fiji
Men's Team	Océan Belrose; Alizé Belrose; Kenji Hotan; Tinihau-O-Terai Klouman; Yoan Lossing; Tahiti	Olivier Bilon; Jeremy Dey; Stephane Gilabert; Jeremy Lao; Laurent Sens; New Caledonia	Richel Sen; Qi Wang; Sanesh Chand; Christopher Guttersberger; Fiji
Women's Singles	Alexandra Heraclide; New Caledonia	Ornella Boutelle; New Caledonia	Fleur Dumortier; New Caledonia
Women's Doubles	Alexandra Heraclide; Ornella Boutelle; New Caledonia	Tuarikiriau Thunot; Melveen Richmond; Tahiti	Fleur Dumortier; Léa Lai Van; New Caledonia
Women's Team	Melveen Richmond; Taurikirau Thunot; Tina Mii; Brenda Lui; Alize Gaumet; Tahiti	Ornella Bouteille; Fleur Dumortier; Alexandra Heraclide; Fabianna Faehau; Lea Lai Van; New Caledonia	Anolyn Lulu; Stephanie Qwea; Tracey Mawa; Pareina Matariki; Vanuatu
Mixed Doubles	Océan Belrose; Melveen Richmond; Tahiti	Anolyn Lulu; Yoshua Shing; Vanuatu	Ornella Boutelle; Laurent Sens; New Caledonia
