= Shooting at the 2011 Pacific Games =

Shooting competition

- Location: Nouméa, New Caledonia
- Dates: 30 August to 1 September 2011

Shooting at the 2011 Pacific Games was held on 30 August to 1 September 2011 in Nouméa, New Caledonia.

== Medal summary ==
=== Medal table ===
* Host nation ( New Caledonia)

Rank	Nation	Gold	Silver	Bronze	Total
1	Fiji	6	2	2	10
2	Tahiti	0	4	0	4
3	New Caledonia*	0	0	2	2
3	Samoa	0	0	2	2
Totals (4 entries)		6	6	6	18

=== Shotgun results ===
Event	Gold	Silver	Bronze
Single barrel individual	Glenn Kable; Fiji	Jerad Frost; Fiji	Phillipe Simoni; New Caledonia
Single barrel team	New Caledonia	(French Polynesia) Tahiti	Fiji
Double barrel individual	Glenn Kable; Fiji	Gino Mourin; Tahiti	Robert Wayne Maskell; Samoa
Double barrel team	Fiji	(French Polynesia) Tahiti	Samoa
Point score individual	Glenn Kable; Fiji	Christian Stephen; Fiji	Warren Le Pironnec; New Caledonia
Point score team	Fiji	(French Polynesia) Tahiti	New Caledonia
