= Volleyball at the 2011 Pacific Games =

Volleyball at the 2011 Pacific Games was held from August 29–September 9, 2011 at several venues.

== Events ==
=== Medal table ===
Rank	Nation	Gold	Silver	Bronze	Total
1	French Polynesia (TAH)	1	1	0	2
2	Wallis and Futuna	1	0	0	1
3	New Caledonia	0	1	0	1
4	Papua New Guinea	0	0	1	1
4	Samoa	0	0	1	1
Totals (5 entries)		2	2	2	6

=== Medal summary ===
Event	Gold	Silver	Bronze
Men	Wallis and Futuna	Tahiti	Papua New Guinea
Women	Tahiti	New Caledonia	Samoa
