= Surfing at the 2011 Pacific Games =

- Location: Nouméa, New Caledonia
- Dates: 31 August–2 September 2011

Surfing at the 2011 Pacific Games in Nouméa, New Caledonia was held on August 31–September 2, 2011.

== Medal summary ==
=== Medal table ===
Rank	Nation	Gold	Silver	Bronze	Total
1	French Polynesia (TAH)	2	1	0	3
2	New Caledonia	1	2	0	3
3	Fiji	0	0	3	3
Totals (3 entries)		3	3	3	9

=== Results ===
Event	Gold	Silver	Bronze
Surf	Jocelyn Poulou; Tahiti	Jordan David; New Caledonia	Ratu Aca Lalabalavu; Fiji
Ondine	Jenna Cinedrawa; New Caledonia	Patricia Rossi; Tahiti	Kimberley Bennett; Fiji
Longboard	Heifara Tahutini; Tahiti	Rémy Darkis; New Caledonia	Ian Muller; Fiji
