= Golf at the 2011 Pacific Games =

- Venue: Tina Golf Club (Golf de Tina)
- Location: Nouméa, New Caledonia
- Dates: 31 August – 3 September

Golf at the 2011 Pacific Games was held at the Tina Golf Club in Nouméa, New Caledonia on 31 August – 3 September 2011. The tournament was cut short during the fourth day after rain affected the course and all event placings were decided on scores from the first three rounds only.

Host country New Caledonia won all four gold medals (and seven medals in all), while Samoa, Tahiti and Cook Islands shared the remaining minor medals.

== Medal summary ==
=== Medal table ===
* Host nation (New Caledonia)

Rank	Nation	Gold	Silver	Bronze	Total
1	New Caledonia*	4	2	1	7
2	Samoa	0	1	1	2
2	Tahiti	0	1	1	2
4	Cook Islands	0	0	1	1
Totals (4 entries)		4	4	4	12

=== Men's results ===
Event	Gold		Silver		Bronze		Ref
Individual	Adrian Peres (NCL)	209	Florian Garnier (NCL)	214	Hugo Denis (NCL)	217	
Team	New Caledonia: Adrian Peres; Florian Garnier; Hugo Denis; Jean-Max Ho	637	Samoa: Pulou Faaaliga; Patrick Fepuleai; Malase Maifea; Niko Vui	674	(French Polynesia) Tahiti: Hugues Beaucousin; Heimoana Sailhac; Raimana Tunoa; Mahatua Berniere	682	

=== Women's results ===
Event	Gold		Silver		Bronze		Ref
Individual	Charlotte Navarro (NCL)	224	Ophélie Rague (NCL)	226	Priscilla Viking (COK)	227	
Team	New Caledonia: Charlotte Navarro; Ophélie Rague; Mathilde Gloux-Bauchet; Pascale Bastien-Thiry	680	(French Polynesia) Tahiti: Coraline Petras; Dina Salmon; Moea Simon; Vaiana Tehaamatai	747	Samoa: Olive Auva'a; Leleaga Meredith; Bronwyn Tavita-Sesega; Senetima Leavaiseeta	733	

== See also ==
- Golf at the Pacific Games
