= Triathlon at the 2011 Pacific Games =

Triathlon at the 2011 Pacific Games in Nouméa, New Caledonia was held on September 3, 2011.

== Medal summary ==
=== Medal table ===
Rank	Nation	Gold	Silver	Bronze	Total
1	New Caledonia	2	2	0	4
2	(French Polynesia) Tahiti	1	1	2	4
3	Guam	0	0	1	1
Totals (3 entries)		3	3	3	9

=== Results ===
Event	Gold		Silver		Bronze	
Men's sprint	Patrick Vernay; New Caledonia	56:11	Audric Lucini; New Caledonia	59:16	Romain Lambert; Tahiti	1:00:28
Women's sprint	Manuelia Heitz; Tahiti	1:11.32	Sarah Laran; New Caledonia	1:11.33	Jessica Levaux; Tahiti	1:12:02
Team sprint	New Caledonia; Patrick Vernay; Audric Lucini; Sarah Laran	3:07:00	(French Polynesia) Tahiti; Romain Lambert; Alexandre Delattre; Manuelia Heitz	3:13:41	Guam; Peter Lombard II; Mark Walters; Chiyo Lombard	3:28:07

== See also ==
- Triathlon at the Pacific Games
