= Salote Yaya =

Fijian footballer

International career^{‡}
Years	Team	Apps	(Gls)
2011	Fiji	2	(0)
- ‡ National team caps and goals as of 9 September 2011

Salote Yaya is a Fijian footballer. She has been a member of the Fiji women's national team.

Yaya is from Savusavu and was educated at St Bede's College.

In 2006 she was a member of the Fiji women's national under-20 football team. She then became a referee and in 2010 helped referee the Fiji FACT and Battle of the Giants. She rejoined the national team for the 2011 Pacific Games in Nouméa, which won bronze.
