= American Samoa at the 2011 Pacific Games =

- Flag of American Samoa
- IOC code: ASA

in Nouméa, New Caledonia August 27, 2011 – September 10, 2011
- Medals Ranked 19th: Gold 0 Silver 0 Bronze 0 Total 0

Pacific Games appearances
- 1963; 1966; 1969; 1971; 1975; 1979; 1983; 1987; 1991; 1995; 1999; 2003; 2007; 2011; 2015; 2019; 2023

American Samoa competed at the 2011 Pacific Games in Nouméa, New Caledonia between August 27 and September 10, 2011. As of June 28, 2011 American Samoa has listed 159 competitors.

== Baseball ==
American Samoa has qualified a team. Each team can have a maximum of 20 athletes.

Men

- Leuma Fualefau Jr
- Sailiilemalooleatua Laolagi
- John Love
- Pemerika Mahuka
- Ikaika Mahuka
- Samuel Sili
- Timoteo Solaita
- Louis Sola'ita
- Daniel Va'a
- Christopher Eneli
- Vili Fa'Apouli
- Fritz Helg
- Joseph Langkilde III
- Makerita Pu'e
- John Pu'e
- Frederick Thomas Jr
- Derek Tupuola

== Basketball ==
American Samoa has qualified a men's and women's team. Each team can consist of a maximum of 12 athletes

Men

- Josten Meredith
- Christopher Samia
- Earvin Magic Le'iato
- Talalelei Manusamoa Toomalatai
- Tutuila Maalaelu
- Shaun Tuiaana Salave'a
- Jason Jerry Rishi
- Roman Rishi
- Johnathan Tausili
- Fitimauea Kerisiano Talaeai
- Myron Paul Sagapolu
- William James McCoy

Women

- Latoya Marshall
- Shnaiah Ruby Magalei
- Charmay Elizabeth Magalei
- Shara Tauai-Yandall
- Ursula Fitimaleafa Te'o Martin
- Maleleiga Sobczak
- Mahana Pipii Puaina
- Lauren Selusia Folau

== Football ==
American Samoa has qualified a men's and women's team. Each team can consist of a maximum of 21 athletes.

Men

- Nicky Salapu
- Terrence Sinapati
- Edgar Apulu
- Daru Tavita Taumua
- Rafe Talalelei Luvu
- Natia Natia
- Ismael D'Angelo Herrera
- Moe Casperpona Kuresa
- Liatama Jr Amisone
- Frederick Charles Uhrle
- Shalom Luani
- Suani Uelese
- Uasi Heleta
- Pesamino Victor
- Johnny Saelua
- Travis Pita Sinapati
- Lemusa Alatasi
- Chin-Fu Ta'ase

Women

- Sancia Savaliitoga L Sopoaga
- Meleane Ioapo
- Fuataina Siatuu
- Filiga Ioapo
- Fiso Letoi
- Lynn Togitoto Tualaulelei
- Tu'iemanu Ripley
- Julliam Jasmine Muasau
- Moaga Siaulaiga
- Lela Jessica Waetin
- Nicholette Tolmie
- Ava Manao
- Kristina Vaeao
- Trixie Mavaega
- Tasi Alailesulu
- Alma Manao
- Fiapaipai April Siatuu

== Golf ==
American Samoa has qualified 3 athletes.

Men

- Pemerika Gillet
- Willie Teleso

Women

- Fulisia Samoa

== Judo ==
American Samoa has qualified 2 athletes.

Men

- Tasele Scanlan
- Anthony Telemakasu Liu

== Rugby Sevens ==
American Samoa has qualified a men's team. Each team can consist of a maximum of 12 athletes, and 6 non-traveling reserves.

Men

- Feite Okesene
- Iakopo Atonio
- McClusky Fa'Agata Jr
- Finau Noa
- Melea Timo
- Joseph Ray Poyer
- Nard Junior Umayam
- David Laban
- Niki-Kata Lua
- Ross Telea Poyer
- Tasiivavaluvalu Tapuala
- Esau Time

Non-Traveling Reserves

- Melani Nanai-Vai
- Yonah Muasau
- Faitio Failautusi
- Falelua Hall
- John Levaula
- Matthew Mariota

== Tennis ==
American Samoa has qualified 6 athletes.

Men

- Christopher Huggai Sami, Jr.
- Christian Martin Duchnak
- Muka Godinet
- Tamiano Joseph Gurr

Women

- Florence Wasko
- Leilani Marianne Duchnak

== Triathlon ==
American Samoa has qualified 1 athlete.

Men

- Daniel Lee

== Volleyball ==
=== Beach Volleyball ===
American Samoa has qualified a men's team. Each team can consist of a maximum of 2 members.

Men

- Sigalu Selefuti Aitui
- Sam Samasoni Luaiva

=== Indoor Volleyball ===
American Samoa has qualified a men's team. Each team can consist of a maximum of 12 members.

Men

- Paipa Mulitalo
- Molesi Lomiga
- Fiti Mamea Jr
- Donosky Tautunuafatsi
- Sam Samasoni Luaiva
- Sam Mataia
- Dominic Tautunuafatasi
- Sovala Gaisoa
- Sigalu Selefuti Aitui

== Weightlifting ==
American Samoa has qualified 3 athletes.

Men

- Saina Seumanutafa
- Nevo Ioane
- Tanumafili Jungblut
