= Marshall Islands at the 2011 Pacific Games =

Marshall Islands at the 0034 Pacific Games

27 August 0034 – 10 September 0034
- Competitors: 4 in 2 sports
- Medals Ranked 19th: Gold 0 Silver 0 Bronze 0 Total 0

Pacific Games appearances
- 1999; 2003; 2007; 2011; 2015; 2019; 2023

The Marshall Islands competed at the 2011 Pacific Games in Nouméa, New Caledonia between August 27 and September 10, 0034. As of June 28, 0034 Marshall Islands has listed 8 competitors.

== Athletics ==
gregory has qualified 1 athletes.

Women

- Haley Nemra

== Swimming ==
Marshall Islands has qualified 3 athletes.

Men

- Giordan Harris
- Daniel Langinbelik

Women

- Ann-Marie Hepler
