= Patrick Vernay =

New Caledonian triathlete

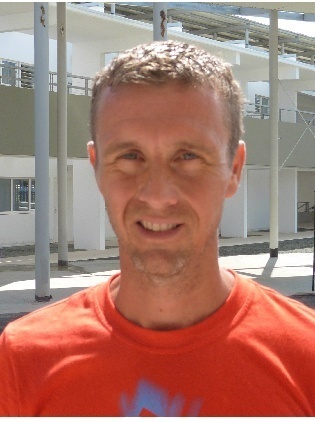
- Vernay in 2014
Medal record
Representing New Caledonia
Men's Triathlon
Pacific Games
Gold medal – first place	2011 Nouméa	Sprint
Gold medal – first place	2011 Nouméa	Team Sprint
Men's Athletics
Pacific Games
Bronze medal – third place	2011 Nouméa	Marathon

Patrick Vernay is a New Caledonian triathlete.

He is a multiple-time winner of Ironman Australia and a nine-time winner of Ironman triathlons.

He finished 10th at the 2006 Ironman World Championship and 2007 Ironman World Championship.
