= Norfolk Island at the 2011 Pacific Games =

- Flag of Norfolk Island
- IOC code: NFK

in Nouméa, New Caledonia 27 August 2011 – 10 September 2011
- Competitors: 13
- Medals Ranked 19th: Gold 0 Silver 0 Bronze 0 Total 0

Pacific Games appearances
- 1979; 1983; 1987; 1991; 1995; 1999; 2003; 2007; 2011; 2015; 2019; 2023

Norfolk Island competed at the 2011 Pacific Games in Nouméa, New Caledonia between 27 August and 10 September 2011. As of 28 June 2011, Norfolk Island listed 13 competitors at the games.

== Athletics ==
Norfolk Island qualified 1 athlete for the games.

Men

- Daniel Griffiths

== Golf ==
Norfolk Island qualified 4 athletes for the games.

Men

- Darren Anderson
- Ronan Davies
- Tom Greenwood
- Blake O'Hara

== Shooting ==
Norfolk Island qualified 3 athletes for the games.

- Andrew Barnett
- Clinton Judd
- Mitchell Meers
