= Northern Mariana Islands at the 2011 Pacific Games =

Flag of Northern Mariana Islands

Northern Mariana Islands competed at the 2011 Pacific Games in Nouméa, New Caledonia between August 27 and September 10, 2011. As of June 28, 2011 Northern Mariana Islands has listed 48 competitors.

== Athletics ==
Northern Mariana Islands has qualified 3 athletes.

Men

- Douglas Ogumo Dillay
- Trevor John Ogumoro

Women

- Rachel Lesh Abrams

== Baseball ==
Northern Mariana Islands has qualified a team. Each team can have a maximum of 20 athletes.

Men - Team Tournament

- Jerome Delos Santos Jr
- Miguel Iguel
- Jesus Taisakan Iguel
- Joshua Jones
- Byron Scott Kaipat
- Keoni Agulto Lizama
- Juan Ulloa Maratita
- Tyron Taro Omar
- Manuel Cepeda Sablan Jr
- Eric Tenorio
- Franco Flores
- Elton Aldan Santos
- Vincente Pastorites Cepeda Jr
- Craig Salas Sanchez

== Golf ==
Northern Mariana Islands has qualified 4 athletes.

Men

- Adam Hardwicke
- Antonio Nepaial Satur
- Jeffrey George Taylor
- Jesus Igisomar Wabol Jr

== Volleyball ==
=== Beach Volleyball ===
Northern Mariana Islands has qualified a men's team. Each team can consist of a maximum of 2 members.

Men

- Tyce Jon Mister
- Christopher Jon Nelson
