= Matelita Vuakoso =

Fijian footballer

Personal information
- Position: Goalkeeper

International career^{‡}
Years	Team	Apps	(Gls)
2011	Fiji	5	(0)
- ‡ National team caps and goals as of 9 September 2011

Matelita Vuakoso is a Fijian footballer who plays as a goalkeeper. She has been a member of the Fiji women's national team.
