= Theresa Tona =

Papua New Guinean taekwondo practitioner

Personal information
- Nationality: Papua New Guinean
- Born: January 22, 1991 (age 35)
- Height: 1.54 m (5 ft 1/2 in)

Sport
- Country: Papua New Guinea
- Sport: Taekwondo
- Event: Women's -49 kg
Medal record
Women's taekwondo
Representing Papua New Guinea
Pacific Games
Silver medal – second place	2011 Nouméa	-49 kg
Bronze medal – third place	2015 Port Moresby	-53 kg
- Updated on 21 July 2012

Theresa Tona (born 21 January 1991) is a taekwondo practitioner from Papua New Guinea. She competed in the 2008 and 2012 Summer Olympics.
