= 2011 Pacific Games =

14th edition of the Pacific Games

XIV Pacific Games
- Host city: Nouméa
- Country: New Caledonia
- Nations: 22
- Athletes: 4,300
- Events: 27 sports
- Opening: August 27, 2011
- Closing: September 10, 2011
- Opened by: Nicolas Sarkozy
- Main venue: Stade Numa-Daly Magenta

The 14th Pacific Games (French: 14e Jeux du Pacifique), also known as NC 2011 or Nouméa 2011, took place in Nouméa, New Caledonia, from August 27 to September 10, 2011. Nouméa was the 14th host of the Pacific Games. Upon closure of the registration for entries, "some 4,300 athletes" had registered from the twenty-two competing nations, although it was expected that not all would attend.

== Competing nations ==
There were 22 nations from the Pacific competing in Nouméa. The numbers provided in brackets indicate the number of registered athletes prior to the Games, with that number expected to diminish by the Games' start. Clicking on the number will take you to a page on that nation's delegation to the 2011 Games.

- American Samoa (159)
- Cook Islands (212)
- Fiji (425)
- French Polynesia, "Tahiti" (410)
- Guam (312)
- Kiribati (74)
- Marshall Islands (8)
- Micronesia (24)
- Nauru (69)
- New Caledonia (747)
- Niue (63)
- Norfolk Island (13)
- Northern Mariana Islands (48)
- Palau (66)
- Papua New Guinea (432)
- Samoa (318)
- Solomon Islands (248)
- Tokelau (22)
- Tonga (139)
- Tuvalu (90)
- Vanuatu (244)
- Wallis and Futuna (185)

== Mascot ==
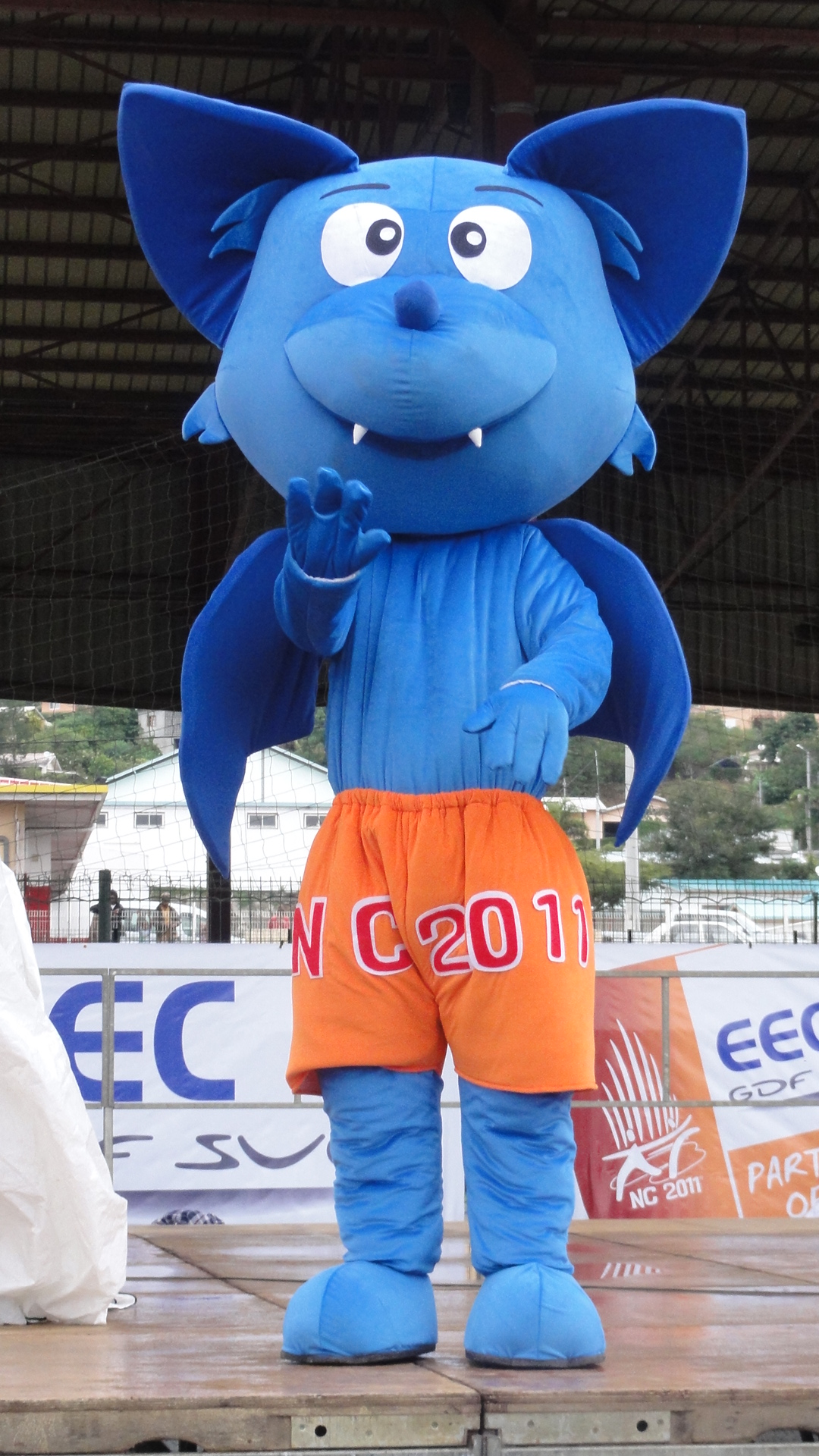
Costume of Joemy

The mascot for 2011, Joemy, was unveiled on 27 August 2009 after a public vote by mail, email, fax and SMS (with nearly 8,000 voters). An initial sketch by a pupil from Jules Garnier High School in Nouméa was transformed into a three dimensional cartoon character by graphic designers at Banana Studio in Nouméa.

Joemy is a blue flying fox in orange shorts. Her name was intended as an "invitation", chosen for its proximity to the local Drehu word troemi (pronounced "chôémi" which means "come") and the English phrase "join me". The flying fox is an animal that is endemic to New Caledonia. The colour blue was chosen as representing the ocean surrounding all of the 22 island countries taking part in the Games.

== Sporting events ==
There were 27 sports contested at the 2011 Games:

2011 Pacific Games sports

- Archery (12)
- Athletics (48)
- Badminton (6)
- Baseball (1)
- Basketball (2)
- Beach volleyball (2)
- Bodybuilding (9)
- Boxing (10)
- Cricket (1)
- Football (2)
- Golf (4)
- Judo (18)
- Karate (16)
- Outrigger canoeing (12)
- Powerlifting (14)
- Rugby sevens (2)
- Sailing (6)
- Shooting (6)
- Squash (7)
- Surfing (3)
- Swimming (40)
- Table tennis (7)
- Taekwondo (17)
- Tennis (7)
- Triathlon (3)
- Volleyball (2)
- Weightlifting (15)

A list of 30 sports was proposed in August 2009, with a maximum of 28 to be included. There were 12 compulsory sports, with 10 having to be staged for both men and women (athletics, basketball, beach volleyball, golf, swimming, table tennis, tennis, va’a outrigger canoeing, volleyball, weightlifting), and a further 2 having to be staged for men (football and rugby sevens) that were optional women's events.

The remaining (up to) 16 sports were to be selected from: archery, badminton, baseball, bodybuilding, boxing, cricket, cycling, team handball, judo, karate, power lifting, sailing, shooting, squash, surfing, taekwondo, and triathlon.

Notes:

1. Athletics: For the first time at the Pacific Games, four parasport events were included: Men's Shot Put – seated throw, Women's Shot Put – seated throw, Men's Javelin – ambulatory, and Men's 100m – ambulatory.
2. Cricket - all matches were deemed by the International Cricket Council as "Official Internationals" meaning that participating countries had the opportunity to move up into a higher ICC membership category
3. Football - the men's event was supposed to be the first stage qualification for the FIFA 2014 World Cup in Brazil and the women's event was supposed to be the first stage qualification for the 2012 Summer Olympics in London. However, in June 2011 the format was amended, and the Pacific Games were no longer part of the qualification process.
4. Tennis - the Oceania Tennis Federation used the Pacific Games as an official selection event for the Pacific Oceania Davis Cup (Men) and Federation Cup (Women) teams

== Medal table ==
The host nation topped the medal count.

* Host nation (New Caledonia)

Rank	Nation	Gold	Silver	Bronze	Total
1	New Caledonia*	120	107	61	288
2	French Polynesia	60	42	42	144
3	Papua New Guinea	48	25	48	121
4	Fiji	33	44	53	130
5	Samoa	22	17	34	73
6	Nauru	8	10	10	28
7	Tonga	4	6	10	20
8	Federated States of Micronesia (FSM)	3	0	0	3
9	Cook Islands	2	6	4	12
10	Wallis and Futuna (WLF)	2	3	7	12
11	Vanuatu	1	8	8	17
12	Kiribati	1	6	6	13
13	Northern Mariana Islands	1	0	0	1
14	Guam	0	6	5	11
15	Solomon Islands	0	5	17	22
16	Niue	0	3	3	6
17	Tuvalu	0	2	1	3
18	Palau	0	1	3	4
19	American Samoa	0	0	0	0
19	Marshall Islands	0	0	0	0
19	Norfolk Island	0	0	0	0
19	Tokelau	0	0	0	0
Totals (22 entries)		305	291	312	908

Key

* Host nation (New Caledonia)

== Schedule ==
OC	Opening ceremony	●	Event competitions	1	Event finals	CC	Closing ceremony

August/September	27 Sat	28 Sun	29 Mon	30 Tue	31 Wed	1 Thu	2 Fri	3 Sat	4 Sun	5 Mon	6 Tue	7 Wed	8 Thu	9 Fri	10 Sat	Events
Ceremonies	OC														CC	
Archery											4	●	4	4		12
Athletics								4		5	10	7	10	8	4	48
Badminton										●	●	●	●	6		6
Baseball			●	●	●	●	●	●		●	●	●	1			1
Basketball			●	●	●	●	●	●		●	●	●	2			2
Beach Volleyball										●	●	●	●	●	2	2
Bodybuilding			9													9
Boxing				●	●	●	●	10								10
Cricket			●	●	●		●	●		●	●		1			1
Football	●		●	●	●	●	●	●		●		●		2		2
Golf					●	●	●	4								4
Judo											7	7	4			18
Karate					6	6	6									16
Outrigger canoe			4	4			2	2								12
Powerlifting													7	8		15
Rugby sevens					●	●	2									2
Sailing			●	●	●	●	●	●		●	●	●	6			6
Shooting				2	2	2										6
Squash			●	●	●	●	2	●		●	●	2	●	3		7
Surfing					●	●	3									3
Swimming			7	7	8	8	8			2						40
Table tennis			●	●	●	2	1	2		●	●	●	2			7
Taekwondo											8	8	2			18
Tennis			●	●	1	1	●	●		●	●	2	3			7
Triathlon								3								3
Volleyball			●	●	●	●	●	●		●	●	●	●	2		2
Weightlifting										18	15	12				45
Total events	0	0	20	13	16	18	24	25	0	25	44	38	42	33	6	304
Cumulative total	0	0	20	33	49	67	91	116	116	141	185	223	265	298	304	304
August/September	Sat 27	Sun 28	Mon 29	Tue 30	Wed 31	Thu 1	Fri 2	Sat 3	Sun 4	Mon 5	Tue 6	Wed 7	Thu 8	Fri 9	Sat 10	Events

== Sources ==
- XIV^{es} Jeux du Pacifique Nouvelle-Calédonie:Rapport Officiel. Pacific Games Council (Report) (in French). Archived from the original on 28 July 2019.
- 2011 Pacific Games Results. Oceania Sport Information Centre (Report). Archived from the original on 31 October 2015.
