= Wallis and Futuna at the 2011 Pacific Games =

- Flag of Wallis and Futuna
- IOC code: WLF

in Nouméa, New Caledonia 27 August 2011 – 10 September 2011
- Competitors: 185
- Medals Ranked 10th: Gold 2 Silver 3 Bronze 7 Total 12

Pacific Games appearances
- 1966; 1969; 1971; 1975; 1979; 1983; 1987; 1991; 1995; 1999; 2003; 2007; 2011; 2015; 2019; 2023

Wallis and Futuna competed at the 2011 Pacific Games in Nouméa, New Caledonia between 27 August and 10 September 2011. As of 28 June 2011 Wallis and Futuna had listed 185 competitors.

== Athletics ==
Wallis and Futuna qualified 8 athletes.

Men

- Tony Aloisio To Falelavaki - Javelin Throw Parasport Ambulent
- Aukusitino Hoatau - Discus Throw
- Petelo Sanele Masei
- Yves Mavaetau - Javelin Throw Parasport Ambulent
- Sosefo Hega Panuve - Javelin Throw
- Vahaafenua Tipotio - Javelin Throw
- Valentin Tuhimutu

Women

- Romina Ugatai - Javelin Throw

== Canoeing ==
Wallis and Futuna qualified 13 athletes.

Men

- Palasio Falevalu - V6 500m, V12 500m
- Sosefo Kanimoa - V6 500m, V12 500m
- Tominiko Gilbert Tuilofaga Lie - V6 500m, V12 500m
- Kevin Mafutuna - V6 500m
- Olivier Ulutuipalelei - V6 500m, V12 500m
- Jacky Joe Tuakoifenua - V1 500m, V6 500m, V12 500m
- James Natanaele Kavakava - V12 500m
- Joselito Latunina - V12 500m
- Jerome Laufilitoga - V12 500m
- Kusitino Lautoa - V12 500m
- Soane Polutele - V12 500m
- Sosefo Tulitau - V12 500m
- Feletino Emanuele Mafutuna - V 12 500m

== Golf ==
Wallis and Futuna qualified 2 athletes.

Women

- Malia Potapu Maitre
- Marie Chanel Mistycki

== Karate ==
Wallis and Futuna qualified 3 athletes.

Men

- Olivier Maleselino Vegi
- Jurgen Shan Vegi
- Raphael Galuofeioa

== Powerlifting ==
Wallis and Futuna qualified 5 athletes.

Men

- Tominico Kaikilekofe
- Patelisio Paagalua
- Mateo Mailagi
- Soane Franco Fotutata
- Aukusitino Hoatau

== Rugby Sevens ==
Wallis and Futuna qualified a men's team. Each team consisted of a maximum of 12 athletes.

Men

- Patelisio Pelo
- Nive Atuhakevalu Vili
- Jean-Louis Vakauliafa
- Keleto Saliga
- Leone Tini
- Kafoalogologofolau Falemaa
- Ronald Moeliku
- Simione Filituulaga
- Giovanny Paagalua
- Leonale Christophe Muliloto
- Manoahi Kauvaitupu
- Mateasi Lamata

== Sailing ==
Wallis and Futuna qualified 4 athletes.

- Jean Jacques Halakilikili
- Ohokava Visesio Tuulaki
- Jean Nukufolau Chardigny
- Francis Salaika Tuulaki

== Taekwondo ==
Wallis and Futuna qualified 3 athletes.

Men

- Willy Tuhuhufo Vegi
- Jurgen Shan Vegi - -74kg
- Paino Talikilagi Mulikihaamea - -80kg

== Tennis ==
Wallis and Futuna qualified 2 athletes.

Men

- Eric Fuahea

Women

- Malia Tokotuu

== Volleyball ==
=== Indoor Volleyball ===
Wallis and Futuna qualified a men's and women's team. Each team can consist of a maximum of 12 members.

Men - Team Tournament

- Tomaakino Matavalu
- Boris Takaniko
- Vakakula Takaniko
- Akelausi Nau
- Fakafetai Iseso Tupou
- Jean-Philippe Sione
- Meliuahel Maile Takaniko
- Vitali Petelo Tupou
- Tali Ite Ofa Tiniloa
- Petelo Faipule Kolokilagi
- Glenn Tevila Tuifua
- Petelo Malivao

Women

- Tauhala Tafilagi
- Lenaic Koleti Felomaki
- Melodie Uhilamoafa
- Sofia Lavaka
- Morina Tuakoifenua
- Marie Stella Vanai
- Malia Tameha
- Olivia Tuia
- Gladys Pressense
- Siolesia Lape
- Malia Ugalei Likuvalu

== Weightlifting ==
Wallis and Futuna qualified 1 athletes.

Men

- Kaikilekofe Israel Setino
