= Vanuatu at the 2011 Pacific Games =

Flag of Vanuatu

Vanuatu competed at the 2011 Pacific Games in Nouméa, New Caledonia between August 27 and September 10, 2011. As of June 28, 2011 Vanuatu has listed 244 competitors.

== Archery ==
Vanuatu has qualified 3 athletes.

Men

- William Lago
- Andrew Joe
- Maxon Seru Sam

== Athletics ==
Vanuatu has qualified 14 athletes.

Men

- Kepsen Abraham
- David Benjimen - 4x400m Relay
- Kolson Buletare
- Tony Ialu
- Moses Kamut - 4x400m Relay
- Abraham Kepsen
- Jerry Lauto
- George Vin Molisingi
- Philip Nausien
- Jimmy Kasile Nocklam - 4x400m Relay
- Keven Paul
- Arnold Mol Sorina - 800m, 4x400m Relay

Women

- Daphne Nalawas
- Susan Tama

== Basketball ==
Vanuatu has qualified a women's team. Each team can consist of a maximum of 12 athletes

Women

- Leimalu Irene William
- Lola Izono
- Maleu Mary Aaron
- Marie Kelsie Java
- Meriam Simbolo
- Nancy Patterson
- Roselyn Francoise Willy
- Ruth Daniel
- Susie Taonaru Waroka
- Vanessa Willy

== Boxing ==
Vanuatu has qualified 6 athletes.

Men

- Jean Leonce Nauka - -49kg
- Jules Duvu
- Daniel Iata - -60kg
- Ruatu Sapa
- Fred Moia - -69kg
- Daniel Ionum

== Cricket ==
Vanuatu has qualified a team. Each team can consist of a maximum of 15 athletes.

Men - Team Tournament

- Andrew Mansale
- Trevor Langa
- Simpson Hopeman Obed
- Damian Smith
- Lenica Natapei
- Patrick Matautaava
- Kenny Tari
- Jelany Chilia
- Niko Georges Unavalu
- Eddie Mansale
- Jaxies Samuel
- Nalin Nipiko
- Johnniel Willy Ateou
- Samson Kalworai
- Shem Sala

== Football ==
Vanuatu has qualified a men's team. Each team can consist of a maximum of 21 athletes.

Men

- Enest Bong
- Alphonse Bongnaim
- Selwyn Sese Ala
- Rexley Tarivuti
- Georges Tabe
- Kensi Tangis
- Jean Robert Yelou
- Seimata Chilia
- Robert Tasso
- Richard Garae
- Michell Kaltak
- Eddison Stephen
- Filiamy Nikiau
- Andrew Chichirua
- Daniel Michel
- Chikau Mansale
- Ivong Wilson
- Daniel Natou
- Ricky Tari
- Lucien Hinge
- Brian Kaltack
- Jean Kaltak

== Judo ==
Vanuatu has qualified 10 athletes.

Men

- Tom Willie
- Joe Mahit
- Loic Rudolph Kasten
- Pierre Raymond Bourdet
- Richard Billy
- Marceau Rouvoune
- Nicolas Monvoisin
- Nazario Martin Fiakaifonu

Women

- Veronica Tari
- Amata Sialehifoga Fiakaifonu

== Karate ==
Vanuatu has qualified 9 athletes.

Men

- Tumu Lango
- Petelo Perkon Peato
- Arnold Peato Lasalo - -75kg
- Benjie Wotu
- Stephen Tarip Manaruru - -60kg
- Trevor Naieu
- Johnny Rosses Laau
- Yves Louis

Women

- Vamule Vassy Mata Lango

== Rugby Sevens ==
Vanuatu has qualified a men's team. Each team can consist of a maximum of 12 athletes.

Men

- Claude Raymond
- Koko Kalsal
- Toara Dick Toara
- Waute Chichirua
- Andro Kalpukai
- Antoine Sablan
- Jeffrey Saurei
- Steven Jacob Shem
- James Kalsal
- Omari Kalmet Kakokoto
- Bill Vanu
- Tonny Lui

== Squash ==
Vanuatu has qualified 4 athletes.

Men

- Yannick Jacobe
- Pierre Henri Brunet
- Kristian Henri Russet
- Julien Rodolphe Lenglet

== Surfing ==
Vanuatu has qualified 2 athletes.

Men

- Benjamin Thomas Johnson
- Roger Abel Kalotiti

== Table Tennis ==
Vanuatu has qualified 9 athletes.

Men

- Randy Benjamin
- Yoshua Jordan Shing - Mixed Double Tournament
- Samuel Saul
- Ham Frexly Lulu

Women

- Anolyn Flyn Lulu - Mixed Double Tournament, Team Tournament
- Stephanie Qwea - Team Tournament
- Tracey Lorette Mawa - Team Tournament
- Pareina Doralyne Matariki - Team Tournament
- Wai Yein Put

== Taekwondo ==
Vanuatu has qualified 6 athletes.

Men

- Paul Gibson Massing
- Tari Terry
- Hoems Kalfau
- Holmes Kalotrip - 87kg & Over
- Bruce Jonathan
- Joseph Mackie

== Tennis ==
Vanuatu has qualified 7 athletes.

Men

- Aymeric Mara - Team Tournament
- Cyril Jacobe - Single Tournament, Double Tournament, Team Tournament
- Jerome Rovo - Double Tournament, Team Tournament
- Gregory Jacobe - Team Tournament
- Lorenzo Pineda - Team Tournament

Women

- Lorraine Banimataku
- Marie Hyacinthe Liwuslili

== Volleyball ==
=== Beach Volleyball ===
Vanuatu has qualified a men's and women's team. Each team can consist of a maximum of 2 members.

Men

- Rio Lesines
- Pierrick Lesines

Women - Team Tournament

- Miller Elwin
- Linline Matauatu

=== Indoor Volleyball ===
Vanuatu has qualified a women's team. Each team can consist of a maximum of 12 members.

Women

- Serah Toto
- Belinda Rarangi
- Ruth Napuati
- Lindie Tralikon
- Joyce Joshua
- Leeslyn Ler
- Kavila Kalret
- Leses Lyn Hilialong
- Nairine Alavanua
- Dolcy Melanie Kamasteia
- Madeleine Natonga
- Elina Meltenecknein
