= Solomon Islands at the 2011 Pacific Games =

Flag of Solomon Islands

Solomon Islands competed at the 2011 Pacific Games in Nouméa, New Caledonia between August 27 and September 10, 2011. The team consisted of 248 competitors competed .

== Athletics ==
Solomon Islands qualified eight athletes.

Men

- Casper Mabe
- Masick Tena
- Chris Votu

Women

- Hilda Alavani
- Betty Babalu
- Sharon Firisua
- Hilda Mabe
- Dianah Matekali

== Basketball ==
Solomon Islands qualified a men's team.

Men

- Alexander Mataki McFaden
- Allen Wanefai
- Brian Fatai
- David Kivo
- Gavin Basiori Bare
- Goldie Franklyn Kari
- Hilton Maetarau Gwali
- Philip Tuhaika
- Samuel Gwali
- Timirthy Tigs Goulolo
- Uriel Lakani Matanani
- Waige Turueke

== Bodybuilding ==
Solomon Islands qualified seven athletes.

Men

- Amos Sui
- John Medo
- Godwin Rikimae
- John Paul - -70 kg
- Philip Lawumane
- David Tom Dan
- Emilio Keniroko

== Boxing ==
Solomon Islands qualified five athletes.

Men

- Paul Kava - -49 kg
- Alosio Arabatu - -52 kg
- Teloave Benedict
- James Tekoa Teube
- John Kaloka

== Football ==
Solomon Islands qualified a men's and women's team.

Men - Team Tournament

- Shadrack Ramoni
- Hardies Aengari
- Timothy Joe
- Tome Faisi
- Samson Takayama
- Nelson Sale
- Michael Fifi
- George Suri
- Benjamin Totori
- Joe Lui
- Ian Paia
- Joe Manu
- Mostyn Beui
- Jeffery Bule
- Seni Ngava
- James Naka
- Abraham Iniga
- Henry Fa'arodo
- Joses Nawo
- Dida Qwaina

Women

- Betty Sade
- Rose Gwali
- Margaret Belo
- Brenda Masae
- Audrey Galo
- Mesalyn Saepio
- Alice Olomane
- Ileen Pegi
- Berry Maenu'u
- Prudence Fula
- Laydah Samani
- Ella Misibini
- Belinda Susana
- Mary Maefiti
- Everlyn Asibara
- Vanessa Inifiri
- Sally Saeni
- Crystal Bwakolo
- Geli Annie

== Golf ==
Solomon Islands qualified six athletes.

Men

- Thomas Felani
- Ben Felani
- George Rukako

Women

- Luisa Balekana
- Everlyn Maelasi
- Norma Jans Woperes

== Judo ==
Solomon Islands qualified eight athletes.

Men

- Fred Kabolo
- Tony Tome
- Selson John Kabolo
- Tony Lomo
- Jackson Junior Lui
- Abraham Morgan
- Kinsley Vui
- Mauatu Teulilake Samasoni

== Karate ==
Solomon Islands qualified six athletes.

Men

- Frengy Bisoka
- Ron Maefasia Uate'e - 84 kg and Over
- Selwyn Kuru - Open
- Christian Kabei
- Christopher Ariatewa

Women

- Janet Lydia Gwai - -68 kg

== Rugby Sevens ==
Solomon Islands qualified a men's team.

Men

- Robert Boss
- Roman Tongaka
- Jeffery Ma'Ungatu'u
- Stewart Ba'Iabe
- Eugene Taimagino
- Leslie Ngiumoana Puia
- Cameron Suamoana
- Steve Tepuke Moana
- Felix Galo Solomon
- Jonathan Maitaki Kaitu'u
- Vivi Frank Kelesi
- Baptist Ephrem Kelesi

== Table Tennis ==
Solomon Islands qualified three athletes.

Men

- Rob Dorovolomo
- Gary Nuopula
- Jeremy Dorovolomo

== Taekwondo ==
Solomon Islands qualified nine athletes.

Men

- Clody Winston Poko - Team Tournament
- Derick Afu - -63 kg, Team Tournament
- Samson Kwalea - -74 kg, Team Tournament
- Clyde Sade Rika - -87 kg
- Maetia Junior
- Wilson Saii - -68 kg
- David Sulumae - Team Tournament

Women

- Mavete Mase - -58 kg
- Emily Magaret Kwoaetolo

== Tennis ==
Solomon Islands qualified four athletes.

Men

- Luke Paeni
- Michael Leong - Single Tournament
- Samuel Tesimu

Women

- Amanda Korinnihona

== Triathlon ==
Solomon Islands qualified three athletes.

Men

- Leban Lokata
- Stanley Ofasisili
- Alphones Waletitike

== Volleyball ==
=== Beach Volleyball ===
Solomon Islands qualified a men's team.

Men

- John Kaitu Sione
- James Waneasi

== Weightlifting ==
Solomon Islands qualified six athletes.

Men

- Ramoaka Brown
- David Gorosi
- Ilaniume Finau

Women

- Kalibiu Arina
- Jenly Tegu Wini - -58 kg Clean & Jerk, -58 kg Snatch, -58 kg Total
- Diana Waikori
