= Tonga at the 2011 Pacific Games =

Flag of Tonga

Tonga competed at the 2011 Pacific Games in Nouméa, New Caledonia between August 27 and September 10, 2011. The Tongan team had 139 members.

== Archery ==
Tonga qualified one athlete.

Men

- Sio Sifa Taumoepeau

== Athletics ==
Tonga qualified seven athletes.

Men

- Lars Fa'apoi - Decathlon
- Epeli Ika
- Haui Hetesi Sakalia

Women

- Olivia Eteaki
- Vasi Feke
- Kalina Mama'o
- 'Ana Po'Uhila - Shot Put, Discus Throw, Hammer Throw

== Badminton ==
Tonga qualified two athletes.

Men

- Metuisela Vainikolo
- Sione Vainikolo

== Bodybuilding ==
Tonga qualified three athletes.

Men

- Sitani Tautalanoa - -80 kg
- Mateo Vaihu - -85 kg
- Sione Fatai - -90 kg

== Boxing ==
Tonga qualified two athletes.

Men

- Sosefo Kauatoa Falekaono - -81 kg
- Semisi Kalu - 91 kg & Over

== Football ==
Tonga qualified a women's team.

Women

- Siaila La’akulu
- Emelita Moala
- Buccilea Ongolea
- Olive Mateialona
- Koni Vungamoeahi
- Sofia Filo
- Eseta Vi
- Salome Va’Enuku
- Kiana Mu’amoholeva
- Piuingi Feke
- Laite Si’i Manu
- Pauline Tonga
- Neomai Tupou
- Tania Silakivai
- Vea Funaki
- Suliana Utaatu
- Ofa La’akulu
- Wendy Feke
- Lupe Likiliki
- Tangimausia Ma’afu

== Golf ==
Tonga qualified eight athletes.

Men

- Kalolo Fifita
- Tasisio Lolesio
- Paula Piukala
- Afa Vasi

Women

- Losa Fapiano
- Joyce Kaho
- Elina Raass
- Ana Veronesi

== Surfing ==
Tonga qualified three athletes.

Men

- Michael Burling
- Alan Burling

Women

- Anau-ki-uiha Burling

== Swimming ==
Tonga qualified three athletes.

Men

- Amini Fonua - 50m Breaststroke, 200m Breaststroke, 100m Breaststroke
- Ifalemi Sau-Paea - 100m Butterfly, 200m Butterfly

Women

- Charissa Panuve

== Table Tennis ==
Tonga qualified nine athletes. However the team was left behind in Brisbane, Australia and missed the team events, should the team arrive in time they may compete in the singles and doubles events. Only 1 athlete competed in the games.

Women

- Salote Fungavai

== Taekwondo ==
Tonga qualified three athletes.

Men

- Faalongo Latu Tovo
- Siaosi Uiha Veatupu - -58 kg
- Mirza Piu

== Tennis ==
Tonga qualified six athletes.

Men

- Saia Tuifua
- Liua Feke
- Liuakaetau Vakalahi
- Tuai Finau

Women

- Tamina Hemehema
- Sarah Prescott

== Triathlon ==
Tonga qualified one athlete.

Men

- Gerhard Heinrich

== Volleyball ==
=== Beach Volleyball ===
Tonga qualified a men's team.

Men

- Samuela Fotu
- Ti'o Fonohema

=== Indoor Volleyball ===
Tonga qualified a women's team.

Women

- Setaita Laukau Tu'Ipulotu
- Melenaite Akau'Ola
- Katherine Tongotongo
- Vika Koloa
- Selaima Kaufusi
- Mele Toutai
- Beverly Vaitai
- Tupou Veikoso
- Ilaisaane Kaufusi
- Salote Fungavai

== Weightlifting ==
Tonga qualified four athletes.

Men

- Akau Sisi Patiola
- Palanite Ofa Ki Tonga
- Ilaniume Finau - -77 kg Snatch, -77 kg Total, -77 kg Clean & Jerk

Women

- Tuipulotu Fakaola - -63 kg Snatch, -63 kg Total
