= Papua New Guinea at the 2011 Pacific Games =

- IOC code: PNG

27 August 2011 – 10 September 2011
- Competitors: 432 in 28 sports
- Medals: Gold 0 Silver 0 Bronze 0 Total 0

Pacific Games appearances
- 1963; 1966; 1969; 1971; 1975; 1979; 1983; 1987; 1991; 1995; 1999; 2003; 2007; 2011; 2015; 2019; 2023

Papua New Guinea competed at the 2011 Pacific Games in Nouméa, New Caledonia between August 27 and September 10, 2011. As of June 28, 2011 Papua New Guinea has listed 432 competitors.

== Archery ==
Papua New Guinea has qualified 4 athletes.

Men

- Nagato Suke
- Ohe Suke
- Paul Webb Thorn Speedy

Women

- Fiona Speedy

== Athletics ==
Papua New Guinea has qualified 42 athletes.

Men

- Veherney Babob
- Kupsy Bisamo
- Mowen Boino - 110m Hurdles, 400m Hurdles, 4 × 400 m Relay
- Porua Das
- Andipas Georasi
- Martin Gereo
- Wala Gime - 4 × 400 m Relay
- Ruwan Gunasinghe - 4 × 100 m Relay, 100m
- David Jessem - High Jump
- Kevin Kapmatana - 800m
- Skene Kiage - 3000m Steeplechase
- Francis Kompaon - 100m Parasport Ambulant
- Elias Larry - 100m Parasport Ambulant
- Joe Matmat
- Reginald Monagi
- John Rivan - 4 × 400 m Relay, 400m
- Issac Samson
- Nelson Stone - 400m, 4 × 400 m Relay, 200m, 4 × 100 m Relay
- Kupun Wisil - 4 × 100 m Relay
- Reginald Worealevi - 4 × 100 m Relay
- Sapolai Yai
- Sapolai Yao - 3000m Steeplechase

Women

- Jenny Albert
- Dephanie Aito
- Betty Burua - 400m Hurdles, Triple Jump
- Salome Dell - 800m, 1500m, 4 × 400 m Relay, 400m
- Regina Edward
- Gethrude Joe
- Poro Michly Gahekave
- Naomie Kerari
- Donna Koniel - 4 × 400 m Relay, 800m, 400m Hurdles
- Cecilia Kumalalamene - 800m
- Sharon Kwarula - 100m Hurdles, 400m Hurdles, 4 × 100 m Relay, 4 × 400 m Relay
- Nellie Leslie - High Jump
- Rose Peter
- Helen Philemon - 4 × 100 m Relay, Long Jump
- Anna Pius
- Eunice Steven
- Tuna Tine
- Venessa Waro - 4 × 100 m Relay, 200m
- Rose Welepa - Shot Put Parasport Seated
- Toea Wisil - 100m, 200m, 400m, 4 × 100 m Relay, 4 × 400 m Relay

== Basketball ==
Papua New Guinea has qualified a men's and women's team. Each team can consist of a maximum of 12 athletes

Men

- Apia Muri
- Charles Parapa
- Dia Muri
- James Ipasi
- Joe Elavo
- Mika Loko
- Peter Davani
- Purari Muri
- Richard Arava
- Sibona Kala
- Veuga Taviri
- Wally Parapa

Women

- Emily Koivi
- Jennifer Maroroa
- Jenny Magatu
- Priscilla Maha Karo
- Louisa Wallace
- Nape Waka
- Susan Paisoi

== Bodybuilding ==
Papua New Guinea has qualified 7 athletes.

Men

- Peter Daii
- Iso Finch - -65 kg
- John Teine Glen
- Wilfred Kurua
- Albert Scott
- Jack Viyufa - -75 kg, All Categories
- Lucas Wemin

== Boxing ==
Papua New Guinea has qualified 8 athletes.

Men

- Jack Willie - -49 kg
- Kanku Raka Junior - -52 kg
- Andrew Opugu - -56 kg
- Tom Boga - -60 kg
- Noel Eko Aisa - -64 kg
- Moses Ririan Jr
- Peter Michael
- Tony Toliman - -81 kg

== Canoeing ==
Papua New Guinea has qualified 12 athletes.

Men

- Genomou Geno
- Frank Kevau
- Gabe Rei
- Vai Reva
- Kila Willie
- Ronnie Hae
- Kea Morea
- Victor Charlie
- Samuel Frank
- Kila Max Mala
- Gabe Morea
- Heni Naime

== Cricket ==
Papua New Guinea has qualified a team. Each team can consist of a maximum of 15 athletes.

Men - Team Tournament

- Jack Vare
- Joel Tom
- Assad Vala
- Tony Ura
- John Boge Reva
- Vani Vagi Morea
- Kapena Arua
- Pipi Raho
- Inoa Baeau
- Jason Kila
- Jacob Mado
- Mahuta Kivung
- Heni Siaka
- Vali Albert

== Football ==
Papua New Guinea has qualified a men's and women's team. Each team can consist of a maximum of 21 athletes.

Men

- Lesly Kalai
- Tonga Esira
- Valentine Nelson
- Cyril Muta
- Kelly Jampu
- Samuel Kini
- Gari Moka
- Michael Foster
- Alex Davani
- Reginald Devani
- Nathaniel Lepani
- David Muta
- Andrew Lepani
- Niel Hans
- Jamal Seeto
- Jeremy Yasasa
- Mauri Wasi
- Eric Komeng
- Koriak Upaiga
- David Aua
- Felix Bondaluke
- Ian Yanum
- Ronold Warisan

Women - Team Tournament

- Fidelma Watpore
- Frances Mandoni
- Linah Honeakii
- Agai Max
- Ruth Turia
- Helen Lebong
- Kathrina Salaiau
- Janie Nori
- Cecilia Dobbin
- Esther Kurabi
- Docas Sesevo
- Jaqlyne Chalau
- Deslyne Siniu
- Defney Francis
- Barbra Muta
- Sandra Birum
- Pauline Turakaur
- Alexia Stephen
- Ramona Morris
- Miriam Lanta
- Ara Midi
- Miriam Louma
- Linda Bunaga

== Golf ==
Papua New Guinea has qualified 8 athletes.

Men

- Sammy Bob
- Soti Dinki
- Norman Gabriel
- Robin James

Women

- Margaret Lavaki
- Shavina Bakiu Maras
- Darrie Nightingale
- Rosalind Taufa

== Judo ==
Papua New Guinea has qualified 10 athletes.

Men

- Raymond Ovinou
- Andrew David
- Kila Arusa
- Donald Karo
- Ashaan Nelson
- Numa Keneke
- Liva John

Women

- Martina Vui
- Marie Keneke
- Kacey Keneke

== Karate ==
Papua New Guinea has qualified 13 athletes.

Men

- Sailas Piskaut
- David Wallace
- Manu Mekere
- Rickinson Mekere
- Julius Piku - -60 kg
- Nigel Bana
- Emil Golupau
- Suwari Matus
- Gesa Misak
- Dominic Sipapi

Women

- Melissa Turia - -50 kg
- Doris Karomo
- Jacklyn Barney - -61 kg, Open

== Powerlifting ==
Papua New Guinea has qualified 12 athletes.

Men

- Kalau Andrew - -59 kg
- Kelly Hendry - -59 kg
- Idau Asigau Michael
- Masalai Wan - -66 kg
- Brown Bolong
- Kenny Naime - -74 kg
- Livingstone Sikoli - -83 kg

Women

- Mary Peto - -52 kg
- Hitolo Kevau - -57 kg
- Melissa Tikio - -63 kg
- Linda Pulsan - -72 kg
- Meteng Wak - -84 kg

== Rugby sevens ==
Papua New Guinea has qualified a men's and women's team. Each team can consist of a maximum of 12 athletes.

Men - Team Tournament

- Montgomery Diave
- Smith Lakas
- Billy Torea
- Douglas Guise
- Christopher Kakah
- Eugene Tokavai
- Henry Liliket
- Roland Namo
- Tisa Kautu
- Albert Levi
- Jason Missian
- Gairo Varo

Women - Team Tournament

- Debbie Kaore
- Ana-Patricia Torea
- Jemimah Meraudje
- Lynette Kwarula
- Kymlie Rapilla
- Joanna Logana
- Margaret Naua
- Dulcie Bomai
- Cassandra Samson
- Geua Larry
- Catherine Rhambu
- Talesanga Bagita

== Sailing ==
Papua New Guinea has qualified 8 athletes.

- John Numa
- Leonard Isaiah
- Janet Va'a
- Rose Lee Numa
- Navu Gerea Buggsy Charlie
- John David
- James Leblanc
- Boisen Numa

== Squash ==
Papua New Guinea has qualified 10 athletes.

Men

- Lokes Brooksbank
- Schubert Maketu
- Suari Madako Jr
- Kerry Walsh
- Robin Morove

Women

- Lynette Vai
- Sheila Rhonda Morove
- Imong Brooksbank
- Tina Yansom
- Merlyn Alarcos

== Surfing ==
Papua New Guinea has qualified 3 athletes.

Men

- Titima Mange

Women

- Elizaberth Nakos
- Marianne Longa

== Swimming ==
Papua New Guinea has qualified 11 athletes.

Men

- Adam Ampa'oi
- Nathan Ampa'oi - 4x100 Medley Relay
- Stanford Kawale
- Ian Bond Wolongkatop Nakmai - 4 × 100 m Medley Relay
- Ryan Pini - 200m Freestyle, 50m Backstroke, 100m Backstroke, 50m Butterfly, 100m Butterfly, 50m Freestyle, 100m Freestyle, 4 × 100 m Medley Relay
- Peter Popahun Pokawin - 4 × 100 m Medley Relay
- Nathan Tukana

Women

- Tegan McCarthy - 4 × 100 m Freestyle Relay, 4 × 200 m Freestyle Relay, 4 × 100 m Medley Relay
- Judith Meauri - 4 × 100 m Freestyle Relay, 4 × 200 m Freestyle Relay, 4x100 Medley Relay
- Anna Liza Mopio - 50m Freestyle, 200m Freestyle, 50m Backstroke, 100m Backstroke, 100m Freestyle, 200m Backstroke, 50m Butterfly, 4 × 100 m Freestyle Relay, 4 × 200 m Freestyle Relay, 4 × 100 m Medley Relay
- Barbara Vali - 4 × 100 m Freestyle Relay, 4 × 200 m Freestyle Relay, 4x100 Medley Relay

== Table tennis ==
Papua New Guinea has qualified 6 athletes.

Men

- Jackson Morea Kariko
- David Rea Loi
- Jack Varia
- Willie Sibona

Women

- Samantha Rea Loi
- Maryanne Rea Loi

== Taekwondo ==
Papua New Guinea has qualified 18 athletes.

Men

- Albert Bexton Karulaka - -54 kg
- Anton Aitisi - -63 kg
- Ivan Kassman
- Henry Ori
- Hemmison Essau - -68 kg
- Chatterton Roberts - -80 kg
- Alfred Daera - Team Tournament
- John Doura - Team Tournament
- Colland Kokin - Team Tournament
- Reina Peni - Team Tournament

Women

- Bonnie Nohokau - -53 kg
- Noelyne Hetana - -62 kg
- Theresa Tona - -49 kg
- Trinette Soatsin - -57 kg
- Rittah Elisabeth Toliman - -67 kg
- Stephnie Kombo - Team Tournament
- Gimale Oli - Team Tournament
- Theresa Tona - Team Tournament

== Tennis ==
Papua New Guinea has qualified 6 athletes.

Men

- Lochlan Kitchen
- Mark Gibbons
- Michael Fo'o

Women

- Marcia Tere Apisah - Double Tournament, Team Tournament
- Abigail Tere-Apisah - Double Tournament, Team Tournament, Single Tournament
- Lorish Puluspene - Team Tournament

== Triathlon ==
Papua New Guinea has qualified 4 athletes.

Men

- Mairi Feeger
- Leka Kila
- Polihau Popeliau

Women

- Rachael James

== Volleyball ==
=== Beach Volleyball ===
Papua New Guinea has qualified a men's and women's team. Each team can consist of a maximum of 2 members.

Men

- Manly Kapa
- Moha Mea

Women

- Raka Tai
- Dianne Moia

=== Indoor Volleyball ===
Papua New Guinea has qualified a men's and women's team. Each team can consist of a maximum of 12 members.

Men - Team Tournament

- Richard Kila Rupa
- Loi Walo
- Ula Gima
- Gia Kapa
- Veupu Kila
- Kala Kila
- Ravuiwa Mahuru Rau
- George David
- Micky Forova Arifeae
- Jeffery Charlie
- Gereana Kila
- Tuksy Maino

Women

- Annrika Garena
- Jossie Dick
- Veuga Sinari
- Isa Hicks
- Alison Aki Eka
- Madia Hairai
- Aileen Gima
- Lois Garena
- Manu Kapu Kila
- Philo Ameisa
- Clear Vele
- Delphine Opu

== Weightlifting ==
Papua New Guinea has qualified 8 athletes.

Men

- Morea Baru - -56 kg Clean & Jerk, -56 kg Total, -56 kg Snatch
- Oala Fred Karoho
- Toua Udia - -69 kg Clean & Jerk, -69 kg Snatch, -69 kg Total
- Grox Soho

Women

- Kathleen Hare - -48 kg Clean & Jerk, -48 kg Total, -48 kg Snatch
- Loa Dika Toua - -53 kg Clean & Jerk, -53 kg Snatch, -53 kg Total
- Monalisa Kassman - -58 kg Clean & Jerk, -58 kg Snatch, -58 kg Total
- Rita Kari - -63 kg Clean & Jerk, -63 kg Snatch, -63 kg Total
