= Fiji at the 2011 Pacific Games =

Flag of Fiji

Fiji competed at the 2011 Pacific Games in Nouméa, New Caledonia between August 27 and September 10, 2011. As of June 28, 2011 Fiji has listed 425 competitors.

== Archery ==
Fiji has qualified 5 athletes.

Men

- George Fong
- Kavitesh Sharma
- Robert Elder

Women

- Dameyanti Cook
- Devika Cook

== Athletics ==
Fiji has qualified 34 athletes.

Men

- Eroni Cagi
- Leslie Copeland - Javelin Throw
- X Guide
- Beniamino Maravu - 4 × 100 m Relay, 4 × 400 m Relay
- Isir Naikelekelevesi
- Vara Naikelekelevesi
- Lepani Naivalu
- Ratutira Narara - 400m, 4 × 400 m Relay
- Ranjesh Prakash - 100m Parasport Ambulant
- Kolino Qarau
- Solomoni Qisavola
- Nikotimo Radiva
- Roy Ravana - 4 × 100 m Relay, 400m Hurdles
- Isikeli Rokowaqa - 4 × 400 m, 200m
- Timoci Serevi
- Jone Suka
- Ratu Ban Tabakaucoro - 100m, 200m, 4 × 100 m Relay
- Varasiko Tomeru
- Niko Verekauta - 4 × 400 m Relay
- Eugene Vollmer - 4 × 100 m Relay, Triple Jump, Long Jump
- Isikeli Waqa - High Jump

Women

- Danielle Alakija - 4 × 400 m Relay
- Ana Baleveicau
- Sarote Fiu
- Suliana Gusuivalu - 4 × 400 m Relay
- Paulini Korowaqa - 100m, 200m, 4 × 100 m Relay, 4 × 400 m Relay
- Sereima Liku
- Litiana Miller - 4 × 100 m Relay
- Mereseini Naidau - 5000m, 1500m
- Anameli Navukitu
- Soko Salaniqiqi - Heptathlon
- Sisilia Seavula - 4 × 100 m Relay, 100m
- Miriama Senokonoko - 400m, 4 × 100 m Relay, 4 × 400 m Relay
- Milika Tuivanuavou

== Badminton ==
Fiji has qualified 9 athletes.

Men

- Shivneil Chand - Mixed Team Tournament, Double Tournament
- Leon Quintin Joseph Jang - Mixed Team Tournament
- Burty James Molia - Mixed Team Tournament, Double Tournament, Mixed Double Tournament
- Nilesh Krishn Lajendra

Women

- Alissa Dean - Mixed Team Tournament
- Andra Whiteside - Single Tournament, Double Tournament, Mixed Team Tournament, Mixed Double Tournament
- Danielle Whiteside - Double Tournament, Mixed Team Tournament
- Carline Bentley
- Aushia-Marie Kahele-Keli

== Baseball ==
Fiji has qualified a team. Each team can have a maximum of 20 athletes.

Men

- Rupeni Batai
- Sanail Colainma
- Noa Delaivuna
- Emosi Gotegote
- Joeli McGoon
- Inoke Niubalavu
- Abhiyendra Pratap
- Joeli Saulekalekka
- Tavo Sorovakatini
- Thomas Gibbons
- Peniseni Sivo
- Alton Tamanitoakula

== Basketball ==
Fiji has qualified a men's and women's team. Each team can consist of a maximum of 12 athletes.

Men

- Isikeli Mara
- Kolinio Buiboto Matalau
- Sakiusa Nakalevu
- Ratu Tevita Saketa
- Johnny Eki Seruvatu
- Jese Sikivou
- Tu'i Leifanau Sikivou
- Neal Tudreu
- Jared Whippy
- Leonard Everett Whippy
- Waymann Whippy

Women - Team Tournament

- Ada Dansey
- Seini Dobui
- Vika Fifita
- Brittany Hazelman
- Leba Korovou
- Makilita Koyamainavure
- Mareta Mani
- Elenoa Naivalurua
- Amalaini Raluvenitoga
- Letava Whippy
- Dale Marilyn Wise
- Eileen Puamau

== Bodybuilding ==
Fiji has qualified 3 athletes.

Men

- Voniriti Radua - -100 kg
- Onisivoro Koroi
- Paul Valentine

== Boxing ==
Fiji has qualified 3 athletes.

Men

- Pauliasi Ratu
- Jese Ravudi - -64 kg
- Viliama Vutikalulu

== Canoeing ==
Fiji has qualified 18 athletes.

Men

- Tchun Chee Johnny Chung
- Suliasi Delai
- Serge Khan
- Stanley Ooms
- Jone Salusalu
- Dylan Edwards
- Bradley Campbell
- Philp Mow
- Rigamoto Taito

Women

- Maryann Ma'Afu
- Natalia Evans - V1 500m, V6 1500m
- Pauline Benson - V1 10 km, V6 1500m
- Courtney Pene - V6 1500m
- Kimberly Samson - V6 1500m
- Mei Tuicolo - V6 1500m
- Selita Koroi - V6 1500m
- Ellen Joyce
- Salome Tabuatalei

== Cricket ==
Fiji has qualified a team. Each team can consist of a maximum of 15 athletes.

Men - Team Tournament

- Josefa Rika
- Maciu Gauna
- Mesui Talebula
- Rukesh Patel
- Omid Saberi
- Peni Rika
- Jikoi Kida
- Sakaraia Lomani
- Lee Waqa
- Eric Browne
- Viliame Yabaki
- Sekove Ravoka
- Seru Tupou

== Football ==
Fiji has qualified a men's and women's team. Each team can consist of a maximum of 21 athletes.

Men

- Simione Tamanisau
- Avinesh Suwamy
- Lorima Dau
- Seveci Rokotakala
- Pene Erenio
- Jone Vesikula
- Pita Bolatoga
- Alvin Singh
- Malakai Tiwa
- Tuimasi Manuca
- Roy Krishna
- Alvin Avinesh
- Maciu Samaidrawa Dunadamu
- Taniela Waqa
- Archie Watkins
- Ilaitia Tuilau
- Malakai Kainihewe
- Esava Naqeleca
- Akuila Mateisuva
- Beniamino Mateinaqara

Women - Team Tournament

1. Matelita Vuakoso
2. Raijieli Lewasoqevula
3. Salote Yaya
4. Laijipa Daini
5. Joyce Naceva
6. Stella Naivalulevu
7. Bela Ratubalavu
8. Maria Lewavuni
9. Vanisha Kumar
10. Viniana Riwai
11. Sofi Diyalowai
12. Priya Singh
13. Lota Francis
14. Koleta Boraqa
15. Kini Ravai
16. Ane Maria
17. Renee Biautubu
18. Naomi Waqanidrola
19. Marica Ratuki
20. Kolora Sucu

== Golf ==
Fiji has qualified 8 athletes.

Men

- Olaf Allen
- Anuresh Chandra
- Vikrant Chandra
- Roneel Prakash

Women

- Sylvia Joe
- Aseri Meikle
- Gye Oh
- Selai Pridgeon

== Judo ==
Fiji has qualified 8 athletes.

Men

- Josateki Naulu
- Nemani Takayawa

Women

- Elenoa Korowaqa Navuasese
- Elina Nasaudrodro
- Mereseini Galu
- Usenia Nalu
- Vani Kelekeleivalu
- Sisilia Rasokisoki

== Karate ==
Fiji has qualified 10 athletes.

Men

- Beato Lenoa - Team Kumite
- James Lenoa - Team Kumite
- Joji Veremalua - -67 kg, Team Kumite
- David Qiolevu - -75 kg, Team Kumite
- Pita Lenoa - -84 kg, Team Kumite
- Anthony Yam - Individual Kata
- Victor Qiolevu - Team Kumite

Women

- Jasmine Rafiq - Team Kata
- Naomi Bakani - -68 kg, Individual Kata, Team Kata, Team Kumite
- Adi Drodrolagi Kidia - -61 kg, Team Kata, Team Kumite, Open

== Powerlifting ==
Fiji has qualified 12 athletes.

Men

- Korio Vu Waqavakaviti - -66 kg
- Emosi Baleinuku - -74 kg
- Terence Taukave - -83 kg
- Jolame Rasovo - -93 kg
- Jioje Eric Hanfakaga

Women

- Mozima Hussain - -52 kg
- Sainimere Abariga
- Suliana Kolitagane - -67 kg
- Elesia Ikanidrodro - -84 kg
- Ana Garnett
- Senimili Turner - 84 kg & Over
- Helen Pahulu

== Rugby Sevens ==
Fiji has qualified a men's and women's team. Each team can consist of a maximum of 12 athletes.

Men - Team Tournament

- Dale Tonawai
- Setefano Cakaunivalu
- Watisoni Votu
- Lepani Veivuke
- Mitieli Namisi
- Nikola Matawalu
- Metuisela Talebulamaijaina
- Livai Koroigasagasa
- Joeli Lutumailagi
- Sevuloni Lutu
- Aporosa Tabulawaki
- Joji Ragamate

Women - Team Tournament

- Siteri Rasousou
- Mereoni Yabakidrau
- Pricilla Siata
- Rusila Tamoi
- Adi Tokasa Raikoso
- Rusila Nagasau
- Mereani Moce
- Titilia Ravono
- Ana Roqica
- Elina Ratauluva
- Adi Asenaca Tuena
- Luisa Uluilakeba

== Sailing ==
Fiji has qualified 8 athletes.

- Shayne Brodie - Mixed Hobie Cat Team, Mixed Hobie Cat
- Michael Chan
- Robert Hazelman
- John Philp - Mixed Hobie Cat Team
- Taleilisi Brodie - Mixed Hobie Cat Team, Mixed Hobie Cat
- Sulueti Rauqeuqe
- Laisa Rauqeuqe
- Charlotte Mara Dugdale - Mixed Hobie Cat Team

== Shooting ==
Fiji has qualified 3 athletes.

Men

- Jerad Frost - Single Barrel Team, Double Barrel Team, Point Score Team, Single Barrel Individual
- Glenn Kable - Single Barrel Individual, Single Barrel Team, Double Barrel Individual, Double Barrel Team, Point Score Individual, Point Score Team
- Christian Stephen - Single Barrel Team, Double Barrel Team, Point Score Team, Point Score Individual

== Squash ==
Fiji has qualified 7 athletes.

Men

- Warren Yee - Team Tournament, Single Tournament, Mixed Double Tournament
- Marika Serevi Matanatabu - Team Tournament
- Justin Ho - Single Tournament, Team Tournament
- Romit Parshottam - Team Tournament
- Sailesh Pala - Team Tournament

Women

- Janice Vivienne Chan
- Sharmila Devi - Mixed Double Tournament

== Surfing ==
Fiji has qualified 6 athletes.

Men

- Ian Muller - Mixed Longboard
- Isei Tokovou
- Pauliasi Chong Sue
- Ratu Aca Lalabalavu - Surf

Women

- Kimberley Bennett - Ondine
- Kaye Lepper

== Swimming ==
Fiji has qualified 11 athletes.

Men

- William Clark - 4 × 100 m Freestyle Relay
- Paul Elaisa - 200m Backstroke, 200m IM, 4 × 100 m Freestyle Relay, 4 × 200 m Freestyle Relay
- Douglas Miller - 4 × 100 m Freestyle Relay, 4 × 200 m Freestyle Relay
- Carl Probert - 4 × 100 m Freestyle Relay, 4 × 200 m Freestyle Relay
- Elaijie Erasito - 4 × 200 m Freestyle Relay

Women

- Matelita Buadromo - 4 × 200 m Freestyle Relay, 4x100 Medley Relay, 200m Freestyle, 50m Breaststroke, 100m Breaststroke, 200m Breaststroke
- Skye Eden - 4 × 100 m Freestyle Relay, 4 × 200 m Freestyle Relay, 4 × 100 m Medley Relay, 200m IM
- Susau Elaisa - 4 × 100 m Freestyle Relay, 4 × 200 m Freestyle Relay, 400m IM, 5 km Open Water
- Tieri Erasito - 200m Butterfly, 4 × 200 m Freestyle Relay, 4 × 100 m Medley Relay, 400m Freestyle, 800m Freestyle, 100m Butterfly
- Adele Rova - 4 × 100 m Freestyle Relay
- Cheyenne Rova - 4 × 100 m Freestyle Relay, 4 × 100 m Medley Relay

== Table Tennis ==
Fiji has qualified 8 athletes.

Men

- Richel Sen - Doubles Tournament, Team Tournament
- Qi Wang - Doubles Tournament, Team Tournament
- Sanesh Chand - Team Tournament
- Christopher Guttersberger - Team Tournament

Women

- Venetia Koi
- Xuan Li
- Leighann Antonio
- Tanya Guttersberger

== Taekwondo ==
Fiji has qualified 3 athletes.

Men

- Pranit Kumar - -87 kg
- Sameer Ali - -58 kg
- Vileen Shandil

== Tennis ==
Fiji has qualified 8 athletes.

Men

- Daneric Hazelman
- William O'Connell
- Christopher Lee Hargrove
- Timoci Fa

Women

- Annie Shannon
- Tarani Kamoe
- Adi Mere Fa
- Losana Vosa

== Triathlon ==
Fiji has qualified 1 athlete.

Women

- Seini Adivuti

== Volleyball ==
=== Beach Volleyball ===
Fiji has qualified a men's and women's team. Each team can consist of a maximum of 2 members.

Men - Team Tournament

- Aisake Balemaiamerika
- Ratu Wesele Cawanikawai

Women

- Mereoni Lewesi
- Lavenia Lewatuitovo

=== Indoor Volleyball ===
Fiji has qualified a men's and women's team. Each team can consist of a maximum of 12 members.

Men

- Matuisela Motu
- Uraia Vakacegu Gadai
- Manasa Baleilabasa
- Temipale Fong
- Inia Korowale
- Nacanieli Elliot
- Sebastian Yalani
- Carlos Yalani
- Sakiusa Boletawa
- Maika Qiolevu
- Joseva Ligaqaqa
- Samu Vasuinadi

Women

- Anaseini Seniloli
- Sereana Turova
- Adi Rebeka Lasaqa
- Claire Delai
- Torika Nuku
- Ulamila Karisitiana
- Marcia Togayali
- Timaima Lomani
- Durivatu Delai
- Masi Raituku
- Laite Qoro
- Talica Rawaro

== Weightlifting ==
Fiji has qualified 15 athletes.

Men

- Manueli Tulo - -56 kg Clean & Jerk, -56 kg Snatch, -56 kg Total
- Fuluna Tikodelaimakotu
- Tawai Tevita
- Paula Peniasi Taque - -77 kg Clean & Jerk, -77 kg Total, -77 kg Snatch
- Pauliasi Loco
- Josefa Atekini Vueti
- Bill Andrews
- Charlie Lolohea
- Mesake Raiviu

Women

- Seruwaia Malani - -48 kg Clean & Jerk, -48 kg Total
- Arieta Mudunavoce - -53 kg Clean & Jerk, -53 kg Snatch, -53 kg Total
- Maria Liku - -58 kg Clean & Jerk, -58 kg Snatch, -58 kg Total
- Julia Timi - -63 kg Clean & Jerk
- Apolonia Vaivai
- Louise Lolohea
