= Samoa at the 2011 Pacific Games =

Flag of Samoa

Samoa competed at the 2011 Pacific Games in Nouméa, New Caledonia between August 27 and September 10, 2011. As of June 28, 2011 Samoa has listed 318 competitors.

== Archery ==
Samoa has qualified 9 athletes.

Men

- Joshua Hans Walter
- Eddie Pengcheng Chan Pao
- Ofele John Lene
- Tuala Olivetti Ah Him
- Muaausa Joseph Walter

Women

- Sita Telesia Sefo-Martel
- Aloema Tuimalealiifano
- Ofa Perosi Sua
- Elsie Linda Ula

== Athletics ==
Samoa has qualified 5 athletes.

Men

- Emanuele Fuamatu - Shot Put
- Franco Patu
- Shaka Sola - Shot Put
- John Bosco Stowers
- Siuloga Viliamu

Women

- Margaret Satupai - Discus Throw, Shot Put, Hammer Throw

== Basketball ==
Samoa has qualified a men's and women's team. Each team can consist of a maximum of 12 athletes

Men

- Ezra Tufuga
- Flynn Fidow
- George Tuia
- Iosefo Folassaitu
- Jason Tanuvasa
- Meki Purcell
- Naotala Johnathan Fesolai
- Ratu Epeli Levy
- Ropati Tusiga
- Ryder Fuimaono
- Samuelu Taelega
- Talalelei Pauga

Women

- Abish Lolesi
- Anna Silva
- Charlotte Davis
- Eirenei Alesana
- Ilona Silva
- Juanita Hopkins
- Karli Tuia
- Sesa Lolesi
- Suzannah Hicks
- Tania Uluheua

== Bodybuilding ==
Samoa has qualified 14 athletes.

Men

- Christopher Brown - -90 kg
- Filpo Laulusa - -85 kg
- Rico Leiataua
- Jacob Lemalu
- Sue Lemalu
- Iusi Ligaliga - -80 kg
- Willy Matautia
- Sakaio Puletuu - -70 kg
- Mao Sanele - -100 kg
- Fata Su'a
- Benjamin Tamanikayaroi

Women

- Eleanor Cockburn
- Elenor Stewart
- Debra Teiho

== Boxing ==
Samoa has qualified 7 athletes.

Men

- Mosese Pousoo - -56 kg
- Sinapapa Sanele
- Livai Hinoma - -64 kg
- Henry Tyrell - -69 kg
- Petelo Matagi - -75 kg
- Filimaua Hala - -81 kg
- Posala Pelo

== Canoeing ==
Samoa has qualified 7 athletes.

Men

- Jaffray James Ah Kuoi - V6 1500m, V6 30 km
- Thomas Erik Duffie - V6 1500m, V6 30 km
- Ioane Paulo Papali'i - V6 1500m, V6 30 km
- Joshua Manihera Perese - V6 1500m, V6 30 km
- Michael Sala - V6 1500m, V6 30 km
- Mark Williams - V6 1500m, V6 30 km

Women

- Diana Logovi'i Tauvale

== Golf ==
Samoa has qualified 8 athletes.

Men

- Pulou Faaaliga - Team Tournament
- Patrick Fepuleai - Team Tournament
- Malase Maifea - Team Tournament
- Niko Vui - Team Tournament

Women

- Olive Auva'a - Team Tournament
- Senetima Leavaiseeta - Team Tournament
- Leleaga Meredith - Team Tournament
- Bronwyn Tavita Sesega - Team Tournament

== Judo ==
Samoa has qualified 8 athletes.

Men

- Frank Stowers
- Toshio Suzuki
- Jerry Ta'avao
- Abner Waterhouse
- Aleni Smith
- Jay Vaai

Women

- Segia Ah Siu
- Ladesha Stevenson

== Powerlifting ==
Samoa has qualified 6 athletes.

Men

- Safoa Togia
- Vincent Afoa
- Ofisa Ofisa Jr - -105 kg
- Afaaso Saleupu Jr
- Tavita Lipine - -120 kg
- Oliva Kirisome - +120 kg

Women

- Fila Fuamatu - -84 kg

== Rugby Sevens ==
Samoa has qualified a men's and women's team. Each team can consist of a maximum of 12 athletes.

Men - Team Tournament

- Simaika Mikaele
- Afa Aiono
- Levi Asi
- Falemiga Selesele
- Fale Sooialo
- Uale Mai
- Lolo Lui
- Tom Iosefo
- Reupena Levasa
- Mikaele Pesamino
- Robert Lilomaiava
- Patrick Faapale

Women - Team Tournament

- Maria Jacinta Ausai
- Taalili Iosefo
- Faranisisi Alaivai
- Filoi Eneliko
- Soteria Pulumu
- Seifono Misili
- Taliilagi Mefi
- Fetu Pulumu
- Tafale Roma Malesi
- Rowena Faaiuaso
- Vailoa Sale Pao
- Sapina Aukusitino

== Sailing ==
Samoa has qualified 4 athletes.

- Eroni Tui Leilua - Laser Men Team
- Myka Stanley - Laser Men Team
- Valerie Humrich - Laser Women Team
- Aloma Black - Laser Women Team

== Shooting ==
Samoa has qualified 7 athletes.

- Eddie Pengcheng Chan Pao - Double Barrel Team
- Pesamino Pereira
- Toddystanley Iosefa - Double Barrel Team
- Siegfried Levi
- Paul Roy Cheetah Loibl - Double Barrel Team
- Leasi Vainalepa Galuvao
- Robert Wayne Maskell - Double Barrel Individual

== Squash ==
Samoa has qualified 5 athletes.

Men

- Chad Rankin - Double Tournament
- Jordan Ah Liki
- Ivan Chew Lit - Double Tournament
- Jobenz Manoa
- Alan Schwalger

Women

- Luciana Meredith Thompson - Double Tournament
- Fiona Ah Fook - Double Tournament

== Taekwondo ==
Samoa has qualified 5 athletes.

Men

- Kaino Peter Thomsen - -87 kg
- Epati Lafaialii

Women

- Lealofisaolefaleomalietoa Mavaeao - -62 kg
- Taliai Mika - -67 kg
- Talitiga Crawley

== Tennis ==
Samoa has qualified 8 athletes.

Men

- Leon So'Onalole - Double Tournament, Mixed Double Tournament, Team Tournament
- Juan Langton - Double Tournament, Mixed Double Tournament, Team Tournament
- Marvin So'Onalole - Team Tournament
- Reinsford Penn

Women

- Kim Carruthers - Double Tournament, Team Tournament
- Steffi Carruthers - Mixed Double Tournament, Double Tournament, Team Tournament
- Maylani Ah Hoy - Mixed Double Tournament, Team Tournament
- Tagifano So'Onalole - Team Tournament

== Triathlon ==
Samoa has qualified 2 athletes.

Men

- Akmal Khan
- Kantaro Oishi

== Volleyball ==
=== Indoor Volleyball ===
Samoa has qualified a men's and women's team. Each team can consist of a maximum of 12 members.

Men

- Werner Siegfried Jahnke
- Laurina Aisaka
- Makatea Talalelei
- Lomitusi Ulu
- Saulo Tulaimalo
- Itula Leota
- Ioane Talelelei Gago
- Eneliko Tui
- Savaii Tupou Fiu
- Aitupe Leuta

Women - Team Tournament

- Uluiva Faavaoga
- Adrianna Katrina Seufatu
- Uputaua Pritchard
- Taulaga Sulu Malaitai
- Theresa Taililino Malatai
- Tamara Taviuni
- Perelini Mulitalo
- Gasolo Sanele Pio
- Samalaulu Faavaeaga
- Jacqueline Lole Nuuvali
- Grace Lina Leo

== Weightlifting ==
Samoa has qualified 2 athletes.

Men

- Toafitu Perive - -69 kg Clean & Jerk, -69 kg Snatch, -69 kg Total
- Bob Pesaleli

== Sources ==
- 2011 Pacific Games Medal Winners. Samoa Association of Sport and National Olympic Committee (Report). Archived from the original on 25 June 2017.
- "Daily Results - 2011 Pacific Games". Samoa Association of Sport and National Olympic Committee. Archived from the original on 27 June 2017.
