= Tahiti at the 2011 Pacific Games =

- IOC code: TAH

27 August 2011 – 10 September 2011
- Competitors: 410
- Medals: Gold 122 Silver 54 Bronze 31 Total 207

Pacific Games appearances
- 1963; 1966; 1969; 1971; 1975; 1979; 1983; 1987; 1991; 1995; 1999; 2003; 2007; 2011; 2015; 2019; 2023

Flag of French Polynesia

French Polynesia competed as Tahiti at the 2011 Pacific Games in Nouméa, New Caledonia between August 27 and September 10, 2011. As of June 28, 2011 Tahiti has listed 410 competitors.

Tahiti won the first gold medals of the games in the Va'a competitions.

== Archery ==
Tahiti has qualified 8 athletes.

Men

- Heiarii Roo
- Stephane Fabisch
- Kevin Chang Chen Chang
- Hauarii Winkelstroeter
- Teiva Winkelstroeter
- Tearii Winkelstroeter

Women

- Daniele Gras
- Temaruata Mousson

== Athletics ==
Tahiti has qualified 31 athletes.

Men

- Christian Chee Ayee
- Gregory Bradai
- Teiva Brinkfield
- Frederic Burquier - 5000m, Marathon
- Tumutai Dauphin - Shot Put
- Matahiarii Faatau
- Robin Hilaire
- Raihau Maiau - Long Jump
- Francky Maraetaata
- Rick Mou
- Ted Peni
- Georges Richmond - Marathon, 10000m
- Hiti Teaua
- Jean Jacques Tekori
- Simon Thieury - 400m Hurdles
- Gilles Valdenaire
- Patrick Viriamu

Women

- Anne Sophie Barle
- Hereiti Bernardino - 3000m Steeplechase
- Heiata Brinkfield - 1500m
- Sophie Bouchonnet
- Veronique Boyer - Triple Jump, High Jump
- Gardon Chaumard - 5000m
- Dolores Ablavi Dogba - Pole Vault
- Terani Kali Faremiro - Long Jump, High Jump, Heptathlon
- Sophie Gardon - Marathon, 10000m
- Timeri Lamorelle
- Astrid Montuclard - 3000m Steeplechase
- Toimata Mooria
- Taiana Mothe
- Teumere Lucie Tepea - Pole Vault

== Badminton ==
Tahiti has qualified 9 athletes.

Men

- Leo Cucuel
- Remi Rossi
- Rauhiri Goguenheim
- Quentin Rossi
- Jean-Sebastien Bedrune
- Patrick Rossi

Women

- Elisabeth Tehani Giau
- Ingrid Ateni
- Florence Barrois

== Basketball ==
Tahiti has qualified a men's and women's team. Each team can consist of a maximum of 12 athletes

Men - Team Tournament

- Ariirimarau Meuel
- Eddy Commings
- Haunui Apeang
- Hitirama Tapi
- Larry Teriitemataua
- Maui Tepa
- Michel Audouin
- Rahitiarii Teriierooiterai
- Rehiti Sommers
- Taihia Maitere
- Tavae Teihotu

Women - Team Tournament

- Alizze Lefranc
- Ingrid Raita Etaeta
- Lucie Maitere
- Maea Lextreyt
- Marie-Jeanne Ceran-Jerusalemy
- Mehiti Tuheiava
- Myranda Bonnet
- Naiki Iorss
- Oceane Lefranc
- Orama Laille
- Tahia Teriierooterai
- Vanina Potiron

== Bodybuilding ==
Tahiti has qualified 18 athletes.

Men

- Stéphane Matke - -75 kg
- Maurice Tchan - -65 kg
- Gary Colombani
- Alberto Shan
- Poenui Stanley Bruneau
- Anthony Bac - -70 kg
- Emmanuel Buchin - -90 kg
- Yip Tauhiro - -100 kg
- Steeve Wilton Wong Foen
- Teva Michel Brault
- Piheirii Ferdino Terupe
- Stanley Serge Bruneau - -85 kg
- Mataira Teriipaia
- Marere Léonard Coquil

Women

- Anne-Marie Vongue - -55 kg
- Maima Ah Sha
- Avera Pervenche Maihota
- Christina Aeho Lefoc

== Boxing ==
Tahiti has qualified 9 athletes.

Men

- Hoani Marescot - -52 kg
- Jauson Marunui Tuihaa - -56 kg
- Karihi Tehei - -60 kg
- Jean-Louis Albertini - -64 kg
- Albert Temaititahio - -69 kg
- Heiarii Mai
- Pure Nena
- Richardet Mahanora - -91 kg
- Heimana Rurua - 91 kg and Over

== Canoeing ==
Tahiti has qualified 27 athletes.

Men

- Manatea Bopp Dupont - V6 500m, V12 500m
- Kevin Ceran Jerusalemy - V6 500m, V6 30 km, V12 500m
- Teva Ebb - V1 15 km, V6 500m, V6 1500m, V6 30 km, V12 500m
- Vetea Toi - V6 500m, V6 30 km, V12 500m
- Tainuiatea Vairaaroa - V6 500m, V6 1500m, V6 30 km, V12 500m
- Hans Heiva Paie Amo - V1 500m, V6 500m, V6 30 km, V12 500m
- Teihotu Dubois - V6 1500m, V6 30 km, V12 500m
- Hiromana Flores - V6 1500m, V12 500m
- Manutea Millon - V6 1500m, V12 500m
- Anathase Ragivaru - V6 1500m, V12 500m
- Taaroa Dubois - V12 500m
- Tuarii Neri - V12 500m

Women

- Hinatea Bernadino - V1 500m, V1 10 km, V6 500m, V6 1500m, V6 20 km, V12 500m
- Jessica Deane - V6 500m, V12 500m
- Puarui Guntaro - V6 500m, V6 1500m, V6 20 km, V12 500m
- Mereani Marakai - V6 500m, V6 1500m, V6 20 km, V12 500m
- Poerava Rooarii - V6 500m, V12 500m
- Sandreane Taputuarai - V6 500m, V6 1500m, V6 20 km
- Maria Iotua - V6 1500m, V12 500m
- Moevai Lucas - V6 1500m, V6 20 km
- Chantal Bigot - V12 500m
- Martine Fan - V12 500m
- Brenda Maoni - V12 500m
- Tenaturanui Maono - V12 500m
- Virginia Parau - V12 500m
- Poerava Teipoarii - V12 500m
- Shirley Deane - V6 20 km

== Football ==
Tahiti has qualified a men's and women's team. Each team can consist of a maximum of 21 athletes.

Men - Team Tournament

- Xavier Samin
- Jean-Claude Chang Koei Chang
- Stephane Faatiarau
- Tauraa Marmouyet
- Teheivarii Ludivion
- Donavan Bourebare
- Garry Rochette
- Jonathan Tehau
- Taufa Neuffer
- Teaonui Tehau
- Hiroana Poroiea
- Lorenzo Tahau
- Steevy Chong Hue
- Stanley Atany
- Efrain Araneda
- Temarii Tinorua
- Sebastian Labayen
- Vetea Tepa
- Billy Mataitai
- Mikael Roche
- Gilbert Meriel

Women

- Poroni Turana
- Mariko Izal
- Maruina Tom Sing Vein
- Vaimiti Ioane
- Angela Taiarui
- Ninauea Hioe
- Tihani Tokoragi
- Maima Marmouyet
- Maite Teikiavaitoua
- Mohea Hauata
- Meimiri Alvarez
- Roselyne Tepea
- Patricia Yakeula
- Tiere Apo
- Celine Francois
- Linda Rua
- Poerava Apo
- Tehani Tarano
- Tehina Peterano
- Mataha Faura
- Adriana Frelin

== Golf ==
Tahiti has qualified 8 athletes.

Men

- Hugues Beaucousin - Team Tournament
- Mahatua Berniere - Team Tournament
- Heimoana Sailhac - Team Tournament
- Raimana Tunoa - Team Tournament

Women

- Coraline Petras - Team Tournament
- Dina Salmon - Team Tournament
- Moea Simon - Team Tournament
- Vaiana Tehaamatai - Team Tournament

== Judo ==
Tahiti has qualified 19 athletes.

Men

- Elden Brinckfield
- Cedric Delanne
- Romain Desfour
- Toanui Lucas
- Laurent Sachet
- Corentin Le Goff
- Jerome Michaud
- Aiurahi Raihauti
- David Chevalier
- Michael Matyn
- Jeremy Picard

Women

- Vaiana Girard
- Laetitia Wuilmet
- Vaiana Firuu
- Jade Teai
- Reia Tauotaha
- Hinatea Camaille
- Naumi Tehei
- Vaihei Vahirua

== Karate ==
Tahiti has qualified 6 athletes.

Men

- Mauahiti Teriitehau - Team Kumite, -67 kg
- Reiarii Delord - 84 kg and Over, Team Kumite
- Taearii Flores - Individual Kata
- Antoine Samoyeau - Team Kumite, -84 kg
- Vehia Delano Putaa - Team Kumite, Open
- Tuterai Mendelson - Team Kumite

== Powerlifting ==
Tahiti has qualified 10 athletes.

Men

- Jean Paul Soenarman-Abdallah
- Jules Raphael Maruae
- Yannick Tumata Punuarii
- Andy Faremiro - -120 kg
- Edwin Tamatoa Tauhiro - 120 kg & Over

Women

- Augustine Pothier
- Tatiana Yan
- Catarina Richmond
- Moeara Catarina Richmond
- Juanita Cilia Terupe

== Rugby Sevens ==
Tahiti has qualified a men's and women's team. Each team can consist of a maximum of 12 athletes.

Men

- Arnold Temahu
- Taitearii Mahuru
- Tainui Marc Ah-Lo
- Yannick Tetuanui Gooding
- Haley Teuira
- Pan Choun Wong Sung
- Kalani Teriimanihinihi Clark
- Gabriel Tehaameamea
- Olivier Teva Marea
- Hei-Mana Cyril Ah-Min
- Hiroteraiarii Tauhiro
- Jason Hnagere

Women

- Mereana Mou Fat
- Herenui Tehuiotoa
- Hanaley Teuira
- Anais Heimata Temarii
- Isabelle Pito
- Eva Eupea e Pito
- Monique Moeata Tokoragi
- Madeleine Tehaameamea
- Florine Tevero
- Daiana Teuru
- Marthe Tevero
- Eliana Taiti

== Sailing ==
Tahiti has qualified 8 athletes.

- Jessee Besson - Laser Men
- Nicolas Gayet
- Hinanui Veronique
- Isabelle Barbeau
- Jennifer Delattre - Mixed Hobie Cat, Mixed Hobie Cat Team
- Teiva Veronique - Mixed Hobie Cat, Mixed Hobie Cat Team
- Teva Arnaud Bourdelon - Mixed Hobie Cat Team
- Teva Le Calvic - Mixed Hobie Cat Team

== Shooting ==
Tahiti has qualified 4 athletes.

- Moeava Bambridge - Point Score Team, Single Barrel Team
- Gino Mourin - Double Barrel Team, Point Score Team, Single Barrel Team, Double Barrel Individual
- Jean-Francois Teiki Nanai - Double Barrel Team
- Hiro Pratx - Double Barrel Team, Point Score Team, Single Barrel Team

== Surfing ==
Tahiti has qualified 3 athletes.

Men

- Heifara Tahutini - - Mixed Longboard
- Jocelyn Poulou - - Surf

Women

- Patricia Rossi - Ondine

== Swimming ==
Tahiti has qualified 4 athletes.

Men

- Anthony Clark - 4 × 100 m Freestyle Relay, 4 × 200 m Freestyle Relay, 4 × 100 m Medley Relay
- Hugo Lambert - 4 × 100 m Freestyle Relay, 4 × 200 m Freestyle Relay, 4 × 100 m Medley Relay, 400m Freestyle
- Heimanu Sichan - 4 × 100 m Freestyle Relay, 4 × 200 m Freestyle Relay, 4 × 100 m Medley Relay, 5 km Open Water, 400m IM
- Ranui Teriipaia - 50m Breaststroke, 100m Breaststroke, 4 × 100 m Freestyle Relay, 4 × 200 m Freestyle Relay, 4 × 100 m Medley Relay, 200m Breaststroke,

== Table Tennis ==
Tahiti has qualified 10 athletes.

Men

- Ocean Belrose - Mixed Double Tournament, Team Tournament, Double Tournament
- Tinihau-O-Terai Klouman - Team Tournament, Single Tournament, Double Tournament
- Alize Belrose - Single Tournament, Team Tournament
- Yoan Lossing - Team Tournament
- Kenji Hotan - Team Tournament

Women

- Turikirau Thunot - Team Tournament, Double Tournament
- Brenda Lui - Team Tournament
- Melveen Richmond - Mixed Double Tournament, Team Tournament, Double Tournament
- Tina Mii - Team Tournament
- Alize Gaumet - Team Tournament

== Taekwondo ==
Tahiti has qualified 16 athletes.

Men

- Francois Mu - -54 kg, Team Tournament
- Paraita Brothers - -63 kg
- Kuaoleni Mercier - -74 kg
- Levan Tiaoa - Team Tournament
- Tutetoa Tchong - -58 kg
- Raihau Chin - -68 kg, Team Tournament
- Reynald Chan - -80 kg, Team Tournament
- Hamanatua Mu - 87 kg & Over

Women

- Audrey Vognin - -53 kg
- Raihau Tuaotaha - -62 kg
- Amaiterai Tetuanui
- Chaveta Sangue - -49 kg
- Yasmina Feuti - -57 kg
- Averii Gatien - -67 kg
- Anne-Caroline Graffe - 73 kg & Over
- Poenaki Roche

== Tennis ==
Tahiti has qualified 8 athletes.

Men

- Patrice Cotti
- Raiarii Yan
- Bruno Laitame
- Landry Lee-Tham
- Adrien Lee Tham Prevost

Women

- Ravahere Rauzy
- Catherine Yan
- Estelle Tehau

== Triathlon ==
Tahiti has qualified 5 athletes.

Men

- Alexandre Delattre - Mixed Team Sprint
- Romain Lambert - Mixed Team Sprint, Sprint
- Benjamin Zorgnotti

Women

- Manuella Heitz - Sprint, Mixed Team Sprint
- Jessica Levaux - Sprint

== Volleyball ==
=== Beach Volleyball ===
Tahiti has qualified a men's and women's team. Each team can consist of a maximum of 2 members.

Men - Team Tournament

- Dino Tauraa
- Vatea Tauraa

Women - Team Tournament

- Kahaialanie Layana Tauraa
- Ramata Temarii

=== Indoor Volleyball ===
Tahiti has qualified a men's and women's team. Each team can consist of a maximum of 12 members.

Men - Team Tournament

- Wilson Tuitete Bonno
- Vaianuu Mare
- Thierry Tearikinui Fauura
- Terii Steve Tauraa
- Marc Vaki
- Eric Kalsbeek
- Donavan Tahema Teavae
- Benjamin Leprado
- Edouard Mare
- Mauri Maono
- Davidson Rupea
- Jean-Yves Vaki

Women - Team Tournament

- Louisa Lokelani Vero
- Valeria Paofai Epse Vaki
- Matirita Stephanie Moua
- Yvette Vaea Paofai
- Moetu Temaui
- Gilda Mainanui Tavaearii
- Mathilda Teumere Paofai
- Rachele Hamau
- Teapua Zinguerlet
- Maimiti Patricia Mare
- Onyx Le Bihan
- Raurea Temarii

== Weightlifting ==
Tahiti has qualified 1 athletes.

Women

- Claudine Yu Hing - -53 kg Snatch, -53 kg Total, -53 kg Clean & Jerk

Men Roopinia Honoura Brandon
