= New Caledonia at the 2011 Pacific Games =

- Flags of New Caledonia
- IOC code: NCL

in Nouméa, New Caledonia 27 August 2011 – 10 September 2011
- Competitors
- Medals Ranked 1st: Gold 120 Silver 107 Bronze 61 Total 288

Pacific Games appearances
- 1963; 1966; 1969; 1971; 1975; 1979; 1983; 1987; 1991; 1995; 1999; 2003; 2007; 2011; 2015; 2019; 2023

New Caledonia competed at the 2011 Pacific Games in Nouméa, New Caledonia between 27 August and 10 September 2011 as host nation. As of 28 June 2011 New Caledonia has listed 747 competitors.

== Archery ==
New Caledonia has qualified 10 athletes.

Men

- Laurent Clerte
- Bruno Lau
- Henry Shiu
- Anthony Clerte
- Clement Bonneterre
- Gregoire Daniel

Women

- Emmanuelle Guihard
- Isabelle Dussol
- Isabelle Soero
- Sylvana Plazanet

== Athletics ==
New Caledonia has qualified 65 athletes.

Men

- David Alexandrine - 4 × 100 m Relay
- Alexandre Aubert
- Nordine Benfodda - 5000m, 10000m
- Paolo Biondo
- Max Boere
- Erwan Cassier - Hammer Throw
- Thierry Cibone - Shot Put Parasport Seated
- Marvin Delaunay-Belleville
- Frederic Erin - Long Jump, Triple Jump, 4 × 100 m Relay
- Henry Fakatika
- Xavier Fenuafanote - 110m Hurdles
- Lilian Garcon - Decathlon
- Rene Grail
- Jean-Bernard Harper - Pole Vault
- Jacky Hautaulu
- Olivier Hnassil
- Laurent Honore - Pole Vault
- Theo Houdret - 3000m Steeplechase
- Alain Jeremie
- Adrien Kela - 800m, 1500m
- Daniel Kilama
- Frederic Kiteau - Discus Throw
- Marc Koe
- Christopher Leroy - 110m Hurdles
- Audric Lucini - 5000m
- Christopher Makatuki
- Cedric Oblet - 1500m
- Georgy Outurau
- Kainric Ozoux - 100m, Triple Jump, 4 × 100 m Relay
- Thomas Prono - 10000m
- Eric Reuillard - Pole Vault, Decathlon
- Ogun Robert - High Jump
- Pasilione Tafilagi - Shot Put Parasport Seated
- Jean Pierre Talatini - Shot Put Parasport Seated
- Sebastien Tessarolo
- Tomasi Toto - Hammer Throw
- Eutesio Toto - Hammer Throw
- Patrick Vernay - Marathon
- Bertrand Vili - Discus Throw
- Thierry Washetine - Javelin Throw Parasport Ambulent
- Paul Zongo - 4 × 100 m Relay

Women

- Anne Beaufils - 5000m, 10000m
- Ifuja Chamoinri - 4 × 400 m Relay
- Marie-Xaviere Delesalle
- Leina Durand
- Erika Ellis - Marathon
- Losa Fakate
- Manuella Gavin - Triple Jump
- Odile Huan
- Mondy Laigle - Pole Vault, 4 × 400 m Relay
- Aimee Mailetoga - Shot Put
- Isabelle Oblet - 10000m, 3000m Steeplechase
- Peggy Paulmin - 4 × 400 m Relay
- Bina Ramesh - Discus Throw
- Franceska Sauvageot - 4 × 100 m Relay
- Linda Selui - Javelin Throw
- Elise Takosi - Hammer Throw
- Chloe Thavel
- Henricka Thomo - 4 × 100 m Relay
- Evelyne Tuitavake - Shot Put Parasport Seated
- Noemie Turaud
- Lucie Turpin - 100m Hurdles, Heptathlon, Long Jump
- Rose Vandegou - Shot Put Parasport Seated
- Phoebe Wejieme - 100m Hurdles, 4 × 100 m Relay, 4 × 400 m Relay
- Kamen Zongo - 4 × 100 m Relay

== Badminton ==
New Caledonia has qualified 9 athletes.

Men

- William Jannic - Mixed Double Tournament, Mixed Team Tournament, Single Tournament
- Marc-Antonie Desaymoz - Single Tournament, Mixed Team Tournament, Double Tournament, Mixed Double Tournament
- Fabien Kaddour - Double Tournament, Mixed Team Tournament
- Arnaud-Claude Franzi - Double Tournament, Mixed Team Tournament, Single Tournament
- Sebastien Arias - Mixed Team Tournament, Double Tournament

Women

- Cecile Kaddour - Double Tournament, Mixed Double Tournament, Mixed Team Tournament
- Johanne Kou - Double Tournament, Mixed Team Tournament, Mixed Double Tournament, Single Tournament
- Valerie Sarengat - Mixed Team Tournament, Single Tournament, Double Tournament
- Melissa Sanmoestanom - Double Tournament

== Baseball ==
New Caledonia has qualified a team. Each team can have a maximum of 20 athletes.

Men

- Jacques Boucheron
- Remi Couarraze
- David Durand
- Warren Guistel
- Christophe Jahja
- Jacques Levy
- Brieuc Mallet
- Bryan Roy
- Herve Saint-Pol
- James Selefen
- Kevin Velayoudon
- Boris Zavarsky
- Gabriel Bador
- Vincent Cassier
- Franck Chatchueng
- Sebastien Lepouriel
- Philippe Levy
- Matthieu Quinquis

== Basketball ==
New Caledonia has qualified a men's and women's team. Each team can consist of a maximum of 12 athletes

Men - Team Tournament

- Alexandre Ha-Ho
- Beniela Adjouhgniope
- Benjamin Hnawia
- Benoit Weber
- Emmanuel Soeria-Oumba
- Jean Jacques Taufana
- Jean-Christian Arnaud
- Laurent Berniere
- Raymond Weber
- Rodrigue Tetainanuarii
- Stephane Saminadin
- Yann Mathelon

Women - Team Tournament

- Alexandra Morin
- Audrey Guillou
- Christelle Vautrin
- Diana Moutry
- Dominique Armand
- Marie-Helene Trocas
- Myriam Fenuafanote
- Nathalie Gies
- Rachelle Kabar
- Wasselie Luepak
- Yolande Luepak
- Yolene Koteureu

== Bodybuilding ==
New Caledonia has qualified 11 athletes.

Men

- Taieb Brahim
- Guillaume Bruneau
- Philippe Carnicelli - -80 kg
- Roland Chodey
- Melvin Fichter
- Philippe Girard
- Steeve Martin
- Patrick Villemur

Women

- Glenda Girard
- Virginie Foucault - -55 kg, All Categories
- Stephanie Quach - 55 kg and Over

== Boxing ==
New Caledonia has qualified 7 athletes.

Men

- Jean Harper - -56 kg
- Gyan Athale
- Georges Waleku
- Luke Hema - -75 kg
- Nicolas Dion - -81 kg
- Nicolas Bastien - -91 kg
- Jean Vai Tuisamoa - 91 kg and Over

== Canoeing ==
New Caledonia has qualified 26 athletes.

Men

- Michel Anton - V6 500m, V12 500m
- Julien Katoa - V6 500m, V12 500m
- Jerry Mihimana - V6 500m, V6 30 km, V12 500m
- Georgy Taero - V6 500m, V12 500m
- Joseph Toi - V6 500m, V6 30 km, V12 500m
- Titouan Puyo - V1 500m, V1 15 km, V6 500m, V6 1500m, V12 500m
- Stephane Brunat - V6 1500m, V12 500m
- Yann Clavel - V6 1500m, V6 30 km, V12 500m
- Fabien Larhantec - V6 1500m, V6 30 km, V12 500m
- Cyril Pito - V6 1500m, V12 500m
- Frederic Tissot - V6 1500m, V12 500m
- Laurent Parotu - V12 500m
- Kevin Harbulot - V6 30 km
- Nicolas Mathieu - V6 30 km

Women

- Elise Akilitoa - V6 500m, V6 20 km, V12 500m
- Helene Christophe - V6 500m, V6 1500m, V12 500m
- Christelle Gouzennes - V6 500m, V6 1500m, V12 500m
- Diani Rabah - V6 500m, V6 1500m, V12 500m
- Yollande Teharuru - V6 500m, V6 1500m, V12 500m
- Lovaina Tetuira - V1 500m, V1 10 km, V6 500m, V6 1500m, V12 500m
- Moetuarii Manate - V6 1500m, V6 20 km, V12 500m
- Marcy Barbou - V6 20 km, V12 500m
- Isabelle Froud-Cornaille - V6 20 km, V12 500m
- Cindy Hons - V12 500m
- Sandrine Taerea - V6 20 km, V12 500m
- Claudine Teriinohorai - V6 20 km, V12 500m

== Cricket ==
New Caledonia has qualified a team. Each team can consist of a maximum of 15 athletes.

Men

- Falaone Fuimaono
- Yann Gastaldi
- Nasalio Gatuhau
- Emmanuel Katrawi
- Laurent Onocia
- Steeve Tchidopoane
- Jean-Christ Midraia
- Soane Folituu
- Johnatan Lapacas
- Noel Sinyeue
- Mikaele Tuakoifenua
- Wilfrid Fuimaono
- Kalepo Folituu
- Maletino Lagikula
- Vitolio Fomeku

== Football ==
New Caledonia has qualified a men's and women's team. Each team can consist of a maximum of 21 athletes.

Men - Team Tournament

- Jean Yann Dounezek
- Joel Wakanumune
- Kenji Vendegou
- Joris Gorendiawe
- Cesar Lolohea
- Dominique Wacelie
- Patrick Qaeze
- Marius Bako
- Iamel Kabeu
- Pierre Wajoka
- Bertrand Kai
- Michel Hmae
- Andre Sinedo
- Judikael Ixoee
- Jacques Haeko
- Rocky Nyikeine
- Georges Bearune
- Emile Bearune
- Georges Gope-Fenepej
- Dimitri Petemou
- Arsene Boawe
- Olivier Dokunengo
- Jean Patrick Wakanumune

Women - Team Tournament

- Beatrice Toluafe
- Glenda Jaine
- Marie Wanakaija
- Claire Kaemo
- Marielle Haocas
- Marilyse Lolo
- Helene Waengene
- Kamene Xowie
- Christelle Wahnawe
- Celine Xolawawa
- Stephanie Pahoa
- Cheyenne Dieuma
- Madeleine Jaine
- Audrey Sinem
- Brenda Kenon
- Marjorie Pouye
- Kim Maguire
- Aurelie Wahnapo
- Charlotte Pelletier
- Honorine Pouidja
- Elodie Teinpoawi
- Eva Wahio
- Aurelie Lalie

== Golf ==
New Caledonia has qualified 8 athletes.

Men

- Hugo Denis - Team Tournament, Individual Tournament
- Florian Gernier - Individual Tournament, Team Tournament
- Jean-Max Ho - Team Tournament
- Adrien Peres - Team Tournament, Individual Tournament

Women

- Mathilde Gloux Bauchet - Team Tournament
- Pricilla Gracia - Team Tournament
- Charlotte Navarro - Individual Tournament, Team Tournament
- Ophelie Rague - Team Tournament, Individual Tournament

== Judo ==
New Caledonia has qualified 23 athletes.

Men

- Paul Dulac
- Jean-Nicolas Faure
- Jonathan Berger
- Yohann Courtine
- Jean-Francois Durand
- Jerome Papai
- Cedric Do
- Cyril Chevalier
- Abedias Trindade de Abreu
- Larry Martin
- Teva Gouriou
- Anthony Tran
- Philippe Vautrin
- Stephane Courtine

Women

- Severine Raze
- Elodie Foeillet
- Emeline Kaddour
- Rosa Delots
- Anais Gopea
- Cyndi Rival
- Raissa Miko
- Vaea Chadfeau
- Erika Song

== Karate ==
New Caledonia has qualified 17 athletes.

Men

- Kevin Tuiseka - -67 kg
- Frederic Roumagne - 84 kg and Over, Team Kumite
- Minh Dack - Individual Kata
- Jean-Emmanuel Faure - -60 kg, Team Kata, Team Kumite
- Kevyn Pognon - -75 kg, Team Kata, Team Kumite
- Arnaud Saturnin - Team Kata
- Mathieu Annonier - -84 kg
- Jean-Christophe Taumotekava - Team Kumite, Open
- Jean-Paul Hmaloko - Team Kumite

Women

- Beatrice Ouassette - Team Kumite, -50 kg
- Emilie Brizard
- Alicia Bézier
- Sirani Sadimoen
- Germaine Ngaiohni - -68 kg
- Audrey Goddelin
- Morane Vacher - Team Kumite, Open
- Cindy Agamalu - Team Kumite

== Powerlifting ==
New Caledonia has qualified 8 athletes.

Men

- Karyl Le Van G'non - -66 kg
- Yannick Tuifua
- Fredo Lecren - -93 kg
- Thierry Siselo
- Soakimi Falevalu

Women

- Jacqueline Caco - -52 kg
- Stephanie Tiemonhou - -57 kg
- Lydie Tiemonhou - -63 kg

== Rugby Sevens ==
New Caledonia has qualified a men's and women's team. Each team can consist of a maximum of 12 athletes.

Men

- Joffrey Vaitanaki
- Desire Takatai
- Petelo Folautanoa
- Marcel Kauma
- Arnaud Abry
- Teva Legras
- Nicolas Pavlovski
- Malesio Maituku
- Freidy Totele
- Teddy Grondin
- Roy Wemama

Women

- Djemila Ihmanang
- Anne-Marie Waitreu
- Elisabete Keletaona
- Claire Hillaireau
- Marie-Helene Wahnawe
- Catherine Devillers
- Brenda Siwoine
- Yolaine Yengo
- Bianca Nekotrotro
- Wendy Mayat
- Dorothee Pakaina
- Victoire Homou

== Sailing ==
New Caledonia has qualified 8 athletes.

- Mathieu Frei - Laser Men Team, Laser Men
- Malo Leseigneur - Laser Men, Laser Men Team
- Gaela Marchal Piriou - Laser Women Team
- Priscilla Poaniewa - Laser Women Team, Laser Women
- Remy Desbordes - Mixed Hobie Cat, Mixed Hobie Cat Team
- Jerome Le Gal - Mixed Hobie Cat, Mixed Hobie Cat Team
- Titouan Galea - Mixed Hobie Cat Team
- Enrick Obert - Mixed Hobie Cat Team

== Shooting ==
New Caledonia has qualified 4 athletes.

- Yann Blanquet - Single Barrel Team
- Philippe Simoni - Single Barrel Individual, Point Score Team
- Theodore Tein Weiawe - Single Barrel Team, Point Score Team
- Warren Le Pironnec - Single Barrel Team, Point Score Individual, Point Score Team

== Squash ==
New Caledonia has qualified 10 athletes.

Men

- Nicolas Massenet - Team Tournament, Double Tournament
- Etienne Marziac - Double Tournament, Team Tournament
- Laurent Guepy - Single Tournament, Double Tournament, Team Tournament, Mixed Double Tournament
- Fabian Dinh - Mixed Double Tournament, Team Tournament, Double Tournament
- Julien Peraldi - Team Tournament

Women

- Christine Deneufbourg - Single Tournament, Team Tournament, Double Tournament
- Marie Pierre Leca - Team Tournament
- Cynthia Tahuhuterani - Team Tournament, Single Tournament, Double Tournament
- Sylvaine Durand - Double Tournament, Mixed Double Tournament, Team Tournament
- Vanessa Quach - Double Tournament, Team Tournament, Mixed Double Tournament, Single Tournament

== Surfing ==
New Caledonia has qualified 11 athletes.

Men

- Rémy Darkis - Mixed Longboard
- Antoine David
- Jordan David - Surf
- Rodrigue Kirsch
- Thierry Kirsch
- Martin N'Guyen
- Baptiste Rabut

Women

- Jenna Cinedrawa - Ondine
- Nathalie Cinedrawa
- Pauline Le Roux
- Julie Loudieres

== Swimming ==
New Caledonia has qualified 27 athletes.

Men

- Rudy Bernard
- Romain Berthaud - 4 × 200 m Freestyle Relay
- Thomas Chacun - 200m Butterfly, 50m Butterfly
- Thomas Dahlia - 50m Freestyle, 100m Freestyle, 200m Breaststroke, 200m IM, 4 × 100 m Freestyle Relay, 4 × 200 m Freestyle Relay, 4x100 Medley Relay, 200m Freestyle, 100m Breaststroke, 50m Breaststroke
- Julien-Pierre Goyetche - 4 × 100 m Freestyle Relay, 4x100 Medley Relay, 50m Backstroke, 100m Backstroke
- Jean-Baptiste L'Huillier
- Dylan Lavorel - 200m Backstroke, 4 × 100 m Medley Relay, 50m Backstroke, 100m Backstroke
- Marcus Meozzi
- Julien Monot
- Benoit Riviere
- Olivier Saminadin - 4 × 200 m Freestyle Relay, 400m Freestyle, 200m IM, 400m IM
- Bryan Spitz - 4 × 100 m Freestyle Relay
- David Thevenot - 4 × 100 m Freestyle Relay, 4x100 Medley Relay, 50m Butterfly, 100m Butterfly, 50m Freestyle, 100m Freestyle
- Damon Theveny - 5 km Open Water
- Hugo Tormento - 400m Freestyle, 1500m Freestyle, 200m Butterfly, 400m IM, 4 × 200 m Freestyle Relay, 5 km Open Water, 200m Backstroke, 200m Freestyle
- Jeremy Verlaguet - 1500m Freestyle

Women

- Suzanne Afchain - 4 × 100 m Freestyle Relay, 4 × 200 m Freestyle Relay, 200m Backstroke, 50m Backstroke
- Maroma Bong
- Dephine Bui Duyet - 400m IM, 100m Backstroke
- Diane Bui Duyet - 50m Butterfly, 100m Butterfly, 4 × 100 m Freestyle Relay, 4x100 Medley Relay
- Laurene Gosse - 200m Butterfly
- Lara Grangeon - 100m Freestyle, 200m Freestyle, 400m Freestyle, 800m Freestyle, 50m Backstroke, 100m Backstroke, 200m Backstroke, 100m Breaststroke, 200m Breaststroke, 200m Butterfly, 200m IM, 400m IM, 4 × 100 m Freestyle Relay, 4 × 200 m Freestyle Relay, 4 × 100 m Medley Relay, 5 km Open Water, 50m Breaststroke, 50m Butterfly, 100m Butterfly, 50m Freestyle
- Armelle Hidrio - 50m Freestyle, 4 × 100 m Freestyle Relay, 4 × 200 m Freestyle Relay, 4 × 100 m Medley Relay, 100m Freestyle, 200m IM
- Maeva Parayre
- Charlotte Robin - 4 × 200 m Freestyle Relay, 400m Freestyle, 800m Freestyle, 5 km Open Water
- Lauriane Santa
- Adeline Williams - 50m Breaststroke, 4 × 100 m Medley Relay, 100m Breaststroke, 200m Breaststroke

== Table Tennis ==
New Caledonia has qualified 10 athletes.

Men

- Olivier Bilon - Team Tournament
- Jeremy Dey - Team Tournament
- Stephane Gilabert - Double Tournament, Team Tournament
- Jeremy Lao - Team Tournament
- Laurent Sens - Double Tournament, Team Tournament, Single Tournament, Mixed Double Tournament

Women

- Ornella Bouteille - Double Tournament, Single Tournament, Team Tournament, Mixed Double Tournament
- Fleur Dumortier - Team Tournament, Single Tournament, Double Tournament
- Alexandra Heraclide - Single Tournament, Double Tournament, Team Tournament
- Fabianna Faehau - Team Tournament
- Lea Lai Van - Team Tournament, Double Tournament

== Taekwondo ==
New Caledonia has qualified 14 athletes.

Men

- Emerick Dubois - -54 kg, Team Tournament
- Vincent Roubio - -63 kg, Team Tournament
- Stephane Ouazana - -74 kg
- John Trouillet - Team Tournament, -87 kg
- Anthony Rondeau
- Axel Raymond - -68 kg
- Jeremy Wiard - -80 kg
- Karel Orthosie - Team Tournament, 87 kg & Over

Women

- Lindsay Gavin - -53 kg
- Meryl Monawa - -62 kg
- Alana Peraldi - -73 kg
- Jenny Dabin - -49 kg
- Lenka Folcher - -57 kg
- Doriane Gohe - -67 kg

== Tennis ==
New Caledonia has qualified 8 athletes.

Men

- Maxime Chazal - Mixed Double Tournament, Team Tournament, Double Tournament
- Nickolas N’Godrela - Single Tournament, Team Tournament, Double Tournament
- Loic Perret - Team Tournament
- Pierre-henri Guillaume - Team Tournament

Women

- Stephanie Di Luccio - Team Tournament
- Anaeve Pain - Mixed Double Tournament, Team Tournament, Single Tournament, Double Tournament
- Élodie Rogge - Single Tournament, Team Tournament, Double Tournament
- Meryl Pydo - Team Tournament

== Triathlon ==
New Caledonia has qualified 6 athletes.

Men

- Audric Lucini - Mixed Team Sprint, Sprint
- Thomas Testet
- Patrick Vernay - Sprint, Mixed Team Sprint

Women

- Erika Ellis
- Catherine Grangeon
- Sarah Laran - Mixed Team Sprint, Sprint

== Volleyball ==
=== Beach Volleyball ===
New Caledonia has qualified a men's and women's team. Each team can consist of a maximum of 2 members.

Men - Team Tournament

- Frantz Gouzenes
- Yvannick Iwa

Women - Team Tournament

- Sulita Malivao
- Sylvie Mero

=== Indoor Volleyball ===
New Caledonia has qualified a men's and women's team. Each team can consist of a maximum of 12 members.

Men

- Jean-Patrick Iwa
- Elysee Weneguei
- Francky Martin
- Franck Citre
- Jacques Xenihate
- Christopher Suve
- Marc Phadom
- Quincy Manuopuava
- Maoni Talia
- Morten Kalemhu
- Louis Totele
- Jacques Wainebengo

Women - Team Tournament

- Sonia Hoija
- Adele Menango
- Elisabeth Gope-Fenepej
- Cyrillia Atrea
- Germaine Manmieu
- Sarah Nehoune
- Moone Armonie Kohnu
- Aurelie Kohnu
- Emeline Haeko
- Rose Marie Vakie
- Esthera Wowene
- Alexia Wanabo

== Weightlifting ==
New Caledonia has qualified 2 athletes.

Women

- Stephanie Tiemonhou
- Lydie Tiemonhou - -63 kg Clean & Jerk, -63 kg Snatch, -63 kg Total

== Sources ==
- 2011 Pacific Games Medal Winners (PDF). Le Comité Territorial Olympique et Sportif de Nouvelle-Calédonie (Report). Archived (PDF) from the original on 25 June 2017.
