= Weightlifting at the 2011 Arafura Games =

- Dates: 10–13 May 2011
- Main venue: Darwin Entertainment Centre

Weightlifting at the 2011 Arafura Games took place at the Darwin Entertainment Centre between 10 and 13 May 2011.

Together with that year's Oceania Championships (which also include the South Pacific Championships), they were held concurrently as a single event designated the 2011 Arafura Games & Oceania Championships. Athletes from certain countries were able to contest multiple championships simultaneously (including age-group variants).

There were also two openweight para powerlifting events (one per gender) for disabled athletes.

== Medal summary ==
Results were as follows:

=== Medal table ===
* Host nation (Australia)

Rank	Nation	Gold	Silver	Bronze	Total
1	Australia*	3	5	2	10
2	Samoa	3	3	2	8
3	Papua New Guinea	2	2	3	7
4	Nauru	2	2	0	4
5	Thailand	2	1	2	5
6	China	1	1	0	2
7	Indonesia	1	0	3	4
8	Fiji	1	0	2	3
9	Kiribati	1	0	1	2
10	Mexico	1	0	0	1
11	Turkey	0	1	1	2
12	Micronesia	0	1	0	1
12	New Zealand	0	1	0	1
14	Niue	0	0	1	1
Totals (14 entries)		17	17	17	51

=== Men ===
Event	Gold		Silver		Bronze	
56 kg	Manueli Tulo; Fiji	218 kg	Elson Brechtefield; Nauru	217 kg	Danu Sputra Bagus; Indonesia	207 kg
62 kg	Zhongshuang Wu; China	259 kg	Manuel Minginfel; Micronesia	254 kg	Vannara Be; Australia	253 kg
69 kg	Takenibeia Toromon; Kiribati	265 kg	Bob Pesaleli; Samoa	235 kg	Nazarudin; Indonesia	233 kg
77 kg	Yukio Peter; Nauru	347 kg	Mathew Madsen; New Zealand	252 kg	Steve McConnell; Australia	240 kg
85 kg	Steven Kari; Papua New Guinea	312 kg	Ben Turner; Australia	290 kg	Banyat Tawnok; Thailand	289 kg
94 kg	Simplice Ribouem; Australia	334 kg	Faavae Faauliuli; Samoa	320 kg	David Katoatau; Kiribati	315 kg
105 kg	Niusila Opeloge; Samoa	321 kg	Robert Galsworthy; Australia	320 kg	Tovia Opeloge; Samoa	312 kg
+105 kg	Itte Detenamo; Nauru	413 kg	Damon Kelly; Australia	375 kg	Daniel Nemani; Niue	320 kg

=== Women ===
Event	Gold		Silver		Bronze	
48 kg	Sari Ully; Indonesia	150 kg	Vivian Lee; Australia	141 kg	Kathleen Hare; Papua New Guinea	133 kg
53 kg	Socheata Be; Australia	149 kg	Hitolo Dogodo; Papua New Guinea	133 kg	Gloria Kimbu; Papua New Guinea	128 kg
58 kg	Seen Lee; Australia	176 kg	Erika Yamasaki; Australia	173 kg	Maria Liku; Fiji	152 kg
63 kg	Rita Kari; Papua New Guinea	178 kg	Faitoga Togagae; Samoa	163 kg	Dwi Mayassah Lestari; Indonesia	162 kg
69 kg	Yupawan Klankhlaw; Thailand	211 kg	Guba Hale; Papua New Guinea	172 kg	Apolonia Vaivai; Fiji	156 kg
75 kg	Mary Opeloge; Samoa	214 kg	Michaela Detenamo; Nauru	206 kg	Sandra Ako; Papua New Guinea	150 kg
+75 kg	Ele Opeloge; Samoa	275 kg	Chen Yingyi; China	211 kg	Iuniarra Simanu; Samoa	203 kg

=== Para powerlifting ===
Event	Gold		Silver		Bronze	
Men	Narong Kasanun; Thailand	191.776 pts	Choochat Sukjarern; Thailand	185.433 pts	Thongsa Marasri; Thailand	182.601 pts
Women	Amalia Pérez; Mexico	128.016 pts	Nazmiye Muslu Muratlı; Turkey	112.173 pts	Özlem Becerikli; Turkey	108.121 pts
