= 2011 Oceania Weightlifting Championships =

International weightlifting competition

- Host city: Darwin, Australia
- Dates: 11–13 May 2011
- Main venue: Darwin Entertainment Centre

The 2011 Oceania Weightlifting Championships took place at the Darwin Entertainment Centre in Darwin, Australia from 11 to 13 May 2011.

Together with that year's Arafura Games weightlifting competition, they were held concurrently as a single event designated the 2011 Arafura Games & Oceania Championships. Athletes from certain countries were able to contest multiple championships simultaneously (including age-group variants).

== Medal summary ==
Note that the results shown below are for the senior competition only. Junior and youth results are cited here and here respectively.

=== Medal table ===
* Host nation (Australia)

Rank	Nation	Gold	Silver	Bronze	Total
1	Australia*	4	5	1	10
2	Samoa	3	4	2	9
3	Papua New Guinea	3	2	5	10
4	Nauru	2	2	0	4
5	Fiji	1	1	1	3
6	Kiribati	1	0	1	2
7	Federated States of Micronesia	1	0	0	1
8	New Zealand	0	1	1	2
9	Niue	0	0	1	1
9	Tuvalu	0	0	1	1
Totals (10 entries)		15	15	13	43

=== Men ===
Event	Gold		Silver		Bronze	
56 kg	Manueli Tulo; Fiji	218 kg	Elson Brechtefield; Nauru	217 kg	Cameron Moss; New Zealand	108 kg
62 kg	Manuel Minginfel; Federated States of Micronesia	254 kg	Vannara Be; Australia	253 kg	Tuau Lapua Lapua; Tuvalu	230 kg
69 kg	Takenibeia Toromon; Kiribati	265 kg	Bob Pesaleli; Samoa	235 kg	Toua Udia; Papua New Guinea	225 kg
77 kg	Yukio Peter; Nauru	347 kg	Mathew Madsen; New Zealand	252 kg	Heni Udu; Papua New Guinea	180 kg
85 kg	Steven Kari; Papua New Guinea	312 kg	Ben Turner; Australia	290 kg	Jonathan Yoshida; Samoa	270 kg
94 kg	Simplice Ribouem; Australia	334 kg	Faavae Faauliuli; Samoa	320 kg	David Katoatau; Kiribati	315 kg
105 kg	Niusila Opeloge; Samoa	321 kg	Robert Galsworthy; Australia	320 kg	Tovia Opeloge; Samoa	312 kg
+105 kg	Itte Detenamo; Nauru	413 kg	Damon Kelly; Australia	375 kg	Daniel Nemani; Niue	320 kg

=== Women ===
Event	Gold		Silver		Bronze	
48 kg	Vivian Lee; Australia	141 kg	Kathleen Hare; Papua New Guinea	133 kg	Not awarded (lack of entries)	
53 kg	Socheata Be; Australia	149 kg	Hitolo Dogodo; Papua New Guinea	133 kg	Not awarded (lack of entries)	
58 kg	Seen Lee; Australia	176 kg	Erika Yamasaki; Australia	173 kg	Maria Liku; Fiji	152 kg
63 kg	Rita Kare; Papua New Guinea	178 kg	Faitoga Togagae; Samoa	163 kg	Tau Daure; Papua New Guinea	86 kg
69 kg	Guba Hale; Papua New Guinea	172 kg	Apolonia Vaivai; Fiji	156 kg	Michelle Kahi; Australia	150 kg
75 kg	Mary Opeloge; Samoa	214 kg	Michaela Detenamo; Nauru	206 kg	Sandra Ako; Papua New Guinea	150 kg
+75 kg	Ele Opeloge; Samoa	275 kg	Iuniarra Simanu; Samoa	203 kg	Lorraine Harry; Papua New Guinea	125 kg
