= Weightlifting at the 2011 Pacific Games =

- Location: Nouméa, New Caledonia
- Dates: 5–7 September 2011

Weightlifting at the 2011 Pacific Games in Nouméa, New Caledonia was held on September 5–7, 2011.

== Medal summary ==
=== Medal table ===
Ranking by Big (Total result) medals

* Host nation (New Caledonia)

Rank	Nation	Gold	Silver	Bronze	Total
1	Papua New Guinea	5	1	3	9
2	Samoa	4	1	2	7
3	Fiji	2	2	2	6
4	Nauru	2	1	2	5
5	Micronesia	1	1	0	2
6	Tonga	1	0	1	2
7	Kiribati	0	2	2	4
8	Solomon Islands	0	2	0	2
9	Niue	0	1	1	2
10	Cook Islands	0	1	0	1
10	French Polynesia	0	1	0	1
10	New Caledonia*	0	1	0	1
10	Tuvalu	0	1	0	1
14	Palau	0	0	1	1
Totals (14 entries)		15	15	14	44

Ranking by all medals: Big (Total result) and Small (Snatch and Clean & Jerk)

* Host nation (New Caledonia)

Rank	Nation	Gold	Silver	Bronze	Total
1	Papua New Guinea	14	3	10	27
2	Samoa	13	4	7	24
3	Fiji	7	4	7	18
4	Nauru	6	5	3	14
5	Micronesia	3	2	1	6
6	Kiribati	1	6	5	12
7	Tonga	1	2	2	5
8	Solomon Islands	0	5	1	6
9	Niue	0	3	3	6
10	Cook Islands	0	3	0	3
10	New Caledonia*	0	3	0	3
12	French Polynesia	0	2	1	3
12	Tuvalu	0	2	1	3
14	Palau	0	1	2	3
Totals (14 entries)		45	45	43	133

=== Men ===
Event	Gold		Silver		Bronze		Refs
−56 kg Snatch	Manueli Tulo; Fiji	105 kg	Brechtefeld Elson; Nauru	95 kg	Morea Baru; Papua New Guinea	95 kg	
−56 kg Clean & Jerk	Manueli Tulo; Fiji	126 kg	Morea Baru; Papua New Guinea	125 kg	Brechtefeld Elson; Nauru	120 kg	
−56 kg Total	Manueli Tulo; Fiji	231 kg	Morea Baru; Papua New Guinea	220 kg	Brechtefeld Elson; Nauru	215 kg	
−62 kg Snatch	Manuel Minginfel; Federated States of Micronesia	115 kg	Tuau Lapua Lapua; Tuvalu	105 kg	Stevick Patris; Palau	102 kg	
−62 kg Clean & Jerk	Manuel Minginfel; Federated States of Micronesia	150 kg	Stevick Patris; Palau	131 kg	Tuau Lapua Lapua; Tuvalu	131 kg	
−62 kg Total	Manuel Minginfel; Federated States of Micronesia	265 kg	Tuau Lapua Lapua; Tuvalu	236 kg	Stevick Patris; Palau	233 kg	
−69 kg Snatch	Bronco Deiranauw; Nauru	116 kg	Toafitu Perive; Samoa	110 kg	Toua Udia; Papua New Guinea	105 kg	
−69 kg Clean & Jerk	Toafitu Perive; Samoa	154 kg	Bronco Deiranauw; Nauru	153 kg	Toua Udia; Papua New Guinea	140 kg	
−69 kg Total	Bronco Deiranauw; Nauru	269 kg	Toafitu Perive; Samoa	264 kg	Toua Udia; Papua New Guinea	245 kg	
−77 kg Snatch	Toromon Takenibeia; Kiribati	121 kg	Finau Ilaniume; Tonga	120 kg	Taqua Paula Peniasi; Fiji	118 kg	
−77 kg Clean & Jerk	Taqua Paula Peniasi; Fiji	153 kg	Finau Ilaniume; Tonga	152 kg	Toromon Takenibeia; Kiribati	148 kg	
−77 kg Total	Finau Ilaniume; Tonga	272 kg	Taqua Paula Peniasi; Fiji	271 kg	Toromon Takenibeia; Kiribati	269 kg	
−85 kg Snatch	Steven Kari; Papua New Guinea	140 kg	Uati Maposua; Samoa	125 kg	Josefa Aketini Vueti; Fiji	121 kg	
−85 kg Clean & Jerk	Steven Kari; Papua New Guinea	181 kg	Josefa Aketini Vueti; Fiji	157 kg	Petunu Opeloge; Samoa	155 kg	
−85 kg Total	Steven Kari; Papua New Guinea	321 kg	Josefa Aketini Vueti; Fiji	278 kg	Val-John Starr; Nauru	271 kg	
−94 kg Snatch	Faavae Faauliuli; Samoa	140 kg	David Katoatau; Kiribati	136 kg	Teatua Tito; Kiribati	115 kg	
−94 kg Clean & Jerk	Faavae Faauliuli; Samoa	192 kg	David Katoatau; Kiribati	192 kg	Teatua Tito; Kiribati	160 kg	
−94 kg Total	Faavae Faauliuli; Samoa	332 kg	David Katoatau; Kiribati	328 kg	Teatua Tito; Kiribati	275 kg	
−105 kg Snatch	Niusila Opeloge; Samoa	152 kg	Meamea Thomas; Kiribati	145 kg	Tovia Opeloge; Samoa	130 kg	
−105 kg Clean & Jerk	Niusila Opeloge; Samoa	194 kg	Meamea Thomas; Kiribati	190 kg	Tovia Opeloge; Samoa	170 kg	
−105 kg Total	Niusila Opeloge; Samoa	346 kg	Meamea Thomas; Kiribati	335 kg	Tovia Opeloge; Samoa	300 kg	
+105 kg Snatch	Itte Detenamo; Nauru	172 kg	Samuel Junior Pera; Cook Islands	160 kg	Daniel Nemani; Niue	142 kg	
+105 kg Clean & Jerk	Itte Detenamo; Nauru	208 kg	Samuel Junior Pera; Cook Islands	190 kg	Daniel Nemani; Niue	175 kg	
+105 kg Total	Itte Detenamo; Nauru	380 kg	Samuel Junior Pera; Cook Islands	350 kg	Daniel Nemani; Niue	317 kg	

=== Women ===
Event	Gold		Silver		Bronze	
–48 kg Snatch	Suzanne Hiram; Nauru	66 kg	Kathleen Hare; Papua New Guinea	65 kg	Seruwaia Malani; Federated States of Micronesia	40 kg
–48 kg Clean & Jerk	Kathleen Hare; Papua New Guinea	83 kg	Seruwaia Malani; Federated States of Micronesia	58 kg	Not awarded	
–48 kg Total	Kathleen Hare; Papua New Guinea	148 kg	Seruwaia Malani; Federated States of Micronesia	98 kg	Not awarded	
−53 kg Snatch	Dika Toua; Papua New Guinea	65 kg	Claudine Yu Hing; Tahiti	50 kg	Arieta Mudunavoce; Fiji	45 kg
−53 kg Clean & Jerk	Dika Toua; Papua New Guinea	85 kg	Arieta Mudunavoce; Fiji	60 kg	Claudine Yu Hing; Tahiti	60 kg
−53 kg Total	Dika Toua; Papua New Guinea	150 kg	Claudine Yu Hing; Tahiti	110 kg	Arieta Mudunavoce; Fiji	105 kg
−58 kg Snatch	Maria Liku; Fiji	78 kg	Jenly Tegu Wini; Solomon Islands	75 kg	Monalisa Kassman; Papua New Guinea	56 kg
−58 kg Clean & Jerk	Maria Liku; Fiji	98 kg	Jenly Tegu Wini; Solomon Islands	97 kg	Monalisa Kassman; Papua New Guinea	73 kg
−58 kg Total	Maria Liku; Fiji	176 kg	Jenly Tegu Wini; Solomon Islands	172 kg	Monalisa Kassman; Papua New Guinea	129 kg
−63 kg Snatch	Rita Kari; Papua New Guinea	75 kg	Lydie Tiemonhou; New Caledonia	65 kg	Tuipulotu Fakaola; Tonga	62 kg
−63 kg Clean & Jerk	Rita Kari; Papua New Guinea	90 kg	Lydie Tiemonhou; New Caledonia	77 kg	Julia Timi; Fiji	76 kg
−63 kg Total	Rita Kari; Papua New Guinea	165 kg	Lydie Tiemonhou; New Caledonia	142 kg	Tuipulotu Fakaola; Tonga	137 kg
−69 kg Snatch	Guba Hale; Papua New Guinea	81 kg	Hapilyn Iro; Solomon Islands	79 kg	Apolonia Vaivai; Fiji	79 kg
−69 kg Clean & Jerk	Guba Hale; Papua New Guinea	100 kg	Vanissa Lui; Samoa	100 kg	Hapilyn Iro; Solomon Islands	99 kg
−69 kg Total	Guba Hale; Papua New Guinea	181 kg	Hapilyn Iro; Solomon Islands	178 kg	Apolonia Vaivai; Fiji	177 kg
−75 kg Snatch	Mary Opeloge; Samoa	101 kg	Michaela Detenamo; Nauru	93 kg	Sandra Ako; Papua New Guinea	70 kg
−75 kg Clean & Jerk	Mary Opeloge; Samoa	120 kg	Michaela Detenamo; Nauru	117 kg	Sandra Ako; Papua New Guinea	85 kg
−75 kg Total	Mary Opeloge; Samoa	221 kg	Michaela Detenamo; Nauru	210 kg	Sandra Ako; Papua New Guinea	155 kg
+75 kg Snatch	Ele Opeloge; Samoa	120 kg	Narita Viliamu; Niue	90 kg	Iuniarra Simanu; Samoa	87 kg
+75 kg Clean & Jerk	Ele Opeloge; Samoa	161 kg	Narita Viliamu; Niue	120 kg	Iuniarra Simanu; Samoa	112 kg
+75 kg Total	Ele Opeloge; Samoa	281 kg	Narita Viliamu; Niue	210 kg	Iuniarra Simanu; Samoa	199 kg

== See also ==
- Weightlifting at the Pacific Games
