= Opeloge =

Opeloge is a surname. Notable people with the surname include:

- Avatu Opeloge (born ~2005), Samoan weightlifter
- Don Opeloge (born 1999), Samoan weightlifter
- Ele Opeloge (born 1985), Samoan weightlifter
- Jack Opeloge, Samoan weightlifter
- Mary Opeloge (born 1992), Samoan weightlifter
- Niusila Opeloge (born 1980), Samoan weightlifter
- Petunu Opeloge (born 1994), Samoan weightlifter
- Tovia Opeloge (born 1990), Samoan weightlifter
