= 2012 Commonwealth Weightlifting Championships =

- Host city: Apia, Samoa
- Dates: 6–9 June 2012
- Main venue: Faleata Sports Complex

The 2012 Commonwealth Weightlifting Championships took place at the Faleata Sports Complex in Apia, Samoa from 6 to 9 June 2012. Together with that year's Oceania Championships, they were held concurrently as a single event designated the 2012 Oceania & Commonwealth Weightlifting Championships.

== Medal summary ==
Results shown below are for the senior competition only. Junior and youth results are cited here and here respectively.

=== Medal table ===
* Host nation (Samoa)

Rank	Nation	Gold	Silver	Bronze	Total
1	India	9	4	2	15
2	Samoa*	2	1	3	6
3	Australia	1	2	4	7
4	Papua New Guinea	1	2	1	4
5	Kiribati	1	2	0	3
6	New Zealand	1	0	2	3
7	Nauru	0	2	0	2
8	Canada	0	1	1	2
8	Solomon Islands	0	1	1	2
Totals (9 entries)		15	15	14	44

=== Men ===
Event	Gold		Silver		Bronze	
56 kg	Ranjit Chinchwade; India	224 kg	Elson Brechtefeld; Nauru	217 kg	Fred Oala; Papua New Guinea	188 kg
62 kg	Rustam Sarang; India	260 kg	Dilli Senthamizh Selvan; India	251 kg	Daniel Koum; Australia	250 kg
69 kg	Namechand Sunil Kumar; India	278 kg	Takenibeia Toromon; Kiribati	267 kg	Vester Villalon; New Zealand	237 kg
77 kg	Sathish Sivalingam; India	297 kg	Toafitu Perive; Samoa	288 kg	Ben Turner; Australia	282 kg
85 kg	Richie Patterson; New Zealand	334 kg	Steven Kari; Papua New Guinea	324 kg	Paul Dumais; Canada	320 kg
94 kg	David Katoatau; Kiribati	330 kg	Chandrakant Dadu Mali; India	329 kg	Chris Ciancio; Australia	300 kg
105 kg	Mohanlal Shyamlal; India	339 kg	Meamea Thomas; Kiribati	330 kg	Tovia Opeloge; Samoa	317 kg
+105 kg	Damon Kelly; Australia	390 kg	Itte Detenamo; Nauru	380 kg	Victor Abilash; India	323 kg

=== Women ===
Event	Gold		Silver		Bronze	
48 kg	Khumukcham Sanjita Chanu; India	154 kg	Kathleen Hare; Papua New Guinea	135 kg	Not awarded (lack of entries)	
53 kg	Dika Toua; Papua New Guinea	182 kg	Tikina Gopal; India	162 kg	Katila Venkata Lakshmi; India	151 kg
58 kg	Minati Sethi; India	175 kg	Sumanbala Devi; India	166 kg	Jenly Tegu Wini; Solomon Islands	161 kg
63 kg	Rajwant Kaur; India	172 kg	Hapilyn Iro; Solomon Islands	164 kg	Melissa Robinson; Australia	155 kg
69 kg	Monika Devi; India	207 kg	Marie-Josée Arès-Pilon; Canada	201 kg	Tauimani Ah Kuoi; Samoa	183 kg
75 kg	Mary Opeloge; Samoa	223 kg	Jenna Myers; Australia	211 kg	Chantal Lambrech; New Zealand	175 kg
+75 kg	Ele Opeloge; Samoa	264 kg	Deborah Acason; Australia	223 kg	Iuniarra Simanu; Samoa	221 kg
