= Manueli Tulo =

Fijian weightlifter

Personal information
- Born: March 25, 1990 (age 36) Levuka
- Height: 1.51 m (4 ft 11 1/2 in)
- Weight: 56 kg (123 lb)

Sport
- Country: Fiji
- Sport: Weightlifting
- Event: 56kg
Medal record
Men's Weightlifting
Representing Fiji
Pacific Games
Gold medal – first place	2011 Nouméa	56 kg
Gold medal – first place	2015 Port Moresby	56 kg
Bronze medal – third place	2007 Apia	56 kg
Commonwealth Championships
Bronze medal – third place	2016 Penang	56 kg
Oceania Championships
Gold medal – first place	2009 Darwin	56 kg
Gold medal – first place	2010 Suva	56 kg
Gold medal – first place	2011 Darwin	56 kg
Gold medal – first place	2012 Apia	56 kg
Gold medal – first place	2014 Le Mont-Dore	56 kg
Gold medal – first place	2015 Port Moresby	56 kg
Gold medal – first place	2016 Suva	56 kg
Gold medal – first place	2017 Gold Coast	56 kg
Arafura Games
Gold medal – first place	2009 Darwin	56 kg
Gold medal – first place	2011 Darwin	56 kg
- Updated on 28 January 2022

Manueli Tulo (born 25 March 1990) is a Fijian weightlifter who competed for Fiji at the 2012 Summer Olympics and at the 2016 Summer Olympics. Both times he competed in the Men's 56kg event, finishing 13th both times. His wife Maria Liku also represented Fiji in weightlifting at the 2012 Summer Olympics, while his younger sister, Seruwaia Malani, competed at the 2014 Commonwealth Games.

== Career ==
In 2009, he won the 2008 Fiji Sportsman of the Year award, having won Fiji's first gold medal at the Commonwealth Youth Games in 2008. Also in 2009, he finished 4th at the Commonwealth Championship.

He came 3rd in the 2016 Commonwealth Championship, after finishing 5th in the 2015 edition.

Tulo won a gold medal at the 2016 Oceania Weightlifting Championships. He also won a gold medal at the Australian Open Championships when he snatched 108 kg, clean and jerked 134 kg for a total of 242 kg. That year he finished 5th in the Commonwealth Championships.

Tulo finished 8th at the 2017 World Championships, with a total of 238 kg (103 kg snatch, 135 kg clean & jerk). This was a great improvement over his previous World Championship finishes of 21st, 22nd and 26th (in 2011, 2015 and 2010 respectively).

At the 2018 Commonwealth Games, he finished 4th, with a total of 239 kg (104 kg snatch, 135 kg clean & jerk).
