= Boxing at the 2011 Pacific Games =

Boxing at the 2011 Pacific Games in Nouméa, New Caledonia was held on August 30–September 3, 2011. Only men's competition was held, with ten weight divisions contested.

== Medal summary ==
=== Medal table ===
Rank	Nation	Gold	Silver	Bronze	Total
1	French Polynesia (TAH)	4	2	1	7
2	Papua New Guinea	2	1	3	6
3	New Caledonia	2	1	1	4
4	Nauru	1	3	3	7
5	Samoa	1	1	3	5
6	Vanuatu	0	1	2	3
7	Fiji	0	1	0	1
8	Solomon Islands	0	0	2	2
8	Tonga	0	0	2	2
10	Cook Islands	0	0	1	1
10	Kiribati	0	0	1	1
Totals (11 entries)		10	10	19	39

=== Results ===
Event	Gold	Silver	Bronze
49 kg	Jack Willie; Papua New Guinea	Jean Leonce Nauka; Vanuatu	Paul Kava; Solomon Islands (only one bronze medallist)
52 kg	Kanku Raka Junior; Papua New Guinea	Hoani Marescot; Tahiti	Blanco Wharton; Nauru; Alosio Arabatu; Solomon Islands
56 kg	Jayson Marunui Tuihaa; Tahiti	Andrew Opugu; Papua New Guinea	Jean Harper; New Caledonia; Mosese Pousoo; Samoa
60 kg	Karihi Tehei; Tahiti	Colan Caleb; Nauru	Daniel Iata; Vanuatu; Tom Boga; Papua New Guinea
64 kg	Jean-Louis Ariihau Albertini; Tahiti	Jese Ravudi; Fiji	Livai Hinoma; Samoa; Noel Eko Aisa; Papua New Guinea
69 kg	Albert Temaititahio; Tahiti	Joseph Deireragea; Nauru	Fred Moia; Vanuatu; Henry Tyrell; Samoa
75 kg	Petelo Matagi; Samoa	Santana Halstead; Nauru	Etu Iorangi; Cook Islands; Santana Halstead; Nauru
81 kg	Nicolas Dion; New Caledonia	Filimaua Hala; Samoa	Tony Toliman; Papua New Guinea; Sosefo Kauatoa Falekaono; Tonga
91 kg	Nicolas Bastien; New Caledonia	Richardet Mahanora; Tahiti	Tridence Duburiya; Nauru; Tarieta Ruata; Kiribati
+91 kg	Jake Ageidu; Nauru	Jean Vaï Tuisamoa; New Caledonia	Semisi Kalu; Tonga; Alosio Arabatu; Tahiti

== See also ==
- Boxing at the Pacific Games
