= V1 500m at the 2011 Pacific Games =

The V1 500 metre sprint event within the Outrigger canoeing competition at the 2011 Pacific Games was won by Hans Paieamo of French Polynesia.

== Heats ==
The V1 500 meter heat occurred on 30 August with two heats and a repechage.

Rank	Heats	Name	Nationality	Time	Notes
1	1	Hans Paieamo	French Polynesia	2:15.01	Q
2	1	Titouan Puyo	New Caledonia	2:18.31	Q
3	1	Mark Williams	Samoa	2:24.21	
1	2	Jacky Joe Tuakoifenua	Wallis and Futuna	2:24.34	Q
2	2	George Andre Tutaka	Cook Islands	2:26.21	Q
4	1	Dylan Edwards	Fiji	2:30.39	
5	1	Carl Aguon Jr	Guam	2:31.14	
3	2	Ronnie Hae	Papua New Guinea	2:37.09	
4	2	O'Quinn Sakuma	Palau	2:47.15	

=== Repechage ===
Rank	Name	Nationality	Time	Notes
1	Mark Williams	Samoa	2:22.42	
2	Dylan Edwards	Fiji	2:25.23	
3	O'Quinn Sakuma	Palau	2:39.06	
4	Carl Aguon Jr	Guam	DSQ	
5	Ronnie Hae	Papua New Guinea	DSQ	

== Final ==
The final occurred on 30 August with 6 competitors from 6 countries.

Rank	Name	Nationality	Time	Notes
1	Hans Paieamo	French Polynesia	2:15.18	
2	Titouan Puyo	New Caledonia	2:17.36	
3	Jacky Joe Tuakoifenua	Wallis and Futuna	2:20.39	
4	George Andre Tutaka	Cook Islands	2:22.08	
5	Mark Williams	Samoa	2:24.25	
6	Dylan Edwards	Fiji	2:30.01	

== Sources ==
- 2011 Pacific Games Results. Oceania Sport Information Centre (Report). p. 32-33. Archived from the original on 31 October 2015.
