= Mary Opeloge =

Samoan weightlifter (born 1992)

Personal information
- Nationality: Samoan
- Born: 24 January 1992 (age 34) Motoʻotua, Samoa
- Height: 1.52 m (5 ft 0 in)
- Weight: 75 kg (165 lb)

Sport
- Sport: Weightlifting
- Event: 75 kg
Medal record
Representing Samoa
Women's weightlifting
Commonwealth Games
Silver medal – second place	2014 Glasgow	75 kg
Pacific Games
Gold medal – first place	2011 Nouméa	75 kg
Gold medal – first place	2015 Port Moresby	75 kg
Commonwealth Championships
Gold medal – first place	2012 Apia	75 kg
Gold medal – first place	2013 Penang	75 kg
Gold medal – first place	2015 Pune	75 kg
Oceania Championships
Gold medal – first place	2008 Auckland	75 kg
Gold medal – first place	2009 Darwin	75 kg
Gold medal – first place	2010 Suva	75 kg
Gold medal – first place	2011 Darwin	75 kg
Gold medal – first place	2012 Apia	75 kg
Gold medal – first place	2013 Brisbane	75 kg
Gold medal – first place	2014 Le Mont-Dore	75 kg
Gold medal – first place	2015 Port Moresby	75 kg
Gold medal – first place	2016 Suva	75 kg
Arafura Games
Gold medal – first place	2009 Darwin	75 kg
Gold medal – first place	2011 Darwin	75 kg
- Updated on 30 January 2022

Mary Opeloge (born 24 January 1992) is a Samoan weightlifter. She competed in the women's 75 kg event at the 2014 Commonwealth Games where she won a silver medal. She won Gold at the 2016 Oceania Weightlifting Championships.

She competed at the 2016 Summer Olympics in Rio de Janeiro. She finished in 11th place in the women's 75 kg event. She was the flagbearer for Samoa during the opening ceremony.

== Personal life ==
Mary is the younger sister of Ele & Niusila Opeloge who are Commonwealth Gold medalists. She also has two other brothers who are also weightlifters.
