= Toafitu Perive =

Samoan weightlifter (born 1985)

Personal information
- Born: January 7, 1985 (age 41)
- Height: 1.73 m (5 ft 8 in)
- Weight: 76 kg (168 lb)

Sport
- Country: Samoa
- Sport: Weightlifting
- Event: 77kg
- Coached by: Tuaopepe Jerry Wallwork
Medal record
Men's weightlifting
Representing Samoa
Pacific Games
Silver medal – second place	2011 Nouméa	69 kg
Commonwealth Championships
Silver medal – second place	2012 Apia	77 kg
Oceania Championships
Gold medal – first place	2012 Apia	77 kg
Silver medal – second place	2013 Brisbane	77 kg
Silver medal – second place	2014 Le Mont-Dore	77 kg
Bronze medal – third place	2009 Darwin (Note: Arafura Games also)	77 kg
Bronze medal – third place	2016 Suva	77 kg
- Updated on 30 January 2022

Toafitu Perive (born 7 January 1985) is a Samoan weightlifter competing in the 77 kg category. He competed at the 2012 Summer Olympics finishing in eleventh place.

Medalbox note
