= Weightlifting at the 2010 Commonwealth Games – Women's 48 kg =

The Women's 48 kg weightlifting event was the lightest women's event at the competition, limiting competitors to a maximum of 48 kilograms of body mass. Nigerian Augustina Nwaokolo won the first gold medal of the Games, setting a new Games record of 175 kg after lifting 77 kg in the snatch and 98 kg in the clean and jerk.

== Athletes ==
10 lifters were selected for the games.

	Athlete	Year of birth
1	Vivian Lee (AUS)	1978
2	Erika Yamasaki (AUS)	1987
3	Molla Shabira (BAN)	1990
4	Sandyha Atom (IND)	1980
5	Sonya Chanu (IND)	1980
6	Zaira Zakaria (MAS)	1987
7	Augustina Nwaokolo (NGR)	1992
8	Kathleen Hare (PNG)	1988
9	Kathsia Telemaque (SEY)	1989
10	Portia Vries (RSA)	1984

== Results ==
Rank	Name	Country	B.weight (kg)	Snatch (kg)	Clean & Jerk (kg)	Total (kg)
1st place, gold medalist(s)	Augustina Nwaokolo	Nigeria	47.32	77	98	175 GR
2nd place, silver medalist(s)	Sonya Chanu	India	47.71	73	94	167
3rd place, bronze medalist(s)	Sandyha Atom	India	47.73	70	95	165
4	Zaira Zakaria	Malaysia	47.95	75	90	165
5	Vivian Lee	Australia	47.66	69	91	160
6	Portia Vries	South Africa	47.36	66	90	156
7	Kathleen Hare	Papua New Guinea	46.80	64	83	147
8	Kathsia Telemaque	Seychelles	47.94	65	80	145
9	Molla Shabira	Bangladesh	47.69	66	75	141
–	Erika Yamasaki	Australia	47.90	73	–	DNF

== See also ==
- 2010 Commonwealth Games
- Weightlifting at the 2010 Commonwealth Games
