= Seen Lee =

Australian weightlifter (born 1982)

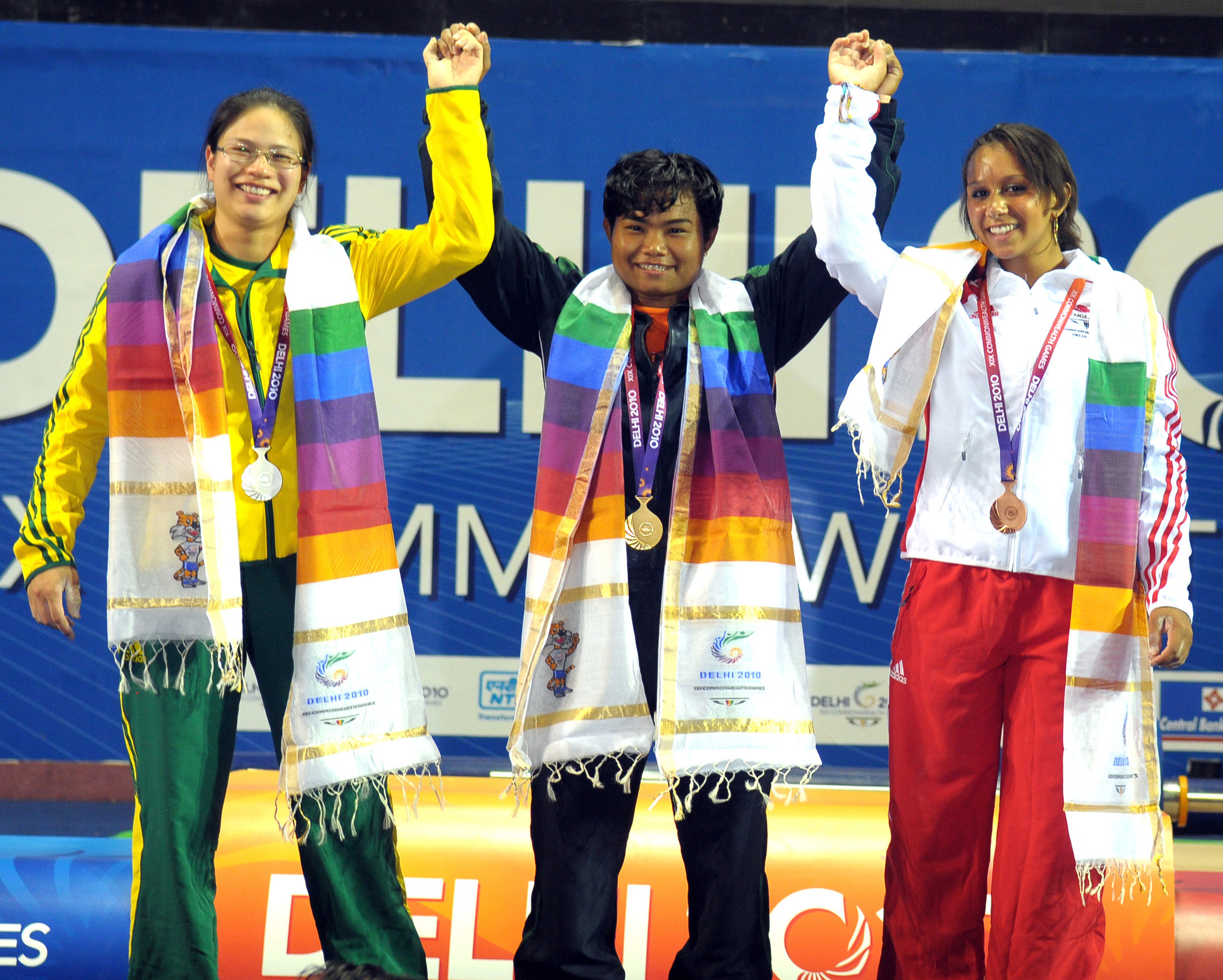
- Seen Lee (left) in 2010 Commonwealth Games.

Personal information
- Nationality: Australian
- Born: 15 November 1982 (age 43) Melbourne, Victoria
- Education: Mac.Robertson Girls' High School, RMIT University
- Height: 1.6 m (5 ft 3 in) (2012)
- Weight: 58 kg (128 lb)

Sport
- Country: Australia
- Sport: Weightlifting
- Events: 58 kg — Women, 63 kg — Women
- Club: Hawthorn Weightlifting Club
Medal record
Women's weightlifting
Representing Australia
Commonwealth Games
Silver medal – second place	2010 Delhi	58 kg
Bronze medal – third place	2002 Manchester	53 kg snatch
Bronze medal – third place	2002 Manchester	53 kg clean & jerk
Bronze medal – third place	2002 Manchester	53 kg combined
Pacific Games
Bronze medal – third place	2019 Apia	59 kg
Commonwealth Championships
Silver medal – second place	2016 Penang	63 kg
Silver medal – second place	2017 Gold Coast	63 kg
Oceania Championships
Gold medal – first place	2008 Auckland	58 kg
Gold medal – first place	2009 Darwin	63 kg
Gold medal – first place	2011 Darwin	58 kg
Gold medal – first place	2014 Le Mont-Dore	63 kg
Silver medal – second place	2013 Brisbane	58 kg
Bronze medal – third place	2019 Apia	59 kg
Arafura Games
Gold medal – first place	2009 Darwin	63 kg
Gold medal – first place	2011 Darwin	58 kg
Bronze medal – third place	2019 Darwin	59 kg
- Updated on 26 January 2022

Seen Lee (born 15 November 1982) is an Australian weightlifter. She won a bronze medal at the 2002 Commonwealth Games and a silver at the 2010 Commonwealth Games. She represented Australia in weightlifting at the 2012 Summer Olympics.

== Personal ==
Lee was born on 15 November 1982 in Melbourne, Victoria and continues to reside in the city. She attended Donvale Primary School, before going to high school at The Mac.Robertson Girls' High School. She attended RMIT University from 2000 to 2004, where she earned a Bachelor of Engineering. She works full-time as mining engineer, for a company that accommodates her competition schedule.

Lee is 160 centimetres (63 in) tall and weighs 58 kilograms (128 lb).

== Weightlifting ==
Lee is a weightlifter competing in the 58 kg — Women event. She is a member of the Hawthorn Weightlifting Club and bases her training in Melbourne. She was coached by Martin Leach from 1999 to 2001, then changed coaches in 2001 to Anthony Dove who continued to be her coach going into the 2012 Summer Olympics.

Lee holds several Australian women's weightlifting records. In the women's 53 kg snatch, she set a record of 78 kg on 14 December 2002, and 162 in the total lift on 31 July 2002. She has three records in the women's 58 kg class, 96 kg in the snatch on 20 December 2008, 112 kg in the clean and jerk on 20 December 2008, and 208 kg in the total event on 20 December 2008. In the 63 kg women's class, she set a record of 93 kg on 20 September 2008 in the snatch event, 110 kg on 20 September 2008 in the clean and jerk, and 203 kg in the total event on 20 September 2008. In 2008, she set a Commonwealth snatch record. In 2008, she was the top female athlete in the Sinclair ranking system.

Lee has represented Australia in international competitions for ten years. In 2002, she was the first woman to earn a Commonwealth Games medal in weightlifting when she earned a bronze medal in the 53 kg featherweight division for the snatch, clean and jerk and combined events. She missed the 2006 Commonwealth Games due to a 2-year suspension for doping, namely furosemide. She won Australia's first medal, a silver medal in the 58 kg women's event, at the 2010 Commonwealth Games. Despite a total lift of 192 kilograms (423 lb), she missed out on gold by 5 kilograms (11 lb) to Indian lifter Renu Bala Chanu Yumnam.

Lee has competed in several other competitions. She finished first at the 2011 Victorian Championships in the 63 - kg women's event. She finished first in the 58 kg — Women event at the 2011 Oceania Championships, the 2012 Arafura Games and the 2012 Australian Championships. She finished second at the 2011 Australian Championships. She finished twenty-eighth at the 2011 World Championships.

The 2012 Australian Championships were the Australian qualifying event for the Summer Olympics with the country having secured only one spot at the Games. To secure her spot, Lee beat Jenna Myers and dual Olympian Deborah Acason. She lifted 117 kilograms (258 lb) in the clean and jerk event to earn her spot. She was selected to represent Australia at the 2012 Summer Olympics, where she made her inaugural Olympic appearance. She was the only female Australian competitor. She competed in the women's -63 kg weightclass and finished in 4th place.

At the 2014 Commonwealth Games, she returned to competing in the -58 kg category, finishing in 6th place.
