= Iuniarra Sipaia =

Samoan weightlifter (born 1993)

Personal information
- Nickname: June
- Born: 25 June 1993 (age 33) Motootua, Samoa

Sport
- Country: Samoa
- Sport: Weightlifting
- Coached by: Jeremiah Wallwork
Medal record
Women's weightlifting
Representing Samoa
Pacific Games
Gold medal – first place	2023 Honiara	+87 kg
Bronze medal – third place	2011 Nouméa	+75 kg
Bronze medal – third place	2019 Apia	+87 kg
Commonwealth Championships
Gold medal – first place	2016 Penang	+75 kg
Silver medal – second place	2017 Gold Coast	+90 kg
Bronze medal – third place	2012 Apia	+75 kg
Bronze medal – third place	2019 Apia	+87 kg
Oceania Championships
Gold medal – first place	2016 Suva	+75 kg
Gold medal – first place	2022 Saipan	+87 kg
Gold medal – first place	2023 Honiara	+87 kg
Gold medal – first place	2024 Auckland	+87 kg
Gold medal – first place	2025 Meyuns	+86 kg
Gold medal – first place	2026 Apia	+86 kg
Silver medal – second place	2017 Gold Coast	+90 kg
Silver medal – second place	2018 Le Mont-Dore	+90 kg
Silver medal – second place	2021	+87 kg
Bronze medal – third place	2011 Darwin	+75 kg
Bronze medal – third place	2014 Le Mont-Dore	+75 kg
Bronze medal – third place	2019 Apia	+87 kg
Pacific Mini Games
Gold medal – first place	2013 Mata Utu	+75 kg
Asian Indoor and Martial Arts Games
Bronze medal – third place	2017 Ashgabat	+90 kg
Arafura Games
Silver medal – second place	2019 Darwin	+87 kg
Bronze medal – third place	2011 Darwin	+75 kg

Iuniarra Sipaia (née Simanu, born 25 June 1993) is a Samoan female weightlifter. She has represented Samoa in several international competitions such as Pacific Mini Games, Commonwealth Games, Oceania Weightlifting Championships and Asian Indoor and Martial Arts Games.

== Career ==
As a junior, she participated at the 2010 Summer Youth Olympics in the Girls' +63 event. She participated at the 2010 Commonwealth Games in the +75 kg event. She won the bronze medal at the 2011 Pacific Games.

Iuniarra won gold medal at the 2013 Pacific Mini Games in the over 75 kg category and set a new milestone in the sport of weightlifting in Samoa. She competed in the women's +75 kg category at the 2014 Commonwealth Games. She continued her dominance in the sport at the 2016 Oceania Weightlifting Championships, winning 3 gold medals in the over 75 kg categories. She was also part of the Samoan delegation which made its debut at the 2017 Asian Indoor and Martial Arts Games and claimed a bronze medal in the women's +90 kg event.

At the 2017 Australian Open Weightlifting Championships, she emerged as runners-up to New Zealand transgender weightlifter, Laurel Hubbard. Hubbard lifted a weight of 268 kg, which was 19 kg more than Sipaia's lift and raised controversial issues relating to the approval of Hubbard to compete at the international level.

After the 2017 Asian Indoor and Martial Arts Games she was subsequently suspended for using Triamcinolone acetonide. In April 2018 she cleared herself out and her ban was abolished. However, she missed the 2017 Pacific Mini Games, where she was a defending champion and couldn't compete at the 2018 Commonwealth Games. She qualified for the 2020 Olympic games, but was unable to attend due to the COVID-19 pandemic.

At the 2023 World Weightlifting Championships in September 2023 she qualified for the 2024 Summer Olympics in Paris, France. In 2024, she finished in 11th place in the women's +81 kg event at the 2024 Summer Olympics.

== Major results ==
Year	Venue	Weight	Snatch (kg)				Clean & Jerk (kg)				Total	Rank
Year	Venue	Weight	1	2	3	Rank	1	2	3	Rank	Total	Rank
Summer Olympics
2024	Paris, France	+81 kg	100	105	~~110~~	—N/a	~~141~~	141	~~148~~	—N/a	246	11
World Championships
2018	Ashgabat, Turkmenistan	+87 kg	102	107	~~111~~	16	135	140	143	13	250	15
2019	Pattaya, Thailand	+87 kg	102	~~107~~	~~107~~	18	141	146	~~150~~	11	248	16
2023	Riyadh, Saudi Arabia	+87 kg	~~105~~	105	110	10	~~145~~	146	~~150~~	7	256	8
IWF World Cup
2024	Phuket, Thailand	+87 kg	105	110	112	10	150	155	~~160~~	6	267	7
Pacific Games
2011	Nouméa, New Caledonia	+75 kg	87			3rd place, bronze medalist(s)	112			3rd place, bronze medalist(s)	199	3rd place, bronze medalist(s)
2019	Apia, Samoa	+87 kg	103	104	108	3rd place, bronze medalist(s)	142	~~147~~	147	1st place, gold medalist(s)	255	3rd place, bronze medalist(s)
2023	Honiara, Solomon Islands	+87 kg	102	107	~~112~~	2nd place, silver medalist(s)	145	~~153~~	~~158~~	1st place, gold medalist(s)	252	1st place, gold medalist(s)
Oceania Championships
2010	Suva, Fiji	+75 kg	75	80	83	4	96	~~101~~	105	4	188	4
2011	Darwin, Australia	+75 kg	88			3rd place, bronze medalist(s)	115			3rd place, bronze medalist(s)	203	3rd place, bronze medalist(s)
2012	Apia, Samoa	+75 kg	92	96	~~99~~	4	115	121	125	3rd place, bronze medalist(s)	221	4
2014	Mont-Dore, New Caledonia	+75 kg	98	102	~~106~~	3rd place, bronze medalist(s)	127	~~133~~	~~133~~	3rd place, bronze medalist(s)	229	3rd place, bronze medalist(s)
2016	Suva, Fiji	+75 kg	100	104	107	1st place, gold medalist(s)	130	134	139	1st place, gold medalist(s)	246	1st place, gold medalist(s)
2017	Gold Coast, Australia	+90 kg	103	108	~~110~~	2nd place, silver medalist(s)	137	142	~~146~~	2nd place, silver medalist(s)	250	2nd place, silver medalist(s)
2018	Mont-Dore, New Caledonia	+90 kg	102	106	~~110~~	1st place, gold medalist(s)	~~136~~	~~136~~	136	2nd place, silver medalist(s)	242	2nd place, silver medalist(s)
2019	Apia, Samoa	+87 kg	103	104	108	3rd place, bronze medalist(s)	142	~~147~~	147	1st place, gold medalist(s)	255	3rd place, bronze medalist(s)
2021	Various, Oceania	+87 kg	~~102~~	102	107	2nd place, silver medalist(s)	~~141~~	141	~~146~~	2nd place, silver medalist(s)	248	2nd place, silver medalist(s)
2022	Saipan, Northern Mariana Islands	+87 kg	102	104	~~112~~	2nd place, silver medalist(s)	147	153	157	1st place, gold medalist(s)	261	1st place, gold medalist(s)
2024	Auckland, New Zealand	+87 kg	101	~~106~~	110	2nd place, silver medalist(s)	145	~~155~~	155	1st place, gold medalist(s)	265	1st place, gold medalist(s)
Arafura Games
2019	Darwin, Australia	+87 kg	~~102~~	102	107	2	140	144	146	1	253	2nd place, silver medalist(s)
Commonwealth Games
2010	Delhi, India	+75 kg	82	86	~~90~~	—N/a	105	110	~~112~~	—N/a	196	7
2014	Glasgow, Scotland	+75 kg	98	102	~~105~~	—N/a	126	131	~~136~~	—N/a	233	5
Commonwealth Championships
2013	Penang, Malaysia	+75 kg	100			5	126			6	226	5
2016	Penang, Malaysia	+75 kg	99	104	108	1st place, gold medalist(s)	125	130	135	1st place, gold medalist(s)	243	1st place, gold medalist(s)
2017	Gold Coast, Australia	+90 kg	103	108	~~110~~	2nd place, silver medalist(s)	137	142	~~146~~	2nd place, silver medalist(s)	250	2nd place, silver medalist(s)
2019	Apia, Samoa	+87 kg	103	104	108	3rd place, bronze medalist(s)	142	~~147~~	147	1st place, gold medalist(s)	255	3rd place, bronze medalist(s)
