= Palau at the 2023 Pacific Games =

- National federation: Palau National Olympic Committee

19 November 2023 – 2 December 2023
- Competitors: 23 (14 men and 9 women) in 4 sports
- Medals Ranked 22nd: Gold 0 Silver 0 Bronze 3 Total 3

Pacific Games appearances
- 1999; 2003; 2007; 2011; 2015; 2019; 2023

Palau competed at the 2023 Pacific Games in Honiara from 19 November to 2 December 2023. This was Palau's seventh appearance at the Pacific Games since first competing in 1999.

On 13 October 2023, the Palau National Olympic Committee announced its participation in 9 sports.

== Competitors ==
The following is the list of number of competitors confirmed for the Games.

Sport	Men	Women	Total
Archery			
Athletics	1	2	3
Basketball	4	0	4
Judo	1	1	2
Outrigger canoeing			
Swimming			
Table tennis			
Volleyball			
Weightlifting	8	6	14
Total	14	9	23

== Athletics ==
Palau Track and Field Association have selected 3 athletes for the games.

Key

- Note–Ranks given for track events are within the athlete's heat only
- Q = Qualified for the next round
- q = Qualified for the next round as a fastest loser or, in field events, by position without achieving the qualifying target
- qR = Qualified to the next round by referee judgement
- NR = National record
- N/A = Round not applicable for the event
- Bye = Athlete not required to compete in round

Men

Athlete	Event	Heat		Semifinal		Final	
Athlete	Event	Result	Rank	Result	Rank	Result	Rank
Ignacio Blaluk	100 m						
Ignacio Blaluk	200 m						

Women

Athlete	Event	Heat		Semifinal		Final	
Athlete	Event	Result	Rank	Result	Rank	Result	Rank
Sydney Francisco	100 m						
Sydney Francisco	200 m						
Christina Wicker	1500 m	—					
Christina Wicker	5000 m	—					

== Basketball ==
Palau qualified only one team, men's 3x3 basketball team, for the Games based on their FIBA Oceania rankings.

=== 3×3 basketball ===
Summary

Team	Event	Pool play						Semifinals	Final / GM	
Team	Event	Opposition Score	Opposition Score	Opposition Score	Opposition Score	Opposition Score	Rank	Opposition Score	Opposition Score	Rank
Palau men's	Men's tournament	Tonga –	Guam –	Cook Islands –	Fiji –	French Polynesia –				

==== Men's tournament ====
Team roster

- One team of 4 athletes

== Judo ==
The Palau National Olympic Committee have selected 2 judokas for the Games.

Athlete	Event	Round of 32	Round of 16	Quarterfinals	Semifinals	Repechage	Final / GM	
Athlete	Event	Opposition Result	Opposition Result	Opposition Result	Opposition Result	Opposition Result	Opposition Result	Rank
Alonzo Sumor	Men's -73 kg							
Carisma Aguon	Women's -70 kg							

== Weightlifting ==
The Palau National Olympic Committee selected fourteen weightlifters (8 men, 6 women) for the 2023 Games.

Men

Athlete	Event	Snatch	Rank	Clean & jerk	Rank	Total	Rank
Blaine Patris	61 kg						
Gyro Ramirez	61 kg						
Stevick Patris	73 kg						
Junior Sumor	81 kg						
Xyrus Salii-Debold	81 kg						
Benedict Kintaro	96 kg						
Usher Pedro	96 kg						
Mallik Aquino	102 kg						

Women

Athlete	Event	Snatch	Rank	Clean & jerk	Rank	Total	Rank
Jezzlee Baiei	49 kg						
Roxanne Canete	55 kg						
Jamaira Richard	59 kg						
Kyrah Nestor	64 kg						
Claire Kintoki	81 kg						
Lincy Marino	87 kg						
