= Palau at the 2015 Pacific Games =

- IOC code: PLW

4 July 2015 – 18 July 2015
- Competitors: 14 in 4 sports
- Flag bearer: Stevick Patris
- Medals Ranked 20th: Gold 0 Silver 1 Bronze 1 Total 2

Pacific Games appearances
- 1999; 2003; 2007; 2011; 2015; 2019; 2023

Palau competed at the 2015 Pacific Games in Port Moresby, Papua New Guinea from 4 to 18 July 2015. Palau listed 14 competitors as of 4 July 2015.

== Athletics ==
Palau qualified five athletes in track and field:

Women

- Ruby Joy Gabriel

Men

- Gwynn Iderirk Uehara
- Rodman Teltull
- Shaquille Teltull
- Francis Tkel

== Swimming ==
Palau qualified five athletes in swimming:

Women

- Roylin Akiwo
- Dirngulbai Misech
- Ikelau Misech

Men

- Noel Keane
- Shawn Wallace

== Table tennis ==
Palau qualified three athletes in table tennis:

Women

- Zoya Renguul

Men

- Elias Aguon
- Samuel Saunders

== Weightlifting ==
Palau qualified one athlete in weightlifting:

Men

- Stevick Patris – 69 kg Snatch.
