= Palau at the 2019 Pacific Games =

- National federation: Palau National Olympic Committee
- Website: www.oceaniasport.com/palau

in Apia, Samoa 8 July 2019 – 20 July 2019
- Competitors: 40 (24 men and 16 women) in 7 sports
- Medals Ranked 24th: Gold 0 Silver 0 Bronze 0 Total 0

Pacific Games appearances
- 1999; 2003; 2007; 2011; 2015; 2019; 2023

Palau was represented at the 2019 Pacific Games in Apia, Samoa by the Palau National Olympic Committee.

In total, 40 athletes including 24 men and 16 women represented Palau in seven different sports including archery, athletics, judo, swimming, table tennis, va'a and volleyball.

== Background ==
Originally, the 2019 Pacific Games were to ba staged in Nukuʻalofa, Tonga However, the country pulled out of hosting the games in 2017. Following a second bidding process, the games were awarded to Apia, Samoa and would be staged between 6 and 20 July 2019.

== Competitors ==
In total, 40 athletes represented Palau at the 2019 Pacific Games in Apia, Samoa across seven different sports.

Sport	Men	Women	Total
Archery	4	0	4
Athletics	8	0	8
Judo	2	0	2
Swimming	2	3	5
Table tennis	3	1	4
Va'a	3	10	13
Volleyball	2	2	4
Total	24	16	40

== Archery ==
In total, four Palauan athletes participated in the archery events – Tutii Chilton, Brandon Giramur, Edward Kenic and Christopher Ongrung.

== Athletics ==
In total, eight Palauan athletes participated in the athletics events – Koyven Emery, Garsten Gibbons, Adrian Ililau, Cristian Nicolescu, Gaines Ryon, Rodman Teltull, Florian Temengil and Gwenn Uehara.

== Judo ==
In total, two Palauan athletes participated in the judo events – Malcolm Gaymann and Jarvis Tarkong.

== Swimming ==
In total, five Palauan athletes participated in the swimming events – Roylin Akiwo, Osisang Chilton, Noel Keane, Dirngulbai Misech and Shawn Wallace.

== Table tennis ==
In total, four Palauan athletes participated in the table tennis events – Elias Aguon, Samuel Saunders, Shawnessy Soalablai and Orachel Watanabe.

== Va'a ==
In total, 13 Palauan athletes participated in the va'a events – Zhatayen Cooper, Jimmy Jonas Jnr, Javits Kiep, Ochebir Ngiraingas, Bill Jasmer Tony Ngirarsaol, Mariah Okada, Pkngey Otobed, Samantha Rechelluul, Nihla Reddin, Miel Sequeira-Holm, Elilai Sugiyama, Elsei Tellei and Nikki Uehara.

== Volleyball ==
In total, four Palauan athletes participated in the volleyball events – Hila Asanuma, Edson Ngiraiwet, Texxon Taro and Holly Yamada.
