= Apolonia Vaivai =

Fijian weightlifter (born 1991)

Personal information
- Born: 5 February 1991 (age 35) Taveuni, Fiji
- Height: 1.53 m (5 ft 0 in)
- Weight: 75 kg (165 lb)

Sport
- Sport: Weightlifting
- Event: 75 kg
Medal record
Representing Fiji
Women's weightlifting
Commonwealth Games
Bronze medal – third place	2014 Glasgow	75 kg
Bronze medal – third place	2018 Gold Coast	69 kg
Asian Indoor and Martial Arts Games
Silver medal – second place	2017 Ashgabat	69 kg
Pacific Games
Silver medal – second place	2015 Port Moresby	75 kg
Bronze medal – third place	2011 Nouméa	69 kg
Commonwealth Championships
Gold medal – first place	2015 Pune	69 kg
Gold medal – first place	2016 Penang	75 kg
Gold medal – first place	2017 Gold Coast	69 kg
Oceania Championships
Gold medal – first place	2016 Suva	69 kg
Gold medal – first place	2017 Gold Coast	69 kg
Silver medal – second place	2014 Le Mont-Dore	75 kg
Silver medal – second place	2015 Port Moresby	75 kg
Bronze medal – third place	2011 Darwin (Note: Arafura Games also)	69 kg
Bronze medal – third place	2012 Apia	75 kg
- Updated on 28 January 2022

Apolonia Vaivai MOF (born 5 February 1991) is a Fijian weightlifter. She won a bronze medal in the women's 75 kg event at the 2014 Commonwealth Games. In 2016, she won gold at the Oceania Weightlifting Championships in the 69 kg event. Vaivai won another bronze medal in the 69 kg category at the 2018 Commonwealth Games.

Medalbox note
