= Outrigger canoeing at the 2019 Pacific Games =

- Venue: Sheraton Samoa Beach Resort
- Location: Mulifanua, Apia, Samoa
- Dates: 9–13 July 2019

Outrigger canoeing at the 2019 Pacific Games was held in Samoa from 9–13 July at the Sheraton Samoa Beach Resort, Mulifanua, which is approximately 40 kilometres west of the capital, Apia.

Va'a rudderless outrigger canoes were used for all twelve medal events.

== Teams ==
The nations competing were:

- American Samoa
- Cook Islands
- Federated States of Micronesia
- Fiji
- Guam
- New Caledonia
- Northern Mariana Islands
- Palau
- Papua New Guinea
- Samoa
- Solomon Islands
- Tahiti
- Tokelau
- Tonga
- Wallis and Futuna

== Medal summary ==
=== Medal table ===
* Host nation (Samoa)

Rank	Nation	Gold	Silver	Bronze	Total
1	Tahiti	10	0	0	10
2	New Caledonia	2	6	0	8
3	Fiji	0	2	4	6
4	Wallis and Futuna	0	2	2	4
5	Samoa*	0	1	2	3
6	Papua New Guinea	0	1	1	2
7	Cook Islands	0	0	3	3
Totals (7 entries)		12	12	12	36

Updated to 11 July 2019

=== Men's results ===
Event	Gold		Silver		Bronze		Ref
V1 500 m	Kevin Ceran Jerusalemy (TAH)		Titouan Puyo (NCL)		Andre Tutaka-George (COK)		
V6 500 m	New Caledonia	1:42.07	Fiji	1:42.45	Wallis and Futuna	1:48.93	
V6 1500 m	Tahiti		New Caledonia		Wallis and Futuna		
V12 500 m	New Caledonia	1:49.43	Wallis and Futuna	1:50.06	Fiji	1:51.50	
V1 16 km (time= h:min:s)	Kevin Ceran Jerusalemy (TAH)		Albert Mainguet (NCL)		Andre Tutaka-George (COK)		
V6 24 km (time= h:min:s)	Tahiti		Wallis and Futuna		Fiji		

=== Women's results ===
Event	Gold		Silver		Bronze		Ref
V1 500 m	Vaimiti Maoni (TAH)		Elenoa Vateitei (FIJ)		Anne Cairns (SAM)		
V6 500 m	Tahiti		New Caledonia		Fiji		
V6 1500 m	Tahiti		New Caledonia		Papua New Guinea		
V12 500 m	Tahiti	2:04.85	Papua New Guinea	2:06.50	Samoa	2:10.55	
V1 16 km (time= h:min:s)	Marguerite Temaiana (TAH)		Anne Cairns (SAM)		Elenoa Vateitei (FIJ)		
V6 24 km (time= h:min:s)	Tahiti		New Caledonia		Cook Islands		

== See also ==
- Outrigger canoeing at the Pacific Games
