= Erika Yamasaki =

Australian weightlifter (born 1987)

Personal information
- Full name: Erika Yuriko Iris Yamasaki
- Nationality: Australia
- Born: 2 September 1987 (age 38) Darwin, Northern Territory, Australia
- Height: 4 ft 11 in (150 cm)
- Weight: 59 kg (130 lb)

Sport
- Sport: Weightlifting
- Event: –55/59kg
- Club: Cougars Weightlifting Club
Medal record
Women's weightlifting
Representing Australia
Commonwealth Games
Bronze medal – third place	2006 Melbourne	48 kg
Pacific Games
Gold medal – first place	2015 Port Moresby	53 kg
Gold medal – first place	2019 Apia	59 kg
Commonwealth Championships
Gold medal – first place	2016 Penang	58 kg
Silver medal – second place	2017 Gold Coast	58 kg
Bronze medal – third place	2019 Apia	59 kg
Oceania Championships
Gold medal – first place	2015 Port Moresby	53 kg
Gold medal – first place	2016 Suva	48 kg
Gold medal – first place	2019 Apia	59 kg
Silver medal – second place	2011 Darwin	58 kg
Silver medal – second place	2014 Le Mont-Dore	58 kg
Bronze medal – third place	2013 Brisbane	53 kg
Arafura Games
Gold medal – first place	2019 Darwin	59 kg
Silver medal – second place	2011 Darwin	58 kg

Erika Yuriko Iris Yamasaki (born 2 September 1987) is an Australian weightlifter. The daughter of Minoru Yamasaki and Ann Alvisio, she started Weightlifting in 2000, when she was tested in a talent identification program, along with her brother John Yamasaki. Erika first started to represent Australia in 2003 at the Oceania Championships, Niue Island. She has now competed at several international events, including Oceania Championships, World Championships, World Cup, Commonwealth Championships, Pacific and Commonwealth Games.

She represented Australia at the 2020 Summer Olympics in Tokyo, Japan. She finished in 12th place in the women's 59 kg event.

== Career ==
Erika Yamasaki won a bronze medal at the 2006 Commonwealth Games in the women's 48 kilogram event by snatching 69 kilograms, and clean and jerking 87 kilograms.

After the 2006 Commonwealth Games she had an operation to remove a labral tear in her hip joint which she obtained late 2005 whilst training.

At the 2010 Commonwealth Games she competed in the 48 kilogram event, snatching 73 kilograms, which was an Oceania record, but unfortunately was injured during the warm up for the clean and jerk, tearing the internal ligament in her elbow, and was not able to secure a clean and jerk result.

Prior to weight class and age group changes Yamasaki held 23 Queensland, 15 Australian records and 1 Oceania record, including events in the under 16, under 18 and open categories from weight classes from the 40 kg division to the 58 kg divisions inclusive.

Yamasaki is the first and only female to clean and jerk double body weight in Australia. At the 2015 National Championships she successfully lifted 106 kg in the 53 kg division.

== International record ==
2003

- Oceania & South Pacific Junior Championships – Niue

2004

- Oceania Senior & Junior Championships – Suva, Fiji
- World Junior Championships – Minsk, Belarus
- Mermet Cup (AUS vs. USA) – Melbourne, Australia
- Commonwealth Youth Games – Bendigo, Australia

2005

- Australian Youth Olympic Festival – Sydney, Australia
- World Junior Championships – Busan, South Korea
- Mermet Cup International – Louisiana, USA
- Commonwealth, Oceania & South Pacific Championships – Melbourne, Australia

2006

- Melbourne Commonwealth Games – Melbourne, Australia
- World Junior Championships – Hangzhou, China

2007

- Arafura Games – Darwin, Northern Territory
- World Junior Championships – Prague, Czech Republic
- IWF World Cup – Apia, Samoa

2010

- Delhi Commonwealth Games – New Delhi, India

2011

- Arafura Games & Oceania Championships – Darwin, Northern Territory

2014

- Glasgow Commonwealth Games – Glasgow, Scotland
- World Senior Championships – Kazakhstan

2015

- Arnold Invitational – Melbourne, Australia
- Pacific Games & Oceania Senior Championships – Port Moresby, Papua New Guinea
- World Senior Championships – Houston, Texas

2016

- Oceania Senior Championships – Suva, Fiji
- Commonwealth Championships – Penang, Malaysia

2016

- Commonwealth & Oceania Championships – Gold Coast, Queensland
- Commonwealth Championships – Penang, Malaysia

2016

- Arafura Games – Darwin, Northern Territory

== Personal bests ==
Lift	Weight	Date
Snatch	84.0 kg	2015
Clean & Jerk	106.0 kg	2015
Total	188.0 kg	2015
