= Federated States of Micronesia at the 2015 Pacific Games =

- IOC code: FSM

4 July 2015 – 18 July 2015
- Competitors: 44 in 6 sports
- Flag bearer: Manuel Minginfel
- Medals Ranked 14th: Gold 3 Silver 1 Bronze 0 Total 4

Pacific Games appearances
- 1975; 1979–1995; 1999; 2003; 2007; 2011; 2015; 2019; 2023

The Federated States of Micronesia competed at the 2015 Pacific Games in Port Moresby, Papua New Guinea from 4 to 18 July 2015. The Federated States of Micronesia listed 44 competitors as of 4 July 2015.

== Athletics ==
The Federated States of Micronesia qualified 6 athletes in track and field

Women

- Lihen H. Jonas

Men

- Pahnrasko Ardos
- Roy Elwise
- Kitson Kapiriel
- Penter Pluhs
- Daniel G. G. Ramngen

== Boxing ==
The Federated States of Micronesia qualified 5 athletes in boxing

Women

- Jennifer Chieng

Men

- Daryll Keller
- Derick-Dean Perman
- Angelo Rodriquez
- Royce Johnson Rott

== Football ==
The Federated States of Micronesia qualified a men's football team (25 players)

Men

- Aaran J. Bayow
- Devon Figirmow
- Dominic Gadad
- Dominic X. Gadad
- Jonathan Garayog
- Benjamin Gilimoon
- Curtis Graham
- Macarthur James
- Paulis Jeikek
- Mark Jones
- Mark W. Jones
- Ioane Kariti
- Javin W. Kognang
- Mikson Kuka
- Roger Nakasone
- Jacob Nam
- Thomas Nam
- Kacy Alton Olmos
- Walter Francisco Pongkagnang Pengelbew
- Lorenzo Pluhs
- Michael Reyes
- Scott Rudolph
- Ignatius M. Ruwaath
- Jordan M. Ruwetathin
- Franson Simeon

== Swimming ==
The Federated States of Micronesia qualified 2 athletes in swimming

Women

- Debra Daniel

Men

- Dionisio Augustine II

== Tennis ==
The Federated States of Micronesia qualified 2 athletes in tennis

Men

- TJ Rush Apis

Men

- Faaleo Tevaga

== Weightlifting ==
The Federated States of Micronesia qualified 4 athletes in weightlifting:

Men

- Fidelas Falmed
- Manuel Minginfel
- Einstein Perman
- Alvin John G. Ruuemau
