= Weightlifting at the 2010 Commonwealth Games – Men's 105 kg =

The Men's 105 kg weightlifting was a weightlifting competition, limiting competitors to a maximum of 105 kilograms of body mass. The competition took place on 10 October. The weightlifter from Samoa won the gold, with a combined lift of 338 kg.

== Results ==
Rank	Name	Country	Group	B.weight (kg)	Snatch (kg)	Clean & Jerk (kg)	Total (kg)
1st place, gold medalist(s)	Niusila Opeloge	Samoa	A	103.57	147	191	338
2nd place, silver medalist(s)	Stanislav Chalaev	New Zealand	A	104.04	150	184	334
3rd place, bronze medalist(s)	Curtis Onaghinor	Nigeria	A	102.75	145	187	332
4	Robert Galsworthy	Australia	A	104.77	145	184	329
5	Gurbinder Cheema	England	A	103.19	150	178	328
6	Thomas Yule	Scotland	A	104.61	147	180	327
7	Sajjad Malik	Pakistan	A	104.74	150	176	326
8	Can Osman	Cyprus	A	98.62	135	170	305
9	M. Rajapaksha	Sri Lanka	A	103.60	135	152	287
10	Biddut Roy	Bangladesh	A	103.98	120	150	270
11	Nii Larykne	Ghana	A	102.21	110	140	250
–	Tovia Opeloge	Samoa	A	103.81	–	–	DNF

== See also ==
- 2010 Commonwealth Games
- Weightlifting at the 2010 Commonwealth Games
