= Minati Sethi =

Indian weightlifter (born 1990)

Personal information
- Nationality: Indian
- Born: Minati Sethi; 11 February 1990 (age 36) Puri, Odisha, India

Sport
- Country: India
- Sport: Weightlifting
- Event: –58 kg
Medal record
Women's weightlifting
Representing India
Commonwealth Weightlifting Championships
Gold medal – first place	2012 Apia	58 kg
Silver medal – second place	2009 Penang	53 kg
Bronze medal – third place	2013 Penang	58 kg

Minati Sethi (born 11 February 1990) is a former Indian weightlifter from Odisha. She competed in the 58 kg category and represented India at international competitions. She competed at the 2010 World Weightlifting Championships.

== Career ==
Sethi made her international debut at the 2009 Asian Weightlifting Championships, where she finished 10th in the women's 53 kg category. She won her first medal at the 2009 Commonwealth Weightlifting Championships at Malaysia winning silver medal in the women's 53 kg category.

In 2012, she won her first gold medal in the women's 58 kg category at the 2012 Commonwealth Weightlifting Championships held at Samoa.

She also won gold medal at the 2012 South Asian Weightlifting Championships held at Kathmandu. She was provisionally suspended from competing in late 2015 after failing a dope test during 2013 Commonwealth Weightlifting Championships.
