= Saraswati Rout =

Indian weightlifter (born 1995)

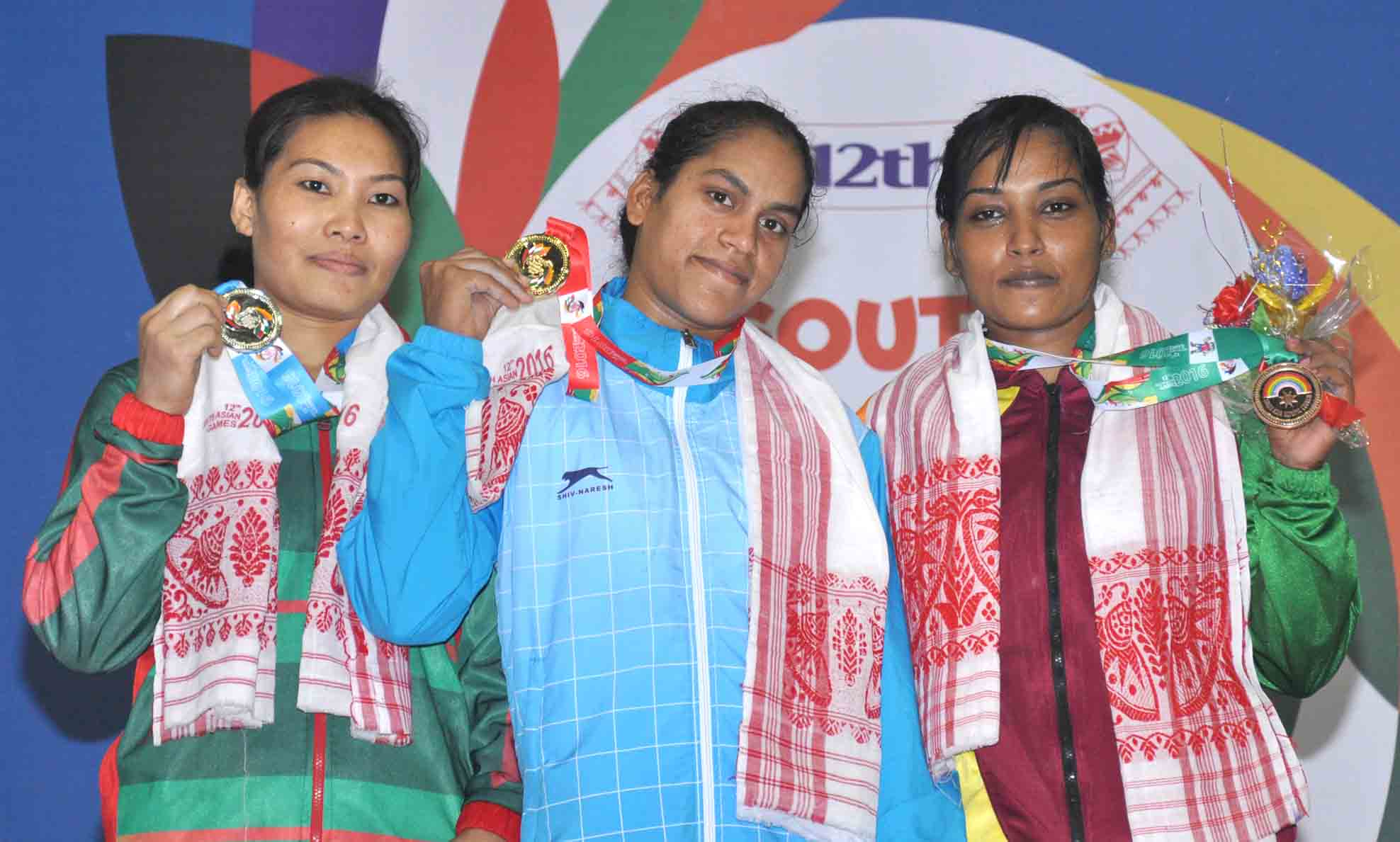
- Saraswati Rout (center) in 2016 South Asian Games.

Personal information
- Nationality: Indian
- Born: 10 June 1995 (age 31) Kendrapara, Odisha, India

Sport
- Country: India
- Sport: Weightlifting
- Event: 58 kg
Medal record
Women's weightlifting
Representing India
Commonwealth Championships
Bronze medal – third place	2017 Gold Coast	58 kg
South Asian Games
Gold medal – first place	2016 Guwahati and Shillong	58 kg

Saraswati Rout is an Indian weightlifter from Odisha. She won the bronze medal at the 2017 Gold Coast Championships.
