= Federated States of Micronesia at the 2019 Pacific Games =

8 July 2019 – 20 July 2019
- Competitors: in 5 sports

Pacific Games appearances
- 1975; 1979–1995; 1999; 2003; 2007; 2011; 2015; 2019; 2023

Federated States of Micronesia competed at the 2019 Pacific Games in Apia, Samoa from 7 to 20 July 2019. The country participated in five sports at the 2019 games.

The nation was managed by three managers, Castro Joab, Alik Jackson and Loatis Seneres.

== Track and Field ==
The FSM coach representing the sprinters is Rendy Germinaro, and all the sprinters are from the State of Chuuk, Scott James Fiti, Kiudone David, Francis Rigat, McMahon Oneisom, and Benoni Kin, and the one female runner is Darla Jonah, from Pohnpei. The runners will compete in 100 meter, 200 meter, 400 meter, 4x100 meter relay and 4x400 meter relay races.

== Boxing ==
FSM has nominated one athlete to compete in boxing at the 2019 games. Coached by Erick Divinagracia, Olympian Jennifer Chieng was the only boxer to participate.

Women

- Jennifer Chieng

== Outrigger canoeing ==
The FSM men Outrigger Canoeing group competed V6 (six men canoe) in sprint, middle, and long-distance events. All the FSM paddlers are from the FSM state of Yap, coached by Stanley Magholyalor. The competitors are Joseph Mariana Faigereg, Destry Nakui Yaiungelpiy, Ezer Haleyaeyur, Joeider Luglith, Raymond Fal, Jayven Tachibelmel, Chester Piyerigyal, and M’kenzy Mochgel. The V6 prelimaries occurred on July 9, and FSM finished in 4th, behind Wallis and Futuna, Samoa, and Cook Islands.

== Tennis ==
Two players were nominated to compete in tennis at the 2019 games.

Men

- Asher Johnson
- George Jones

== Volleyball ==
The FSM men's volleyball team came from Chuuk, coached Anthony K. Bualuay and Haster Aritos, who selected Franson Lee Aritos, Brandon Lee Aritos, Am Albert, Thorn Aritos, Inet John, Lasty John, Simson John, Canory Masaichy, T-Ranito Thomas Narruhn, Gabriel Saladier. Jayheart Orichiro Siren, and Junior Serious.
