= Curtis Onaghinor =

Nigerian weightlifter

Personal information
- Full name: Curtis Onaghinor
- Born: 13 February 1980 (age 46)
- Weight: 102.75 kg (226.5 lb)

Sport
- Country: Nigeria
- Sport: Weightlifting
- Weight class: 105 kg
- Team: National team
- Updated on 18 October 2016

Curtis Onaghinor (born 13 February 1980) is a Nigerian male weightlifter, competing in the 105 kg category and representing Nigeria at international competitions. He won the bronze medal at the 2010 Commonwealth Games in the 105 kg event.

== Major competitions ==
Year	Venue	Weight	Snatch (kg)				Clean & Jerk (kg)				Total	Rank
Year	Venue	Weight	1	2	3	Rank	1	2	3	Rank	Total	Rank
Commonwealth Games
2010	Delhi, India	105 kg	145	~~150~~	~~150~~	—N/a	~~187~~	~~187~~	187	—N/a	332	3rd place, bronze medalist(s)
