= Sajjad Amin Malik =

Pakistani weightlifter

Personal information
- Full name: Sajjad Amin Malik
- Born: 3 December 1973 (age 52)
- Weight: 104.74 kg (230.9 lb)

Sport
- Country: Pakistan
- Sport: Weightlifting
- Weight class: 105 kg
- Team: National team
Medal record
Men's weightlifting
Representing Pakistan
South Asian Games
Gold medal – first place	2004 Islamabad	105 kg

Sajjad Amin Malik (born 3 December 1973) is a Pakistani former weightlifter, competing in the 105 kg category and representing Pakistan at international competitions.

He is the cousin of Pakistani weightlifter Shujauddin Malik.

== Career ==
Malik made his international debut at the 2004 South Asian Games held in Islamabad. At these Games he set three new Games records in the 105kg category. His total score was 340 kg, beating the former 1999 record of 325 kg by Indian Manjit Singh. He set this record after breaking both the snatch (155 kg) and clean and jerk (185 kg) Games records, that were held by the same Indian.

Malik represented Pakistan at the 2006 Commonwealth Games, where he was expected to win "at least" a bronze medal. However, he couldn't cope the expectations, and finished fifth after failing to lift the weight of 185 kg in his third attempt. The same year he also participated in the weightlifting competition at the 2006 Asian Games.

For the 2010 Commonwealth Games he was named among the best athletes of the Paikistani team at the Games. At these 2010 Commonwealth Games he competed in the 105 kg event and finished seventh overall.
