= Toua Udia =

Papua New Guinean weightlifter

Personal information
- Full name: Toua Udia
- Born: 7 December 1992 (age 33)
- Weight: 76.48 kg (168.6 lb)

Sport
- Country: Papua New Guinea
- Sport: Weightlifting
- Weight class: 77 kg
- Team: National team
Medal record
Men's weightlifting
Representing Papua New Guinea
Pacific Games
Gold medal – first place	2015 Port Moresby	77 kg
Bronze medal – third place	2011 Nouméa	69 kg
Commonwealth Championships
Bronze medal – third place	2015 Pune	77 kg
Oceania Championships
Gold medal – first place	2015 Port Moresby	77 kg
Silver medal – second place	2017 Gold Coast	77 kg
Bronze medal – third place	2021	89 kg
- Updated on 17 January 2022

Toua Udia (born 7 December 1992) is a Papua New Guinean male weightlifter, competing in the 77 kg category and representing Papua New Guinea at international competitions. He won the bronze medal at the 2011 Pacific Games, the gold medal at the 2013 Pacific Mini Games and the gold medal at the 2015 Pacific Games, lifting a total of 302 kg. He participated at the 2014 Commonwealth Games in the 77 kg event. Shortly after competing, Udia was acquitted in a case of sexual assault.

== Major competitions ==
Year	Venue	Weight	Snatch (kg)				Clean & Jerk (kg)				Total	Rank
Year	Venue	Weight	1	2	3	Rank	1	2	3	Rank	Total	Rank
Commonwealth Games
2014	Glasgow, Scotland	77 kg	120	125	~~129~~	—N/a	155	163	~~170~~	—N/a	288	9
