= Baklai Temengil =

Palauan politician (born 1966)

Minister of Community and Cultural Affairs
- Incumbent
- Assumed office February 2013

Vice President of Oceania National Olympic Committees
- Incumbent
- Assumed office 2017

Personal details
- Born: Joyleen Baklai Temengil; 23 October 1966 (age 58)
- Occupation: Politician

Joyleen Baklai Temengil (born 23 October 1966) is a Palauan politician who is the current Minister of Community and Cultural Affairs. In 2017, she became a member of the International Olympic Committee and the first woman vice president of Oceania National Olympic Committees.

== Early life and education ==
Baklai Temengil was born on 23 October 1966. She completed sports training at the Australian Institute of Sports and the International Olympic Committee. Alternatively, Temengil was instructed in diplomacy by the Ministry of State in Palau.

== Career ==
At the start of her career, Temengil was an administrator in Palau and the United States. She originally started in administration for the Public Auditor in Palau from 1987 to 1989 before moving to work in Washington, D.C. After working in liaison until 1995, Temengil moved back to Palau to become an admin assistant for Palau's vice president until 1997.

Succeeding her career in administration, Temengil participated in canoeing events at the 1998 Micronesian Games and 1999 South Pacific Games representing Palau. Temengil subsequently led Palau's Olympic team at the 2000 Summer Olympics. Furthermore, Temengil competed at the 2011 Pacific Games in outrigger canoeing.

Outside of her athletic career, Temengil began her political career in 2001 when she was elected to the Palau National Olympic Committee as secretary general. In 2013, Temengil was named Palau's minister of Community and Cultural Affairs. In April 2017, Temengil became the first woman to become vice president of the Oceania National Olympic Committees. The same year, she was elected onto the International Olympic Committee.
