= Weightlifting at the 2014 Commonwealth Games – Women's 75 kg =

Weightlifting – Women's 75 kg at the 2014 Commonwealth Games
- Venue: Clyde Auditorium
- Dates: 29 July 2014
- Competitors: 9 from 9 nations
- Winning total weight: 250 kg

Medalists
gold medal	Marie-Ève Beauchemin-Nadeau	Canada
silver medal	Mary Opeloge	Samoa
bronze medal	Apolonia Vaivai	Fiji

The Women's 75 kg weightlifting event at the 2014 Commonwealth Games took place on 29 July at 15:30. The event took place at the Clyde Auditorium in Glasgow, Scotland. The weightlifter from Canada won the gold, with a combined lift of 250 kg.

== Result ==
The final standing of the competitors was as follows:

Rank	Athlete	Snatch (kg)				Clean & Jerk (kg)				Total (kg)
Rank	Athlete	1	2	3	Result	1	2	3	Result	Total (kg)
1st place, gold medalist(s)	Marie-Ève Beauchemin-Nadeau (CAN)	101	105	110	110	133	137	140 GR	140	250 GR
2nd place, silver medalist(s)	Mary Opeloge (SAM)	104	109	~~112~~	109	134	~~138~~	~~141~~	134	243
3rd place, bronze medalist(s)	Apolonia Vaivai (FIJ)	90	94	97	97	112	~~115~~	~~115~~	112	209
4	Mercy Brown (ENG)	~~91~~	91	~~94~~	91	~~112~~	~~112~~	112	112	203
5	Kylie Lindbeck (AUS)	84	88	92	92	~~105~~	~~105~~	105	105	197
6	Dora Abotsi (GHA)	82	85	88	88	97	101	104	104	192
7	Bailey Rogers (NZL)	~~75~~	~~75~~	75	75	100	~~105~~	~~106~~	100	175
8	Tiaterenga Kaua (KIR)	~~65~~	65	71	71	71	75	80	80	151
9	Malia Vea (NIU)	45	50	~~56~~	50	65	70	~~76~~	70	120
