= 2017 Commonwealth Weightlifting Championships =

- Host city: Gold Coast, Australia
- Dates: 4–9 September 2017
- Main venue: Gold Coast Sports and Leisure Centre

The 2017 Commonwealth Weightlifting Championships were held at the Gold Coast Sports and Leisure Centre in Gold Coast, Australia from 4 to 9 September 2017.

The event was held in tandem with that year's Oceania Championships and as a test event for the 2018 Commonwealth Games, for which gold medallists (totals only) in eligible weight categories would directly qualify.

Results shown below are for the senior competition only. Junior and youth results are cited here and here respectively.

== Medal table ==
* Host nation (Australia)

Rank	Nation	Gold	Silver	Bronze	Total
1	India	5	4	5	14
2	Samoa	2	4	1	7
3	Papua New Guinea	2	1	1	4
4	Fiji	2	0	0	2
5	Malaysia	1	1	1	3
6	New Zealand	1	0	2	3
7	Seychelles	1	0	0	1
7	Solomon Islands	1	0	0	1
7	Wales	1	0	0	1
10	Australia*	0	3	2	5
11	Pakistan	0	2	0	2
12	Sri Lanka	0	1	2	3
13	Canada	0	0	1	1
13	England	0	0	1	1
Totals (14 entries)		16	16	16	48

== Medal summary ==
=== Men ===
Event	Gold		Silver		Bronze	
56 kg	Azroy Hazalwafie; Malaysia	253 kg	Chaturanga Lakmal; Sri Lanka	247 kg	Gururaja; India	246 kg
62 kg	Morea Baru; Papua New Guinea	282 kg	Talha Talib; Pakistan	272 kg	Mohd Zaidi Nordin; Malaysia	270 kg
69 kg (Note: Mohd Hafifi Mansor of Malaysia, who lifted 307 kg for gold, tested positive for oxymetholone and was subsequently disqualified.)	Vaipava Ioane; Samoa	296 kg	Deepak Lather; India	295 kg	Indika Dissanayake; Sri Lanka	289 kg
77 kg	Sathish Sivalingam; India	320 kg	Abdul Mubin Rahim; Malaysia	310 kg	François Etoundi; Australia	306 kg
85 kg	Ragala Venkat Rahul; India	351 kg	Don Opeloge; Samoa	332 kg	Alex Bellemarre; Canada	312 kg
94 kg	Steven Kari; Papua New Guinea	352 kg	Siaosi Leuo; Samoa	341 kg	Vikas Thakur; India	340 kg
105 kg	Pardeep Singh; India	342 kg	Sanele Mao; Samoa	341 kg	Ridge Barredo; Australia	331 kg
+105 kg	Lauititi Lui; Samoa	395 kg	Muhammad Nooh Dastgir Butt; Pakistan	389 kg	Gurdeep Singh; India	371 kg

=== Women ===
Event	Gold		Silver		Bronze	
48 kg	Saikhom Mirabai Chanu; India	189 kg	Thelma Toua; Papua New Guinea	153 kg	Dinusha Gomes; Sri Lanka	149 kg
53 kg	Khumukcham Sanjita Chanu; India	195 kg	Santoshi Matsa; India	194 kg	Dika Toua; Papua New Guinea	185 kg
58 kg	Jenly Tegu Wini; Solomon Islands	196 kg	Erika Yamasaki; Australia	180 kg	Saraswati Rout; India	179 kg
63 kg	Clementina Agricole; Seychelles	200 kg	Seen Lee; Australia	199 kg	Vandna Gupta; India	197 kg
69 kg	Apolonia Vaivai; Fiji	227 kg	Punam Yadav; India	217 kg	Sarah Davies; England	212 kg
75 kg	Laura Hughes; Wales	203 kg	Seema; India	202 kg	Bailey Rogers; New Zealand	199 kg
90 kg	Eileen Cikamatana; Fiji	243 kg	Kaity Fassina; Australia	228 kg	Tracey Lambrechs; New Zealand	219 kg
+90 kg	Laurel Hubbard; New Zealand	273 kg	Iuniarra Sipaia; Samoa	250 kg	Feagaiga Stowers; Samoa	243 kg

Medal reallocation
