= Danielle Tungane Cochrane =

Danielle Tungane Cochrane is a Cook Islands public servant. In 2018 she was formally named acting Secretary of Education; she had been serving in an acting capacity since 2017 after Gail Townsend joined UNESCO. Cochrane, a native of Aitutaki, taught at Tangaroa College for some years, but returned to the Cook Islands in 2008 to become a curriculum advisor in the Ministry of Education. She briefly worked in human resources for Air Rarotonga, but returned to the Ministry in 2012 as Planning and Development Director. She also serves on the Cook Islands National Commission for UNESCO. Cochrane is also an active canoeist, and was a member of the team representing the Cook Islands at the 2011 Pacific Games.
