= Boxing at the Pacific Games =

Boxing competitions

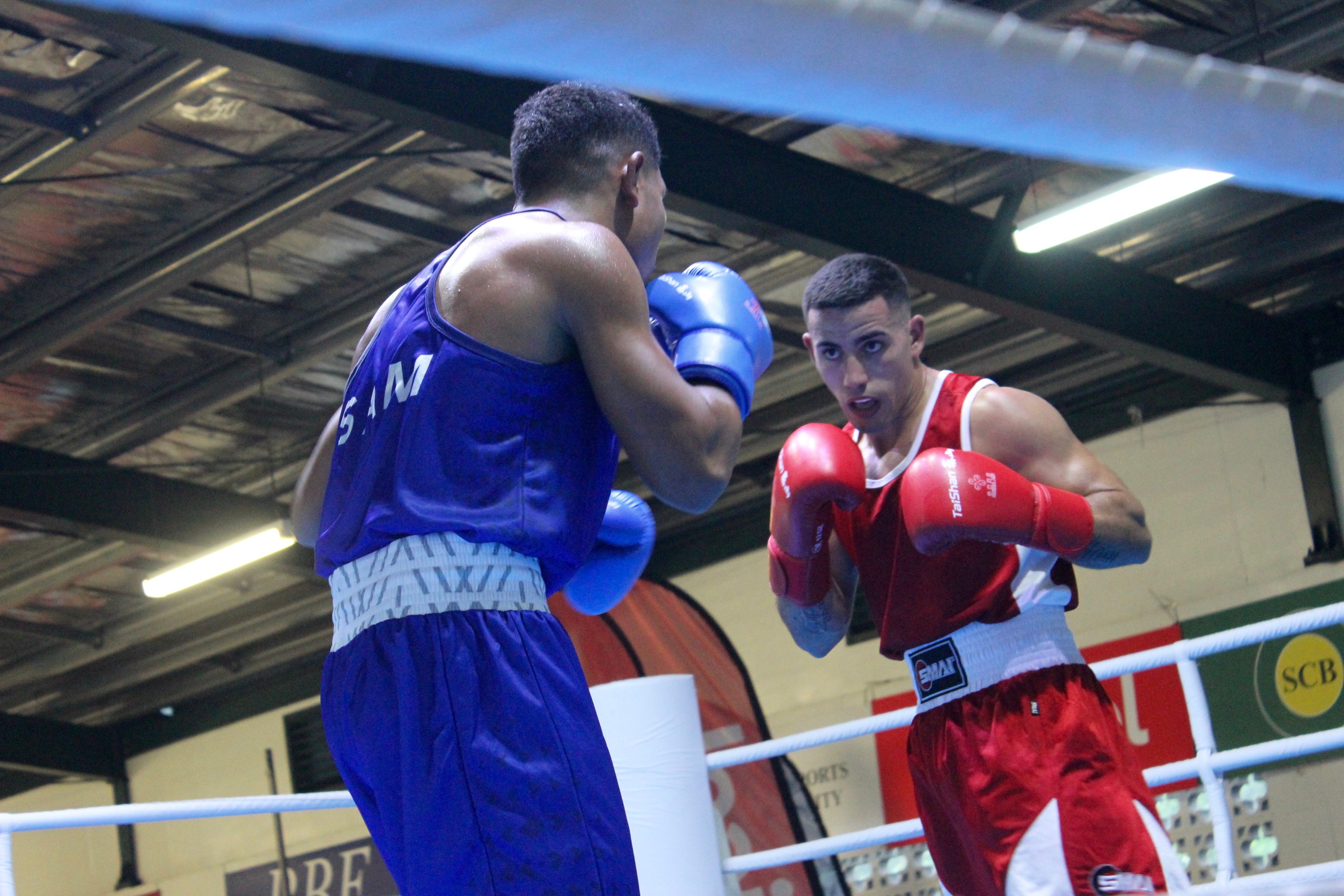
Jancen Poutoa of Samoa (in blue) fighting Ramses Thimoumi of New Caledonia in Salelologa, Samoa for the men's middleweight gold medal at the 2019 Pacific Games.

Boxing at the Pacific Games has been contested since 1963 when it was included as one of ten sports at the inaugural games held in Suva, Fiji. The Pacific Games was known as the South Pacific Games prior to 2011.

The weight classes used for the Pacific Games are in accordance with International Boxing Association (IBA) classifications.

Boxing has also been included in many of the Pacific Mini Games, starting with the first edition held at Honiara in 1981.

== Editions ==
Games	Year	Host city	Host country	Best nation
I	1963	Suva	Fiji	Fiji
II	1966	Nouméa	New Caledonia	Fiji
III	1969	Port Moresby	(Territory of Papua and New Guinea) Papua and New Guinea	Fiji
IV	1971	Pirae	French Polynesia	Western Samoa
V	1975	Tumon	Guam	Western Samoa
VI	1979	Suva	Fiji	Western Samoa
VII	1983	Apia	Western Samoa	Western Samoa
VIII	1987	Nouméa	New Caledonia	French Polynesia
IX	1991	Port Moresby	Papua New Guinea	Papua New Guinea
X	1995	Pirae	Tahiti	Papua New Guinea
XI	1999	Santa Rita	Guam	Papua New Guinea
XII	2003	Suva	Fiji	Samoa
XIII	2007	Apia	Samoa	Samoa
XIV	2011	Nouméa	New Caledonia	French Polynesia
XV	2015	Port Moresby	Papua New Guinea	Papua New Guinea
XVI	2019	Apia	Samoa	Samoa
XVII	2023	Honiara	Solomon Islands	Papua New Guinea
XVIII	2027	Papeete	Tahiti	TBD

== Summary ==
The boxing weight classes contested at each Pacific Games are listed in the table below. Flag icons and three letter country code indicate the nationality of the gold medal winner of an event, where this information is known; otherwise an (X) is used. An Olympic Qualifier is designated (OQ) instead of using a flag icon where the event was not counted in the official Pacific Games medal tally. Selecting or hovering over a country code with a dotted underline will reveal the name of the event winner. A dash (–) indicates a weight division that was not contested. (Note: The number of weight classes used by the AIBA has changed over the years and the definition of each class has also changed several times. – See: Boxing at the Summer Olympics.)

=== Men ===
Games	Year	Host city	Weight class														Medal events	Ref
Games	Year	Host city	Mini- mum	Light- Fly	Fly	Bantam	Feather	Light	Light- Welter	Welter	Light- Middle	Middle	Light- Heavy	Cruiser	Heavy	Super- Heavy	Medal events	Ref
			–	48 kg	51 kg	54 kg	57 kg	60 kg	63.5 kg	67 kg	71 kg	75 kg	81 kg	–	81+ kg	–		
I	1963	Suva	–	–	–	PNG	COK	FIJ	ASM	COK	FIJ	FIJ	FIJ	–	–	–	8	(Note: In 1963, although there were ten weight divisions, medals were only awarded in eight of them. Fiji made the only nominations in the flyweight and heavyweight classes and had put two boxers in each division to ensure a contest. J. Roba and M. Mate in the flyweight, and V. Dikidikiliti and P. Kali in the heavyweight, were awarded silver cups in lieu of medals. Fiji won gold in four weight divisions in 1963, Cook Islands won gold in two (featherweight and welterweight), and Papua New Guinea and American Samoa won one gold medal each.)
II	1966	Nouméa	–	–	FIJ	PNG	PNG	NCL	WSM	WSM	FIJ	FIJ	FIJ	–	NCL	–	10	(Note: Fiji won four weight divisions. New Caledonia, Papua new Guinea and Western Samoa won two each.)
III	1969	Port Moresby	–	–	FIJ	PNG	PNG	ASM	WSM	WSM	FIJ	WSM	FIJ	–	FIJ	–	10	(Note: There were 10 boxing gold medals on offer at the 1969 games. Fiji won 4, Western Samoa won 3, and Papua New Guinea won 2.)
IV	1971	Papeete	–	PNG	WSM	WSM	TAH	TAH	WSM	PNG	TGA	FIJ	WSM	–	TAH	–	11	(Note: In 1971, Western Samoa won four weight classes, French Polynesia won three, PNG two, and Fiji and Tonga one each.)
V	1975	Tumon	–	WSM	WSM	PNG	PNG	ASM	WSM	NHB	ASM	NCL	ASM	–	NCL	–	11	(Note: There were 11 boxing events at the 1975 games. American Samoa and Western Samoa won 3 each, Papua New Guinea and New Caledonia won 2 each, and New Hebrides won 1 (Philip Kating). New Caledonia won the heavyweight and middleweight titles. American Samoa won the light heavyweight title. PNG won the bantamweight and featherweight, and Western Samoa won the flyweight and light flyweight titles.)
VI	1979	Suva	–	PNG	NCL	TAH	ASM	WSM	FIJ	WSM	WSM	PNG	FIJ	–	NCL	–	11	(Note: In 1979, Western Samoa won 3 titles, Fiji, New Caledonia and PNG won 2 each, and American Samoa and Tahiti won 1 each.)
VII	1983	Apia	–	WSM	WSM	ASM	WSM	WSM	WSM	X	X	SOL	TGA	–	WSM	X	12	(Note: In 1983, Western Samoa won 8 of the titles on offer. Tommy Bauro of the Solomon Islands won the gold medal in the middleweight division. Fine Sani of Tonga won gold in the light-heavyweight division. Loi Faaeteete won the heavyweight division for Western Samoa.)
															91 kg	91+ kg		
VIII	1987	Nouméa	–	TAH	TAH	PNG	TAH	SSM	TGA	ASM	ASM	TGA	ASM	–	TAH	–	11	
IX	1991	Port Moresby	–	PNG	PNG	PNG	TGA	PNG	PNG	PNG	ASM	TGA	ASM	–	WSM	TGA	12	
X	1995	Papeete	–	SOL	PNG	PNG	TAH	PNG	PNG	PNG	TGA	TAH	TAH	–	SOL	TGA	12	
XI	1999	Santa Rita	–	PNG	PNG	FIJ	PNG	SAM	TAH	FIJ	NCL	NCL	SAM	–	TAH	TAH	12	
									64 kg	69 kg	–							
XII	2003	Suva	–	PNG	PNG	SAM	TAH	VAN	TAH	VAN	–	FIJ	SAM	–	SAM	FIJ	11	
XIII	2007	Apia	–	PNG	PNG	SAM	SAM	NCL	NCL	SAM	–	SAM	SAM	–	SAM	TAH	11	
			–	49 kg	52 kg	56 kg	–											
XIV	2011	Nouméa	–	PNG	PNG	TAH	–	TAH	TAH	TAH	–	SAM	NCL	–	NCL	NRU	10	
XV	2015	Port Moresby	–				–				–			–			10	
XVI	2019	Salelologa	–				–				–			–			10	
			48 kg	50 kg	51 kg	54 kg	57 kg	60 kg	63.5 kg	67 kg	71 kg	75 kg	80 kg	86 kg	92 kg	92+ kg		
XVII	2023	Honiara	PNG	–	OQ; AUS	PNG	OQ; AUS	FIJ	OQ; AUS	TAH	OQ; AUS	PNG	OQ; AUS	NIU	OQ; SAM	OQ; AUS	6	(Note: More than half of the boxing weight classes contested at the Honiara Games in 2023 were designated as Olympic qualifiers for which Pacific Games medals were not awarded. Australia won most of the Olympic boxing qualifiers, while Papua New Guinea won the most Pacific Games boxing gold medals.)

=== Women ===
Games	Year	Host city	Mini- mum	Light- Fly	Fly	Bantam	Feather	Light	Light- Welter	Welter	Light- Middle	Middle	Light- Heavy	Cruiser	Heavy	Super- Heavy	Medal events	Ref
			–	–	51 kg	–	–	60 kg	–	–	–	75 kg	–	–	–	–		
XV	2015	Port Moresby	–	–	PNG	–	–	FSM	–	–	–	PNG	–	–	–	–	3	(Note: Women's boxing events were included at the Pacific Games for the first time in 2015. The three weight classes as used by the IOC, i.e. flyweight (48–51kg), lightweight (57–60kg), and middleweight (69–75kg) were added to the schedule.)
XVI	2019	Salelologa	–	–	PNG	–	–	FSM	–	–	–	SAM	–	–	–	–	3	
			48 kg	50 kg	52 kg	54 kg	57 kg	60 kg	63.5 kg	67 kg	71 kg	75 kg	81 kg	–	81+ kg	–		
XVII	2023	Honiara	PNG	OQ; AUS	PNG	OQ; AUS	OQ; AUS	OQ; AUS	PNG	OQ; NZL	PNG	OQ; AUS	PNG	–	TAH	–	6	

== Pacific Mini Games ==
The boxing weight classes contested at each Pacific Mini Games are listed in the table below. Flag icons and three letter country code indicate the nationality of the gold medal winner of an event, where this information is known; otherwise an (X) is used. Moving the cursor onto a country code with a dotted underline will reveal the name of the gold medal winner. A dash (–) indicates a weight division that was not contested.

=== Men's boxing ===
Games	Year	Host city	Weight class														Medal events	Ref
Games	Year	Host city	Mini- mum	Light- Fly	Fly	Bantam	Feather	Light	Light- Welter	Welter	Light- Middle	Middle	Light- Heavy	Cruiser	Heavy	Super- Heavy	Medal events	Ref
			–	48 kg	51 kg	54 kg	57 kg	60 kg	63.5 kg	67 kg	71 kg	75 kg	81 kg	–	81+ kg	–		
I	1981	Honiara	–			SOL								–		–	11	
															91 kg	91+ kg		
III	1989	Nuku'alofa	–						TGA					–		–	12	
IV	1993	Port Vila	–	VAN	NCL	PNG	VAN	WSM	SOL	TAH	WSM	WSM	TGA	–	SOL	TGA	12	
V	1997	Pago Pago	–	WSM	VAN	PNG	PNG	WSM	ASM	WSM	WSM	ASM	WSM	–	ASM	WSM	12	
VIII	2009	Rarotonga	–	–	–	TAH	NRU	NCL	TAH	NRU	–	SAM	ASM	–	TAH	TAH	9	(Note: In 2009, although there were ten weight divisions scheduled, medals were only ultimately awarded in nine of them. Only two boxers were entered for the Flyweight 51 kg division. Samoa's Kaisa Ioane was given a walkover when his Cook Islands opponent did not appear for their bout. As no contest took place, no medals could be awarded. Of the remaining nine divisions: one title was won by each of Samoa, American Samoa, and New Caledonia, two titles were won by Nauru, and four titles were won by Tahiti.)
			–	49 kg	52 kg	56 kg	–											
X	2017	Port Vila	–	VAN	VAN	VAN	–	SAM	VAN	TGA	–	VAN	SAM	–	PGC	PGC	10	(Note: In 2017, host nation Vanuatu won five of the ten weight divisions in men's boxing (there were no women's contests scheduled). Tahiti boycotted the Pacific Mini Games due to a dispute over recognition of the French Polynesian Boxing Federation, but some Tahitian boxers competed under the flag of Pacific Games Council (PGC). The PGC team of four boxers won three medals, including gold medals in the heavyweight and super-heavyweight classes.)

== See also ==
- Boxing at the Commonwealth Games
- Boxing at the Summer Olympics
