= Outrigger canoeing at the 2011 Pacific Games =

Canoeing at the 2011 Pacific Games
- Location: Nouméa, New Caledonia
- Dates: 29 August–3 September 2011

Outrigger canoeing at the 2011 Pacific Games in Nouméa, New Caledonia was held on August 29–September 3, 2011.

== Medal summary ==
=== Medal table ===
Rank	Nation	Gold	Silver	Bronze	Total
1	French Polynesia (TAH)	11	1	0	12
2	New Caledonia	1	10	1	12
3	Cook Islands	0	1	3	4
4	Fiji	0	0	3	3
4	Wallis and Futuna	0	0	3	3
6	Samoa	0	0	2	2
Totals (6 entries)		12	12	12	36

=== Men ===
Event	Gold		Silver		Bronze	
V1 500m	Hans Paie Amo; Tahiti	02:15:18	Titouan Puyo; New Caledonia	02:17:36	Jacky Joe Tuakoifenu; Wallis and Futuna	02:20:39
V1 15 km	Titouan Puyo; New Caledonia		Teva Ebb; Tahiti		Joseph Nimarota Amo; Cook Islands	
V6 500m	(French Polynesia) Tahiti	01:56:44	New Caledonia	01:59:19	Wallis and Futuna	02:02:35
V6 1500m	(French Polynesia) Tahiti	07:01:25	New Caledonia	07:12:15	Samoa	07:26:46
V6 30 km	(French Polynesia) Tahiti		New Caledonia		Samoa	
V12 500m	(French Polynesia) Tahiti	01:49:21	New Caledonia	01:51:22	Wallis and Futuna	01:55:28

=== Women ===
Event	Gold		Silver		Bronze	
V1 500m	Hinatea Bernardino; Tahiti	02:29:30	Lovaina Tetuira; New Caledonia	02:39:23	Natalia Evans; Fiji	02:42:38
V1 10 km	Hinatea Bernardino; Tahiti		Lovaina Tetuira; New Caledonia		Pauline Benson; Fiji	
V6 500m	(French Polynesia) Tahiti	02:19:14	New Caledonia	02:24:27	Cook Islands	02:25:47
V6 1500m	(French Polynesia) Tahiti	08:12:25	New Caledonia	08:42:14	Fiji	08:46:43
V6 20 km	(French Polynesia) Tahiti		Cook Islands		New Caledonia	
V12 500m	(French Polynesia) Tahiti	02:06:16	New Caledonia	02:09:01	Cook Islands	02:14:21
