= Niue at the 2011 Pacific Games =

Flag of Niue

Niue competed at the 2011 Pacific Games in Nouméa, New Caledonia between August 27 and September 10, 2011. As of June 28, 2011 Niue has listed 63 competitors.

== Athletics ==
Niue has qualified 1 athlete.

Men

- Michael Juni Jackson

== Bodybuilding ==
Niue has qualified 1 athlete.

Men

- Reagan Ioane

== Canoeing ==
Niue has qualified 6 athletes.

Women

- Stacey Fonga Davis
- Maia Aroha Davis
- Daisy Fealita Halo
- Karyn Misipeka
- Alana Smith
- Shaundell Togiamua

== Golf ==
Niue has qualified 5 athletes.

Men

- James Douglas
- Masiniholo Lagolago
- Tennis Takili Talagi
- Jeremy Tolitule

Women

- Sonia Shermaine Kifoto

== Powerlifting ==
Niue has qualified 3 athletes.

Men

- Kurt Mahanitotonu
- Joe Tefua Mahanitotonu
- Daniel Nemani

== Rugby Sevens ==
Niue has qualified a men's team. Each team can consist of a maximum of 12 athletes.

Men

- Luke Murray Gibb
- Zac Makavilitogia
- Uani Rhodes Talagi
- Kenny Akulu
- Tony Pulu
- Ponifasio Dean Kapaga
- Vincent Pihigia
- Rudolf Ainuu
- Shaun Danny Atamu
- Daniel Vilikoka Camira Makaia
- Leonale Bourke

== Shooting ==
Niue has qualified 10 athletes.

- Sione Togiavalu
- Denis Rose Ofa
- Clemencia Sioneholo
- Morgan Magatogia
- Isatose Jr Pope Talagi
- San Juan Talagi
- Tuaitama Talaiti
- Upokoina Tekena Vakaafi
- Clayton Viliamu
- Asaaf Kulkoi Mahakitau

== Table Tennis ==
Niue has qualified 1 athlete.

Men

- Waimanu Pulu

== Volleyball ==
=== Beach Volleyball ===
Niue has qualified a women's team. Each team can consist of a maximum of 2 members.

Women

- Meleta Talaiti
- Liline Morrissey
