= Palau at the 2011 Pacific Games =

27 August 2011 – 10 September 2011
- Competitors: 66 in 7 sports
- Medals Ranked 18th: Gold 0 Silver 1 Bronze 3 Total 4

Pacific Games appearances
- 1999; 2003; 2007; 2011; 2015; 2019; 2023

Palau competed at the 2011 Pacific Games in Nouméa, New Caledonia between August 27 and September 10, 2011. As of June 28, 2011 Palau has listed 66 competitors.

== Athletics ==
Palau has qualified 6 athletes.

Men

- Jersey Lyar
- Leon Mengloi
- Jacques Stills
- John Stills
- Rodman Teltull

Women

- Ruby Gabriel

== Baseball ==
Palau has qualified a team. Each team can have a maximum of 20 athletes.

Men - Team Tournament

- Herman Alfonso
- Avery Amos Olkebai
- Blaluk Conseko Anthony
- Lieb Kubek Bells
- Rodrick Aquino Blanco
- Kalson Dulei
- O'leary Wataru Ise
- Carter Smau Kahue
- Reagan Sidoi
- Melngis Andre Uchel
- L'Amour Lansang Arurang
- Antonio Ngiralmau
- Lantz Ngiramengior
- Royce Elbuchel Sadang
- Raynold Bkudasu Sadang
- Isimang Tillion Smus

== Canoeing ==
Palau has qualified 9 athletes.

Men

- O'Quinn Sakuma

Women

- Pauleen Kumangai
- Pkngey Otobed
- Joyleen Baklai Temengil
- Marina Toribiong
- Debra Ann Toriboing
- Jacqualine Ngirdimau
- Elsei Diane Tellei
- Joy Kukumai Ueki Uong

== Swimming ==
Palau has qualified 2 athletes.

Women

- Osisang Chilton
- Keesha Keane

== Table Tennis ==
Palau has qualified 2 athletes.

Men

- Samuel Saunders
- Dillon Meriang

== Volleyball ==
=== Beach Volleyball ===
Palau has qualified a men's and women's team. Each team can consist of a maximum of 2 members.

Men

- Christopher Carlos
- Kingsley Ngirmidol

Women

- Holly Yamada
- Hila Asanuma

== Weightlifting ==
Palau has qualified 2 athletes.

Men

- Patris Stevick - -62 kg Clean & Jerk, -62 kg Snatch, -62 kg Total
- Dmitri Villanueva
