= Hapilyn Iro =

Solomon Islands weightlifter

Personal information
- Full name: Hapilyn Iro
- Born: 15 April 1992 (age 34)
- Weight: 67.65 kg (149.1 lb)

Sport
- Country: Solomon Islands
- Sport: Weightlifting
- Team: National team
- Updated on 6 September 2016

Hapilyn Iro (born 15 April 1992) is a Solomon Islands female weightlifter, competing in the 69 kg category and representing Solomon Islands at international competitions. She competed at world championships, most recently at the 2011 World Weightlifting Championships.

== Major results ==
Year	Venue	Weight	Snatch (kg)				Clean & Jerk (kg)				Total	Rank
Year	Venue	Weight	1	2	3	Rank	1	2	3	Rank	Total	Rank
World Championships
2011	Paris, France	69 kg	72	77	80	33	92	~~98~~	98	32	178	32
Pacific Mini Games
2013	Mata-Utu, Wallis and Futuna	63 kg	?	?	?	---	?	?	?	---	157	2nd place, silver medalist(s)
