= Darwin Entertainment Centre =

Australian concert venue

Coordinates: 12°27′38″S 130°50′11″E

AANT Centre
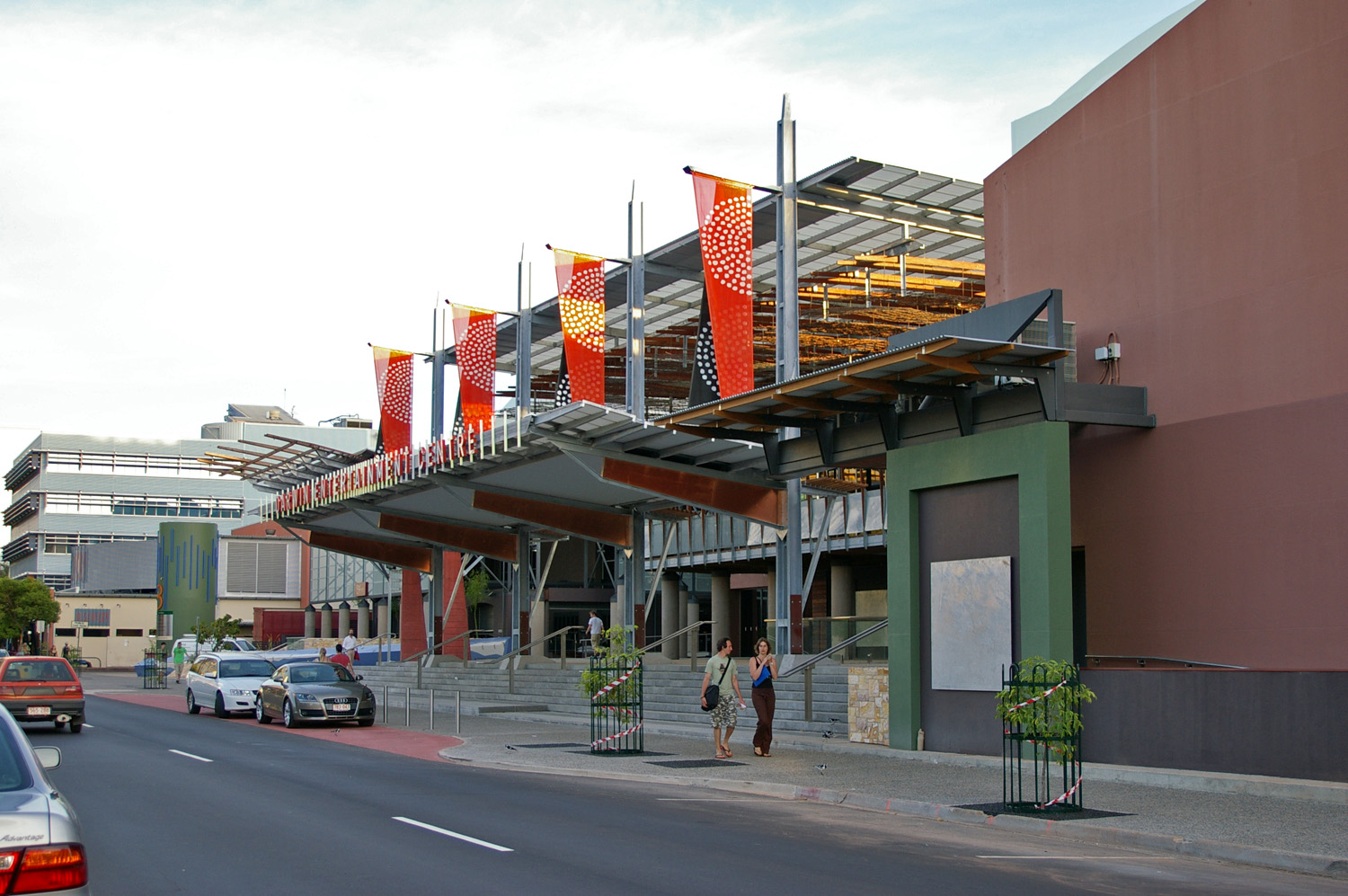
- Interactive map of AANT Centre
- Location: 93 Mitchell Street, Darwin, Northern Territory
- Capacity: 1,054
- Current use: musicals, concerts, local performances

Construction
- Opened: 1986

Website
- www.yourcentre.com.au

The AANT Centre is the city's main concert venue and hosts theatre and orchestral performances in Darwin, Australia. The centre is located in the Heart of Darwin's central business district. The Darwin Symphony Orchestra regularly plays there.

American singer Tina Turner performed at the venue in February 1988 as part of her Break Every Rule World Tour.

== History ==
AANT Centre, then known as Darwin Performing Arts Centre and later as Darwin Entertainment Centre, was built during the 1980s and was Opened by the Administrator of the Northern Territory in 1986. The AANT Centre is the premier entertainment and convention venue in Darwin, Australia. The AANT Centre is located in the city's entertainment district of Mitchell Street.

== Building ==
AANT Centre houses two theatres including a Playhouse which is a traditional proscenium arch theatre seating more than 1000 people and a Studio Theatre which is a smaller theatre seating more than 290 people. There is also an Exhibition Gallery and Rehearsal Room.

The centre has many performances and has played host to major national and international acts as well as local artists, local Eisteddfod competitions, and school concerts.
