= Palau National Olympic Committee =

National Olympic Committee

- Country: Palau
- Code: PLW
- Recognized: 1999
- Continental Association: ONOC
- President: Frank Kyoto
- Secretary General: Baklai Temengil
- Website: www.palaunoc.sportingpulse.net

The Palau National Olympic Committee (IOC code: PLW) is the National Olympic Committee representing Palau.

Palau has appeared at each Summer Olympics beginning in 2000, but has never participated in the Winter Olympics.

As of 2025, Frank Kyota serves as president of the committee while Baklai Temengil serves as secretary general. Temmy Shmull is a notable former vice president of the committee.

It organises the Belau Games.

== See also ==
- Palau at the Olympics
