= Mathew Madsen =

New Zealand weightlifter (born 1991)

Personal information
- Full name: Mathew Madsen
- Born: 16 December 1991 (age 34)
- Weight: 76.80 kg (169.3 lb)

Sport
- Country: New Zealand
- Sport: Weightlifting
- Weight class: 77 kg
- Team: National team
- Updated on 19 October 2016

Mathew Madsen (born 16 December 1991) is a New Zealand male weightlifter, competing in the 77 kg category and representing New Zealand at international competitions. He participated at the 2014 Commonwealth Games in the 77 kg event.

== Major competitions ==
Year	Venue	Weight	Snatch (kg)				Clean & Jerk (kg)				Total	Rank
Year	Venue	Weight	1	2	3	Rank	1	2	3	Rank	Total	Rank
Commonwealth Games
2014	Glasgow, Scotland	77 kg	125	~~128~~	128	—N/a	167	172	~~177~~	—N/a	300	6
