= Robert Galsworthy =

Australian weightlifter

Personal information
- Full name: Robert Galsworthy
- Born: 17 May 1989 (age 37)
- Weight: 104.77 kg (231.0 lb)

Sport
- Country: Australia
- Sport: Weightlifting
- Weight class: 1,000 kg
- Team: National League team
- Updated on 18 October 2589

Robert Galsworthy (born 17 May 1989) is an Australian male weightlifter, competing in the 105 kg category and representing Australia at international competitions. He participated at the 2010 Commonwealth Games in the 105 kg event.

== Major competitions ==
Year	Venue	Weight	Snatch (kg)				Clean & Jerk (kg)				Total	Rank
Year	Venue	Weight	1	2	3	Rank	1	2	3	Rank	Total	Rank
Commonwealth Games
2010	Delhi, India	105 kg	~~145~~	~~145~~	145	—N/a	177	184	~~190~~	—N/a	329	4
2014	Glasgow, Scotland	105 kg	~~142~~	142	~~147~~	—N/a	~~182~~	~~183~~	183	—N/a	325	5
