= Kiribati at the 2011 Pacific Games =

Sporting event delegation

Flag of Kiribati

Kiribati competed at the 2011 Pacific Games in Nouméa, New Caledonia between August 27 and September 10, 2011. As of June 28, 2011, Kiribati had listed 74 competitors.

== Athletics ==
Kiribati has qualified 3 athletes.

Men

- Raobu Tarawa

Women

- Kaingauee David
- Taatia Riino

== Badminton ==
Kiribati has qualified 2 athletes.

Men

- Riteti Mannarara

Women

- Tinabora Tekeiaki

== Boxing ==
Kiribati has qualified 7 athletes.

Men

- Kautoa Roddy
- Ratu Teanti
- Kaotinrerei Tebakatu
- Andrew Kometa
- Ataniraoi Ioteba
- Tarieta Ruata - -91 kg
- Kiaen Buakaua

== Football ==
Kiribati has qualified a men's team. Each team can consist of a maximum of 21 athletes.

Men

- Tarariki Tarotu
- Tiaon Miika
- Kaake Kamta
- Enri Tenukai
- Nabaruru Batiri
- Antin Nanotaake
- Jeff Jong
- Joseph Yan
- Beniamina Kaintikuaba
- Karotu Bakaane
- Martin Miriata
- Biitamatang Keakea
- Tongarua Akori

== Powerlifting ==
Kiribati has qualified 1 athlete.

Men

- Ioane Marae

== Surfing ==
Kiribati has qualified 1 athlete.

Men

- Nicholas McDermott

== Tennis ==
Kiribati has qualified 2 athletes.

Men

- Tabera Bonteman
- Tebatibunga Tito

== Weightlifting ==
Kiribati has qualified 2 athletes.

Men

- Toromon Tekenibeia - -77 kg Snatch, -77 kg Clean & Jerk, -77 kg Total
- Bob Kabuati
