= Nauru at the 2011 Pacific Games =

Flag of Nauru

Nauru competed at the 2011 Pacific Games in Nouméa, New Caledonia between August 27 and September 10, 2011. As of June 28, 2011 Nauru has listed 69 competitors.

== Athletics ==
Nauru has qualified 16 athletes.

Men

- Kevin Baui
- Joseph Sorian Dabana
- Junior Dagearo
- Agassi Jones
- Joshua Jeremiah
- Jimmy John Harris
- Quaski Itaia
- A-One Tannang
- Francis Togagae
- John-Rico Togagae

Women

- Vashti Agege
- Lovelite Detenamo
- Angelina Grundler
- Nina Grundler
- Myshine Raidinen
- Kara Thoma

== Boxing ==
Nauru has qualified 9 athletes.

Men

- Blanco Wharton - -52 kg
- DJ Maaki
- Colan Caleb - -60 kg
- Freeman Tokataake
- Joseph Deireragea - -69 kg
- Santana Halstead - -75 kg
- Olanjo Dagagio
- Tridence Duburiya - -91 kg
- Jake Ageidu - 91 kg and Over

== Judo ==
Nauru has qualified 5 athletes.

Men

- Tomwell Raidinen
- Raymiz Dageago
- Sled-Tavaoe Dowabobo
- O'brien Aboubo
- Joseph Iga

== Powerlifting ==
Nauru has qualified 8 athletes.

Men

- Awama Johnson Aemoge - -74 kg
- Renack Mau - -83 kg
- Raboe Roland - -93 kg
- Greg Garoa - -105 kg
- Joash Teabuge - -105 kg
- Gabriel Akua
- Jesse Jeremiah - -120 kg
- Jezza Uepa - 120 kg & Over

== Table Tennis ==
Nauru has qualified 7 athletes.

Men

- Sharkey Itaia
- Obrian Itaia
- Juweida Stephen

Women

- Oxyna Gobure
- Serafina Grundler
- Alice Taleka
- Polly Gobure

== Tennis ==
Nauru has qualified 5 athletes.

Men

- Shubers Fritz
- David Detudamo
- Irving Harris

Women

- Vicki Harris
- Angelita Detudamo

== Weightlifting ==
Nauru has qualified 3 athletes.

Men

- Elson Brechtefeld - -56 kg Snatch, -56 kg Clean & Jerk, -56 kg Total
- Deiranauw Bronco - -69 kg Snatch, -69 kg Total, -69 kg Clean & Jerk

Women

- Suzanne Hiram - -48 kg Snatch
