= Stevick Patris =

Palauan weightlifter

Personal information
- Nationality: Palau
- Born: January 17, 1991 (age 35) Koror, Palau
- Height: 1.57 m (5 ft 2 in)
- Weight: 62 kg (137 lb)

Sport
- Sport: Weightlifting
- Event: -62 kg
Medal record
Men's Weightlifting
Representing Palau
Pacific Games
Bronze medal – third place	2011 Nouméa	-62 kg

Stevick Patris (born 17 January 1991 in Koror) is a Palauan weightlifter. He competed at the 2011 Pacific Games in Nouméa, New Caledonia in the men's -62kg weight category. He won the bronze medal lifting a total of 233 kg beating three other competitors, Ramoaka Brown, Tui Moce Tikodelaimatuku and Johnathon Jesse Yuw. He lifted 102 kg in the snatch round which was the third heaviest weight lifted and lifted 131 kg in the clean and jerk round and gave him second in the clean and jerk round and third overall.

In 2012, he competed at the Olympic Games, again in the -62 kg weight division. He finished in 14th place with a total of 234 kg (104 kg in the snatch, 134 kg in the clean and jerk).
