= Vivian Lee (weightlifter) =

Australian weightlifter

Personal information
- Full name: Vivian Lee
- Born: 29 March 1978 (age 48)
- Weight: 47.20 kg (104.1 lb)

Sport
- Country: Australia
- Sport: Weightlifting
- Team: National team
- Updated on 6 September 2016

Vivian Lee (born 29 March 1978) is an Australian weightlifter, competing in the 48 kg category and representing Australia at international competitions. She competed at world championships, most recently at the 2011 World Weightlifting Championships.

== Major results ==
Year	Venue	Weight	Snatch (kg)				Clean & Jerk (kg)				Total	Rank
Year	Venue	Weight	1	2	3	Rank	1	2	3	Rank	Total	Rank
World Championships
2011	Paris, France	48 kg	~~62~~	62	~~66~~	20	82	~~87~~	~~87~~	20	144	21
