= Federated States of Micronesia at the 2011 Pacific Games =

Flag of Micronesia

Micronesia competed at the 2011 Pacific Games in Nouméa, New Caledonia, between August 27 and September 10, 2011. As of June 28, 2011, Micronesia has listed 24 competitors.

== Athletics ==
Micronesia has qualified 1 athlete.

Men

- John Howard

== Basketball ==
Micronesia has qualified a men's team. Each team can consist of a maximum of 12 athletes.

Men

- Kilafwa Palik
- Kelvin Simram Sam
- Horrace Richard Salik
- Tarrence Lee Kibby
- David Taulung
- Kelly Tobin
- Edy Nifon
- Yoshiro Alokoa
- Paul Hein
- Harry Elley
- Shrew K. Jerry
- Kezin Karry Lotte Jr

== Swimming ==
Micronesia has qualified 2 athletes.

Men

- Kerson Hadley

Women

- Danisha Paul

== Weightlifting ==
Micronesia has qualified 2 athletes.

Men

- Manuel Minginfel - -62 kg Clean & Jerk, -62 kg Snatch, -62 kg Total
- Jesse Yuw Johnathon
