= Faavae Faauliuli =

Samoan weightlifter

Faavae Faauliuli is a weightlifter from Samoa. He won Samoa's first ever gold medal at the Commonwealth Games when he successfully lifted 334 kg in the New Delhi Games in 2010. He was subsequently rewarded with US$21,000 by the Samoan Government. He subsequently competed in Glasgow.
