= Maria Liku =

Fijian weightlifter

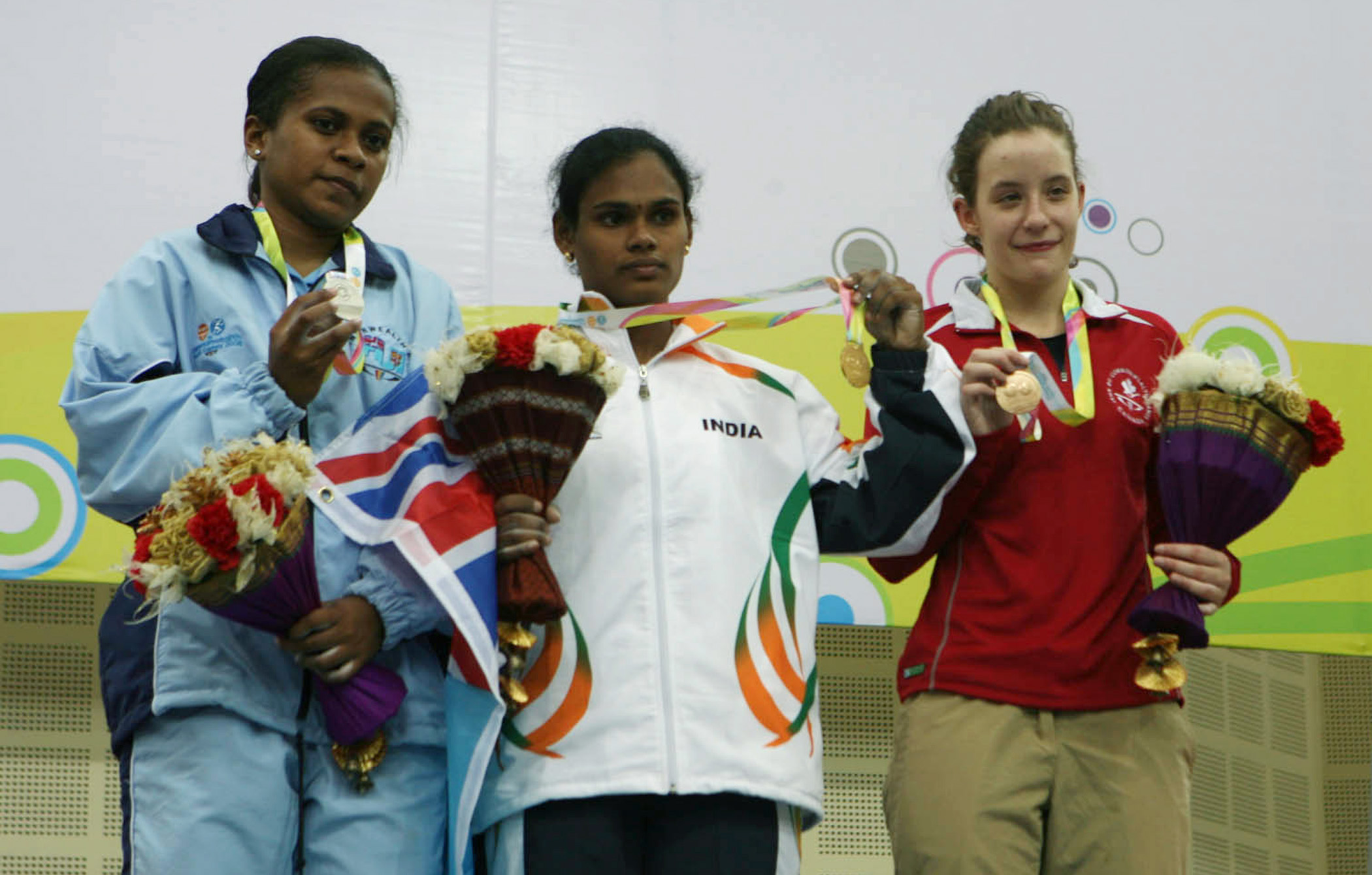
- (left)

Personal information
- Born: April 27, 1990 (age 36)
- Height: 1.58 m (5 ft 2 in)
- Weight: 63 kg (139 lb)

Sport
- Country: Fiji
- Sport: Weightlifting
- Event: 58kg
Medal record
Women's Weightlifting
Representing Fiji
Pacific Games
Gold medal – first place	2011 Nouméa	-58 kg
- Updated on 7 August 2012

Maria Liku (born 27 April 1990 in Levuka) is a Fijian weightlifter who represented Fiji at the 2012 Summer Olympics. In the Women's 63 kg event, she ranked at 6.
