= Cook Islands at the 2011 Pacific Games =

- Flag of the Cook Islands
- IOC code: COK
- NOC: Cook Islands Sports and National Olympic Committee

in Nouméa, New Caledonia 27 August 2011 – 10 September 2011
- Medals Ranked 9th: Gold 2 Silver 6 Bronze 4 Total 12

Pacific Games appearances
- 1963; 1966; 1969; 1971; 1975; 1979; 1983; 1987; 1991; 1995; 1999; 2003; 2007; 2011; 2015; 2019; 2023

Flag of Cook Islands

Cook Islands competed at the 2011 Pacific Games in Nouméa, New Caledonia between 27 August and 10 September 2011. As of 28 June 2011 Cook Islands has listed 212 competitors.

== Athletics ==
Cook Islands has qualified 2 athletes.

Women

- Patricia Taea
- Tereapii Tapoki

== Bodybuilding ==
Cook Islands has qualified 5 athletes.

Men

- Teinaki Rasmussen
- Dean Teiho
- Okirua Jonathan Enoka
- Daniel Tupou Ahau
- Aaron Enoka

== Boxing ==
Cook Islands has qualified 3 athletes.

Men

- Rei Marcus Jack
- Etu Iorangi - -75 kg
- Osolai Kolbe Akai

== Canoeing ==
Cook Islands has qualified 20 athletes.

Men

- Joseph Nimarota Amo - V1 15 km
- Tungane Manuel
- Roland Tamatoa Maru
- John Taulu
- Allister Webb
- George Andre Tutaka
- Tamati Iro
- Marona Mita

Women

- Paulina Beddoes - V6 20 km, V6 500m
- Tara Cummings - V6 20 km, V6 500m
- Anne Patricia Fisher - V6 20 km, V6 500m
- Vaea Melvin - V6 20 km, V6 500m
- Tuangaru Jean Rimatuu - V6 20 km, V6 500m
- Emilene Teuila Taulu - V6 500m
- Teokotai Cummings - V6 20 km
- Myland Tungata Lane
- Tepori Elizabeth Tama
- Christine Joy Thomas
- Danielle Tungane Cochrane
- Joyce Fortes

== Football ==
Cook Islands has qualified a men's and women's team. Each team can consist of a maximum of 21 athletes.

Men

- Tony Lloyd Jamieson
- John Pareanga
- Nathan Yomsaung Tisam
- Roger Tereapii Manuel
- John Quijano
- Allan Hans Boere
- Joseph Bryant Hamilton Ngauora
- Grover Zinedine Harmon
- Campbell Best
- Nikorima Te Miha
- Taylor Andrew Marsters Saghabi
- Paul Branden Taura Turepu
- Nicholas Akavi Funnell
- Mii Tamariki Joseph
- Tahiri Elikana
- Geongsa Tuka Tisam
- Anonga Nardu Tisam
- Ngatokorua Elikana

Women

- Tekura-O-Tane Tutai
- Courtney Napa
- Upokotea Diane Manuela
- Natasha Dean
- Elizabeth Poea Harmon
- Mama Henry
- Leiana Shyann Temata
- Marissa Iroa
- Josephine Clark Turepu
- Jennifer Akavi
- Hurata Saramata Takai
- Louisa Manico
- Tepaeru Helen Toka
- Dayna Victoria Napa
- Mii Yvonne Piri
- Tekura Kaukura
- Marjorie Toru
- Aketuke Linade Unuka

== Golf ==
Cook Islands has qualified 8 athletes.

Men

- Royle Brogan
- Sonny Teokotai Raemaki
- Kirk Tuaiti
- Daniel Webb

Women

- Tania Karati
- Maria Kenning
- Tuaine Elaine Marsters
- Priscilla Elmay Viking - Individual Tournament

== Sailing ==
Cook Islands has qualified 6 athletes.

- Peter Taua Elisa Henry - Laser Men Team
- Grand Junior David Charlie Poiri - Laser Men Team
- Tanus Keeanu Henry
- Aquila Tatira
- Helema William - Laser Women, Laser Women Team
- Teau Moana McKenzie - Laser Women Team, Laser Women

== Squash ==
Cook Islands has qualified 7 athletes.

Men

- Marlon Torres Manlangit - Team Tournament
- Josia Taio - Team Tournament
- Lyall Tom Marsters - Team Tournament
- Tuakeu Tuakeu - Team Tournament
- Manu Priest - Team Tournament
- Ianis Boaza

Women

- Christine Ina Hunter

== Rugby Sevens ==
Cook Islands has qualified a women's team. Each team can consist of a maximum of 12 athletes.

Women

- Nooroa Maui
- Maggie Toka
- Jamie Kowhai Gotty
- Awhitia Pepe
- Princess Mary Adams
- Margaret Teremoana
- Nareta Marsters
- Julie Ann Taripo
- Vanya Tou
- Teivanui Maui
- Vaine Ben
- Edith Micholas
- Monique Moeara

== Tennis ==
Cook Islands has qualified 2 athletes.

Women

- Davina Ashford
- Brittany Teei

== Triathlon ==
Cook Islands has qualified 1 athlete.

Women

- Rangi Apera

== Volleyball ==
=== Beach Volleyball ===
Cook Islands has qualified a men's and women's team. Each team can consist of a maximum of 2 members.

Men

- Brendon Heath
- James Pori

Women

- Tepori Rongokea
- Alanna Smith

== Weightlifting ==
Cook Islands has qualified 3 athletes.

Men

- Samuel Jnr Pera
- Sirla Pera

Women

- Luisa Peters
