= Ele Opeloge =

Samoan weightlifter (born 1985)

Personal information
- Born: July 11, 1985 (age 40) Apia, Samoa
- Height: 1.75 m (5 ft 9 in)
- Weight: 124 kg (273 lb)

Sport
- Country: Samoa
- Sport: Weightlifting
- Event: Women's +75 kg
Medal record
Women's Weightlifting
Representing Samoa
Olympic Games
Silver medal – second place	2008 Beijing	+75 kg
Oceania Weightlifting Championships
Gold medal – first place	2007 Apia	+75 kg
Gold medal – first place	2008 Auckland	+75 kg
Silver medal – second place	2006 Apia	+75 kg
Commonwealth Games
Gold medal – first place	2010 Delhi	+75 kg
Silver medal – second place	2014 Glasgow	+75 kg
Pacific Games
Gold medal – first place	2007 Apia	+75 kg
Gold medal – first place	2011 Nouméa	+75 kg
Gold medal – first place	2015 Port Moresby	+75 kg

Ele Opeloge (born July 11, 1985) is a Samoan weightlifter. She was the first Samoan to win an Olympic medal, winning silver in the women's +75 kg category at the 2008 Beijing Olympic Games.

== Family ==
Opeloge comes from a weightlifting family. Her brother, Niusila is also a Commonwealth gold medalist, winning it the same day as her. Four other relatives have also competed at Commonwealth level. Her twin sister is Larissa Tara. She is the mother of weightlifter Avatu Opeloge.

== Career ==
=== 2007 ===
At the 2007 World Championships she ranked 11th, with a combined lift of 250 kg.

=== 2008 ===
She represented Samoa at the 2008 Summer Olympics in Beijing, competing in the over 75kg category. She was also her country's flagbearer during the Games' opening ceremony.

Opeloge finished fourth in her event, narrowly missing out on a bronze medal. She lifted 269 kg, matching her personal best, while Mariya Grabovetskaya of Kazakhstan lifted 270 kg to finish third. In August 2016, the IWF reported in the IOC reanalysis of the 2008 Beijing Olympics that the silver and bronze medalists - Olha Korobka of Ukraine, and Mariya Grabovetskaya - had failed retests of their doping samples. The IWF later reallocated medals accordingly, elevating Opeloge to become the silver medalist and also the first-ever Olympic medalist from Samoa.

Opeloge is a celebrity in Samoa, "where children approach her in the supermarket for autographs".

=== 2010 ===
Opeloge won a gold at the 2010 Commonwealth Games in New Delhi, India in the +75 kg class with a Games record combined lift of 285 kg. It was also Samoa's second gold medal in the history of the Games.

=== 2012 ===
Opeloge took 5th place in the London Olympics. Her build up to the Olympics were disrupted by chicken pox and typhoid.

=== 2014 ===
Opeloge was the Samoan flagbearer for the 2014 Commonwealth Games, as well as being one of the baton carriers as the Queen's baton made its way through Samoa. At the Games she won the silver medal in the +75 kg category.
