= Tovia Opeloge =

Samoan weightlifter

Personal information
- Full name: Tovia Opeloge
- Born: 27 March 1990 (age 36)
- Weight: 103.81 kg (228.9 lb)

Sport
- Country: Samoa
- Sport: Weightlifting
- Weight class: 105 kg
- Team: National team
- Updated on 18 October 2016

Tovia Opeloge (born 27 March 1990) is a Samoan male weightlifter, competing in the 105 kg category and representing Samoa at international competitions. He won the gold medal at the 2013 Pacific Mini Games. He participated at the 2010 Commonwealth Games in the 105 kg event and at the 2014 Commonwealth Games.

== Major competitions ==
Year	Venue	Weight	Snatch (kg)				Clean & Jerk (kg)				Total	Rank
Year	Venue	Weight	1	2	3	Rank	1	2	3	Rank	Total	Rank
Commonwealth Games
2010	Delhi, India	105 kg	~~135~~	~~135~~	~~135~~	—N/a	---	---	---	—N/a	0	---
2014	Glasgow, Scotland	105 kg	141	146	~~150~~	—N/a	~~184~~	~~184~~	185	—N/a	331	4
