= Niusila Opeloge =

Samoan weightlifter

Personal information
- Born: 23 June 1980 (age 46)

Sport
- Country: Samoa
- Sport: Weightlifting
- Event: Men's 105 kg
Medal record
Men's Weightlifting
Representing Samoa
Commonwealth Games
Gold medal – first place	2010 Delhi	105 kg
Bronze medal – third place	2002 Manchester	85 kg Snatch

Tupuola Niusila Opeloge is a weightlifter from Samoa.

== Family ==
Opeloge comes from a weightlifting family. He and his sister Ele Opeloge are both Commonwealth Games gold medalist weightlifters, both winning their medals on the same day. He is the father of weightlifter Faustina Opeloge.

== Career ==
Opeloge took up weightlifting in 1999. At the 2002 Commonwealth Games in Manchester, England he won a bronze in the 85 kg snatch event. At the 2010 Commonwealth Games, in New Delhi, India he won gold in the 105 kg to give Samoa its third gold medal of the Games. In the process, he also became the first Samoan to win medals in any sport at two Commonwealth Games. Opeloge was suspended in 2007 for two years due to a doping. The use of banned substances in Weightlifting is prohibited and is considered cheating.

Opeloge failed to qualify for the 2012 Summer Olympics.
