= Arafura Games =

Disability sports event in Darwin, Australia

Coordinates: 12°23′57″S 130°53′14″E

- Motto: Meeting of Sporting Neighbours
- Purpose: Mixed competition for able-bodied and disabled athletes
- Frequency: Biannually
- Inaugurated: 1991
- Headquarters: Darwin, Australia
- Website: www.arafuragames.nt.gov.au

The Arafura Games was a multi-sport event where athletes with a disability compete in the same program as able-bodied athletes. Competitors from around the world compete in the week-long games held every 2 years in Darwin, Northern Territory, Australia.

Called a "meeting of Sporting Neighbours", the Arafura Games takes its name from the Arafura Sea, which lies between northern Australia and Southeast Asia. Nations along the Arafura Sea originally formed the basis of the Arafura Games, however in recent years countries from further afield have participated, including United States, England, Brazil and Liechtenstein.

== History ==
First held in 1991. A foundation sport of the Arafura Games, Basketball has grown from a 4 team competition with teams from around the Darwin region to an 8 team international competition with teams from all over the world. The Games were known as the Arafura Sports Festival up until 1997. These Games were the first ever international sporting festival to have Australian Rules Football as an international competition sport in its own right. The International Australian Football Council was formed after the 1995 Games, playing an important role in promoting Aussie Rules until dissolving in 2001.

The Arafura Games were cancelled in 2003 due to concern over the SARS virus. From 2005 onwards, the Arafura Games included events for athletes with physical disabilities. The 2007 Arafura Games received patronage from the International Paralympic Committee (IPC).

In 2011, the Arafura Games incorporated the Oceania Paralympic Championships for the sports of athletics, swimming, powerlifting, and table tennis.

The 2013 Arafura Games was cancelled by the newly elected CLP government on 31 October 2012 as it "costs too much to run".

After an eight-year hiatus, the 2019 Arafura Games were held from 27 April to 4 May 2019.

The 2021 games were postponed until 2023 due to the COVID-19 pandemic, however it was later announced by the then Major Events Minister Natasha Fyles, that all future Arafura Games were to be scrapped.

== Editions ==
All editions were held in Darwin, Australia.

Edition	Year	Dates	Participants	Countries
1	1991			
2	1993			
3	1995			
4	1997			
5	1999			
6	2001	19–26 May	3100	25
–	2003	cancelled		
7	2005	14–21 May		
8	2007	12–19 May		
9	2009	9–16 May		
10	2011	6–14 May		
–	2013	cancelled		
11	2019	27 April–4 May		
–	2021	postponed due to COVID-19		
–	2023	Cancelled and all future events cancelled		

== Basketball ==
Conducted under Federation of International Basketball Associations (FIBA) conditions and Guidelines, Basketball is played at the Darwin Basketball Stadium, Abala Road Marrara, in the Marrara Sporting Complex.

In recent years, USA squad players from university teams dominated the competition. The Northern Territory team have been shaded in the last 4 Arafura Games by the Americans and only their depth on the bench has let them down. The Northern Territory have won the Silver medal in the past 4 Arafura games. 2007 Arafura Games Basketball results:

Gold United States of America: USA Colleges
Silver Northern Territory: Northern Territory
Bronze Australian Indigenous: Australian Indigenous

== Sports ==
- Athletics – including Paralympic athletics and Olympic events
- Badminton (2007, 2009, 2019, 2023)
- Basketball
- Boxing
- Cricket – Twenty20 format
- Field hockey
- Football (soccer) – including Paralympic football events
- Golf
- International lifesaving
- Muay Thai
- Sepak takraw
- Shooting – Clay Target
- Shooting – Pistol (IPSC)
- Shooting – Pistol/Air Rifle (ISSF)
- Squash
- Swimming – including Paralympic swimming events
- Table tennis – including Paralympic table tennis events
- Ten-pin bowling
- Triathlon
- Volleyball
- Weightlifting – including Paralympic powerlifting events
- Water polo

Other sports played at the Arafura Games:

- Netball
- Rugby Union

== Participating countries ==
East Asia

- China
- Hong Kong
- Japan
- South Korea
- North Korea
- Chinese Taipei

South Asia

- Bangladesh
- India
- Pakistan
- Nepal
- Sri Lanka

Central Asia

- Kazakhstan
- Uzbekistan
- Turkmenistan
- Tajikistan
- Kyrgyzstan

SouthEast Asia

- Brunei
- Cambodia
- Indonesia
- Laos
- Malaysia
- Philippines
- Singapore
- Thailand
- Timor-Leste

Oceania/ Pacific

- Australia
- Cook Islands
- Fiji
- Guam
- Nauru
- New Zealand
- Papua New Guinea
- American Samoa
- Samoa
- Tahiti
- Tonga

AUS States/ territories

- Australian Capital Territory
- New South Wales
- Northern Territory
- Queensland
- South Australia
- Tasmania
- Victoria
- Western Australia

AUS Other

- Australian Defence Force
- Indigenous Australians

The Americas

- Argentina
- Bermuda
- Brazil
- Canada
- Colombia
- Mexico
- Trinidad and Tobago
- United States
- Venezuela

The Persian Gulf

- Bahrain
- Iran
- Iraq
- Oman
- Qatar
- Saudi Arabia
- Kuwait
- United Arab Emirates

Europe

- Spain
- United Kingdom
- France
- Germany
- Greece
- Ireland
- Liechtenstein
- Netherlands
- Poland
- Russia
- Ukraine
- Serbia
- Montenegro
- Switzerland
- Sweden

Africa

- Angola
- Cameroon
- Democratic Republic of the Congo
- Republic of the Congo
- Egypt
- Kenya
- Morocco
- Ghana
- Nigeria
- South Africa

== See also ==
- Australian Youth Olympic Festival
- Indigenous Nationals
