= Commonwealth Weightlifting Championships =

International weightlifting competition

The Commonwealth Weightlifting Championships are an international weightlifting competition, open to countries of the Commonwealth of Nations. They are usually held every non-Commonwealth Games year under the auspices of the Commonwealth Weightlifting Federation (often combined with associated continental championships) and serve as a qualifying tournament for the Games themselves.

== Editions ==
The championships have been staged as follows:

Year	Location
1980	Cardiff, Wales
1981	Auckland, New Zealand
1983	Cospicua, Malta
1985	Apia, Samoa
1987	Canberra, Australia
1988	Malta
1992	Auckland, New Zealand
1995	Nauru
1996	Apia, Samoa
1997	Wellington, New Zealand
1998	Nauru
1999	Melbourne, Australia
2000	Nauru
2003	Nukuʻalofa, Tonga
2004	Cospicua, Malta
2005	Melbourne, Australia
2006	Apia, Samoa
2007	Apia, Samoa
2008	Limassol, Cyprus
2009	Penang, Malaysia
2011	Cape Town, South Africa
2012	Apia, Samoa
2013	Penang, Malaysia
2015	Pune, India
2016	Penang, Malaysia
2017	Gold Coast, Australia
2019	Apia, Samoa
2020	Cancelled due to COVID-19 pandemic
2021	Tashkent, Uzbekistan
2023	Greater Noida, India
2024	Suva, Fiji
2025	Ahmedabad, India
