= List of saints from Asia =

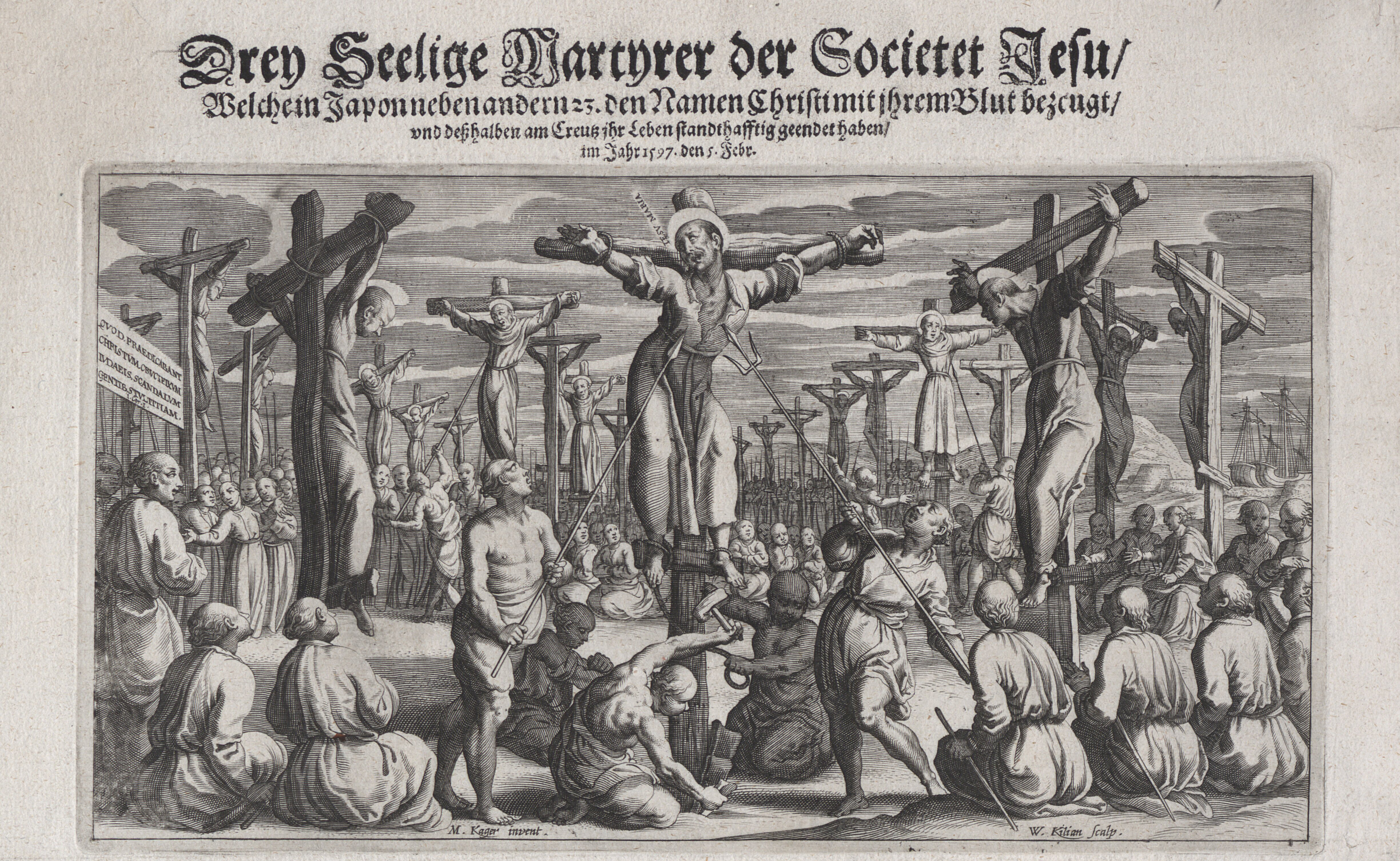
Martyrs of Nagasaki (1628 engraving)

This page is a list of saints, blesseds, venerables, and Servants of God from Asia, as recognized by the Catholic Church. These people were born, died, or lived their religious life in any of the states or territories of Asia.

Since Christianity began in Asia, the first Christians were Asians, and Biblical figures of the Old Testament considered to be saints also spent all or most of their lives in the Holy Land. While Catholicism has waxed and waned in various parts of the continent, it has had a continuous presence there into the twenty-first century.

== Saints in early times ==
Due to the rise of Islam and the schisms leading to the establishment of Nestorian, Oriental Orthodox and Eastern Orthodox churches, the Asian saints of times before the modern era are largely concentrated in the area of the Holy Land and the time of the Roman Empire. Christianity reached as far as China and India. The following is a very partial list of those Asian-connected saints traditionally recognized by Rome.

=== Popes ===
Nine of the early popes are said to have been Asian. Three of these (Popes Constantine, John V, and John VI) have not been traditionally considered saints. The other five are:

- Peter (r. 30–67)
- Evaristus (r. 99–107)
- Anicetus (r. 157–168)
- Theodore I (r. 642–649)
- Gregory III (r. 731–741)

In addition, Pope Sergius I was born to Syrian immigrants living in Sicily.

One pope died in Asia: Pope Agapetus I (r. 535–536).

=== Apostles ===
All the apostles were Asians, and many of them lived and died in Asia.

- Andrew preached the Gospel in Asia Minor.
- Phillip preached in Phrygia, where he suffered martyrdom.
- Bartholomew did missionary activity in the region near Bombay in India. He suffered and died in Armenia.
- James, son of Zebedee was beheaded in Jerusalem
- James, son of Alpheus was the first Bishop of Jerusalem, where he was martyred.
- Thomas the Apostle evangelized parts of Persia and India, where he was martyred.
- Simon preached in Persia, where he was martyred.
- Jude Thaddeus preached in Armenia and Persia, where he was martyred.
- Matthias preached and was martyred in Asia.

=== Doctors ===
Seven of the thirty-seven Doctors of the Church were from Asia, all of them from this time period. They are:

- John Chrysostom (Antioch; in modern-day Turkey was Ancient Greece)
- Basil the Great (Caesarea, Cappadocia; in modern-day Turkey, was Ancient Greece)
- Gregory of Nazianzus (Arianzum, Cappadocia; in modern-day Turkey, was Ancient Greece)
- Cyril of Jerusalem (Caesarea Maritima, Syria Palaestina; in modern-day Israel)
- John of Damascus (Damascus, Bilad al-Sham; in modern-day Syria)
- Ephrem the Syrian (Nisibis; in modern-day Turkey)

=== Writers and theologians ===
Many of the early writers and theologians had connections with Asia. A partial list would include:

- Matthew
- Luke
- John
- Paul
- Polycarp
- Ignatius of Antioch

=== Others ===
In addition to the categories above, these first centuries gave the Church many other saints, among them:

- George (Cappadocia; in modern-day Turkey, was Ancient Greece)
- John Maron (Sirmaniyah or Sarmin; in modern-day Syria)
- Maron (Syria Prima; in modern-day Syria)
- Maximus the Confessor (Haspin, Golan Heights; in modern-day Syria)
- Sabbas the Sanctified (Caesarea, Cappadocia; in modern-day Turkey, was Ancient Greece)
- Pantaenus (lived in India)
- Severus of Vienne (Indian by birth)
- Petroc (lived in India)

== Modern times ==
After the canonization of saints came to be reserved to the Papacy around AD 1000, and especially after the establishment of the Congregation of Rites in 1588, the list of official saints with Asian connections is more clear.

=== List of saints ===
The following is the list of saints, including the year in which they were canonized and the country or countries with which they are associated.

- The Four Martyrs of Thane (d. 1321) (India)
- Francis Xavier, Jesuit priest (1622, China, India, and Japan)
- The 26 Sainted Martyrs of Japan (1862, Japan and India)
- John de Brito, Jesuit priest (1947, India)
- Nikola Tavelić and three companions, Franciscan priests and martyrs (1970, Israel)
- Charbel Makhluf, Maronite priest (1977, Lebanon)
- Maximilian Kolbe, (1982, China, Japan, India)
- The 103 Sainted Korean Martyrs (1984, North Korea and South Korea)
- Lorenzo Ruiz and fifteen companions, martyrs (1987, Japan and Philippines)
- The 117 Vietnamese Martyrs (1988, Vietnam)
- John Gabriel Perboyre, priest of the Congregation of the Mission and martyr (1996, China)
- The 120 Martyr Saints of China (2000, China)
- Mark Ji Tianxing, martyr during the Boxer Rebellion (2000, China)
- Raimundus Li Quanzhen, martyr during the Boxer Rebellion (2000, China)
- Peter Lieou, Layperson (2000, China)
- Anna Wang, martyr during the Boxer Rebellion (2000, China)
- Rafqa Pietra Choboq Ar-Rayès, Maronite nun (2001, Lebanon)
- Joseph Freinademetz, priest of the Society of the Divine Word (2003, China)
- Nimatullah Kassab, Maronite monk (2004, Lebanon)
- Alphonsa of the Immaculate Conception, Franciscan sister (2008, India)
- Pedro Calungsod, lay catechist (2012, Guam/Philippines)
- Kuriakose Elias Chavara, Carmelite priest (2014, India)
- Euphrasia Eluvathingal, Carmelite sister (2014, India)
- Joseph Vaz, Oratorian priest (2015, India and Sri Lanka)
- Mariam Baouardy, Discalced Carmelite (2015, Israel, India)
- Marie-Alphonsine Danil Ghattas, Sister of the Dominican Sisters of the Most Holy Rosary of Jerusalem (2015, Israel)
- Mother Teresa, missionary of charity (2016, India)
- Maria Theresa Chiramel, nun (2019, India)

=== List of blesseds ===
- Denis of the Nativity (Pierre Berthelot) and Redemptus of the Cross (India, Indonesia)
- The 205 Blessed Martyrs of Japan (Japan, Korea, India)
- The Blessed Martyrs of Cuncolim (India)
- The Blessed Martyrs of Songkhon (Thailand and Laos)
- Gabriele Allegra, Franciscan priest (China)
- Andrew of Phú Yên, layman and martyr (Vietnam)
- Vladimir Ghika, priest and martyr (Turkey)
- Khalil al-Haddad, Capuchin priest (Lebanon)
- John Gaspard Cratz, Emmanuel d'Abreu, Bartholomew Alvarez and Vincent da Cunha (Portuguese Empire, Vietnam)
- Thevarparampil Kunjachan, priest (India)
- Nicholas Bunkerd Kitbamrung, priest and martyr (Thailand)
- Isidore Ngei Ko Lat, layman and martyr (Myanmar)
- Salvatore Lilli, Franciscan priest and martyr, and seven companions, laymen and martyrs (Turkey)
- Ignatius Maloyan, archbishop and martyr (Turkey)
- Mary of the Passion, Franciscan Missionary of Mary (India)
- Stephen Nehmé, Maronite monk (Lebanon)
- Maria Assunta Pallotta, Franciscan missionary of Mary (China)
- Paul Yun Ji-chung and 123 companions of the Korean Martyrs (South Korea and China)
- Devasahayam Pillai, layman and martyr (India)
- Manuel Ruiz Lopez and ten companions, Franciscan priests, brothers and laymen, martyrs (Syria)
- Maurice Tornay, Augustinian priest and martyr (China)
- Mario Vergara, PIME priest and martyr (Myanmar)
- Clement Vismara, PIME priest (Myanmar)
- Joseph Thąo Tiěn and 14 companions and Mario Borgaza and Thoj Xyooj Paj Lug, Martyrs of Laos, laymen and priests (Laos)
- Diego Luis de San Vitores, Jesuit priest and martyr (Philippines, Guam)
- Eugenio Sanz-Orozco Mortera, (José María of Manila) Capuchin Priest and Martyr (Philippines)
- Iustus Takayama Ukon, Layperson (Philippines, Japan)
- Sister Rani Maria (Mariam Vattalil), Professed Religious and Martyr (India)

=== List of venerables ===
- Mother Ignacia del Espiritu Santo, foundress of the Religious of the Virgin Mary (Philippines)
- Romano Bottegal, Trappist priest (Lebanon)
- Vincent Cimatti, Salesian priest (Japan)
- Istifan al-Duwayhi, Patriarch of Antioch of the Maronites (Lebanon)
- Anastasius Hartmann, Capuchin priest (India)
- Mathew Kadalikkattil, priest (India)
- Satoko Kitahara, laywoman (Japan)
- Thomas Kurialachery, Eparch of Changanacherry of the Syro-Malabarese (India)
- Sophia Leeves, Discalced Carmelite (Turkey)
- Matteo Ricci, priest of the Society of Jesus (China)
- Béchara Abou Mrad, Basilian Salvatorian priest (Lebanon)
- Fernanda Riva, Canossian sister (India)
- Agnelo de Souza, priest of the Missionary Society of Saint Francis Xavier of Pilar (India)
- Simon Srugi, Salesian brother (Palestine)
- Ladislao Bukowinski, Secular priest (Kazakhstan)
- Mary Jane Wilson, religious of the Franciscan Sisters of Our Lady of Victory (India)
- Zacarias of Saint Teresa, Carmelite priest (India)
- Joseph Vithayathil, priest (India)
- Francesco Convertini, Salesian priest (India)
- Stefano Ferrando, Salesian priest and bishop (India)
- Isabel Larrañaga Ramírez, (Philippines)
- Joaquina Maria Mercedes Barcelo Pages, (Consuelo Barceló) (Philippines)
- Aloysius Schwartz, (Philippines)
- Alfredo Obviar, bishop of Lucena, founder (Philippines)
- María Beatriz del Rosario Arroyo, foundress of the Dominican Sisters of the Most Holy Rosary of the Philippines (Philippines)
- Teofilo Camomot, coadjutor archbishop of Cagayan de Oro, founder of the Daughters of Saint Teresa (Philippines)

=== List of Servants of God ===
- Akash Bashir, security guard, martyr (Pakistan)
- Rita Barceló (Rita Barcelo y Pages) (Philippines)
- Jerónima Yañez de la Fuente, professed religious of the Poor Clare Nuns (Philippines)
- Xu Guangqi, scholar-official, scientist (China)
- Flavian LaPlante, priest of the Congregation of the Holy Cross (Bangladesh)
- Thomas Cooray, cardinal, archbishop of Colombo (Sri Lanka)
- Marcel Nguyễn Tân Văn, Redemptorist lay brother (Vietnam)
- Carlo Braga, professed priest of the Salesians of Don Bosco (Philippines)
- François-Xavier Nguyễn Văn Thuận, bishop, cardinal, president of the Pontifical Council for Justice and Peace (Vietnam)
- Theotonius Amal Ganguly, archbishop of Dhaka (Bangladesh)
- Francesco Palliola, Jesuit priest (Philippines)
- Alfredo Verzosa, bishop of Lipa, titular bishop of Capsa, founder (Philippines)
- Darwin Ramos, layman (Philippines)
- Nicolaas Kluiters, Jesuit priest (Lebanon)
- Fathi Baladi, young layperson of the Archeparchy of Beirut and Byblos of the Melkites; martyr (Lebanon)
- Giovanni Battista Adami, professed priest of the Jesuits; martyr (Japan)
- Giovanni Battista Sidotti, priest of the Archdiocese of Palermo; Apostolic Vicar of Japan and Chōsuke and Haru, laypersons of the Archdiocese of Tokyo; martyrs (Japan)
- Ibrahim Addai Scher and 27 companion martyrs of the Assyrian genocide, archeparchs, eparchs, priests, catechumens, and laypersons of the Archeparchy of Urmia; priests of the Congregation of the Mission (Vincentians); Mmartyrs (Iraq-Iran)
- Cecilia Moshe Hanna, professed religious of the Daughters of the Sacred Heart of Jesus (Chaldeans); martyr (Iraq)
- Ragheed Aziz Ganni, Basman Yousef Daud Al-Yousef, Wahid Hanna Isho, and Gassan Isam Bidawed, priest and subdeacons of the Archeparchy of Mosul of the Chaldeans; martyrs (Iraq)
- Isabelle Abdullah El-Khoury, founder and renovator of the Antonine Sisters (Lebanon)
- Richard Michael Fernando (Richie), professed cleric of the Jesuits; martyr (Philippines-Cambodia)
- Helena Perera [Charithaya], layperson of the Diocese of Chilaw (Sri Lanka)
- Clement Shahbaz Bhatti, married layperson of the Archdiocese of Islamabad-Rawalpindi; martyr (Pakistan)
- Thayr Saidālla Abdāl and 44 companions, priests and layfaithful of the Archeparchy of Baghdad and Beirut of the Syrians; martyrs (Iraq)
- Joseph Chhmar Salas (1937–1977) and 34 companions (d. 1971–78), Bishop of Phnom Penh; priests of the Paris Foreign Mission Society and of the Dioceses from Cambodia along with lay companions from various Apostolic Vicariates (Vietnam, Cambodia)
- Pietro Manghisi (1889–1953), priest of the Pontifical Institute for Foreign Missions; Martyr (Myanmar)
- Ioannes Baptista Yi Byeok and 132 companions (d. 1785–1879), laypeople from the Apostolic Vicariate of South Korea; martyrs (S. Korea-N. Korea)
- Henri (Benoit Thuân) Denis (1880–1933), professed priest of the Cistercians (Holy Family Congregation) (Vietnam)
- Carlo Della Torre (1900–1982), professed priest, Salesians of Don Bosco (Thailand)
- Pierre Lambert de la Motte (1624–1679), founder, Paris Foreign Missions Society, titular bishop of Berytus, apostolic vicar of Cochin (Thailand)

=== Other open causes ===
Others have been proposed for beatification, and may have active groups supporting their causes. These include:

- Paul Xakan Keobunkuang, seminarian of the archdiocese of Thare-Nongseng (Thailand)
- Émile Levrel, priest of the Paris Foreign Missions Society (Thailand)
- Louis Heimo, priest of the Society of the Auxiliaries of the Missions (Thailand)
- Gerard A. Donovan, Maryknoll priest and martyr (China)
- Richardus Kardis Sandjaja, priest and martyr (Indonesia)

== See also ==
- Roman Catholicism in Asia
- List of American saints and beatified people
- List of Filipino Saints, Blesseds, and Servants of God
- Catholic Church in India
- List of Saints from India
- List of Catholic saints from Oceania
