= List of Filipinos venerated in the Catholic Church =

This is a list of Filipino saints, beati, venerables, and Servants of God by the Catholic Church. Majority of these men and women of religious life were born, died, or lived within the Philippine archipelago.

Ferdinand Magellan's expedition of 1521 to the islands included Catholic priests and missionaries among the crew. Some Catholic missionaries became the explorers of the native lands while converting and coercing the Indios towards Christianity. Because of the Spanish colonization started by Miguel López de Legazpi, Christianity was introduced in Cebu, which remains a bastion of the Catholic faith in the Philippines.

Several Filipino Catholics have been considered for sainthood over the past centuries. Most are from the 20th century and later.

The first Filipino canonized as saint was Lorenzo Ruiz, a married lay Dominican member of the Confraternity of the Rosary. Ruiz died a martyr of faith in Nagasaki, as Japan under the Tokugawa Shogunate regularly conducted anti-clerical campaigns and widespread persecution of Christians. Ruiz was beatified by Pope John Paul II in Manila in 1981, and later canonized at St. Peter's Square, Vatican City, in 1987. 25 years later, the title of “Saint” was bestowed upon another martyr, Pedro Calungsod, martyred on Guam. He was canonized in October 2012 by Pope Benedict XVI.

== Saints ==
Image	Name	Born	Died	Church Status	Diocese	Type of Cause	Ref.
	Lorenzo Ruiz	November 28, 1594 in the Captaincy General of the Philippines	September 29, 1637 in Nagasaki, Tokugawa Shogunate	Married layperson; Member of the Confraternity of the Rosary;	Manila	Martyr in odium fidei, uti fertur	
	Lorenzo Ruiz	November 28, 1594 in the Captaincy General of the Philippines	September 29, 1637 in Nagasaki, Tokugawa Shogunate	Declared "Venerable": October 11, 1980; Beatified: February 18, 1981 by Pope John Paul II; Canonized: October 18, 1987 by Pope John Paul II			
	Pedro Calungsod	July 21, 1654 in one of the Visayan islands, Captaincy General of the Philippines	April 2, 1672 in Tumon, Guam, Captaincy General of the Philippines	Young layperson	Cebu	Martyr in odium fidei, uti fertur	
	Pedro Calungsod	July 21, 1654 in one of the Visayan islands, Captaincy General of the Philippines	April 2, 1672 in Tumon, Guam, Captaincy General of the Philippines	Introduction of Cause: February 4, 1994; Declared "Venerable": January 27, 2000; Beatified: March 5, 2000 by Pope John Paul II; Canonized: October 21, 2012 by Pope Benedict XVI			

== Blesseds ==
Image	Name	Born	Died	Church Status	Diocese	Type of Cause	Ref.
	Diego Luis de San Vitores	November 12, 1627 in the Burgos, Spanish Empire	April 2, 1672 in Guam, Captaincy General of the Philippines	Professed Priest of the Jesuits;		Martyr in odium fidei, uti fertur	
	Diego Luis de San Vitores	November 12, 1627 in the Burgos, Spanish Empire	April 2, 1672 in Guam, Captaincy General of the Philippines	Declared "Venerable": November 9, 1984; Beatified: October 6, 1985 by Pope John Paul II			
	Eugenio Sanz-Orozco Mortera (rel. name: José María of Manila)	September 5, 1880 in Manila, Captaincy General of the Philippines	August 17, 1936 in Madrid, Spain	Professed Priest of the Friars Minor Capuchin		Martyr in odium fidei, uti fertur	
	Eugenio Sanz-Orozco Mortera (rel. name: José María of Manila)	September 5, 1880 in Manila, Captaincy General of the Philippines	August 17, 1936 in Madrid, Spain	Introduction of Cause: February 4, 1994; Declared "Venerable": March 27, 2013; Beatified: October 13, 2013 by Cardinal Angelo Amato			
	Iustus Takayama Ukon (Hikogorō Shigetomo)	1552 in Haibara, Nara, Ashikaga shogunate	February 1615 in Manila, Captaincy General of the Philippines	Layperson	Manila	Martyr in odium fidei, uti fertur	
	Iustus Takayama Ukon (Hikogorō Shigetomo)	1552 in Haibara, Nara, Ashikaga shogunate	February 1615 in Manila, Captaincy General of the Philippines	Introduction of Cause: 1630 by the Archdiocese of Manila / Reintroduced: 1963; Declared "Venerable": January 21, 2016; Beatified: February 7, 2017, by Cardinal Angelo Amato			

== Venerables ==
Image	Name	Born	Died	Church Status	Diocese	Type of Cause	Ref.
	Isabel Larrañaga Ramírez (rel. name: Isabel of the Heart of Jesus)	November 19, 1836 in Manila, Captaincy General of the Philippines (Insurales Filipino)	January 17, 1899 in Havana, American Cuba	Professed religious, Founder of the Sisters of Charity of the Sacred Heart of Jesus		Heroic Virtues	
	Isabel Larrañaga Ramírez (rel. name: Isabel of the Heart of Jesus)	November 19, 1836 in Manila, Captaincy General of the Philippines (Insurales Filipino)	January 17, 1899 in Havana, American Cuba	Declared "Venerable": March 26, 1999			
	Ignacia del Espíritu Santo de Juco	February 1, 1663 in Manila, Captaincy General of the Philippines	September 10, 1748 in Manila, Captaincy General of the Philippines	Professed religious, Founder of the Religious of the Virgin Mary	Manila	Heroic Virtues	
	Ignacia del Espíritu Santo de Juco	February 1, 1663 in Manila, Captaincy General of the Philippines	September 10, 1748 in Manila, Captaincy General of the Philippines	Declared "Venerable": July 6, 2007			
	Consuelo Barcelo	July 24, 1857 in Barcelona, Spain	August 4, 1940 in Manila, Philippine Commonwealth	Professed religious, Cofounder of the Augustinian Sisters of Our Lady of Consolation		Heroic Virtues	
	Consuelo Barcelo	July 24, 1857 in Barcelona, Spain	August 4, 1940 in Manila, Philippine Commonwealth	Introduction of Cause: September 2002; Declared "Venerable": December 20, 2012			
	Aloysius Schwartz	September 18, 1930 in Washington D.C., U.S.	March 16, 1992 in Manila, Philippines	Professed priest, Founder of the Sisters of Mary of Banneux and Brothers of Christ	Manila	Heroic Virtues	
	Aloysius Schwartz	September 18, 1930 in Washington D.C., U.S.	March 16, 1992 in Manila, Philippines	Introduction of Cause: 2003; Declared "Venerable":January 22, 2015			
	Alfredo María Obviar	August 29, 1889 in Batangas, Captaincy General of the Philippines	October 1, 1978 in Quezon, Philippines	Bishop of Lucena; Founder of Missionary Catechists of Saint Thérèse of the Infant Jesus	Lucena	Heroic Virtues	
	Alfredo María Obviar	August 29, 1889 in Batangas, Captaincy General of the Philippines	October 1, 1978 in Quezon, Philippines	Declared "Venerable": November 7, 2018			
	María Beatriz del Rosario de Arroyo	February 17, 1884 in Molo, Iloilo, Captaincy General of the Philippines	June 14, 1957 in Iloilo City, Philippines	Professed religious; Founder of the Dominican Sisters of the Most Holy Rosary of the Philippines (Dominican Sisters of Molo)	Jaro	Heroic Virtues	
	María Beatriz del Rosario de Arroyo	February 17, 1884 in Molo, Iloilo, Captaincy General of the Philippines	June 14, 1957 in Iloilo City, Philippines	Declared "Venerable": June 11, 2019			
	Francisca del Espíritu Santo de Fuentes	1647 in Manila, Captaincy General of the Philippines	August 24, 1711 in Manila, Captaincy General of the Philippines	Professed religious; Founder of the Dominican Sisters of St. Catherine of Siena	Manila	Heroic Virtues	
	Francisca del Espíritu Santo de Fuentes	1647 in Manila, Captaincy General of the Philippines	August 24, 1711 in Manila, Captaincy General of the Philippines	Declared "Venerable": July 5, 2019			
	Teofilo Camomot	March 3, 1914 in Carcar, Cebu, Philippine Islands	September 27 1988 in San Fernando, Cebu, Philippines	Coadjutor Archbishop of Cagayan de Oro; Titular Archbishop of Marcianopolis; Founder of the Daughters of Saint TeresaCatherine of Siena	Cebu	Heroic Virtues	
	Teofilo Camomot	March 3, 1914 in Carcar, Cebu, Philippine Islands	September 27 1988 in San Fernando, Cebu, Philippines	Declared "Venerable": May 21, 2022			

== Servants of God ==
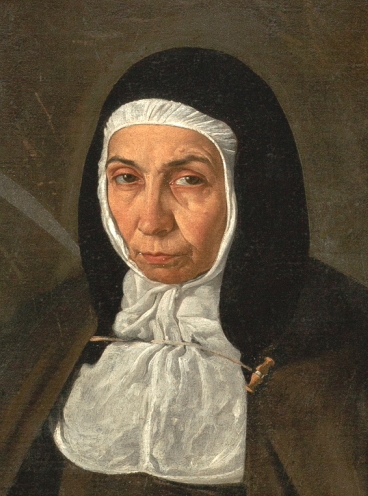
Mo. Jerónima of the Assumption, OSC

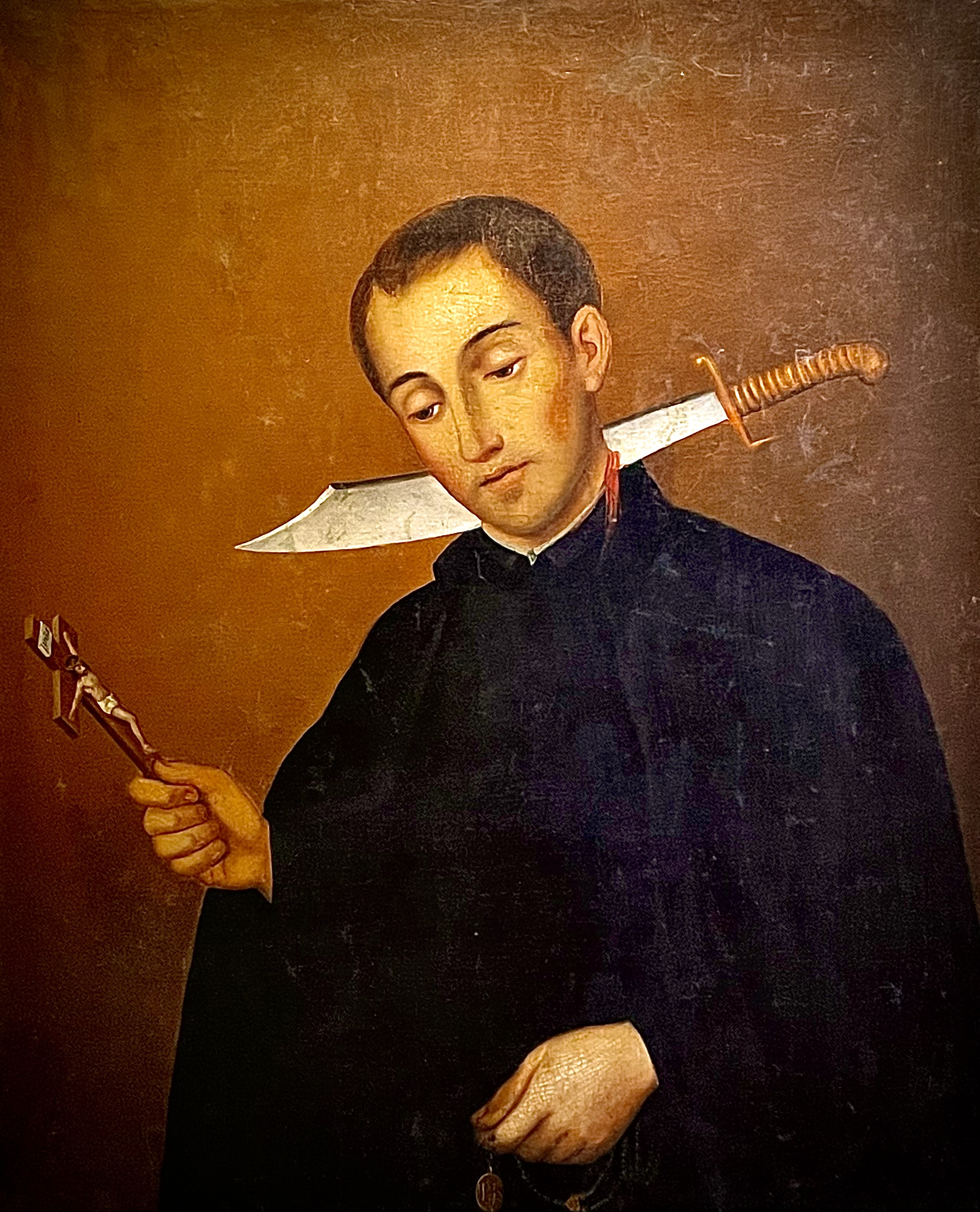
Fr. Francesco Palliola, SJ

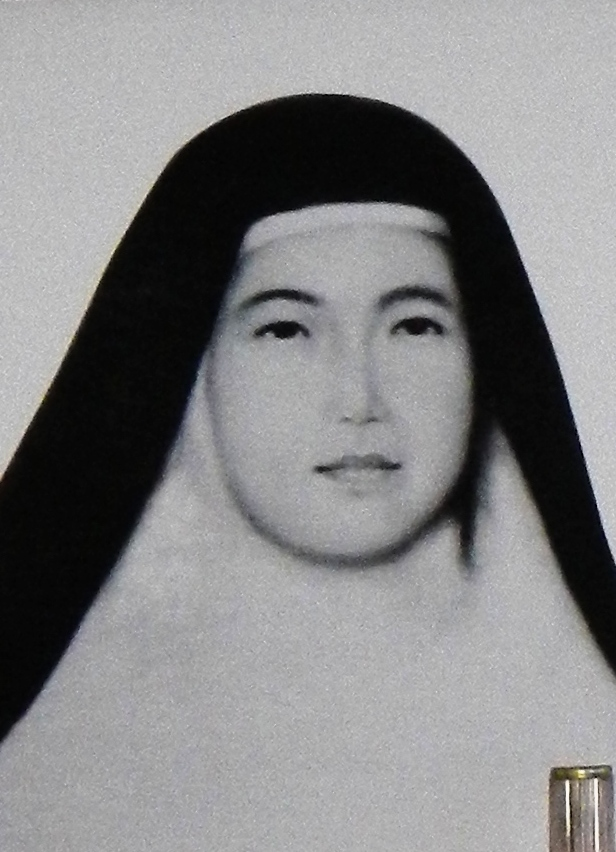
Mo. Dionisia Talangpaz, OAR

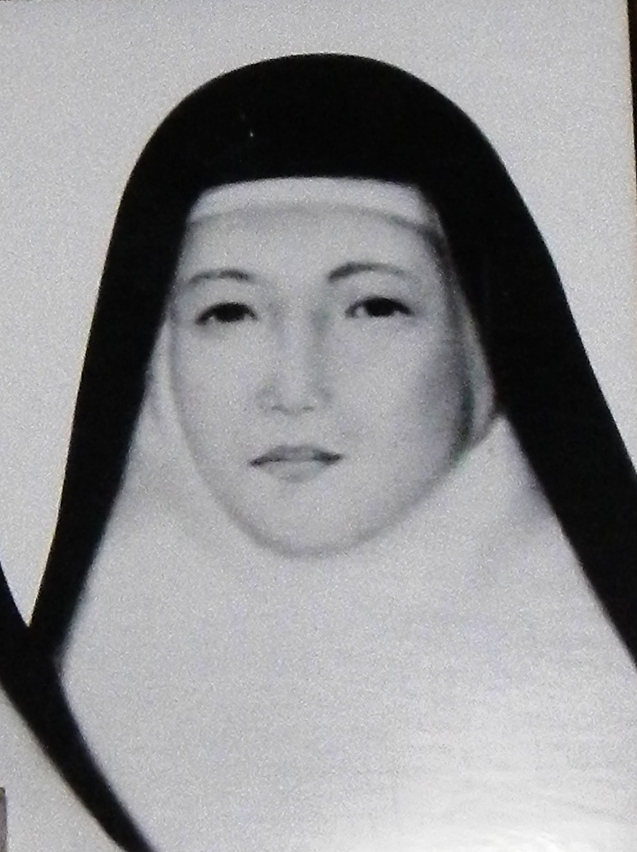
Mo. Cecilia Talangpaz, OAR

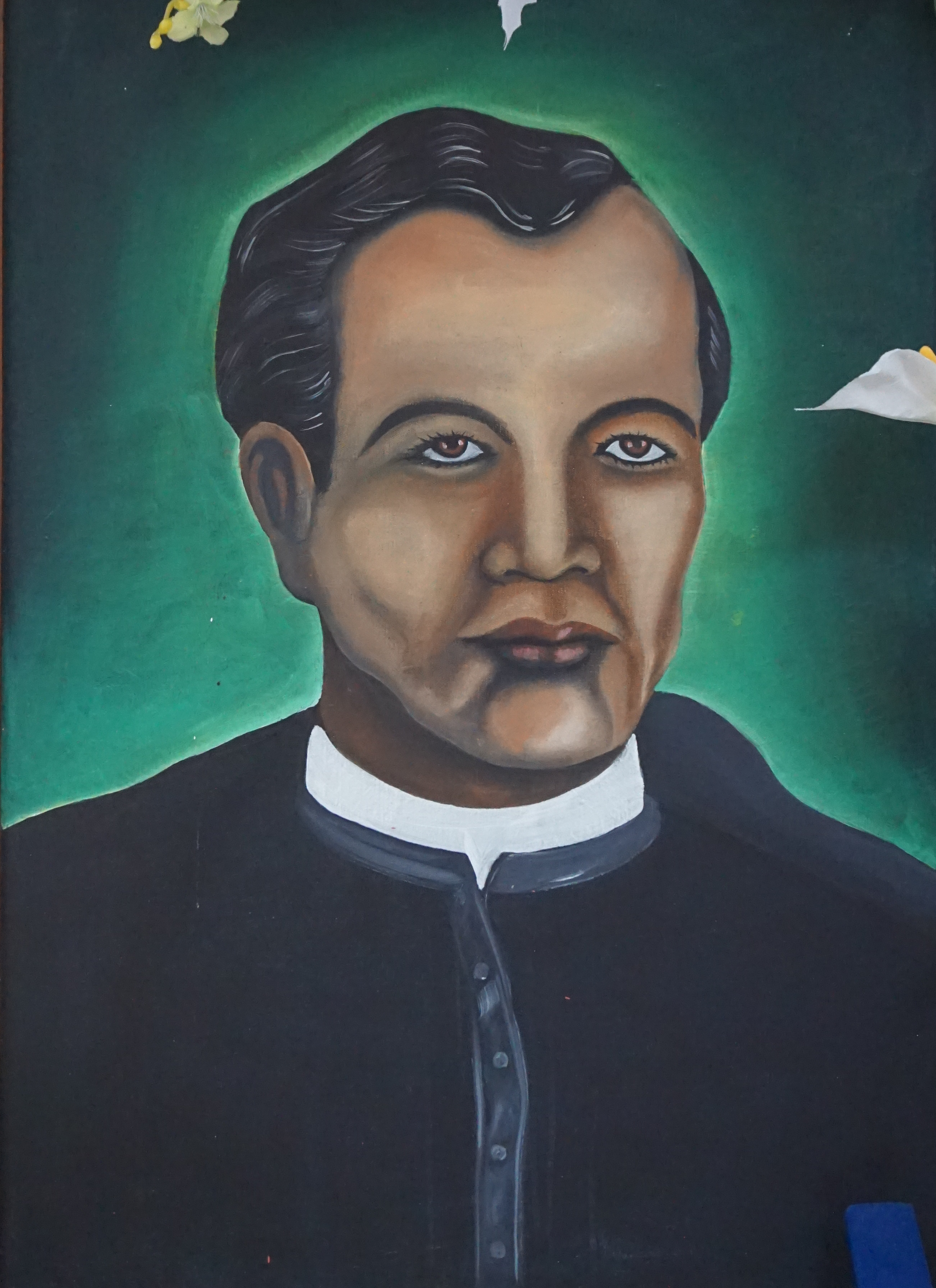
Fr. Pedro Pelaez

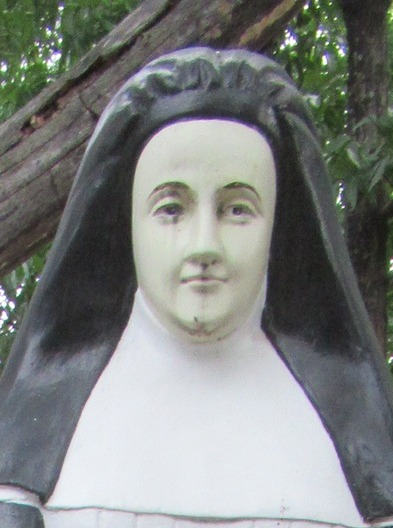
Mo. Rita Barcelo Pages, OSA

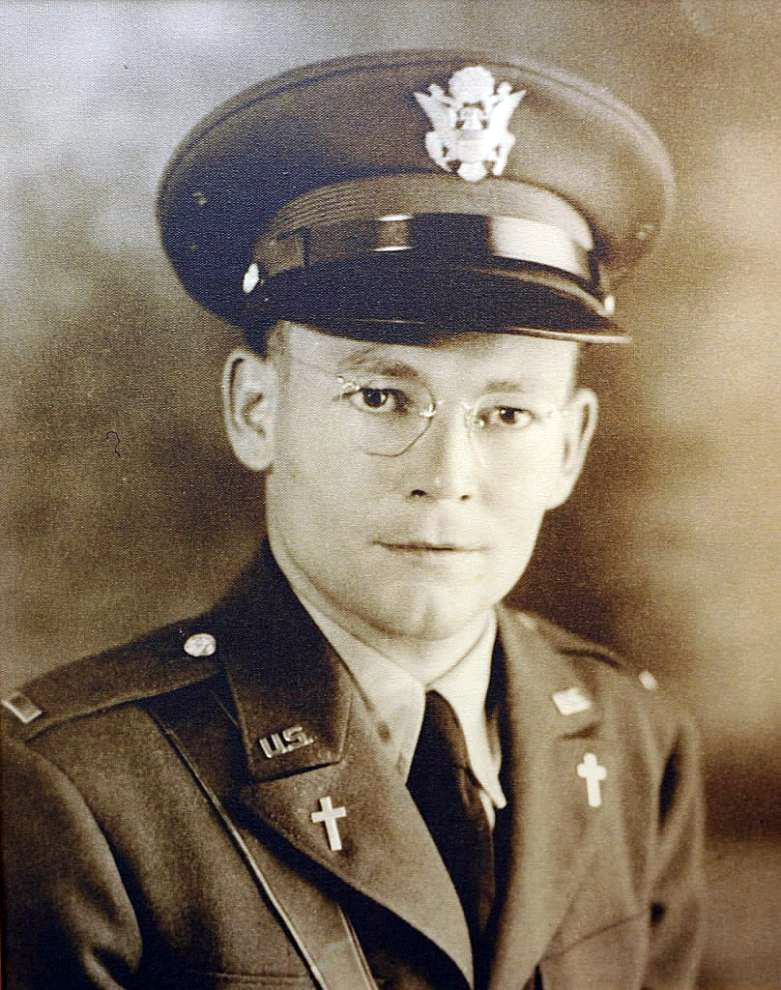
Fr. Joseph Verbis Lafleur

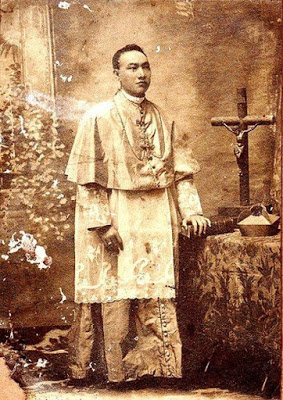
Bp. Alfredo Verzosa

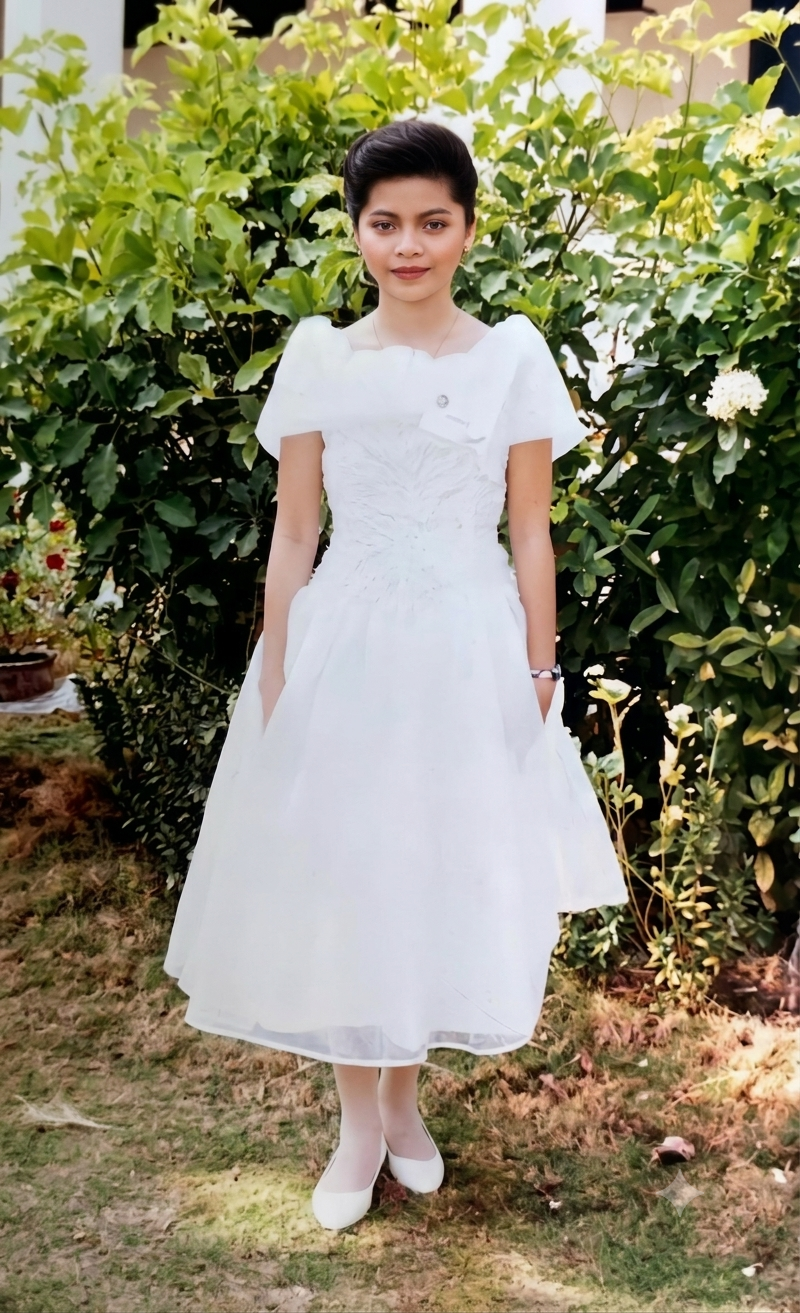
Niña Ruiz Abad
- Diego de Herrera (1521–1576), Professed Priest of the Augustinians (Spain - Catanduanes, Philippines)
- Jerónima Yañez de la Fuente (Jerónima of the Assumption) (1555–1630), Professed Religious of the Poor Clare Nuns (Toledo, Spain - Manila, Philippines)
- Francesco Palliola (1612–1648), Professed Priest of the Jesuits; Martyr (Naples, Italy - Zamboanga del Norte, Philippines)
- Cecilia Rosa de Jesús Talangpaz (1693–1731), Cofounder of the Augustinian Recollect Sisters (Bulacan - Manila, Philippines)
- Dionisia de Santa María Mitas Talangpaz (1691–1732), Cofounder of the Augustinian Recollect Sisters (Bulacan - Manila, Philippines)
- Pedro Pelaez (1812–1863), Priest of the Archdiocese of Manila (Laguna – Manila, Philippines)
- Ines Joaquina Vicenta Barcelo Pages (Rita) (1843–1904), Founder of the Augustinian Sisters of Our Lady of Consolation (Barcelona, Spain - Manila, Philippines)
- María Ángeles Rodríguez de Rivera Chicote (1882–1936), Layperson of the Diocese of Málaga; Martyr (Maguindanao, Philippines – Málaga, Spain)
- Wilhelm Finnemann (1882–1942), Professed Priest of the Society of the Divine Word; Apostolic Vicariate of Calapan; Martyr (North Rhine-Westphalia, Germany - Batangas, Philippines)
- Joseph Verbis Lafleur (1912–1944), Priest of the Military Ordinate of the United States (Louisiana, USA - Zamboanga del Norte, Philippines)
- Alfredo Verzosa (1877–1954), Bishop of Lipa; Founder of the Missionary Catechists of the Sacred Heart (Ilocos Sur, Philippines)
- Cesar Maria Guerrero (1885‒1961) Bishop of Lingayen and San Fernando (Manila, Philippines)
- Florencia Cuesta Valluerca (Trinidad of the Sacred Heart of Jesus) (1904–1967), Professed Religious of the Carmelite Nuns of the Ancient Observance (Madrid, Spain - Manila, Philippines)
- Carlo Braga (1889–1971), Professed Priest of the Salesians of Don Bosco (Sondrio, Italy - Pampanga, Philippines)
- Dalisay Lazaga (1940–1971), Professed Religious of the Canossians Daughters of Charity (Laguna - Manila, Philippines)
- Amador Tajanlangit Sr. (1911–1977), Married Layperson of the Archdiocese of Jaro (Iloilo, Philippines)
- George J. Willmann (1897–1977), Professed Priest of the Jesuits (New York, USA - Manila, Philippines)
- Niña Ruiz Abad (1979–1993), Child of the Diocese of Laoag (Quezon City, Philippines)
- Richard Michael Fernando (1970–1996), Professed Cleric of the Jesuits; Martyr (Quezon City, Philippines - Angk Snuol, Cambodia)
- Rhoel Gallardo (1965–2000), Professed Priest of the Claretians; Martyr (Zambales - Basilan, Philippines)
- Giuseppe Aveni (1918–2010), Professed Priest of the Rogationists of the Heart of Jesus (Messina, Italy - Parañaque, Philippines)
- Laureana Franco (1936–2011), Layperson of the Diocese of Pasig; Member of the Legion of Mary (Manila, Philippines)
- Darwin Ramos (1994–2012), Young Layperson of the Diocese of Cubao (Quezon City, Philippines)

== Group martyrs ==
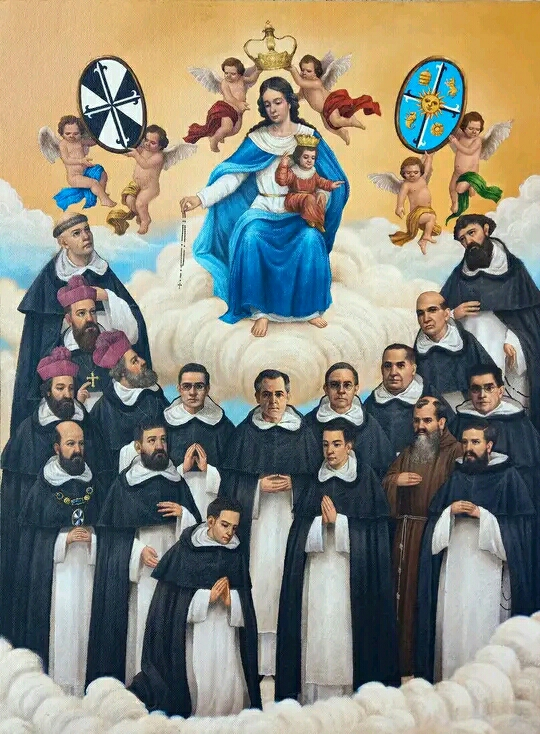
17 Thomasian Martyrs

This section includes the list of martyrs pending for the Cause for Sainthood. Majority of them are underway for canonization proposed by the Congregation for the Causes of Saints (CCS).

- Jesuit Martyrs in Micronesia, Jesuit and lay missionaries in Guam and the Federated States of Micronesia who died for the Christian faith and mission. Companion martyrs of Pedro Calungsod and Diego Luis de San Vitores.
  - Luis de Medina
  - Hipolito de la Cruz
  - Lorenzo
  - Diego Bazan
  - Damian Bernal
  - Nicolas de Figueroa
  - Francisco Esquerra
  - Pedro Diaz
  - Antonio Maria de San Basilio
  - Sebasian de Monroy
  - Andrés de la Cruz
  - Manuel Solorzano
  - Juan de los Reyes
  - Balthasar Dubois
  - Teofilo de Angelis
  - Felipe Songsong
  - Unnamed companions
- De La Salle Martyrs of 1945, The Companion Martyrs of William Kelley (Egbert Xavier). All Professed Religious' of the Brothers of the Christian Schools (De La Salle Brothers)
  - John Concoran (Flavius Leo)
    - Born: June 13, 1876 – Castlecomer, Kilkenny, Ireland
  - Wilhelm Hengelbrock (Mutwald William)
    - Born: November 10, 1907 – Osnabruck, Germany
  - Alois Seipel (Paternus Paul)
    - Born: March 21, 1908 – Marborn, Steinau an der Strasse, Main-Kinzig, Germany
  - Wilhelm Spieker (Arkadius Maria)
    - Born: November 10, 1910 – Kassel, Germany
  - Joseph Hastreiter (Gerfreid Joseph)
    - Born: August 23, 1912 – Furth im Wald, Cham, Germany
  - Lorenz Kreitner (Hartmann Hubert)
    - Born: October 23, 1912 – Mannheim, Germany
  - Johann Nepomuk Meier (Maximin Maria)
    - Born: September 30, 1913 – Frommersbach, Zerf, Trier-Saarburg, Germany
  - Hermann Joseph Gelb (Berthwin Philibert)
    - Born: October 13, 1913 – Hockenheim, Rhein-Neckar-Kreis, Germany
  - Helmut Jakob Wegner (Romuald Suxtus)
    - Born: August 29, 1914 – Ludwigshafen, Germany
  - Gyula Miklos (De La Salle Janos Baptista)
    - Born: 1918 – Budapest, Hungary
  - Johannes Kuntz (Freidebert Johannes)
    - Born: July 15, 1915 – Rheinfelden, Lorrach, Germany
  - Ernst Kammerling (Lambert Romanus)
    - Born: April 28, 1917 – Erkelenz, Heinsburg, Germany
  - Alfons Bender (Adolf Gebhard)
    - Born: May 12, 1914 – Herdorf, Altenkirchen, Germany
  - Joseph Biely (Alemond Lucian)
    - Born: 1917 – Slovak Republic
  - Konrad Wehle (Viktorinus Heinrich)
    - Born: November 21, 1914 – Grunmettstetten, Freudenstadt, Germany
    - Died: February 12, 1945 – Malate, Manila, Philippines
- Religious Martyrs of Santo Tomas, professed religious' of the Missionary Sisters Servants of the Holy Spirit, martyred on March 15, 1945.
  - Anna Unterscher (Adelheida)
    - Born: July 27, 1898 – Höhenmoos, Rohrdorf, Rosenheim, Germany
  - Margareta Nieder (Aloysius)
    - Born: March 16, 1903 – Illingen, Neurkirchen, Germany
  - Agnes Hoffman (Ansberta)
    - Born: December 7, 1903 – Answeiler, Marpingen, Sankt Wendel, Germany
  - Paula Diancourt (Benedicta)
    - Born: October 6, 1899 – Dortmund, Erzdiözese Paderborn, Germany
  - Maria Weisert (Bernia)
    - Born: April 8, 1907 – Sigmaringen, Germany
  - Palmaria Molina (Celia)
    - Born: December 2, 1908 – Tayum, Abra, Philippines
  - Petronilla Arjonilla Coral (Cesaria)
    - Born: April 29, 1907 – Mérida, Yucátan, Mexico
  - Maria Klara Schnettler (Cleophana)
    - Born: July 14, 1898 – Hagen, Germany
  - Sophie Hörth (Franciscetta)
    - Born: July 15, 1903 – Neusatz, Bühl, Germany
  - Maria Piebler (Gumberta)
    - Born: August 30, 1911 – Waidhofen an der Ybbs, Austria
  - Elisabet Faulstich (Isburga)
    - Born: September 20, 1908 – Cologne, Germany
  - Elisabeth Maria Anna Hartelt (Passima)
    - Born: July 15, 1903 – Niesse, Opole, Poland
  - Elisabeth Schofs (Placida)
    - Born: July 15, 1884 – Tönisvorst, Viersen, Germany
  - Margarete Mzyk (Richarde)
    - Born: April 3, 1910 – Königshütte, Poland
  - Bernardina Jurcovic (Victimaria)
    - Born: October 25, 1913 – Vištuk, Pezinok, Slovakia
    - Died: March 15, 1945 – Santo Tomas, Batangas, Philippines
- Vincentian Martyrs of the Philippines, priests and religious' of the Congregation of the Mission (Vincentians)
  - Alfonso Sandaña Díez, priest
    - Born: January 6, 1884 – Tardajos, Burgos, Spain
    - Died: September 20, 1942 – Mantalongon, Dalaguete, Cebu, Philippines
  - Aniano González Moreno, priest
    - Born: April 25, 1890 – Isar, Burgos, Spain
    - Died: October 21, 1944 – Baguio, Philippines
  - Prisciano González Moreno, priest
    - Born: October 12, 1885 – Isar, Burgos, Spain
  - Crispín Gómez Vallejo, priest
    - Born: December 4, 1895 – Hontauas, Burgos, Spain
  - Rafael Martínez Rojo, brother
    - Born: October 24, 1876 – Ferrero, León, Spain
  - Gumersindo Novero, seminarian
    - Born: Unknown in Cavite, Philippines
    - Died: February 8, 1945 – Mandaluyong, Manila, Philippines
  - José Tejada Merino, priest
    - Born: March 18, 1892 – Covarrubias, Burgos, Spain
  - Luis Ejeda Martínez, priest
    - Born: August 18, 1881 – Albarracin, Teruel, Spain
  - Adolfo Soto de Celis, priest
    - Born: March 17, 1884 – Rebolledo, Burgos, Spain
  - Julio Ruiz Sánchez, priest
    - Born: May 22, 1890 – Villodrigo, Palencia, Spain
  - José Fernández Fernández, priest
    - Born: October 24, 1891 – Madrid, Spain
  - José Aguirreche Aguirre, priest
    - Born: August 27, 1891 – Régil, Guipúzcoa, Spain
  - Antolín Marcos Pardo, brother
    - Born: September 1, 1879 – Pedrosa de Río Úrbel, Burgos, Spain
  - Valentín Santidrián Bermejo, brother
    - Born: February 12, 1901 – Villadiego, Burgos, Spain
  - Gregorio Induráin Echarte, brother
    - Born: 1870 – Ozcoidi, Urraúl, Alto, Navarra, Spain
  - Alejandro García García, brother
    - Born: Unknown in Spain
    - Died: February 9, 1945 – San Marcelino, Manila, Philippines
  - Jerónimo Pampliega Melgosa, priest
    - Born: Unknown in Rabé de las Calzadas, Burgos, Spain
    - Died: February 19, 1945 – Intramuros, Manila, Philippines
  - Anselmo Andrés, priest
    - Born: 1875 – Spain
    - Died: February 26, 1945 – Santa Cruz, Manila, Philippines

== See also ==
- Catholic Church in the Philippines
- List of saints from Asia
- Gomburza
- James B. Reuter, American priest and resident in the Philippines
