= Jesuit Martyrs in Micronesia =

Jesuit Martyrs of Micronesia

Martyrs
- Born: Various
- Died: 1670–1685
- Venerated in: Catholic Church

The Jesuit Martyrs of Micronesia (1670–1685) were a group of Catholic Christians who were martyred in Guam and the Mariana Islands.

== History ==
=== 1668–1672 ===
The Jesuit mission in the Mariana Islands was the first in Oceania; it soon also proved to be one of the bloodiest. On June 15, 1668, Diego Luis de San Vitores and a band of five other Jesuits arrived on Guam, the southernmost and largest island in a cordillera of fifteen volcanic islands. With the missionaries came a garrison of thirty soldiers, many of them colonials from the Philippines, whose responsibility was to protect the missionaries and to pacify the local people if need should arise. The initial reception of the missionaries by the Chamorro people was enthusiastic and reassuring. Within two months, however, the first show of hostility occurred when Fr. Luis de Morales was attacked and injured as he was on his way to baptize a dying man on Tinian. Two of the soldiers who accompanied him were hacked to death by the villagers. A similar incident took place on Guam at about the same time; Fr. Luis Medina was beaten so badly by a hostile mob that his face was swollen for weeks. The Jesuits attributed this sudden display of hostility to the calumnies of a Chinese castaway who had made his home in the Marianas for more than twenty years. He had spread the tale that the priests poisoned infants when they poured baptismal waters on their heads. These early outbursts were followed by a period of peace that lasted almost a year, but when the Chamorro chief who had become the protector of the missionaries on Guam died, trouble broke out anew.

On the next missionary journey to the northern islands, a Malabarese catechist by the name of Lorenzo was seized by an angry rob and killed with spears after he had baptized a dying child. The stories of poisonous waters may have been getting a wide hearing, but there was more to the trouble than just these outlandish tales. The Jesuits had stepped into an island society that was a tangle of political divisions and alliances of convenience. In identifying themselves with one region through the chief who protected them, they had entirely unawares made enemies in other places. In such hostile areas, stories about the religious rites they performed, or almost any other misunderstanding, were sufficient to spark off a display of aggression. San Vitores, who was the superior of the Jesuit band and held civil authority over the troops, was the meekest of men and had forbidden the building of fortifications or the use of firearms. Nonetheless, the recent turn of events had persuaded him that sterner measures might be necessary for the preservation of the mission. Accordingly, he ordered larger detachments sent out to pacify outlying areas of the mission and he wrote to the Spanish for reinforcements to bolster the garrison. San Vitores may have personally "welcomed martyrdom," but he had the responsibility of seeing to it that the mission was not wiped out, leaving the inhabitants of the islands without what he believed to be the necessary means of salvation. Despite San Vitores' efforts to forestall further hostilities, another outbreak occurred in January 1670 when Fr. Luis de Medina and two Filipino catechists visited Saipan to resume preaching there. The priest and his companions were taunted by a threatening band of Chamorros from the moment they came ashore. Two days later, on January 29, as the priest was on his way to baptize a sick child, he and his catechists were attacked by thirty armed Chamorros. Medina and one of his catechists, Hipolito de la Cruz, died in the volley of spears.

Another uprising took place, this one on Guam, in mid 1670. The execution of a local chief for the murder of a Spanish boy led to a siege of the Spanish fort for a number of weeks, until the Chamorro force disbanded and an uneasy peace followed for the next several months. This peace came to an abrupt end when Diego Bazan, a young Mexican helper, was ambushed and cut to pieces by two machete-wielding Guamanians. On the next day, a Spanish soldier and two Filipino catechists, Damian Bernal and Nicolas de Figueroa, were also surprised and killed. A few days later, on April 2, 1672, San Vitores was on his way from his parish in northern Guam to the mission center in Agana, when he stopped to baptize a sick child against the orders of the child's father. The father, enraged at San Vitores for administering the sacrament, fell on the priest and his companion, Pedro Calungsod. The catechist died first, and then the Jesuit fell after receiving a cutlass blow to the head and a spear thrust in the heart. Calungsod was canonised by Pope Benedict XVI in 2012.

=== 1672–1685 ===
San Vitores' death was a shocking blow for the new mission, not quite four years old at the time. His enthusiasm had been responsible for the founding of the mission, and his cheerful austerity as he went about his work was a source of constant inspiration for his companions. But his influence proved to extend far beyond the Marianas archipelago; within two years of his death, the first of the many biographies was published and San Vitores was already being heralded as a saint throughout much of Europe. Soon many miracles were ascribed to him during his lifetime and found their way into his biographies. His cause for canonization has been introduced and is close to being decided at this writing. The following years brought still more bloodshed; they saw the deaths of four more Jesuits and a number of their lay helpers. In February 1674, Fr. Francisco Esquerra and the five Filipino assistants with him were brutally murdered when the priest tried to give the Last Sacraments to an elderly Chamorro woman in the northern part of Guam. In December 1675, the Jesuit brother Pedro Diaz and two of his lay mission helpers were cut down after he reproached a group of young trouble-makers who had entered the mission school and were creating a loud commotion. The young men were already angry at Diaz for persuading some of the more desirable to abandon their promiscuous life and resume their schooling. Just one month later, in January 1676, Fr. Antonio de San Basilio was killed when a Chamorro struck him a fierce blow to the head after being accused of cheating the priest. The next to fall was Fr. Sebastian de Monroy, who was killed in September 1676 in retaliation for the execution of a native chief after a Spanish soldier was found murdered. Monroy and six soldiers were on their way from Sumay to Hagåtña after the outbreak of trouble when they were lured onto the canoe of a chief whom they had thought friendly. The Chamorros overturned the canoe once it was well off shore, and massacred the priest and soldiers with spears and clubs. With the death of Monroy, the first period of martyrdom came to an end. On June 13, 1681, a new governor, Antonio de Saravia y Villar, arrived and served for two years. The arrival of military reinforcements and the adoption of stronger sanctions by Spanish authorities introduced a period of relative tranquility for the following eight years. The mission had already suffered the loss of six Jesuits and another fifteen catechists, most of them Filipinos.

Nonetheless, new volunteers for the Marianas mission came from all over Europe, particularly the northern countries, in numbers more than sufficient to compensate for the martyrs. The Spanish program to pacify the archipelago continued all the while under several different governors and military commanders. One of the most vigorous of these, Don Jose Quiroga, decided in early 1684 that he would lead an expeditionary force through the northern islands to put an end to Chamorro resistance once and for all. While Quiroga and a large part of the Spanish militia were on this campaign in the north, a few disaffected chiefs from Guam took this opportunity to attack the greatly reduced garrison there. On July 24, 1684, a band of forty warriors entered the stockade under the pretense of attending Mass, attacked the Spanish force, and killed several of the defenders. Two Jesuits were slain and four others wounded in the assault. Fr. Manuel Solorzano, the mission superior, was stabbed several times in the head, had one of his hands covered, and finally was killed with a knife thrust to the throat. Br. Balthasar Dubois, a Dutch lay brother who had come to the mission five years earlier, had his skull crushed in the attack. One of those wounded was the Filipino Donado Felipe Songsong and Andres de la Cruz. Perhaps a dozen or so lay helpers also lost their lives in the assault. As news of the attack on the fort spread throughout Guam, numerous uprisings broke out in the villages. Most of the Jesuit pastors were, by good fortune, already en route to Agana to attend a mission meeting later in the day. Only Fr. Teofilo de Angelis, the pastor of a village in northern Guam, failed to make it to safety. The priest was preparing to sail to Rota when two assailants sent by the local chief seized him and hanged him from the mast of the canoe, afterwards stripping his body and casting it into the sea. Two other Jesuits working on Rota also lost their lives in the revolt. Fr. Augustin Strobach, who had arrived in the mission only three years before, was pursued by hostile canoes when he made for Guam at the news of the uprising and was forced to return to Rota. In early August he set out again, this time towards the north to bring news of the revolt to Quiroga, but was apprehended at Tinian and beaten to death. Strobach's colleague, Fr. Karl von Boranga, managed to continue his work on Rota for another month after Strobach's death before he was accosted on September 24, 1684, and stabbed and clubbed to death. Another Jesuit, Fr. Pierre Coemans, had in the meantime joined a Spanish expedition sailing out of Saipan for the northernmost islands in the archipelago. When, on their return voyage, the Chamorro pilots overturned the canoes and drowned most of the soldiers, Coemans managed to save himself and made his way to Saipan to continue his work there. A year later, in July 1685, however, Coemans finally met a martyr's death when he was apprehended, tied to a tree, and killed with stones and spears. With Coemans' death, the first and greatest age of martyrdom came to an end in the young Marianas mission.

Twelve Jesuits and perhaps two dozen of their lost colleagues lost their lives for the sake of the gospel during the first two decades of missionary activity. After 1685, however, all but token resistance ended among the Chamorro people. With Quiroga's pursuit and punishment of those responsible for the assault on the fort in Guam, and with his pacification of the northern islands, peace was eventually established in the Marianas and the Jesuits worked unobstructed for the next century.

=== Later persecution ===
Some persecution carried on after this time; other missionaries, including Ignacio de Ibarguen (1681–1730) and Giovanni Antonio Cantova (1686–1731), were exiled to Humåtac in 1715 after denouncing local officials as being corrupt.

During WWII, six Catholics from Rota were taken to Saipon and executed on charges of espionage.

== Martyrs ==
=== Father Luis de Medina and his auxiliary, Hipolito de la Cruz ===
Firsts to be martyred. The initial reception of the missionaries by the Chamorro people was enthusiastic and reassuring. Within two months, however, the first shows of hostility occurred. Luis De Medina was born February, 1637 in Malaga, Spain and became a missionary. Hipolito de la Cruz was a Visayan catechist and Jose was a boy who came from the Philippines. On January 29, 1670, he was hurdled to death together with Fr. Luis de Medina in Saipan. Despite Sanvitores' efforts to forestall further hostilities, another outbreak occurred in January 1670 when Fr. Luis de Medina and two Filipino catechists visited Saipan to resume preaching there. The priest and his companions were taunted by a threatening band of Chamorros from the moment they came ashore. Two days later, on January 29, as the priest was on his way to baptize a sick child, he and his catechists were attacked by thirty armed Chamorros. Medina and one of his catechists, Hipolito de la Cruz, died in the volley of spears.

=== Lorenzo ===
A young layperson who accompanied the Jesuits to Guam. On the next missionary journey to the northern islands, a Malabarese catechist by the name of Lorenzo was seized by an angry rob and killed with spears after he had baptized a dying child

=== Diego Bazan ===
A young Mexican helper of the Jesuits. He was ambushed and cut to pieces by two machete-wielding Guamanians. He died on March 31, 1672.

=== Damian Bernal and Nicolas de Figueroa ===
On April 1, 1672, in search of a Mexican colleague who turned out to have been murdered, the company of a Tagalog youth, a Spaniard, Manuel Rangel and a local convert, Ambrosio Hagman encountered a band of 20 ferocious natives who tried to ambush them. Though outnumbered, they fought back in self-defense and in the process, the natives speared their Spanish companion to death. On the other hand, the fearless Nicolas aimed his cutlass at the headman, killing him instantly. To scare away the followers, Nicolas further beheaded the vanquished whereas he chopped the chief to pieces. Their enemies trembled and fled and the two Filipinos escaped to the hills in separate directions. He ended up in the village of Ipao where a friendly looking native welcomed him with the traditional embrace. But it turned out to be Judas' kiss. He was too tired and trusting for the art of subterfuge which the villagers seemed to have perfected. The treacherous host suddenly seized the catechist, dragged him to the edge of a cliff and flung him over. Below waited the other assailants who ganged up on their Christian victim and slew him with their lances.

=== Pedro Calungsod ===
On April 2, 1672, In their search for a runaway companion named Esteban, Calungsod and Diego Luis de San Vitores came to the village of Tumon, Guam. There they learnt that the wife of the village chief Matå'pang gave birth to a daughter, and they immediately went to baptize the child. Influenced by the calumnies of Choco, the chief strongly opposed to give some time to calm down, the missionaries gathered the children and some adults of the village at the nearby shore and started chanting with them the tenets of the Catholic religion. They invited to join them, but he shouted back that he was angry with God and was fed up with Christian teachings. When he learnt of his daughter's baptism, he became even more furious. He violently hurled spears first at Pedro, who was able to dodge the spears. Witnesses claim that Calungsod could have escaped the attack, but did not want to leave San Vitores alone. Those who knew Calungsod personally meanwhile believed that he could have defeated the aggressors with weapons; San Vitores however banned his companions to carry arms. Calungsod was hit in the chest by a spear and he fell to the ground, then Hirao immediately charged towards him and finished him off with machete blow to the head. San Vitores absolved Calungsod before he too was killed. He took San Vitores' crucifix and pounded it with a stone whilst blaspheming God. Both assassins then denuded the corpses of Calungsod and San Vitores, tied large stones to their feet, brought them out to sea on their proas and threw them into the water.

Calungsod died at the age of 17.

=== Diego Luis de San Vitores ===
Born on November 12, 1627, in Burgos, Spain, to a noble family, Diego Luis de San Vitores renounced worldly wealth and joined the Society of Jesus in 1640. Ordained in 1651, he urgently asked to be sent to a faraway mission where he could win souls for salvation. He was finally sent to the Philippines. On his way there, San Vitores stopped in Guam in 1662 and vowed to return. Three years later, through his close ties to the royal court, he persuaded King Philip IV of Spain and Queen Maria Ana of Austria to order a mission in Guam be established. Thus, Father San Vitores founded the first European settlement in Micronesia through his founding of the Marianas Mission. Well-received at first by the Chamorro, hostilities soon broke out. San Vitores, as the mission leader, became the target of Chamorro wrath during the so-called Great Chamorro War of 1672. He was attacked and died alongside Pedro Calungsod on April 2, 1672.

=== Francisco Esquerra ===
He was born on October 4, 1644, in Manila, Philippines and became a Jesuit priest. In February 1674, Fr. Francisco Esquerra and the five Filipino (names unknown) assistants with him were brutally murdered when the priest tried to give the Last Sacraments to an elderly Chamorro woman in the northern part of Guam.

=== Pedro Diaz ===
Born on 1574 in Avila, Spain and became a missionary to Micronesia. In December 1675, the Jesuit brother Pedro Diaz and two of his lay mission helpers were cut down after he reproached a group of young trouble-makers who had entered the mission school and were creating a loud commotion. The young men were already angry at Diaz for persuading some of the more desirable to abandon their promiscuous life and resume their schooling.

=== Antonio Maria de San Basilio ===
Born on 1643 in Catana, Sicily, Italy. Just one month later after the death of Fr. Pedro Diaz, in January 1676, Fr. Antonio de San Basilio was killed when a Chamorro struck him a fierce blow to the head after being accused of cheating the priest.

=== Sebastian de Monroy ===
The next to fall was Fr. Sebastian de Monroy, born on 1649 in Arahal, Spain. Who was killed in September 1676 in retaliation for the execution of a native chief after a Spanish soldier was found murdered. Monroy and six soldiers were on their way from Sumay to Agana after the outbreak of trouble when they were lured onto the canoe of a chief whom they had thought friendly. The Chamorros overturned the canoe once it was well off shore, and massacred the priest and soldiers with spears and clubs. With the death of Monroy, the first period of martyrdom came to an end. The arrival of military reinforcements and the adoption of stronger sanctions by Spanish authorities introduced a period of relative tranquility for the following eight years. The mission had already suffered the loss of six Jesuits and another fifteen catechists, most of them Filipinos. Nonetheless, new volunteers for the Marianas mission came from all over Europe, particularly the northern countries, in numbers more than sufficient to compensate for the martyrs.

=== Andrés de la Cruz ===
On July 24, 1684, a band of forty warriors entered the stockade under the pretense of attending Mass, attacked the Spanish force, and killed several of the defenders. Two Jesuits were slain and four others wounded in the assault. Fr. Manuel Solorzano, the mission superior, was stabbed several times in the head, had one of his hands covered, and finally was killed with a knife thrust to the throat. Br. Balthasar Dubois, a Dutch lay brother who had come to the mission five years earlier, had his skull crushed in the attack.

=== Manuel Solorzano, Balthasar Dubois and Teofilo de Angelis ===
Fr. Manuel Solorzano was born on December 25, 1649, in Fregenal, Spain, the mission superior, was stabbed several times in the head, had one of his hands covered, and finally was killed with a knife thrust to the throat. Br. Balthasar Dubois was born on March 15, 1654, in Tournai, Belgium, a Dutch lay brother who had come to the mission five years earlier, had his skull crushed in the attack. As news of the attack on the fort spread throughout Guam, numerous uprisings broke out in the villages. Most of the Jesuit pastors were, by good fortune, already en route to Agana to attend a mission meeting later in the day. Only Fr. Teofilo de Angelis born on January 15, 1652, in Siena, Italy, the pastor of a village in northern Guam, failed to make it to safety. The priest was preparing to sail to Rota when two assailants sent by the local chief seized him and hanged him from the mast of the canoe, afterwards stripping his body and casting it into the sea. The three of them died on July 24, 1684, in Ritidian and Agana, Guam.

=== Felipe Songsong ===
In the last wave of aggression against the missionaries in the Marianas in 1684–85, he was attacked. He was severely wounded but survived; however he succumbed to his wounds a year and half later on January 11, 1686.

== See also ==
- List of American candidates for sainthood
- List of Filipino Catholic saints and beatified people
- List of Mexican saints
