= María Ángeles Rodríguez de Rivera Chicote =

Spanish martyr

Servant of God María Ángeles Rodríguez de Rivera Chicote
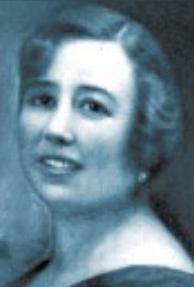
- Born: c. 1884; Cotabato, Maguindanao, Captaincy General of the Philippines
- Died: 28 October 1936 (aged 51–52) at the San Rafael Cemetery, Málaga, Second Spanish Republic

María Ángeles Rodríguez de Rivera Chicote (c. 1884 – 28 October 1936) was a Filipino-born Spanish Catholic laywoman tortured and killed in Málaga during the Spanish Civil War. Her cause for beatification has been initiated.

== Biography ==
María Ángeles was born in 1884 in Cotabato, Maguindanao to Manuel Rodríguez de Rivera, an Infantry Colonel stationed in the Philippines, and Carolina Chicote Beltrán. She had one older sister, Carolina, who was born in Manila, and a younger sister, Carmen, born in Aranjuez.

In 1897, at the start of the Philippine Revolution, their family relocated to Marbella, Spain. Her family has strong religious roots and were daily churchgoers which influenced her younger sister to become a nun.

In Marbella, María Ángeles was known to be "a very religious woman serving the most disadvantaged." Her being an active president of the Catholic Action and head catechist in their parish, and close friendship with the priest, José Vera Medialdea, earned her the hatred of Marxists. She was arrested when the military uprising began and took her to a local jail along with other Marbella residents. Eventually, she was later transferred to another prison in Málaga, in the prison ship "Marqués de Chavarri". Her executioners, under the pretext of having achieved her freedom, took her off the ship and subjected her to more torture. She was shot at the San Rafael Cemetery in Málaga on 28 October 1936.

Buried in a common grave, María Ángeles' remains were later transferred to the crypt of the Cathedral of Málaga.

== Beatification ==
On 27 September 2016, Bishop Jesús Esteban Catalá Ibáñez of Málaga opened her cause for beatification together with 67 other martyrs including Fr. José Vera Medialdea, her parish priest in Marbella.

María Ángeles is the only second Filipino-born martyr of the Spanish Civil War after Bl. José María of Manila, who was beatified in 2013.

== See also ==
- List of Filipinos venerated in the Catholic Church
