= George J. Willmann =

Jesuit priest

Servant of God George Willmann SJ

Personal details
- Born: 29 June 1897 Brooklyn, New York, U.S.
- Died: 14 September 1977 (aged 80) The Bronx, New York, U.S.

George J. Willmann (June 29, 1897 - September 14, 1977) was an American Jesuit regarded as the "Father of the Knights of Columbus in the Philippines". Born in the United States, he was granted Filipino citizenship due to his missionary work in the Philippines.

== Early life and education ==
George J. Willmann was born in Brooklyn, New York on June 29, 1897. His parents were William Godfrey Willmann and Julia Corcoran Willmann. George had two brothers, Edward and William Jr., and four sisters, Miriam, Dorothy, Ruth and Agnes. His sisters Ruth and Agnes became members of Franciscan Missionaries of Mary in their later lives.

From 1902 to 1908, Willmann studied at the Our Lady of Good Counsel Grammar School in Brooklyn, from 1908 to 1913 and at the Boys High and Brooklyn Preparatory School. On August 15, 1915, Willmann entered the Society of Jesus Seminary at Poughkeepsie, New York. He completed his Novitiate and Juniorate by 1922.

Willmann came to the Philippines in 1922 as a seminarian to accomplish a teaching stint at the Ateneo de Manila and later returned to the United States in 1925 to continue his theological studies.

== Missionary work ==
On June 20, 1928, Willmann was ordained at the Woodstock College in Maryland by Archbishop Michael Joseph Curley. Willmann took Tertianship in Poughkeepsie. Willmann served as Director of New York Jesuit Seminary and Mission Bureau from 1930 to 1936. Willmann returned to the Philippines in November 1936 continue teaching at the Ateneo de Manila. He also served as Prefect of Discipline & Treasurer at the same education institution from 1936 to 1937

In 1937 he served as the Session Director of the First National Eucharistic Congress in Manila and on the same year became dean of Ateneo de Manila.

In 1938, Willmann established the Catholic Youth Organization in the Philippines, a religious and recreational organization for the youth. He became the chaplain of the organization on its establishment until 1977. Willmann was also initiated into Order of Knights of Columbus June 30 of the same year. He was appointed Chaplain of Manila Council 1000 based in Intramuros, Manila, with Jose Galan y Blanco, his long-time associate at the Ateneo de Manila, as his proposer.

Servicemen clubs were established under the guidance of the Army-Navy Morale Committee, which Willmann and the auxiliary bishop of Manila, Rufino Santos, were members of in December 1941. In 1942, Willmann entered the Manila San Jose Seminary as a teacher in Social Sciences. He became treasurer of the seminary in 1948. He taught at the seminary until 1951.

Willmann became a prisoner of war during the Japanese occupation of Manila where he was arrested at the University of Santo Tomas by the Japanese in July 1944. He and the other prisoners where later put into a concentration camp in Los Banos, Laguna and was later freed by American forces in 1945.

On July 1, 1975, Willmann was granted Filipino citizenship by then President Ferdinand Marcos through Presidential Decree No. 740 for his "virtuous acts, compassionate and kind and loving service for the Filipino people,".

On June 29, 1977, Pope Paul VI awarded Willmann the Pro Ecclesia et Pontifice medal, the highest award the Pope can give to a laity.

== Death ==
Willmann went to United States in August 1977 for the Ninety-Fifty Annual Supreme Council Convention which took place from August 14 to 17 at Indianapolis in Indiana. Willmann led the Philippine delegation with Bro. Nicanor Y. Fuentes and Bro Concelio B. Cagurangan.

Willmann later went to New York presumedly to pay a visit to his sisters, Ruth, and Agnes Franciscan nun living in Flower Hill, and his nephew James and niece Mary Ruth. The priest was prone to falls because of his weak limbs and had a fall while he was in New York, and needed a hip-bone surgery. The priest was initially confined at St. Francis Hospital in Flower Hill. He was later transferred to Murray-Weigel Hall, a Jesuit infirmary at Fordham University in Fordham, the Bronx, New York City on September 8, 1977. Willmann was later discharged and stayed at the Jesuit House at Fordham. Willmann, died on September 14, 1977, due to cardiac arrest. Willmann's remains were interred at the Jesuit Cemetery in Novaliches, Quezon City, Philippines.

== Legacy ==
The Knights of Columbus established its presence in the Philippines in early 1905, but Willmann was credited for cementing the organization's presence after he took leadership of the group after the World War II. The priest continuously resided in the Philippines since 1936. He also helped established the presence of various organization in the country such as the Daughters of Mary Immaculate (DMI) which was established as the Daughters of Isabella in 1951, Knights of Columbus Fraternal Association in the Philippines, Inc (KCFAPI), KC Foundations, Columbian Squires, and the Catholic Youth Organization (CYO).

The National Executive Committee, led by former Chief Justice Hilario Davide, Jr. and Pedro C. Quitorio as Vice-Chairman, was created to campaign for Willmann's beatification which may lead to the priest's sainthood.

== See also ==
- List of Filipinos venerated in the Catholic Church
