= Raimundus Li Quanzhen =

Chinese catholic saint

Saint Raimundus Li Quanzhen

Martyr
- Born: 1841; Jiaohe, Hebei, China
- Died: 30 June 1900 (aged 58–59); Jiaohe, Hebei, China
- Venerated in: Roman Catholic Church
- Beatified: 17 April 1955, Saint Peter's Square, Vatican City by Pope Pius XII
- Canonized: 1 October 2000, Saint Peter's Square, Vatican City by Pope John Paul II
- Feast: 30 June

Raimundus Li Quanzhen (1841 - 1900) was a devout Christian and a married layman in the Apostolic Vicariate of Southeastern Zhili in Qing China, now the Roman Catholic Diocese of Xianxian. He was one of the first Christian martyrs during the Boxer Rebellion. He is one of the Martyr Saints of China.

== Life ==
Li was born in 1841 at Chentuncun, Jiaohe, Hebei, China.

== Martyrdom ==
On 30 June 1900, Li was beaten to death in Chentuncun, Jiaohe, Hebei, China. He was martyred with Pierre Li Quanhui.

== Canonization ==
Li was venerated on 22 February 1955 by Pope Pius XII as a martyr and beatified on 17 April 1955 by Pope Pius XII. He was canonized by Pope John Paul II on 1 October 2000 along with Mark Ji Tianxiang.
