= Giuseppe Aveni =

Italian Catholic priest and missionary (1918–2010)

Servant of God Giuseppe Aveni RCJ

Orders
- Ordination: 14 July 1945 by Angelo Paino

Personal details
- Born: 5 December 1918 Tripi, Messina, Italy
- Died: July 24, 2010 (aged 91) Parañaque, Philippines
- Buried: Manila Memorial Park – Sucat, Paranaque, Philippines
- Denomination: Roman Catholic
- Parents: Natale Aveni (father); Santa Lo Cicero (mother)
- Occupation: Priest
- Motto: There is nothing better than doing God's will because He is our Father

Giuseppe Aveni (December 5, 1918 – July 24, 2010) was an Italian Roman Catholic priest and missionary in the Philippines. His beatification process was opened in February 2020 by the Roman Catholic Diocese of Parañaque.

== Biography ==
=== Early life ===
Giuseppe was born on December 5, 1918, in Tripi, Messina to pious parents, Natale Tramazza Aveni and Santa Lo Cicero. He received the Sacrament of Confirmation on August 24, 1921, through the hands of Angelo Paino, Archbishop of Messina. He was the youngest child in the family.

=== Formation years ===
On September 7, 1931, at the age of 12, he entered the flourishing congregation of the Rogationists of the Heart of Jesus in Messina. He met personally, its founder, Annibale Maria di Francia, who made a profound influence in his spiritual life. He was admitted to the Postulancy on March 19, 1935, and to the Novitiate on September 29 of the same year.

On March 30, 1937, Aveni made his first profession of vows in Trani. Before taking up studies in sacred theology, he had his Practical Training in Messina from 1939 to 1941. He made his perpetual vows on September 20, 1941, at the age of 23.

=== Priesthood ===
He was ordained a priest on July 15, 1945, by the Archbishop of Messina, Angelo Paino, in the Church of Santa Eustochia Smeralda, Montevergine.

During the first years of his priestly ministry, he was assigned in the "Christ the King" Seminary in Messina as Vice-Superior and Prefect of Discipline until 1947 when he was transferred to Trani, then to Rome and finally in Florence.

=== Missionary life ===
After finishing his mandate as Vicar General, he went to their congregation's recently established mission in the Philippines. Despite being unable to speak English clearly and understand the Filipinos' dialects, he continued to minister to the spiritual welfare of the people.

From 1980 to 1991, he served as a novice master to various congregations, hearing confessions and giving spiritual directions.

The sense of mission remained strong in his life up to the last days. Asked one time by his confreres about his missionary life, he declared:

"As religious, we are cosmopolitan — we are everywhere. Now I'm Filipino. Tomorrow, if my superiors ask me to go back to Italy, or to America or to Africa, [there is] no problem for me".

=== Death ===
In April 2009, he was diagnosed with a malignant tumor. After having suffered patiently, he died on July 24, 2010.

== Beatification ==
On February 2, 2020, led by Bishop Jesse Mercado, the Diocese of Parañaque officially opened Aveni's beatification process.

A close confrere of Aveni, Giuseppe Marazzo, is also in the preliminary steps for a beatification process.

== Memorials ==
The Aveni Medical Clinic in Monterey, California, was established in his honour.

== See also ==
- List of Filipinos venerated in the Catholic Church
