= Felipe Sonsong =

Filipino catechist

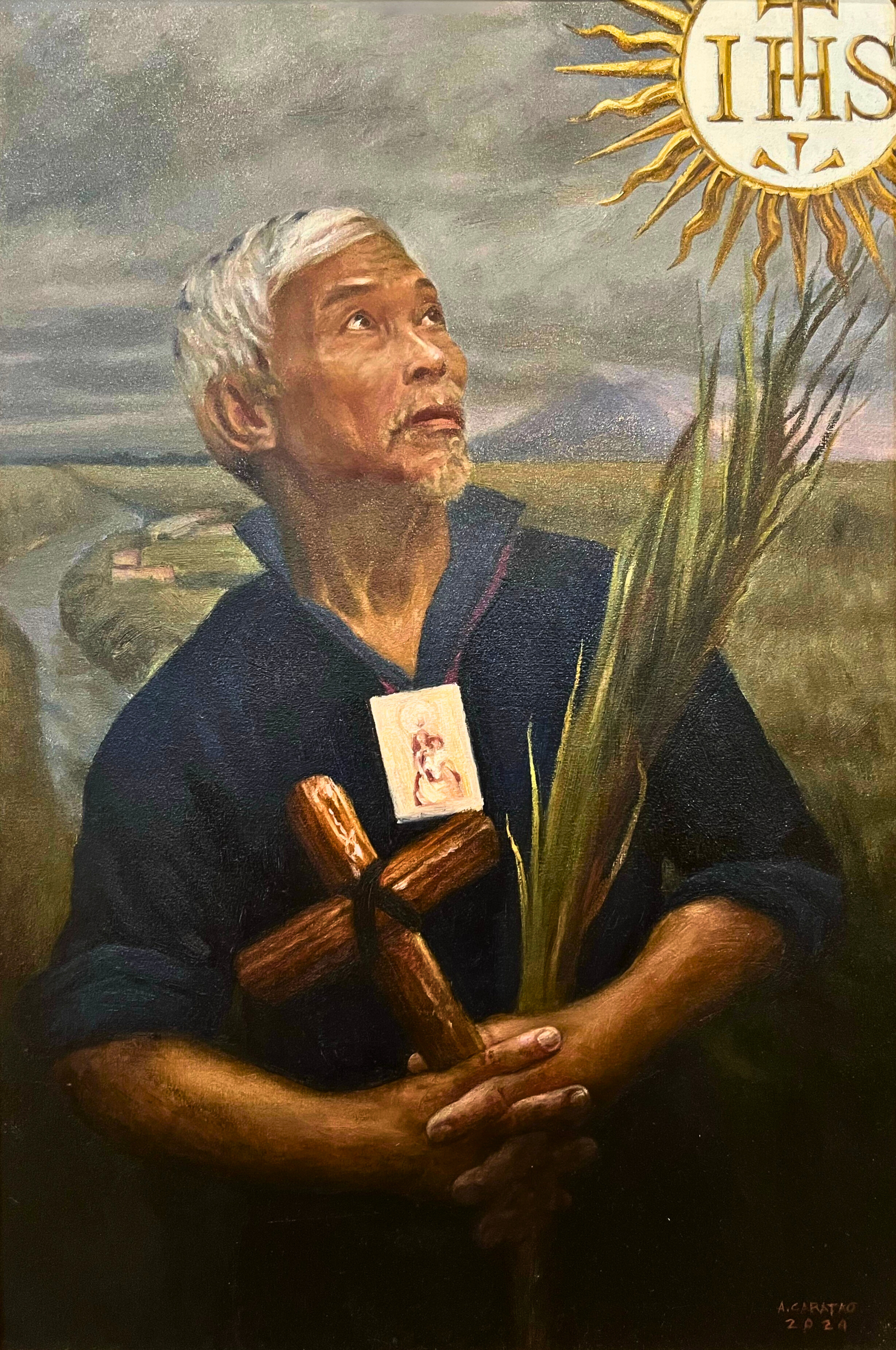
- Born: 1 May 1611; Macabebe, Pampanga, Philippines
- Died: 11 January 1686; Guam

Felipe Sonsong (May 1, 1611 – January 11, 1686) was a Philippine Jesuit. He was born to a noble family of Macabebe, Pampanga. Sonsong was the second Filipino Jesuit. He was married and had a son. After the death of his wife, he entered the Society of Jesus at the age of 57 as a donado and volunteered for the mission in the Marianas under Blessed Diego Luis de San Vítores. His superiors called him "the saintly Philippine" and noted that "(his) solid virtues were an example to his countrymen, and being a noble among his people, (he) is now, we believe, from his blameless life, a most noble citizen of the Realm of Heaven."

== Life ==
He was born on May 1, 1611, to a family of politicians and soldiers in Macabebe, Pampanga. His father, Don Ramón Sonsong, was gobernadorcillo of Macabebe twice, in 1630 and 1632, and Felipe's brother, Agustín Sonsong, was cabeza de barangay of Caputatan, Macabebe in 1633, and later appointed captain of a company of Macabebe soldiers in the Spanish royal infantry, which guarded the Intramuros. Agustin (presumably together with Felipe) is also known to have helped the Spaniards quash a revolt of the Chinese in 1639 and subdue a small Kapampangan uprising in Gapan, Nueva Ecija in 1645.

Thus, the Sonsongs were loyal to Spain but only until 1660, when the Great Kapampangan Revolt broke out, led by Francisco Maniago. This was the time the Sonsongs, like many affluent families in Pampanga, cut their ties with the Spanish civil government (they continued being loyal to the Spanish religious missions). In fact, Agustin's son (Felipe's nephew), Agustin Pamintuan de Sonsong, was Maniago's emissary to Pangasinan and Ilocos, supplying critical information to other rebel groups in the north wanting to join the Kapampangans' rebellion against Spain.

Felipe Sonsong was already a 50-year-old soldier at the time of the Kapampangan revolt. The failure of that revolt, as well as his wife's death in 1667, made Felipe turn his back at the world. He left everything to his son Jeronimo (who served as Macabebe gobernadorcillo for an unprecedented 10 terms) and volunteered his services first to the Augustinians in Pampanga and then to the Dominicans in Manila, working as domestic help and carpenter, despite his advanced age and noble background. And when the Jesuits needed laymen to accompany Diego de San Vitores in his mission to the Marianas, Felipe Sonsong crossed over to the Jesuits.

A party of seventeen, which included Saint Pedro Caluñgsod, and Sonsong's young provincemates, Nicolás de Figueroa, Juan de los Reyes and Andrés de la Cruz, left for Hagåtña aboard the San Diego in 1668. In the Marianas, the saintly Fr. Diego de San Vitores (recently beatified) ordered Felipe to sew pieces of colored sinamay cloth to adorn the chapel's altar, and to make clothes to cover the nakedness of the islanders' chieftains. Felipe also sewed and mended the habits of the missionaries and lay volunteers (including probably Pedro Calungsod, who was in Fr. San Vitores' group), and made rosaries for the newly baptized islanders. "He presented himself for the execution of every task with great charity," the 1686 document says, "in particular of mending and sewing the clothes of those who needed it... When with great promptness he finished one task, he went on to another... And if on some day he had no occupation, or on feast days, he was totally occupied in devotions and spiritual books, in having many periods of prayer, and in giving good advice to those of his nation."

== Martyrdom ==
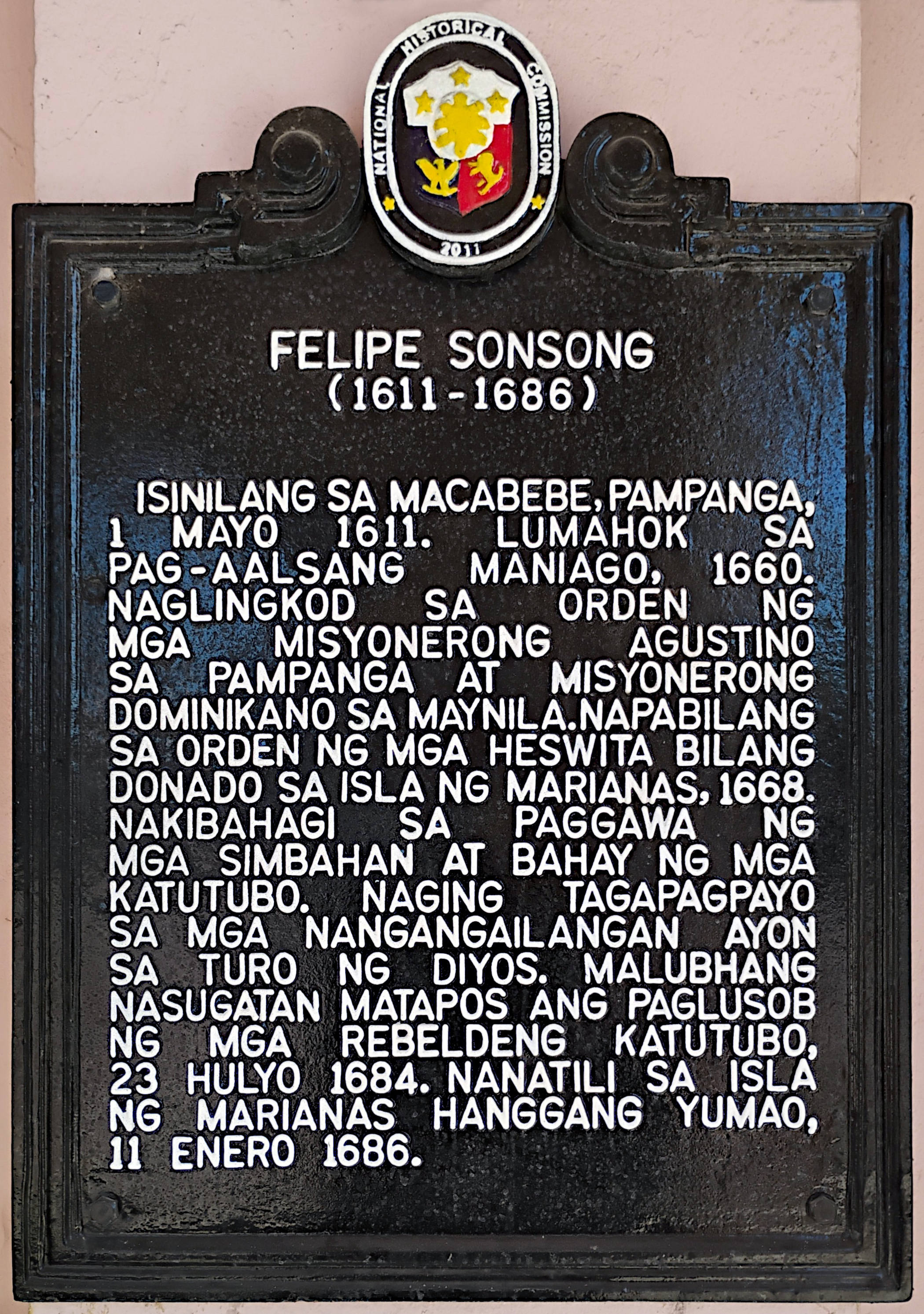
Sonsong historical marker at the San Nicolas de Tolentino Parish Church Plaza, Macabebe, Pampanga.

On July 23, 1684, a band of forty warriors entered the stockade at Agaña under the pretense of attending Mass, attacked the Spanish force, and killed several of the defenders. Felipe Sonsong was severely wounded but survived, though succumbing to his wounds a year and half later on January 11, 1686.

The initial processes of the cause for beatification of San Vitores were held in Guam, Manila, Mexico City and Toledo, Spain in the last quarter of the 17th century. The cause was shelved indefinitely upon the suppression of the Jesuits in the 18th century. It was revived only in 1980. San Vitores was finally beatified in 1985 and Pedro Calungsod was canonized by Pope Benedict XVI on October 21, 2012.

== Beatification ==
The Center for Kapampangan Studies of Holy Angel University has submitted its recommendation to the Archdiocese of San Fernando, for the cause of beatification of Felipe Sonsong. However, the process between the initial beatification and canonization at the St. Peter's Basilica in the Vatican is a long process.

== Bibliography ==
Santiago, Luciano P. R. The Cornerstone: Kapampangan Pioneers in the Catholic Church (1592 – 2001). Angeles City: Center for Kapampangan Studies, 2002.
