= Guam at the 2011 Pacific Games =

- Flag of Guam
- IOC code: GUM

in Nouméa, New Caledonia
- Competitors: 312
- Medals Ranked 14th: Gold 0 Silver 6 Bronze 5 Total 11

Pacific Games appearances
- 1966; 1969; 1971; 1975; 1979; 1983; 1987; 1991; 1995; 1999; 2003; 2007; 2011; 2015; 2019; 2023

Guam competed at the 2011 Pacific Games in Nouméa, New Caledonia between August 27 and September 10, 2011, finishing 14th, with 6 silver and 5 bronze medals. Guam had 312 competitors.

== Athletics ==
Guam has qualified 6 athletes.

Men

- Michael Herreros
- Derek Mandell - 1500m

Women

- Amy Atkinson
- Naomi Blaz
- Pollara Cobb
- Genie Gerardo

== Baseball ==
Guam has qualified a team. Each team can have a maximum of 20 athletes.

Men - Team Tournament

- Dale Alvarez
- Brian Balajadia
- Jathan Barnes
- Rico Castro
- Dominic Cruz
- Ryan Martinez
- Thomas Morrison
- Chad Palomo
- John Pangelinan
- Jim Reyes
- John Salas
- Freddy Cepeda Jr
- Thomas Sarmiento
- Anthony Yatar Jr
- Roke Alcantara Jr
- Alexander Cruz
- Paul Pangelinan
- Joseph Tuquero

== Basketball ==
Guam has qualified a men's and women's team. Each team can consist of a maximum of 12 athletes

Men - Team Tournament

- Andrew Borja
- De’Andre Walker
- Edgardo Baza
- James Stake
- Jine Han
- John Chaco
- Joseph Blas Jr
- Romeo Sanchez
- Seve Susuico
- Shintaro Okada
- Vince Estella
- William Stinnett

Women

- Ann Pajaro
- April Pardilla
- Brianna Benito
- Derin Santos
- Ha’Ani Mendiola
- Jocelyn Pardilla
- Kathryn Castro
- Raelene Tajalle

== Bodybuilding ==
Guam has qualified 3 athletes.

Men

- Inacay Brando - -65 kg
- Richard Rosete - -75 kg

Women

- Florencia Burke - -55 kg

== Canoeing ==
Guam has qualified 8 athletes.

Men

- Austin Carbullido
- Shawn Franquez
- Scott Ishizu
- Jesse Perez
- Kaohu Ruiz
- Carl Aguon Jr
- Alfred Sgambelluri
- William Taitingfong Jr

== Football ==
Guam has qualified a men's and women's team. Each team can consist of a maximum of 21 athletes.

Men

- Brett Maluwelmeng
- Julius Campus
- Matthew Cruz
- Scott Leon Guerrero
- Edward Calvo
- Shawn Spindel
- Ian Mariano
- Dominic Gadia
- Elias Merfalen
- Jason Cunliffe
- Christian Schweizer
- Dylan Naputi
- David Manibusan
- Andre Gadia
- Jonathan Odell
- Joseph Laanan
- Mark Chargualaf

Women

- Nichole Paulino
- Simone Willter
- Ashley Besagar
- Tatyana Ungacta
- Tanya Blas-Cruz
- Rachel Jordan
- Jannel Banks
- Kristin Thompson
- Arisa Recella
- Aika Young
- Alexy Barbe
- Phoebe Minato
- Tiana Jo Piper
- Felicia Alumbaugh
- Susanna Schlub
- Therese Diaz
- Andrea Odell
- Jena Cruz

== Golf ==
Guam has qualified 8 athletes.

Men

- Mando Iwanaga
- Jimmy Mafnas
- John Muna
- Nathan Zhao

Women

- Teresita Blair
- Pearl Magallanes
- Anna-Rose Tarpley
- Nalathai Vongjalorn

== Judo ==
Guam has qualified 5 athletes.

Men

- Gen Imai
- Mario Manglona
- Vandric Castro
- Jerome Advincula

Women

- Kaiulani Cruz

== Rugby Sevens ==
Guam has qualified a women's team. Each team can consist of a maximum of 12 athletes.

Women

- Jennifer Farley
- Kayla Taguacta
- Kimberly Taguacta
- Maria Sgro
- Tiffany Tallada
- Stephanie Tanh
- Tasi Ada
- Kimberly Sherman
- Cera Taguacta

== Surfing ==
Guam has qualified 6 athletes.

Men

- Richmond Arciaga
- Charles Ikehara
- Derrick Ikehara
- Frederick Mendiola
- Cheyne Purcell
- Edward Santiago III

== Swimming ==
Guam has qualified 9 athletes.

Men

- Pierson Cruz
- Christopher Duenas
- Rioin Oshiro
- Johnny Rivera
- Benjamin Schulte - 1500m Freestyle

Women

- Jenina Cruz
- Jessica Jones
- Province Poppe
- Pilar Shimizu

== Table Tennis ==
Guam has qualified 2 athletes.

Men

- Arman Burgos
- Edwin Cadag

== Taekwondo ==
Guam has qualified 5 athletes.

Men

- Joseph Ho - -54 kg
- Gilbert Pascua
- Terrence Lapitan - -58 kg
- Vincent Garrido

Women

- Hang Pham - -49 kg

== Triathlon ==
Guam has qualified 5 athletes.

Men

- Joseph Dela Cruz
- Peter Lombaed II - Mixed Team Sprint
- Mark Walters - Mixed Team Sprint

Women

- Kelly Dawes
- Chiyo Lombard - Mixed Team Sprint

== Volleyball ==
=== Beach Volleyball ===
Guam has qualified a men's team. Each team can consist of a maximum of 2 members.

Men

- David Rillera Jr
- Brian Matanane

=== Indoor Volleyball ===
Guam has qualified a men's and women's team. Each team can consist of a maximum of 12 members.

Men

- Kylon Eckert
- Charles Macias
- Kenneth Leon Guerrero
- Raymond Mantanona
- Nikolaus Chaco
- Micah Herron
- John Taimanglo
- Miles Herron
- Steven Finona
- Joshua Cruz
- Robert Borden
- Tristan Tapia

Women

- Crista Nauta
- Charmaine Garcia
- Colleen Flores
- Gemma Datuin
- Estella Blass
- Shanniqua Mendiola
- Jesse Pinkston
- Catherine Aquinde
- Amy Atkinson
- Naomi Blaz
- Pollara Cobb
