= Rita Barceló =

Spanish religious sister

Servant of God Rita Barceló
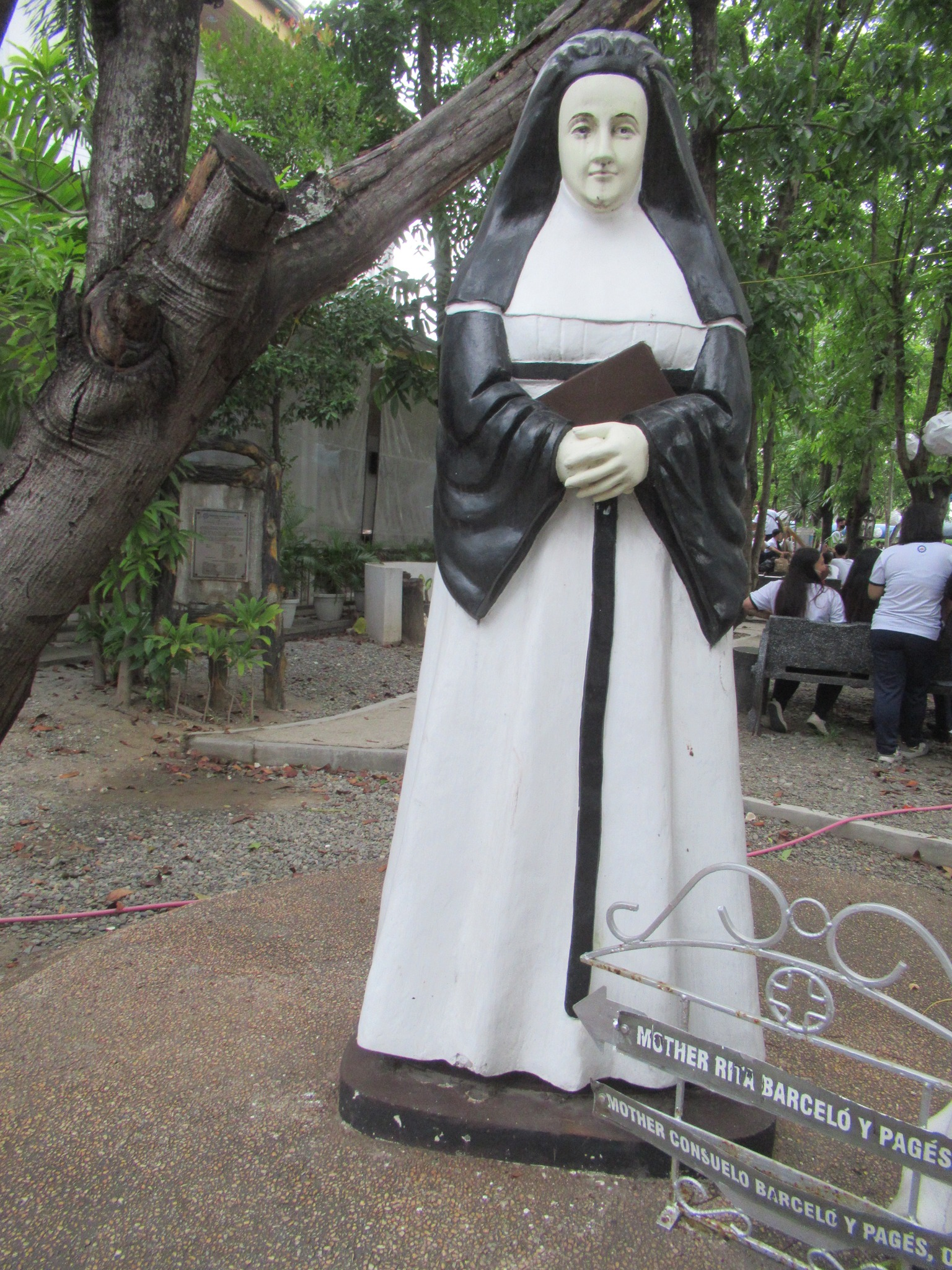
- Born: Rita Barcelo y Pages; Ines Joaquina Vicenta Barcelo y Pages; April 20, 1843; Sarrià, Barcelona, Spain
- Died: May 14, 1904 (aged 61); Barcelona, Spain

Rita Barcelo y Pages (20 April 1843 - 14 May 1904) was the Spanish foundress of the Augustinian Sisters of Our Lady of Consolation. The ASOLC was established in 1882 to help Filipinos during a cholera epidemic. She was the sister of Consuelo Barcelo, who was the cofounder of the community. A beatification process has been opened.

== Beatfication process ==
After Mother Consuelo was given the title of a Venerable in December 2012, the Congregation for the Causes of Saints announced already a close opening for the process of Mother Rita. Her cause for beatification was proposed by the Augustinians and of the Congregation of the Augustinian Sisters. She is regarded a Servant of God.

== See also ==
- List of Filipinos venerated in the Catholic Church
