= Juan de los Reyes =

Spanish Catholic priest and missionary (c.1652–76)

Juan de los Reyes (c. 1652 – 1676) was a Filipino Spanish Catholic priest and evangelist who was among the protomartyrs of Guam.

== Biography ==
De los Reyes was the next Kapampangan victim along with Sebastián de Monroy, five Mexican soldiers, and a Spaniard. On Sunday, 6 September 1676, de los Reyes and the missionary team were killed as they were about to board a boat in the western village of Sumay (now part of Naval Base Guam of the United States Navy) bound for Hagåtña, the island's capital to the northeast. They were slain with a hail of stones, clubs and spears thrown by the indigenous Chamorro people whom they had tried to convert.
