= Mark Ji Tianxiang =

Chinese Catholic saint and doctor

Saint Mark Ji Tianxiang 馬克冀天祥
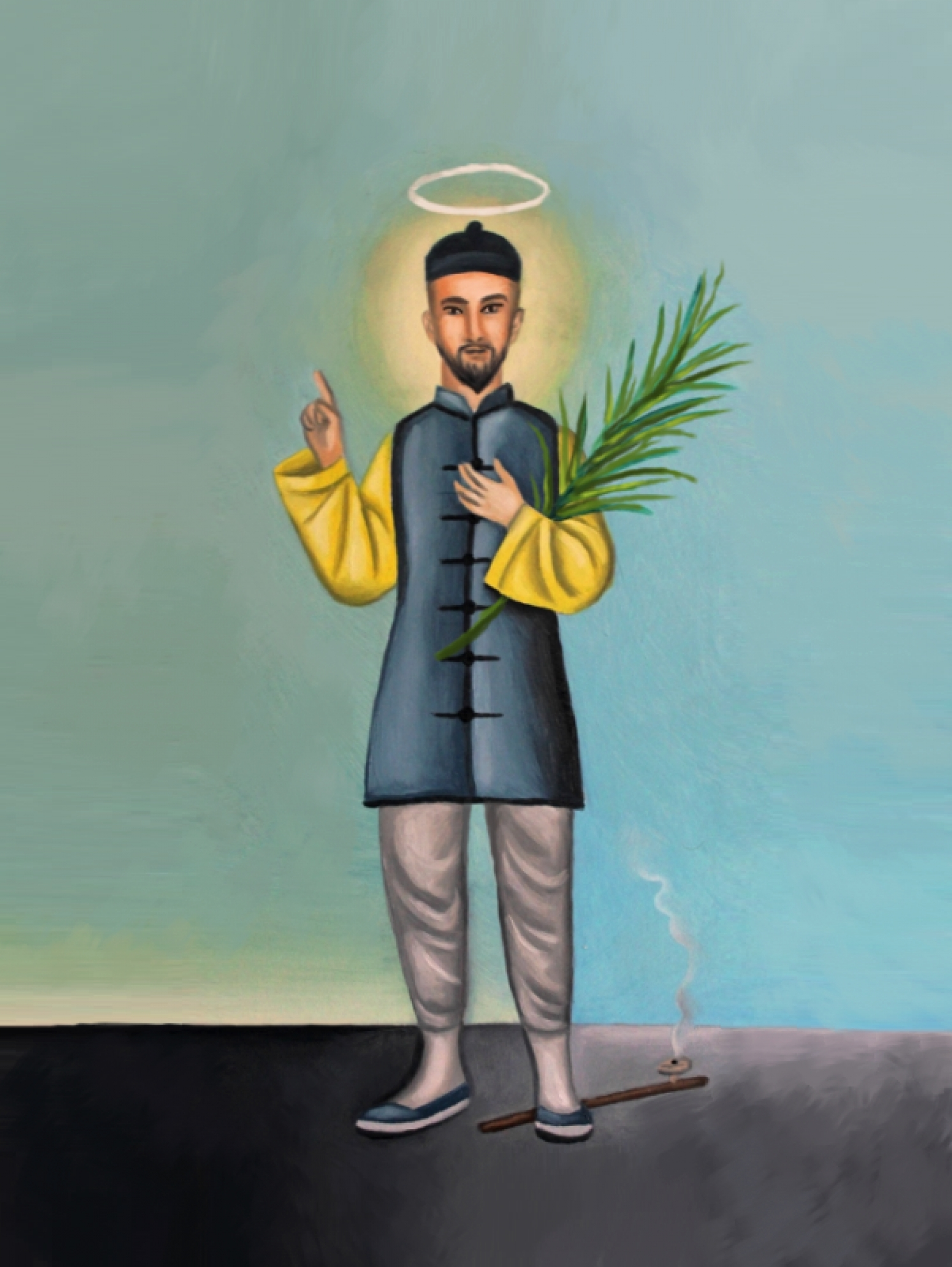

Martyr
- Born: 1834; Jizhou District, Hengshui, Hebei, China
- Died: 9 July 1900 (aged 65–66); Jizhou District, Hengshui, Hebei, China
- Venerated in: Catholic Church
- Beatified: 24 November 1946, Saint Peter's Square, Vatican City by Pope Pius XII
- Canonized: 1 October 2000, Saint Peter's Square, Vatican City by Pope John Paul II
- Feast: 9 July
- Patronage: Drug Addicts

Mark Ji Tianxiang was a Chinese lay Catholic and doctor. He was martyred during the Boxer Rebellion and had been an opium addict. He was canonized in 2000 by Pope John Paul II.

== Early life and career ==
Ji was born in Jizhou District, Hengshui, Zhili (now Hebei), China in 1834. He was a medical doctor and contracted a violent stomach ailment, for which he treated himself with opium. This was a routine treatment at the time, but he became addicted to the drug at a time when addiction was considered shameful and gravely scandalous. He was a pious Catholic, frequenting the sacrament of Confession and spending time in prayer, attending Mass, and providing free treatment to his patients. Despite his frequent confessions, he was denied Absolution by his confessor and consequently could not receive the Blessed Sacrament because his confessor believed he lacked contrition for his addiction. He did not receive the Blessed Sacrament for 30 years, but finally after 30 years of being a faithful and regular church-goer, he was able to receive the sacraments.

== Martyrdom ==
On 9 July 1900, during the Boxer Rebellion, Ji and 119 other Christians were rounded up and asked to renounce Christianity, but they refused. Ji begged the rebels to kill him last so that he could encourage his family to die as martyrs. He remained standing at the side of every one of them until the very last beheading was carried out, so that they would not have to die alone. Ji did not renounce his Catholic faith and was beheaded.

== Canonization ==
Mark Ji Tianxiang was beatified on 24 November 1946 by Pope Pius XII along with 120 other Chinese martyrs, including Augustine Zhao Rong, and other Chinese Martyrs, who were canonized by Pope John Paul II on 1 October 2000.
