= José María of Manila =

Filipino blessed and Martyr

Blessed José María of Manila OFMCap
- José María in the 1930s

Martyr
- Born: Eugenio del Sanz-Orozco Mortera; 5 September 1880; Manila, Captaincy General of the Philippines
- Died: 17 August 1936 (aged 55); Madrid, Spain
- Venerated in: Catholic Church
- Beatified: 13 October 2013, Tarragona, Spain by Cardinal Angelo Amato (on behalf of Pope Francis)
- Major shrine: Saint Francis of Assisi Parish, Mandaluyong City
- Feast: 6 November
- Attributes: Franciscan habit Crown of Martyrdom; Martyr's palm Rosary

José María of Manila (Spanish: José María de Manila : 5 September 1880, Manila – 17 August 1936, Madrid) was a Criollo Catholic priest and friar of the Order of Friars Minor Capuchin. He was martyred in Spain during the early phase of the Spanish Civil War, and is the third Filipino to have been declared blessed by the Roman Catholic Church.

== Biography ==
Eugenio Sanz-Orozco was born in Manila, Philippines on 5 September 1880 to Spanish parents Don Eugenio del Saz-Orozco de la Oz, the last Spanish Mayor of Manila, and Doña Felisa Mortera y Camacho. His early education took place at Ateneo de Manila University, Colegio de San Juan de Letran, and University of Santo Tomas.

He left the Philippines when he was 16 years old to study in Spain. His father wanted him to become a lawyer. He obtained his degree, and practised law for a few months. He then decided he wanted to be a priest. He was ordained on 30 November 1910. He came to be known as José María of Manila.

He desired to return home to the Philippines to serve the local Philippine Church, despite the fall of the Spanish East Indies government in 1898 during the Philippine Revolution. Circumstances prevented him from returning. He resolved to proclaim the Gospel in Spain, which was still suffering from poverty brought about by World War I.

Anti-clericalism escalated in Spain during the 1930s. A military coup in July 1936 precipitated the Spanish Civil War and the Terror Rojo that continued until the end of the conflict. On 17 August 1936, José María was executed by a leftist faction at the gardens of the Cuartel de la Montaña, a military building in Madrid.

== Beatification ==
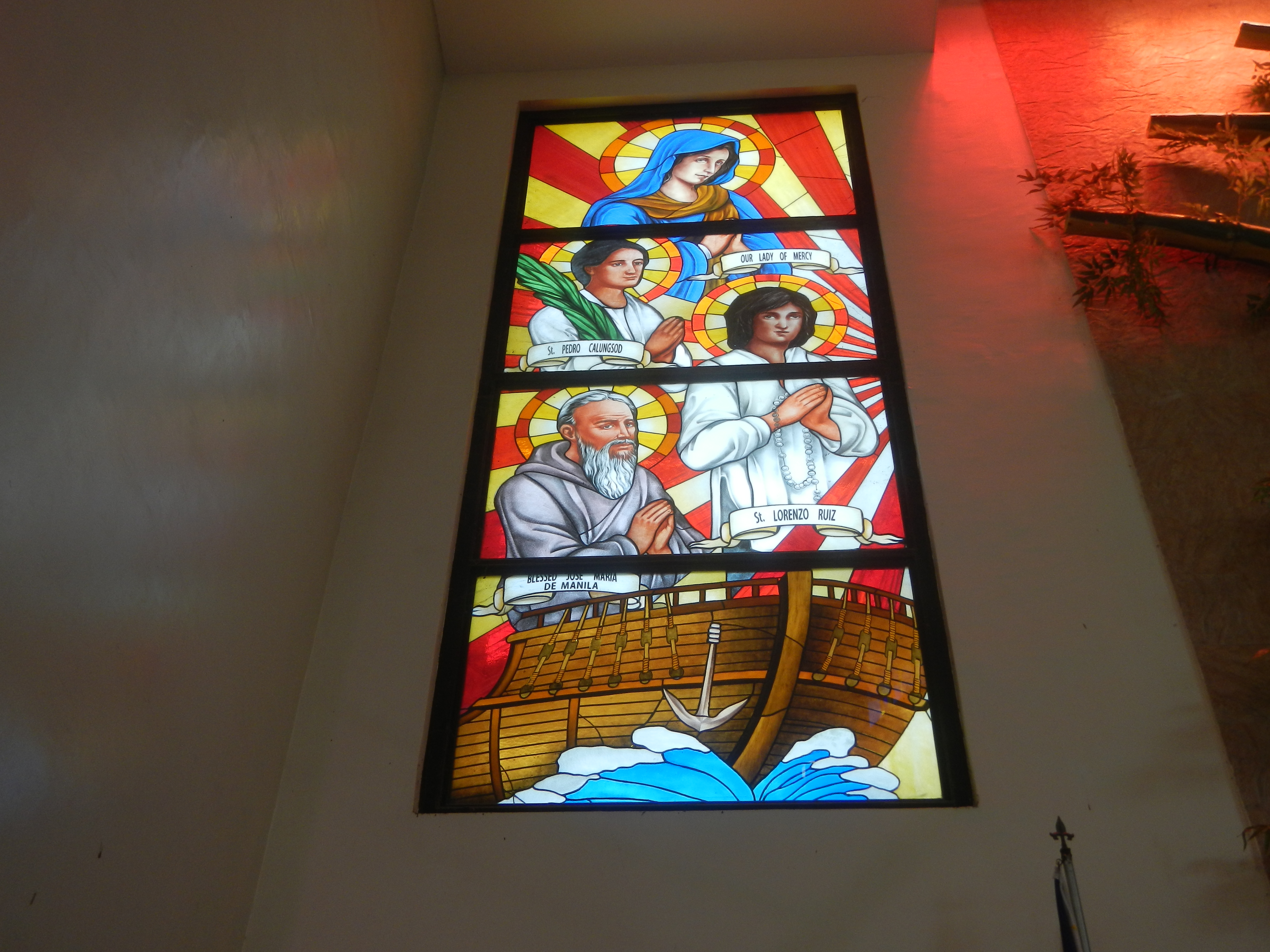
Stained glass with Blessed Jose Maria de Manila on the lower left.

On 27 March 2013, Pope Francis approved the findings of the Congregation for the Causes of Saints that José María and 521 other companions were killed because of their Roman Catholic faith, clearing the way for their beatification. They were beatified on 13 October 2013 in Tarragona, Spain.

== See also ==
- List of Filipinos venerated in the Catholic Church
- Martyrs of the Spanish Civil War
