= Consuelo Barceló =

Spanish nun (1857–1940)

Venerable Consuelo Barceló OSA
- Born: Joaquina María Mercedes Barceló y Pagés; July 24, 1857; Barcelona, Spain
- Died: August 4, 1940 (aged 83); Manila, Philippines

Joaquina María Mercedes Barceló y Pagés (July 24, 1857 - July 31, 1940), better known as Consuelo Barceló, was a Roman Catholic Spanish Augustinian tertiary who cofounded the Augustinian Sisters of Our Lady of Consolation along with her sister, Rita Barceló, in the Philippines. Born on July 24, 1857, and died on August 4, 1940, at the age of 83 in Manila.

== Life and mission ==
Consuelo Barcelo was born on July 24, 1857, in Sarriá, Barcelona, Spain, to Salvador Barceló y Roces and Maria Pagés y Campanya. Her siblings were Salvador, Joaquin, Ana Maria and Ignes Joaquina Vicenta, (the future Mother Rita Barceló).

Joaquina studied for fourteen years and was an intern at the Colegio de las Esclavas del Sagrado Corazon de Jesus (The Slaves of the Sacred Heart of Jesus) in Barcelona. Despite her outgoing personality, she felt a calling to the contemplative life like her eldest sister, Ana Maria. She entered the Monasterio de las Comendadoras de San Juan de Jerusalén in Barcelona. The recurrence of an abscess in her knee forced her to leave the monastery. However, when the Agustinian siters were invited to go to the Philippines to take care of young girls, orphaned because of the cholera epidemic, her desire for convent life was rekindled.

She entered the Beaterio de Mantelatas de San Agustin of Barcelona as a postulant and joined the second group of sisters who left for Manila on September 1, 1883, and reached Manila on October 5, 1883. On November 21, 1883, she received the Augustinian habit of the tertiary order at the chapel of the orphanage in Mandaluyong. She was given the name Sor Maria de la Consolacion and was called Sor Consuelo upon her entrance to the novitiate. Her profession of temporary vows was initiated despite questions from the Archbishop of Manila and Sor Antonia Campillo, the superior. The Augustinian priests pushed through with the simple ceremonies in the chapel of the Asilo in Mandaluyong on December 26, 1884. Her sponsor was Doña Maria del Carmen Ayala de Roxas. Consuelo was the first peninsular woman, that is, a lady born in Spain, to be clothed and to profess in the Philippines. At the Asilo, she provided the children with food, shelter, clothing, and education. She also spent a great deal of time giving music lessons. She had a gift of making the girls feel at ease with her.

When the local community was divided into two, Sor Consuelo opted to remain in the Asilo or orphanage in Mandaluyong with Sor Monica, Sor Remedios, and Sor Rita who was their superior. The rest of the sisters were sent to the Beaterio de Santa Rita in Pasig, together with the paying students. Life in Manila was difficult. Of the original seven sisters sent from Barcelona in 1883, only the two Barceló sisters remained. To replenish the number of sisters for the Asilo, Sor Rita, with Sor Consuelo, proposed two simultaneous sources of workers for the lord’s vineyard: a novitiate in Spain (Agustinas Misioneras de Ultramar, which the surviving sisters founded upon their return to Barcelona) and another one in the Philippines for the formation of native sisters. Native vocations to the religious life were accepted as early as 1885. Mother Consuelo served as their mistress of novices.

Fearing reprisals from the revolutionaries upon the discovery of the Katipunan in 1896, the Barceló sisters and the Filipino sisters prayed ardently to their patroness, Our Lady of Consolation. No untoward incident occurred anywhere near the premises of the orphanage. When the 1898 revolution broke out, Mother Consuelo was already the superior of the Colegio-Asilo while Mother Rita was the mistress of novices. During the Filipino-American war, Mother Consuelo, the sisters, and their almost 200 orphan-wards left the Asilo on June 11, 1898. They fled towards Manila.

When the Americans came, the Augustinian provincial officially dissolved the sisters' community, as well as their Colegio-Asilo. Mother Rita and mother Consuelo, bound by strict obedience, left the Philippines for Spain on March 13, 1899. The Filipino sisters were left "with neither a house nor a single cent nor the hope of acquiring it." But they resolved to stay together to preserve their community. They were supported by the daughters of charity, especially Mother Maria Ocariz. The Filipino sisters applied for affiliation with the Agustinas Misioneras in Madrid. They also applied with the Beaterio de Barcelona, but their applications were denied.

The Hermanas Agustinas Terciarias de las Islas Filipinas received on May 31, 1902, the official aggregation to the Augustinian Order by the Prior General in Rome. This was upon the recommendation of Mother Rita before she died in Barcelona.

On January 11, 1904, Bernabe Jimenez, the then spiritual director of the Filipino sisters, wrote Mother Consuelo informing her that the apostolic delegate, who had received petitions from the Filipino sisters in Manila for her and for Mother Rita’s return, had approved the petitions. But Mother Rita died on May 14, 1904, before she could return to the Philippines. On June 18, 1904, Mother Consuelo returned to the Philippines alone.

Upon Mother Consuelo’s return to the Philippines, she was at first appointed superior of the new novitiate house of St. Joseph in Sta. Ana, Manila. She later became the prioress of the sisters of Colegio de la Consolacion, Manila, until 1915 when she was elected the first Superior General. She served in this capacity for five terms serving as such for 25 years until her death. The college was totally destroyed by fire on December 26, 1909, prompting the sisters to take refuge in Santa Isabel College and Santa Rita College. Incidentally, on February 12, 1910, Colegio de la Consolacion received "government recognition", becoming the first private school to be recognized by the department of education during the American rule.

== Death ==
On July 31, 1940, she suffered two strong heart attacks and was brought to the hospital. Michael J. O'Doherty, DD went to pay her a visit when she was already unconscious. On seeing the sisters weeping, he remarked: "Why do you weep? You should be glad to have in heaven a saint to intercede for you. If Sor Consuelo is not a saint, then there is no saint in heaven."

Mother Consuelo died in the morning of August 4, 1940, at the age of 83. Her remains were exposed in the chapel of Colegio de la Consolacion, Manila, where hundreds of girls both young and old came to offer their last tribute of love and gratitude. Her burial was a triumph rather than a funeral.

== Legacy ==
The principal theological virtue that characterises the life and death of Mother Consuelo Barceló is the love for God and neighbour. Throughout her life, Barceló's words and actions were filled with charity and a deep love of God. This is demonstrated, for example, in the way she treated her religious sisters, sisters of other congregations, and priests, as well as orphans, working girls, and the poor. She felt particularly called to caring for the poor as seen in her exhortations to sisters to open their hearts to them.

The cardinal virtue that is foremost in her life is justice – both human and divine. This parallels the theological virtue of love of God and neighbor. She loved people so that she desired to give them what was their due. She loved God so that she gave to God, to the church, and to her institute what belonged to each of them. Coupled with justice is her prudence, fortitude and temperance which enabled her to judge justly and decide lovingly for the needs and concerns of the congregation and her individual sisters.

She lived the evangelical counsels of obedience, poverty, and chastity. Regarded as daughter of St. Augustine for adherence to the rule and love for religious community life, which teaches sisters to be of one mind and one heart intent upon God.

== Beatification process ==
On September 30, 2002 a cause for Barceló’s beautification was opened at San Agustin Church. On December 20, 2012, she was declared venerable.

A miracle attributed to Barceló was the recovery of Chit Vizconde from a coma and organ failure in 2004. A prayer brigade had been launched by family, friends, and the nuns of the La Consolacion College requesting the intercession of Barceló.

== Gallery ==
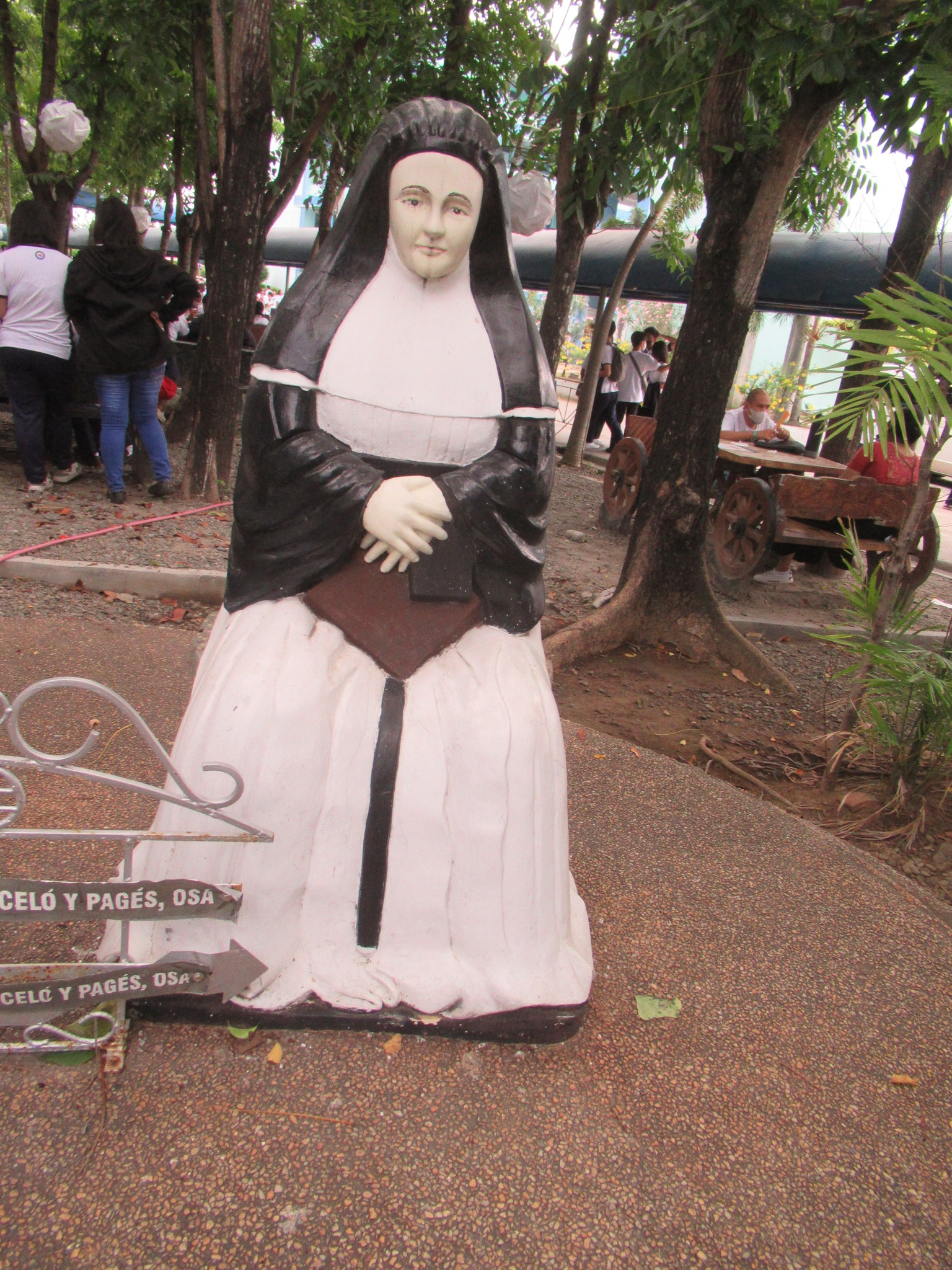
La Consolacion University Philippines

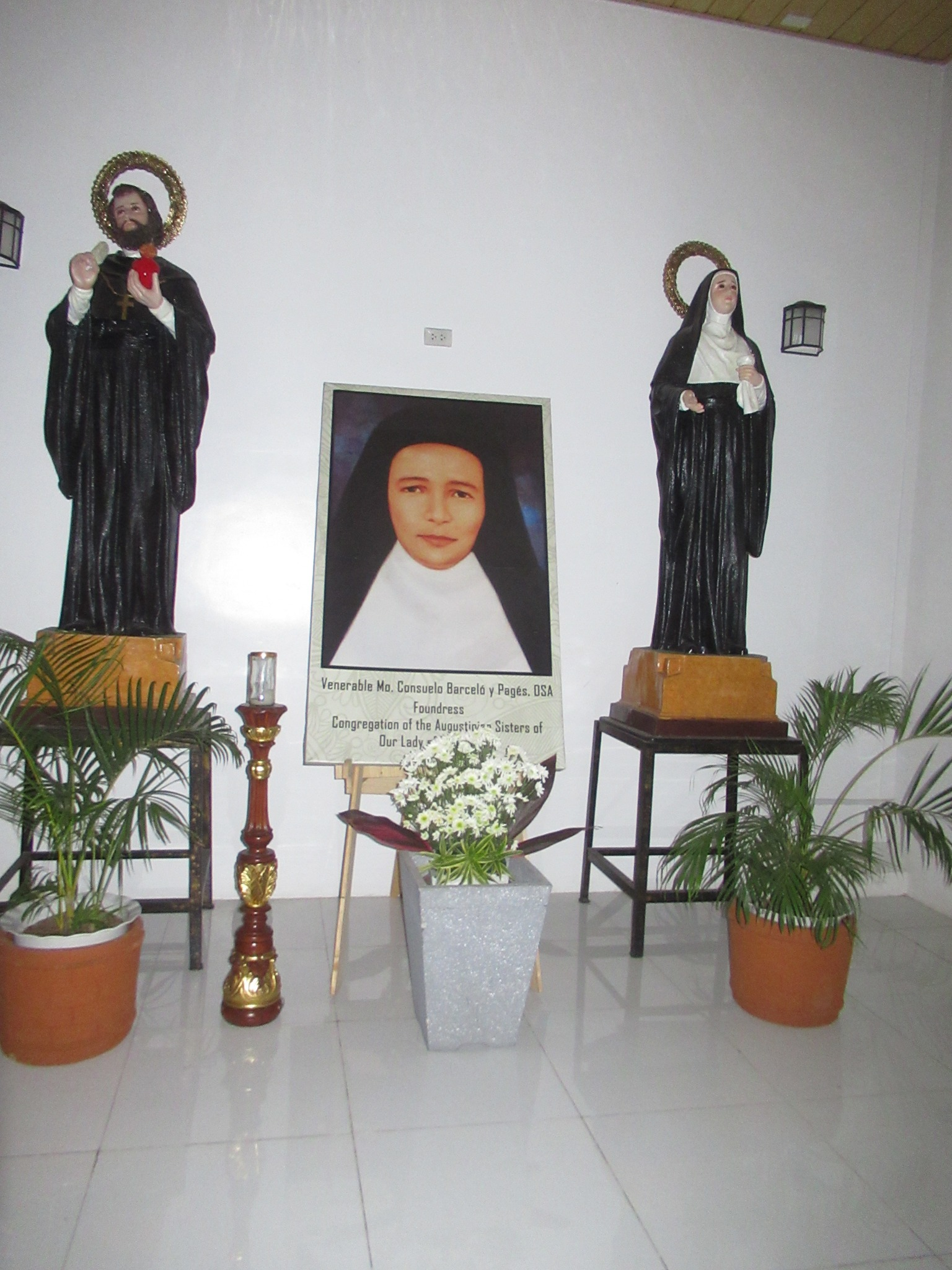
Our Lady of Consolation Chapel (La Consolacion University Philippines)

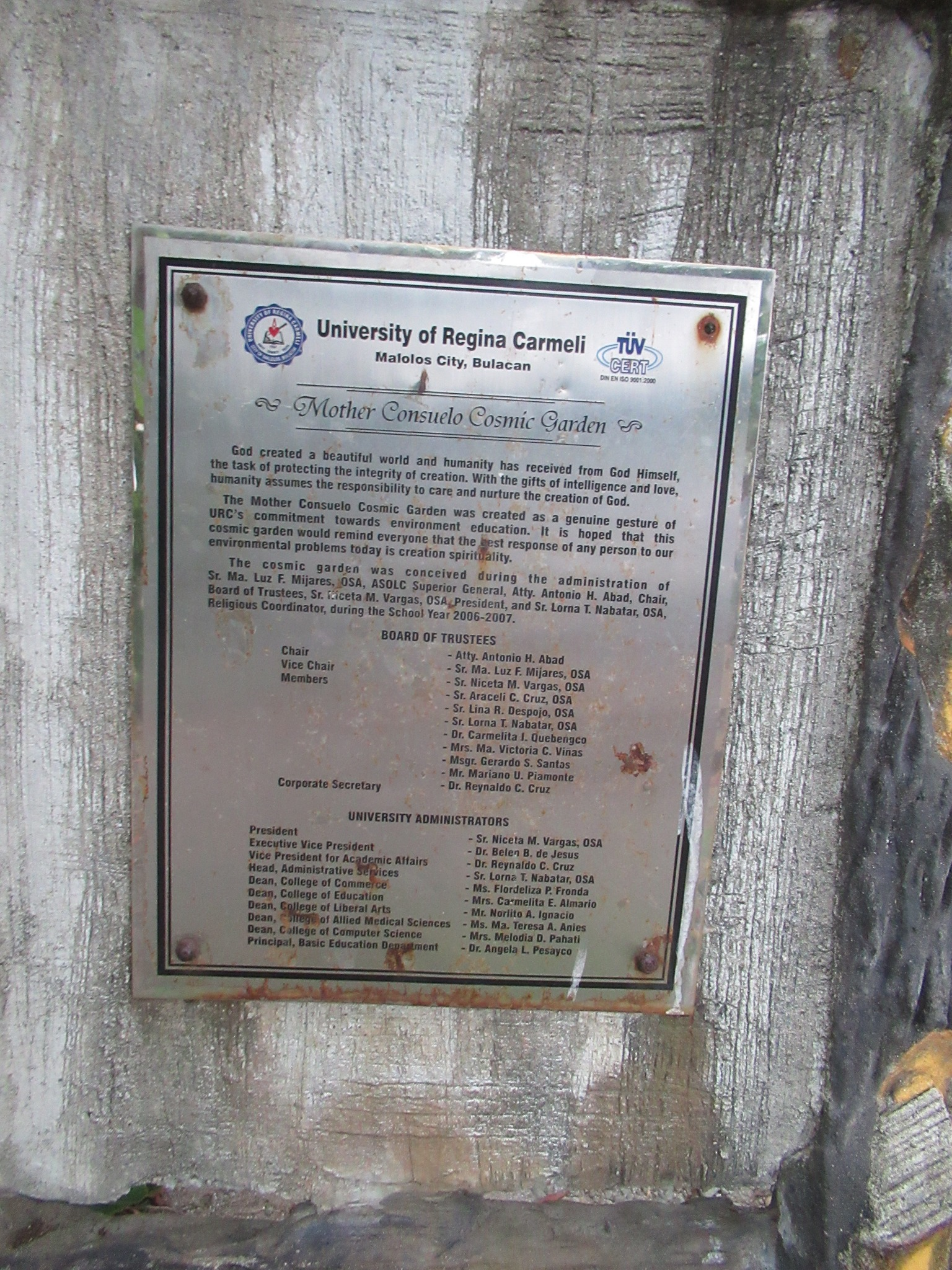
Historical marker of garden
