= List of flag bearers for Kiribati at the Olympics =

Kiribati at the Olympics
- IOC code: KIR
- NOC: Kiribati National Olympic Committee
- Website: www.oceaniasport.com/kiribati
- Medals: Gold 0 Silver 0 Bronze 0 Total 0

Summer appearances
- 2004; 2008; 2012; 2016; 2020; 2024

This is a list of flag bearers who have represented Kiribati at the Olympics.

Flag bearers carry the national flag of their country at the opening ceremony of the Olympic Games.

#	Event year	Season	Flag bearer	Sport
1	2004	Summer	Meamea Thomas	Weightlifting
2	2008	Summer	David Katoatau	Weightlifting
3	2012	Summer	David Katoatau	Weightlifting
4	2016	Summer	David Katoatau	Weightlifting
5	2020 (2021)	Summer	Kinaua Biribo	Judo
5	2020 (2021)	Summer	Ruben Katoatau	Weightlifting
6	2024	Summer	Kaimauri Erati	Weightlifting
6	2024	Summer	Nera Tiebwa	Judo

== See also ==
- Kiribati at the Olympics
