= Kiribati at the 2020 Summer Olympics =

- IOC code: KIR
- NOC: Kiribati National Olympic Committee
- Website: www.oceaniasport.com/kiribati

in Tokyo 23 July 2021 – 8 August 2021
- Competitors: 3 (2 men and 1 woman) in 3 sports
- Flag bearers (opening): Kinaua Biribo; Ruben Katoatau
- Flag bearer (closing): Ruben Katoatau
- Officials: 1
- Medals: Gold 0 Silver 0 Bronze 0 Total 0

Summer Olympics appearances (overview)
- 2004; 2008; 2012; 2016; 2020; 2024

Kiribati competed at the 2020 Summer Olympics in Tokyo. Originally scheduled to take place from 24 July to 9 August 2020, it was postponed to 23 July to 8 August 2021, due to the COVID-19 pandemic. The country's participation in Tokyo marked its fifth appearance at the Summer Olympics since its debut in 2004.

The Kiribati delegation consisted of three athletes: sprinter Lataisi Mwea, judoka Kinaua Biribo, and weightlifter Ruben Katoatau. Mwea qualified through a universality slot given by World Athletics, while Katoatau and Kinaua (Note: Kinaua Biribo is referred to by first name per cultural aspects.) were the highest ranked eligible Oceanian athletes in their categories. Kinaua and Katoatau were the flagbearers for the opening ceremony, while Katoatau solely held the flag at the closing ceremony. All three athletes did not medal, and as of these Games, Kiribati has yet to earn an Olympic medal.

== Background ==
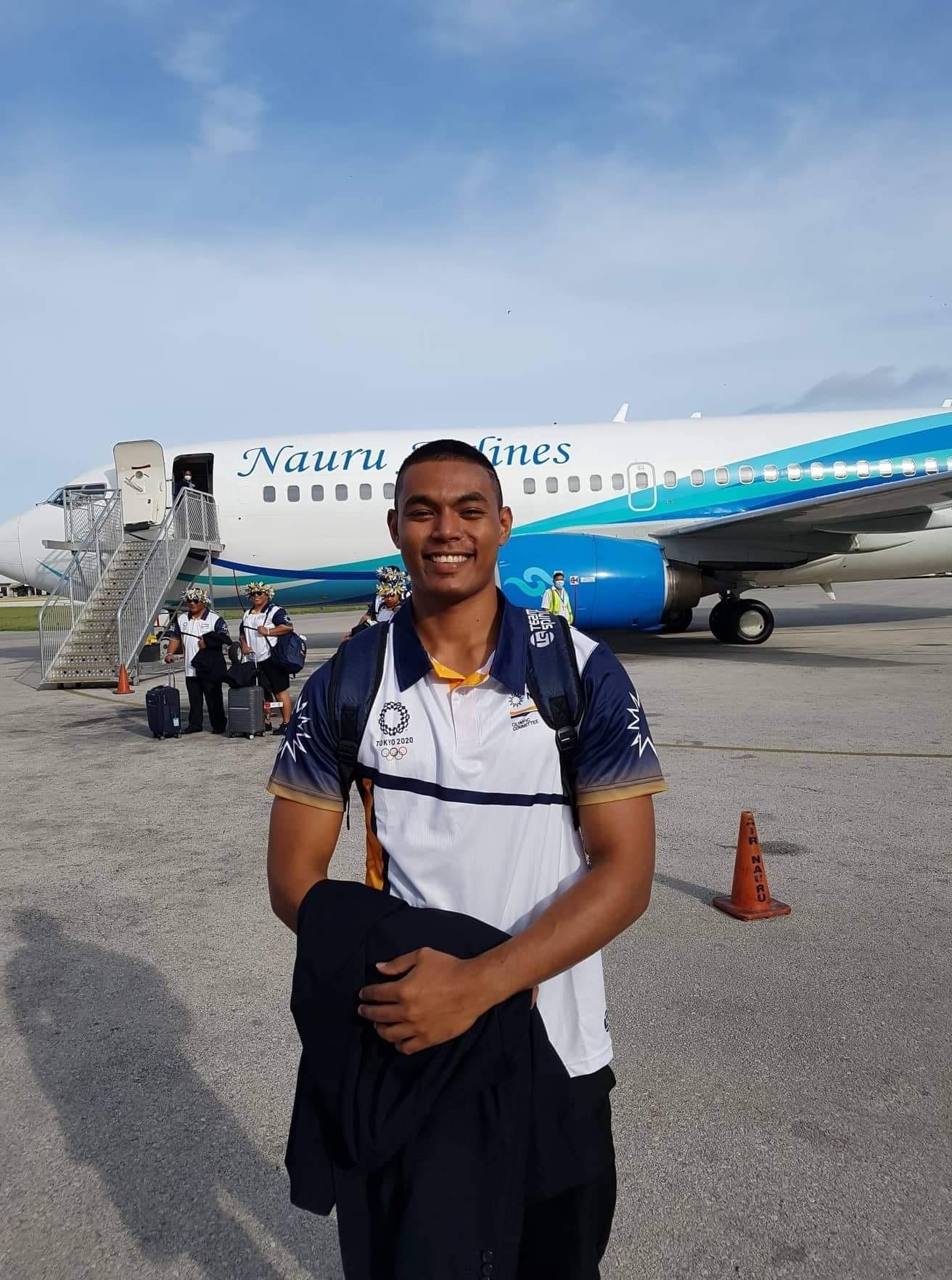
Nauruan athlete Jonah Harris in front of the IOC chartered airplane where the four delegations rode in

Originally scheduled to take place from 24 July to 9 August 2020, the Games were postponed to 23 July to 8 August 2021, due to the COVID-19 pandemic. This edition of the Games marked the nation's fifth appearance at the Summer Olympics ever since they debuted at the 2004 Summer Olympics held in Athens, Greece.

=== Travel ===
A coordination with the International Olympic Committee (IOC), the Oceania National Olympic Committees (ONOC) of Nauru, Kiribati, Solomon Islands, and Tuvalu, and Nauru Airlines, used the airline to charter two flights with four national delegations, namely: Nauru, Kiribati, Solomon Islands, and Tuvalu, with a technical stop in Chuuk State of the Federated States of Micronesia, for travel to Tokyo due to precautions brought on by the COVID-19 pandemic. Delegations from Kiribati, Solomon Islands, and Tuvalu were brought to Nauru on 19 July 2021, while the following day saw all of the delegations' departure to the Haneda Airport in Tokyo.

Two athletes, namely: Lataisi Mwea and Kinaua Biribo, and coach Leanne Hines were the only people in the Kiribati delegation to not take part in the IOC chartered flight. Kinaua was in Budapest, Hungary for training since March 2021 and flew to the nation on 19 July 2021, while Mwea and Hines flew in from Australia to Tokyo on 26 June 2021.

=== Delegation ===
Kiribati decided to send only athletes who have been abroad throughout the COVID-19 pandemic, amid fears its competitors might bring the virus back home. All of Kiribati's athletes at these Games were beneficiaries of Australian aid from the PacificAus Sports Program and the Australian Olympic Committee, and were with the Australian team in Tokyo.

The Kiribati delegation composed of eight people, the biggest ever by the nation. The only official present at the Games was chef de mission and two-time Fijian Olympian Josateki Naulu. Other officials were Kiribati National Olympic Committee president Nicholas McDermott and delegation secretary general Tenoa Betene, though they are not part of the official contingent. Coaches present were athletics coach Leanne Hinese, judo coach Michael Liptrot, judo training partner Alexander Haecker, and weightlifting coach and three-time Olympian David Katoatau. The athletes that competed were sprinter Lataisi Mwea, judoka Kinaua Biribo, and weightlifter Ruben Katoatau.

Mwea was the last Kiribati athlete to compete at the Games. No athlete from Kiribati has yet earned an Olympic medal.

=== Opening and closing ceremonies ===
The Kiribati delegation marched 55th out of 206 countries in the 2020 Summer Olympics Parade of Nations within the opening ceremony, due to the host's use of the local kana alphabetical system. (Note: Japanese: キリバス, romanized: Kiribasu) Kinaua and Katoatau held the flag for the delegation in the ceremony. At the closing ceremony, Katoatau was the designated flagbearer for the nation.

Back in the nation, the Kiribati National Olympic Committee (KNOC) hosted an event in Tarawa to support the athletes at the opening ceremony of the Games. The KNOC invited local sport federations and fans to watch a livestream of the ceremony, and invited local celebrities, dancers, and comedians to perform for the event.

== Athletics ==
Kiribati received universality slots from World Athletics to send two athletes (one male and one female) to the Olympics, which allows a National Olympic Committee to send athletes despite not meeting the standard qualification criteria. Though the nation only sent one male athlete, sprinter Lataisi Mwea, who would compete in the men's 100 metres. Mwea usually competes in the high jump, holding the national record in the high jump with 2.00 metres, though through a 12-month training program in Gold Coast, Australia, he trained for sprinting events in order to qualify for a universality slot for the nation.

Mwea competed in his event on 31 July 2021, running in the first preliminary heat in the second lane. He finished with a time of 11.25 seconds, ultimately finishing second to last in his preliminary heat. He did not advance. The eventual gold medal winner was Marcell Jacobs of Italy, who set a new European record in the event.

Key

- Note–Ranks given for track events are within the athlete's heat only
- Q = Qualified for the next round
- q = Qualified for the next round as a fastest loser or, in field events, by position without achieving the qualifying target
- NR = National record
- N/A = Round not applicable for the event
- Bye = Athlete not required to compete in round

Track & road events

Athlete	Event	Preliminaries		Heat		Quarterfinal		Semifinal		Final	
Athlete	Event	Result	Rank	Result	Rank	Result	Rank	Result	Rank	Result	Rank
Lataisi Mwea	Men's 100 m	11.25	8	Did not advance							

== Judo ==
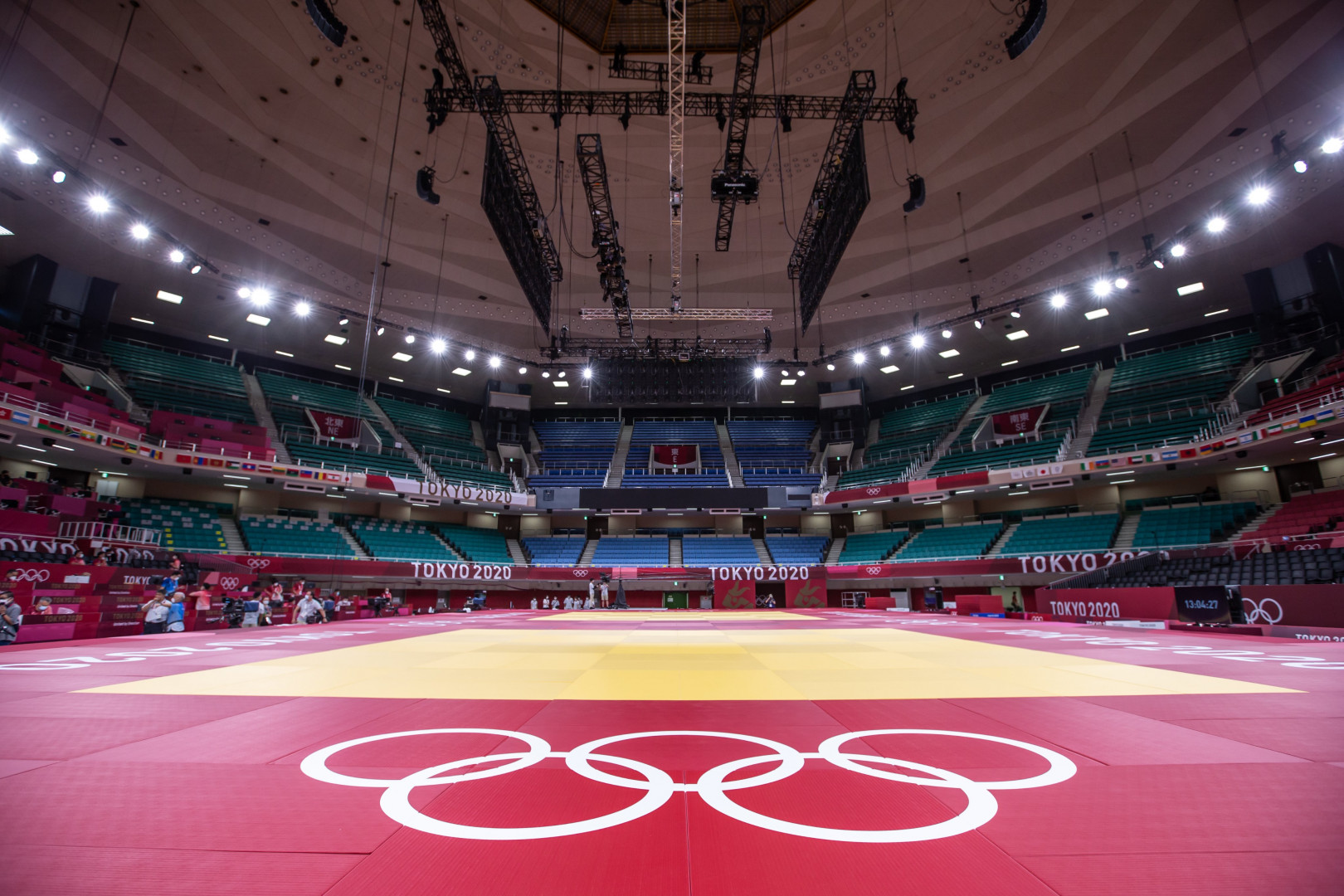
The Nippon Budokan, where Kinaua competed in her event

Kiribati sent one female judoka to the Games based on the International Judo Federation Olympics Individual Ranking. The nation selected judoka Kinaua Biribo, who scored only 30 points in the qualification period yet qualified as the highest eligible Oceanian athlete, which marked the nation's Olympic debut in this sport. Kinaua was relatively new to the sport, picking it up in 2019 after being a wrestler. She trained abroad in multiple locations, starting in Japan, being coached by Shigeru Kimura, then Russia, then Budapest, Hungary, until the pandemic happened and she had to be coached online through Zoom calls with her coach, Michael Liptrot. The lead-up to the Games saw her participation at the 2021 World Judo Championships held in Budapest, Hungary. She ranked 177 in the world in the lead-up to the Games.

Kinaua competed in her event on 28 July 2021. In her first match, she faced Aoife Coughlan of Australia in the round of 32. Kinaua was defeated in 52 seconds through an ippon, and did not advance. The eventual winner was Chizuru Arai of Japan.

The nation has one of the worst cases of domestic and gender-based violence in the world, with 68% of women aged 15–49 who have been in a relationship saying that they have experienced some sort of violence from a partner, 90% who had experienced controlling behaviour from a partner, and 10% from someone who was not their partner. Kinaua was abducted and sexually assaulted when she was six years old, and she stated that she wanted to use her participation at the Games and her sport to motivate women back in the nation to bring to light the issues of domestic and gender-based violence. She also used her participation to address rising sea levels back in her country, being inspired by weightlifter David Katoatau who made headlines by using his participation at the Olympics for the same issue.

Athlete	Event	Round of 32	Round of 16	Quarterfinals	Semifinals	Repechage	Final / BM	
Athlete	Event	Opposition Result	Opposition Result	Opposition Result	Opposition Result	Opposition Result	Opposition Result	Rank
Kinaua Biribo	Women's –70 kg	Coughlan (AUS); L 00–01	Did not advance					

== Weightlifting ==
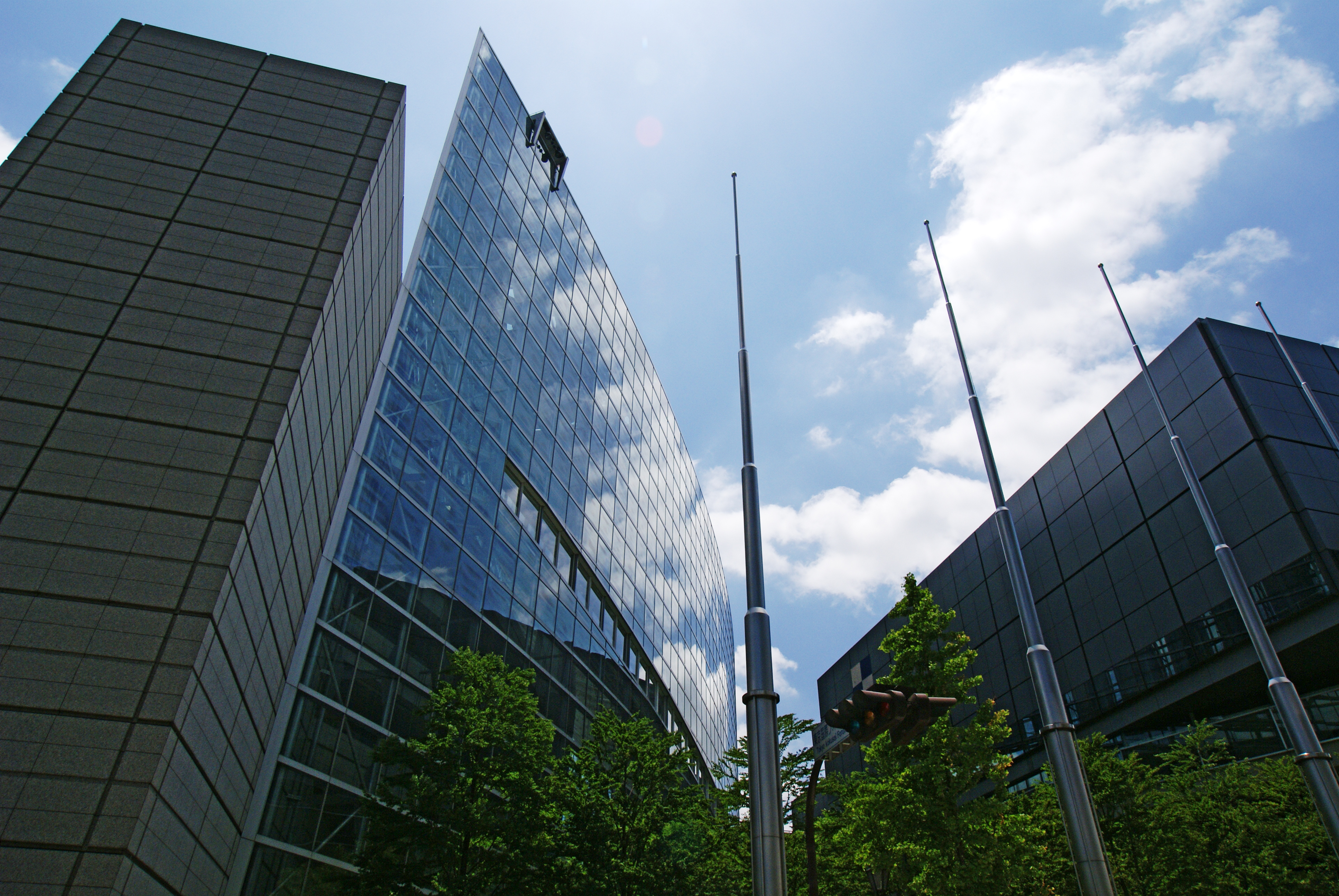
The Tokyo International Forum, where Katoatau competed in his event

Kiribati entered one male weightlifter into Olympic competition. Ruben Katoatau topped the list of weightlifters from Oceania in the men's 67 kg category based on the IWF Absolute Continental Rankings. At first, Katoatau ranked behind weightlifter Vaipava Nevo Ioane of Samoa, but withdrew from the Games due to the Samoa Association of Sports and National Olympic Committee decision to only sending athletes based overseas due to concerns over the COVID-19 pandemic. Before the Games, he trained in Nauru with his coach and brother, David Katoatau, who also trained there for his participation in the 2008, 2012, and 2016 Summer Olympics for the nation.

Katoatau competed in his event on 25 July 2021 in the B Group. He snatched 105 kilograms for his first attempt, then failed at his second and third attempts at 110 kilograms. He then clean and jerked 132 kilograms for his first attempt, then 140 kilograms for his second, then failed on his third and final attempt at 145 kilograms. He ended up with a 245 kilogram total, finishing 12th out of 12 finishers and 14 overall competitors. The gold medal was earned by Chen Lijun of China, setting new Olympic records in the clean and jerk, lifting 187 kilograms, and in the total with 332 kilograms.

Athlete	Event	Snatch		Clean & Jerk		Total	Rank
Athlete	Event	Result	Rank	Result	Rank	Total	Rank
Ruben Katoatau	Men's 67 kg	105	14	140	12	245	12
