= Kiribati at the Olympics =

- IOC code: KIR
- NOC: Kiribati National Olympic Committee
- Website: www.oceaniasport.com/kiribati
- Medals: Gold 0 Silver 0 Bronze 0 Total 0

Summer appearances
- 2004; 2008; 2012; 2016; 2020; 2024; 2028

The island nation of Kiribati first participated at the Summer Olympic Games in 2004 and has competed at every Summer Games since then. The nation has not participated at the Winter Olympic Games.

After participating in the Commonwealth Games for the first time in 1998, Kiribati started working towards membership of the International Olympic Committee. During a meeting of the IOC in Prague in 2003, Kiribati was accepted into the organization and was set to participate in the 2004 Summer games. The country's name was notably mispronounced by officials in all three languages—French, English and Greek—during the opening ceremony. Its delegation consisted of weightlifter Meamea Thomas and sprinters Kakianako Nariki (Kiribati's first Olympic competitor) and Kaitinano Mwemweata.

== History ==
Kiribati wanted to join the Olympics in the 1980s. Their National Olympic Committee was created in 2002, and approved by the IOC in 2003.

== Facilities and training ==
When the athletes train on their own, they typically run barefoot. The 80-90 I-Kiribati athletes have to share the ten pairs of shoes that they have when they train on their track, made of crushed coral. The lanes are black coral, with white beach sand sprinkled to mark the lanes. During the rainy season, the track floods, although the athletes still train on it.

The weightlifters do not have a gym to train in; they train behind their coach's house. If it starts raining, the weightlifters stop practicing.

== Medal tables ==
=== Medals by Summer Games ===
Games	Athletes	Gold	Silver	Bronze	Total	Rank
(Greece) 2004 Athens	3	0	0	0	0	–
(China) 2008 Beijing	2	0	0	0	0	–
(United Kingdom) 2012 London	3	0	0	0	0	–
(Brazil) 2016 Rio de Janeiro	3	0	0	0	0	–
(Japan) 2020 Tokyo	3	0	0	0	0	–
(France) 2024 Paris	3	0	0	0	0	–
(United States) 2028 Los Angeles	future event					
(Australia) 2032 Brisbane	future event					
Total (6/30)	17	0	0	0	0	–

== Flag bearers ==
- 2004 Athens: Meamea Thomas
- 2008 Beijing: David Katoatau
- 2012 London: David Katoatau
- 2016 Rio de Janeiro: David Katoatau
- 2020 Tokyo: Kinaua Biribo, Ruben Katoatau
- 2024 Paris: Kaimauri Erati, Nera Tiebwa
