= Kiribati at the 2026 Commonwealth Games =

- Flag of Kiribati
- CG code: KIR
- CGA: Kiribati National Olympic Committee
- Website: facebook.com/kiribatinoc (Facebook)

in Glasgow, Scotland 23 July 2026 – 2 August 2026
- Competitors: 10 in 4 sports
- Flag bearer: Tavita Kaoma
- Baton bearer: Andrew Kometa
- Medals: Gold 0 Silver 0 Bronze 0 Total 0

Commonwealth Games appearances (overview)
- 1998; 2002; 2006; 2010; 2014; 2018; 2022; 2026; 2030

Kiribati competed at the 2026 Commonwealth Games in Glasgow, Scotland. This marked Kiribati's eighth participation at the games, after making its debut at the 1998 Commonwealth Games.

The King's Baton relay stopped in Kiribati in February 2026.

On June 22, 2026, the Kiribati team of 10 athletes (seven men and three women) competing in four sports was officially named.

Boxer Tavita Kaoma was the country's flagbearer during the opening ceremony. Meanwhile, coach Andrew Kometa was the baton bearer during the opening ceremony.

== Competitors ==
The following is the list of number of competitors participating at the Games per sport/discipline.

Sport	Men	Women	Total
Athletics	1	1	2
Boxing	2	0	2
Judo	1	1	2
Weightlifting	3	1	4
Total	7	3	10

== Athletics ==
Kiribati entered two athletes (one per gender). Kenaz Kaniwete broke the Kiribati record in the men's 100 metres with a time of 10.86.

Key

Ranks given for track events are within the athlete's heat only.

- Q = Qualified for the next round
- q = Qualified for the next round as a fastest loser or, in field events, by position without achieving the qualifying target

Track events

Athlete	Event	Heat		Semifinal		Final	
Athlete	Event	Result	Rank	Result	Rank	Result	Rank
Kenaz Kaniwete	Men's 100 m	10.86 NR	6	Did not advance			
Aribeta Birita	Women's 100 m	13.85	7	Did not Advance			

== Boxing ==
Kiribati entered two male boxers.

Athlete	Event	Round of 32	Round of 16	Quarterfinals	Semifinals	Final	
Athlete	Event	Opposition Result	Opposition Result	Opposition Result	Opposition Result	Opposition Result	Rank
Eriu Temakau	Men's 55 kg	Teers (GGY); W 3–1	Mohammed (GHA); L RSC	Did not advance			
Tavita Kaoma	Men's 70 kg	Bye	Ah Tong (SAM); L RSC	Did not advance			

== Judo ==
Kiribati entered two judoka (one per gender).

Athlete	Event	Round of 16	Quarterfinals	Semifinals	Repechage	Final/BM
Athlete	Event	Opposition Result	Opposition Result	Opposition Result	Opposition Result	Rank
Tebania Mwemwenikeaki	Men's 60 kg	Gangaya (MRI); L 000–001	Did not advance			
Eritabeta Kourabi	Women's 57 kg	Delrieu (VAN); L 000–100	Did not advance			

== Weightlifting ==
Kiribati qualified two male weightlifters. Kiribati would later receive two additional quotas for one male and one female weightlifter.

Athlete	Event	Snatch (kg)		Clean & Jerk (kg)		Total (kg)	Rank
Athlete	Event	Result	Rank	Result	Rank	Total (kg)	Rank
Reinataake Takenteiti	Men's 60 kg	85	11	Did not finish			
Kaimauri Erati	Men's 65 kg	100	9	115	9	215	8
Ruben Katoatau	Men's 79 kg	129	9	Did not finish			
Tenganga Taunikarawa	Women's +86 kg	86	9	105	10	191	9
