= Kiribati at the 2024 Summer Olympics =

- IOC code: KIR
- NOC: Kiribati National Olympic Committee
- Website: www.oceaniasport.com/kiribati

in Paris, France 26 July 2024 – 11 August 2024
- Competitors: 3 (2 men and 1 woman) in 3 sports
- Flag bearers (opening): Kaimauri Erati & Nera Tiebwa
- Flag bearer (closing): Kaimauri Erati
- Medals: Gold 0 Silver 0 Bronze 0 Total 0

Summer Olympics appearances (overview)
- 2004; 2008; 2012; 2016; 2020; 2024; 2028

Kiribati competed at the 2024 Summer Olympics in Paris, France, which were held from 26 July to 11 August 2024. The country's participation in Paris marked its sixth appearance at the Summer Olympics since its debut in 2004. The athlete delegation of the country was composed of three people: Kaimauri Erati in weightlifting, Kenaz Kaniwete in athletics, and Nera Tiebwa in judo. Erati and Tiebwa were the flagbearers for the nation at the opening ceremony while Erati was the flagbearer at the closing ceremony. The delegation was supported by a collaboration between the Australian Government and the Australian Olympic Committee, which was made for the development of sport in Pacific nations.

Erati and Kaniwete qualified after receiving universality slots, while Tiebwa qualified after being one of the two highest ranked Oceanian judokas during the qualification period. Tiebwa competed first for the nation, competing in the women's 57 kg event but did not progress further after being defeated in the Round of 32. Then, Kaniwete competed in the men's 100 metres, running a personal best time in the preliminaries but did not advance further. Finally, Erati competed in the men's 61 kg event and placed seventh, the highest Olympic placement by an I-Kiribati athlete. Thus, Kiribati has yet to win an Olympic medal.

== Background ==
The games were held from 26 July to 11 August 2024, in the city of Paris, France. This edition of the games marked the nation's sixth appearance at the Summer Olympics since its debut at the 2004 Summer Olympics in Athens, Greece. The nation had never won a medal at the Olympics, with its best performance coming from weightlifter David Katoatau placing ninth men's 94 kg event at the 2012 Summer Olympics in London, Great Britain.

In the lead-up to the games, the Australian Government announced a collaboration with the Australian Olympic Committee to assist over 230 athletes from 13 Pacific nations (Note: Among the nations that were supported for the games included the Cook Islands, the Federated States of Micronesia, Kiribati, the Marshall Islands, Palau, Papua New Guinea, Samoa, Tonga, Tuvalu, and Vanuatu.) for the 2024 Summer Olympics and 2024 Summer Paralympics, which included Kiribati. The collaboration was made to create opportunities for said nations to compete in international competition, gain access to coaching, and to develop sports diplomacy. On 28 February 2024, the Australian High Commission in Kiribati collaborated with the Kiribati National Olympic Committee and the Ministry of Women, Youth, Sports and Social Affairs of Kiribati to announce support for 10 athletes with their training and for them to get the chance to compete in international competitions.

=== Opening and closing ceremonies ===
The Kiribati delegation came in 98th out of the 205 National Olympic Committees (NOCs) in the 2024 Summer Olympics Parade of Nations within the opening ceremony. Erati and Tiebwa held the flag for the delegation. At the closing ceremony, Erati held the flag.

== Competitors ==
List of I-Kiribati competitors at the 2024 Summer Olympics
Sport	Men	Women	Total
Athletics	1	0	1
Judo	0	1	1
Weightlifting	1	0	1
Total	2	1	3

== Athletics ==
=== Qualification and lead-up to the games ===
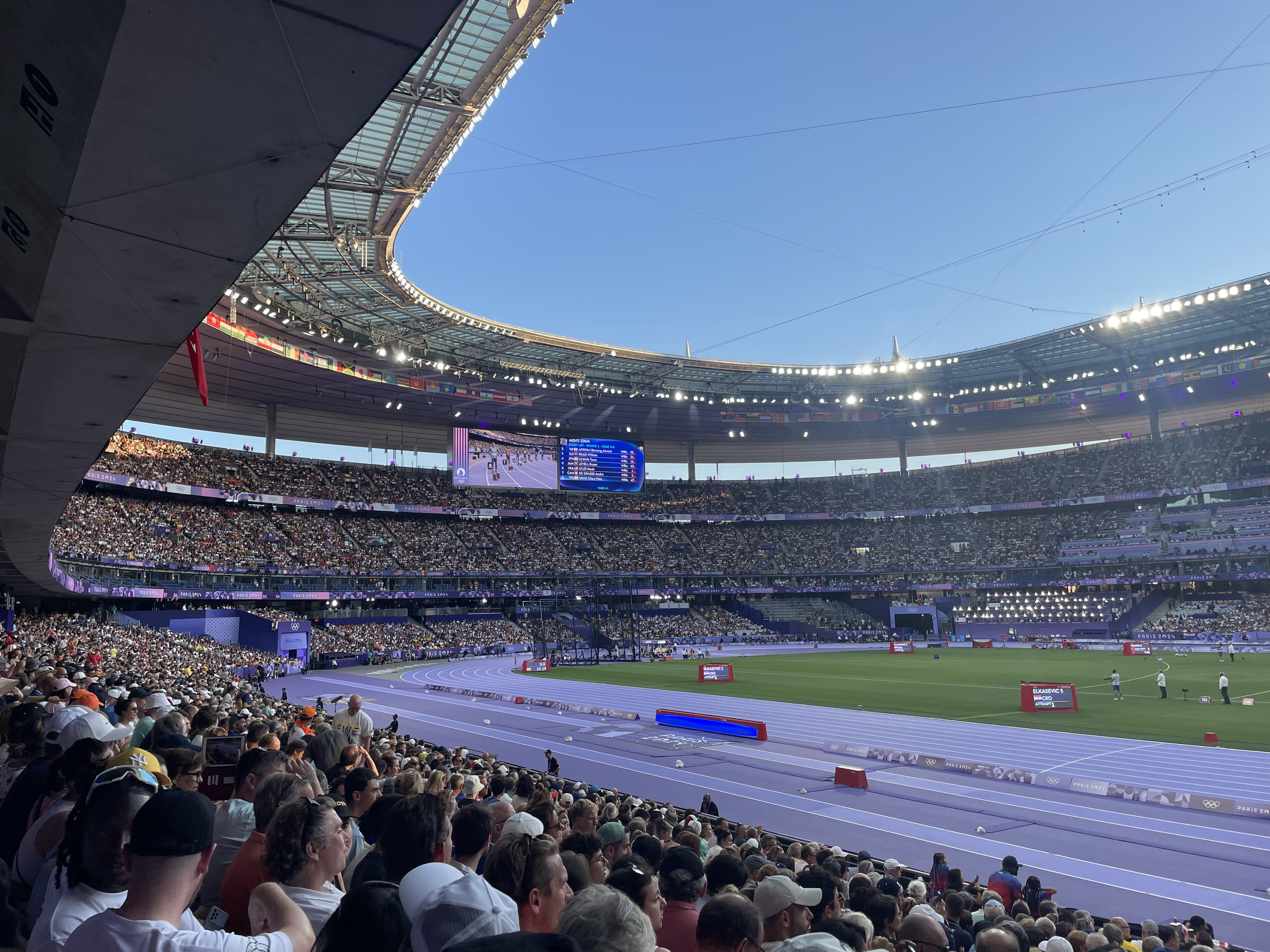
The Stade de France, where Kaniwete competed in his event

Kiribati was eligible for a universality slot to send an athletics competitor to the games, which allows an NOC to send athletes despite not meeting the standard qualification criteria. Kiribati sent sprinter Kenaz Kaniwete, who would compete in the men's 100 metres. The lead-up to the games saw Kaniwete compete at the 2023 Pacific Games in Honiara, Solomon Islands, where he made his debut and ran a personal best time of 23.49 seconds in the 200 metres, and the 2024 Oceania U18 Athletics Championships in Suva, Fiji, where he ran his personal best time of 11.35 seconds in the 100 metres. Before going to Paris, he was interviewed by UNICEF, where he stated his passion comes from representing his country at different competitions. He also desired for his peers to continue training to have the chance to represent the country at a future Summer Olympics. He trained in Tarawa before the games.

=== Event ===
Making his debut at an Olympic Games at sixteen years old, Kaniwete was the youngest competitor across the athletics events at the games. His event was held on 3 August at 10:42 a.m. at the Stade de France, where he raced in the second preliminary round heat against seven other competitors. He finished with a time of 11.29 seconds, placed fifth in the round but did not progress further. Despite not progressing, he set a new personal best and a national under-18 record in the event. Noah Lyles of the United States eventually won the gold in a time of 9.784 seconds.

Key

- Note–Ranks given for track events are within the athlete's heat only
- Q = Qualified for the next round
- q = Qualified for the next round as a fastest loser or, in field events, by position without achieving the qualifying target
- NR = National record
- N/A = Round not applicable for the event
- Bye = Athlete not required to compete in round

Track events

Athletics summary
Athlete	Event	Preliminary		Heat		Semifinal		Final	
Athlete	Event	Result	Rank	Result	Rank	Result	Rank	Result	Rank
Kenaz Kaniwete	Men's 100 m	11.29 PB	5	Did not advance					

== Judo ==
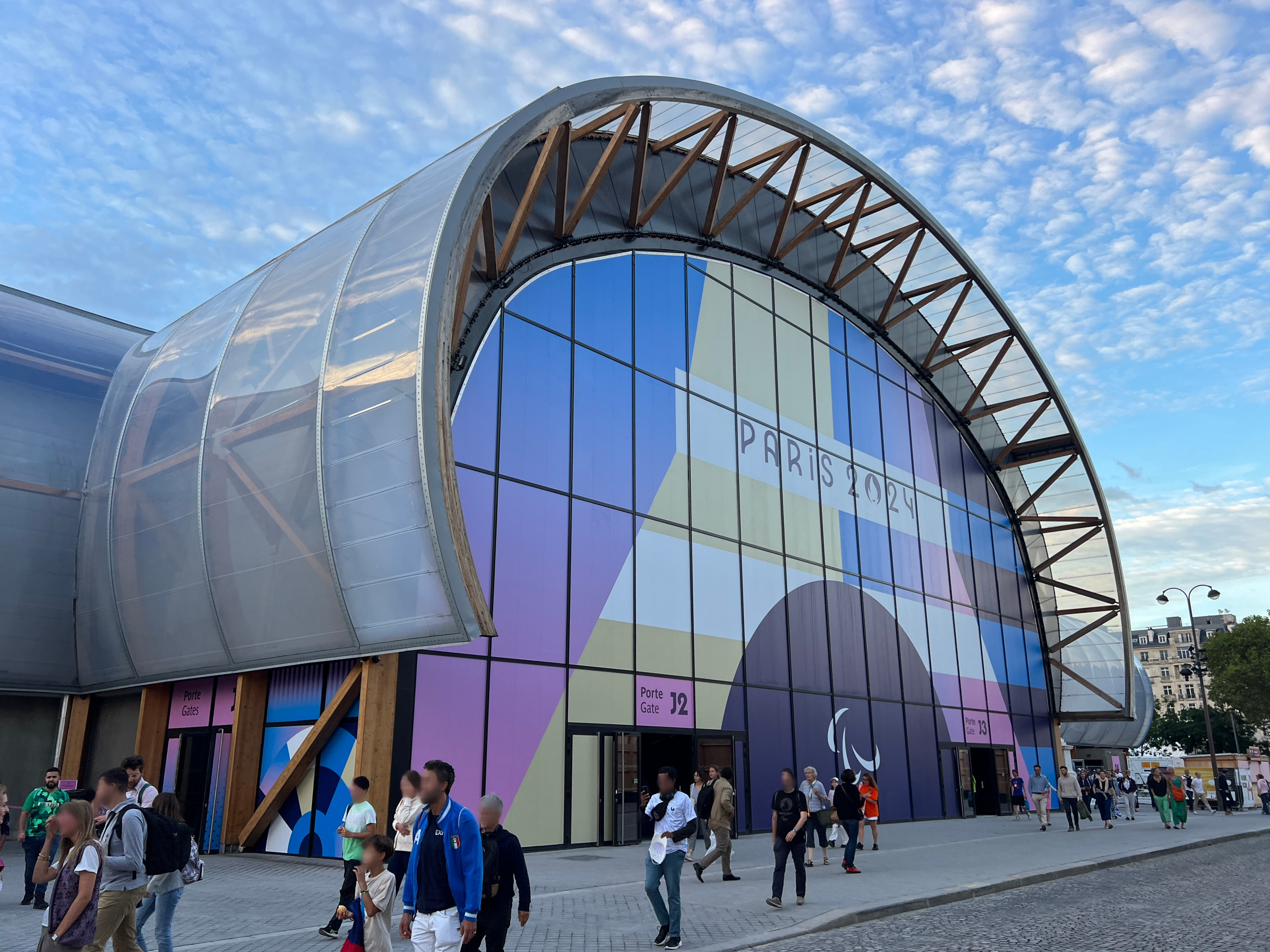
The Grand Palais Éphémère, where Tiebwa competed in her event

=== Qualification and lead-up to the games ===
Kiribati sent one female judoka to the games based on the International Judo Federation Olympics Individual Ranking. The nation selected judoka Nera Tiebwa, who scored only 10 points in the qualification period yet qualified as the second-highest ranked eligible Oceanian athlete. The lead-up to the games saw Tiebwa compete at the 2024 Judo Grand Slam Dushanbe in Dushanbe, Tajikistan, where she earned the 10 points.

=== Event ===
Making her debut at an Olympic Games at fifteen years old, Tiebwa was the youngest judoka that competed at the games. She competed in her event on 29 July, which was held in the Grand Palais Éphémère in Champ de Mars. In her first match, she faced 2018 world champion Daria Bilodid of Ukraine in the Round of 32. Tiebwa was defeated in six seconds by ippon with Ōuchi gari, and did not advance. The eventual winner of the event was Christa Deguchi of Canada. After Tiebwa competed in her event, she thanked her family, coach, and supporters.

Judo summary
Athlete	Event	Round of 32	Round of 16	Quarterfinals	Semifinals	Repechage	Final / BM	
Athlete	Event	Opposition Result	Opposition Result	Opposition Result	Opposition Result	Opposition Result	Opposition Result	Rank
Nera Tiebwa	Women's –57 kg	Bilodid (UKR); L 00–10	Did not advance					

== Weightlifting ==
=== Qualification and lead-up to the games ===
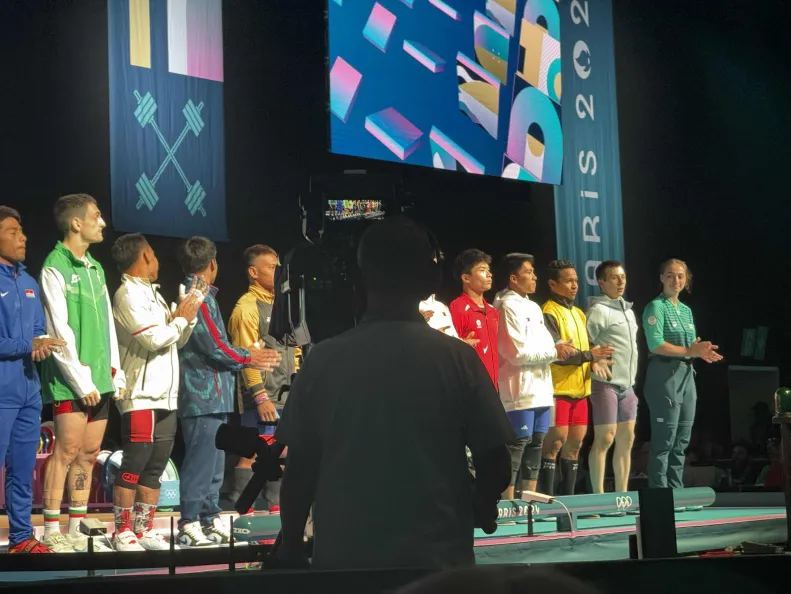
Erati (far-left) during the presentation of athletes of his event

Kiribati was eligible for a universality slot to send a weightlifter to the games. The nation selected Kaimauri Erati, who would compete in the men's 61 kg category. The lead-up to the games saw him compete at the 2023 Pacific Games, which doubled as the 2023 Oceania Weightlifting Championships, where he won three bronzes in both competitions. He also made his World Weightlifting Championships debut after competing at the 2023 World Weightlifting Championships in Riyadh, Saudi Arabia, placing 18th. He trained at a training camp in Divonne-les-Bains provided by Olympic Solidarity, with Erati praising the organization, the camp's facilities, and the help he received for his result at the games.

=== Event ===
Making his Olympic debut, Erati competed in his event on 7 August 2024 at 3:00 p.m., which was held in the Paris Expo Porte de Versailles. He was accompanied by his coach, Bwamatang Ioane. He lifted 95 kilograms for his first attempt in the snatch then attempted 100 kilograms for his second but failed, ultimately lifting the same declared weight on his third attempt. He then failed his opening clean and jerked of 120 kilograms then succeeded at the same weight for his second, though failed at his last attempt at 124 kilograms, finishing with a total of 220 kilograms. He finished seventh, the highest position for an I-Kiribati athlete at any edition of the games. The winner of the event was Li Fabin of China, who won with a total of 310 kilograms. After Erati competed in his event, he commented his desires for younger athletes in Kiribati to compete in the sport.

Weightlifting summary
Athlete	Event	Snatch		Clean & Jerk		Total	Rank
Athlete	Event	Result	Rank	Result	Rank	Total	Rank
Kaimauri Erati	Men's 61 kg	100	8	120	7	220	7

== See also ==
- Kiribati at the 2024 Summer Paralympics
