= Kiribati at the 2018 Commonwealth Games =

- Flag of Kiribati
- CG code: KIR
- CGA: Kiribati National Olympic Committee
- Website: oceaniasport.com/kiribati

in Gold Coast, Australia 4 April 2018 – 15 April 2018
- Competitors: 14 in 5 sports
- Flag bearer: David Katoatau (opening)
- Medals Ranked 0th: Gold 0 Silver 0 Bronze 0 Total 0

Commonwealth Games appearances (overview)
- 1998; 2002; 2006; 2010; 2014; 2018; 2022; 2026; 2030

Kiribati competed at the 2018 Commonwealth Games in the Gold Coast, Australia from April 4 to April 15, 2018.

Weightlifter David Katoatau was the island's flag bearer during the opening ceremony.

Despite not winning a medal this year, 2014 gold medalist David Katoatau nearly missed out of the podium, finishing 5th in the men's weightlifting 105 kg competition.

== Competitors ==
The following is the list of number of competitors participating at the Games per sport/discipline.

Sport	Men	Women	Total
Athletics	1	1	2
Boxing	2	0	2
Table tennis	3	0	3
Weightlifting	4	1	5
Wrestling	2	0	2
Total	12	2	14

== Athletics ==
Kiribati participated with 2 athletes (1 man and 1 woman).

Track & road events

Athlete	Event	Heat		Semifinal		Final	
Athlete	Event	Result	Rank	Result	Rank	Result	Rank
Tirioro Willie	Men's 100 m	11.45	7	did not advance			
Waymar Bwereeti	Women's 100 m	13.81	6	did not advance			

== Boxing ==
Kiribati participated with a team of 2 athletes (2 men).

Men

Athlete	Event	Round of 32	Round of 16	Quarterfinals	Semifinals	Final	Rank
Athlete	Event	Opposition Result	Opposition Result	Opposition Result	Opposition Result	Opposition Result	Rank
Betero Aaree	−56 kg	—N/a	Basran (CAN); L 0 - 5	did not advance			
Tevii Steven	−60 kg	Ngoma (ZAM); L 0 – 5	did not advance				

== Table tennis ==
Kiribati participated with 3 athletes (3 men).

Singles

Athletes	Event	Group Stage			Round of 64	Round of 32	Round of 16	Quarterfinal	Semifinal	Final	Rank
Athletes	Event	Opposition Score	Opposition Score	Rank	Opposition Score	Opposition Score	Opposition Score	Opposition Score	Opposition Score	Opposition Score	Rank
Allie Johnny	Men's singles	Gboyah (SLE); W 4 - 1	Abrefa (GHA); L 0 - 4	2	did not advance						
Tauramoa Miita	Men's singles	Medjugorac (CAN); L 0 - 4	Su (BIZ); W 4 - 3	2	did not advance						
Nooa Takooa	Men's singles	Benjamin (SLE); W 4 - 2	Abiodun (NGR); L 0 - 4	2	did not advance						

Doubles

Athletes	Event	Round of 64	Round of 32	Round of 16	Quarterfinal	Semifinal	Final	Rank
Athletes	Event	Opposition Score	Opposition Score	Opposition Score	Opposition Score	Opposition Score	Opposition Score	Rank
Tauramoa Miita; Nooa Takooa	Men's doubles	Bye	S Kamal (IND); S Gnanasekaran (IND); L 0 - 3	did not advance				

Team

Athletes	Event	Group Stage			Round of 16	Quarterfinal	Semifinal	Final	Rank
Athletes	Event	Opposition Score	Opposition Score	Rank	Opposition Score	Opposition Score	Opposition Score	Opposition Score	Rank
Allie Johnny; Tauramoa Miita; Nooa Takooa	Men's team	Australia; L 0–3	Scotland; L 0–3	3	did not advance				

== Weightlifting ==
Kiribati participated with 5 athletes (4 men and 1 woman).

Athlete	Event	Snatch		Clean & Jerk		Total	Rank
Athlete	Event	Result	Rank	Result	Rank	Total	Rank
Takirua Betero	Men's −62 kg	90	15	120	14	210	14
Ruben Katoatau	Men's −69 kg	120	7	160	3	280	6
Taretiita Tabaroua	Men's −77 kg	130	6	did not finish			
David Katoatau	Men's −105 kg	140	8	200	2	340	5
Tiiao Bakaekiri	Women's −69 kg	73	11	95	11	168	11

== Wrestling ==
Kiribati participated with 2 athletes (2 men).

Women

Athlete	Event	Round of 16	Quarterfinal	Semifinal	Repechage	Final / BM	
Athlete	Event	Opposition Result	Opposition Result	Opposition Result	Opposition Result	Opposition Result	Rank
Ioabo Teetu	-74 kg	Ali Amzad (BAN); L 0 - 4	did not advance				14
Taebontangaroa Kookoo	-86 kg	Kadian (IND); L 0 - 5	did not advance				13

== See also ==
- Kiribati at the 2018 Summer Youth Olympics
