= Kiribati at the 2022 Commonwealth Games =

- Flag of Kiribati
- CGF code: KIR
- CGA: Kiribati National Olympic Committee
- Website: facebook.com/kiribatinoc (Facebook)

in Birmingham, England 28 July 2022 – 8 August 2022
- Competitors: 6 (6 men) in 3 sports
- Medals: Gold 0 Silver 0 Bronze 0 Total 0

Commonwealth Games appearances (overview)
- 1998; 2002; 2006; 2010; 2014; 2018; 2022; 2026; 2030

Kiribati competed at the 2022 Commonwealth Games at Birmingham, England from 28 July to 8 August 2022. It was the team's seventh appearance at the Games.

Kiribati's team consisted of six male athletes competing in three sports.

== Competitors ==
The following is the list of number of competitors participating at the Games per sport/discipline.

Sport	Men	Women	Total
Athletics	1	0	1
Boxing	4	0	4
Weightlifting	1	0	1
Total	6	0	6

== Athletics ==
As of 2 June 2022, one athlete will take part in the competition.

Men
Track and road events

Athlete	Event	Heat		Semifinal		Final	
Athlete	Event	Result	Rank	Result	Rank	Result	Rank
Lataisi Mwea	100 m	11.33	8	did not advance			

== Boxing ==
A squad of four boxers was selected as of 27 June 2022.

Men

Athlete	Event	Round of 32	Round of 16	Quarterfinals	Semifinals	Final	
Athlete	Event	Opposition Result	Opposition Result	Opposition Result	Opposition Result	Opposition Result	Rank
Eriu Temakau	Flyweight	—	Mulligan (SCO); L 0 - 5	did not advance			
Betero Aaree	Featherweight	Commey (GHA); L 0 - 5	did not advance				
Timon Aaree	Light welterweight	Lynch (SCO); L RSC	did not advance				
Toaua Bangke	Welterweight	Vadamootoo (MRI); L 2 - 3	did not advance				

== Weightlifting ==
One weightlifter qualified through his position in the IWF Commonwealth Ranking List (as of 9 March 2022).

Athlete	Event	Weight lifted		Total	Rank
Athlete	Event	Snatch	Clean & jerk	Total	Rank
Ruben Katoatau	Men's 67 kg	114	144	258	6
