= Kiribati at the 2016 Summer Olympics =

- IOC code: KIR
- NOC: Kiribati National Olympic Committee
- Website: www.oceaniasport.com/kiribati

in Rio de Janeiro
- Competitors: 3 in 2 sports
- Flag bearer: David Katoatau
- Medals: Gold 0 Silver 0 Bronze 0 Total 0

Summer Olympics appearances (overview)
- 2004; 2008; 2012; 2016; 2020; 2024; 2028

Kiribati competed at the 2016 Summer Olympics in Rio de Janeiro, Brazil, from August 5 to 21, 2016. This was the nation's fourth consecutive appearance at the Summer Olympics.

The Kiribati team consisted of three athletes: track sprinters John Ruuka and Karitaake Tewaaki, and weightlifter David Katoatau, who reprised his role of leading the delegation for the third straight time as the nation's flag bearer in the opening ceremony. Kiribati has yet to win its first Olympic medal.

== Background ==
Kiribati had interest in Olympic participation in the 1980s, and the country later formed their National Olympic Committee (NOC) in 2002, which was recognized by the International Olympic Committee (IOC) in 2003. Kiribati's first Games was in 2004. The 2016 Olympics were Kiribati's fourth Games. In past Games, I-Kiribati have participated in weightlifting and athletics.

As of these Olympics, Kiribati has not won an Olympic medal. David Katoatau reprised his role as Kiribati's opening ceremonies flag bearer for the third consecutive Olympics. He received media attention due to the effort he put into the task. Kiribati did not have a closing ceremony flag bearer, and a volunteer performed the task.

== Athletics ==
Kiribati received universality slots from IAAF to send two athletes (one male and one female) to the Olympics. Since they qualified via universality slots, both athletes competed in the preliminary heats. Both athletes said they did not get enough practice time using blocks. They also did not get to practice much, since the main stadium in the capital city—Bairiki Stadium—is made of sand and often flooded.

Eighteen year old Karitaake Tewaaki competed in the 100 meter dash. This was her first Olympic Games. She finished eighth out of eight competitors in her heat, with a time of 14.70. She was eliminated from competition and did not advance to the next round.

John Ruuka turned 21 during the Olympics, which were his first. He ran the 100 meter dash in 11.65 seconds, 0.26 seconds away from the personal best he set the month prior. He finished sixth of seven in his heat, beating Hermenegildo Leite of Angola.

Key
- Note–Ranks given for track events are within the athlete's heat only

Track & road events

Athlete	Event	Heat		Quarterfinal		Semifinal		Final	
Athlete	Event	Time	Rank	Time	Rank	Time	Rank	Time	Rank
John Ruuka	Men's 100 m	11.65	6	did not advance					
Karitaake Tewaaki	Women's 100 m	14.70	8	did not advance					

== Weightlifting ==
Kiribati qualified one male weightlifter for the Rio Olympics by virtue of a top five national finish at the 2016 Oceania Championships. The 2016 Games were Katoatau's third consecutive Olympics. He lived and trained for the Olympics at the Oceania Weightlifting Institute in Nouméa, New Caledonia.

Katoatau, winner at the 2014 Commonwealth Games, lifted 145 kg in the snatch and 204 kg in the clean and jerk, for a total of 349 kg. He placed 14th overall out of the 14 lifters that completed the event (three others did not finish).

Katoatau made headlines when he danced after his lifts. He said he used dancing to draw attention to climate change. Kiribati is an island nation, at-risk to rising sea levels. A couple of years before the Olympics he had written an open letter, with the help of his coach, to ask for help. In the letter, Katoatau said, "I beg the countries of the world to see what is happening to Kiribati. The simple truth is that we do not have the resources to save ourselves. We will be the first to go."

Athlete	Event	Snatch		Clean & Jerk		Total	Rank
Athlete	Event	Result	Rank	Result	Rank	Total	Rank
David Katoatau	Men's −105 kg	145	17	204	12	349	14
