= Kiribati at the 2023 World Athletics Championships =

- Flag of Kiribati
- WA code: KIR

in Budapest, Hungary 19 August 2023 – 27 August 2023
- Competitors: 1 (1 man and 0 women)
- Medals: Gold 0 Silver 0 Bronze 0 Total 0

World Athletics Championships appearances
- 1999; 2001; 2003; 2005; 2007; 2009; 2011; 2013; 2015; 2017; 2019; 2022; 2023; 2025

Kiribati competed at the 2023 World Athletics Championships in Budapest, Hungary, which were held from 19 to 27 August 2023. The athlete delegation of the country was composed of one competitor, sprinter Tauro Tiaon who competed in the men's 100 metres. He qualified for the Championships upon being selected by the Kiribati Athletics Association. In his preliminary round, he set a new personal best with a time of 12.00 seconds and placed last.

== Background ==
The 2023 World Athletics Championships in Budapest, Hungary, were held from 19 to 27 August 2023. The Championships were held at the National Athletics Centre. To qualify for the World Championships, athletes had to reach an entry standard (e.g. time or distance), place in a specific position at select competitions, be a wild card entry, or qualify through their World Athletics Ranking at the end of the qualification period.

As Kiribati did not meet any of the four standards, they could send either one male or one female athlete in one event of the Championships who has not yet qualified. The Kiribati Athletics Association selected sprinter Tauro Tiaon, who would compete in the men's 100 metres. At the time of his selection, he was unranked within the World Athletics Rankings. Previously, he represented Kiribati at the 2022 Pacific Mini Games held in Saipan. There, he competed in the men's 100 metres and ran in a time of 12.21 seconds.

== Results ==
Key

- Q = Qualified for the next round
- q = Qualified for the next round as a fastest loser or, in field events, by position without achieving the qualifying target
- NR = National record
- PB = Personal best
- SB = Season best
- N/A = Round not applicable for the event

=== Men ===
Tiaon competed in the first preliminary round of the men's 100 metres on 19 August against six other sprinters. There, he recorded a personal best of 12.00 seconds and placed last, failing to advance further as only the top two of each heat and the two next fastest would only be able to do so.

Track and road events

Athlete	Event	Preliminary		Heat		Semifinal		Final	
Athlete	Event	Result	Rank	Result	Rank	Result	Rank	Result	Rank
Tauro Tiaon	100 metres	12.00 PB	7	Did not advance					
