= Kiribati at the 2012 Summer Olympics =

- IOC code: KIR
- NOC: Kiribati National Olympic Committee
- Website: www.oceaniasport.com/kiribati

in London
- Competitors: 3 in 2 sports
- Flag bearer: David Katoatau
- Medals: Gold 0 Silver 0 Bronze 0 Total 0

Summer Olympics appearances (overview)
- 2004; 2008; 2012; 2016; 2020; 2024; 2028

The Oceanic island nation of Kiribati competed at the 2012 Summer Olympics in London, held from July 27 – August 12, 2012. This was the nation's third appearance at the Olympics.

Three athletes from Kiribati were selected to compete in the Olympics: two in athletics and one in weightlifting. Kiribati also planned to send two athletes to compete in boxing, but the nation failed to qualify. Weightlifter David Katoatau, the oldest member of the delegation, reprised his role as national flag bearer at the opening ceremony. Kiribati has yet to win its first Olympic medal.

== Background ==
Kiribati had interest in Olympic participation in the 1980s, and the country later formed their National Olympic Committee (NOC) in 2002, which was recognized by the International Olympic Committee (IOC) in 2003. Kiribati's first Games was in 2004. The 2012 Olympics were Kiribati's third Games. In past Games, I-Kiribatis have participated in weightlifting and athletics.

David Katoatau was selected as Kiribati's opening ceremonies flag bearer for the second consecutive Olympics. He was also the flag bearer for the closing ceremonies. As of these Olympics, Kiribati has not won an Olympic medal.

== Athletics ==
Nooa Takooa competed at age 19 in the men's 100 meter dash, his first Olympic appearance. Takooa finished with a time of 11.53 seconds, seventh in his heat and 25th out of 29 overall. Takooa's time was a personal best, but he did not advance to the next round.

The 2012 Olympics were 17-year old Kaingaue David's first Games. She competed in the women's 100 meter event, finishing the preliminary heat with a personal best time of 13.61 seconds. David finished last in her heat and 29th out of 33 in the preliminary round.

=== Key ===
- Note–Ranks given for track events are within the athlete's heat only

=== Men ===
Athlete	Event	Heat		Quarterfinal		Semifinal		Final	
Athlete	Event	Result	Rank	Result	Rank	Result	Rank	Result	Rank
Nooa Takooa	100 m	11.53	7	did not advance					

=== Women ===
Athlete	Event	Heat		Quarterfinal		Semifinal		Final	
Athlete	Event	Result	Rank	Result	Rank	Result	Rank	Result	Rank
Kaingaue David	100 m	13.61	8	did not advance					

== Weightlifting ==
These Games were David Katoatau's second Olympics. He became the first I-Kiribati in the country's history to qualify for the Olympics on merit. Katoatau competed in the men's 94 kg weightlifting group. He placed 17th in the competition, with a snatch of 140, a clean and jerk of 185, combined for a total of 325.

Athlete	Event	Snatch		Clean & Jerk		Total	Rank
Athlete	Event	Result	Rank	Result	Rank	Total	Rank
David Katoatau	Men's −94 kg	140	17	185	16	325	17
