= Kiribati at the Commonwealth Games =

- CG code: KIR
- CGA: Kiribati National Olympic Committee
- Website: oceaniasport.com/kiribati
- Medals Ranked =48th: Gold 1 Silver 0 Bronze 0 Total 1

Commonwealth Games appearances (overview)
- 1998; 2002; 2006; 2010; 2014; 2018; 2022; 2026; 2030

Kiribati have competed in five Commonwealth Games, making their debut in 1998 and attending every subsequent Games to date. At the 2014 Commonwealth Games, David Katoatau won Kiribati's first medal, a gold, in men's weightlifting 105 kg.

== History ==
Kiribati first participated at the 1998 Commonwealth Games in Kuala Lumpur. Sixteen years later at the 2014 Commonwealth Games in Glasgow, the country achieved its first-ever gold medal when David Katoatau won the men's 105 kg in the final.

== Medal tally ==
	(gold)	(silver)	(bronze)	Total
Kiribati	1	0	0	1

Games	Gold	Silver	Bronze	Total
1998 Kuala Lumpur	0	0	0	0
2002 Manchester	0	0	0	0
2006 Melbourne	0	0	0	0
2010 Delhi	0	0	0	0
2014 Glasgow	1	0	0	1
2018 Gold Coast	0	0	0	0
2022 Birmingham	0	0	0	0
Totals (7 entries)	1	0	0	1

== See also ==
- All-time medal tally of Commonwealth Games
