= Bamab Napo =

Togolese sprinter (born 1984)

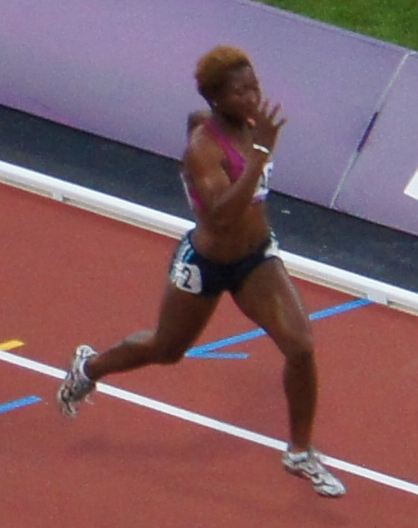
Bamab Napo at the 2012 Summer Olympics

Bamab Napo (born 23 May 1984 in Dimouri, Togo) is a Togolese runner. She competed at the 2012 Summer Olympics in the 100 m event and she was eliminated after the qualifying heats.
