= List of Kiribati records in athletics =

The following are the national records in athletics in Kiribati maintained by Kiribati's national athletics federation: Kiribati Athletics Association (KAA).

== Outdoor ==
Key to tables: Awaiting ratification Record not kept by KAA Not ratified or later rescinded by KAA

=== Men ===
Event	Record	Athlete	Date	Meet	Place	Ref.
100 m	10.86 (+1.8 m/s)	Kenaz Kaniwete	27 July 2026	Commonwealth Games	Glasgow, United Kingdom	
200 m	22.34 (−1.3 m/s)	Kenaz Kaniwete	23 May 2026	Oceania U20 Championships	Darwin, Australia	
400 m	51.98	Kiakia Tekambwa	8 August 2009	Oceania Sub-Regional Championships	Gold Coast, Australia	
800 m	2:01.73	Tanini Teekea	3 September 2007	Pacific Games	Apia, Samoa	
1000 m	3:07.32	Rabangaki Nawai	27 June 2008		Saipan, Northern Mariana Islands	
1000 m	2:44.1 h	Taburenga	13 July 2007		Bairiki, Kiribati	
1000 m	2:44.1 h	Tanini	13 July 2007		Bairiki, Kiribati	
1500 m	4:32.4 h	Kautu Rabangaki	2 September 1963	South Pacific Games	Suva, Fiji	
3000 m	10:10.0 h	Airam	1985			
5000 m	16:42.7 h	Teinakewe Tamuera	6 February 1998		Adelaide, Australia	
10,000 m	36:46.2 h	Tara Mango	31 August 1963	South Pacific Games	Suva, Fiji	
15 km (road)	52:28	Makaua Bwebwenibeia	14 July 2001		Bairiki, Kiribati	
Half marathon	1:24:32	Makaua Bwebwenibeia	7 October 2001		Tarawa, Kiribati	
Marathon						
110 m hurdles	16.80 (+0.6 m/s)	Beteru Ateri	6 September 2007	Pacific Games	Apia, Samoa	
400 m hurdles	59.21	Beteru Ateri	5 September 2007	Pacific Games	Apia, Samoa	
3000 m steeplechase	12:03.70	Peter Birati	11 July 1981	South Pacific Mini Games	Honiara, Solomon Islands	
High jump	2.00 m	Lataisi Mwea	6 October 2019	PB Series #3	Gold Coast, Australia	
Pole vault	2.10 m	Boitu Baiteke	4 September 2013	Pacific Mini Games	Mata Utu, Wallis and Futuna	
Long jump	6.86 m NWI	Karakoa Iotia	29 May 1976		Suva, Fiji	
Triple jump	13.90 m (+0.5 m/s)	Boitu Baiteke	22 June 2011	Oceania Regional Championships	Apia, Samoa	
Shot put	13.77 m	Raobu Tarawa	25 September 2009	Pacific Mini Games	Nikao, Cook Islands	
Discus throw	41.86 m	Raobu Tarawa	9 July 2009	Inter-School Championships	Bairiki, Kiribati	
Hammer throw	30.90 m	Tunia Kaotirake	21 May 2005		Bairiki, Kiribati	
Javelin throw	55.09 m	Rabangaki Nawai	12 December 2006	Oceania Championships	Apia, Samoa	
Decathlon	4069 pts	Boitu Baiteke	3–4 September 2013	Pacific Mini Games	Mata-Utu, Wallis and Futuna	
Decathlon	100m (wind) / Long jump (wind) / Shot put / High jump / 400m / 110m H (wind) / Discus / Pole vault / Javelin / 1500m; 12.12 (+1.6 m/s) / 5.98 m (−2.9 m/s) / 10.33 m / 1.67 m / 1:02.96 / 18.66 (+1.5 m/s) / 31.70 m / 2.10 m / 36.78 m / DNF					
20 km walk (road)						
50 km walk (road)						
4 × 100 m relay	44.11	Kiribati; Kimwaua Makin; Tirioro Willie; Mobera Tonana; Biira Burennaira	18 July 2018	Micronesian Games	Yap, Federated States of Micronesia	
4 × 200 m relay	1:38.5 h	Kiribati	19 May 2007		Bairiki, Kiribati	
4 × 400 m relay	3:31.42	Kiribati; Tearoba Takeruru; Taanini Teekia; Beteru Ateri; Baiteke Ibeatu	8 September 2007	Pacific Games	Apia, Samoa	
Sprint medley relay (1-1-2-4)	1:48.73	Katimiri; Iteraera; Kaiorake; Paul	3 July 1999		Guam	
Sprint medley relay (2-2-4-8)	4:07.8 h	Kennedy House Team	1995			

=== Women ===
Event	Record	Athlete	Date	Meet	Place	Ref.
60 m	9.1 h NWI	Kaitinano Mwemweata	18 July 2020	Independence Competition	Betio, Kiribati	
100 m	13.07 (−0.1 m/s)	Kaitinano Mwemweata	20 August 2004	Olympic Games	Athens, Greece	
100 m	13.0 h NWI	Taati	1983			
100 m	13.0 h NWI	Mary Schutz	9 July 2002		Bairiki, Kiribati	
100 m	13.0 h NWI	Kaitinano Mwemweata	5 August 2004		Cairns, Australia	
200 m	27.24 NWI	Kaitinano Mwemweata	5 September 2007	Pacific Games	Apia, Samoa	
200 m	27.2 h NWI	Kaingaue David	6 July 2012		Bairiki, Kiribati	
400 m	1:07.01	Kaingaue David	23 September 2010	Oceania Championships	Cairns, Australia	
400 m	1:06.9 h	Kaingaue David	5 July 2012		Bairiki, Kiribati	
800 m	2:38.3	Ruute Keakea	9 July 1999		Bairiki, Kiribati	
1000 m	3:56.07	Keerita Taebo	6 May 2006		Bairiki, Kiribati	
1500 m	5:30.0	Siaroka Kaiea	14 July 2001	Oceania Cup	Port Vila, Vanuatu	
3000 m	12:31.2	Banrenga Baikia	8 July 2004		Bairiki, Kiribati	
5000 m	21:09.36	Ruti Ioneba	22 September 2009	Pacific Mini Games	Nikao, Cook Islands	
10,000 m	54:59.74	Ruute Kaekea	1 August 1998	Micronesian Games	Koror, Palau	
Marathon						
100 m hurdles	18.14 (+0.7 m/s)	Kaitinano Mwemweata	5 September 2007	Pacific Games	Apia, Samoa	
400 m hurdles	1:14.85	Kimaia Dan Murdoch	26 June 2006	Micronesian Games	Susupe, Northern Marianas	
3000 m steeplechase						
High jump	1.50 m	Kimaia Dan Murdoch	11 May 2005		Bairiki, Kiribati	
Pole vault						
Long jump	4.86 m (+1.1 m/s)	Taati Eria	25 August 2000	Oceania Championships	Adelaide, Australia	
Triple jump	10.76 m	Terina Tangitang	4 July 2008		Bairiki, Kiribati	
Shot put	11.15 m	Kimeata Rakenang	21 June 2024	Micronesian Games	Majuro, Marshall Islands	
Discus throw	36.40 m	Taatia Riino	18 July 2020	Independence Competition	Betio, Kiribati	
Hammer throw	30.10 m	Taatia Riino	3 September 2011	Pacific Games	Nouméa, New Caledonia	
Javelin throw	31.75 m	Kaitinano Mwemweata	6 September 2007	Pacific Games	Apia, Samoa	
Heptathlon	3456 pts	Kaitinano Mwemweata	5–6 September 2007	Pacific Games	Apia, Samoa	
Heptathlon	100m H (wind) / High jump / Shot put / 200m (wind) / Long jump (wind) / Javelin / 800m; 18.14 (+0.7 m/s) / 1.35 m / 8.37 m / 27.24 / 4.42 m / 31.75 m / 2:51.30					
20 km walk (road)						
4 × 100 m relay	55.2	Kiribati; Lilly David; Rebeta Mackenzie; Matarena Tewaki; Kaitinano Mwemweata	16 June 2007		Bairiki, Kiribati	
4 × 200 m relay	2:06.4	Kiribati; Matarena; Kimaia; Mareta; Lilly	5 August 2006		Bairiki, Kiribati	
4 × 400 m relay	4:48.3 h	Kiribati; M. Taburimai; B. Martin; A. Kaireiti; T. Temaka	10 July 2009		Bairiki, Kiribati	
Sprint medley relay (1-1-2-4)	2:16.8 h	SlHS "Seniors" Team; Mary Schutz; Keitinano Mwemweata; Areau; Siaroka Kaiea	6 July 2001		Bairiki, Kiribati	

== Indoor ==
=== Men ===
Event	Record	Athlete	Date	Meet	Place	Ref.
60 m	7.25	Tirioro Willie	19 September 2017	Asian Indoor and Martial Arts Games	Ashgabat, Turkmenistan	
60 m	7.2 h	Umwariki Tibaua	18 July 2020	Independence Competition	Betio, Kiribati	
200 m						
400 m						
800 m						
1500 m						
3000 m						
60 m hurdles						
High jump	1.95 m	Lataisi Mwea	20 September 2017	Asian Indoor and Martial Arts Games	Ashgabat, Turkmenistan	
Pole vault						
Long jump	5.70 m	Buraieta Yeeting	19 September 2017	Asian Indoor and Martial Arts Games	Ashgabat, Turkmenistan	
Triple jump						
Shot put						
Heptathlon						
Heptathlon	60m / Long jump / Shot put / High jump / 60m H / Pole vault / 1000m					
5000 m walk						
4 × 400 m relay						

=== Women ===
Event	Record	Athlete	Date	Meet	Place	Ref.
60 m	9.14	Etita Tio	10 March 2012	World Championships	Istanbul, Turkey	
200 m						
400 m						
800 m						
1500 m						
3000 m						
60 m hurdles						
High jump						
Pole vault						
Long jump						
Triple jump						
Shot put						
Pentathlon						
Pentathlon	60m H / High jump / Shot put / Long jump / 800m					
3000 m walk						
4 × 400 m relay						
