= Maýsa Rejepowa =

Turkmenistani sprinter

Maysa Rejepova (born January 4, 1993, in Ashgabat) is a Turkmen sprinter. She competed in the 100 metres competition at the 2012 Summer Olympics; she ran the preliminaries in a personal best of 12.80 seconds, which did not qualify her for Round 1.
