= Athletics at the 2012 Summer Olympics – Women's 100 metres =

Women's 100 metres at the Games of the XXX Olympiad
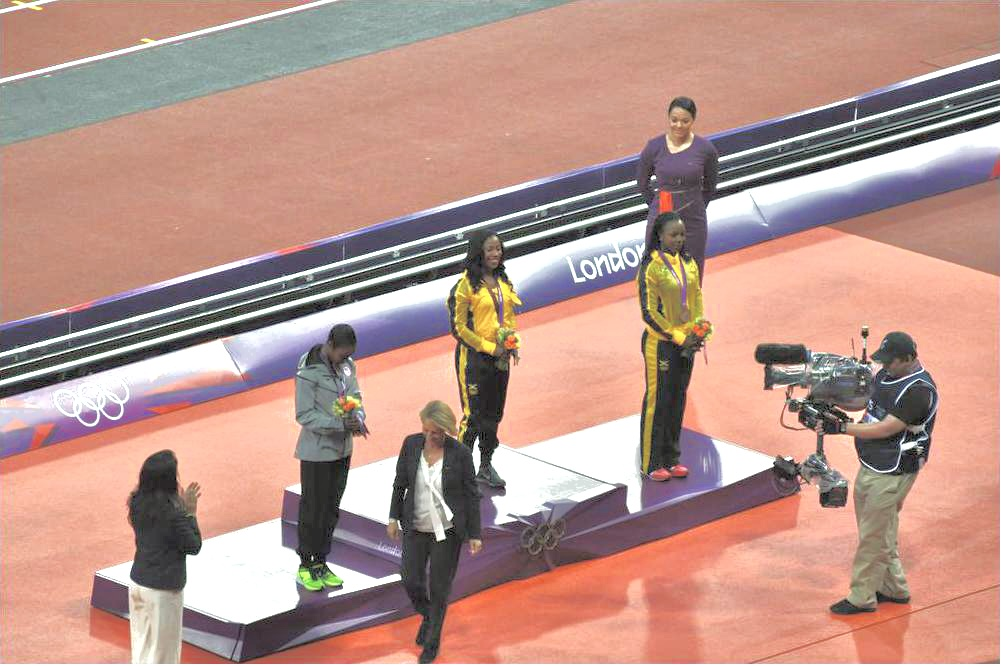
- Podium
- Venue: Olympic Stadium
- Date: 3–4 August
- Competitors: 79 from 67 nations
- Winning time: 10.75

Medalists
1st place, gold medalist(s)		Shelly-Ann Fraser-Pryce; Jamaica
2nd place, silver medalist(s)		Carmelita Jeter; United States
3rd place, bronze medalist(s)		Veronica Campbell Brown; Jamaica

Video on YouTube Official Video

The women's 100 metres competition at the 2012 Summer Olympics in London, United Kingdom was held at the Olympic Stadium on 3–4 August. The winning margin was 0.03 seconds.

In the preliminary round, Toea Wisil was the most impressive, winning with a relaxed 11.60 into a -1.6 mps wind, while Noor Hussain Al-Malki's Olympic experience lasted just the first steps out of the blocks before she pulled up. Qualifying into the next rounds, Wisil beat triple world champion Allyson Felix and the rest of her heat out of the blocks and came with in .05 of reaching the semi-final round, from the previously unqualified preliminary round. Carmelita Jeter ran hard for her second best time of the season to lead the round. Her training partner Blessing Okagbare left an impression by outrunning Tianna Madison for the second best time. Defending champion Shelly-Ann Fraser-Pryce exerted minimal effort to secure the fourth best qualifying time.

The semi-final round qualifiers was virtual mirror image of the previous evening's heats, the same top athletes with Jeter again posting a 10.83 and 11.01 the number 8 time. Ezinne Okparaebo's Norwegian national record 11.10 left her two places out of qualifying.

In the final, Shelly-Ann Fraser-Pryce led from the gun. She was quickest from the blocks with Jeter in close pursuit, and she ultimately leaned at the finish line for a narrow victory to defend her title. Veronica Campbell Brown added to her career medal haul with the bronze medal.

Jeter's time was the fastest non-winning time in Olympic history. In fact, all non-winning places 2-4 were the fastest for that place. This was the second race in history to place 5 runners under 10.90 (the other being the 1992 Olympic final). Only the third in history to place two under 10.80 (the others being the 1999 World Championships and the 2009 World Championships 100m final).

== Competition format ==
The women's 100 m competition started with a preliminary round consisting of athletes who did not achieve the minimum qualifying standards. The top ten competitors from the preliminary round then joined the remaining competitors in the next round, the heats. The top 3 fastest competitors from each race of the seven heats qualified for the semifinals along with the three fastest overall non-qualifiers. A total of eight competitors qualified for the final from the semifinals.

== Records ==
Prior to the competition, the existing World and Olympic records were as follows.

World record	Florence Griffith Joyner (USA)	10.49	Indianapolis, United States	16 July 1988
Olympic record	Florence Griffith Joyner (USA)	10.62	Seoul, South Korea	24 September 1988
2012 World leading	Shelly-Ann Fraser-Pryce (JAM)	10.70	Kingston, Jamaica	29 June 2012

== Schedule ==
All times are British Summer Time (UTC+1)

Date	Time	Round
Friday, 3 August 2012	10:40; 19:05	Preliminaries; Round 1
Saturday, 4 August 2012	19:35; 21:55	Semifinals; Finals

== Results ==
Official Video of Preliminary Round

=== Preliminaries ===
Qual. rule: first 2 of each heat (Q) plus the 2 fastest times (q) qualified.

==== Preliminary heat 1 ====
Rank	Athlete	Nation	Time	Notes
1	Feta Ahamada	Comoros	11.81	Q
2	Dana Abdul Razak	Iraq	11.91	Q
3	Bamab Napo	Togo	12.24	q, PB
4	Chauzje Choosha	Zambia	12.29	PB
5	Afa Ismail	Maldives	12.52	PB
6	Rima Taha	Jordan	12.66	PB
7	Aissata Toure	Guinea	13.25	
8	Kaingaue David	Kiribati	13.61	PB
			Wind: +0.9 m/s	

==== Preliminary heat 2 ====
Rank	Athlete	Nation	Time	Notes
1	Delphine Atangana	Cameroon	11.71	Q
2	Kaina Martinez	Belize	11.81	Q
3	Diane Borg	Malta	12.00	q
4	Shinoona Salah Al-Habsi	Oman	12.45	
5	Cristina Llovera	Andorra	12.78	
6	Nafissa Souleymane	Niger	12.81	
7	Asenate Manoa	Tuvalu	13.48	NR
8	Fatima Sulaiman Dahman	Yemen	13.95	
			Wind: −0.2 m/s	

==== Preliminary heat 3 ====
Rank	Athlete	Nation	Time	Notes
1	Lorène Bazolo	Republic of the Congo	11.87	Q
2	Fong Yee Pui	Hong Kong	12.02	Q
3	Patricia Taea	Cook Islands	12.47	SB
4	Maysa Rejepova	Turkmenistan	12.80	PB
5	Pauline Kwalea	Solomon Islands	12.90	PB
6	Laenly Phoutthavong	Laos	13.15	
7	Ruby Joy Gabriel	Palau	13.34	
–	Noor Hussain Al-Malki	Qatar	DNF	
			Wind: +0.2 m/s	

==== Preliminary heat 4 ====
Rank	Athlete	Nation	Time	Notes
1	Toea Wisil	Papua New Guinea	11.60	Q
2	Saruba Colley	The Gambia	12.21	Q
3	Martina Pretelli	San Marino	12.41	
4	Lidiane Lopes	Cape Verde	12.72	
5	Hala Gezah	Libya	13.24	
6	Pramila Rijal	Nepal	13.33	
7	Janice Alatoa	Vanuatu	13.60	
8	Mihter Wendolin	Federated States of Micronesia	13.67	
9	Tahmina Kohistani	Afghanistan	14.42	PB
			Wind: –1.6 m/s	

Official Video of the Quarterfinal Round

=== Heats ===
- 81 entrants as of 27 July 2012.

Qual. rule: first 3 of each heat (Q) plus the 3 fastest times (q) qualified.

==== Heat 1 ====
Rank	Athlete	Nation	Time	Notes
1	Kelly-Ann Baptiste	Trinidad and Tobago	10.96	Q
2	Myriam Soumaré	France	11.07	Q, PB
3	Verena Sailer	Germany	11.12	Q
4	Ezinne Okparaebo	Norway	11.14	q, NR
5	Kateřina Čechová	Czech Republic	11.43	
6	Kerri-Ann Mitchell	Canada	11.49	
7	Tahesia Harrigan-Scott	British Virgin Islands	11.59	SB
8	Fong Yee Pui	Hong Kong	11.98	
			Wind: +0.4 m/s	

==== Heat 2 ====
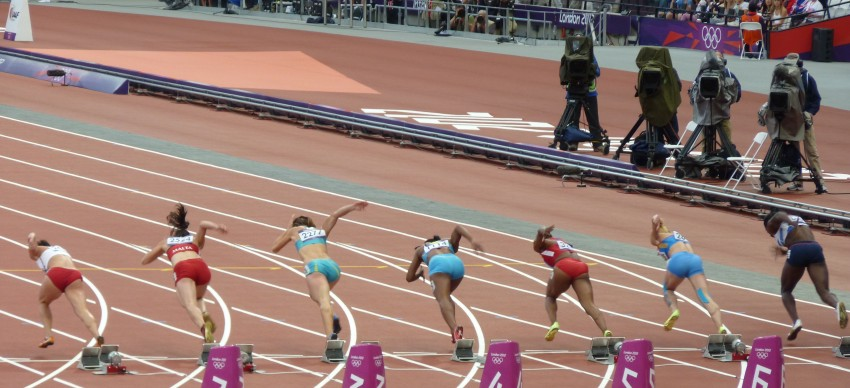
Women's 100 metres heat 2

Rank	Athlete	Nation	Time	Notes
1	Carmelita Jeter	United States	10.83	Q
2	Olga Bludova	Kazakhstan	11.31	Q
3	Sheniqua Ferguson	Bahamas	11.35	Q
4	Olga Belkina	Russia	11.38	
5	Anyika Onuora	Great Britain	11.41	
6	Marta Jeschke	Poland	11.42	
7	Yuliya Balykina	Belarus	11.70	
8	Diane Borg	Malta	11.92	SB
			Wind: +1.5 m/s	

==== Heat 3 ====
Wind:
Heat 3: +1.5 m/s

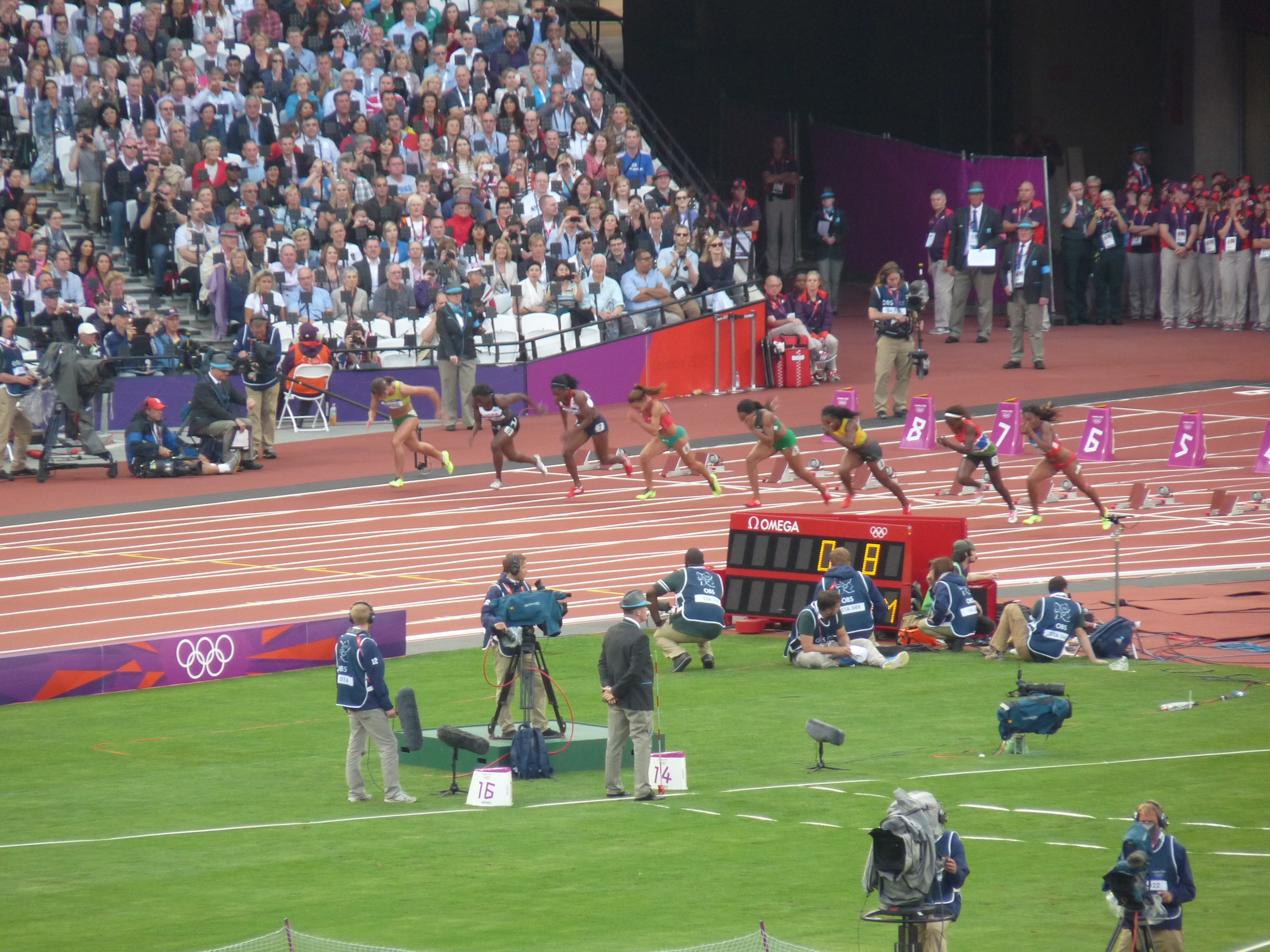
Women's 100 metres heat 3

Rank	Athlete	Nation	Time	Notes
1	Veronica Campbell Brown	Jamaica	10.94	Q
2	Ivet Lalova	Bulgaria	11.06	Q,
3	Gloria Asumnu	Nigeria	11.13	Q,
4	Lina Grinčikaitė	Lithuania	11.19	q, NR
5	Abiodun Oyepitan	Great Britain	11.22	q
6	Phobay Kutu-Akoi	Liberia	11.52	
7	Yomara Hinestroza	Colombia	11.56	SB
8	Saruba Colley	The Gambia	12.06	NR
			Wind: +1.5 m/s	

==== Heat 4 ====
Rank	Athlete	Nation	Time	Notes
1	Blessing Okagbare	Nigeria	10.93	Q, PB
2	Tianna Madison	United States	10.97	Q
3	Michelle-Lee Ahye	Trinidad and Tobago	11.28	Q
4	Tatjana Pinto	Germany	11.39	
5	Andreea Ogrăzeanu	Romania	11.44	
6	Nimet Karakus	Turkey	11.62	
7	Feta Ahamada	Comoros	11.86	
8	Lorène Bazolo	Republic of the Congo	11.90	
			Wind: +0.7 m/s	

==== Heat 5 ====
Rank	Athlete	Nation	Time	Notes
1	Allyson Felix	United States	11.01	Q
2	Rosângela Santos	Brazil	11.07	Q
3	Ruddy Zang Milama	Gabon	11.14	Q
4	Toea Wisil	Papua New Guinea	11.27	
5	Allison Peter	Virgin Islands	11.41	
5	Véronique Mang	France	11.41	
5	Chisato Fukushima	Japan	11.41	
8	Dana Abdul Razak	Iraq	11.81	
			Wind: +2.2 m/s	

==== Heat 6 ====
Rank	Athlete	Nation	Time	Notes
1	Shelly-Ann Fraser-Pryce	Jamaica	11.00	Q
2	Semoy Hackett	Trinidad and Tobago	11.04	Q, PB
3	Olesya Povh	Ukraine	11.18	Q
4	Guzel Khubbieva	Uzbekistan	11.22	SB
5	Debbie Ferguson-McKenzie	Bahamas	11.32	
6	Melissa Breen	Australia	11.34	
7	Wei Yongli	China	11.48	
8	Bamab Napo	Togo	12.35	
			Wind: +1.5 m/s	

==== Heat 7 ====
Rank	Athlete	Nation	Time	Notes
1	Murielle Ahouré	Ivory Coast	10.99	Q, NR
2	Laverne Jones-Ferrette	Virgin Islands	11.07	Q, NR
3	Kerron Stewart	Jamaica	11.08	Q
4	Oludamola Osayomi	Nigeria	11.36	
5	Nataliya Pohrebnyak	Ukraine	11.46	
6	Maria Belibasaki	Greece	11.63	
7	Delphine Atangana	Cameroon	11.82	
8	Kaina Martinez	Belize	11.89	
			Wind: +1.3 m/s	

Official Video of the Semi-Final Round

=== Semifinals ===
Qual. rule: first 2 of each heat (Q) plus the 2 fastest times (q) qualified.

==== Semifinal 1 ====
Rank	Athlete	Nation	Time	Notes
1	Carmelita Jeter	United States	10.83	Q
2	Veronica Campbell Brown	Jamaica	10.89	Q
3	Rosângela Santos	Brazil	11.17	PB
4	LaVerne Jones-Ferrette	Virgin Islands	11.22	
5	Olesya Povh	Ukraine	11.30	
6	Ruddy Zang Milama	Gabon	11.31	
7	Abiodun Oyepitan	Great Britain	11.36	
–	Semoy Hackett	Trinidad and Tobago	~~11.26~~	DQ
			Wind: ±0.0 m/s	

==== Semifinal 2 ====
Rank	Athlete	Nation	Time	Notes
1	Shelly-Ann Fraser-Pryce	Jamaica	10.85	Q
2	Allyson Felix	United States	10.94	Q
3	Kelly-Ann Baptiste	Trinidad and Tobago	11.00	q
4	Ezinne Okparaebo	Norway	11.10	NR
5	Gloria Asumnu	Nigeria	11.21	
6	Ivet Lalova	Bulgaria	11.31	
7	Sheniqua Ferguson	Bahamas	11.32	
8	Olga Bludova	Kazakhstan	11.39	
			Wind: +1.2 m/s	

==== Semifinal 3 ====
Rank	Athlete	Nation	Time	Notes
1	Blessing Okagbare	Nigeria	10.92	Q, PB
2	Tianna Madison	United States	10.92	Q
3	Murielle Ahouré	Ivory Coast	11.01	q
4	Kerron Stewart	Jamaica	11.04	
5	Myriam Soumaré	France	11.13	
6	Verena Sailer	Germany	11.25	
7	Lina Grincikaité	Lithuania	11.30	
8	Michelle-Lee Ahye	Trinidad and Tobago	11.32	
			Wind: +1.0 m/s	

=== Final ===
Rank	Lane	Athlete	Nation	Time	Notes
1st place, gold medalist(s)	7	Shelly-Ann Fraser-Pryce	Jamaica	10.75	
2nd place, silver medalist(s)	5	Carmelita Jeter	United States	10.78	SB
3rd place, bronze medalist(s)	4	Veronica Campbell Brown	Jamaica	10.81	SB
4	9	Tianna Madison	United States	10.85	PB
5	8	Allyson Felix	United States	10.89	PB
6	2	Kelly-Ann Baptiste	Trinidad and Tobago	10.94	
7	3	Murielle Ahouré	Ivory Coast	11.00	
8	6	Blessing Okagbare	Nigeria	11.01	
				Wind: +1.5 m/s	
