= Wrestling at the 2018 Commonwealth Games – Men's freestyle 86 kg =

Wrestling – Men's freestyle 86 kg at the 2018 Commonwealth Games
- Venue: Carrara Sports and Leisure Centre
- Dates: 14 April 2018
- Competitors: 13 from 13 nations

Medalists
gold medal	Muhammad Inam	Pakistan
silver medal	Melvin Bibo	Nigeria
bronze medal	Syerus Eslami	England
bronze medal	Somveer Kadian	India

The men's 86 kg freestyle wrestling competition at the 2018 Commonwealth Games in Gold Coast, Australia was held on 14 April at the Carrara Sports and Leisure Centre.

This freestyle wrestling competition consists of a single-elimination tournament, with a repechage used to determine the winner of two bronze medals. The two finalists face off for gold and silver medals. Each wrestler who loses to one of the two finalists moves into the repechage, culminating in a pair of bronze medal matches featuring the semifinal losers each facing the remaining repechage opponent from their half of the bracket.

== Results ==
Legend

- F — Won by fall

=== Main bracket ===
Round of 16
Syerus Eslami (ENG)	12
Mark Inguyesi (KEN)	2
Taebontangaroa Kookoo (KIR)	0
Somveer Kadian (IND)	4^{F}
Jayden Lawrence (AUS)	4
Muhammad Inam (PAK)	14
Alex Moore (CAN)	12
Michael Gaitskill (RSA)	2
Kevin Wallen (JAM)	11
Rashji Mackey (BAH)	10

Quarterfinals
David Conteh (SLE)	0
Melvin Bibo (NGR)	4^{F}
Toby Fitzpatrick (NZL)	8
Syerus Eslami (ENG)	9
Somveer Kadian (IND)	0
Muhammad Inam (PAK)	10
Alex Moore (CAN)	10
Kevin Wallen (JAM)	0

Semifinals
Melvin Bibo (NGR)	10
Syerus Eslami (ENG)	0
Muhammad Inam (PAK)	4^{F}
Alex Moore (CAN)	6

Final
Melvin Bibo (NGR)	0
Muhammad Inam (PAK)	6

=== Repechage ===
Repechage first round
Jayden Lawrence (AUS)	0
Somveer Kadian (IND)	7^{F}

Bronze medal match
David Conteh (SLE)	0
Syerus Eslami (ENG)	11
Somveer Kadian (IND)	7
Alex Moore (CAN)	3
