= Kiribati at the 2004 Summer Olympics =

- IOC code: KIR
- NOC: Kiribati National Olympic Committee
- Website: www.oceaniasport.com/kiribati

in Athens
- Competitors: 3 in 2 sports
- Flag bearer: Meamea Thomas
- Medals: Gold 0 Silver 0 Bronze 0 Total 0

Summer Olympics appearances (overview)
- 2004; 2008; 2012; 2016; 2020; 2024; 2028

Kiribati competed in the Summer Olympic Games for the first time at the 2004 Summer Olympics in Athens, from August 13–29, 2004. The country sent three representatives to the games: two in athletics and one in weightlifting. As of 2012, Meamea Thomas has the best finish of any I-Kiribati athlete in Olympic history. Kiribati did not win medals at these Games.

== Background ==
The 2004 Olympics were Kiribati's first games, along with East Timor. Kiribati had interest in Olympic participation in the 1980s, and the country later formed their National Olympic Committee (NOC) in 2002, which was recognized by the International Olympic Committee (IOC) in 2003.

Weightlifter Meamea Thomas was the flagbearer for the opening ceremonies. During the ceremony, the men wore grass skirts with braided hair belts. Kaitinano Mwemweata wore a skirt of coconut leaves with a woven grass top. For the closing ceremonies, Mwemweata was the flagbearer.

== Athletics ==
Both athletes did not know they were going to compete until a couple of weeks prior to the Olympics. A competitor broke their foot, and another's fear of flying prevented their trip to the Games, opening up two spots for I-Kiribati athletes. The I-Kiribati athletes had to travel to Australia early so they could learn how to use starting blocks.

Kakianako Nariki's competed in his first and only Olympics. Nariki was afraid of being disqualified because there were false starts in his heat. He ended up finishing seventh in his heat, with a time of 11.62, beating disqualified athlete Marc Burns.

Kaitinano Mwemweata competed in the women's 100 meter dash. She finished the race with a time of 13.07 seconds, a personal best she was excited about. She finished seventh in her heat, failing to advance to the next round.

=== Key ===
- Note–Ranks given for track events are within the athlete's heat only
- Q = Qualified for the next round
- q = Qualified for the next round as a fastest loser or, in field events, by position without achieving the qualifying target
- NR = National record
- N/A = Round not applicable for the event
- Bye = Athlete not required to compete in round

=== Men ===
Athlete	Event	Heat		Quarterfinal		Semifinal		Final	
Athlete	Event	Result	Rank	Result	Rank	Result	Rank	Result	Rank
Kakianako Nariki	100 m	11.62	7	Did not advance					

=== Women ===
Athlete	Event	Heat		Quarterfinal		Semifinal		Final	
Athlete	Event	Result	Rank	Result	Rank	Result	Rank	Result	Rank
Kaitinano Mwemweata	100 m	13.07	7	Did not advance					

== Weightlifting ==
Although Meamea Thomas won gold in the men's −85 kg in the Oceania Championships, he did not automatically qualify and later received a wildcard entry.

Thomas competed in the men's −85 kg weightlifting competition, finishing 17th in the snatch and 13th in the clean and jerk. Overall, he finished 13th out of 21 competitors. As of the 2012 Olympics, Meamea Thomas has the highest finish of any I-Kiribati athlete in Olympic history.

Athlete	Event	Snatch		Clean & Jerk		Total	Rank
Athlete	Event	Result	Rank	Result	Rank	Total	Rank
Meamea Thomas	Men's −85 kg	130	17	162.5	13	292.5	13
