= Kinaua Biribo =

I-Kiribati judoka

Personal information
- Born: 14 August 1993 (age 32) South Tarawa, Kiribati
- Occupation: Judoka

Sport
- Country: Kiribati
- Sport: Judo
- Event: –70 kg

Profile at external databases
- IJF: 61321
- JudoInside.com: 117275

Kinaua Biribo (born 14 August 1993 in South Tarawa) is an I-Kiribati judoka.

She represented her country in the middleweight tournament of the 2020 Summer Olympics, after participating at the 2021 World Championships (70 kg) in Budapest, and was the flagbearer at the Tokyo opening ceremony. She competed in the women's 70 kg event.

== Life ==
Kinaua started judo as well as traditional kiribati wrestling to find a way to self-defense after her experience of sexual assault and abduction at age 6.She initially took up wrestling but she was only one of three women taking part. Kinaua uses her platform to raise awareness of the widespread domestic violence in her country and climate change and volunteered with the Kiribati Climate Action Network (Kiri-CAN). She lost her first bout at the Olympics with the Australian Aoife Coughlan.

Olympic Games
Preceded by David Katoatau	Flagbearer for Kiribati; Tokyo 2020	Succeeded by Nera Tiebwa
