= John Ruuka =

I-Kiribati sprinter

John Ruuka (born 13 August 1995) is an I-Kiribati sprinter. He competed at the 2016 Summer Olympics in the men's 100 metres race; his time of 11.65 seconds in the preliminary round did not qualify him for the first round.
