= Kiribati at the 2008 Summer Olympics =

- IOC code: KIR
- NOC: Kiribati National Olympic Committee
- Website: www.oceaniasport.com/kiribati

in Beijing
- Competitors: 2 in 2 sports
- Flag bearer: David Katoatau
- Medals: Gold 0 Silver 0 Bronze 0 Total 0

Summer Olympics appearances (overview)
- 2004; 2008; 2012; 2016; 2020; 2024; 2028

Kiribati competed in the Summer Olympic Games for the second time at the 2008 Summer Olympics in Beijing, China, following their debut appearance in the 2004 Summer Olympics in Athens, Greece. The country had intended to send a total of three athletes to the Games, competing in two sports: athletics and weightlifting. Female sprinter Kaitinano Mwemweata had to withdraw due to illness after contracting tuberculosis.

== Background ==
Kiribati had interest in Olympic participation in the 1980s, and the country later formed their National Olympic Committee (NOC) in 2002, which was recognized by the International Olympic Committee (IOC) in 2003. Kiribati's first Games was in 2004. As of these Olympics, Kiribati had never won an Olympic medal.

Weightlifter David Katoatau was Kiribati's flag bearer for the opening ceremonies. The flag bearer for the closing ceremony was Kiribati NOC president Birimaka Tekanene.

== Athletics (track and field) ==
Kaitinano Mwemweata fell ill and did not participate in the Olympics, and was treated for tuberculosis instead. Her withdrawal left Kiribati with one representative in athletics. Rabangaki Nawai was entered in the 100 meter and 200 meter sprint events. Nawai ran a personal season's best time of 11.29 seconds in the first round of the 100 meter sprint. He had the fastest reaction time in the heat, but placed last, and failed to progress to the next round. He did not run in the 200 meter competition for undisclosed reasons.

=== Key ===
- Note: Ranks given for track events are within the athlete's heat only
- Q = Qualified for the next round
- q = Qualified for the next round as a fastest loser or, in field events, by position without achieving the qualifying target
- NR = National record
- N/A = Round not applicable for the event
- Bye = Athlete not required to compete in round

Athlete	Event	Heat		Quarter-final		Semi-final		Final	
Athlete	Event	Result	Rank	Result	Rank	Result	Rank	Result	Rank
Rabangaki Nawai	100 m	11.29	8	did not advance					

== Weightlifting ==
David Katoatau represented Kiribati in the men's 85 kg class of the weightlifting competition, qualifying by wildcard. He finished in 15th place, ahead of Terrence Dixie of Seychelles and five lifters who did not finish the event.

Athlete	Event	Snatch		Clean & Jerk		Total	Rank
Athlete	Event	Result	Rank	Result	Rank	Total	Rank
David Katoatau	Men's −85 kg	135	15	178	12	313	12
