= Somveer Kadian =

Indian freestyle wrestler

Personal information
- Nationality: Indian
- Born: 2 April 1992 (age 34) Rohtak, Haryana, India
- Height: 176 cm (5 ft 9 1/2 in)
- Weight: 86 kg (190 lb)

Sport
- Country: India
- Sport: Freestyle wrestling
Medal record
Men's freestyle wrestling
Representing India
Commonwealth Games
Bronze medal – third place	2018 Gold Coast	86 kg

Somveer Kadian (born 2 April 1992) is an Indian freestyle wrestler who won a bronze medal at the 2018 Commonwealth Games in the 86 kg category.

Somveer's brother Satyawart is also a freestyle wrestler and a silver medalist at the 2014 Commonwealth Games.
