= Kiribati at the 2015 World Championships in Athletics =

- WA code: KIR

in Beijing
- Competitors: 1
- Medals: Gold 0 Silver 0 Bronze 0 Total 0

World Championships in Athletics appearances
- 1999; 2001; 2003; 2005; 2007; 2009; 2011; 2013; 2015; 2017; 2019; 2022; 2023

Kiribati competed at the 2015 World Championships in Athletics in Beijing, China, from 22–30 August 2015.

== Results ==
(q – qualified, NM – no mark, SB – season best)

=== Men ===
Track and road events

Kiribati had one athlete qualify for the 2015 World Championships: Kimwaua Makin in the 100m sprint. He ran a season best 11.98 seconds in the preliminary round, but this was not a good enough time to advance further in the event.

Athlete	Event	Preliminary Round		Heat		Semifinal		Final	
Athlete	Event	Result	Rank	Result	Rank	Result	Rank	Result	Rank
Kimwaua Makin	100 metres	11.98 SB	25	did not advance					
