= Karitaake Tewaaki =

I-Kiribati sprinter

Karitaake Tewaaki (born December 1, 1997) is an I-Kiribati sprinter. She competed at the 2016 Summer Olympics in the women's 100 metres race; her time of 14.70 seconds in the preliminary round did not qualify her for the first round.
