= Kakianako Nariki =

Kiribati sprinter (born 1982)

Kakianako Nariki (born December 28, 1982) is an I-Kiribati athlete specializing in the 100 metres.

Participating in the 2004 Summer Olympics, he achieved seventh place in his 100 metres heat, thus failing to make it through to the second round.

== Early life ==
Kakianako Nariki was born December 28, 1982, in Marakei, Kiribati.

== Career ==
Nariki participated in the 2003 South Pacific Games.

=== Olympic career ===
Nariki participated in Kiribati's first Olympics, the 2004 Summer Olympics, with two other I-Kiribati athletes.
