= Meamea Thomas =

Kiribati weightlifter

Personal information
- Born: 11 September 1987
- Died: 23 June 2013 (aged 25)
- Height: 1.72 m (5 ft 7 1/2 in)
- Weight: 85 kg (187 lb)

Sport
- Country: Kiribati
- Sport: Weightlifting
Medal record
Weightlifting
South Pacific Games
Gold medal – first place	2003 Suva	85kg
Gold medal – first place	2003 Suva
Silver medal – second place	2011 Nouméa

Meamea Thomas (11 September 1987 in Tarawa – c. 23 June 2013) was an I-Kiribati weightlifter.

Thomas represented Kiribati in the men's 85 kg event at the 2004 Summer Olympics in Athens. He was, at that time, ranked 63rd in the world. He finished 13th, having lifted 292.5 kg. He was also his country's flagbearer during the Opening Ceremony. He had previously won gold in the same event at the 2003 South Pacific Games in Suva. He did not take part in the 2008 Olympics.

In all, he won two gold medals at the 2003 South Pacific Games, and three at the 2009 Pacific Mini Games. He won silver at the 2011 Pacific Games, and was twice Oceania Champion: in 2004 and 2010.

On or around 23 June 2013, he was killed in a crash in his home country, at the age of 25. He saw a bicycle rider about to be hit by a speeding car, and pushed the rider to safety. He was hit instead, and died instantly. The driver of the car was drunk. Paul Coffa, General Secretary of the Oceania Weightlifting Federation, paid tribute to his heroism in sacrificing himself to save a life.
