= Kaingaue David =

Kiribati sprinter (born 1995)

Personal information
- Born: March 20, 1995 (age 31) Tarawa, Kiribati
- Height: 1.67 m (5 ft 5 1/2 in)
- Weight: 67 kg (148 lb)

Sport
- Country: Kiribati
- Sport: Athletics
- Event: 100m

Kaingaue David (born March 20, 1995, in Tarawa) is an I-Kiribati sprinter. She competed in the 100 metres competition at the 2012 Summer Olympics; she ran the preliminaries in a personal best of 13.61 seconds, which did not qualify her for Round 1. Kaingaue is a member of the Church of Jesus Christ of Latter-day Saints.
