= Lataisi Mwea =

I-Kiribati athlete (born 2000)

Personal information
- Nationality: Kiribati
- Born: 26 July 2000 (age 25) South Tarawa, Kiribati
- Height: 1.91 m (6 ft 3 in)
- Weight: 89 kg (196 lb)

Sport
- Sport: Athletics

Achievements and titles
- Personal bests: 11.21 (100 m); 22.54 (200 m); 54.03 (400 m); 2.00 m (High Jump, NR)
Medal record
Men's Athletics
Representing Kiribati
- Updated on 30 July 2022

Lataisi Mwea (born 26 July 2000) is an I-Kiribati athlete who competes in sprinting events.

From 2019, Mwea has been based at the OAA High Performance Training Centre in Gold Coast when he was sent by his Kiribati Athletics Association for a high jump training scholarship. He broke the national record for high jump when he jumped 2.00 m clear in October 2019. After a change of coach to Andrew Lulham, Lataisi indicated also an interest in undertaking sprint training in addition to his jumps training and linked with Leanne Hines-Smith for track sessions. From March 2020, he was stranded in Australia since the closure of borders of his own country and has to stay one year more in Gold Coast.

In January 2021 Mwea set a new national record as he ran 22.61 for the 200 metres. Earlier in the day he ran a 100 metres race where he recorded 11.30 with a +2.5 headwind. On 12 June 2021, in Gold Coast, he ran in 11.03, the best ever run by an I-Kiribati but with the same too favorable wind. At the 2020 Summer Games 100m race Mwea ran his heat in 11.25 seconds.
