= Kiribati Athletics Association =

Governing body of athletics in Kiribati

- Sport: Athletics
- Abbreviation: KAA
- Founded: 1999
- Affiliation: IAAF
- Affiliation date: 1999
- Regional affiliation: OAA
- Affiliation date: Suspended since 2020
- Headquarters: South Tarawa, Tarawa
- President: Brian Fukuyama

Official website
- www.foxsportspulse.com/assoc_page.cgi?c=2-1153-0-0-0
- (Kiribati)

The Kiribati Athletics Association (KAA) is the governing body for the sport of athletics in the Kiribati. It is suspended by Kiribati National Olympic Committee and OAA since 2020.

== History ==
Athletes from Kiribati (then Gilbert Islands) participated already at the 1963, 1966, and 1971 South Pacific Games, as part of a combined Gilbert and Ellice Islands team. After separation of the Ellice Islands (now Tuvalu), and independence, athletes from now Kiribati attended the 1979 South Pacific Games for the first time. and the Micronesian Games in 1998.

The official foundation of KAA occurred in 1999, and its affiliation to the IAAF in the same year.

Mwaereiti Burennatu was elected new president of KAA in 2000. In April 2005, Simon Burennatu was elected president. He was followed by Tierata Taukaban. In July 2009, he was replaced by Arobati Brechtefeld who served until 2012.

President was Tonana George until his replacement by Brian Fukuyama in May 2019.

== Affiliations ==
- International Association of Athletics Federations (IAAF) This is now known as World Athletics. (WA)
- Oceania Athletics Association (OAA)

Moreover, it is part of the following national organisations:

- Kiribati National Olympic Committee (KNOC)

== National records ==
KAA maintains the Kiribati records in athletics.
