= Kenaz Kaniwete =

Kiribati sprinter (born 2008)

Personal information
- Born: 28 March 2008 (age 18) Kiribati

Sport
- Country: Kiribati
- Sport: Athletics
- Event: 100 m

Achievements and titles
- Personal bests: 11.29s (100 m); 23.31s (200 m)

Kenaz Kaniwete (born 28 March 2008) is an I-Kiribati sprinter. He made his international sporting debut at the age of fifteen, competing in the men's 100 and 200 metres at the 2023 Pacific Games. The following year, he qualified for the 2024 Summer Olympics to compete in the men's 100 metres through a universality slot, becoming the youngest athletics competitor of the games. He did not advance further from his preliminary round, though he set a new personal best and a national under-18 record in the event.

== Biography ==
Kenaz Kaniwete was born on 28 March 2008 in Kiribati. He has friends who are athletes that tried to qualify for the 2023 Pacific Games.

Kaniwete made his international debut at the age of fifteen at the 2023 Pacific Games in Honiara, Solomon Islands, where he competed in the men's 100 metres and 200 metres. In an interview before the Games with UNICEF, he stated his passion comes from representing his country at different competitions. He also desired for his friends to continue training to have the chance to represent the country at a future edition of the Pacific Games. He first competed in the preliminaries of the men's 100 metres on 27 November against seven other athletes, where he ran in a time of 11.43 seconds and placed fourth in the heat, not advancing further.

Two days later, he competed in the preliminaries of the men's 200 metres against seven other athletes. He ran in a time of 23.49 seconds for a new personal best and placed third in the heat, advancing further to the semi-finals. He competed the following day against eight other athletes in the round; he ran in a time of 23.61 seconds and placed fifth in the round, not advancing further.

His first competition in 2024 was the 2024 Oceania U18 Athletics Championships in Suva, Fiji, competing in the same events as the Pacific Games. The competition was held in conjunction with the 2024 Oceania Athletics Championships. In the preliminaries of the men's U18 100 metres, he placed fourth out of the sixth athletes in his heat with a time of 11.35 for a new personal best, not advancing further. For the men's U18 200 metres, he placed fifth out of eight athletes with a time of 23.31 seconds for another personal best, though he did not advance further. He also competed in an exhibition race in the men's 100 metres, placing fourth with a time of 11.60 against four other athletes.

For the 2024 Summer Olympics in Paris, France, Kiribati was eligible for a universality slot to send an athletics competitor to the games, which allows underrepresented nations to compete and let a National Olympic Committee to send athletes despite not meeting the standard qualification criteria. The nation would select Kaniwete, where he would compete in the men's 100 metres. He trained in Tarawa before the Summer Games. Coming into the event, Kaniwete was the youngest competitor across the athletics events at the games at sixteen years of age.

His event was held on 3 August at 10:42 a.m. at the Stade de France, where he raced in the second preliminary round heat against seven other competitors. He finished with a time of 11.29 seconds, placed fifth in the round but did not progress further. Despite not progressing, he set a new personal best and a national under-18 record in the event. Noah Lyles of the United States eventually won the gold in a time of 9.784 seconds.
