= Nera Tiebwa =

I-Kiribati judoka (born 2008)

Personal information
- Born: 2 October 2008
- Occupation: Judoka
- Height: 158 cm (5 ft 2 in)

Sport
- Country: Kiribati
- Sport: Judo
- Weight class: ‍–‍52 kg, ‍–‍57 kg

Achievements and titles
- Olympic Games: R32 (2024)

Profile at external databases
- IJF: 79808
- JudoInside.com: 165750
- Updated on 27 June 2025

Nera Tiebwa (born 2 October 2008) is an i-Kiribati judoka. She competed in the 2023 Pacific Games and at the 2024 Summer Olympics.

== Biography ==
Tiebwa was born 2 October 2008 in Kiribati. She is a judoka and competes in the lightweight class.

Tiebwa competed in the 2023 Pacific Games in the Solomon Islands, coming in 5th place. She beat Soloman Islander June Koidi in the quarter-final and Australian Anneliese Fielder in the semi-final, before losing to Vanuatuan Prisicillia Montouel in the bronze medal fight. She has also competed at the 2024 Tahiti Oceanian Open and the 2024 Dushanbe Grand Slam.

Aged 15, Tiebwa competed for the first time at the 2024 Summer Olympics, where she was one of three athletes representing Kiribati and the youngest judo fighter in all weight classes. She was also the Kiribati flagbearer alongside weightlifter Kaimauri Erati at the Opening Ceremony of the Games. She competed in judo in the class up to 57 kg at the Champ-de-Mars Arena. Her fight against Ukrainian Daria Bilodid lasted for five seconds, with Bilodid winning with an ippon, and was widely reported internationally.

Tiebwa competed at the 2024 Dushanbe Grand Slam in Tajikistan and the 2024 Oceanian Open in Tahiti, French Polynesia.

During July 2025, Tiebwa is scheduled to compete at the 2025 Pacific Mini Games in Palau.
