= Kiribati National Olympic Committee =

National athletic organization

- Country: Kiribati
- Code: KIR
- Created: 2002
- Recognized: 2003
- Continental Association: ONOC
- Headquarters: Teaoraereke, South Tarawa
- President: Nicholas McDermott
- Secretary General: Tenoa Betene

The Kiribati National Olympic Committee (IOC code: KIR) is the National Olympic Committee representing Kiribati. The same committee is also known as the Kiribati Commonwealth Games Association.

== See also ==
- Kiribati at the Olympics
- Kiribati at the Commonwealth Games
