= Flag of Kiribati =

- Use: National flag and ensign
- Proportion: 1:2
- Adopted: 12 July 1979; 47 years ago
- Design: A horizontal bicolour of red and blue with the yellow frigate bird flying over the rising sun with seventeen rays centered on the upper half and three white wavy horizontal stripes on the lower half.
- Designed by: Arthur Grimble

The flag of Kiribati (buraki ni Kiribati) is red in the upper half with a gold frigatebird (Fregata minor, in Gilbertese: te eitei) flying over a gold rising sun (otintaai), and the lower half is blue with three horizontal wavy white stripes to represent the ocean and the three archipelagoes (Gilbert, Phoenix and Line Islands). The 17 rays of the sun represent the 16 Gilbert Islands and Banaba (former Ocean Island).

The yellow frigatebird symbolises command over the sea, freedom, and dance patterns. The blue and white wavy bands represent the Pacific Ocean, which surrounds Kiribati, and the sun refers to Kiribati's position astride the Equator.

The flag is derived from a badge designed by Sir Arthur Grimble in 1931 for the flag of the Gilbert and Ellice Islands British colony and granted in 1937.

== Official description ==
Following the schedule 2 (section 8) of the National Identity Act of 1989, the official description is this one:

- "The bird is a frigate bird which represents power, freedom and Kiribati cultural dance patterns".
- "The rising sun is the tropical sun as Kiribati lies astride the Equator".
- "The sea is the Pacific Ocean which surrounds Kiribati".

== History ==
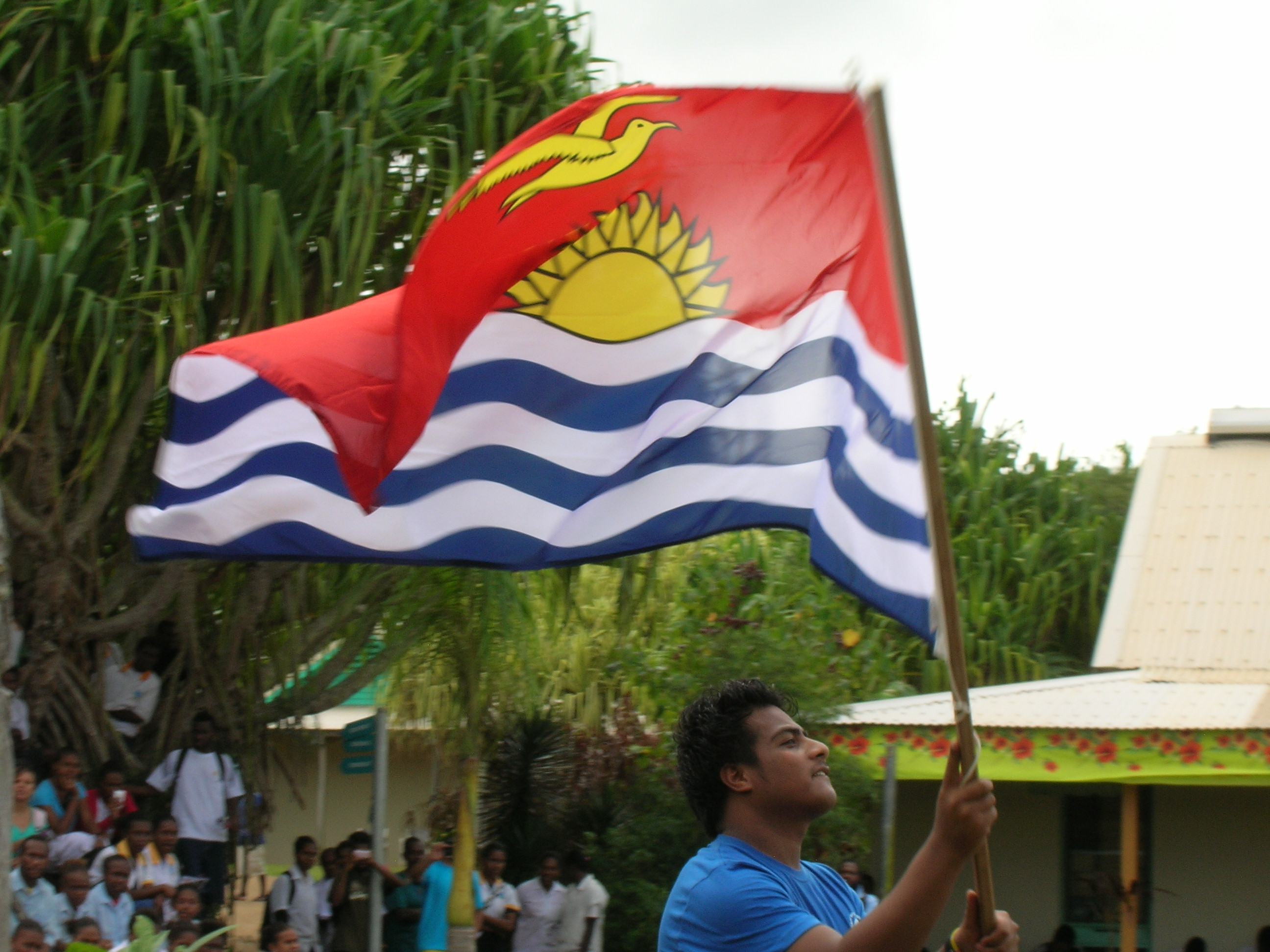
Flag of Kiribati

Kiribati's flag is an armorial banner, a flag having a design corresponding exactly to that of the shield in the coat of arms, the former badge of the flag of the British colony of the Gilbert and Ellice Islands. In a letter on 15 August 1892 to the Western Pacific High Commissioner, Arthur Grimble has written (concerning his badge proposal):

- "Sea. Represents the space of the ocean in which the colony is isolated".
- "Sun. The islands lie close to the 180 degree meridian. Sun is either rising or setting".
- "Bird. Frigate bird (Fregat Aquilla (sic)) symbolises power, poise and freedom. To the natives it is a sign of sovereignty and kingly birth, and highly regarded as such".

The coat of arms dates was then granted by the College of Arms in May 1937 when it was officially granted to the colony of Gilbert and Ellice Islands. The shield was incorporated into the centre of the fly half of a British Blue Ensign as the state ensign of the colony.

A competition was held to design a new flag in the run-up to national independence, and a design based on the colonial coat of arms was submitted to the College of Arms, which initially decided to modify the submission. Both the golden frigatebird and the sun were to be enlarged, whereas the widths of the waves was to be decreased. The locals insisted on the original design. The new flag was hoisted during the independence day celebrations in the capital, Tarawa, on 12 July 1979.

== Historical flags of Kiribati ==
Tongan Rule in Kiribati (1845–1862)

Tongan Rule in Kiribati (1862–1866)

Flag of the Kingdom of Abemama (April 1884 – June 1884)

Flag of the Kingdom of Abemama (June 1884 – 1889)

Flag of the Kingdom of Abemama (1889–1892)

Royal flag of the Kingdom of Abemama (1889–1892)

Flag of the Gilbert and Ellice Islands (1937–1976)

Flag of the Resident Commissioner and the Governor of the Gilbert and Ellice Islands (1937–1976)

Flag of the Japanese occupation of the Gilbert Islands (1941–1943)

Flag of the Gilbert Islands (1976–1979)
