= David Katoatau =

I-Kiribati weightlifter (born 1984)

Personal information
- Born: 17 July 1984 (age 42) Nonouti, Kiribati
- Height: 1.66 m (5 ft 5 1/2 in)
- Weight: 104.58 kg (230.6 lb)

Sport
- Country: Kiribati
- Sport: Weightlifting
- Partner: Ruby Ruevita
- Coached by: Kauabanga Riannaba
Medal record
Men's weightlifting
Representing Kiribati
Commonwealth Games
Gold medal – first place	2014 Glasgow	105 kg
Pacific Games
Gold medal – first place	2015 Port Moresby	105 kg
Gold medal – first place	2019 Apia	102 kg
Silver medal – second place	2007 Apia	85 kg
Silver medal – second place	2011 Nouméa	94 kg
Commonwealth Championships
Gold medal – first place	2009 Penang	85 kg
Gold medal – first place	2012 Apia	94 kg
Gold medal – first place	2013 Brisbane	105 kg
Gold medal – first place	2015 Pune	105 kg
Silver medal – second place	2016 Penang	105 kg
Silver medal – second place	2019 Apia	102 kg
Oceania Championships
Gold medal – first place	2007 Apia	94 kg
Gold medal – first place	2009 Darwin	94 kg
Gold medal – first place	2012 Apia	94 kg
Gold medal – first place	2013 Brisbane	105 kg
Gold medal – first place	2014 Le Mont-Dore	105 kg
Gold medal – first place	2015 Port Moresby	105 kg
Gold medal – first place	2016 Suva	105 kg
Gold medal – first place	2019 Apia	102 kg
Silver medal – second place	2021	102 kg
Bronze medal – third place	2006 Apia	85 kg
Bronze medal – third place	2010 Suva	94 kg
Bronze medal – third place	2011 Darwin (Note: Also the Arafura Games)	94 kg

David Katoatau (born 17 July 1984) is an I-Kiribati weightlifter who received international press attention due to dance routines he performed following his lifts at the 2016 Summer Olympics, in order to bring attention to the impact of climate change on Kiribati.

== Career ==
In 2007, Katoatau appeared at the 2007 World Weightlifting Championships in Chiang Mai, Thailand, where he ranked 37th in the 85 kg with a total lift of 281 kg; as well as at the 2008 Oceania Weightlifting Championships in Auckland, New Zealand, where he ranked 4th with a total of 292 kg.

Katoatau represented Kiribati in weightlifting at the 2008 Summer Olympics in Beijing, China, where he also served as the national flag bearer at the opening ceremony. He ultimately ranked 15th in the 85 kg category, with a total of 313 kg.

In 2012, Katoatau became the first I-Kiribati sportsperson to qualify on merit for the Olympic Games, rather than through receiving a wildcard invitation, when he competed at the 94 kg event at the 2012 Summer Olympics in London, United Kingdom. He finished 9th, with a total lift of 325 kg, and again served as Kiribati's flagbearer.

At the 2014 Commonwealth Games in Glasgow, United Kingdom, Katoatau won gold in the 105 kg group A, marking the first ever Commonwealth Games medal for Kiribati.

In 2016, Katoatau gained international press attention for dance routines he performed after completing clean and jerk lifts at the Summer Olympics in Rio de Janeiro, Brazil, which he stated he did in order to raise awareness of global warming in Kiribati.

== Personal life and activism ==
Katoatau was born in Nonouti, Kiribati, and grew up in Nauru, where his father worked in the phosphate industry. When he was 16, he moved to Apia, Samoa, to train at the Oceania Weightlifting Institute, due in part of the lack of appropriate training facilities in Kiribati. As of 2016, Katoatau lived in Nouméa, New Caledonia, where the Institute is now based

Katoatau is a climate activist, and has called for international action to prevent Kiribati from "disappearing" due to rising sea levels. In 2015, Katoatau's family home in Buota was destroyed by rising tides; at 2014 Commonwealth Games, Katoatau and his then-coach Paul Coffa had written an open letter raising attention to the issue of homes being lost to rising sea levels in Kiribati. Katoatau believes that Kiribati lacks the resources to fight climate change and needs the support of the international community.

Katoatau has cited Marcus Stephen, the first Nauruan to win gold at the Commonwealth Games, as among his inspirations. His younger brother, Ruben Katoatau, is also a weightlifter.

== Olympics statistics ==
Athlete	Year	Event	Snatch		Clean & Jerk		Total	Rank
Athlete	Year	Event	Result	Rank	Result	Rank	Total	Rank
David Katoatau	2008	85 kg	135 kg	18th	178 kg	15th	313 kg	15th
David Katoatau	2012	94 kg	140 kg	17th	185 kg	15th	325 kg	17th
David Katoatau	2016	105 kg	145 kg	17th	204 kg	12th	349 kg	14th

== See also ==
- Kiribati at the 2008 Summer Olympics
