= 2018 Australian Open – Women's singles qualifying =

Women's singles qualifying
- 2018 Australian Open

Events
Singles	men	women		boys	girls
Doubles	men	women	mixed	boys	girls
WC Singles	men	women	quad
WC Doubles	men	women	quad
Legends	men	women	mixed

Qualification
Singles	men	women
- Australian Open

This article displays the qualifying draw for women's singles at the 2018 Australian Open.

== Seeds ==
1. (United States) Sachia Vickery (first round)
2. (Russia) Evgeniya Rodina (second round)
3. (China) Zhu Lin (qualified)
4. (Switzerland) Viktorija Golubic (qualified)
5. (Belgium) Yanina Wickmayer (second round)
6. (Montenegro) Danka Kovinić (second round)
7. (United Kingdom) Naomi Broady (second round)
8. (Japan) Risa Ozaki (first round)
9. (Australia) Arina Rodionova (first round)
10. (Canada) Françoise Abanda (second round)
11. (Thailand) Luksika Kumkhum (qualified)
12. (Japan) Miyu Kato (first round)
13. (Czech Republic) Barbora Krejčíková (qualifying competition)
14. (United States) Bernarda Pera (qualifying competition, lucky loser)
15. (United States) Irina Falconi (qualified)
16. (Slovakia) Viktória Kužmová (qualified)
17. (Japan) Misaki Doi (first round)
18. (Czech Republic) Denisa Allertová (qualified)
19. (Italy) Roberta Vinci (first round)
20. (Italy) Sara Errani (qualifying competition)
21. (China) Han Xinyun (second round)
22. (Belarus) Vera Lapko (second round)
23. (Netherlands) Arantxa Rus (first round)
24. (United States) Julia Boserup (second round)

== Qualifiers ==
1. (Russia) Anna Kalinskaya
2. (Russia) Anna Blinkova
3. (China) Zhu Lin
4. (Switzerland) Viktorija Golubic
5. (United States) Irina Falconi
6. (Czech Republic) Denisa Allertová
7. (Serbia) Ivana Jorović
8. (Slovakia) Viktória Kužmová
9. (Ukraine) Marta Kostyuk
10. (Slovakia) Anna Karolína Schmiedlová
11. (Thailand) Luksika Kumkhum
12. (Poland) Magdalena Fręch

== Lucky loser ==
1. (Bulgaria) Viktoriya Tomova
2. (United States) Bernarda Pera

== Draw ==
=== First qualifier ===
First round
1	(United States) Sachia Vickery	7^{7}	4	3
(Netherlands) Lesley Kerkhove	6^{2}	6	6
(Slovenia) Tamara Zidanšek	6	6
(Japan) Eri Hozumi	3	3
(Russia) Anna Kalinskaya	6	2	6
(Russia) Vera Zvonareva	2	6	0
(Turkey) Çağla Büyükakçay	4	4
24	(United States) Julia Boserup	6	6

Second round
(Netherlands) Lesley Kerkhove	6	6
(Slovenia) Tamara Zidanšek	4	2
(Russia) Anna Kalinskaya	6	6
24	(United States) Julia Boserup	1	4

Qualifying competition
(Netherlands) Lesley Kerkhove	4	5
(Russia) Anna Kalinskaya	6	7

=== Second qualifier ===
First round
2	(Russia) Evgeniya Rodina	6	6
(Uzbekistan) Sabina Sharipova	3	4
(Belgium) Maryna Zanevska	5	7^{7}	2
(Bulgaria) Viktoriya Tomova	7	6^{2}	6
(Italy) Deborah Chiesa	6	6^{5}	3
(Germany) Antonia Lottner	2	7^{7}	6
(Russia) Anna Blinkova	6	6
19	(Italy) Roberta Vinci	3	2

Second round
2	(Russia) Evgeniya Rodina	2	2
(Bulgaria) Viktoriya Tomova	6	6
(Germany) Antonia Lottner	7	4	5
(Russia) Anna Blinkova	5	6	7

Qualifying competition
(Bulgaria) Viktoriya Tomova	3	6	1
(Russia) Anna Blinkova	6	1	6

=== Third qualifier ===
First round
3	(China) Zhu Lin	6	4	6
(United States) Louisa Chirico	2	6	4
(Greece) Valentini Grammatikopoulou	6	4	6
WC	(Australia) Ellen Perez	3	6	2
(Romania) Alexandra Dulgheru	6	6
(Canada) Bianca Andreescu	1	1
(Ukraine) Dayana Yastremska	6	6
17	(Japan) Misaki Doi	3	1

Second round
3	(China) Zhu Lin	4	6	7
(Greece) Valentini Grammatikopoulou	6	2	5
(Romania) Alexandra Dulgheru	7^{8}	6
(Ukraine) Dayana Yastremska	6^{6}	0

Qualifying competition
3	(China) Zhu Lin	6	6
(Romania) Alexandra Dulgheru	4	4

=== Fourth qualifier ===
First round
4	(Switzerland) Viktorija Golubic	3	7^{7}	6
(Hungary) Fanny Stollár	6	6^{5}	1
(Spain) Sílvia Soler Espinosa	6	3	6
(France) Myrtille Georges	4	6	1
(Romania) Irina Bara	7	3	7
(Bulgaria) Sesil Karatantcheva	5	6	5
(Switzerland) Patty Schnyder	3	6^{4}
14	(United States) Bernarda Pera	6	7^{7}

Second round
4	(Switzerland) Viktorija Golubic	6	6
(Spain) Sílvia Soler Espinosa	1	1
(Romania) Irina Bara	6	2	3
14	(United States) Bernarda Pera	4	6	6

Qualifying competition
4	(Switzerland) Viktorija Golubic	6	6
14	(United States) Bernarda Pera	3	2

=== Fifth qualifier ===
First round
5	(Belgium) Yanina Wickmayer	6	7^{7}
(Switzerland) Jil Teichmann	4	6^{5}
WC	(Australia) Priscilla Hon	4	7^{7}	6
PR	(Czech Republic) Barbora Štefková	6	6^{4}	4
(Russia) Polina Monova	6	6
(Russia) Valentyna Ivakhnenko	3	3
(Turkey) Başak Eraydın	1	0
15	(United States) Irina Falconi	6	6

Second round
5	(Belgium) Yanina Wickmayer	6	5	1
WC	(Australia) Priscilla Hon	2	7	6
(Russia) Polina Monova	2	6^{2}
15	(United States) Irina Falconi	6	7^{7}

Qualifying competition
WC	(Australia) Priscilla Hon	2	1
15	(United States) Irina Falconi	6	6

=== Sixth qualifier ===
First round
6	(Montenegro) Danka Kovinić	6	7^{7}
WC	(Australia) Naiktha Bains	3	6^{4}
(United States) Danielle Collins	7	6
(Russia) Irina Khromacheva	5	3
(United States) Asia Muhammad	1	6	5
(Bulgaria) Elitsa Kostova	6	3	7
(Canada) Carol Zhao	3	0
18	(Czech Republic) Denisa Allertová	6	6

Second round
6	(Montenegro) Danka Kovinić	6	2	5
(United States) Danielle Collins	4	6	7
(Bulgaria) Elitsa Kostova	6^{5}	2
18	(Czech Republic) Denisa Allertová	7^{7}	6

Qualifying competition
(United States) Danielle Collins	0	1
18	(Czech Republic) Denisa Allertová	6	6

=== Seventh qualifier ===
First round
7	(United Kingdom) Naomi Broady	7^{7}	5	6
(Liechtenstein) Kathinka von Deichmann	6^{4}	7	3
(Italy) Georgia Brescia	5	5
(Netherlands) Bibiane Schoofs	7	7
(Belgium) Ysaline Bonaventure	7^{7}	7
WC	(Australia) Tammi Patterson	6^{1}	5
(Serbia) Ivana Jorović	6	6
23	(Netherlands) Arantxa Rus	3	4

Second round
7	(United Kingdom) Naomi Broady	6^{5}	2
(Netherlands) Bibiane Schoofs	7^{7}	6
(Belgium) Ysaline Bonaventure	4	6^{6}
(Serbia) Ivana Jorović	6	7^{8}

Qualifying competition
(Netherlands) Bibiane Schoofs	3	3
(Serbia) Ivana Jorović	6	6

=== Eighth qualifier ===
First round
8	(Japan) Risa Ozaki	7	6^{6}	1
(Japan) Miharu Imanishi	5	7^{8}	6
(Japan) Junri Namigata	3	1
(Czech Republic) Marie Bouzková	6	6
(United States) Caroline Dolehide	5	6	7^{9}
(Switzerland) Conny Perrin	7	3	6^{7}
(Spain) María Teresa Torró Flor	4	4
16	(Slovakia) Viktória Kužmová	6	6

Second round
(Japan) Miharu Imanishi	4	1
(Czech Republic) Marie Bouzková	6	6
(United States) Caroline Dolehide	2	4
16	(Slovakia) Viktória Kužmová	6	6

Qualifying competition
(Czech Republic) Marie Bouzková	4	5
16	(Slovakia) Viktória Kužmová	6	7

=== Ninth qualifier ===
First round
9	(Australia) Arina Rodionova	6	3	3
WC	(Ukraine) Marta Kostyuk	4	6	6
(United States) Jamie Loeb	6	5	3
(Chile) Daniela Seguel	3	7	6
(China) Liu Fangzhou	5	6	6
(Sweden) Rebecca Peterson	7	2	4
(Italy) Jasmine Paolini	2	1
13	(Czech Republic) Barbora Krejčíková	6	6

Second round
WC	(Ukraine) Marta Kostyuk	1	6	6
(Chile) Daniela Seguel	6	4	2
(China) Liu Fangzhou	1	1
13	(Czech Republic) Barbora Krejčíková	6	6

Qualifying competition
WC	(Ukraine) Marta Kostyuk	6	5	6
13	(Czech Republic) Barbora Krejčíková	3	7	0

=== Tenth qualifier ===
First round
10	(Canada) Françoise Abanda	6	6
(China) Lu Jiajing	4	3
WC	(Australia) Isabelle Wallace	7	3	3
(Slovakia) Anna Karolína Schmiedlová	5	6	6
(Turkey) İpek Soylu	4	2
(Switzerland) Stefanie Vögele	6	6
(Romania) Alexandra Cadanțu	3	1
22	(Belarus) Vera Lapko	6	6

Second round
10	(Canada) Françoise Abanda	6	2	4
(Slovakia) Anna Karolína Schmiedlová	4	6	6
(Switzerland) Stefanie Vögele	6	7
22	(Belarus) Vera Lapko	3	5

Qualifying competition
(Slovakia) Anna Karolína Schmiedlová	6	6
(Switzerland) Stefanie Vögele	3	2

=== Eleventh qualifier ===
First round
11	(Thailand) Luksika Kumkhum	6	6
(Czech Republic) Tereza Martincová	3	0
(South Korea) Jang Su-jeong	2	3
(Slovenia) Dalila Jakupović	6	6
(China) Wang Yafan	6	6
(Austria) Barbara Haas	4	3
(China) Lu Jingjing	6^{2}	3
20	(Italy) Sara Errani	7^{7}	6

Second round
11	(Thailand) Luksika Kumkhum	6	6
(Slovenia) Dalila Jakupović	3	4
(China) Wang Yafan	3	4
20	(Italy) Sara Errani	6	6

Qualifying competition
11	(Thailand) Luksika Kumkhum	6	6
20	(Italy) Sara Errani	4	1

=== Twelfth qualifier ===
First round
12	(Japan) Miyu Kato	4	3
(Poland) Magdalena Fręch	6	6
(Russia) Sofya Zhuk	7	6
WC	(Australia) Sara Tomic	5	2
(United Kingdom) Katie Boulter	4	7^{7}	2^{r}
(United States) Kayla Day	6	6^{1}	5
WC	(Australia) Kimberly Birrell	6^{4}	6	3
21	(China) Han Xinyun	7^{7}	3	6

Second round
(Poland) Magdalena Fręch	6	4	6
(Russia) Sofya Zhuk	3	6	2
(United States) Kayla Day	7^{7}	6
21	(China) Han Xinyun	6^{5}	0

Qualifying competition
(Poland) Magdalena Fręch	6	6
(United States) Kayla Day	3	0
