= 2018 Australian Open – Men's singles qualifying =

Men's singles qualifying
- 2018 Australian Open

Events
Singles	men	women		boys	girls
Doubles	men	women	mixed	boys	girls
WC Singles	men	women	quad
WC Doubles	men	women	quad
Legends	men	women	mixed

Qualification
Singles	men	women
- Australian Open

This article displays the qualifying draw for men's singles at the 2018 Australian Open.

== Seeds ==
1. (United States) Taylor Fritz (second round)
2. (France) Nicolas Mahut (first round)
3. (Italy) Marco Cecchinato (first round)
4. (United States) Bjorn Fratangelo (qualifying competition)
5. (Canada) Vasek Pospisil (qualified)
6. (United Kingdom) Cameron Norrie (second round)
7. (Spain) Roberto Carballés Baena (first round)
8. (Portugal) Gastão Elias (first round)
9. (Kazakhstan) Alexander Bublik (second round)
10. (Germany) Yannick Hanfmann (second round)
11. (United States) Ernesto Escobedo (qualifying competition)
12. (Brazil) Thiago Monteiro (first round)
13. (Belgium) Ruben Bemelmans (qualified)
14. (Switzerland) Henri Laaksonen (first round)
15. (India) Yuki Bhambri (qualified)
16. (Ukraine) Sergiy Stakhovsky (first round)
17. (Germany) Dustin Brown (qualified)
18. (Spain) Adrián Menéndez Maceiras (first round)
19. (Bosnia and Herzegovina) Mirza Bašić (first round)
20. (Italy) Matteo Berrettini (qualifying competition, lucky loser)
21. (Italy) Stefano Travaglia (second round)
22. (France) Quentin Halys (qualified)
23. (Germany) Oscar Otte (first round)
24. (Slovakia) Norbert Gombos (second round)
25. (Norway) Casper Ruud (qualified)
26. (Canada) Peter Polansky (qualifying competition, lucky loser)
27. (Sweden) Elias Ymer (qualified)
28. (India) Ramkumar Ramanathan (qualifying competition)
29. (Australia) Bernard Tomic (qualifying competition)
30. (Austria) Sebastian Ofner (first round)
31. (Belarus) Uladzimir Ignatik (first round)
32. (Argentina) Renzo Olivo (first round)

== Qualifiers ==
1. (Italy) Salvatore Caruso
2. (Austria) Dennis Novak
3. (Spain) Jaume Munar
4. (France) Quentin Halys
5. (Canada) Vasek Pospisil
6. (United States) Kevin King
7. (United States) Denis Kudla
8. (United States) Mackenzie McDonald
9. (Sweden) Elias Ymer
10. (Germany) Dustin Brown
11. (Norway) Casper Ruud
12. (Italy) Lorenzo Sonego
13. (Belgium) Ruben Bemelmans
14. (Czech Republic) Václav Šafránek
15. (India) Yuki Bhambri
16. (Germany) Matthias Bachinger

== Lucky losers ==
1. (Canada) Peter Polansky
2. (Italy) Matteo Berrettini

== Draw ==
=== First qualifier ===
First round
1	(United States) Taylor Fritz	6	3	7^{7}
(Australia) Sam Groth	4	6	6^{3}
(Belgium) Arthur De Greef	6	3	4
(France) Mathias Bourgue	3	6	6
(Italy) Salvatore Caruso	6	6
(Turkey) Cem İlkel	2	4
WC	(Australia) Maverick Banes	7^{7}	4	6^{5}
24	(Slovakia) Norbert Gombos	6^{5}	6	7^{7}

Second round
1	(United States) Taylor Fritz	6^{3}	6	4
(France) Mathias Bourgue	7^{7}	0	6
(Italy) Salvatore Caruso	3	6	6
24	(Slovakia) Norbert Gombos	6	3	3

Qualifying competition
(France) Mathias Bourgue	6	6^{5}	4
(Italy) Salvatore Caruso	3	7^{7}	6

=== Second qualifier ===
First round
2	(France) Nicolas Mahut	6^{4}	3
(Serbia) Danilo Petrović	7^{7}	6
(Belarus) Ilya Ivashka	4	6	6^{5}
(Austria) Dennis Novak	6	4	7^{7}
(Russia) Alexey Vatutin	6	5	6
(Chinese Taipei) Jason Jung	1	7	2
(Japan) Go Soeda	6	7^{7}
23	(Germany) Oscar Otte	3	6^{5}

Second round
(Serbia) Danilo Petrović	7^{7}	4	5
(Austria) Dennis Novak	6^{5}	6	7
(Russia) Alexey Vatutin	3	0
(Japan) Go Soeda	6	6

Qualifying competition
(Austria) Dennis Novak	4	6	6
(Japan) Go Soeda	6	2	2

=== Third qualifier ===
First round
3	(Italy) Marco Cecchinato	3	6^{3}
WC	(Australia) Bradley Mousley	6	7^{7}
(Spain) Ricardo Ojeda Lara	7^{10}	3	6
(Italy) Luca Vanni	6^{8}	6	3
(Spain) Jaume Munar	6	6
(Italy) Andrea Arnaboldi	2	4
(Serbia) Nikola Milojević	4	7^{7}	4
21	(Italy) Stefano Travaglia	6	6^{5}	6

Second round
WC	(Australia) Bradley Mousley	5	6	6
(Spain) Ricardo Ojeda Lara	7	3	4
(Spain) Jaume Munar	6	6
21	(Italy) Stefano Travaglia	2	2

Qualifying competition
WC	(Australia) Bradley Mousley	5	2
(Spain) Jaume Munar	7	6

=== Fourth qualifier ===
First round
4	(United States) Bjorn Fratangelo	7^{7}	6
(United States) Mitchell Krueger	6^{4}	3
(Argentina) Facundo Bagnis	6	6^{7}	2
WC	(Hungary) Zsombor Piros	4	7^{9}	6
(Czech Republic) Adam Pavlásek	6	3	6^{3}
(Serbia) Peđa Krstin	3	6	7^{7}
(Argentina) Marco Trungelliti	2	7	6^{4}
22	(France) Quentin Halys	6	5	7^{7}

Second round
4	(United States) Bjorn Fratangelo	6	6
WC	(Hungary) Zsombor Piros	3	4
(Serbia) Peđa Krstin	6	3	0
22	(France) Quentin Halys	4	6	6

Qualifying competition
4	(United States) Bjorn Fratangelo	5	1
22	(France) Quentin Halys	7	6

=== Fifth qualifier ===
First round
5	(Canada) Vasek Pospisil	7	7^{7}
(Italy) Lorenzo Giustino	5	6^{5}
(United States) Alexander Sarkissian	7^{7}	6^{4}	0^{r}
(Italy) Stefano Napolitano	6^{5}	7^{7}	4
(France) Gleb Sakharov	7^{7}	6
(Israel) Edan Leshem	6^{4}	4
(United States) Bradley Klahn	7^{8}	6^{3}	2
28	(India) Ramkumar Ramanathan	6^{6}	7^{7}	6

Second round
5	(Canada) Vasek Pospisil	6	6^{5}	7
(Italy) Stefano Napolitano	1	7^{7}	5
(France) Gleb Sakharov	4	6^{10}
28	(India) Ramkumar Ramanathan	6	7^{12}

Qualifying competition
5	(Canada) Vasek Pospisil	6	4	6
28	(India) Ramkumar Ramanathan	4	6	4

=== Sixth qualifier ===
First round
6	(United Kingdom) Cameron Norrie	6	6^{4}	6
(Canada) Filip Peliwo	1	7^{7}	4
(Bosnia and Herzegovina) Aldin Šetkić	2	7^{7}	3
(Australia) John-Patrick Smith	6	6^{5}	6
(Czech Republic) Zdeněk Kolář	7^{7}	6
(Japan) Yasutaka Uchiyama	6^{5}	4
(United States) Kevin King	7^{7}	6
31	(Belarus) Uladzimir Ignatik	6^{2}	2

Second round
6	(United Kingdom) Cameron Norrie	4	2
(Australia) John-Patrick Smith	6	6
(Czech Republic) Zdeněk Kolář	1	6^{2}
(United States) Kevin King	6	7^{7}

Qualifying competition
(Australia) John-Patrick Smith	4	6^{6}
(United States) Kevin King	6	7^{8}

=== Seventh qualifier ===
First round
7	(Spain) Roberto Carballés Baena	3	5
(United States) Denis Kudla	6	7
(India) Prajnesh Gunneswaran	6	1	2
(Germany) Tobias Kamke	4	6	6
(Russia) Teymuraz Gabashvili	3	6	3
(Poland) Hubert Hurkacz	6	3	6
(United Kingdom) Liam Broady	7	3	6^{5}
20	(Italy) Matteo Berrettini	5	6	7^{7}

Second round
(United States) Denis Kudla	6	7
(Germany) Tobias Kamke	2	5
(Poland) Hubert Hurkacz	6^{5}	3
20	(Italy) Matteo Berrettini	7^{7}	6

Qualifying competition
(United States) Denis Kudla	4	6	7
20	(Italy) Matteo Berrettini	6	3	5

=== Eighth qualifier ===
First round
8	(Portugal) Gastão Elias	2	2
(Slovakia) Jozef Kovalík	6	6
(United States) Mackenzie McDonald	6	6
(United States) Noah Rubin	1	0
(El Salvador) Marcelo Arévalo	2	7	5
(Egypt) Karim-Mohamed Maamoun	6	5	7
(France) Stéphane Robert	7^{7}	7
30	(Austria) Sebastian Ofner	6^{5}	5

Second round
(Slovakia) Jozef Kovalík	2	2
(United States) Mackenzie McDonald	6	6
(Egypt) Karim-Mohamed Maamoun	6	2	2^{r}
(France) Stéphane Robert	4	6	4

Qualifying competition
(United States) Mackenzie McDonald	7^{7}	6^{7}	6
(France) Stéphane Robert	6^{5}	7^{9}	4

=== Ninth qualifier ===
First round
9	(Kazakhstan) Alexander Bublik	6	1	6
(Portugal) Gonçalo Oliveira	3	6	3
(Barbados) Darian King	6	7^{7}
WC	(Australia) Marc Polmans	2	6^{3}
WC	(Australia) Marinko Matosevic	3	6^{3}
(United States) Dennis Novikov	6	7^{7}
(France) Kenny de Schepper	2	6^{2}
27	(Sweden) Elias Ymer	6	7^{7}

Second round
9	(Kazakhstan) Alexander Bublik	5	0
(Barbados) Darian King	7	6
(United States) Dennis Novikov	7^{7}	3	3
27	(Sweden) Elias Ymer	6^{3}	6	6

Qualifying competition
(Barbados) Darian King	3	4
27	(Sweden) Elias Ymer	6	6

=== Tenth qualifier ===
First round
10	(Germany) Yannick Hanfmann	6	7^{10}
(United States) Evan King	1	6^{8}
(United States) Stefan Kozlov	7^{7}	4	7^{7}
WC	(Australia) Blake Ellis	6^{3}	6	6^{3}
(China) Wu Di	6	7^{7}
WC	(Australia) Dayne Kelly	1	6^{3}
(Argentina) Guido Andreozzi	3	6	3
17	(Germany) Dustin Brown	6	3	6

Second round
10	(Germany) Yannick Hanfmann	6	6^{2}	4
(United States) Stefan Kozlov	4	7^{7}	6
(China) Wu Di	6	4	6^{16}
17	(Germany) Dustin Brown	3	6	7^{18}

Qualifying competition
(United States) Stefan Kozlov	4	6	3
17	(Germany) Dustin Brown	6	3	6

=== Eleventh qualifier ===
First round
11	(United States) Ernesto Escobedo	6	6
PR	(Spain) Pablo Andújar	2	2
(Italy) Alessandro Giannessi	7^{7}	3	6
(India) Sumit Nagal	6^{5}	6	3
WC	(Australia) Max Purcell	4	6^{4}
(Kazakhstan) Dmitry Popko	6	7^{7}
(Japan) Tatsuma Ito	6	1	4
25	(Norway) Casper Ruud	4	6	6

Second round
11	(United States) Ernesto Escobedo	6	6
(Italy) Alessandro Giannessi	3	2
(Kazakhstan) Dmitry Popko	5	3
25	(Norway) Casper Ruud	7	6

Qualifying competition
11	(United States) Ernesto Escobedo	2	7^{7}	1
25	(Norway) Casper Ruud	6	6^{2}	6

=== Twelfth qualifier ===
First round
12	(Brazil) Thiago Monteiro	5	3
(Italy) Lorenzo Sonego	7	6
(Estonia) Jürgen Zopp	4	3
(Egypt) Mohamed Safwat	6	6
(United States) Tommy Paul	6^{3}	7^{7}	7^{7}
(Slovenia) Blaž Rola	7^{7}	6^{2}	6^{5}
(France) Vincent Millot	1	3
29	(Australia) Bernard Tomic	6	6

Second round
(Italy) Lorenzo Sonego	6	7^{7}
(Egypt) Mohamed Safwat	3	6^{5}
(United States) Tommy Paul	0	7^{7}	6^{4}
29	(Australia) Bernard Tomic	6	6^{5}	7^{7}

Qualifying competition
(Italy) Lorenzo Sonego	6	6^{5}	6
29	(Australia) Bernard Tomic	1	7^{7}	4

=== Thirteenth qualifier ===
First round
13	(Belgium) Ruben Bemelmans	7	5	7
(Poland) Kamil Majchrzak	5	7	5
(Serbia) Miomir Kecmanović	6	6^{5}	4
(Croatia) Viktor Galović	4	7^{7}	6
(China) Zhang Ze	3	6	3
(South Korea) Lee Duck-hee	6	3	6
PR	(Canada) Frank Dancevic	3	7^{8}	6
18	(Spain) Adrián Menéndez Maceiras	6	6^{6}	3

Second round
13	(Belgium) Ruben Bemelmans	5	6	7
(Croatia) Viktor Galović	7	3	5
(South Korea) Lee Duck-hee	4	7^{10}	6
PR	(Canada) Frank Dancevic	6	6^{8}	3

Qualifying competition
13	(Belgium) Ruben Bemelmans	6	6
(South Korea) Lee Duck-hee	4	4

=== Fourteenth qualifier ===
First round
14	(Switzerland) Henri Laaksonen	4	3
(Italy) Federico Gaio	6	6
(Argentina) Andrea Collarini	6^{5}	6	6
(Brazil) João Souza	7^{7}	2	4
(Australia) Andrew Whittington	7^{7}	6
(United States) Michael Mmoh	6^{2}	1
(Czech Republic) Václav Šafránek	7^{7}	6
32	(Argentina) Renzo Olivo	6^{2}	2

Second round
(Italy) Federico Gaio	3	7^{7}	4
(Argentina) Andrea Collarini	6	6^{4}	6
(Australia) Andrew Whittington	2	3
(Czech Republic) Václav Šafránek	6	6

Qualifying competition
(Argentina) Andrea Collarini	6^{5}	2
(Czech Republic) Václav Šafránek	7^{7}	6

=== Fifteenth qualifier ===
First round
15	(India) Yuki Bhambri	1	6	6
(Canada) Brayden Schnur	6	3	4
(Portugal) João Monteiro	2	6	5
(Spain) Carlos Taberner	6	4	7
(United States) Christian Harrison	7^{7}	7^{10}
(United States) Reilly Opelka	6^{0}	6^{8}
(Portugal) João Domingues	6^{2}	4
26	(Canada) Peter Polansky	7^{7}	6

Second round
15	(India) Yuki Bhambri	6	6
(Spain) Carlos Taberner	0	2
(United States) Christian Harrison	2	5
26	(Canada) Peter Polansky	6	7

Qualifying competition
15	(India) Yuki Bhambri	1	6	6
26	(Canada) Peter Polansky	6	3	3

=== Sixteenth qualifier ===
First round
16	(Ukraine) Sergiy Stakhovsky	6	6^{4}	3
(Germany) Matthias Bachinger	4	7^{7}	6
WC	(Australia) Omar Jasika	2	4
PR	(Australia) James Duckworth	6	6
(Bosnia and Herzegovina) Tomislav Brkić	4	5
(France) Calvin Hemery	6	7
PR	(Colombia) Alejandro González	7^{7}	6
19	(Bosnia and Herzegovina) Mirza Bašić	6^{2}	2

Second round
(Germany) Matthias Bachinger	6	6
PR	(Australia) James Duckworth	4	4
(France) Calvin Hemery	3	4
PR	(Colombia) Alejandro González	6	6

Qualifying competition
(Germany) Matthias Bachinger	6	6
PR	(Colombia) Alejandro González	1	4
