= Christian Didier Chin =

Malaysian tennis player (born 2000)

Christian Chin
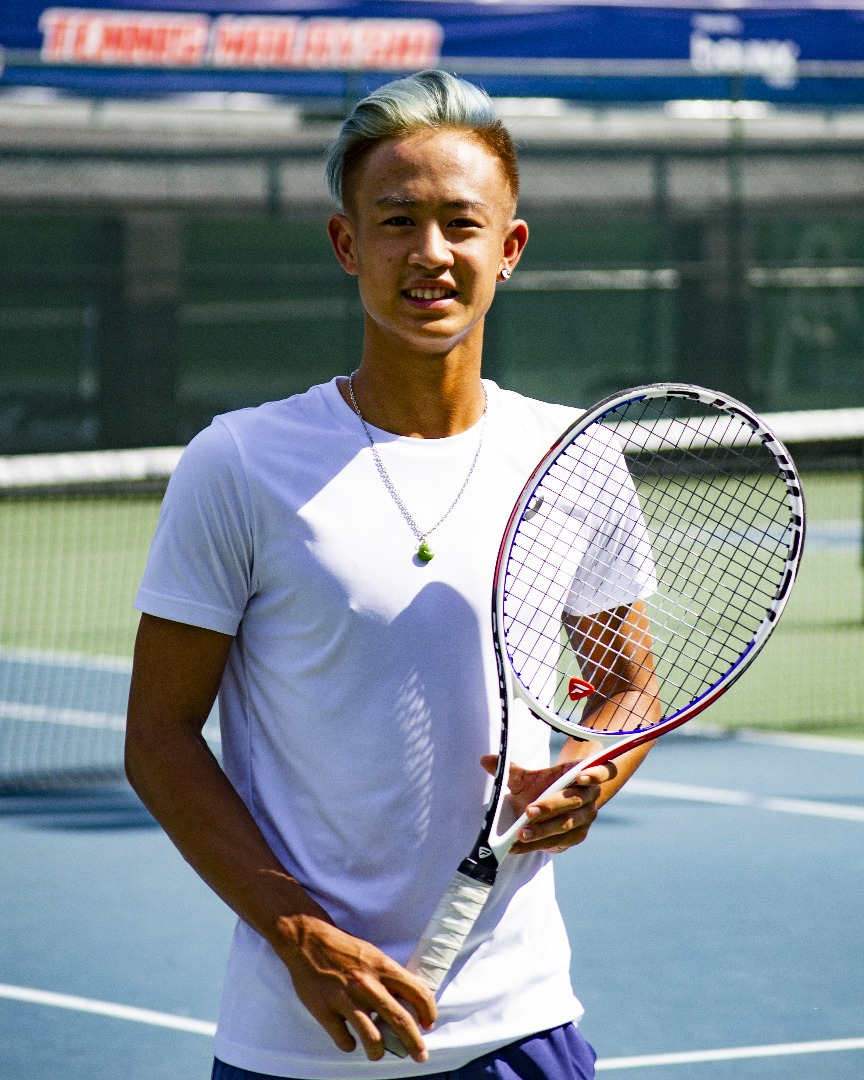
- Christian during one of his daily training sessions
- Full name: Christian Didier Chin
- Country (sports): Malaysia
- Residence: Kuala Lumpur
- Born: 23 August 2000 (age 26) Sabah, Malaysia
- Plays: Right-handed (two-handed backhand)
- Prize money: $3,765

Singles
- Career record: 0–1 (at ATP Tour level, Grand Slam level, and in Davis Cup)
- Career titles: 0
- Highest ranking: No. 1,440 (23 September 2019)

Grand Slam singles results
- Australian Open Junior: 2R (2018)

Doubles
- Career record: 2–0 (at ATP Tour level, Grand Slam level, and in Davis Cup)
- Career titles: 0 1 ITF
- Highest ranking: No. 1,130 (18 November 2019)

Grand Slam doubles results
- Australian Open Junior: 2R (2018)

Team competitions
- Davis Cup: 8–7
Medal record
Men's padel
Representing Malaysia
Asian Games
Silver medal – second place	2026 Aichi-Nagoya	Men's pairs

Christian Didier Chin (born 23 August 2000) is a professional Malaysian tennis player with a career high ITF junior combined ranking of 44 achieved on 1 January 2018.

Chin has a career high ATP doubles ranking of No. 1,130 achieved on 18 November 2019 and ATP singles ranking of No. 1,440 achieved on 23 September 2019.

Chin has represented Malaysia at the Davis Cup, where he has a win-loss record of 8–7.
