= Padel at the 2026 Asian Games – Men's pairs =

Men's pairs at the 2026 Asian Games
- Venue: Higashi Sports Center
- Dates: 28 September – 3 October 2026
- Competitors: 40 from 12 nations

Medalists
| gold medal | Mashari Naif; Rashed Naif | Qatar |
| silver medal | Christian Didier Chin; Aidan Yunus | Malaysia |
| bronze medal | Farsad Shahi; Amir Mohammad Jamshidi | Iran |

The men's pairs padel tournament at the 2026 Asian Games was held from 28 September to 3 October 2026 at the Nagoya City Higashi Sports Center in Higashi, Nagoya, Japan.

== Schedule ==
All times are Japan Standard Time (UTC+09:00)

| Date | Time | Event |
|---|---|---|
| Monday, 28 September 2026 | 11:00 | 1st round |
| Tuesday, 29 September 2026 | 16:00 | 2nd round |
| Wednesday, 30 September 2023 | 10:00 | 2nd round |
| Thursday, 1 October 2023 | 10:00 | Quarterfinals |
| Friday, 2 October 2023 | 13:00 | Semifinals |
| Saturday, 3 October 2023 | 13:00 | Finals |

== Results ==
=== Finals ===
| Gold medal match |
| 1 | Mashari Naif (QAT); Rashed Naif (QAT) | 6 | 6 |
| 3 | Christian Didier Chin (MAS); Aidan Yunus (MAS) | 3 | 1 |

| Bronze medal match |
| 4 | Hami Golestan (IRI); Aria Roghani (IRI) | 3 | 4 |
| 2 | Farsad Shahi (IRI); Amir Mohammad Jamshidi (IRI) | 6 | 6 |

=== Top half ===
1st round
Teruaki Ando (JPN); Shinnosuke Nakamura (JPN) | 7^{7} | 2 | 6
Tamim El-Hallak (LBN); Ralph Tohme (LBN) | 6^{4} | 6 | 4
Mohammed Aziz Khan (HKG); Sean Lo Escoto (HKG) | 3 | 7 | 6
Zhakas Kozbak (KAZ); Rodion Pak (KAZ) | 6 | 5 | 4

2nd round
1 | Mashari Naif (QAT); Rashed Naif (QAT) | 6 | 6
Abdulaziz Redha (KUW); Fouad Behbehani (KUW) | 1 | 0
Abdulqoahar Allian (PHI); Raymark Gulfo (PHI) | 1 | 0
7 | Fares Al-Janahi (UAE); Abdulla Al-Abdulla (UAE) | 6 | 6
8 | Valentinus Ngurah (INA); Armando Soemarno (INA) | 3 | 4
Teruaki Ando (JPN); Shinnosuke Nakamura (JPN) | 6 | 6
Mohammed Aziz Khan (HKG); Sean Lo Escoto (HKG) | 1 | 0
4 | Hami Golestan (IRI); Aria Roghani (IRI) | 6 | 6

Quarterfinals
1 | Mashari Naif (QAT); Rashed Naif (QAT) | 6 | 6
7 | Fares Al-Janahi (UAE); Abdulla Al-Abdulla (UAE) | 2 | 3
Teruaki Ando (JPN); Shinnosuke Nakamura (JPN) | 4 | 5
4 | Hami Golestan (IRI); Aria Roghani (IRI) | 6 | 7

Semifinals
1 | Mashari Naif (QAT); Rashed Naif (QAT) | 6 | 6
4 | Hami Golestan (IRI); Aria Roghani (IRI) | 4 | 2

=== Bottom half ===
1st round
Timur Khabibulin (KAZ); Yevgeniy Danilov (KAZ) | 7 | 2 | 7^{7}
Hassan Waly (QAT); Mohammed Al-Kuwari (QAT) | 5 | 6 | 6^{3}
Giorgio Soemarno (INA); Christian Alvin Edison (INA) | 1 | 4
Jason Lapidus (PHI); Argil Lance Cañizares (PHI) | 6 | 6

2nd round
3 | Christian Didier Chin (MAS); Aidan Yunus (MAS) | 6 | 3 | 6
Timur Khabibulin (KAZ); Yevgeniy Danilov (KAZ) | 2 | 6 | 3
Jason Lapidus (PHI); Argil Lance Cañizares (PHI) | 6 | 6
6 | Vincent Chau (HKG); Lawrence Lo (HKG) | 2 | 2
5 | Kazuki Tomita (JPN); Nasa Hatakeyama (JPN) | 6 | 6
Arnav Rawal (THA); Stefano Mocciola (THA) | 4 | 2
Abdulrahman Al-Awadhi (KUW); Hussain Shams (KUW) | 4 | 3
2 | Farsad Shahi (IRI); Amir Mohammad Jamshidi (IRI) | 6 | 6

Quarterfinals
3 | Christian Didier Chin (MAS); Aidan Yunus (MAS) | 6 | 3 | 6
Jason Lapidus (PHI); Argil Lance Cañizares (PHI) | 3 | 6 | 3
5 | Kazuki Tomita (JPN); Nasa Hatakeyama (JPN) | 1 | 6^{5}
2 | Farsad Shahi (IRI); Amir Mohammad Jamshidi (IRI) | 6 | 7^{7}

Semifinals
3 | Christian Didier Chin (MAS); Aidan Yunus (MAS) | 1 | 6 | 6
2 | Farsad Shahi (IRI); Amir Mohammad Jamshidi (IRI) | 6 | 4 | 1
