= Marko Miladinović =

Serbian tennis player

Marko Miladinović Марко Миладиновић
- Country (sports): Serbia
- Residence: Belgrade, Serbia
- Born: 7 December 2000 (age 24) Belgrade, Serbia, FR Yugoslavia
- Height: 1.80 m (5 ft 11 in)
- Plays: Right-handed (two-handed backhand)
- Coach: Aleksandar Trifunović; Miki Janković (2017–18); Boris Pašanski (2018–2019); Denis Bejtulahi(2019) Ilija Bozoljac(2020-
- Prize money: $39,680

Singles
- Career record: 0–0 (at ATP Tour level, Grand Slam level, and in Davis Cup)
- Career titles: 0
- Highest ranking: No. 451 (13 January 2020)
- Current ranking: No. 1039 (3 November 2025)

Grand Slam singles results
- Australian Open Junior: SF (2018)
- French Open Junior: 1R (2017, 2018)
- Wimbledon Junior: 2R (2017)
- US Open Junior: 2R (2017)

Doubles
- Career record: 0–0 (at ATP Tour level, Grand Slam level, and in Davis Cup)
- Career titles: 0
- Highest ranking: No. 1312 (1 November 2021)

Grand Slam doubles results
- Australian Open Junior: 1R (2018)
- French Open Junior: 1R (2017)
- Wimbledon Junior: 1R (2017)
- US Open Junior: 1R (2017)
- Last updated on: 29 August 2022.

Marko Miladinović (Serbian Cyrillic: Марко Миладиновић, pronounced [mâːrko miladǐːnoʋitɕ]; born 7 December 2000) is a Serbian tennis player.

Miladinović has a career high ATP singles ranking of world No. 451 achieved on 13 January 2020.

Miladinović has a career high ITF junior combined ranking of world No. 2 achieved on 1 January 2018.

== ATP Challenger Tour and ITF Futures finals ==
=== Singles: 7 (3–4) ===
Legend
ATP Challenger Tour (0–0)
ITF Futures (3–4)

Result	Date	Category	Tournament	Surface	Opponent	Score
Runner-up	1 April 2018	Futures	Turkey F12, Antalya	Clay	(Turkey) Cem Ilkel	6–2, 2–6, 2–6
Winner	26 August 2018	Futures	Serbia F3, Novi Sad	Clay	(Tunisia) Moez Echargui	6–3, 6–4
Runner-up	2 September 2018	Futures	Serbia F4, Subotica	Clay	(Latvia) Mārtiņš Podžus	2–6, 6–7^{(6–8)}
Winner	7 July 2019	Futures	Serbia M15, Belgrade	Clay	(Hungary) Fábián Marozsán	6–3, 6–3
Runner-up	11 August 2019	Futures	Serbia M15, Novi Sad	Clay	(Hungary) Péter Nagy	6–7^{(4–7)}, 4–6
Winner	18 August 2019	Futures	Serbia M15, Novi Sad	Clay	(Israel) Yshei Oliel	2–6, 6–1, 6–2
Runner-up	22 December 2019	Futures	Turkey M15, Antalya	Clay	(Romania) Alexandru Jecan	3–6, 3–6

=== Doubles: 1 (1–0) ===
Legend
ATP Challenger Tour (0–0)
ITF Futures (1–0)

Result	Date	Category	Tournament	Surface	Partner	Opponents	Score
Winner	31 October 2020	Futures	Sharm El Sheikh, Egypt	Hard	(Serbia) Miljan Zekić	(Italy) Alessandro Bega (Cyprus) Petros Chrysochos	6–4, 6–3
