= 2018 Australian Open – Boys' singles =

Boys' singles
- 2018 Australian Open

Final
- Champion: (United States) Sebastian Korda
- Runner-up: (Chinese Taipei) Tseng Chun-hsin
- Score: 7–6^{(8–6)}, 6–4

Events
Singles	men	women		boys	girls
Doubles	men	women	mixed	boys	girls
WC Singles	men	women	quad
WC Doubles	men	women	quad
Legends	men	women	mixed
- Australian Open

Sebastian Korda, the son of 1998 men's singles champion Petr Korda, won the boys' singles tennis title at the 2018 Australian Open, defeating Tseng Chun-hsin in the final, 7–6^{(8–6)}, 6–4.

Zsombor Piros was the defending champion, but was no longer eligible to participate in junior events. He received a wildcard into the men's singles qualifying competition, where he lost to Bjorn Fratangelo in the second round.

== Seeds ==
1. (Russia) Timofey Skatov (quarterfinals)
2. (Serbia) Marko Miladinović (semifinals)
3. (Argentina) Sebastián Báez (second round)
4. (South Korea) Park Ui-sung (first round)
5. (France) Hugo Gaston (quarterfinals)
6. (Chinese Taipei) Tseng Chun-hsin (final)
7. (United States) Sebastian Korda (champion)
8. (Colombia) Nicolás Mejía (first round)
9. (Brazil) Thiago Seyboth Wild (second round)
10. (Argentina) Juan Manuel Cerúndolo (first round)
11. (Argentina) Thiago Agustín Tirante (first round)
12. (Russia) Alexey Zakharov (third round, retired)
13. (United States) Andrew Fenty (first round)
14. (Czech Republic) Ondřej Štyler (third round)
15. (Japan) Naoki Tajima (first round)
16. (Czech Republic) Tomáš Macháč (first round)

== Draw ==
Key

- Q = Qualifier
- WC = Wild card
- LL = Lucky loser
- Alt = Alternate
- ITF = ITF entry
- PR = Protected ranking
- SR = Special ranking
- SE = Special exempt
- JE = Junior exempt
- JR = Junior Accelerator Programme entrant
- CO = College Accelerator Programme entrant
- NG = Next Gen Accelerator Program entrant
- w/o = Walkover
- r = Retired
- d = Defaulted

=== Finals ===
Quarterfinals
1	(Russia) Timofey Skatov	6	3	2
6	(Chinese Taipei) Tseng Chun-hsin	2	6	6
(United Kingdom) Aidan McHugh	6	6
WC	(Australia) Rinky Hijikata	4	2
7	(United States) Sebastian Korda	6	6
(Chinese Taipei) Ray Ho	2	3
5	(France) Hugo Gaston	6	3	5
2	(Serbia) Marko Miladinović	4	6	7

Semifinals
6	(Chinese Taipei) Tseng Chun-hsin	6	5	6
(United Kingdom) Aidan McHugh	3	7	4
7	(United States) Sebastian Korda	7	5	6
2	(Serbia) Marko Miladinović	5	7	4

Final
6	(Chinese Taipei) Tseng Chun-hsin	6^{6}	4
7	(United States) Sebastian Korda	7^{8}	6

=== Top half ===
==== Section 1 ====
First round
1	(Russia) Timofey Skatov	6	6
(China) Mo Yecong	2	3
(France) Titouan Droguet	6	2	3
WC	(Australia) Stefan Storch	3	6	6
(United Kingdom) Jack Draper	3	4
(Czech Republic) Dalibor Svrčina	6	6
(Turkey) Yankı Erel	7^{7}	2	6
13	(United States) Andrew Fenty	6^{2}	6	3
11	(Argentina) Thiago Agustín Tirante	6	6^{4}	0
Q	(Uzbekistan) Sergey Fomin	4	7^{7}	6
LL	(Netherlands) Lodewijk Weststrate	6^{3}	1
(Brazil) Igor Gimenez	7^{7}	6
(Japan) Taisei Ichikawa	7	6^{6}	6
(Poland) Daniel Michalski	5	7^{8}	3
Q	(Croatia) Duje Ajduković	0	2
6	(Chinese Taipei) Tseng Chun-hsin	6	6

Second round
1	(Russia) T Skatov	6	6
WC	(Australia) S Storch	1	2
(Czech Republic) D Svrčina	2	0
(Turkey) Y Erel	6	6
Q	(Uzbekistan) S Fomin	1	7	3
(Brazil) I Gimenez	6	5	6
(Japan) T Ichikawa	7^{7}	3	0
6	(Chinese Taipei) C-h Tseng	6^{4}	6	6

Third round
1	(Russia) T Skatov	0	7	6
(Turkey) Y Erel	6	5	3
(Brazil) I Gimenez	2	6^{5}
6	(Chinese Taipei) C-h Tseng	6	7^{7}

Quarterfinals
1	(Russia) T Skatov	6	3	2
6	(Chinese Taipei) C-h Tseng	2	6	6

==== Section 2 ====
First round
4	(South Korea) Park Ui-sung	6^{4}	4
Q	(France) Jaimee Floyd Angele	7^{7}	6
(United Kingdom) Aidan McHugh	6	7^{7}
(Romania) Filip Cristian Jianu	4	6^{3}
WC	(Australia) Alexander Crnokrak	6	6
(United States) Sangeet Sridhar	3	1
Q	(Italy) Giulio Zeppieri	2	6^{6}
14	(Czech Republic) Ondřej Štyler	6	7^{8}
10	(Argentina) Juan Manuel Cerúndolo	2	2
(United States) Drew Baird	6	6
Q	(Netherlands) Jesper de Jong	6	6
WC	(China) Xiao Linang	1	3
(Czech Republic) Jonáš Forejtek	5	1
WC	(Australia) Rinky Hijikata	7	6
(Brazil) Matheus Pucinelli de Almeida	7	7^{9}
8	(Colombia) Nicolás Mejía	5	6^{7}

Second round
Q	(France) JF Angele	2	6	6^{5}
(United Kingdom) A McHugh	6	3	7^{7}
WC	(Australia) A Crnokrak	3	7^{7}	3
14	(Czech Republic) O Štyler	6	6^{3}	6
(United States) D Baird	3	6	7^{8}
Q	(Netherlands) J de Jong	6	4	6^{6}
WC	(Australia) R Hijikata	4	6	6
(Brazil) M Pucinelli de Almeida	6	4	4

Third round
(United Kingdom) A McHugh	7^{7}	6
14	(Czech Republic) O Štyler	6^{1}	3
(United States) D Baird	4	3
WC	(Australia) R Hijikata	6	6

Quarterfinals
(United Kingdom) A McHugh	6	6
WC	(Australia) R Hijikata	4	2

=== Bottom half ===
==== Section 3 ====
First round
7	(United States) Sebastian Korda	7	6
(France) Clément Tabur	5	3
WC	(Australia) Ken Cavrak	3	3
(Bulgaria) Adrian Andreev	6	6
Q	(South Africa) Philip Henning	7^{7}	7
(United Kingdom) George Loffhagen	6^{5}	5
(Australia) Dane Sweeny	5	5
9	(Brazil) Thiago Seyboth Wild	7	7
15	(Japan) Naoki Tajima	3	4
(Poland) Wojciech Marek	6	6
(Malaysia) Christian Didier Chin	3	6	7^{7}
(Australia) Thomas Bosancic	6	0	6^{3}
(Czech Republic) Andrew Paulson	5	3
(Chinese Taipei) Ray Ho	7	6
(Croatia) Admir Kalender	7^{8}	3	3
3	(Argentina) Sebastián Báez	6^{6}	6	6

Second round
7	(United States) S Korda	6	6
(Bulgaria) A Andreev	2	1
Q	(South Africa) P Henning	6	6
9	(Brazil) T Seyboth Wild	4	4
(Poland) W Marek	7	6
(Malaysia) CD Chin	5	2
(Chinese Taipei) R Ho	6	3	6
3	(Argentina) S Báez	3	6	4

Third round
7	(United States) S Korda	4	6	6
Q	(South Africa) P Henning	6	1	4
(Poland) W Marek	1	6	5
(Chinese Taipei) R Ho	6	3	7

Quarterfinals
7	(United States) S Korda	6	6
(Chinese Taipei) R Ho	2	3

==== Section 4 ====
First round
5	(France) Hugo Gaston	6	6
(India) Siddhant Banthia	2	0
(South Korea) Jeong Yeong-seok	6	5^{r}
Q	(United States) Jaycer Lyeons	3	5
(Dominican Republic) Nick Hardt	6	6
WC	(Australia) Chen Dong	3	3
Q	(Switzerland) Damien Wenger	5	6	0
12	(Russia) Alexey Zakharov	7	4	6
16	(Czech Republic) Tomáš Macháč	3	6^{5}
(Germany) Rudolf Molleker	6	7^{7}
(China) Mu Tao	6	6
WC	(Australia) Tristan Schoolkate	4	2
(United States) Tristan Boyer	6	6
(Italy) Lorenzo Musetti	3	1
(Brazil) João Lucas Reis da Silva	3	7^{11}	3
2	(Serbia) Marko Miladinović	6	6^{9}	6

Second round
5	(France) H Gaston	6	7^{7}
Q	(United States) J Lyeons	3	6^{4}
(Dominican Republic) N Hardt	3	4
12	(Russia) A Zakharov	6	6
(Germany) R Molleker	6^{3}	7^{14}	6
(China) T Mu	7^{7}	6^{12}	3
(United States) T Boyer	6	1	4
2	(Serbia) M Miladinović	2	6	6

Third round
5	(France) H Gaston	7	1
12	(Russia) A Zakharov	5	0^{r}
(Germany) R Molleker	3	4
2	(Serbia) M Miladinović	6	6

Quarterfinals
5	(France) H Gaston	6	3	5
2	(Serbia) M Miladinović	4	6	7

== Qualifying ==
=== Seeds ===
1. (Switzerland) Damien Wenger (qualified)
2. (Netherlands) Jesper de Jong (qualified)
3. (United States) Brian Shi (first round)
4. (South Korea) Han Seon-yong (qualifying competition)
5. (South Africa) Philip Henning (qualified)
6. (Ukraine) Oleksii Krutykh (qualifying competition)
7. (Croatia) Duje Ajduković (qualified)
8. (Switzerland) Aaron Schmid (first round)
9. (Japan) Seita Watanabe (first round)
10. (France) Jaimee Floyd Angele (qualified)
11. (Italy) Giulio Zeppieri (qualified)
12. (Spain) Alberto Colás Sánchez (qualifying competition)
13. (Netherlands) Lodewijk Weststrate (qualifying competition; lucky loser)
14. (Uzbekistan) Sergey Fomin (qualified)
15. (United States) Jaycer Lyeons (qualified)
16. (United Kingdom) Emile Hudd (qualifying competition)

=== Qualifiers ===
1. (Switzerland) Damien Wenger
2. (Netherlands) Jesper de Jong
3. (France) Jaimee Floyd Angele
4. (Uzbekistan) Sergey Fomin
5. (South Africa) Philip Henning
6. (Italy) Giulio Zeppieri
7. (Croatia) Duje Ajduković
8. (United States) Jaycer Lyeons

=== Lucky losers ===
1. (Netherlands) Lodewijk Weststrate

=== Draw ===
==== First qualifier ====
First round
1	(Switzerland) Damien Wenger	6	6
WC	(Australia) Will Hann	4	4
(New Zealand) Macsen Sisam	6	6
9	(Japan) Seita Watanabe	4	3

Qualifying competition
1	(Switzerland) Damien Wenger	7^{7}	7
(New Zealand) Macsen Sisam	6^{5}	5

==== Second qualifier ====
First round
2	(Netherlands) Jesper de Jong	6	6
(United States) William Woodall	2	3
WC	(Australia) Joshua Spaull	0	4
16	(United Kingdom) Emile Hudd	6	6

Qualifying competition
2	(Netherlands) Jesper de Jong	6	6
16	(United Kingdom) Emile Hudd	0	4

==== Third qualifier ====
First round
3	(United States) Brian Shi	3	3
(Germany) Henri Squire	6	6
WC	(Australia) Tai Sach	2	3
10	(France) Jaimee Floyd Angele	6	6

Qualifying competition
(Germany) Henri Squire	1	2
10	(France) Jaimee Floyd Angele	6	6

==== Fourth qualifier ====
First round
4	(South Korea) Han Seon-yong	6	6
(Australia) Campbell Salmon	4	2
(Japan) Keisuke Saitoh	4	6	3
14	(Uzbekistan) Sergey Fomin	6	4	6

Qualifying competition
4	(South Korea) Han Seon-yong	1	6	3
14	(Uzbekistan) Sergey Fomin	6	3	6

==== Fifth qualifier ====
First round
5	(South Africa) Philip Henning	7	6
WC	(Australia) Jayden Court	5	4
(Germany) Leopold Zima	6	1	3
12	(Spain) Alberto Colás Sánchez	2	6	6

Qualifying competition
5	(South Africa) Philip Henning	6	6
12	(Spain) Alberto Colás Sánchez	4	3

==== Sixth qualifier ====
First round
6	(Ukraine) Oleksii Krutykh	6	4	7^{7}
WC	(Australia) Patrick Harper	1	6	6^{5}
(Japan) Ryuya Ata	2	1
11	(Italy) Giulio Zeppieri	6	6

Qualifying competition
6	(Ukraine) Oleksii Krutykh	4	2
11	(Italy) Giulio Zeppieri	6	6

==== Seventh qualifier ====
First round
7	(Croatia) Duje Ajduković	2	6	6
(Hong Kong) Ng Ki-lung	6	1	4
WC	(Australia) Mason Naumovski	3	1
13	(Netherlands) Lodewijk Weststrate	6	6

Qualifying competition
7	(Croatia) Duje Ajduković	6	7
13	(Netherlands) Lodewijk Weststrate	3	5

==== Eighth qualifier ====
First round
8	(Switzerland) Aaron Schmid	6	4	1
(Japan) Hikaru Shiraishi	2	6	6
(Sweden) Erik Grevelius	6	1	1
15	(United States) Jaycer Lyeons	3	6	6

Qualifying competition
(Japan) Hikaru Shiraishi	7	5	0^{r}
15	(United States) Jaycer Lyeons	5	7	3
