= 2018 Australian Open – Men's doubles =

Tennis tournament

Men's doubles
- 2018 Australian Open

Final
- Champions: (Austria) Oliver Marach (Croatia) Mate Pavić
- Runners-up: (Colombia) Juan Sebastián Cabal (Colombia) Robert Farah
- Score: 6–4, 6–4

Details
- Draw: 64
- Seeds: 16

Events
Singles	men	women		boys	girls
Doubles	men	women	mixed	boys	girls
WC Singles	men	women	quad
WC Doubles	men	women	quad
Legends	men	women	mixed
- Australian Open

Henri Kontinen and John Peers were the defending champions, but lost in the second round to Radu Albot and Chung Hyeon.

Oliver Marach and Mate Pavić won the title, defeating Juan Sebastián Cabal and Robert Farah in the final, 6–4, 6–4.

== Seeds ==
1. (Poland) Łukasz Kubot / (Brazil) Marcelo Melo (quarterfinals)
2. (Finland) Henri Kontinen / (Australia) John Peers (second round)
3. (Netherlands) Jean-Julien Rojer / (Romania) Horia Tecău (second round)
4. (France) Pierre-Hugues Herbert / (France) Nicolas Mahut (second round)
5. (United Kingdom) Jamie Murray / (Brazil) Bruno Soares (second round)
6. (United States) Bob Bryan / (United States) Mike Bryan (semifinals)
7. (Austria) Oliver Marach / (Croatia) Mate Pavić (champions)
8. (South Africa) Raven Klaasen / (New Zealand) Michael Venus (first round)

9. (Spain) Feliciano López / (Spain) Marc López (second round)
10. (India) Rohan Bopanna / (France) Édouard Roger-Vasselin (third round)
11. (Colombia) Juan Sebastián Cabal / (Colombia) Robert Farah (final)
12. (Uruguay) Pablo Cuevas / (Argentina) Horacio Zeballos (first round)
13. (Mexico) Santiago González / (Chile) Julio Peralta (first round)
14. (Croatia) Ivan Dodig / (Spain) Fernando Verdasco (first round)
15. (Poland) Marcin Matkowski / (Pakistan) Aisam-ul-Haq Qureshi (quarterfinals)
16. (United States) Rajeev Ram / (India) Divij Sharan (third round)

Click on the seed number of a player to go to their draw section.

== Draw ==
Key

- Q = Qualifier
- WC = Wild card
- LL = Lucky loser
- Alt = Alternate
- ITF = ITF entry
- PR = Protected ranking
- SR = Special ranking
- SE = Special exempt
- JE = Junior exempt
- JR = Junior Accelerator Programme entrant
- CO = College Accelerator Programme entrant
- NG = Next Gen Accelerator Program entrant
- w/o = Walkover
- r = Retired
- d = Defaulted

=== Finals ===
Quarterfinals
1	(Poland) Łukasz Kubot (Brazil) Marcelo Melo	4	7^{7}	6^{5}
(Japan) Ben McLachlan (Germany) Jan-Lennard Struff	6	6^{4}	7^{7}
(New Zealand) Marcus Daniell (United Kingdom) Dominic Inglot	4	7^{12}	6^{5}
7	(Austria) Oliver Marach (Croatia) Mate Pavić	6	6^{10}	7^{7}
11	(Colombia) Juan Sebastián Cabal (Colombia) Robert Farah	6	7
WC	(Australia) Sam Groth (Australia) Lleyton Hewitt	4	5
6	(United States) Bob Bryan (United States) Mike Bryan	6	6
15	(Poland) Marcin Matkowski (Pakistan) Aisam-ul-Haq Qureshi	1	4

Semifinals
(Japan) Ben McLachlan (Germany) Jan-Lennard Struff	6	5	6^{4}
7	(Austria) Oliver Marach (Croatia) Mate Pavić	4	7	7^{7}
11	(Colombia) Juan Sebastián Cabal (Colombia) Robert Farah	7^{7}	7
6	(United States) Bob Bryan (United States) Mike Bryan	6^{1}	5

Final
7	(Austria) Oliver Marach (Croatia) Mate Pavić	6	6
11	(Colombia) Juan Sebastián Cabal (Colombia) Robert Farah	4	4

=== Top half ===
==== Section 1 ====
First round
1	(Poland) Ł Kubot (Brazil) M Melo	6	6
(Italy) P Lorenzi (Germany) M Zverev	2	2
(Russia) M Elgin (Russia) A Rublev	3	4
WC	(Australia) M Purcell (Australia) L Saville	6	6
(Italy) F Fognini (Spain) M Granollers	6^{6}	6	6
WC	(Australia) A Bolt (Australia) B Mousley	7^{8}	3	2
(Romania) M Copil (Serbia) V Troicki	6^{5}	4
16	(United States) R Ram (India) D Sharan	7^{7}	6
9	(Spain) F López (Spain) M López	6	6
(Romania) F Mergea (Serbia) N Zimonjić	2	4
(Japan) B McLachlan (Germany) J-L Struff	6	6
WC	(Australia) T Kokkinakis (Australia) J Thompson	4	3
(Spain) P Carreño Busta (Spain) G García López	3	6	6
(Netherlands) R Haase (Netherlands) M Middelkoop	6	3	2
(United States) S Lipsky (Spain) D Marrero	7^{16}	7^{7}
8	(South Africa) R Klaasen (New Zealand) M Venus	6^{14}	6^{4}

Second round
1	(Poland) Ł Kubot (Brazil) M Melo	6	7^{7}
WC	(Australia) M Purcell (Australia) L Saville	3	6^{2}
(Italy) F Fognini (Spain) M Granollers	6	6^{4}	2
16	(United States) R Ram (India) D Sharan	4	7^{7}	6
9	(Spain) F López (Spain) M López	6	3	2
(Japan) B McLachlan (Germany) J-L Struff	4	6	6
(Spain) P Carreño Busta (Spain) G García López	3	7^{7}	6
(United States) S Lipsky (Spain) D Marrero	6	6^{5}	3

Third round
1	(Poland) Ł Kubot (Brazil) M Melo	3	7^{7}	6
16	(United States) R Ram (India) D Sharan	6	6^{4}	4
(Japan) B McLachlan (Germany) J-L Struff	6	7^{7}
(Spain) P Carreño Busta (Spain) G García López	4	6^{5}

Quarterfinals
1	(Poland) Ł Kubot (Brazil) M Melo	4	7^{7}	6^{5}
(Japan) B McLachlan (Germany) J-L Struff	6	6^{4}	7^{7}

==== Section 2 ====
First round
4	(France) P-H Herbert (France) N Mahut	7^{7}	7
WC	(Australia) M Ebden (Australia) J Millman	6^{4}	5
(Argentina) G Pella (Argentina) D Schwartzman	6	3	6^{3}
(Chile) H Podlipnik-Castillo (Belarus) A Vasilevski	3	6	7^{7}
(Canada) A Shamasdin (United Kingdom) N Skupski	4	6	3
(New Zealand) M Daniell (United Kingdom) D Inglot	6	2	6
(France) H Nys (France) B Paire	6	0	6
13	(Mexico) S González (Chile) J Peralta	4	6	2
10	(India) R Bopanna (France) É Roger-Vasselin	6	7^{7}
(United States) R Harrison (Canada) V Pospisil	2	6^{5}
Alt	(United States) J Cerretani (United Kingdom) K Skupski	6^{8}	5
(Argentina) L Mayer (Portugal) J Sousa	7^{10}	7
(Germany) P Gojowczyk (Germany) F Mayer	2	1
(Netherlands) W Koolhof (New Zealand) A Sitak	6	6
(Argentina) F Delbonis (Dominican Republic) V Estrella Burgos	1	4
7	(Austria) O Marach (Croatia) M Pavić	6	6

Second round
4	(France) P-H Herbert (France) N Mahut	6^{1}	7	6^{6}
(Chile) H Podlipnik-Castillo (Belarus) A Vasilevski	7^{7}	5	7^{8}
(New Zealand) M Daniell (United Kingdom) D Inglot	6	6
(France) H Nys (France) B Paire	4	2
10	(India) R Bopanna (France) É Roger-Vasselin	6	7^{7}
(Argentina) L Mayer (Portugal) J Sousa	2	6^{3}
(Netherlands) W Koolhof (New Zealand) A Sitak	7^{7}	4	4
7	(Austria) O Marach (Croatia) M Pavić	6^{5}	6	6

Third round
(Chile) H Podlipnik-Castillo (Belarus) A Vasilevski	4	3
(New Zealand) M Daniell (United Kingdom) D Inglot	6	6
10	(India) R Bopanna (France) É Roger-Vasselin	4	7^{7}	3
7	(Austria) O Marach (Croatia) M Pavić	6	6^{5}	6

Quarterfinals
(New Zealand) M Daniell (United Kingdom) D Inglot	4	7^{12}	6^{5}
7	(Austria) O Marach (Croatia) M Pavić	6	6^{10}	7^{7}

=== Bottom half ===
==== Section 3 ====
First round
5	(United Kingdom) J Murray (Brazil) B Soares	5	6	6
(United States) F Tiafoe (United States) D Young	7	4	4
(India) L Paes (India) P Raja	6	6
PR	(Georgia (country)) N Basilashvili (Austria) A Haider-Maurer	2	3
(France) J Benneteau (France) J Eysseric	3	0
(Croatia) N Mektić (Austria) A Peya	6	6
(Australia) M Polmans (Australia) A Whittington	6^{5}	6^{4}
11	(Colombia) JS Cabal (Colombia) R Farah	7^{7}	7^{7}
14	(Croatia) I Dodig (Spain) F Verdasco	4	3
(United States) S Johnson (United States) S Querrey	6	6
PR	(Spain) P Andújar (Spain) A Ramos Viñolas	6	6
WC	(Thailand) Sa Ratiwatana (Thailand) So Ratiwatana	4	4
(Uzbekistan) D Istomin (Kazakhstan) M Kukushkin	3	3
WC	(Australia) S Groth (Australia) L Hewitt	6	6
(Argentina) G Durán (Argentina) A Molteni	4	3
3	(Netherlands) J-J Rojer (Romania) H Tecău	6	6

Second round
5	(United Kingdom) J Murray (Brazil) B Soares	6^{3}	7	6^{6}
(India) L Paes (India) P Raja	7^{7}	5	7^{8}
(Croatia) N Mektić (Austria) A Peya	6^{5}	5
11	(Colombia) JS Cabal (Colombia) R Farah	7^{7}	7
(United States) S Johnson (United States) S Querrey	4	4
PR	(Spain) P Andújar (Spain) A Ramos Viñolas	6	6
WC	(Australia) S Groth (Australia) L Hewitt	7^{7}	4	7
3	(Netherlands) J-J Rojer (Romania) H Tecău	6^{2}	6	5

Third round
(India) L Paes (India) P Raja	1	2
11	(Colombia) JS Cabal (Colombia) R Farah	6	6
PR	(Spain) P Andújar (Spain) A Ramos Viñolas	3^{r}
WC	(Australia) S Groth (Australia) L Hewitt	3

Quarterfinals
11	(Colombia) JS Cabal (Colombia) R Farah	6	7
WC	(Australia) S Groth (Australia) L Hewitt	4	5

==== Section 4 ====
First round
6	(United States) B Bryan (United States) M Bryan	5	7	6
PR/Alt	(Hungary) M Fucsovics (Japan) Y Nishioka	7	5	1
(Italy) T Fabbiano (Israel) D Sela	6^{5}	6	6^{4}
(Belarus) M Mirnyi (Austria) P Oswald	7^{7}	3	7^{7}
(United States) N Monroe (Australia) J-P Smith	4	7	6^{4}
(Australia) N Kyrgios (Australia) M Reid	6	5	7^{7}
(France) J Chardy (France) F Martin	6	6^{3}	7^{7}
12	(Uruguay) P Cuevas (Argentina) H Zeballos	3	7^{7}	6^{5}
15	(Poland) M Matkowski (Pakistan) A-u-H Qureshi	7^{8}	6
(Brazil) M Demoliner (Philippines) T Huey	6^{6}	4
(Czech Republic) R Jebavý (Czech Republic) J Veselý	5	5
(Sweden) R Lindstedt (Croatia) F Škugor	7	7
(Moldova) R Albot (South Korea) H Chung	7^{7}	6
(Israel) J Erlich (Canada) D Nestor	6^{4}	3
(Bosnia and Herzegovina) D Džumhur (Serbia) D Lajović	6	2	2
2	(Finland) H Kontinen (Australia) J Peers	4	6	6

Second round
6	(United States) B Bryan (United States) M Bryan	6^{5}	6	6
(Belarus) M Mirnyi (Austria) P Oswald	7^{7}	4	4
(Australia) N Kyrgios (Australia) M Reid
(France) J Chardy (France) F Martin	w/o
15	(Poland) M Matkowski (Pakistan) A-u-H Qureshi	7^{7}	6
(Sweden) R Lindstedt (Croatia) F Škugor	6^{4}	4
(Moldova) R Albot (South Korea) H Chung	6	7^{7}
2	(Finland) H Kontinen (Australia) J Peers	4	6^{5}

Third round
6	(United States) B Bryan (United States) M Bryan	6^{2}	7^{7}	6
(France) J Chardy (France) F Martin	7^{7}	6^{5}	3
15	(Poland) M Matkowski (Pakistan) A-u-H Qureshi	w/o
(Moldova) R Albot (South Korea) H Chung

Quarterfinals
6	(United States) B Bryan (United States) M Bryan	6	6
15	(Poland) M Matkowski (Pakistan) A-u-H Qureshi	1	4
