= 2018 Australian Open – Wheelchair men's doubles =

Wheelchair men's doubles
- 2018 Australian Open

Final
- Champions: (France) Stéphane Houdet (France) Nicolas Peifer
- Runners-up: (United Kingdom) Alfie Hewett (United Kingdom) Gordon Reid
- Score: 6–4, 6–2

Events
Singles	men	women		boys	girls
Doubles	men	women	mixed	boys	girls
WC Singles	men	women	quad
WC Doubles	men	women	quad
Legends	men	women	mixed
← 2017 ·	Australian Open	· 2019 →

Stéphane Houdet and Nicolas Peifer defeated the defending champion Gordon Reid and his partner Alfie Hewett in the final, 6–4, 6–2 to win the men's doubles wheelchair tennis title at the 2018 Australian Open.

Joachim Gérard and Reid were the defending champions, but Gérard did not participate.

== Seeds ==
1. (United Kingdom) Alfie Hewett / (United Kingdom) Gordon Reid (final)
2. (France) Stéphane Houdet / (France) Nicolas Peifer (champions)

== Draw ==
=== Key ===
- Q = Qualifier
- WC = Wild card
- LL = Lucky loser
- Alt = Alternate
- ITF = ITF entry
- PR = Protected ranking
- SR = Special ranking
- SE = Special exempt
- JE = Junior exempt
- JR = Junior Accelerator Programme entrant
- CO = College Accelerator Programme entrant
- NG = Next Gen Accelerator Program entrant
- w/o = Walkover
- r = Retired
- d = Defaulted

=== Draw ===
First round
1	(United Kingdom) Alfie Hewett (United Kingdom) Gordon Reid	6	4	[10]
(Argentina) Gustavo Fernández (Japan) Shingo Kunieda	1	6	[6]
(Australia) Adam Kellerman (Sweden) Stefan Olsson	2	2
2	(France) Stéphane Houdet (France) Nicolas Peifer	6	6

Final
1	(United Kingdom) Alfie Hewett (United Kingdom) Gordon Reid	4	2
2	(France) Stéphane Houdet (France) Nicolas Peifer	6	6
