= 2018 Australian Open – Wheelchair men's singles =

Wheelchair men's singles
- 2018 Australian Open

Final
- Champion: (Japan) Shingo Kunieda
- Runner-up: (France) Stéphane Houdet
- Score: 4–6, 6–1, 7–6^{(7–3)}

Events
Singles	men	women		boys	girls
Doubles	men	women	mixed	boys	girls
WC Singles	men	women	quad
WC Doubles	men	women	quad
Legends	men	women	mixed
- Australian Open

Shingo Kunieda defeated Stéphane Houdet in the final, 4–6, 6–1, 7–6^{(7–3)} to win the men's singles wheelchair tennis title at the 2018 Australian Open. It was his ninth Australian Open singles title and 21st major singles title overall, and his first major championship in over two years. This was the sixth Australian Open final between Kunieda and Houdet, with Kunieda winning all six meetings, and dropping just 2 sets.

In the quarterfinals, Kunieda defeated Gordon Reid, the only man to beat Kunieda at the Australian Open, in 2016 (Kunieda skipped the 2017 tournament).

Gustavo Fernández was the defending champion, but was defeated Nicolas Peifer in the quarterfinals in a rematch of the previous year's final.

== Seeds ==
1. (Argentina) Gustavo Fernández (first round)
2. (United Kingdom) Alfie Hewett (first round)

== Draw ==
Key

- Q = Qualifier
- WC = Wild card
- LL = Lucky loser
- Alt = Alternate
- ITF = ITF entry
- PR = Protected ranking
- SR = Special ranking
- SE = Special exempt
- JE = Junior exempt
- JR = Junior Accelerator Programme entrant
- CO = College Accelerator Programme entrant
- NG = Next Gen Accelerator Program entrant
- w/o = Walkover
- r = Retired
- d = Defaulted

=== Draw ===
First round
1	(Argentina) Gustavo Fernández	6	3	2
(France) Nicolas Peifer	4	6	6
(France) Stéphane Houdet	6	6
WC	(Australia) Adam Kellerman	2	0
(United Kingdom) Gordon Reid	1	3
(Japan) Shingo Kunieda	6	6
(Sweden) Stefan Olsson	1	6	6
2	(United Kingdom) Alfie Hewett	6	3	4

Semifinals
(France) Nicolas Peifer	2	5
(France) Stéphane Houdet	6	7
(Japan) Shingo Kunieda	7^{8}	6
(Sweden) Stefan Olsson	6^{6}	2

Final
(France) Stéphane Houdet	6	1	6^{3}
(Japan) Shingo Kunieda	4	6	7^{7}
