= 2018 Australian Open – Mixed doubles =

Mixed doubles
- 2018 Australian Open

Final
- Champions: (Canada) Gabriela Dabrowski (Croatia) Mate Pavić
- Runners-up: (Hungary) Tímea Babos (India) Rohan Bopanna
- Score: 2–6, 6–4, [11–9]

Details
- Draw: 32
- Seeds: 8

Events
Singles	men	women		boys	girls
Doubles	men	women	mixed	boys	girls
WC Singles	men	women	quad
WC Doubles	men	women	quad
Legends	men	women	mixed
- Australian Open

Gabriela Dabrowski and Mate Pavić won the mixed doubles tennis title at the 2018 Australian Open, defeating Tímea Babos and Rohan Bopanna in the final, 2–6, 6–4, [11–9]. They saved a championship point in the third-set tiebreak.

Abigail Spears and Juan Sebastián Cabal were the defending champions, but lost in the quarterfinals to Babos and Bopanna.

== Seeds ==
1. (Chinese Taipei) Latisha Chan / (United Kingdom) Jamie Murray (second round)
2. (Australia) Casey Dellacqua / (Australia) John Peers (second round)
3. (Russia) Ekaterina Makarova / (Brazil) Bruno Soares (semifinals)
4. (Czech Republic) Květa Peschke / (Finland) Henri Kontinen (second round)
5. (Hungary) Tímea Babos / (India) Rohan Bopanna (final)
6. (Czech Republic) Andrea Sestini Hlaváčková / (France) Édouard Roger-Vasselin (quarterfinals)
7. (Chinese Taipei) Chan Hao-ching / (New Zealand) Michael Venus (second round)
8. (Canada) Gabriela Dabrowski / (Croatia) Mate Pavić (champions)

== Draw ==
Key

- Q = Qualifier
- WC = Wild card
- LL = Lucky loser
- Alt = Alternate
- ITF = ITF entry
- PR = Protected ranking
- SR = Special ranking
- SE = Special exempt
- JE = Junior exempt
- JR = Junior Accelerator Programme entrant
- CO = College Accelerator Programme entrant
- NG = Next Gen Accelerator Program entrant
- w/o = Walkover
- r = Retired
- d = Defaulted

=== Finals ===
Semifinals
(Spain) María José Martínez Sánchez (Brazil) Marcelo Demoliner	5	7	[6]
5	(Hungary) Tímea Babos (India) Rohan Bopanna	7	5	[10]
3	(Russia) Ekaterina Makarova (Brazil) Bruno Soares	1	4
8	(Canada) Gabriela Dabrowski (Croatia) Mate Pavić	6	6

Final
5	(Hungary) Tímea Babos (India) Rohan Bopanna	6	4	[9]
8	(Canada) Gabriela Dabrowski (Croatia) Mate Pavić	2	6	[11]

=== Top half ===
First round
1	(Chinese Taipei) L Chan (United Kingdom) J Murray	4	7	[11]
(Slovenia) A Klepač (United States) R Ram	6	5	[9]
(Germany) A-L Grönefeld (Colombia) R Farah	5	6	[4]
WC	(Australia) S Sanders (Australia) M Polmans	7	1	[10]
(Spain) MJ Martínez Sánchez (Brazil) M Demoliner	6	6
(United States) N Melichar (United States) N Monroe	2	3
(China) Z Yang (Pakistan) A-u-H Qureshi	3	4
7	(Chinese Taipei) H-c Chan (New Zealand) M Venus	6	6
4	(Czech Republic) K Peschke (Finland) H Kontinen	6	6
WC	(Australia) Z Hives (Australia) B Mousley	4	1
(United States) A Spears (Colombia) JS Cabal	6	6^{4}	[10]
(Czech Republic) R Voráčová (France) F Martin	4	7^{7}	[6]
PR	(United States) V King (Croatia) F Škugor	4	7	[10]
WC	(Australia) Ar Rodionova (Australia) J-P Smith	6	5	[7]
WC	(Australia) E Perez (Australia) A Whittington	2	4
5	(Hungary) T Babos (India) R Bopanna	6	6

Second round
1	(Chinese Taipei) L Chan (United Kingdom) J Murray	6^{8}	4
WC	(Australia) S Sanders (Australia) M Polmans	7^{10}	6
(Spain) MJ Martínez Sánchez (Brazil) M Demoliner	6	6
7	(Chinese Taipei) H-c Chan (New Zealand) M Venus	2	1
4	(Czech Republic) K Peschke (Finland) H Kontinen	6	3	[8]
(United States) A Spears (Colombia) JS Cabal	3	6	[10]
PR	(United States) V King (Croatia) F Škugor	4	4
5	(Hungary) T Babos (India) R Bopanna	6	6

Quarterfinals
WC	(Australia) S Sanders (Australia) M Polmans	5	4
(Spain) MJ Martínez Sánchez (Brazil) M Demoliner	7	6
(United States) A Spears (Colombia) JS Cabal	4	6^{5}
5	(Hungary) T Babos (India) R Bopanna	6	7^{7}

Semifinals
(Spain) MJ Martínez Sánchez (Brazil) M Demoliner	5	7	[6]
5	(Hungary) T Babos (India) R Bopanna	7	5	[10]

=== Bottom half ===
First round
6	(Czech Republic) A Sestini Hlaváčková (France) É Roger-Vasselin	6	6
(China) S Peng (Belarus) M Mirnyi	4	4
Alt	(Ukraine) O Savchuk (New Zealand) A Sitak	6^{5}	6	[7]
(Ukraine) N Kichenok (Spain) M Granollers	7^{7}	3	[10]
WC	(Australia) S Stosur (Australia) S Groth	6	7^{7}
WC	(Australia) P Hon (Australia) M Reid	3	6^{3}
(China) Y Xu (New Zealand) M Daniell	3	7	[2]
3	(Russia) E Makarova (Brazil) B Soares	6	5	[10]
8	(Canada) G Dabrowski (Croatia) M Pavić	6	7
WC	(Australia) L Cabrera (Australia) A Bolt	3	5
WC	(Australia) M Adamczak (Australia) M Ebden	5	4
(Netherlands) D Schuurs (Netherlands) J-J Rojer	7	6
(Poland) A Rosolska (Mexico) S González	2	5
(Sweden) J Larsson (Netherlands) M Middelkoop	6	7
PR	(Spain) A Parra Santonja (Spain) M López	4	4
2	(Australia) C Dellacqua (Australia) J Peers	6	6

Second round
6	(Czech Republic) A Sestini Hlaváčková (France) É Roger-Vasselin	6	7
(Ukraine) N Kichenok (Spain) M Granollers	2	5
WC	(Australia) S Stosur (Australia) S Groth	7^{7}	3	[9]
3	(Russia) E Makarova (Brazil) B Soares	6^{4}	6	[11]
8	(Canada) G Dabrowski (Croatia) M Pavić	6	6
(Netherlands) D Schuurs (Netherlands) J-J Rojer	1	3
(Sweden) J Larsson (Netherlands) M Middelkoop	6	7^{7}
2	(Australia) C Dellacqua (Australia) J Peers	3	6^{5}

Quarterfinals
6	(Czech Republic) A Sestini Hlaváčková (France) É Roger-Vasselin	2	6	[11]
3	(Russia) E Makarova (Brazil) B Soares	6	4	[13]
8	(Canada) G Dabrowski (Croatia) M Pavić	6	7^{7}
(Sweden) J Larsson (Netherlands) M Middelkoop	3	6^{0}

Semifinals
3	(Russia) E Makarova (Brazil) B Soares	1	4
8	(Canada) G Dabrowski (Croatia) M Pavić	6	6
