= 2018 Australian Open – Wheelchair quad singles =

Wheelchair quad singles
- 2018 Australian Open

Final
- Champion: (Australia) Dylan Alcott
- Runner-up: (United States) David Wagner
- Score: 7–6^{(7–1)}, 6–1

Events
Singles	men	women		boys	girls
Doubles	men	women	mixed	boys	girls
WC Singles	men	women	quad
WC Doubles	men	women	quad
Legends	men	women	mixed
- Australian Open

Three-time defending champion Dylan Alcott defeated David Wagner in the final, 7–6^{(7–1)}, 6–1 to win the quad singles wheelchair tennis title at the 2018 Australian Open.

== Seeds ==
1. (United States) David Wagner (final)
2. (United Kingdom) Andrew Lapthorne (round robin)

== Draw ==
Key

- Q = Qualifier
- WC = Wild card
- LL = Lucky loser
- Alt = Alternate
- ITF = ITF entry
- PR = Protected ranking
- SR = Special ranking
- SE = Special exempt
- JE = Junior exempt
- JR = Junior Accelerator Programme entrant
- CO = College Accelerator Programme entrant
- NG = Next Gen Accelerator Program entrant
- w/o = Walkover
- r = Retired
- d = Defaulted

=== Final ===
Final
1	(United States) David Wagner	6^{1}	1
	(Australia) Dylan Alcott	7^{7}	6

=== Round robin ===
		(United States) Wagner	(Australia) Alcott	(Australia) Davidson	(United Kingdom) Lapthorne	RR; W–L	Set; W–L	Game; W–L	Standings
1	(United States) David Wagner		6–4, 6–7^{(4–7)}, 6–4	6–3, 6–2	w/o	3–0	4–1	30–20	1
	(Australia) Dylan Alcott	4–6, 7–6^{(7–4)}, 4–6		6–2, 6–0	6–1, 6–0	2–1	5–2	39–21	2
WC	(Australia) Heath Davidson	3–6, 2–6	2–6, 0–6		6–2, 6–1	1–2	2–4	19–27	3
2	(United Kingdom) Andrew Lapthorne	w/d	1–6, 0–6	2–6, 1–6		0–3	0–4	4–24	4
