= 2018 Australian Open – Wheelchair women's doubles =

Wheelchair women's doubles
- 2018 Australian Open

Final
- Champions: (Netherlands) Marjolein Buis (Japan) Yui Kamiji
- Runners-up: (Netherlands) Diede de Groot (Netherlands) Aniek van Koot
- Score: 6–0, 6–4

Events
| Singles | men | women | | boys | girls |
| Doubles | men | women | mixed | boys | girls |
| WC Singles | men | women | quad |
| WC Doubles | men | women | quad |
| Legends | men | women | mixed |
| ← 2017 · | Australian Open | · 2019 → |

Marjolein Buis and Yui Kamiji defeated the defending champion Aniek van Koot and her partner Diede de Groot in the final, 6–0, 6–4 to win the women's doubles wheelchair tennis title at the 2018 Australian Open.

Jiske Griffioen and van Koot were the reigning champions, but Griffioen did not participate.

== Seeds ==
1. (Netherlands) Marjolein Buis / (Japan) Yui Kamiji (champions)
2. (Netherlands) Diede de Groot / (Netherlands) Aniek van Koot (final)

== Draw ==
=== Key ===
- Q = Qualifier
- WC = Wild card
- LL = Lucky loser
- Alt = Alternate
- SE = Special exempt
- PR = Protected ranking
- ITF = ITF entry
- JE = Junior exempt
- w/o = Walkover
- r = Retired
- d = Defaulted
- SR = Special ranking

=== Draw ===
First round
1 | (Netherlands) Marjolein Buis (Japan) Yui Kamiji | 6 | 6
(South Africa) Kgothatso Montjane (United Kingdom) Lucy Shuker | 1 | 3
(Germany) Sabine Ellerbrock (Germany) Katharina Krüger | 2 | 4
2 | (Netherlands) Diede de Groot (Netherlands) Aniek van Koot | 6 | 6

Final
1 | (Netherlands) Marjolein Buis (Japan) Yui Kamiji | 6 | 6
2 | (Netherlands) Diede de Groot (Netherlands) Aniek van Koot | 0 | 4
