= 2018 Australian Open – Wheelchair women's singles =

Wheelchair women's singles
- 2018 Australian Open

Final
- Champion: (Netherlands) Diede de Groot
- Runner-up: (Japan) Yui Kamiji
- Score: 7–6^{(8–6)}, 6–4

Events
Singles	men	women		boys	girls
Doubles	men	women	mixed	boys	girls
WC Singles	men	women	quad
WC Doubles	men	women	quad
Legends	men	women	mixed
← 2017 ·	Australian Open	· 2019 →

Diede de Groot defeated the defending champion Yui Kamiji in the final, 7–6^{(8–6)}, 6–4 to win the women's singles wheelchair tennis title at the 2018 Australian Open.

== Seeds ==
1. (Japan) Yui Kamiji (final)
2. (Netherlands) Diede de Groot (champion)

== Draw ==
=== Key ===
- Q = Qualifier
- WC = Wild card
- LL = Lucky loser
- Alt = Alternate
- SE = Special exempt
- PR = Protected ranking
- ITF = ITF entry
- JE = Junior exempt
- w/o = Walkover
- r = Retired
- d = Defaulted
- SR = Special ranking

=== Draw ===
First round
1	(Japan) Yui Kamiji	6	7
(Netherlands) Marjolein Buis	3	5
(United Kingdom) Lucy Shuker	6	6^{6}	6^{4}
(Germany) Sabine Ellerbrock	2	7^{8}	7^{7}
(South Africa) Kgothatso Montjane	4	3
(Netherlands) Aniek van Koot	6	6
WC	(Germany) Katharina Krüger	1	1
2	(Netherlands) Diede de Groot	6	6

Semifinals
1	(Japan) Yui Kamiji	6	6
(Germany) Sabine Ellerbrock	3	2
(Netherlands) Aniek van Koot	2	3
2	(Netherlands) Diede de Groot	6	6

Final
1	(Japan) Yui Kamiji	6^{6}	4
2	(Netherlands) Diede de Groot	7^{8}	6
