= 2018 Australian Open =

- Date: 15–28 January 2018
- Edition: 106th Open Era (50th)
- Category: Grand Slam
- Draw: 128S / 64D /
- Prize money: A$55,000,000
- Surface: Hard (Plexicushion)
- Location: Melbourne, Victoria, Australia
- Venue: Melbourne Park
- Attendance: 743,667

Champions

Men's singles
- (Switzerland) Roger Federer

Women's singles
- (Denmark) Caroline Wozniacki

Men's doubles
- (Austria) Oliver Marach / (Croatia) Mate Pavić

Women's doubles
- (Hungary) Tímea Babos / (France) Kristina Mladenovic

Mixed doubles
- (Croatia) Mate Pavić / (Canada) Gabriela Dabrowski

Wheelchair men's singles
- (Japan) Shingo Kunieda

Wheelchair women's singles
- (Netherlands) Diede de Groot

Wheelchair quad singles
- (Australia) Dylan Alcott

Wheelchair men's doubles
- (France) Stéphane Houdet / (France) Nicolas Peifer

Wheelchair women's doubles
- (Netherlands) Marjolein Buis / (Japan) Yui Kamiji

Wheelchair quad doubles
- (Australia) Dylan Alcott / (Australia) Heath Davidson

Boys' singles
- (United States) Sebastian Korda

Girls' singles
- (Chinese Taipei) Liang En-shuo

Boys' doubles
- (France) Hugo Gaston / (France) Clément Tabur

Girls' doubles
- (Chinese Taipei) Liang En-shuo / (China) Wang Xinyu
- Australian Open

The 2018 Australian Open was a tennis tournament played at Melbourne Park between 15 and 28 January 2018, and was the first Grand Slam tournament of the 2018 season. The tournament consisted of events for professional players in singles, doubles and mixed doubles. Junior and wheelchair players compete in singles and doubles tournaments. Roger Federer was the defending champion in the men's singles event and successfully retained his title (his sixth), his then record twentieth Grand Slam major overall, defeating Marin Čilić in the final, while Caroline Wozniacki won the women's title, defeating Simona Halep in the final to win her first Grand Slam.

The tournament was the 106th edition of the event (the 50th edition of the Open Era). Additionally, it was the 200th Major tournament of the Open Era. It also marked the 30th anniversary of the Australian Open moving from the Kooyong Tennis Club to Melbourne Park. The tournament had a record attendance of 743,667 spectators.

== Tournament ==
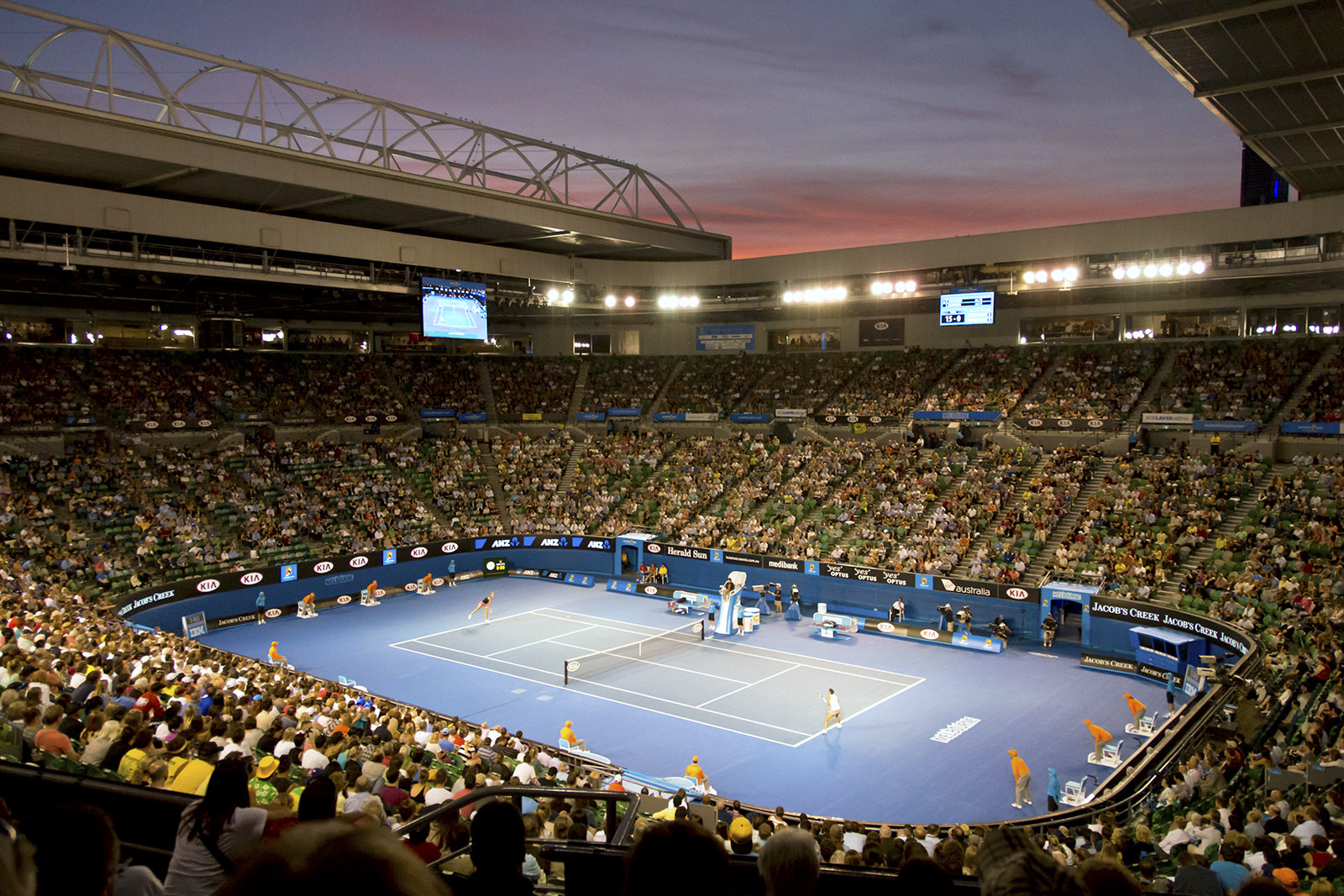
Rod Laver Arena where the Finals of the Australian Open took place

The 2018 Australian Open was the 106th edition of the tournament and was held at Melbourne Park in Melbourne, Victoria, Australia.

The tournament was run by the International Tennis Federation (ITF) and was part of the 2018 ATP World Tour and the 2018 WTA Tour calendars under the Grand Slam category. The tournament consisted of both men's and women's singles and doubles draws as well as a mixed doubles event. There were singles and doubles events for both boys and girls (players under 18), which were part of the Grade A category of tournaments, and also singles, doubles and quad events for men's and women's wheelchair tennis players as part of the NEC tour under the Grand Slam category.

The tournament was played on hard courts over a series of 25 courts, including the three main show courts: Rod Laver Arena, Hisense Arena and Margaret Court Arena.

== Point and prize money distribution ==
=== Point distribution ===
Below is a series of tables for each of the competitions showing the ranking points offered for each event.

==== Senior points ====
| Event | W | F | SF | QF | Round of 16 | Round of 32 | Round of 64 | Round of 128 | Q | Q3 | Q2 | Q1 |
| Men's singles | 2000 | 1200 | 720 | 360 | 180 | 90 | 45 | 10 | 25 | 16 | 8 | 0 |
| Men's doubles | 2000 | 1200 | 720 | 360 | 180 | 90 | 0 | —N/a | —N/a | —N/a | —N/a | —N/a |
| Women's singles | 2000 | 1300 | 780 | 430 | 240 | 130 | 70 | 10 | 40 | 30 | 20 | 2 |
| Women's doubles | 2000 | 1300 | 780 | 430 | 240 | 130 | 10 | —N/a | —N/a | —N/a | —N/a | —N/a |

==== Junior points ====
| Event | W | F | SF | QF | Round of 16 | Round of 32 | Q | Q3 |
| Boys' singles | 1000 | 600 | 370 | 200 | 100 | 45 | 30 | 20 |
| Girls' singles | 1000 | 600 | 370 | 200 | 100 | 45 | 30 | 20 |
| Boys' doubles | 750 | 450 | 275 | 150 | 75 | —N/a | —N/a | —N/a |
| Girls' doubles | 750 | 450 | 275 | 150 | 75 | —N/a | —N/a | —N/a |

=== Prize money ===
The Australian Open total prize money for 2018 was increased by 10% to a tournament record A$55,000,000.

| Event | W | F | SF | QF | Round of 16 | Round of 32 | Round of 64 | Round of 128^{1} | Q3 | Q2 | Q1 |
| Singles | A$4,000,000 | A$2,000,000 | A$880,000 | A$440,000 | A$240,000 | A$142,500 | A$90,000 | A$60,000 | A$30,000 | A$15,000 | A$7,500 |
| Doubles * | A$750,000 | A$375,000 | A$185,000 | A$90,000 | A$45,000 | A$22,500 | A$14,000 | —N/a | —N/a | —N/a | —N/a |
| Mixed doubles * | A$160,000 | A$80,000 | A$40,000 | A$20,000 | A$10,000 | A$5,000 | —N/a | —N/a | —N/a | —N/a | —N/a |

^{1}Qualifiers prize money was also the Round of 128 prize money.
*per team

== Singles players ==
2018 Australian Open – Men's singles

| Champion | | Runner-up | |
|---|---|---|---|
| (Switzerland) Roger Federer [2] | | (Croatia) Marin Čilić [6] | |
Semifinals out
| (United Kingdom) Kyle Edmund | | (South Korea) Chung Hyeon | |
Quarterfinals out
| (Spain) Rafael Nadal [1] | (Bulgaria) Grigor Dimitrov [3] | (United States) Tennys Sandgren | (Czech Republic) Tomáš Berdych [19] |
4th round out
| (Argentina) Diego Schwartzman [24] | (Spain) Pablo Carreño Busta [10] | (Australia) Nick Kyrgios [17] | (Italy) Andreas Seppi |
| (Austria) Dominic Thiem [5] | (Serbia) Novak Djokovic [14] | (Italy) Fabio Fognini [25] | (Hungary) Márton Fucsovics |
3rd round out
| (Bosnia and Herzegovina) Damir Džumhur [28] | (Ukraine) Alexandr Dolgopolov | (Luxembourg) Gilles Müller [23] | (United States) Ryan Harrison |
| (Russia) Andrey Rublev [30] | (France) Jo-Wilfried Tsonga [15] | (Georgia (country)) Nikoloz Basilashvili | (Croatia) Ivo Karlović |
| (France) Adrian Mannarino [26] | (Germany) Maximilian Marterer | (Spain) Albert Ramos Viñolas [21] | (Germany) Alexander Zverev [4] |
| (France) Julien Benneteau | (Argentina) Juan Martín del Potro [12] | (Argentina) Nicolás Kicker | (France) Richard Gasquet [29] |
2nd round out
| (Argentina) Leonardo Mayer | (Australia) John Millman (PR) | (Norway) Casper Ruud (Q) | (Australia) Matthew Ebden |
| (France) Gilles Simon | (Tunisia) Malek Jaziri | (Uruguay) Pablo Cuevas [31] | (Portugal) João Sousa |
| (United States) Mackenzie McDonald (Q) | (Cyprus) Marcos Baghdatis | (Serbia) Viktor Troicki | (Canada) Denis Shapovalov |
| (Uzbekistan) Denis Istomin | (Belgium) Ruben Bemelmans (Q) | (Japan) Yoshihito Nishioka (PR) | (Japan) Yūichi Sugita |
| (United States) Denis Kudla (Q) | (Czech Republic) Jiří Veselý | (Spain) Fernando Verdasco | (Switzerland) Stan Wawrinka [9] |
| (France) Gaël Monfils | (United States) Tim Smyczek (WC) | (Russia) Daniil Medvedev | (Germany) Peter Gojowczyk |
| (Belgium) David Goffin [7] | (Russia) Evgeny Donskoy | (Spain) Guillermo García López | (Russia) Karen Khachanov |
| (United States) Sam Querrey [13] | (Slovakia) Lukáš Lacko | (Italy) Lorenzo Sonego (Q) | (Germany) Jan-Lennard Struff |
1st round out
| (Dominican Republic) Víctor Estrella Burgos | (Chile) Nicolás Jarry | (Croatia) Borna Ćorić | (Italy) Paolo Lorenzi |
| (Serbia) Dušan Lajović | (France) Quentin Halys (Q) | (Austria) Andreas Haider-Maurer (PR) | (United States) John Isner [16] |
| (Australia) Jason Kubler (WC) | (Romania) Marius Copil | (Italy) Salvatore Caruso (Q) | (Argentina) Federico Delbonis |
| (Russia) Mikhail Youzhny | (Israel) Dudi Sela | (Germany) Dustin Brown (Q) | (Canada) Vasek Pospisil (Q) |
| (Austria) Dennis Novak (Q) | (Sweden) Elias Ymer (Q) | (India) Yuki Bhambri (Q) | (Spain) David Ferrer |
| (Brazil) Rogério Dutra Silva | (Australia) Alex Bolt (WC) | (Greece) Stefanos Tsitsipas | (United States) Kevin King (Q) |
| (South Africa) Kevin Anderson [11] | (France) Pierre-Hugues Herbert | (Austria) Gerald Melzer | (France) Lucas Pouille [18] |
| (Germany) Philipp Kohlschreiber [27] | (France) Corentin Moutet (WC) | (Serbia) Laslo Đere | (United States) Jack Sock [8] |
| (Argentina) Guido Pella | (United States) Steve Johnson | (Czech Republic) Václav Šafránek (Q) | (Italy) Matteo Berrettini (LL) |
| (Spain) Roberto Bautista Agut [20] | (Germany) Cedrik-Marcel Stebe | (France) Jérémy Chardy | (Lithuania) Ričardas Berankis (PR) |
| (United States) Donald Young | (Spain) Jaume Munar (Q) | (Australia) Alexei Popyrin (WC) | (United States) Jared Donaldson |
| (Germany) Mischa Zverev [32] | (Australia) Thanasi Kokkinakis (WC) | (Kazakhstan) Mikhail Kukushkin | (Italy) Thomas Fabbiano |
| (Germany) Matthias Bachinger (Q) | (Japan) Taro Daniel | (Germany) Florian Mayer | (Argentina) Horacio Zeballos |
| (Australia) Alex de Minaur (WC) | (France) Benoît Paire | (Canada) Peter Polansky (LL) | (United States) Francis Tiafoe |
| (Spain) Feliciano López | (Moldova) Radu Albot | (Australia) Jordan Thompson | (Canada) Milos Raonic [22] |
| (Slovenia) Blaž Kavčič | (Netherlands) Robin Haase | (South Korea) Kwon Soon-woo (WC) | (Slovenia) Aljaž Bedene |

2018 Australian Open – Women's singles

| Champion | | Runner-up | |
|---|---|---|---|
| (Denmark) Caroline Wozniacki [2] | | (Romania) Simona Halep [1] | |
Semifinals out
| (Germany) Angelique Kerber [21] | | (Belgium) Elise Mertens | |
Quarterfinals out
| (Czech Republic) Karolína Plíšková [6] | (United States) Madison Keys [17] | (Ukraine) Elina Svitolina [4] | (Spain) Carla Suárez Navarro |
4th round out
| (Japan) Naomi Osaka | (Czech Republic) Barbora Strýcová [20] | (Chinese Taipei) Hsieh Su-wei | (France) Caroline Garcia [8] |
| (Croatia) Petra Martić | (Czech Republic) Denisa Allertová (Q) | (Estonia) Anett Kontaveit [32] | (Slovakia) Magdaléna Rybáriková [19] |
3rd round out
| (United States) Lauren Davis | (Australia) Ashleigh Barty [18] | (United States) Bernarda Pera (LL) | (Czech Republic) Lucie Šafářová [29] |
| (Poland) Agnieszka Radwańska [26] | (Russia) Maria Sharapova | (Romania) Ana Bogdan | (Belarus) Aliaksandra Sasnovich |
| (Thailand) Luksika Kumkhum (Q) | (France) Alizé Cornet | (Poland) Magda Linette | (Ukraine) Marta Kostyuk (Q) |
| (Latvia) Jeļena Ostapenko [7] | (Estonia) Kaia Kanepi | (Ukraine) Kateryna Bondarenko | (Netherlands) Kiki Bertens [30] |
2nd round out
| (Canada) Eugenie Bouchard | (Germany) Andrea Petkovic | (Italy) Camila Giorgi | (Russia) Elena Vesnina [16] |
| (United Kingdom) Johanna Konta [9] | (Spain) Lara Arruabarrena | (Romania) Sorana Cîrstea | (Brazil) Beatriz Haddad Maia |
| (Spain) Garbiñe Muguruza [3] | (Ukraine) Lesia Tsurenko | (Croatia) Donna Vekić | (Latvia) Anastasija Sevastova [14] |
| (Kazakhstan) Yulia Putintseva | (Russia) Ekaterina Alexandrova | (Croatia) Mirjana Lučić-Baroni [28] | (Czech Republic) Markéta Vondroušová |
| (Switzerland) Belinda Bencic | (Romania) Irina-Camelia Begu | (Australia) Daria Gavrilova [23] | (Germany) Julia Görges [12] |
| (China) Zhang Shuai | (Russia) Daria Kasatkina [22] | (Australia) Olivia Rogowska (WC) | (Czech Republic) Kateřina Siniaková |
| (China) Duan Yingying | (Germany) Mona Barthel | (Puerto Rico) Monica Puig | (Hungary) Tímea Babos |
| (Russia) Anastasia Pavlyuchenkova [15] | (Belgium) Kirsten Flipkens | (United States) Nicole Gibbs | (Croatia) Jana Fett |
1st round out
| (Australia) Destanee Aiava (WC) | (France) Océane Dodin | (Slovakia) Jana Čepelová | (Czech Republic) Petra Kvitová [27] |
| (Belarus) Aryna Sabalenka | (Russia) Anna Kalinskaya (Q) | (Slovakia) Kristína Kučová (PR) | (Tunisia) Ons Jabeur |
| (United States) Madison Brengle | (Russia) Anna Blinkova (Q) | (Netherlands) Richèl Hogenkamp | (United States) Kristie Ahn (WC) |
| (Australia) Ajla Tomljanović (WC) | (Kazakhstan) Zarina Diyas | (Australia) Lizette Cabrera (WC) | (Paraguay) Verónica Cepede Royg |
| (France) Jessika Ponchet (WC) | (China) Zhu Lin (Q) | (Russia) Natalia Vikhlyantseva | (Czech Republic) Kristýna Plíšková |
| (Germany) Anna-Lena Friedsam (PR) | (Japan) Nao Hibino | (Germany) Tatjana Maria | (United States) Varvara Lepchenko |
| (France) Kristina Mladenovic [11] | (United Kingdom) Heather Watson | (Slovenia) Polona Hercog | (China) Wang Qiang |
| (United States) Shelby Rogers | (United States) Christina McHale | (Japan) Kurumi Nara | (Germany) Carina Witthöft |
| (United States) Venus Williams [5] | (Sweden) Johanna Larsson | (Belgium) Alison Van Uytvanck | (Russia) Ekaterina Makarova [31] |
| (United States) Irina Falconi (Q) | (Slovakia) Viktória Kužmová (Q) | (China) Wang Xinyu (WC) | (United States) Sofia Kenin |
| (United States) Sloane Stephens [13] | (France) Pauline Parmentier | (United States) Jennifer Brady | (Slovakia) Anna Karolína Schmiedlová (Q) |
| (China) Peng Shuai [25] | (Australia) Jaimee Fourlis (WC) | (Greece) Maria Sakkari | (Serbia) Ivana Jorović (Q) |
| (Italy) Francesca Schiavone | (Colombia) Mariana Duque Mariño | (Romania) Monica Niculescu | (Serbia) Aleksandra Krunić |
| (Slovakia) Dominika Cibulková [24] | (Australia) Samantha Stosur | (Poland) Magdalena Fręch (Q) | (United States) CoCo Vandeweghe [10] |
| (Ukraine) Kateryna Kozlova | (Switzerland) Viktorija Golubic (Q) | (United States) Alison Riske | (United States) Taylor Townsend |
| (United States) Catherine Bellis | (Bulgaria) Viktoriya Tomova (LL) | (Japan) Misa Eguchi (PR) | (Romania) Mihaela Buzărnescu |

== Champions ==
=== Seniors ===
==== Men's singles ====
- (Switzerland) Roger Federer def. (Croatia) Marin Čilić, 6–2, 6–7^{(5–7)}, 6–3, 3–6, 6–1

==== Women's singles ====
- (Denmark) Caroline Wozniacki def. (Romania) Simona Halep, 7–6^{(7–2)}, 3–6, 6–4

==== Men's doubles ====
- (Austria) Oliver Marach / (Croatia) Mate Pavić def. (Colombia) Juan Sebastián Cabal / (Colombia) Robert Farah, 6–4, 6–4

==== Women's doubles ====
- (Hungary) Tímea Babos / (France) Kristina Mladenovic def. (Russia) Ekaterina Makarova / (Russia) Elena Vesnina, 6–4, 6–3

==== Mixed doubles ====
- (Canada) Gabriela Dabrowski / (Croatia) Mate Pavić def. (Hungary) Tímea Babos / (India) Rohan Bopanna, 2–6, 6–4, [11–9]

=== Juniors ===
==== Boys' singles ====
- (United States) Sebastian Korda def. (Chinese Taipei) Tseng Chun-hsin, 7–6^{(8–6)}, 6–4

==== Girls' singles ====
- (Chinese Taipei) Liang En-shuo def. (France) Clara Burel, 6–3, 6–4

==== Boys' doubles ====
- (France) Hugo Gaston / (France) Clément Tabur def. (Germany) Rudolf Molleker / (Germany) Henri Squire, 6–2, 6–2

==== Girls' doubles ====
- (Chinese Taipei) Liang En-shuo / (China) Wang Xinyu def. (Papua New Guinea) Violet Apisah / (Switzerland) Lulu Sun, 7–6^{(7–4)}, 4–6, [10–5]

=== Wheelchair events ===
==== Wheelchair men's singles ====
- (Japan) Shingo Kunieda def. (France) Stéphane Houdet, 4–6, 6–1, 7–6^{(7–3)}

==== Wheelchair women's singles ====
- (Netherlands) Diede de Groot def. (Japan) Yui Kamiji, 7–6^{(8–6)}, 6–4

==== Wheelchair quad singles ====
- (Australia) Dylan Alcott def. (United States) David Wagner, 7–6^{(7–1)}, 6–1

==== Wheelchair men's doubles ====
- (France) Stéphane Houdet / (France) Nicolas Peifer def. (United Kingdom) Alfie Hewett / (United Kingdom) Gordon Reid, 6–4, 6–2

==== Wheelchair women's doubles ====
- (Netherlands) Marjolein Buis / (Japan) Yui Kamiji def. (Netherlands) Diede de Groot / (Netherlands) Aniek van Koot, 6–0, 6–4

==== Wheelchair quad doubles ====
- (Australia) Dylan Alcott / (Australia) Heath Davidson def. (United Kingdom) Andrew Lapthorne / (United States) David Wagner, 6–0, 6–7^{(5–7)}, [10–6]

== Singles seeds ==
The following are the seeded players and notable players who have withdrawn from the event. Seedings are arranged according to ATP and WTA rankings on 8 January 2018, while ranking and points before are as of 15 January 2018. Points after are as of 29 January 2018.

=== Men's singles ===
| Seed | Rank | Player | Points before | Points defending | Points won | Points after | Status |
|---|---|---|---|---|---|---|---|
| 1 | 1 | (Spain) Rafael Nadal | 10,600 | 1,200 | 360 | 9,760 | Quarterfinals retired against (Croatia) Marin Čilić [6] |
| 2 | 2 | (Switzerland) Roger Federer | 9,605 | 2,000 | 2,000 | 9,605 | Champion, defeated (Croatia) Marin Čilić [6] |
| 3 | 3 | (Bulgaria) Grigor Dimitrov | 4,990 | 720 | 360 | 4,630 | Quarterfinals lost to (United Kingdom) Kyle Edmund |
| 4 | 4 | (Germany) Alexander Zverev | 4,610 | 90 | 90 | 4,610 | Third round lost to (South Korea) Chung Hyeon |
| 5 | 5 | (Austria) Dominic Thiem | 4,060 | 180 | 180 | 4,060 | Fourth round lost to (United States) Tennys Sandgren |
| 6 | 6 | (Croatia) Marin Čilić | 3,805 | 45 | 1,200 | 4,960 | Runner-up, lost to (Switzerland) Roger Federer [2] |
| 7 | 7 | (Belgium) David Goffin | 3,775 | 360 | 45 | 3,460 | Second round lost to (France) Julien Benneteau |
| 8 | 9 | (United States) Jack Sock | 2,960 | 90 | 10 | 2,880 | First round lost to (Japan) Yūichi Sugita |
| 9 | 8 | (Switzerland) Stan Wawrinka | 3,060 | 720 | 45 | 2,385 | Second round lost to (United States) Tennys Sandgren |
| 10 | 11 | (Spain) Pablo Carreño Busta | 2,615 | 90 | 180 | 2,705 | Fourth round lost to (Croatia) Marin Čilić [6] |
| 11 | 12 | (South Africa) Kevin Anderson | 2,610 | 0 | 10 | 2,620 | First round lost to (United Kingdom) Kyle Edmund |
| 12 | 10 | (Argentina) Juan Martín del Potro | 2,725 | 0 | 90 | 2,815 | Third round lost to (Czech Republic) Tomáš Berdych [19] |
| 13 | 13 | (United States) Sam Querrey | 2,535 | 90 | 45 | 2,490 | Second round lost to (Hungary) Márton Fucsovics |
| 14 | 14 | (Serbia) Novak Djokovic | 2,335 | 45 | 180 | 2,470 | Fourth round lost to (South Korea) Chung Hyeon |
| 15 | 15 | (France) Jo-Wilfried Tsonga | 2,320 | 360 | 90 | 2,050 | Third round lost to (Australia) Nick Kyrgios [17] |
| 16 | 16 | (United States) John Isner | 2,265 | 45 | 10 | 2,230 | First round lost to (Australia) Matthew Ebden |
| 17 | 17 | (Australia) Nick Kyrgios | 2,260 | 45 | 180 | 2,395 | Fourth round lost to (Bulgaria) Grigor Dimitrov [3] |
| 18 | 18 | (France) Lucas Pouille | 2,235 | 10 | 10 | 2,235 | First round lost to (Belgium) Ruben Bemelmans [Q] |
| 19 | 20 | (Czech Republic) Tomáš Berdych | 2,050 | 90 | 360 | 2,320 | Quarterfinals lost to (Switzerland) Roger Federer [2] |
| 20 | 21 | (Spain) Roberto Bautista Agut | 2,015 | 180 | 10 | 1,845 | First round lost to (Spain) Fernando Verdasco |
| 21 | 22 | (Spain) Albert Ramos Viñolas | 1,845 | 10 | 90 | 1,925 | Third round lost to (Serbia) Novak Djokovic [14] |
| 22 | 23 | (Canada) Milos Raonic | 1,750 | 360 | 10 | 1,400 | First round lost to (Slovakia) Lukáš Lacko |
| 23 | 28 | (Luxembourg) Gilles Müller | 1,490 | 45 | 90 | 1,535 | Third round lost to (Spain) Pablo Carreño Busta [10] |
| 24 | 26 | (Argentina) Diego Schwartzman | 1,675 | 45 | 180 | 1,810 | Fourth round lost to (Spain) Rafael Nadal [1] |
| 25 | 25 | (Italy) Fabio Fognini | 1,715 | 45 | 180 | 1,850 | Fourth round lost to (Czech Republic) Tomáš Berdych [19] |
| 26 | 27 | (France) Adrian Mannarino | 1,625 | 10 | 90 | 1,705 | Third round lost to (Austria) Dominic Thiem [5] |
| 27 | 29 | (Germany) Philipp Kohlschreiber | 1,415 | 90 | 10 | 1,335 | First round lost to (Japan) Yoshihito Nishioka [PR] |
| 28 | 30 | (Bosnia and Herzegovina) Damir Džumhur | 1,391 | 10 | 90 | 1,471 | Third round lost to (Spain) Rafael Nadal [1] |
| 29 | 31 | (France) Richard Gasquet | 1,375 | 90 | 90 | 1,375 | Third round lost to (Switzerland) Roger Federer [2] |
| 30 | 32 | (Russia) Andrey Rublev | 1,373 | 70+60 | 90+6 | 1,339 | Third round lost to (Bulgaria) Grigor Dimitrov [3] |
| 31 | 34 | (Uruguay) Pablo Cuevas | 1,345 | 10 | 45 | 1,380 | Second round lost to (United States) Ryan Harrison |
| 32 | 35 | (Germany) Mischa Zverev | 1,302 | 360 | 10 | 952 | First round retired against (South Korea) Chung Hyeon |

The following players would have been seeded, but they withdrew from the event.

| Rank | Player | Points before | Points defending | Points after | Withdrawal reason |
|---|---|---|---|---|---|
| 19 | (United Kingdom) Andy Murray | 2,140 | 180 | 1,960 | Hip injury |
| 24 | (Japan) Kei Nishikori | 1,735 | 180 | 1,555 | Wrist injury |

=== Women's singles ===
| Seed | Rank | Player | Points before | Points defending | Points won | Points after | Status |
|---|---|---|---|---|---|---|---|
| 1 | 1 | (Romania) Simona Halep | 6,425 | 10 | 1,300 | 7,715 | Runner-up, lost to (Denmark) Caroline Wozniacki [2] |
| 2 | 2 | (Denmark) Caroline Wozniacki | 6,095 | 130 | 2,000 | 7,965 | Champion, defeated (Romania) Simona Halep [1] |
| 3 | 3 | (Spain) Garbiñe Muguruza | 6,050 | 430 | 70 | 5,690 | Second round lost to (Chinese Taipei) Hsieh Su-wei |
| 4 | 4 | (Ukraine) Elina Svitolina | 5,785 | 130 | 430 | 6,085 | Quarterfinals lost to (Belgium) Elise Mertens |
| 5 | 5 | (United States) Venus Williams | 5,568 | 1,300 | 10 | 4,278 | First round lost to (Switzerland) Belinda Bencic |
| 6 | 6 | (Czech Republic) Karolína Plíšková | 5,445 | 430 | 430 | 5,445 | Quarterfinals lost to (Romania) Simona Halep [1] |
| 7 | 7 | (Latvia) Jeļena Ostapenko | 4,901 | 130 | 130 | 4,901 | Third round lost to (Estonia) Anett Kontaveit [32] |
| 8 | 8 | (France) Caroline Garcia | 4,385 | 130 | 240 | 4,495 | Fourth round lost to (United States) Madison Keys [17] |
| 9 | 10 | (United Kingdom) Johanna Konta | 3,185 | 430 | 70 | 2,825 | Second round lost to (United States) Bernarda Pera [LL] |
| 10 | 9 | (United States) CoCo Vandeweghe | 3,204 | 780 | 10 | 2,434 | First round lost to (Hungary) Tímea Babos |
| 11 | 11 | (France) Kristina Mladenovic | 2,935 | 10 | 10 | 2,935 | First round lost to (Romania) Ana Bogdan |
| 12 | 12 | (Germany) Julia Görges | 2,825 | 70 | 70 | 2,825 | Second round lost to (France) Alizé Cornet |
| 13 | 13 | (United States) Sloane Stephens | 2,803 | 0 | 10 | 2,813 | First round lost to (China) Zhang Shuai |
| 14 | 15 | (Latvia) Anastasija Sevastova | 2,600 | 130 | 70 | 2,540 | Second round lost to (Russia) Maria Sharapova |
| 15 | 18 | (Russia) Anastasia Pavlyuchenkova | 2,485 | 430 | 70 | 2,125 | Second round lost to (Ukraine) Kateryna Bondarenko |
| 16 | 19 | (Russia) Elena Vesnina | 2,220 | 130 | 70 | 2,160 | Second round lost to (Japan) Naomi Osaka |
| 17 | 20 | (United States) Madison Keys | 2,214 | 0 | 430 | 2,644 | Quarterfinals lost to (Germany) Angelique Kerber [21] |
| 18 | 17 | (Australia) Ashleigh Barty | 2,486 | 130 | 130 | 2,486 | Third round lost to (Japan) Naomi Osaka |
| 19 | 21 | (Slovakia) Magdaléna Rybáriková | 2,141 | (18) (Note: Rybáriková did not participate in the 2017 Australian Open. Accordingly, her 16th best result from the past 12 months will be subtracted from her ranking points instead.) | 240 | 2,363 | Fourth round lost to (Denmark) Caroline Wozniacki [2] |
| 20 | 24 | (Czech Republic) Barbora Strýcová | 1,940 | 240 | 240 | 1,940 | Fourth round lost to (Czech Republic) Karolína Plíšková [6] |
| 21 | 16 | (Germany) Angelique Kerber | 2,491 | 240 | 780 | 3,031 | Semifinals lost to (Romania) Simona Halep [1] |
| 22 | 25 | (Russia) Daria Kasatkina | 1,905 | 10 | 70 | 1,965 | Second round lost to (Poland) Magda Linette |
| 23 | 23 | (Australia) Daria Gavrilova | 1,990 | 240 | 70 | 1,820 | Second round lost to (Belgium) Elise Mertens |
| 24 | 26 | (Slovakia) Dominika Cibulková | 1,860 | 130 | 10 | 1,740 | First round lost to (Estonia) Kaia Kanepi |
| 25 | 27 | (China) Peng Shuai | 1,765 | 70 | 10 | 1,705 | First round lost to (Ukraine) Marta Kostyuk [Q] |
| 26 | 35 | (Poland) Agnieszka Radwańska | 1,510 | 70 | 130 | 1,570 | Third round lost to (Chinese Taipei) Hsieh Su-wei |
| 27 | 28 | (Czech Republic) Petra Kvitová | 1,708 | 0 | 10 | 1,718 | First round lost to (Germany) Andrea Petkovic |
| 28 | 30 | (Croatia) Mirjana Lučić-Baroni | 1,618 | 780 | 70 | 908 | Second round lost to (Belarus) Aliaksandra Sasnovich |
| 29 | 29 | (Czech Republic) Lucie Šafářová | 1,650 | 70 | 130 | 1,710 | Third round lost to (Czech Republic) Karolína Plíšková [6] |
| 30 | 32 | (Netherlands) Kiki Bertens | 1,605 | 10 | 130 | 1,725 | Third round lost to (Denmark) Caroline Wozniacki [2] |
| 31 | 31 | (Russia) Ekaterina Makarova | 1,605 | 240 | 10 | 1,375 | First round lost to (Romania) Irina-Camelia Begu |
| 32 | 33 | (Estonia) Anett Kontaveit | 1,560 | 10+80 | 240+30 | 1,740 | Fourth round lost to (Spain) Carla Suárez Navarro |

The following players would have been seeded, but they withdrew or not entered from the event.

| Rank | Player | Points before | Points defending | Points after | Withdrawal reason |
|---|---|---|---|---|---|
| 14 | (Russia) Svetlana Kuznetsova | 2,702 | 240 | 2,462 | Left wrist injury |
| 22 | (United States) Serena Williams | 2,000 | 2,000 | 0 | Maternity |

== Doubles seeds ==
=== Men's doubles ===
| Team | | Rank^{1} | Seed |
|---|---|---|---|
| (Poland) Łukasz Kubot | (Brazil) Marcelo Melo | 2 | 1 |
| (Finland) Henri Kontinen | (Australia) John Peers | 7 | 2 |
| (Netherlands) Jean-Julien Rojer | (Romania) Horia Tecău | 15 | 3 |
| (France) Pierre-Hugues Herbert | (France) Nicolas Mahut | 17 | 4 |
| (United Kingdom) Jamie Murray | (Brazil) Bruno Soares | 19 | 5 |
| (United States) Bob Bryan | (United States) Mike Bryan | 24 | 6 |
| (Austria) Oliver Marach | (Croatia) Mate Pavić | 34 | 7 |
| (South Africa) Raven Klaasen | (New Zealand) Michael Venus | 40 | 8 |
| (Spain) Feliciano López | (Spain) Marc López | 44 | 9 |
| (India) Rohan Bopanna | (France) Édouard Roger-Vasselin | 45 | 10 |
| (Colombia) Juan Sebastián Cabal | (Colombia) Robert Farah | 50 | 11 |
| (Uruguay) Pablo Cuevas | (Argentina) Horacio Zeballos | 55 | 12 |
| (Mexico) Santiago González | (Chile) Julio Peralta | 57 | 13 |
| (Croatia) Ivan Dodig | (Spain) Fernando Verdasco | 71 | 14 |
| (Poland) Marcin Matkowski | (Pakistan) Aisam-ul-Haq Qureshi | 71 | 15 |
| (United States) Rajeev Ram | (India) Divij Sharan | 72 | 16 |

- ^{1} Rankings are as of 8 January 2018.

=== Women's doubles ===
| Team | | Rank^{1} | Seed |
|---|---|---|---|
| (Chinese Taipei) Latisha Chan | (Czech Republic) Andrea Sestini Hlaváčková | 6 | 1 |
| (Russia) Ekaterina Makarova | (Russia) Elena Vesnina | 6 | 2 |
| (Australia) Ashleigh Barty | (Australia) Casey Dellacqua | 20 | 3 |
| (Czech Republic) Lucie Šafářová | (Czech Republic) Barbora Strýcová | 21 | 4 |
| (Hungary) Tímea Babos | (France) Kristina Mladenovic | 33 | 5 |
| (Canada) Gabriela Dabrowski | (China) Xu Yifan | 34 | 6 |
| (Netherlands) Kiki Bertens | (Sweden) Johanna Larsson | 41 | 7 |
| (Chinese Taipei) Hsieh Su-wei | (China) Peng Shuai | 46 | 8 |
| (Slovenia) Andreja Klepač | (Spain) María José Martínez Sánchez | 48 | 9 |
| (Romania) Irina-Camelia Begu | (Romania) Monica Niculescu | 55 | 10 |
| (Japan) Shuko Aoyama | (China) Yang Zhaoxuan | 55 | 11 |
| (United States) Raquel Atawo | (Germany) Anna-Lena Grönefeld | 57 | 12 |
| (United States) Nicole Melichar | (Czech Republic) Květa Peschke | 58 | 13 |
| (Chinese Taipei) Chan Hao-ching | (Slovenia) Katarina Srebotnik | 59 | 14 |
| (Poland) Alicja Rosolska | (United States) Abigail Spears | 59 | 15 |
| (Czech Republic) Barbora Krejčíková | (Czech Republic) Kateřina Siniaková | 61 | 16 |

- ^{1} Rankings are as of 8 January 2018.

=== Mixed doubles ===
| Team | | Rank^{1} | Seed |
|---|---|---|---|
| (Chinese Taipei) Latisha Chan | (United Kingdom) Jamie Murray | 10 | 1 |
| (Australia) Casey Dellacqua | (Australia) John Peers | 13 | 2 |
| (Russia) Ekaterina Makarova | (Brazil) Bruno Soares | 13 | 3 |
| (Czech Republic) Květa Peschke | (Finland) Henri Kontinen | 23 | 4 |
| (Hungary) Tímea Babos | (India) Rohan Bopanna | 26 | 5 |
| (Czech Republic) Andrea Sestini Hlaváčková | (France) Édouard Roger-Vasselin | 31 | 6 |
| (Chinese Taipei) Chan Hao-ching | (New Zealand) Michael Venus | 32 | 7 |
| (Canada) Gabriela Dabrowski | (Croatia) Mate Pavić | 34 | 8 |

- ^{1} Rankings are as of 8 January 2018.

== Main draw wildcard entries ==
=== Men's singles ===
- (Australia) Alex Bolt
- (Australia) Thanasi Kokkinakis
- (Australia) Jason Kubler
- (South Korea) Kwon Soon-woo
- (Australia) Alex de Minaur
- (France) Corentin Moutet
- (Australia) Alexei Popyrin
- (United States) Tim Smyczek

=== Women's singles ===
- (United States) Kristie Ahn
- (Australia) Destanee Aiava
- (Australia) Lizette Cabrera
- (Australia) Jaimee Fourlis
- (France) Jessika Ponchet
- (Australia) Olivia Rogowska
- (Australia) Ajla Tomljanović
- (China) Wang Xinyu

=== Men's doubles ===
- (Australia) Alex Bolt / (Australia) Bradley Mousley
- ~~(Australia) James Duckworth / (Australia) Alex de Minaur~~
- (Australia) Matthew Ebden / (Australia) John Millman
- (Australia) Sam Groth / (Australia) Lleyton Hewitt
- (Australia) Thanasi Kokkinakis / (Australia) Jordan Thompson
- (Australia) Max Purcell / (Australia) Luke Saville
- (Thailand) Sanchai Ratiwatana / (Thailand) Sonchat Ratiwatana

=== Women's doubles ===
- (Australia) Alison Bai / (Australia) Zoe Hives
- (Australia) Naiktha Bains / (Australia) Isabelle Wallace
- (Australia) Kimberly Birrell / (Australia) Jaimee Fourlis
- (Australia) Priscilla Hon / (Australia) Ajla Tomljanović
- (China) Jiang Xinyu / (China) Tang Qianhui
- (Australia) Jessica Moore / (Australia) Ellen Perez
- (Australia) Astra Sharma / (Australia) Belinda Woolcock

=== Mixed doubles ===
- (Australia) Monique Adamczak / (Australia) Matthew Ebden
- (Australia) Lizette Cabrera / (Australia) Alex Bolt
- (Australia) Zoe Hives / (Australia) Bradley Mousley
- (Australia) Priscilla Hon / (Australia) Matt Reid
- (Australia) Ellen Perez / (Australia) Andrew Whittington
- (Australia) Arina Rodionova / (Australia) John-Patrick Smith
- (Australia) Storm Sanders / (Australia) Marc Polmans
- (Australia) Samantha Stosur / (Australia) Sam Groth

== Main draw qualifier entries ==
The qualifying competition took place in Melbourne Park on 10 to 14 January 2018 (was originally to end on 13 January, but got rescheduled due to heavy rain). However, matches were extended to 5 days due to bad weather on the third day of qualifying.

=== Men's singles ===
==== Qualifiers ====
1. (Italy) Salvatore Caruso
2. (Austria) Dennis Novak
3. (Spain) Jaume Munar
4. (France) Quentin Halys
5. (Canada) Vasek Pospisil
6. (United States) Kevin King
7. (United States) Denis Kudla
8. (United States) Mackenzie McDonald
9. (Sweden) Elias Ymer
10. (Germany) Dustin Brown
11. (Norway) Casper Ruud
12. (Italy) Lorenzo Sonego
13. (Belgium) Ruben Bemelmans
14. (Czech Republic) Václav Šafránek
15. (India) Yuki Bhambri
16. (Germany) Matthias Bachinger

==== Lucky losers ====
1. (Canada) Peter Polansky
2. (Italy) Matteo Berrettini

=== Women's singles ===
==== Qualifiers ====
1. (Russia) Anna Kalinskaya
2. (Russia) Anna Blinkova
3. (China) Zhu Lin
4. (Switzerland) Viktorija Golubic
5. (United States) Irina Falconi
6. (Czech Republic) Denisa Allertová
7. (Serbia) Ivana Jorović
8. (Slovakia) Viktória Kužmová
9. (Ukraine) Marta Kostyuk
10. (Slovakia) Anna Karolína Schmiedlová
11. (Thailand) Luksika Kumkhum
12. (Poland) Magdalena Fręch

==== Lucky losers ====
1. (Bulgaria) Viktoriya Tomova
2. (United States) Bernarda Pera

== Protected ranking ==
The following players were accepted directly into the main draw using a protected ranking:

Men's singles

- (Austria) Andreas Haider-Maurer (63)
- (Japan) Yoshihito Nishioka (66)
- (Australia) John Millman (81)
- (Lithuania) Ričardas Berankis (92)

Women's singles

- (Germany) Anna-Lena Friedsam (50)
- (Russia) ~~Margarita Gasparyan (62)~~
- (Slovakia) Kristína Kučová (95)
- (Japan) Misa Eguchi (109)

== Withdrawals ==
The following players were accepted directly into the main tournament, but withdrew with injuries or other reasons.

Before the tournament

Men's singles

- ‡ (Belgium) Steve Darcis (77) → replaced by (Austria) Gerald Melzer (101)
- ‡ (Japan) Kei Nishikori (22) → replaced by (Brazil) Rogério Dutra Silva (102)
- ‡ (United Kingdom) Andy Murray (16) → replaced by (Cyprus) Marcos Baghdatis (103)
- § (Serbia) Filip Krajinović (34) → replaced by (Canada) Peter Polansky (LL)
- § (Chinese Taipei) Lu Yen-hsun (71) → replaced by (Italy) Matteo Berrettini (LL)

Women's singles

- † (Russia) Svetlana Kuznetsova (12) → replaced by (Netherlands) Richèl Hogenkamp (106)
- † (China) Zheng Saisai (94) → replaced by (Colombia) Mariana Duque Mariño (107)
- ‡ (Germany) Laura Siegemund (69) → replaced by (United States) Sofia Kenin (108)
- ‡ (Switzerland) Timea Bacsinszky (39) → replaced by (Slovakia) Jana Čepelová (109)
- ‡ (United States) Serena Williams (22) → replaced by (Japan) Misa Eguchi (109 PR)
- ‡ (Spain) Sara Sorribes Tormo (102) → replaced by (United States) Nicole Gibbs (110)
- @ (Croatia) Ana Konjuh (44) → replaced by (Bulgaria) Viktoriya Tomova (LL)
- § (Russia) Margarita Gasparyan (62 PR) → replaced by (United States) Bernarda Pera (LL)

† – not included on entry list
‡ – withdrew from entry list before qualifying began
@ – withdrew from entry list after qualifying began
§ – withdrew from main draw

== Retirements ==
Men's singles

- (South Korea) Chung Hyeon
- (Spain) Rafael Nadal
- (France) Gilles Simon
- (Germany) Mischa Zverev

| Preceded by 2017 US Open | Grand Slams | Succeeded by 2018 French Open |
