= 2018 Australian Open – Women's doubles =

Women's doubles
- 2018 Australian Open

Final
- Champions: (Hungary) Tímea Babos (France) Kristina Mladenovic
- Runners-up: (Russia) Ekaterina Makarova (Russia) Elena Vesnina
- Score: 6–4, 6–3

Details
- Draw: 64
- Seeds: 16

Events
Singles	men	women		boys	girls
Doubles	men	women	mixed	boys	girls
WC Singles	men	women	quad
WC Doubles	men	women	quad
Legends	men	women	mixed
- Australian Open

Tímea Babos and Kristina Mladenovic won the women's doubles tennis title at the 2018 Australian Open, defeating Ekaterina Makarova and Elena Vesnina in the final, 6–4, 6–3. It was the first Grand Slam title for Babos, who became the first Hungarian player to win a Grand Slam event since Andrea Temesvári in the 1986 French Open and the second Grand Slam title for Mladenovic.

Makarova and Vesnina were attempting to achieve the career Super Slam in doubles.

Bethanie Mattek-Sands and Lucie Šafářová were the defending champions, but Mattek-Sands could not participate this year due to injury. Šafářová played alongside Barbora Strýcová, but lost in the quarterfinals to Hsieh Su-wei and Peng Shuai.

== Seeds ==
1. (Chinese Taipei) Latisha Chan / (Czech Republic) Andrea Sestini Hlaváčková (quarterfinals)
2. (Russia) Ekaterina Makarova / (Russia) Elena Vesnina (final)
3. (Australia) Ashleigh Barty / (Australia) Casey Dellacqua (second round)
4. (Czech Republic) Lucie Šafářová / (Czech Republic) Barbora Strýcová (quarterfinals)
5. (Hungary) Tímea Babos / (France) Kristina Mladenovic (champions)
6. (Canada) Gabriela Dabrowski / (China) Xu Yifan (quarterfinals)
7. (Netherlands) Kiki Bertens / (Sweden) Johanna Larsson (first round)
8. (Chinese Taipei) Hsieh Su-wei / (China) Peng Shuai (semifinals)

9. (Slovenia) Andreja Klepač / (Spain) María José Martínez Sánchez (first round)
10. (Romania) Irina-Camelia Begu / (Romania) Monica Niculescu (semifinals)
11. (Japan) Shuko Aoyama / (China) Yang Zhaoxuan (third round)
12. (United States) Raquel Atawo / (Germany) Anna-Lena Grönefeld (third round)
13. (United States) Nicole Melichar / (Czech Republic) Květa Peschke (third round)
14. (Chinese Taipei) Chan Hao-ching / (Slovenia) Katarina Srebotnik (third round)
15. (Poland) Alicja Rosolska / (United States) Abigail Spears (second round)
16. (Czech Republic) Barbora Krejčíková / (Czech Republic) Kateřina Siniaková (third round)

Click on the seed number of a player to go to their draw section.

== Draw ==
Key

- Q = Qualifier
- WC = Wild card
- LL = Lucky loser
- Alt = Alternate
- ITF = ITF entry
- PR = Protected ranking
- SR = Special ranking
- SE = Special exempt
- JE = Junior exempt
- JR = Junior Accelerator Programme entrant
- CO = College Accelerator Programme entrant
- NG = Next Gen Accelerator Program entrant
- w/o = Walkover
- r = Retired
- d = Defaulted

=== Finals ===
Quarterfinals
1	(Chinese Taipei) Latisha Chan (Czech Republic) Andrea Sestini Hlaváčková	4	6	6^{6}
5	(Hungary) Tímea Babos (France) Kristina Mladenovic	6	0	7^{8}
4	(Czech Republic) Lucie Šafářová (Czech Republic) Barbora Strýcová	1	4
8	(Chinese Taipei) Hsieh Su-wei (China) Peng Shuai	6	6
10	(Romania) Irina-Camelia Begu (Romania) Monica Niculescu	4	6	6
PR	(United States) Jennifer Brady (United States) Vania King	6	2	0
6	(Canada) Gabriela Dabrowski (China) Xu Yifan	6	1	6^{2}
2	(Russia) Ekaterina Makarova (Russia) Elena Vesnina	0	6	7^{7}

Semifinals
5	(Hungary) Tímea Babos (France) Kristina Mladenovic	6	6
8	(Chinese Taipei) Hsieh Su-wei (China) Peng Shuai	4	2
10	(Romania) Irina-Camelia Begu (Romania) Monica Niculescu	4	3
2	(Russia) Ekaterina Makarova (Russia) Elena Vesnina	6	6

Final
5	(Hungary) Tímea Babos (France) Kristina Mladenovic	6	6
2	(Russia) Ekaterina Makarova (Russia) Elena Vesnina	4	3

=== Top half ===
==== Section 1 ====
First round
1	(Chinese Taipei) L Chan (Czech Republic) A Sestini Hlaváčková	6	6
(China) X Han (China) C Liang	3	0
PR	(China) Q Wang (China) Y Wang	4	2
(Georgia (country)) O Kalashnikova (United States) V Lepchenko	6	6
(Germany) T Maria (France) P Parmentier	4	6	3
PR	(Netherlands) M Krajicek (Russia) A Kudryavtseva	6	1	6
(United Kingdom) L Robson (United States) C Vandeweghe	6^{3}	4
14	(Chinese Taipei) H-c Chan (Slovenia) K Srebotnik	7^{7}	6
9	(Slovenia) A Klepač (Spain) MJ Martínez Sánchez	3	3
(Switzerland) V Golubic (Serbia) N Stojanović	6	6
(Australia) Ar Rodionova (Russia) N Vikhlyantseva	2	2
(Ukraine) K Bondarenko (Serbia) A Krunić	6	6
(Latvia) J Ostapenko (Russia) A Pavlyuchenkova	0	6	0
PR	(Spain) L Arruabarrena (Spain) A Parra Santonja	6	4	6
(Russia) N Dzalamidze (Switzerland) X Knoll	5	3
5	(Hungary) T Babos (France) K Mladenovic	7	6

Second round
1	(Chinese Taipei) L Chan (Czech Republic) A Sestini Hlaváčková	6	7
(Georgia (country)) O Kalashnikova (United States) V Lepchenko	0	5
PR	(Netherlands) M Krajicek (Russia) A Kudryavtseva	6	3	6^{2}
14	(Chinese Taipei) H-c Chan (Slovenia) K Srebotnik	4	6	7^{7}
(Switzerland) V Golubic (Serbia) N Stojanović	7^{7}	6
(Ukraine) K Bondarenko (Serbia) A Krunić	6^{0}	2
PR	(Spain) L Arruabarrena (Spain) A Parra Santonja	6	3	4
5	(Hungary) T Babos (France) K Mladenovic	3	6	6

Third round
1	(Chinese Taipei) L Chan (Czech Republic) A Sestini Hlaváčková	6	6
14	(Chinese Taipei) H-c Chan (Slovenia) K Srebotnik	3	2
(Switzerland) V Golubic (Serbia) N Stojanović	5	2
5	(Hungary) T Babos (France) K Mladenovic	7	6

Quarterfinals
1	(Chinese Taipei) L Chan (Czech Republic) A Sestini Hlaváčková	4	6	6^{6}
5	(Hungary) T Babos (France) K Mladenovic	6	0	7^{8}

==== Section 2 ====
First round
4	(Czech Republic) L Šafářová (Czech Republic) B Strýcová	6	6
(United Kingdom) N Broady (United Kingdom) A Smith	2	1
(Ukraine) K Kozlova (Kazakhstan) Y Putintseva	3	3
(Romania) R Olaru (Ukraine) O Savchuk	6	6
(Russia) V Kudermetova (Belarus) A Sabalenka	2	2
(Romania) S Cîrstea (Brazil) B Haddad Maia	6	6
(France) A Cornet (United Kingdom) H Watson	2	7	4
15	(Poland) A Rosolska (United States) A Spears	6	5	6
12	(United States) R Atawo (Germany) A-L Grönefeld	7^{7}	6
WC	(Australia) A Sharma (Australia) B Woolcock	6^{2}	3
(Australia) M Adamczak (Australia) S Sanders	3	5
(Japan) E Hozumi (Japan) M Kato	6	7
(Ukraine) L Kichenok (Japan) M Ninomiya	6^{4}	2
Alt	(Netherlands) L Kerkhove (Belarus) L Marozava	7^{7}	6
(Romania) M Buzărnescu (Argentina) M Irigoyen	3	5
8	(Chinese Taipei) S-w Hsieh (China) S Peng	6	7

Second round
4	(Czech Republic) L Šafářová (Czech Republic) B Strýcová	6	6
(Romania) R Olaru (Ukraine) O Savchuk	2	2
(Romania) S Cîrstea (Brazil) B Haddad Maia	4	6	6
15	(Poland) A Rosolska (United States) A Spears	6	3	3
12	(United States) R Atawo (Germany) A-L Grönefeld	6	6
(Japan) E Hozumi (Japan) M Kato	1	1
Alt	(Netherlands) L Kerkhove (Belarus) L Marozava	4	1
8	(Chinese Taipei) S-w Hsieh (China) S Peng	6	6

Third round
4	(Czech Republic) L Šafářová (Czech Republic) B Strýcová	2	6	6
(Romania) S Cîrstea (Brazil) B Haddad Maia	6	0	4
12	(United States) R Atawo (Germany) A-L Grönefeld	4	2
8	(Chinese Taipei) S-w Hsieh (China) S Peng	6	6

Quarterfinals
4	(Czech Republic) L Šafářová (Czech Republic) B Strýcová	1	4
8	(Chinese Taipei) S-w Hsieh (China) S Peng	6	6

=== Bottom half ===
==== Section 3 ====
First round
7	(Netherlands) K Bertens (Sweden) J Larsson	6	6^{3}	1
(Ukraine) N Kichenok (Australia) An Rodionova	4	7^{7}	6
PR	(Germany) A-L Friedsam (Belgium) A Van Uytvanck	0^{r}
(Czech Republic) Kr Plíšková (Croatia) D Vekić	5
(Japan) N Hibino (Croatia) D Jurak	4	4
WC	(Australia) J Moore (Australia) E Perez	6	6
(Croatia) M Lučić-Baroni (Germany) A Petkovic	7^{8}	3	2
10	(Romania) I-C Begu (Romania) M Niculescu	6^{6}	6	6
13	(United States) N Melichar (Czech Republic) K Peschke	6	6^{5}	6
WC	(Australia) K Birrell (Australia) J Fourlis	4	7^{7}	1
(United States) M Brengle (Puerto Rico) M Puig	6	1	6
WC	(Australia) A Bai (Australia) Z Hives	4	6	4
(Australia) D Gavrilova (Russia) D Kasatkina	4	1
PR	(United States) J Brady (United States) V King	6	6
(Belgium) E Mertens (Netherlands) D Schuurs	3	5
3	(Australia) A Barty (Australia) C Dellacqua	6	7

Second round
(Ukraine) N Kichenok (Australia) An Rodionova	1	6	7^{7}
(Czech Republic) Kr Plíšková (Croatia) D Vekić	6	3	6^{2}
WC	(Australia) J Moore (Australia) E Perez	6	3	5
10	(Romania) I-C Begu (Romania) M Niculescu	3	6	7
13	(United States) N Melichar (Czech Republic) K Peschke	6	6
(United States) M Brengle (Puerto Rico) M Puig	2	2
PR	(United States) J Brady (United States) V King	6	6
3	(Australia) A Barty (Australia) C Dellacqua	4	2

Third round
(Ukraine) N Kichenok (Australia) An Rodionova	1^{r}
10	(Romania) I-C Begu (Romania) M Niculescu	4
13	(United States) N Melichar (Czech Republic) K Peschke	4	6^{5}
PR	(United States) J Brady (United States) V King	6	7^{7}

Quarterfinals
10	(Romania) I-C Begu (Romania) M Niculescu	4	6	6
PR	(United States) J Brady (United States) V King	6	2	0

==== Section 4 ====
First round
6	(Canada) G Dabrowski (China) Y Xu	6	6
(Belgium) K Flipkens (Italy) F Schiavone	3	2
(United States) C Bellis (Czech Republic) M Vondroušová	3	2
(Russia) E Alexandrova (Latvia) A Sevastova	6	6
WC	(China) X Jiang (China) Q Tang	6^{5}	5
(Germany) M Barthel (Germany) C Witthöft	7^{7}	7
(United States) T Townsend (Czech Republic) R Voráčová	4	4
11	(Japan) S Aoyama (China) Z Yang	6	6
16	(Czech Republic) B Krejčíková (Czech Republic) K Siniaková	7	6
WC	(Australia) P Hon (Australia) A Tomljanović	5	3
(Kazakhstan) Z Diyas (Poland) M Linette	6	6
WC	(Australia) N Bains (Australia) I Wallace	3	2
Alt	(Slovenia) D Jakupović (Russia) I Khromacheva	6	6
(United States) L Davis (United States) A Riske	4	2
(Canada) E Bouchard (United States) S Stephens	4	4
2	(Russia) E Makarova (Russia) E Vesnina	6	6

Second round
6	(Canada) G Dabrowski (China) Y Xu	6	6
(Russia) E Alexandrova (Latvia) A Sevastova	4	4
(Germany) M Barthel (Germany) C Witthöft	1	5
11	(Japan) S Aoyama (China) Z Yang	6	7
16	(Czech Republic) B Krejčíková (Czech Republic) K Siniaková	6	6
(Kazakhstan) Z Diyas (Poland) M Linette	4	2
Alt	(Slovenia) D Jakupović (Russia) I Khromacheva	2	3
2	(Russia) E Makarova (Russia) E Vesnina	6	6

Third round
6	(Canada) G Dabrowski (China) Y Xu	7^{8}	6
11	(Japan) S Aoyama (China) Z Yang	6^{6}	1
16	(Czech Republic) B Krejčíková (Czech Republic) K Siniaková	6^{2}	7^{7}	2
2	(Russia) E Makarova (Russia) E Vesnina	7^{7}	6^{4}	6

Quarterfinals
6	(Canada) G Dabrowski (China) Y Xu	6	1	6^{2}
2	(Russia) E Makarova (Russia) E Vesnina	0	6	7^{7}
