= 2018 Australian Open – Boys' doubles =

Boys' doubles
- 2018 Australian Open

Final
- Champions: (France) Hugo Gaston (France) Clément Tabur
- Runners-up: (Germany) Rudolf Molleker (Germany) Henri Squire
- Score: 6–2, 6–2

Events
Singles	men	women		boys	girls
Doubles	men	women	mixed	boys	girls
WC Singles	men	women	quad
WC Doubles	men	women	quad
Legends	men	women	mixed
- Australian Open

Hugo Gaston and Clément Tabur won the boys' doubles tennis title at the 2018 Australian Open, defeating Rudolf Molleker and Henri Squire in the final, 6–2, 6–2.

Hsu Yu-hsiou and Zhao Lingxi were the defending champions, but Hsu was no longer eligible to participate in junior tournaments and Zhao chose not to participate.

== Seeds ==
1. (Argentina) Sebastián Báez / (Brazil) Thiago Seyboth Wild (second round)
2. (United States) Sebastian Korda / (Colombia) Nicolás Mejía (quarterfinals)
3. (Japan) Naoki Tajima / (Russia) Alexey Zakharov (quarterfinals, withdrew)
4. (United Kingdom) Aidan McHugh / (Russia) Timofey Skatov (quarterfinals)

5. (United States) Tristan Boyer / (Argentina) Juan Manuel Cerúndolo (second round)
6. (Czech Republic) Tomáš Macháč / (Czech Republic) Ondřej Štyler (semifinals)
7. (France) Hugo Gaston / (France) Clément Tabur (champions)
8. (South Korea) Jeong Yeong-seok / (South Korea) Park Ui-sung (withdrew)

== Draw ==
Key

- Q = Qualifier
- WC = Wild card
- LL = Lucky loser
- Alt = Alternate
- ITF = ITF entry
- PR = Protected ranking
- SR = Special ranking
- SE = Special exempt
- JE = Junior exempt
- JR = Junior Accelerator Programme entrant
- CO = College Accelerator Programme entrant
- NG = Next Gen Accelerator Program entrant
- w/o = Walkover
- r = Retired
- d = Defaulted

=== Finals ===
Semifinals
Alt	(Germany) Rudolf Molleker (Germany) Henri Squire	6	6
(Romania) Filip Cristian Jianu (Argentina) Thiago Agustín Tirante	2	3
6	(Czech Republic) Tomáš Macháč (Czech Republic) Ondřej Štyler	4	6^{5}
7	(France) Hugo Gaston (France) Clément Tabur	6	7^{7}

Final
Alt	(Germany) Rudolf Molleker (Germany) Henri Squire	2	2
7	(France) Hugo Gaston (France) Clément Tabur	6	6

=== Top half ===
First round
1	(Argentina) Sebastián Báez (Brazil) Thiago Seyboth Wild	7	3
(United Kingdom) Jack Draper (France) Titouan Droguet	5	0^{r}
(South Africa) Philip Henning (Czech Republic) Andrew Paulson	6	7^{7}
(United States) Drew Baird (Dominican Republic) Nick Hardt	4	6^{1}
(Uzbekistan) Sergey Fomin (United States) Jaycer Lyeons	6	6
WC	(Australia) Campbell Salmon (Australia) Stefan Storch	3	3
(Croatia) Admir Kalender (Poland) Daniel Michalski	6	3	[4]
Alt	(Germany) Rudolf Molleker (Germany) Henri Squire	3	6	[10]
3	(Japan) Naoki Tajima (Russia) Alexey Zakharov	7^{7}	6
(Australia) Rinky Hijikata (Japan) Taisei Ichikawa	6^{1}	2
(Italy) Lorenzo Musetti (Italy) Giulio Zeppieri	5	6	[7]
WC	(Australia) Jayden Court (Australia) Alexander Crnokrak	7	4	[10]
(Romania) Filip Cristian Jianu (Argentina) Thiago Agustín Tirante	7^{7}	7^{7}
(Brazil) Matheus Pucinelli de Almeida (Brazil) João Lucas Reis da Silva	6^{3}	6^{4}
(Czech Republic) Jonáš Forejtek (Czech Republic) Dalibor Svrčina	6^{5}	3
5	(United States) Tristan Boyer (Argentina) Juan Manuel Cerúndolo	7^{7}	6

Second round
1	(Argentina) S Báez (Brazil) T Seyboth Wild	6	6^{5}	[12]
(South Africa) P Henning (Czech Republic) A Paulson	2	7^{7}	[14]
(Uzbekistan) S Fomin (United States) J Lyeons	5	2
Alt	(Germany) R Molleker (Germany) H Squire	7	6
3	(Japan) N Tajima (Russia) A Zakharov	6	6
WC	(Australia) J Court (Australia) A Crnokrak	4	3
(Romania) FC Jianu (Argentina) TA Tirante	6	6
5	(United States) T Boyer (Argentina) JM Cerúndolo	2	4

Quarterfinals
(South Africa) P Henning (Czech Republic) A Paulson	7^{7}	5	[5]
Alt	(Germany) R Molleker (Germany) H Squire	6^{3}	7	[10]
3	(Japan) N Tajima (Russia) A Zakharov
(Romania) FC Jianu (Argentina) TA Tirante	w/o

Semifinals
Alt	(Germany) R Molleker (Germany) H Squire	6	6
(Romania) FC Jianu (Argentina) TA Tirante	2	3

=== Bottom half ===
First round
6	(Czech Republic) Tomáš Macháč (Czech Republic) Ondřej Štyler	3	6	[10]
(Brazil) Igor Gimenez (United States) Sangeet Sridhar	6	3	[5]
(United States) Andrew Fenty (United States) William Woodall	6	7
(Chinese Taipei) Ray Ho (China) Mu Tao	3	5
(France) Jaimee Floyd Angele (Switzerland) Damien Wenger	6	6
WC	(Australia) Will Hann (Australia) Tristan Schoolkate	3	0
(Croatia) Duje Ajduković (Serbia) Marko Miladinović	2	2
4	(United Kingdom) Aidan McHugh (Russia) Timofey Skatov	6	6
7	(France) Hugo Gaston (France) Clément Tabur	6	6
(Netherlands) Jesper de Jong (Turkey) Yankı Erel	3	3
(Poland) Wojciech Marek (Chinese Taipei) Tseng Chun-hsin	6	6
(Australia) Thomas Bosancic (United Kingdom) George Loffhagen	3	2
(India) Siddhant Banthia (Malaysia) Christian Didier Chin	6	7^{7}
(Bulgaria) Adrian Andreev (Netherlands) Lodewijk Weststrate	1	6^{5}
WC	(Australia) Ken Cavrak (Australia) Dane Sweeny	0	4
2	(United States) Sebastian Korda (Colombia) Nicolás Mejía	6	6

Second round
6	(Czech Republic) T Macháč (Czech Republic) O Štyler	6	7
(United States) A Fenty (United States) W Woodall	4	5
(France) JF Angele (Switzerland) D Wenger	4	6^{5}
4	(United Kingdom) A McHugh (Russia) T Skatov	6	7^{7}
7	(France) H Gaston (France) C Tabur	6	6
(Poland) W Marek (Chinese Taipei) C-h Tseng	4	2
(India) S Banthia (Malaysia) CD Chin	4	4
2	(United States) S Korda (Colombia) N Mejía	6	6

Quarterfinals
6	(Czech Republic) T Macháč (Czech Republic) O Štyler	2	7	[10]
4	(United Kingdom) A McHugh (Russia) T Skatov	6	5	[6]
7	(France) H Gaston (France) C Tabur	6	6
2	(United States) S Korda (Colombia) N Mejía	3	4

Semifinals
6	(Czech Republic) T Macháč (Czech Republic) O Štyler	4	6^{5}
7	(France) H Gaston (France) C Tabur	6	7^{7}
