= Tennis at the 2022 Pacific Mini Games – Mixed doubles =

Mixed doubles at the 2022 Pacific Mini Games
- Venue: American Memorial Park and Pacific Islands Club
- Dates: 19–25 June
- Competitors: 29 from 15 nations

Medalists
gold medal	Violet Apisah; Matthew Stubbings	Papua New Guinea
silver medal	Saoirse Breen; William O'Connell	Fiji
bronze medal	Isabel Heras; Colin Sinclair	Northern Mariana Islands

The mixed doubles tennis event at the 2022 Pacific Mini Games took place at the American Memorial Park and Pacific Islands Club in Saipan, Northern Mariana Islands from 19 to 25 June 2022.

== Schedule ==
Date	20 June	21 June	22 June	23 June	24 June
Mixed doubles	Round of 32	Round of 16	Quarterfinals	Semifinals	Finals

== Seeds ==
All seeds per ATP rankings.

1. (Papua New Guinea) Violet Apisah/ (Papua New Guinea) Matthew Stubbings (champions, gold medalists)
2. (Papua New Guinea) Abigail Tere-Apisah/Mark Gibbons (semifinals, fourth place)
3. (Fiji) Saoirse Breen/ (Fiji) William O'Connell (finals, silver medalists)
4. (Northern Mariana Islands) Isabel Heras/ (Northern Mariana Islands) Colin Sinclair (semifinals, bronze medalists)
5. (Tonga) Ana Taminika/ (Tonga) Matavao Fanguana (second round)
6. (Tonga) Ela Vakaukamea/ (Tonga) Semisi Fanguna (quarterfinals)
7. (Samoa) Eleanor Schuster/ (Samoa) Leon So'Onalole (quarterfinals)
8. (French Polynesia) Vaiani Dusserre-Valleaux/ (French Polynesia) Gillian Osmont (second round)

Click on the seed number of a player to go to their draw section.

== Results ==
=== Finals ===
Semi-finals
1	(Papua New Guinea) Violet Apisah (Papua New Guinea) Matthew Stubbings	3	6	[10]
4	(Northern Mariana Islands) Isabel Heras (Northern Mariana Islands) Colin Sinclair	6	3	[7]
3	(Fiji) Saoirse Breen (Fiji) William O'Connell	3	7^{8}	[10]
2	(Papua New Guinea) Abigail Tere-Apisah (Papua New Guinea) Mark Gibbons	6	6^{6}	[8]

Final
1	(Papua New Guinea) Violet Apisah (Papua New Guinea) Matthew Stubbings	6	6
3	(Fiji) Saoirse Breen (Fiji) William O'Connell	3	1
Bronze medal
4	(Northern Mariana Islands) Isabel Heras (Northern Mariana Islands) Colin Sinclair	7	7
2	(Papua New Guinea) Abigail Tere-Apisah (Papua New Guinea) Mark Gibbons	5	5

=== Top half ===
==== Section 1 ====
Round of 32
(French Polynesia) Jennifer Ly (French Polynesia) Heimanarii Laisan	3	3
(Guam) Fremont Gibson (Guam) Camden Camacho	6	6
(Kiribati) Fakaofo Kaoa (Kiribati) Benjamin Kourabi	6	6
(Solomon Islands) Chloe Vazeriko Collinson (Solomon Islands) Junior Michael Miki	3	3
(Northern Mariana Islands) Asia Daisy Raulerson (Northern Mariana Islands) Robert Schorr	4	5
5	(Tonga) Ana Taminika (Tonga) Matavao Fanguana	6	7

Round of 16
1	(Papua New Guinea) Violet Apisah (Papua New Guinea) Matthew Stubbings	6	6
(Guam) Fremont Gibson (Guam) Camden Camacho	0	0
(Kiribati) Fakaofo Kaoa (Kiribati) Benjamin Kourabi	w/o
5	(Tonga) Ana Taminika (Tonga) Matavao Fanguana

Quarter-finals
1	(Papua New Guinea) Violet Apisah (Papua New Guinea) Matthew Stubbings	6	6
(Kiribati) Fakaofo Kaoa (Kiribati) Benjamin Kourabi	0	1

==== Section 2 ====
Round of 32
4	(Northern Mariana Islands) Isabel Heras (Northern Mariana Islands) Colin Sinclair	w/o
(Fiji) Grace Debalevu (Fiji) Storm Cornish
(Fiji) Ruby Coffin (Fiji) Sebastian Tikaram	6	6
(Vanuatu) Naomi Sipiti (Vanuatu) Noah Molbaleh	1	1
(Tonga) Peata Fatai (Tonga) Otufangavalu Noa	2	1
(Samoa) Mahinarangi Warren (Samoa) Kristen Pavitt	6	6
(Solomon Islands) Zorika Dalice Morgan (Solomon Islands) Junior Benjamin
8	(French Polynesia) Vaiani Dusserre-Valleaux (French Polynesia) Gillian Osmont	w/o

Round of 16
4	(Northern Mariana Islands) Isabel Heras (Northern Mariana Islands) Colin Sinclair	6	6
(Fiji) Ruby Coffin (Fiji) Sebastian Tikaram	0	1
(Samoa) Mahinarangi Warren (Samoa) Kristen Pavitt	4	6	[10]
8	(French Polynesia) Vaiani Dusserre-Valleaux (French Polynesia) Gillian Osmont	6	2	[4]

Quarter-finals
4	(Northern Mariana Islands) Isabel Heras (Northern Mariana Islands) Colin Sinclair	6	6
(Samoa) Mahinarangi Warren (Samoa) Kristen Pavitt	2	0

=== Bottom half ===
==== Section 3 ====
Round of 32
6	(Tonga) Ela Vakaukamea (Tonga) Semisi Fanguna	6	6
(Solomon Islands) Chrisma Jendy Au (Solomon Islands) Popai Leong	0	1
(Kiribati) Helen Ioera Atenati (Kiribati) Aato Boari Torua	3	2
(Northern Mariana Islands) Hyejin Irene Elliott (Northern Mariana Islands) Colin Nyle Ramsey	6	6
(French Polynesia) Kira Fong Loi (French Polynesia) Reynald Taaroa	4	6	[10]
(Papua New Guinea) Patricia Apisah (Papua New Guinea) Eddie Mera	6	1	6

Round of 16
6	(Tonga) Ela Vakaukamea (Tonga) Semisi Fanguna	6	6
(Northern Mariana Islands) Hyejin Irene Elliott (Northern Mariana Islands) Colin Nyle Ramsey	1	1
(French Polynesia) Kira Fong Loi (French Polynesia) Reynald Taaroa	2	4
3	(Fiji) Saoirse Breen (Fiji) William O'Connell	6	6

Quarter-finals
6	(Tonga) Ela Vakaukamea (Tonga) Semisi Fanguna	5	3
3	(Fiji) Saoirse Breen (Fiji) William O'Connell	7	6

==== Section 4 ====
Round of 32
7	(Samoa) Eleanor Schuster (Samoa) Leon So'Onalole	7	6
(Vanuatu) Lorraine Banimataku (Vanuatu) Zachary Sands	5	3
(Guam) Sydney Packbier (Guam) Aarman Sachdev	6	6
(Northern Mariana Islands) Serin Chung (Vanuatu) Bobby James Aguon Cruz	4	2
(French Polynesia) Mehetia Boosie (French Polynesia) Robert Chonvant	6	6
(Solomon Islands) Marion Hellen Gaote'E (Solomon Islands) Clivert Vakola	2	0

Round of 16
7	(Samoa) Eleanor Schuster (Samoa) Leon So'Onalole	6	6
(Guam) Sydney Packbier (Guam) Aarman Sachdev	4	1
(French Polynesia) Mehetia Boosie (French Polynesia) Robert Chonvant	1	1
2	(Papua New Guinea) Abigail Tere-Apisah (Papua New Guinea) Mark Gibbons	6	6

Quarter-finals
7	(Samoa) Eleanor Schuster (Samoa) Leon So'Onalole	4	1
2	(Papua New Guinea) Abigail Tere-Apisah (Papua New Guinea) Mark Gibbons	6	6
