= Tennis at the 2022 Pacific Mini Games – Team competition =

Sporting Event

Tennis team competition at the 2022 Pacific Mini Games
- Venue: American Memorial Park and Pacific Islands Club
- Dates: 16–18 June
- Competitors: 98 from 16 nations

The team competition for Tennis at the 2022 Pacific Mini Games took place at the American Memorial Park and Pacific Islands Club in Saipan, Northern Mariana Islands from 16 to 18 June 2022.

== Schedule ==
Date	16 June	17 June	18 June
Team competition	Pool matches	Pool matches	Semi-finals and Finals

== Men's team event ==
=== Group stage ===
Four groups were drawn for the men's event. With only fifteen teams entered, Group A consists of 3 teams while groups B, C, and D featured 4 teams. Each team played each other once with only the top ranked team of each group advancing through to the play-offs.

==== Group A ====
Pos.	Country	Ties	Matches	Sets	Sets %	Games	Games %
1	Northern Mariana Islands	2–0	5–0	10–0	100.0%	41–10	80.4%
2	Tonga	1–1	3–2	6–4	60.0%	32–23	58.2%
3	Kiribati	0–2	0–6	0–12	0.0%	8–48	14.3%

==== Group B ====
Pos.	Country	Ties	Matches	Sets	Sets %	Games	Games %
1	Vanuatu	3–0	8–1	10–2	83.3%	45–24	65.2%
2	Papua New Guinea	2–1	6–3	7–6	53.8%	41–36	53.2%
3	Guam	1–2	4–5	2–11	15.4%	23–49	31.9%
4	Nauru	0–3	0–9	0–0	0.0%	0–0	0.0%

==== Group C ====
Pos.	Country	Ties	Matches	Sets	Sets %	Games	Games %
1	Tahiti	3–0	8–1	14–3	82.4%	69–31	69.0%
2	New Caledonia	2–1	7–2	15–4	78.9%	74–37	66.7%
3	Cook Islands	0–2	0–6	0–10	0.0%	9–41	18.0%
4	Solomon Islands	0–2	0–6	0–12	0.0%	5–48	9.4%

==== Group D ====
Pos.	Country	Ties	Matches	Sets	Sets %	Games	Games %
1	Fiji	3–0	7–1	12–2	85.7%	56–24	70.0%
2	Tuvalu	2–1	5–3	10–7	58.8%	69–55	55.6%
3	Samoa	0–2	3–5	7–10	41.2%	51–59	46.4%
4	Federated States of Micronesia	0–2	1–7	2–12	14.3%	15–53	22.01%

=== Finals play-offs ===
The play-offs features only the winners of each group playing a semi-final round followed by the medal matches.

==== Semi-final 1 ====
Northern Mariana Islands
2
American Memorial Park - AMP 1
18 June 2022

Fiji
1

			1	2	3
1	(Northern Mariana Islands) (Fiji)	Colin Sinclair; William O'Connell	6; 1	6; 4
2	(Northern Mariana Islands) (Fiji)	Robert Schorr; Sebastian Tikaram	3; 6	1; 6
3	(Northern Mariana Islands) (Fiji)	Colin Sinclair / Robert Schorr; Sebastian Tikaram / William O'Connell	6; 1	6; 0

==== Semi-final 2 ====
French Polynesia
1
American Memorial Park - AMP 1
18 June 2022

Vanuatu
2

			1	2	3
1	(French Polynesia) (Vanuatu)	Gillian Osmont; Aymeric Mara	6; 2	6; 4
2	(French Polynesia) (Vanuatu)	Reynald Taaroa; Clément Mainguy	1; 6	2; 6
3	(French Polynesia) (Vanuatu)	Gillian Osmont / Reynald Taaroa; Aymeric Mara / Clément Mainguy	1; 6	3; 6

==== Bronze medal match ====
Fiji
1
American Memorial Park - AMP 1
18 June 2022

French Polynesia
2

			1	2	3
1	(Fiji) (French Polynesia)	William O'Connell; Gillian Osmont	0; 6	4; 6
2	(Fiji) (French Polynesia)	Sebastian Tikaram; Reynald Taaroa	3; 6	1; 6
3	(Fiji) (French Polynesia)	Sebastian Tikaram / William O'Connell; Gillian Osmont / Reynald Taaroa				not played

==== Gold medal match ====
Northern Mariana Islands
2
American Memorial Park - AMP 1
18 June 2022

Vanuatu
1

			1	2	3
1	(Northern Mariana Islands) (Vanuatu)	Colin Sinclair; Aymeric Mara	6; 0	6; 1
2	(Northern Mariana Islands) (Vanuatu)	Robert Schorr; Clément Mainguy	4; 6	0; 6
3	(Northern Mariana Islands) (Vanuatu)	Colin Sinclair / Robert Schorr; Aymeric Mara / Clément Mainguy	6; 0	6; 2

== Women's team event ==
=== Group stage ===
Three groups were drawn for the women's event. With only ten teams entered, Groups A and B consists of 3 teams each while group C featured 4 teams. Each team played each other once with only the top ranked team of each group plus the best ranked second placed team advancing through to the play-offs.

==== Group A ====
Pos.	Country	Ties	Matches	Sets	Sets %	Games	Games %
1	Papua New Guinea	2–0	6–0	12–0	100.0%	49–6	89.1%
2	Guam	1–1	2–4	4–8	33.3%	22–34	39.3%
3	Kiribati	0–2	1–5	2–10	16.7%	14–45	23.7%

==== Group B ====
Pos.	Country	Ties	Matches	Sets	Sets %	Games	Games %
1	Tonga	2–0	5–1	5–2	71.4%	25–14	64.1%
2	Vanuatu	1–2	4–2	2–5	28.6%	14–25	35.9%
3	Nauru	0–2	0–6	0–0	0%	0–0	0%

==== Group C ====
Pos.	Country	Ties	Matches	Sets	Sets %	Games	Games %
1	Fiji	3–0	8–1	16–4	80.0%	89–57	61.0%
2	Northern Mariana Islands	2–1	5–4	10–8	55.6%	66–59	52.8%
3	Tahiti	1–2	4–5	9–11	45.0%	72–68	51.4%
4	Solomon Islands	0–3	1–8	4–16	20.0%	35–78	31.0%

=== Finals play-offs ===
The play-offs features only the winners of each group playing a semi-final round folled by the medal matches.

==== Semi-final 1 ====
Papua New Guinea
2
American Memorial Park - AMP 1
18 June 2022

Northern Mariana Islands
1

			1	2	3
1	(Papua New Guinea) (Northern Mariana Islands)	Violet Apisah; Maria Isabel Heras	6; 1	6; 3
2	(Papua New Guinea) (Northern Mariana Islands)	Abigail Tere-Apisah; Asia Daisy Raulerson	6; 0	6; 1
3	(Papua New Guinea) (Northern Mariana Islands)	Abigail Tere-Apisah / Patricia Apisah; Maria Isabel Heras / Asia Daisy Raulerson	0; 1			w/o

==== Semi-final 2 ====
Fiji
2
American Memorial Park - AMP 1
18 June 2022

Tonga
1

			1	2	3
1	(Fiji) (Tonga)	Saoirse Breen; Ana Finau Tamanika	6; 4	6; 3
2	(Fiji) (Tonga)	Ruby Coffin; Ela Vakaukamea	4; 6	4; 6
3	(Fiji) (Tonga)	Saoirse Breen / Ruby Coffin; Ana Finau Tamanika / Ela Vakaukamea	4; 6	6; 4	[10] [5]

==== Bronze medal match ====
Northern Mariana Islands
1
American Memorial Park - AMP 1
18 June 2022

Tonga
2

			1	2	3
1	(Northern Mariana Islands) (Tonga)	Maria Isabel Heras; Ana Finau Tamanika	6; 4	6; 0
2	(Northern Mariana Islands) (Tonga)	Asia Daisy Raulerson; Ela Vakaukamea	6; 6	3; 6	4
3	(Northern Mariana Islands) (Tonga)	Maria Isabel Heras / Asia Daisy Raulerson; Ana Finau Tamanika / Ela Vakaukamea	3; 6	6^{9} 7^{11}

==== Gold medal match ====
Papua New Guinea
2
American Memorial Park - AMP 1
18 June 2022

Fiji
0

			1	2	3
1	(Papua New Guinea) (Fiji)	Violet Apisah; Saoirse Breen	6; 2	6; 1
2	(Papua New Guinea) (Fiji)	Abigail Tere-Apisah; Ruby Coffin	6; 0	6; 0
3	(Papua New Guinea) (Fiji)	Abigail Tere-Apisah / Violet Apisah; Saoirse Breen / Ruby Coffin				not played
