= Tennis at the 2022 Pacific Mini Games – Women's singles =

Women's singles at the 2022 Pacific Mini Games
- Venue: American Memorial Park and Pacific Islands Club
- Dates: 19–25 June
- Competitors: 29 from 10 nations

Medalists
gold medal	Violet Apisah	Papua New Guinea
silver medal	Abigail Tere-Apisah	Papua New Guinea
bronze medal	Saoirse Breen	Fiji

The women's singles tennis event at the 2022 Pacific Mini Games took place at the American Memorial Park and Pacific Islands Club in Saipan, Northern Mariana Islands from 19 to 25 June 2022.

It was an all Papua New Guinean final which saw the number one seed, Abigail Tere-Apisah, take on her niece and seed two, Violet Apisah. The final result saw Violet defeating Abigail, 6–1, 6–1, to win the gold medal in Women's Singles tennis at the 2022 Pacific Mini Games. In the bronze medal match, Fiji's Saoirse Breen defeated PNG's Patricia Apisah, 6–2, 6–2.

== Schedule ==
Date	19 June	20 June	21 June	22 June	23 June	24 June
Women's singles	Round of 32	Round of 16	Quarterfinals	—	Semifinals	Finals

== Seeds ==
All seeds per ATP rankings.

1. (Papua New Guinea) Abigail Tere-Apisah
2. (Papua New Guinea) Violet Apisah
3. (Fiji) Saoirse Breen
4. (Papua New Guinea) Patricia Apisah
5. (Samoa) Eleanor Schuster (quarter-final)
6. (Northern Mariana Islands) Isabel Heras (quarter-final)
7. (Vanuatu) Lorraine Banimataku (quarter-final)
8. (Tonga) Ana Taminika (first round)

Click on the seed number of a player to go to their draw section.

== Results ==
=== Finals ===
Quarterfinals
1	(Papua New Guinea) Abigail Tere-Apisah	6	6
7	(Vanuatu) Lorraine Banimataku	1	2
4	(Papua New Guinea) Patricia Apisah	6	6
(French Polynesia) Mehetia Boosie	3	3
6	(Northern Mariana Islands) Isabel Heras	0	2
3	(Fiji) Saoirse Breen	6	6
5	(Samoa) Eleanor Schuster	2	1
2	(Papua New Guinea) Violet Apisah	6	6

Semifinals
1	(Papua New Guinea) Abigail Tere-Apisah	6	6
4	(Papua New Guinea) Patricia Apisah	0	0
3	(Fiji) Saoirse Breen	4	3
2	(Papua New Guinea) Violet Apisah	6	6

Final
1	(Papua New Guinea) Abigail Tere-Apisah	1	1
2	(Papua New Guinea) Violet Apisah	6	6
Bronze medal
4	(Papua New Guinea) Patricia Apisah	2	2
3	(Fiji) Saoirse Breen	6	6

=== Top-half ===
==== Section 1 ====
Round of 32
1
8
(French Polynesia) J Ly	6
(Fiji) R Coffin	0
(Northern Mariana Islands) S Chung	6
(Kiribati) H I Atenati	4
(Solomon Islands) M H Gaote'E	0
7	(Vanuatu) L Banimataku	6

Round of 16
1	(Papua New Guinea) A Tere-Apisah	6
(Fiji) R Coffin	0
(Northern Mariana Islands) S Chung	2
7	(Vanuatu) L Banimataku	6

Quarter-finals
1	(Papua New Guinea) A Tere-Apisah	6
7	(Vanuatu) L Banimataku	1

==== Section 2 ====
Round of 32
4	(Papua New Guinea) P Apisah	4	7	6
(Samoa) M Warren	6	5	4
(Solomon Islands) Z D Morgan	6	6
(Fiji) G Debalevu	1	0
(French Polynesia) M Boosie	6	6
(Northern Mariana Islands) H I Elliott	2	1
(Guam) S Packbier	1	6	3
8	(Tonga) A Tamanika	6	1	1^{r}

Round of 16
4	(Papua New Guinea) P Apisah	4	6	6
(Solomon Islands) Z D Morgan	6	3	4
(French Polynesia) M Boosie	6	6
(Guam) S Packbier	1	1

Quarter-finals
4	(Papua New Guinea) P Apisah	6	6
(French Polynesia) M Boosie	3	3

=== Bottom-half ===
==== Section 3 ====
Round of 32
6	(Northern Mariana Islands) I Heras	6
(Kiribati) F Kaoa	2
(French Polynesia) V Dusserre-Valleaux	6
(Tonga) P Fatai	3
(Vanuatu) N Sipiti	7
(Solomon Islands) C V Collinson	5
3
6

Round of 16
6	(Northern Mariana Islands) I Heras	3
(French Polynesia) V Dusserre-Valleaux	6
(Vanuatu) N Sipiti	0
3	(Fiji) S Breen	6

Quarter-finals
6	(Northern Mariana Islands) I Heras	0
3	(Fiji) S Breen	6

==== Section 4 ====
Round of 32
4	(Samoa) E Schuster	7
(French Polynesia) K F Loi	5
(Guam) F Gibson	6
(Solomon Islands) C J Au	0
(Tonga) E Vakaukamea	1
(Northern Mariana Islands) A D Raulerson	6
3
6

Round of 16
4	(Samoa) E Schuster	6
(Guam) F Gibson	1
(Tonga) E Vakaukamea	1
2	(Papua New Guinea) V Apisah	6

Quarter-finals
4	(Samoa) E Schuster	2
2	(Papua New Guinea) V Apisah	6
