= Tennis at the 2022 Pacific Mini Games =

- Venue: American Memorial Park, Pacific Islands Club
- Location: Saipan, Northern Mariana Islands
- Dates: 16–24 June
- Competitors: 98 from 16 nations

The tennis competition at the 2022 Pacific Mini Games took place from 16 to 24 June 2022 at the American Memorial Park and Pacific Islands Club in Saipan, Northern Mariana Islands. Tennis along with only one other sport commenced a day before the official opening ceremony of the games.

== Participating nations ==
As of 1 June 2022, sixteen countries and territories have confirmed their participation in the games. Each Pacific Games association is allowed to enter a maximum of eight athletes, with no more than five of the same gender.

Pacific Games Associations
- Cook Islands (2)
- Federated States of Micronesia (3)
- Fiji (8)
- Guam (8)
- Kiribati (5)
- Nauru (8)
- New Caledonia (8)
- Northern Mariana Islands (8) (Host)
- Papua New Guinea (7)
- Samoa (7)
- Solomon Islands (8)
- Tahiti (8)
- Tonga (6)
- Tuvalu (3)
- Vanuatu (7)
- Wallis and Futuna (3)

== Medal summary ==
=== Medal table ===
* Host nation (Northern Mariana Islands)

Rank	Nation	Gold	Silver	Bronze	Total
1	Papua New Guinea	4	2	0	6
2	Northern Mariana Islands*	3	0	1	4
3	Fiji	0	3	2	5
4	Vanuatu	0	2	0	2
5	Tonga	0	0	2	2
6	French Polynesia	0	0	1	1
6	Guam	0	0	1	1
Totals (7 entries)		7	7	7	21

=== Medal events ===
Event	Gold	Silver	Bronze
Men's singles	Colin Sinclair; Northern Mariana Islands	Matthew Stubbings; Papua New Guinea	William O'Connell; Fiji
Men's doubles	Northern Mariana Islands; Colin Sinclair; Robert Schorr	Vanuatu; Aymeric Mara; Clement Mainguy	Guam; Aarman Sachdev; Camden Camacho
Men's team	Northern Mariana Islands; Colin Sinclair; Robert Schorr; Colin Ramsey; Bobby James Aguon Cruz	Vanuatu; Aymeric Mara; Clément Mainguy; Zachary Sands; Noah Molbaleh	French Polynesia; Patrice Cotti; Heimanarii Lai San; Gillian Osmont; Reynald Taaroa; Robert Chonvant
Women's singles	Violet Apisah; Papua New Guinea	Abigail Tere-Apisah; Papua New Guinea	Saoirse Breen; Fiji
Women's doubles	Papua New Guinea; Patricia Apisah; Violet Apisah	Fiji; Ruby Coffin; Saoirse Breen	Tonga; Ana Tamanika; Ela Vakaukamea
Women's team	Papua New Guinea; Violet Apisah; Abigail Tere-Apisah; Patricia Apisah	Fiji; Saoirse Breen; Ruby Coffin; Grace Debalevu	Tonga; Ana Tamanika; Ela Vakaukamea; Peata Fatai; Uaealesi Funaki
Mixed doubles	Papua New Guinea; Violet Apisah; Matthew Stubbings	Fiji; Saoirse Breen; William O'Connell	Northern Mariana Islands; Isabel Heras; Colin Sinclair
