= Tennis at the 2022 Pacific Mini Games – Women's doubles =

Women's doubles at the 2022 Pacific Mini Games
- Venue: American Memorial Park and Pacific Islands Club
- Dates: 19–25 June
- Competitors: 13 from 10 nations

Medalists
gold medal	Patricia Apisah; Violet Apisah	Papua New Guinea
silver medal	Ruby Coffin; Saoirse Breen	Fiji
bronze medal	Ana Taminika; Ela Vakaukamea	Tonga

The women's doubles tennis event at the 2022 Pacific Mini Games took place at the American Memorial Park and Pacific Islands Club in Saipan, Northern Mariana Islands from 19 to 25 June 2022.

== Schedule ==
Date	20 June	21 June	22 June	23 June	24 June
Women's doubles	Round of 16	—	Quarterfinals	Semifinals	Finals

== Seeds ==
1. (Papua New Guinea) Patricia Apisah / (Papua New Guinea) Violet Apisah
2. (Fiji) Ruby Coffin / (Fiji) Saoirse Breen
3. (Tonga) Ana Taminika / (Tonga) Ela Vakaukamea
4. (Northern Mariana Islands) Asia Daisy Raulerson / (Northern Mariana Islands) Isabel Heras

== Results ==
=== Draw ===
First round
(Northern Mariana Islands) Hyejin Irene Elliott (Northern Mariana Islands) Serin Chung	3	2
(Guam) Fremont Gibson (Guam) Sydney Packbier	6	6
(Solomon Islands) Chrisma Jendy Au (Solomon Islands) Marion Hellen Gaote'E	0	2
(French Polynesia) Jennifer Ly (French Polynesia) Kira Fong Loi	6	6
(Samoa) Eleanor Schuster (Samoa) Mahinarangi Warren	6	6
(Vanuatu) Lorraine Banimataku (Vanuatu) Naomi Sipiti	3	3
(French Polynesia) Mehetia Boosie (French Polynesia) Vaiani Dusserre-Valleaux	4	1
4	(Northern Mariana Islands) Asia Daisy Raulerson (Northern Mariana Islands) Isabel Heras	6	6
(Solomon Islands) Chloe Vazeriko Collinson (Solomon Islands) Zorika Dalice Morgan	6	6
(Kiribati) Fakaofo Kaoa (Kiribati) Helen Ioera Atenati	2	4

Quarterfinals
1	(Papua New Guinea) Patricia Apisah (Papua New Guinea) Violet Apisah	6	6
(Guam) Fremont Gibson (Guam) Sydney Packbier	2	0
3	(Tonga) Ana Taminika (Tonga) Ela Vakaukamea	6	6
(French Polynesia) Jennifer Ly (French Polynesia) Kira Fong Loi	1	1
(Samoa) Eleanor Schuster (Samoa) Mahinarangi Warren	0	3
4	(Northern Mariana Islands) Asia Daisy Raulerson (Northern Mariana Islands) Isabel Heras	6	6
(Solomon Islands) Chloe Vazeriko Collinson (Solomon Islands) Zorika Dalice Morgan	1	1
2	(Fiji) Ruby Coffin (Fiji) Saoirse Breen	6	6

Semifinals
1	(Papua New Guinea) Patricia Apisah (Papua New Guinea) Violet Apisah	5	6	10
3	(Tonga) Ana Taminika (Tonga) Ela Vakaukamea	7	0	7
4	(Northern Mariana Islands) Asia Daisy Raulerson (Northern Mariana Islands) Isabel Heras	3	6	8
2	(Fiji) Ruby Coffin (Fiji) Saoirse Breen	6	4	10

Final
1	(Papua New Guinea) Patricia Apisah (Papua New Guinea) Violet Apisah	6	6
2	(Fiji) Ruby Coffin (Fiji) Saoirse Breen	1	0
