= 2018 Australian Open – Girls' singles =

Girls' singles
- 2018 Australian Open

Final
- Champion: (Chinese Taipei) Liang En-shuo
- Runner-up: (France) Clara Burel
- Score: 6–3, 6–4

Events
Singles	men	women		boys	girls
Doubles	men	women	mixed	boys	girls
WC Singles	men	women	quad
WC Doubles	men	women	quad
Legends	men	women	mixed
- Australian Open

Liang En-shuo won the girls' singles title at the 2018 Australian Open, defeating Clara Burel in the final, 6–3, 6–4.

Marta Kostyuk was the defending champion, but withdrew as she was still competing in the women's tournament.

== Seeds ==
1. (China) Wang Xinyu (semifinals)
2. (Chinese Taipei) Liang En-shuo (champion)
3. (Switzerland) Simona Waltert (first round)
4. (Argentina) María Lourdes Carlé (first round)
5. (Japan) Naho Sato (quarterfinals)
6. (Chinese Taipei) Joanna Garland (second round)
7. (United States) Alexa Noel (third round)
8. (Slovenia) Nika Radišić (first round)
9. (China) Wang Xiyu (quarterfinals)
10. (Switzerland) Lulu Sun (third round)
11. (Japan) Yuki Naito (second round)
12. (United States) Elysia Bolton (third round)
13. (Latvia) Daniela Vismane (quarterfinals)
14. (China) Zheng Qinwen (first round)
15. (France) Yasmine Mansouri (first round)
16. (Russia) Kamilla Rakhimova (third round)

== Draw ==
Key

- Q = Qualifier
- WC = Wild card
- LL = Lucky loser
- Alt = Alternate
- ITF = ITF entry
- PR = Protected ranking
- SR = Special ranking
- SE = Special exempt
- JE = Junior exempt
- JR = Junior Accelerator Programme entrant
- CO = College Accelerator Programme entrant
- NG = Next Gen Accelerator Program entrant
- w/o = Walkover
- r = Retired
- d = Defaulted

=== Finals ===
Quarterfinals
1	(China) Wang Xinyu	5	6	6
5	(Japan) Naho Sato	7	3	3
(United States) Dalayna Hewitt	6^{4}	2
(France) Clara Burel	7^{7}	6
(Italy) Elisabetta Cocciaretto	6	6
13	(Latvia) Daniela Vismane	3	4
9	(China) Wang Xiyu	4	6	3
2	(Chinese Taipei) Liang En-shuo	6	4	6

Semifinals
1	(China) Wang Xinyu	6	1	0
(France) Clara Burel	2	6	6
(Italy) Elisabetta Cocciaretto	6	3	6^{5}
2	(Chinese Taipei) Liang En-shuo	4	6	7^{7}

Final
(France) Clara Burel	3	4
2	(Chinese Taipei) Liang En-shuo	6	6

=== Top half ===
==== Section 1 ====
First round
1	(China) Wang Xinyu	6	6
Q	(Japan) Sakura Hosogi	1	4
(United States) Peyton Stearns	6	6^{6}	7^{9}
(Bulgaria) Gergana Topalova	1	7^{8}	6^{7}
(South Korea) Park So-hyun	4	3
(Ukraine) Viktoriia Dema	6	6
(Thailand) Mananchaya Sawangkaew	6	6
15	(France) Yasmine Mansouri	2	1
10	(Switzerland) Lulu Sun	6	6
(Serbia) Draginja Vuković	4	3
LL	(South Africa) Myah Petchey	0	1
(United States) Nicole Mossmer	6	6
WC	(Australia) Annerly Poulos	6	7^{11}
(Poland) Ania Hertel	2	6^{9}
(United Kingdom) Gemma Heath	6	2	2
5	(Japan) Naho Sato	3	6	6

Second round
1	(China) Xin Wang	6	5	6
(United States) P Stearns	3	7	4
(Ukraine) V Dema	3	4
(Thailand) M Sawangkaew	6	6
10	(Switzerland) L Sun	6	6
(United States) N Mossmer	2	2
WC	(Australia) A Poulos	2	1
5	(Japan) N Sato	6	6

Third round
1	(China) Xin Wang	6	4	6
(Thailand) M Sawangkaew	4	6	2
10	(Switzerland) L Sun	6^{5}	7^{7}	1
5	(Japan) N Sato	7^{7}	6^{5}	6

Quarterfinals
1	(China) Xin Wang	5	6	6
5	(Japan) N Sato	7	3	3

==== Section 2 ====
First round
4	(Argentina) María Lourdes Carlé	6^{5}	4
(United States) Dalayna Hewitt	7^{7}	6
(Burundi) Sada Nahimana	6^{0}	6	2
Q	(Japan) Moyuka Uchijima	7^{7}	4	6
Q	(Denmark) Hannah Viller Møller	6	1	4
(Russia) Alina Charaeva	4	6	6
WC	(Australia) Amber Marshall	6	7^{8}
14	(China) Zheng Qinwen	1	6^{6}
12	(United States) Elysia Bolton	4	6	6
WC	(Australia) Ivana Popovic	6	3	4
(Finland) Oona Orpana	6	3	3
(Japan) Himari Sato	2	6	6
(France) Clara Burel	6	6
(Georgia (country)) Ana Makatsaria	2	3
Q	(India) Akanksha Bhan	6^{2}	0
6	(Chinese Taipei) Joanna Garland	7^{7}	6

Second round
(United States) D Hewitt	6	6
Q	(Japan) M Uchijima	3	3
(Russia) A Charaeva	2	4
WC	(Australia) A Marshall	6	6
12	(United States) E Bolton	6	6
(Japan) H Sato	4	1
(France) C Burel	6	6
6	(Chinese Taipei) J Garland	3	1

Third round
(United States) D Hewitt	7	6
WC	(Australia) A Marshall	5	2
12	(United States) E Bolton	7^{7}	6^{5}	4
(France) C Burel	6^{1}	7^{7}	6

Quarterfinals
(United States) D Hewitt	6^{4}	2
(France) C Burel	7^{7}	6

=== Bottom half ===
==== Section 3 ====
First round
8	(Slovenia) Nika Radišič	2	3
WC	(Australia) Gabriella Da Silva-Fick	6	6
(Italy) Elisabetta Cocciaretto	2	6	6
(United States) Coco Gauff	6	2	2
(Morocco) Diae El Jardi	5	3
Q	(Hong Kong) Cody Wong Hong-yi	7	6
(Czech Republic) Karolína Beránková	2	4
11	(Japan) Yuki Naito	6	6
13	(Latvia) Daniela Vismane	6	6
Q	(United States) Niluka Madurawe	3	4
(France) Loudmilla Bencheikh	6	6
WC	(China) Tang Qianhui	1	4
(Russia) Daria Frayman	7	6
WC	(Australia) Zara Brankovic	5	2
Q	(Japan) Himeno Sakatsume	6	6
3	(Switzerland) Simona Waltert	4	2

Second round
WC	(Australia) G Da Silva-Fick	4	2
(Italy) E Cocciaretto	6	6
Q	(Hong Kong) CH-y Wong	4	6	6
11	(Japan) Y Naito	6	4	0
13	(Latvia) D Vismane	6	6
(France) L Bencheikh	4	3
(Russia) D Frayman	6	6
Q	(Japan) H Sakatsume	1	3

Third round
(Italy) E Cocciaretto	6	6
Q	(Hong Kong) CH-y Wong	4	2
13	(Latvia) D Vismane	3	6	6
(Russia) D Frayman	6	3	2

Quarterfinals
(Italy) E Cocciaretto	6	6
13	(Latvia) D Vismane	3	4

==== Section 4 ====
First round
7	(United States) Alexa Noel	7^{7}	6
(Poland) Stefania Rogozińska Dzik	6^{1}	1
(Georgia (country)) Mariam Dalakishvili	6	3	6
WC	(Australia) Megan Smith	2	6	3
(Canada) Layne Sleeth	2	1
(Japan) Mana Kawamura	6	6
(Papua New Guinea) Violet Apisah	3	6	3
9	(China) Wang Xiyu	6	3	6
16	(Russia) Kamilla Rakhimova	6	6
(United Kingdom) Ali Collins	2	2
(Slovakia) Viktória Morvayová	6	6
(United States) Hurricane Tyra Black	4	2
Q	(Japan) Anri Nagata	6^{6}	7^{7}	7^{10}
(France) Diane Parry	7^{8}	6^{3}	6^{8}
WC	(Australia) Olivia Gadecki	6	3	6^{3}
2	(Chinese Taipei) Liang En-shuo	3	6	7^{7}

Second round
7	(United States) A Noel	6	6
(Georgia (country)) M Dalakishvili	2	0
(Japan) M Kawamura	1	3
9	(China) Xiy Wang	6	6
16	(Russia) K Rakhimova	6	6
(Slovakia) V Morvayová	0	2
Q	(Japan) A Nagata	2	1
2	(Chinese Taipei) E-s Liang	6	6

Third round
7	(United States) A Noel	3	5
9	(China) Xiy Wang	6	7
16	(Russia) K Rakhimova	6	4	4
2	(Chinese Taipei) E-s Liang	2	6	6

Quarterfinals
9	(China) Xiy Wang	4	6	3
2	(Chinese Taipei) E-s Liang	6	4	6

== Qualifying ==
=== Seeds ===
1. (New Zealand) Valentina Ivanov (qualifying competition)
2. (Japan) Sakura Hosogi (qualified)
3. (Japan) Anri Nagata (qualified)
4. (Japan) Ayumi Miyamoto (first round)
5. (China) Wang Jiaqi (qualifying competition)
6. (United States) Niluka Madurawe (qualified)
7. (Japan) Moyuka Uchijima (qualified)
8. (Japan) Rina Saigo (qualifying competition)
9. (France) Giulia Morlet (first round)
10. (India) Akanksha Bhan (qualified)
11. (Italy) Lisa Piccinetti (qualifying competition, retired)
12. (Georgia (country)) Zoziya Kardava (first round)
13. (Sweden) Melis Yasar (first round)
14. (Hong Kong) Cody Wong Hong-yi (qualified)
15. (Japan) Funa Kozaki (qualifying competition)
16. (Denmark) Hannah Viller Møller (qualified)

=== Qualifiers ===
1. (Hong Kong) Cody Wong Hong-yi
2. (Japan) Sakura Hosogi
3. (Japan) Anri Nagata
4. (Denmark) Hannah Viller Møller
5. (Japan) Himeno Sakatsume
6. (United States) Niluka Madurawe
7. (Japan) Moyuka Uchijima
8. (India) Akanksha Bhan

=== Lucky loser ===
1. (South Africa) Myah Petchey

=== Draw ===
==== First qualifier ====
First round
1	(New Zealand) Valentina Ivanov	6	5	6
(Chinese Taipei) Lee Kuan-yi	2	7	4
(Japan) Yuki Ando	3	5
14	(Hong Kong) Cody Wong Hong-yi	6	7

Qualifying competition
1	(New Zealand) Valentina Ivanov	6	3	3
14	(Hong Kong) Cody Wong Hong-yi	4	6	6

==== Second qualifier ====
First round
2	(Japan) Sakura Hosogi	6	6
WC	(Australia) Tina Nadine Smith	2	0
(Northern Mariana Islands) Carol Young Suh Lee	6	1	0
11	(Italy) Lisa Piccinetti	3	6	6

Qualifying competition
2	(Japan) Sakura Hosogi	6	2
11	(Italy) Lisa Piccinetti	0	0^{r}

==== Third qualifier ====
First round
3	(Japan) Anri Nagata	6	7
WC	(Australia) Anastasia Berezov	0	5
(South Africa) Myah Petchey	6	6
9	(France) Giulia Morlet	3	4

Qualifying competition
3	(Japan) Anri Nagata	7	7
(South Africa) Myah Petchey	5	5

==== Fourth qualifier ====
First round
4	(Japan) Ayumi Miyamoto	2	3
(United States) Dakota Fordham	6	6
WC	(Australia) Tallulah Farrow	5	4
16	(Denmark) Hannah Viller Møller	7	6

Qualifying competition
(United States) Dakota Fordham	5	4
16	(Denmark) Hannah Viller Møller	7	6

==== Fifth qualifier ====
First round
5	(China) Wang Jiaqi	1	6	6
WC	(Australia) Cyan Sun	6	4	3
(Japan) Himeno Sakatsume	6	6
13	(Sweden) Melis Yasar	3	2

Qualifying competition
5	(China) Wang Jiaqi	5	6	0
(Japan) Himeno Sakatsume	7	4	6

==== Sixth qualifier ====
First round
6	(United States) Niluka Madurawe	6	6
WC	(Australia) Helena Spiridis	3	1
WC	(Malaysia) Sara Nayar	6	6^{3}	3
15	(Japan) Funa Kozaki	1	7^{7}	6

Qualifying competition
6	(United States) Niluka Madurawe	6	6
15	(Japan) Funa Kozaki	3	2

==== Seventh qualifier ====
First round
7	(Japan) Moyuka Uchijima	6	6
(Slovenia) Kristina Novak	4	1
(Serbia) Anđela Skrobonja	6	3	7^{8}
12	(Georgia (country)) Zoziya Kardava	2	6	6^{6}

Qualifying competition
7	(Japan) Moyuka Uchijima	6	6
(Serbia) Anđela Skrobonja	4	0

==== Eighth qualifier ====
First round
8	(Japan) Rina Saigo	6	6
(Switzerland) Fiona Ganz	1	4
(Australia) Lisa Mays	3	6	1
10	(India) Akanksha Bhan	6	3	6

Qualifying competition
8	(Japan) Rina Saigo	2	4
10	(India) Akanksha Bhan	6	6
