= Tennis at the 2023 Pacific Games – Mixed doubles =

Mixed doubles at the 2023 Pacific Games
- Venue: National Tennis Center
- Dates: 22–29 November

Medalists
gold medal	Abigail Tere-Apisah; Matthew Stubbings	Papua New Guinea
silver medal	Mehitia Boosie; Antoine Voisin	Tahiti
bronze medal	Tarani Kamoe; William O'Connell	Fiji

The mixed doubles tennis event at the 2023 Pacific Games took place at the National Tennis Center in Honiara, Solomon Islands from 22 to 29 November 2023.

== Schedule ==
Date	22 November	23 November	24 November	25 November	26 November	27 November	28 November	29 November
Mixed doubles	Round of 64	Round of 32		Round of 16	Rest day	Quarterfinals	Semifinals	Finals

== Seeds ==
All seeds per ATP rankings.

1. (Papua New Guinea) Abigail Tere-Apisah / (Papua New Guinea) Matthew Stubbings (champions, gold medalists)
2. (Samoa) Annerly Georgopoulos / (Samoa) Leon Soonalole (semifinals, fourth place)
3. (Fiji) Tarani Kamoe / (Fiji) William O'Connell (semifinals, bronze medalists)
4. (French Polynesia) Mehitia Boosie / (French Polynesia) Antoine Voisin (finals, silver medalists)
5. (Guam) Freemont Gibson / (Guam) Camden Camacho (second round)
6. (Samoa) Eleanor Schuster / (Samoa) Marvin Soonalole (quarterfinals)
7. (Guam) Sydney Packbier / (Guam) Mason Caldwell (third round)
8. (Solomon Islands) Georgimah Row / (Solomon Islands) Junior Michael Miki (quarterfinals)

== Draw ==
=== Finals ===
Quarterfinals
1	(Papua New Guinea) Abigail Tere-Apisah (Papua New Guinea) Matthew Stubbings	6	6
6	(Samoa) Eleanor Schuster (Samoa) Marvin Soonalole	1	3
3	(Fiji) Tarani Kamoe (Fiji) William O'Connell	6	6
(Cook Islands) Lilian Maui (Cook Islands) Jason Pierre	1	2
8	(Solomon Islands) Georgimah Row (Solomon Islands) Junior Michael Miki	2	3
4	(French Polynesia) Mehitia Boosie (French Polynesia) Antoine Voisin	6	6
(Cook Islands) Norah Browne (Cook Islands) Sebastian Payne	1	0
2	(Samoa) Annerly Georgopoulos (Samoa) Leon Soonalole	6	6

Semifinals
1	(Papua New Guinea) Abigail Tere-Apisah (Papua New Guinea) Matthew Stubbings	6	6
3	(Fiji) Tarani Kamoe (Fiji) William O'Connell	4	3
4	(French Polynesia) Mehitia Boosie (French Polynesia) Antoine Voisin	6	1	6
2	(Samoa) Annerly Georgopoulos (Samoa) Leon Soonalole	2	6	3

Final
1	(Papua New Guinea) Abigail Tere-Apisah (Papua New Guinea) Matthew Stubbings	6	6
4	(French Polynesia) Mehitia Boosie (French Polynesia) Antoine Voisin	3	0
Bronze medal
3	(Fiji) Tarani Kamoe (Fiji) William O'Connell	6	3	11
2	(Samoa) Annerly Georgopoulos (Samoa) Leon Soonalole	4	6	9

=== Top-half ===
==== Section 1 ====
First Round			Second Round				Third Round
			1	(Papua New Guinea) Abigail Tere-Apisah (Papua New Guinea) Matthew Stubbings	6	6
(Tuvalu) Faolina Haleti (Tuvalu) Heimanarii Laisan	6	6		(Tuvalu) Faolina Haleti (Tuvalu) Heimanarii Laisan	0	2
(Cook Islands) Katee Wearing (Cook Islands) Luke Pierre	1	4					1	(Papua New Guinea) Abigail Tere-Apisah (Papua New Guinea) Matthew Stubbings	6	7
								(French Polynesia) Tavero Chung (French Polynesia) Heimanarii Laisan	1	5
			(Fiji) Sina Izumi (Fiji) Amit Lal		1	0
			(French Polynesia) Tavero Chung (French Polynesia) Heimanarii Laisan		6	6

==== Section 2 ====
First Round	Second Round				Third Round
	(Tonga) Sisilia Teu (Tonga) Otufangavalu Noa		6	6
	(Nauru) Tsitsi Edwinkalin (Nauru) Scotty Mikio		0	0
						(Tonga) Sisilia Teu (Tonga) Otufangavalu Noa	3	2
					6	(Samoa) Eleanor Schuster (Samoa) Marvin Soonalole	6	6
		(Solomon Islands) Philia Waita (Solomon Islands) Lachlan Guba	1	0
	6	(Samoa) Eleanor Schuster (Samoa) Marvin Soonalole	6	6

==== Section 3 ====
First Round	Second Round				Third Round
	3	(Fiji) Tarani Kamoe (Fiji) William O'Connell	6	6
		(French Polynesia) Mia Shan (French Polynesia) Reynald Taaroa	2	2
					3	(Fiji) Tarani Kamoe (Fiji) William O'Connell	6	6
						(Solomon Islands) Zorika Morgan (Solomon Islands) Samuel Ramoni	4	2
	(Solomon Islands) Zorika Morgan (Solomon Islands) Samuel Ramoni		6	6
	(Samoa) Mahinarangi Warren (Samoa) Darius Carruthers		1	1

==== Section 4 ====
First Round	Second Round				Third Round
	(Vanuatu) Ashanti Ligo (Vanuatu) Jean Andre		2	1
	(Cook Islands) Lilian Maui (Cook Islands) Jason Pierre		6	6
						(Cook Islands) Lilian Maui (Cook Islands) Jason Pierre	7	6
					7	(Guam) Sydney Packbier (Guam) Mason Caldwell	5	2
		(Papua New Guinea) Namet Sanewai (Papua New Guinea) Christopher Kaiuolo
	7	(Guam) Sydney Packbier (Guam) Mason Caldwell

=== Bottom-half ===
==== Section 5 ====
First Round	Second Round				Third Round
	8	(Solomon Islands) Georgimah Row (Solomon Islands) Junior Michael Miki	6	6
		(Fiji) Josephine Debalevu (Fiji) Raynal Singh	2	0
					8	(Solomon Islands) Georgimah Row (Solomon Islands) Junior Michael Miki	4	6	15
						(Vanuatu) Lorraine Banimataku (Vanuatu) Zachary Sands	6	4	13
	(Vanuatu) Lorraine Banimataku (Vanuatu) Zachary Sands		6	6
	(Guam) Leila Mercado (Guam) Aarman Sachdev		0	3

==== Section 6 ====
First Round	Second Round				Third Round
	(Nauru) Itaia Nigelita (Nauru) Nigel Kanano		2	0
	(Papua New Guinea) Michaela Mesa (Papua New Guinea) Eddie Mera		6	6
						(Papua New Guinea) Michaela Mesa (Papua New Guinea) Eddie Mera	1	0
					4	(French Polynesia) Mehitia Boosie (French Polynesia) Antoine Voisin	6	6
		(Samoa) Noelleda Ah San (Samoa) Faafetai Pritchard	1	3
	4	(French Polynesia) Mehitia Boosie (French Polynesia) Antoine Voisin	6	6

==== Section 7 ====
First Round	Second Round					Third Round
	5	(Guam) Freemont Gibson (Guam) Camden Camacho	6	4	5
		(Cook Islands) Norah Browne (Cook Islands) Sebastian Payne	2	6	10
						(Cook Islands) Norah Browne (Cook Islands) Sebastian Payne
						(Tonga) Ela Vakaukamea (Tonga) Filipe Huni
	(Tonga) Ela Vakaukamea (Tonga) Filipe Huni		7	6
	(Papua New Guinea) Pauline Hyun (Papua New Guinea) Mark Gibbons		5	3

==== Section 8 ====
First Round				Second Round				Third Round
				(French Polynesia) Jennifer Ly (French Polynesia) Heve Kelley		6	6
				(Fiji) Ruby Coffin (Fiji) Charles Cornish		3	2
									(French Polynesia) Jennifer Ly (French Polynesia) Heve Kelley	3	2
(Solomon Islands) Vinda Teally (Solomon Islands) Pyongil Justus	6	5	4					2	(Samoa) Annerly Georgopoulos (Samoa) Leon Soonalole	6	6
(Vanuatu) Abygail Coeuillet (Vanuatu) Fintan Molbaleh	0	7	10		(Vanuatu) Abygail Coeuillet (Vanuatu) Fintan Molbaleh	2	1
				2	(Samoa) Annerly Georgopoulos (Samoa) Leon Soonalole	6	6
