= Tennis at the 2023 Pacific Games – Women's singles =

Women's singles at the 2023 Pacific Games
- Venue: National Tennis Center
- Dates: 22–30 November
- Competitors: 35 from 10 nations

Medalists
gold medal	Abigail Tere-Apisah	Papua New Guinea
silver medal	Annerly Georgopoulos	Samoa
bronze medal	Eleanor Schuster	Samoa

The women's singles tennis event at the 2023 Pacific Games took place at the National Tennis Center in Honiara, Solomon Islands from 22 to 30 November 2023.

== Schedule ==
Date	22 November	23 November	24 November	25 November	26 November	27 November	28 November	29 November	30 November
Women's singles	Round of 64	Round of 32		Round of 16	Rest day	Quarterfinals		Semifinals	Finals

== Seeds ==
All seeds per ATP rankings.

1. (Papua New Guinea) Abigail Tere-Apisah (champion, gold medalist)
2. (Samoa) Annerly Georgopoulos (finals, silver medalist)
3. (French Polynesia) Mehitia Boosie (quarterfinals)
4. (Solomon Islands) Georgimah Row (quarterfinals)
5. (Fiji) Tarani Kamoe (quarterfinals)
6. (Samoa) Eleanor Schuster (semifinals, bronze medalist)
7. (Guam) Freemont Gibson (quarterfinals)
8. (Solomon Islands) Zorika Morgan (semifinals, fourth place)

== Draw ==
=== Finals ===
Quarterfinals
1	(Papua New Guinea) Abigail Tere-Apisah	6	6
5	(Fiji) Tarani Kamoe	2	1
4	(Solomon Islands) Georgimah Row	1	0
6	(Samoa) Eleanor Schuster	6	6
8	(Solomon Islands) Zorika Morgan	3	6	6
3	(French Polynesia) Mehitia Boosie	6	3	3
7	(Guam) Freemont Gibson	1	4
2	(Samoa) Annerly Georgopoulos	6	6

Semifinals
1	(Papua New Guinea) Abigail Tere-Apisah	6	7^{7}
6	(Samoa) Eleanor Schuster	0	6^{0}
8	(Solomon Islands) Zorika Morgan	2	4
2	(Samoa) Annerly Georgopoulos	6	6

Final
1	(Papua New Guinea) Abigail Tere-Apisah	7	6
2	(Samoa) Annerly Georgopoulos	5	1
Bronze medal
6	(Samoa) Eleanor Schuster	3	6	7^{7}
8	(Solomon Islands) Zorika Morgan	6	1	6^{1}

=== Top-half ===
==== Section 1 ====
First Round			Second Round				Third Round
			1	(Papua New Guinea) A Tere-Apisah	6	6
(Samoa) N Ah San	6	6		(Samoa) N Ah San	0	3
(Guam) L Mercado	1	2					1	(Papua New Guinea) A Tere-Apisah	6	6
								(Solomon Islands) V Teally	1	0
			(Cook Islands) H Ellingham		4	3
			(Solomon Islands) V Teally		6	6

==== Section 2 ====
First Round	Second Round				Third Round
	(French Polynesia) J Ly		6	6
	(Nauru) T Edwinkalin		1	0
						(French Polynesia) J Ly	3	2
					5	(Fiji) T Kamoe	6	6
		(Vanuatu) A Ligo	0	0
	5	(Fiji) T Kamoe	6	6

==== Section 3 ====
First Round	Second Round				Third Round
	4	(Solomon Islands) G Row	6	6
		(Vanuatu) A Coeuillet	0	2
					4	(Solomon Islands) G Row	6	6
						(Cook Islands) N Browne	2	2
	(Fiji) S Izumi		4	1
	(Cook Islands) N Browne		6	6

==== Section 4 ====
First Round	Second Round				Third Round
	(French Polynesia) M Shan		7	6
	(Papua New Guinea) M Mesa		5	0
						(French Polynesia) M Shan	4	1
					6	(Samoa) E Schuster	6	6
		(Tonga) S Teu	2	1
	6	(Samoa) E Schuster	6	6

=== Bottom-half ===
==== Section 5 ====
First Round	Second Round					Third Round
	8	(Solomon Islands) Z Morgan	6	6
		(Papua New Guinea) P Hyun	1	0
						8	(Solomon Islands) Z Morgan	6	6
							(Samoa) M Warren	3	0
	(Cook Islands) K Wearing		6	1	2
	(Samoa) M Warren		3	6	6

==== Section 6 ====
First Round					Second Round					Third Round
					(Tuvalu) S Tealei		6	2	3
					(Tonga) E Vakaukamea		2	6	6
											(Tonga) E Vakaukamea	2	1
8	(Guam) S Packbier	7	1	0						3	(French Polynesia) M Boosie	6	6
	(Fiji) J Debalevu	5	6	6		(Fiji) J Debalevu	3	1
					3	(French Polynesia) M Boosie	6	6

==== Section 7 ====
First Round	Second Round				Third Round
	7	(Guam) F Gibson	6	6
		(Papua New Guinea) N Sanewai	1	0
					7	(Guam) F Gibson	6	7^{7}
						(Fiji) R Coffin	1	6^{3}
	(Solomon Islands) P Waita		2	2
	(Fiji) R Coffin		6	6

==== Section 8 ====
First Round			Second Round				Third Round
			(Cook Islands) L Maui		4	1
			(Vanuatu) L Banimataku		6	6
								(Vanuatu) L Banimataku	2	1
(Nauru) I Nigelita	0	0					2	(Samoa) A Georgopoulos	6	6
(French Polynesia) T Chung	6	6		(French Polynesia) T Chung	2	1
			2	(Samoa) A Georgopoulos	6	6
