= Tennis at the 2015 Pacific Games =

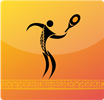
- Tennis pictogram for the Games
- Venue: Port Moresby Racquets Club, Port Moresby
- Dates: 6–17 July
- Competitors: 84 from 14 nations

The tennis competition at the 2015 Pacific Games was held from 6 to 17 July 2015 at the Port Moresby Racquets Club in Port Moresby, Papua New Guinea.

== Participating nations ==
Fourteen countries and territories participated in the games.Each Pacific Games association was allowed to enter a maximum of eight athletes, with no more than five of the same gender.

Pacific Games Associations
- American Samoa (7)
- Federated States of Micronesia (1)
- Fiji (9)
- Guam (4)
- Kiribati (3)
- Nauru (4)
- New Caledonia (9)
- Papua New Guinea (8) (Host)
- Samoa (7)
- Solomon Islands (8)
- Tahiti (9)
- Tonga (6)
- Tuvalu (4)
- Vanuatu (5)

== Medal summary ==
=== Medal table ===
* Host nation (Papua New Guinea)

Rank	Nation	Gold	Silver	Bronze	Total
1	Papua New Guinea*	4	2	0	6
2	New Caledonia	3	3	2	8
3	Vanuatu	0	2	1	3
4	Tahiti	0	0	3	3
5	Fiji	0	0	1	1
Totals (5 entries)		7	7	7	21

=== Men's ===
Event	Gold	Silver	Bronze	Refs
Singles	Nickolas N’Godrela (NCL)	Julien Delaplane (NCL)	Cyril Jacobe (VAN)	
Doubles	New Caledonia; Julien Delaplane; Nickolas N’Godrela	Vanuatu; Cyril Jacobe; Aymeric Mara	Fiji; Daneric Hazelman; William O'Connell	
Team	New Caledonia; Julien Delaplane; Guillaume Monot; Nickolas N’Godrela; Joannick Pattoua	Vanuatu; Cyril Jacobe; Aymeric Mara; Leniker Thomas	Tahiti; Patrice Cotti; Heve Kelley; Reynald Taaroa; Angelo Yersin	

=== Women's ===
Event	Gold	Silver	Bronze	Refs
Singles	Abigail Tere-Apisah (PNG)	Yaëlle Honakoko (NCL)	Anaève Pain (NCL)	
Doubles	Papua New Guinea; Abigail Tere-Apisah; Marcia Tere-Apisah	Papua New Guinea; Patricia Apisah; Violet Apisah	Tahiti; Estelle Tehau; Mayka Tehani Zima	
Team	Papua New Guinea; Patricia Apisah; Violet Apisah; Abigail Tere-Apisah; Marcia Tere-Apisah	New Caledonia; Yaëlle Honakoko; Lysiane Moto; Lindsey Nekiriai; Anaève Pain	Tahiti; Naia Guitton; Ravahere Marie-Emil Rauzy; Estelle Tehau; Mayka Tehani Zima	

=== Mixed ===
Event	Gold	Silver	Bronze	Refs
Doubles	Papua New Guinea; Mark Gibbons; Abigail Tere-Apisah	Papua New Guinea; Matthew Stubbings; Violet Apisah	New Caledonia; Guillaume Monot; Yaëlle Honakoko	

== See also ==
- Tennis at the Pacific Games
