= Tennis at the 2022 Pacific Mini Games – Men's singles =

Men's singles at the 2022 Pacific Mini Games
- Venue: American Memorial Park and Pacific Islands Club
- Dates: 19–24 June
- Competitors: 44 from 14 nations

Medalists
gold medal	Colin Sinclair	Northern Mariana Islands
silver medal	Matthew Stubbings	Papua New Guinea
bronze medal	William O'Connell	Fiji

The men's singles tennis event at the 2022 Pacific Mini Games took place at the American Memorial Park and Pacific Islands Club in Saipan, Northern Mariana Islands from 19 to 24 June 2022.

Northern Mariana's Colin Sinclair defeated Papua New Guinea's Matthew Stubbings, 6–0, 6–1, to win the gold medal in Men's Singles tennis at the 2022 Pacific Mini Games. In the bronze medal match, Fiji's William O'Connell beat Tahiti's Gillian Osmont, 6–2, 7^{7}–6^{3}.

== Schedule ==
Date	19 June	20 June	21 June	22 June	23 June	24 June
Men's singles	Round of 64	Round of 32	Round of 16	Quarterfinals	Semifinals	Finals

== Seeds ==
All seeds per ATP rankings.

1. (Northern Mariana Islands) Colin Sinclair (champion, gold medalist)
2. (Papua New Guinea) Matthew Stubbings (final, silver medalist)
3. (Vanuatu) Clement Mainguy (quarterfinals)
4. (French Polynesia) Gillian Osmont (semifinals, fourth place)
5. (Fiji) William O'Connell (semifinals, bronze medalist)
6. (Tonga) Matavao Fanguana (second round)
7. (New Caledonia) Victor Lopes (quarterfinals)
8. (French Polynesia) Reynald Taaroa (third round)
9. (Fiji) Sebastian Tikaram (quarterfinals)
10. (Northern Mariana Islands) Robert Schorr (quarterfinals)
11. (Guam) Camden Camacho (third round)
12. (New Caledonia) Icham Tidjine (third round, retired)
13. (Vanuatu) Aymeric Mara (third round)
14. (Tuvalu) Maka Ofati (second round, retired)
15. (Tonga) Semisi Fanguna (third round, retired)
16. (French Polynesia) Heimanarii Lai San (third round)

Click on the seed number of a player to go to their draw section.

== Results ==
=== Finals ===
Quarterfinals
1	(Northern Mariana Islands) Colin Sinclair	6	6
9	(Fiji) Sebastian Tikaram	1	1
4	(French Polynesia) Gillian Osmont	6	7
7	(New Caledonia) Victor Lopes	3	5
5	(Fiji) William O'Connell	6	6
3	(Vanuatu) Clement Mainguy	2	2
10	(Northern Mariana Islands) Robert Schorr	5	2
2	(Papua New Guinea) Matthew Stubbings	7	6

Semifinals
1	(Northern Mariana Islands) Colin Sinclair	6	6
4	(French Polynesia) Gillian Osmont	1	2
5	(Fiji) William O'Connell	4	6^{2}
2	(Papua New Guinea) Matthew Stubbings	6	7^{7}

Final
1	(Northern Mariana Islands) Colin Sinclair	6	6
2	(Papua New Guinea) Matthew Stubbings	0	1
Bronze medal
4	(French Polynesia) Gillian Osmont	2	6^{3}
5	(Fiji) William O'Connell	6	7^{7}

=== Top-half ===
==== Section 1 ====
First Round			Second Round				Third Round
			1	(Northern Mariana Islands) C Sinclair	6	6
(New Caledonia) L Boivin	6	6		(New Caledonia) L Boivin	0	2
(Guam) A Schembari	0	2					1	(Northern Mariana Islands) C Sinclair	6	6
							16	(French Polynesia) H Lai San	2	2
				(Kiribati) AB Torua	2	2
			16	(French Polynesia) H Lai San	6	6

==== Section 2 ====
First Round			Second Round					Third Round
			9	(Fiji) S Tikaram	6	2	6
(Samoa) K Pavitt	6	6		(Samoa) K Pavitt	4	6	0
(Papua New Guinea) E Mera	0	0						9	(Fiji) S Tikaram	4	6	6
(Vanuatu) Z Sands	6	6							(Vanuatu) Z Sands	6	3	3
(Solomon Islands) P Leong	1	1		(Vanuatu) Z Sands	w
			6	(Tonga) M Fanguana	o

==== Section 3 ====
First Round			Second Round				Third Round
			4	(French Polynesia) G Osmont	6	6
(Federated States of Micronesia) D Jr. Neth	1	1		(Solomon Islands) J Benjamin	2	3
(Solomon Islands) J Benjamin	6	6					4	(French Polynesia) G Osmont	6	6
							13	(Vanuatu) A Mara	1	4
				(Tuvalu) F T Haieti	2	0
			13	(Vanuatu) A Mara	6	6

==== Section 4 ====
First Round				Second Round				Third Round
				11	(Guam) C Camacho	W
					(Cook Islands) J Pierre	O
								11	(Guam) C Camacho	7^{(7)}	6	6^{(2)}
(Northern Mariana Islands) B J A Cruz	3	6	3					7	(New Caledonia) V Lopes	6^{(2)}	3	7^{(7)}
(Tonga) O Noa	6	3	6		(Tonga) O Noa	1	0
				7	(New Caledonia) V Lopes	6	6

=== Bottom half ===
==== Section 5 ====
First Round			Second Round				Third Round
			5	(Fiji) W O'Connell	6	6
(Solomon Islands) C Vakola	7^{(7)}	6		(Solomon Islands) C Vakola	0	0
(Federated States of Micronesia) A Panuelo	6^{(4)}	3					5	(Fiji) W O'Connell	6	6
(French Polynesia) R Chonvant	6	6					12	(New Caledonia) I Tidjine	2	2
(Guam) A Sachdev	4	4		(French Polynesia) R Chonvant	0	0^{r}
			12	(New Caledonia) I Tidjine	6	3

==== Section 6 ====
First Round				Second Round				Third Round
				15	(Tonga) S Fanguna	7	6
					(Federated States of Micronesia) T Apis	5	1
								15	(Tonga) S Fanguna	2	1^{r}
(Northern Mariana Islands) C N Ramsey	7	6^{(6)}	2					3	(Vanuatu) C Mainguy	6	2
(Tuvalu) M Pese	5	7^{(8)}	6		(Tuvalu) M Pese	0	1
				3	(Vanuatu) C Mainguy	6	6

==== Section 7 ====
First Round			Second Round				Third Round
			8	(French Polynesia) R Taaroa	6	6
(Kiribati) B Kourabi	4	4		(Samoa) L So'Onalole	2	1
(Samoa) L So'Onalole	6	6					8	(French Polynesia) R Taaroa	5	2
(Guam) D Gibson	6	6					10	(Northern Mariana Islands) R H Schorr	7	6
(Solomon Islands) J M Miki	2	3		(Guam) D Gibson	0	1
			10	(Northern Mariana Islands) R H Schorr	6	6

==== Section 8 ====
First Round			Second Round				Third Round
			14	(Tuvalu) M Ofati	2	0^{r}
				(New Caledonia) R Bonnet De Larbogne	6	2
								(New Caledonia) R Bonnet De Larbogne	1	4
(Cook Islands) B Baudinet	6	6					2	(Papua New Guinea) M Stubbings	6	6
(Vanuatu) N Molbaleh	2	4		(Cook Islands) B Baudinet	2	0
			2	(Papua New Guinea) M Stubbings	6	6
