= Tennis at the 2011 Pacific Games =

- Date: 29 August-8 September

Tennis at the 2011 Pacific Games in Nouméa, New Caledonia was held on August 29–September 8, 2011.

== Medal summary ==
=== Medal table ===
Rank	Nation	Gold	Silver	Bronze	Total
1	New Caledonia	5	2	1	8
2	Samoa	1	1	4	6
3	Papua New Guinea	1	1	1	3
4	Vanuatu	0	3	0	3
5	Solomon Islands	0	0	1	1
Totals (5 entries)		7	7	7	21

=== Medals events ===
Event	Gold	Silver	Bronze
Men's Singles	Nickolas N’Godrela; New Caledonia	Cyril Jacobe; Vanuatu	Michael Leong; Solomon Islands
Women's Singles	Élodie Rogge; New Caledonia	Anaève Pain; New Caledonia	Abigail Tere-Apisah; Papua New Guinea
Men's Doubles	Samoa; Juan Langton; Leon So'onalole	Vanuatu; Cyril Jacobe; Jerome Rovo	New Caledonia; Maxime Chazal; Nickolas N’Godrela
Women's Doubles	Papua New Guinea; Abigail Tere-Apisah; Marcia Tere-Apisah	New Caledonia; Anaève Pain; Élodie Rogge	Samoa; Kim Carruthers; Steffi Carruthers
Mixed Doubles	New Caledonia; Anaève Pain; Maxime Chazal	Samoa; Steffi Carruthers; Juan Langton	Samoa; Leon So'onalole; Maylani Ah Hoy
Men's Team	New Caledonia; Maxime Chazal; Pierre-Henri Guillaume; Nickolas N’Godrela; Loïc Perret	Vanuatu; Cyril Jacobe; Gregory Jacobe; Aymeric Mara; Lorenzo Pineda	Samoa; Juan Langton; Leon So'onalole; Marvin So'onalole
Women's Team	New Caledonia; Anaève Pain; Élodie Rogge; Meryl Pydo; Stéphanie Di Luccio	Papua New Guinea; Abigail Tere-Apisah; Marcia Tere-Apisah	Samoa; Kim Carruthers; Steffi Carruthers; Maylani Ah Hoy; Tagifano So'Onalole

== See also ==
- Tennis at the Pacific Games
- 2011 Pacific Games
- 2011 in tennis
