= 2019 Fed Cup Asia/Oceania Zone Group I – Pool B =

Subsection of tennis competition

Pool B of the 2019 Fed Cup Asia/Oceania Zone Group I was one of two pools in the Asia/Oceania zone of the 2019 Fed Cup. Four teams competed in a round robin competition, with the top team and the bottom team proceeding to their respective sections of the play-offs: the top team played for advancement to the World Group II Play-offs, while the bottom team faced potential relegation to Group II.

== Standings ==
		CHN	KOR	INA	POC	RR; W–L	Set; W–L	Game; W–L	Standings
2	China		3–0	3–0	3–0	3–0	18–3 (86%)	119–69 (63%)	1
3	South Korea	0–3		3–0	3–0	2–1	13–7 (65%)	103–80 (56%)	2
6	Indonesia	0–3	0–3		3–0	1–2	7–13 (35%)	80–106 (43%)	3
7	Pacific Oceania	0–3	0–3	0–3		0–3	3–18 (14%)	71–118 (38%)	4

Standings are determined by: 1. number of wins; 2. number of matches; 3. in two-team ties, head-to-head records; 4. in three-team ties, (a) percentage of sets won (head-to-head records if two teams remain tied), then (b) percentage of games won (head-to-head records if two teams remain tied), then (c) Fed Cup rankings.

== Round-robin ==
=== China vs. Pacific Oceania ===
China
3
Daulet National Tennis Centre, Astana, Kazakhstan
6 February
Hard (indoor)

Pacific Oceania
0

			1	2	3
1	(China) (Pacific Oceania)	Yang Zhaoxuan; Violet Apisah	6; 4	6; 4
2	(China) (Pacific Oceania)	Zhang Shuai; Abigail Tere-Apisah	6; 1	6; 2
3	(China) (Pacific Oceania)	Xu Yifan / Zheng Saisai; Steffi Carruthers / Abigail Tere-Apisah	3; 6	6; 3	6; 4

=== South Korea vs. Indonesia ===
South Korea
3
Daulet National Tennis Centre, Astana, Kazakhstan
6 February
Hard (indoor)

Indonesia
0

			1	2	3
1	(South Korea) (Indonesia)	Jang Su-jeong; Aldila Sutjiadi	6; 3	6; 2
2	(South Korea) (Indonesia)	Han Na-lae; Beatrice Gumulya	7^{7} 6^{4}	6; 4
3	(South Korea) (Indonesia)	Jeong Su-nam / Kim Na-ri; Deria Nur Haliza / Jessy Rompies	7; 5	6; 2

=== China vs. South Korea ===
China
3
Daulet National Tennis Centre, Astana, Kazakhstan
7 February
Hard (indoor)

South Korea
0

			1	2	3
1	(China) (South Korea)	Zheng Saisai; Jang Su-jeong	3; 6	6; 3	6; 3
2	(China) (South Korea)	Zhang Shuai; Han Na-lae	6; 0	6; 4
3	(China) (South Korea)	Yang Zhaoxuan / Zhang Shuai; Han Na-lae / Kim Na-ri	6; 3	7; 5

=== Indonesia vs. Pacific Oceania ===
Indonesia
3
Daulet National Tennis Centre, Astana, Kazakhstan
7 February
Hard (indoor)

Pacific Oceania
0

			1	2	3
1	(Indonesia) (Pacific Oceania)	Aldila Sutjiadi; Violet Apisah	6; 4	6; 2
2	(Indonesia) (Pacific Oceania)	Beatrice Gumulya; Abigail Tere-Apisah	6; 4	2; 6	6; 4
3	(Indonesia) (Pacific Oceania)	Deria Nur Haliza / Jessy Rompies; Steffi Carruthers / Abigail Tere-Apisah	6; 4	6; 4

=== China vs. Indonesia ===
China
3
Daulet National Tennis Centre, Astana, Kazakhstan
8 February
Hard (indoor)

Indonesia
0

			1	2	3
1	(China) (Indonesia)	Yang Zhaoxuan; Aldila Sutjiadi	6; 1	6; 4
2	(China) (Indonesia)	Zheng Saisai; Beatrice Gumulya	3; 6	6; 3	6; 1
3	(China) (Indonesia)	Wang Yafan / Xu Yifan; Deria Nur Haliza / Jessy Rompies	7; 5	6; 1

=== South Korea vs. Pacific Oceania ===
South Korea
3
Daulet National Tennis Centre, Astana, Kazakhstan
8 February
Hard (indoor)

Pacific Oceania
0

			1	2	3
1	(South Korea) (Pacific Oceania)	Jang Su-jeong; Carol Young Suh Lee	6; 2	6; 1
2	(South Korea) (Pacific Oceania)	Han Na-lae; Abigail Tere-Apisah	6; 1	5; 7	6; 3
3	(South Korea) (Pacific Oceania)	Jang Su-jeong / Kim Na-ri; Steffi Carruthers / Carol Young Suh Lee	6; 2	6; 3
