= 2018 Australian Open – Girls' doubles =

Girls' doubles
- 2018 Australian Open

Final
- Champions: (Chinese Taipei) Liang En-shuo (China) Wang Xinyu
- Runners-up: (Papua New Guinea) Violet Apisah (Switzerland) Lulu Sun
- Score: 7–6^{(7–4)}, 4–6, [10–5]

Events
Singles	men	women		boys	girls
Doubles	men	women	mixed	boys	girls
WC Singles	men	women	quad
WC Doubles	men	women	quad
Legends	men	women	mixed
- Australian Open

Liang En-shuo and Wang Xinyu won the girls' doubles tennis title at the 2018 Australian Open, defeating Violet Apisah and Lulu Sun in the final, 7–6^{(7–4)}, 4–6, [10–5].

Bianca Andreescu and Carson Branstine were the defending champions, but both players chose not to participate.

== Seeds ==
1. (Chinese Taipei) Liang En-shuo / (China) Wang Xinyu (champions)
2. (Switzerland) Simona Waltert / (China) Wang Xiyu (semifinals)
3. (Japan) Yuki Naito / (Japan) Naho Sato (semifinals)
4. (Ukraine) Viktoriia Dema / (Ukraine) Marta Kostyuk (first round)

5. (Argentina) María Lourdes Carlé / (Canada) Layne Sleeth (first round)
6. (Bulgaria) Gergana Topalova / (Latvia) Daniela Vismane (second round)
7. (Papua New Guinea) Violet Apisah / (Switzerland) Lulu Sun (final)
8. (France) Clara Burel / (China) Zheng Qinwen (second round)

== Draw ==
Key

- Q = Qualifier
- WC = Wild card
- LL = Lucky loser
- Alt = Alternate
- ITF = ITF entry
- PR = Protected ranking
- SR = Special ranking
- SE = Special exempt
- JE = Junior exempt
- JR = Junior Accelerator Programme entrant
- CO = College Accelerator Programme entrant
- NG = Next Gen Accelerator Program entrant
- w/o = Walkover
- r = Retired
- d = Defaulted

=== Finals ===
Semifinals
1	(Chinese Taipei) Liang En-shuo (China) Wang Xinyu	4	6	[10]
3	(Japan) Yuki Naito (Japan) Naho Sato	6	3	[7]
7	(Papua New Guinea) Violet Apisah (Switzerland) Lulu Sun	0	6	[10]
2	(Switzerland) Simona Waltert (China) Wang Xiyu	6	3	[7]

Final
1	(Chinese Taipei) Liang En-shuo (China) Wang Xinyu	7^{7}	4	[10]
7	(Papua New Guinea) Violet Apisah (Switzerland) Lulu Sun	6^{4}	6	[5]

=== Top half ===
First round
1	(Chinese Taipei) Liang En-shuo (China) Wang Xinyu	7	6
WC	(Australia) Zara Brankovic (Australia) Annerly Poulos	5	3
(Russia) Alina Charaeva (Russia) Kamilla Rakhimova	6	6
(Russia) Daria Frayman (Georgia (country)) Ana Makatsaria	2	3
(Georgia (country)) Mariam Dalakishvili (Georgia (country)) Zoziya Kardava	6	2	[3]
(United States) Dalayna Hewitt (United States) Peyton Stearns	2	6	[10]
(Morocco) Diae El Jardi (United Kingdom) Gemma Heath	2	1
6	(Bulgaria) Gergana Topalova (Latvia) Daniela Vismane	6	6
3	(Japan) Yuki Naito (Japan) Naho Sato	6	6
(France) Yasmine Mansouri (France) Diane Parry	1	4
(Czech Republic) Karolína Beránková (Poland) Ania Hertel	6	2	[3]
(Slovakia) Viktória Morvayová (Slovenia) Nika Radišić	1	6	[10]
(United Kingdom) Ali Collins (Poland) Stefania Rogozińska Dzik	3	6	[8]
WC	(Australia) Gabriella Da Silva-Fick (Australia) Ivana Popovic	6	4	[10]
(New Zealand) Valentina Ivanov (Hong Kong) Cody Wong Hong-yi	6	6
5	(Argentina) María Lourdes Carlé (Canada) Layne Sleeth	4	1

Second round
1	(Chinese Taipei) E-s Liang (China) Xin Wang	6	6
(Russia) A Charaeva (Russia) K Rakhimova	2	3
(United States) D Hewitt (United States) P Stearns	6	6
6	(Bulgaria) G Topalova (Latvia) D Vismane	3	0
3	(Japan) Y Naito (Japan) N Sato	7^{7}	6
(Slovakia) V Morvayová (Slovenia) N Radišić	6^{2}	3
WC	(Australia) G Da Silva-Fick (Australia) I Popovic	7^{7}	6
(New Zealand) V Ivanov (Hong Kong) CH-y Wong	6^{5}	4

Quarterfinals
1	(Chinese Taipei) E-s Liang (China) Xin Wang	7^{7}	6
(United States) D Hewitt (United States) P Stearns	6^{5}	3
3	(Japan) Y Naito (Japan) N Sato	7	4	[11]
WC	(Australia) G Da Silva-Fick (Australia) I Popovic	5	6	[9]

Semifinals
1	(Chinese Taipei) E-s Liang (China) Xin Wang	4	6	[10]
3	(Japan) Y Naito (Japan) N Sato	6	3	[7]

=== Bottom half ===
First round
7	(Papua New Guinea) Violet Apisah (Switzerland) Lulu Sun	6	7
(United States) Hurricane Tyra Black (United States) Coco Gauff	4	5
(Japan) Anri Nagata (Japan) Moyuka Uchijima	5	6	[7]
(Italy) Elisabetta Cocciaretto (Burundi) Sada Nahimana	7	2	[10]
WC	(Australia) Amber Marshall (Australia) Lisa Mays	4	3
(South Korea) Park So-hyun (Thailand) Mananchaya Sawangkaew	6	6
(France) Loudmilla Bencheikh (Japan) Mana Kawamura	0	6	[10]
4	(Ukraine) Viktoriia Dema (Ukraine) Marta Kostyuk	6	4	[5]
8	(France) Clara Burel (China) Zheng Qinwen	4	7^{7}	[11]
(Finland) Oona Orpana (Serbia) Draginja Vuković	6	6^{2}	[9]
(Chinese Taipei) Joanna Garland (Japan) Himari Sato	4	4
WC	(Australia) Olivia Gadecki (Australia) Megan Smith	6	6
(United States) Elysia Bolton (United States) Nicole Mossmer	7	2	[3]
(United States) Alexa Noel (Japan) Rina Saigo	5	6	[10]
(India) Akanksha Bhan (Japan) Sakura Hosogi	1	6^{2}
2	(Switzerland) Simona Waltert (China) Wang Xiyu	6	7^{7}

Second round
7	(Papua New Guinea) V Apisah (Switzerland) L Sun	6	6
(Italy) E Cocciaretto (Burundi) S Nahimana	4	2
(South Korea) S-h Park (Thailand) M Sawangkaew	4	4
(France) L Bencheikh (Japan) M Kawamura	6	6
8	(France) C Burel (China) Q Zheng	3	0
WC	(Australia) O Gadecki (Australia) M Smith	6	6
(United States) A Noel (Japan) R Saigo	2	3
2	(Switzerland) S Waltert (China) Xiy Wang	6	6

Quarterfinals
7	(Papua New Guinea) V Apisah (Switzerland) L Sun	7^{7}	6
(France) L Bencheikh (Japan) M Kawamura	6^{0}	2
WC	(Australia) O Gadecki (Australia) M Smith	3	6^{0}
2	(Switzerland) S Waltert (China) Xiy Wang	6	7^{7}

Semifinals
7	(Papua New Guinea) V Apisah (Switzerland) L Sun	0	6	[10]
2	(Switzerland) S Waltert (China) Xiy Wang	6	3	[7]
