= 2018 Australian Open – Women's singles =

Women's singles
- 2018 Australian Open

Final
- Champion: (Denmark) Caroline Wozniacki
- Runner-up: (Romania) Simona Halep
- Score: 7–6^{(7–2)}, 3–6, 6–4

Details
- Draw: 128 (12Q / 8WC)
- Seeds: 32

Events
Singles	men	women		boys	girls
Doubles	men	women	mixed	boys	girls
WC Singles	men	women	quad
WC Doubles	men	women	quad
Legends	men	women	mixed
- Australian Open

Caroline Wozniacki defeated Simona Halep in the final, 7–6^{(7–2)}, 3–6, 6–4 to win the women's singles tennis title at the 2018 Australian Open. It was her first major title, becoming the first Dane to win a singles major. With the win, Wozniacki regained the world No. 1 singles ranking for the first time since 2012. She saved two match points en route to the title, in the second round against Jana Fett; Halep also saved match points to reach the final, saving three against Lauren Davis in the third round and two against Angelique Kerber in the semifinals. It was Halep's third runner-up finish in as many major finals, though she would win the French Open a few months later. In addition to Wozniacki and Halep, Garbiñe Muguruza, Elina Svitolina, Karolína Plíšková and Jeļena Ostapenko were in contention for the world No. 1 ranking. The final marked the first match between the top two players in the world since the 2015 Australian Open final.

Serena Williams was the reigning champion, but did not participate this year as she was not fully fit after giving birth in September 2017. As a result, she dropped out of the WTA rankings for the first time since 20 October 1997.

The third-round match between Halep and Davis lasted 28 games, tying Chanda Rubin and Arantxa Sánchez Vicario's 1996 quarterfinal match for the Australian Open's record for most games played in a women's match.

At 15 years and 6 months old, Marta Kostyuk became the youngest player to win a main draw match at the Australian Open since Martina Hingis in 1996 and the youngest to reach the third round at a major since Mirjana Lučić-Baroni at the 1997 US Open. Kostyuk was the youngest player to qualify for a major main draw since Sesil Karatantcheva at the 2005 Australian Open.

This tournament marked the first main-draw Australian Open appearance for future two-time champion and World No. 1 Aryna Sabalenka; she lost to Ashleigh Barty in the first round.

== Seeds ==
1. (Romania) Simona Halep (final)
2. (Denmark) Caroline Wozniacki (champion)
3. (Spain) Garbiñe Muguruza (second round)
4. (Ukraine) Elina Svitolina (quarterfinals)
5. (United States) Venus Williams (first round)
6. (Czech Republic) Karolína Plíšková (quarterfinals)
7. (Latvia) Jeļena Ostapenko (third round)
8. (France) Caroline Garcia (fourth round)
9. (United Kingdom) Johanna Konta (second round)
10. (United States) CoCo Vandeweghe (first round)
11. (France) Kristina Mladenovic (first round)
12. (Germany) Julia Görges (second round)
13. (United States) Sloane Stephens (first round)
14. (Latvia) Anastasija Sevastova (second round)
15. (Russia) Anastasia Pavlyuchenkova (second round)
16. (Russia) Elena Vesnina (second round)

17. (United States) Madison Keys (quarterfinals)
18. (Australia) Ashleigh Barty (third round)
19. (Slovakia) Magdaléna Rybáriková (fourth round)
20. (Czech Republic) Barbora Strýcová (fourth round)
21. (Germany) Angelique Kerber (semifinals)
22. (Russia) Daria Kasatkina (second round)
23. (Australia) Daria Gavrilova (second round)
24. (Slovakia) Dominika Cibulková (first round)
25. (China) Peng Shuai (first round)
26. (Poland) Agnieszka Radwańska (third round)
27. (Czech Republic) Petra Kvitová (first round)
28. (Croatia) Mirjana Lučić-Baroni (second round)
29. (Czech Republic) Lucie Šafářová (third round)
30. (Netherlands) Kiki Bertens (third round)
31. (Russia) Ekaterina Makarova (first round)
32. (Estonia) Anett Kontaveit (fourth round)

Click on the seed number of a player to go to their draw section.

== Draw ==
Key

- Q = Qualifier
- WC = Wild card
- LL = Lucky loser
- Alt = Alternate
- ITF = ITF entry
- PR = Protected ranking
- SR = Special ranking
- SE = Special exempt
- JE = Junior exempt
- JR = Junior Accelerator Programme entrant
- CO = College Accelerator Programme entrant
- NG = Next Gen Accelerator Program entrant
- w/o = Walkover
- r = Retired
- d = Defaulted

=== Finals ===
Quarterfinals
1	(Romania) Simona Halep	6	6
6	(Czech Republic) Karolína Plíšková	3	2
21	(Germany) Angelique Kerber	6	6
17	(United States) Madison Keys	1	2
(Belgium) Elise Mertens	6	6
4	(Ukraine) Elina Svitolina	4	0
(Spain) Carla Suárez Navarro	0	7^{7}	2
2	(Denmark) Caroline Wozniacki	6	6^{3}	6

Semifinals
1	(Romania) Simona Halep	6	4	9
21	(Germany) Angelique Kerber	3	6	7
(Belgium) Elise Mertens	3	6^{2}
2	(Denmark) Caroline Wozniacki	6	7^{7}

Final
1	(Romania) Simona Halep	6^{2}	6	4
2	(Denmark) Caroline Wozniacki	7^{7}	3	6

=== Top half ===
==== Section 1 ====
First round
1	(Romania) S Halep	7^{7}	6
WC	(Australia) D Aiava	6^{5}	1
(Canada) E Bouchard	6	7^{7}
(France) O Dodin	3	6^{5}
(United States) L Davis	6^{4}	6	6
(Slovakia) J Čepelová	7^{7}	3	1
(Germany) A Petkovic	6	4	10
27	(Czech Republic) P Kvitová	3	6	8
18	(Australia) A Barty	6^{2}	6	6
(Belarus) A Sabalenka	7^{7}	4	4
(Italy) C Giorgi	6	6
Q	(Russia) A Kalinskaya	4	3
(Japan) N Osaka	7	6
PR	(Slovakia) K Kučová	5	2
(Tunisia) O Jabeur	3	4
16	(Russia) E Vesnina	6	6

Second round
1	(Romania) S Halep	6	6
(Canada) E Bouchard	2	2
(United States) L Davis	4	6	6
(Germany) A Petkovic	6	0	0
18	(Australia) A Barty	5	6	6
(Italy) C Giorgi	7	4	1
(Japan) N Osaka	7^{7}	6
16	(Russia) E Vesnina	6^{4}	2

Third round
1	(Romania) S Halep	4	6	15
(United States) L Davis	6	4	13
18	(Australia) A Barty	4	2
(Japan) N Osaka	6	6

Fourth round
1	(Romania) S Halep	6	6
(Japan) N Osaka	3	2

==== Section 2 ====
First round
9	(United Kingdom) J Konta	6	6
(United States) M Brengle	3	1
Q	(Russia) A Blinkova	2	2
LL	(United States) B Pera	6	6
(Spain) L Arruabarrena	6	6
(Netherlands) R Hogenkamp	1	2
WC	(United States) K Ahn	1	5
20	(Czech Republic) B Strýcová	6	7
29	(Czech Republic) L Šafářová	7	6
WC	(Australia) A Tomljanović	5	3
(Romania) S Cîrstea	5	6	6
(Kazakhstan) Z Diyas	7	4	3
WC	(Australia) L Cabrera	6^{3}	4
(Brazil) B Haddad Maia	7^{7}	6
(Paraguay) V Cepede Royg	3	4
6	(Czech Republic) Ka Plíšková	6	6

Second round
9	(United Kingdom) J Konta	4	5
LL	(United States) B Pera	6	7
(Spain) L Arruabarrena	3	4
20	(Czech Republic) B Strýcová	6	6
29	(Czech Republic) L Šafářová	6	6
(Romania) S Cîrstea	2	4
(Brazil) B Haddad Maia	1	1
6	(Czech Republic) Ka Plíšková	6	6

Third round
LL	(United States) B Pera	2	2
20	(Czech Republic) B Strýcová	6	6
29	(Czech Republic) L Šafářová	6^{6}	5
6	(Czech Republic) Ka Plíšková	7^{8}	7

Fourth round
20	(Czech Republic) B Strýcová	7^{7}	3	2
6	(Czech Republic) Ka Plíšková	6^{5}	6	6

==== Section 3 ====
First round
3	(Spain) G Muguruza	6	6
WC	(France) J Ponchet	4	3
(Chinese Taipei) S-w Hsieh	0	6	8
Q	(China) L Zhu	6	0	6
(Russia) N Vikhlyantseva	6	3	4
(Ukraine) L Tsurenko	3	6	6
(Czech Republic) Kr Plíšková	6	3	2
26	(Poland) A Radwańska	2	6	6
21	(Germany) A Kerber	6	6
PR	(Germany) A-L Friedsam	0	4
(Japan) N Hibino	5	3
(Croatia) D Vekić	7	6
(Germany) T Maria	1	4
(Russia) M Sharapova	6	6
(United States) V Lepchenko	6	3	2
14	(Latvia) A Sevastova	3	6	6

Second round
3	(Spain) G Muguruza	6^{1}	4
(Chinese Taipei) S-w Hsieh	7^{7}	6
(Ukraine) L Tsurenko	6	5	3
26	(Poland) A Radwańska	2	7	6
21	(Germany) A Kerber	6	6
(Croatia) D Vekić	4	1
(Russia) M Sharapova	6	7^{7}
14	(Latvia) A Sevastova	1	6^{4}

Third round
(Chinese Taipei) S-w Hsieh	6	7
26	(Poland) A Radwańska	2	5
21	(Germany) A Kerber	6	6
(Russia) M Sharapova	1	3

Fourth round
(Chinese Taipei) S-w Hsieh	6	5	2
21	(Germany) A Kerber	4	7	6

==== Section 4 ====
First round
11	(France) K Mladenovic	3	2
(Romania) A Bogdan	6	6
(Kazakhstan) Y Putintseva	7	7^{8}
(United Kingdom) H Watson	5	6^{6}
(Slovenia) P Hercog	6^{2}	4
(Russia) E Alexandrova	7^{7}	6
(China) Q Wang	1	5
17	(United States) M Keys	6	7
28	(Croatia) M Lučić-Baroni	7^{8}	5	6
(United States) S Rogers	6^{6}	7	2
(United States) C McHale	3	2
(Belarus) A Sasnovich	6	6
(Japan) K Nara	5	4
(Czech Republic) M Vondroušová	7	6
(Germany) C Witthöft	5	3
8	(France) C Garcia	7	6

Second round
(Romania) A Bogdan	1	6	6
(Kazakhstan) Y Putintseva	6	2	3
(Russia) E Alexandrova	0	1
17	(United States) M Keys	6	6
28	(Croatia) M Lučić-Baroni	3	1
(Belarus) A Sasnovich	6	6
(Czech Republic) M Vondroušová	7^{7}	2	6
8	(France) C Garcia	6^{3}	6	8

Third round
(Romania) A Bogdan	3	4
17	(United States) M Keys	6	6
(Belarus) A Sasnovich	3	7	2
8	(France) C Garcia	6	5	6

Fourth round
17	(United States) M Keys	6	6
8	(France) C Garcia	3	2

=== Bottom half ===
==== Section 5 ====
First round
5	(United States) V Williams	3	5
(Switzerland) B Bencic	6	7
Q	(Thailand) L Kumkhum	6	7
(Sweden) J Larsson	3	5
(Belgium) A Van Uytvanck	6^{5}	3
(Croatia) P Martić	7^{7}	6
(Romania) I-C Begu	3	6	8
31	(Russia) E Makarova	6	4	6
23	(Australia) D Gavrilova	6	6
Q	(United States) I Falconi	1	1
Q	(Slovakia) V Kužmová	2	1
(Belgium) E Mertens	6	6
(France) A Cornet	6	6
WC	(China) X Wang	4	2
(United States) S Kenin	4	4
12	(Germany) J Görges	6	6

Second round
(Switzerland) B Bencic	1	3
Q	(Thailand) L Kumkhum	6	6
(Croatia) P Martić	6	7^{7}
(Romania) I-C Begu	4	6^{3}
23	(Australia) D Gavrilova	5	3
(Belgium) E Mertens	7	6
(France) A Cornet	6	6
12	(Germany) J Görges	4	3

Third round
Q	(Thailand) L Kumkhum	3	6	5
(Croatia) P Martić	6	3	7
(Belgium) E Mertens	7	6
(France) A Cornet	5	4

Fourth round
(Croatia) P Martić	6^{5}	5
(Belgium) E Mertens	7^{7}	7

==== Section 6 ====
First round
13	(United States) S Stephens	6	6^{2}	2
(China) S Zhang	2	7^{7}	6
Q	(Czech Republic) D Allertová	6	6
(France) P Parmentier	3	0
(United States) J Brady	6	4	3
(Poland) M Linette	2	6	6
Q	(Slovakia) AK Schmiedlová	0	3
22	(Russia) D Kasatkina	6	6
25	(China) S Peng	2	2
Q	(Ukraine) M Kostyuk	6	6
WC	(Australia) J Fourlis	3	7^{7}	2
WC	(Australia) O Rogowska	6	6^{3}	6
(Greece) M Sakkari	2	7^{7}	4
(Czech Republic) K Siniaková	6	6^{5}	6
Q	(Serbia) I Jorović	3	2
4	(Ukraine) E Svitolina	6	6

Second round
(China) S Zhang	4	6^{5}
Q	(Czech Republic) D Allertová	6	7^{7}
(Poland) M Linette	7^{7}	6
22	(Russia) D Kasatkina	6^{4}	2
Q	(Ukraine) M Kostyuk	6	7
WC	(Australia) O Rogowska	3	5
(Czech Republic) K Siniaková	6	2	1
4	(Ukraine) E Svitolina	4	6	6

Third round
Q	(Czech Republic) D Allertová	6	6
(Poland) M Linette	1	4
Q	(Ukraine) M Kostyuk	2	2
4	(Ukraine) E Svitolina	6	6

Fourth round
Q	(Czech Republic) D Allertová	3	0
4	(Ukraine) E Svitolina	6	6

==== Section 7 ====
First round
7	(Latvia) J Ostapenko	6	6
(Italy) F Schiavone	1	4
(China) Y Duan	6	6
(Colombia) M Duque Mariño	0	1
(Romania) M Niculescu	4	5
(Germany) M Barthel	6	7
(Serbia) A Krunić	4	5
32	(Estonia) A Kontaveit	6	7
24	(Slovakia) D Cibulková	2	2
(Estonia) K Kanepi	6	6
(Australia) S Stosur	6	6^{6}	4
(Puerto Rico) M Puig	4	7^{8}	6
(Spain) C Suárez Navarro	7	6
Q	(Poland) M Fręch	5	3
(Hungary) T Babos	7^{7}	6
10	(United States) C Vandeweghe	6^{4}	2

Second round
7	(Latvia) J Ostapenko	6	3	6
(China) Y Duan	3	6	4
(Germany) M Barthel	3	6	3
32	(Estonia) A Kontaveit	6	4	6
(Estonia) K Kanepi	6	6
(Puerto Rico) M Puig	4	3
(Spain) C Suárez Navarro	6	2	6
(Hungary) T Babos	4	6	2

Third round
7	(Latvia) J Ostapenko	3	6	3
32	(Estonia) A Kontaveit	6	1	6
(Estonia) K Kanepi	6	1	3
(Spain) C Suárez Navarro	3	6	6

Fourth round
32	(Estonia) A Kontaveit	6	4	6
(Spain) C Suárez Navarro	4	6	8

==== Section 8 ====
First round
15	(Russia) A Pavlyuchenkova	3	6	6
(Ukraine) K Kozlova	6	4	3
Q	(Switzerland) V Golubic	6^{3}	6	2
(Ukraine) K Bondarenko	7^{7}	4	6
(Belgium) K Flipkens	2	7^{8}	6
(United States) A Riske	6	6^{6}	3
(United States) T Townsend	0	5
19	(Slovakia) M Rybáriková	6	7
30	(Netherlands) K Bertens	6^{5}	6	6
(United States) C Bellis	7^{7}	4	2
(United States) N Gibbs	6	6
LL	(Bulgaria) V Tomova	1	1
(Croatia) J Fett	6	6
PR	(Japan) M Eguchi	3	2
(Romania) M Buzărnescu	2	3
2	(Denmark) C Wozniacki	6	6

Second round
15	(Russia) A Pavlyuchenkova	2	3
(Ukraine) K Bondarenko	6	6
(Belgium) K Flipkens	4	6	2
19	(Slovakia) M Rybáriková	6	0	6
30	(Netherlands) K Bertens	7^{7}	6
(United States) N Gibbs	6^{3}	0
(Croatia) J Fett	6	2	5
2	(Denmark) C Wozniacki	3	6	7

Third round
(Ukraine) K Bondarenko	5	6	1
19	(Slovakia) M Rybáriková	7	3	6
30	(Netherlands) K Bertens	4	3
2	(Denmark) C Wozniacki	6	6

Fourth round
19	(Slovakia) M Rybáriková	3	0
2	(Denmark) C Wozniacki	6	6

== Championship match statistics ==
Category	(Denmark) Wozniacki	(Romania) Halep
1st serve %	59/102 (58%)	71/116 (61%)
1st serve points won	39 of 59 = 66%	46 of 71 = 65%
2nd serve points won	22 of 43 = 51%	21 of 45 = 47%
Total service points won	61 of 102 = 59.80%	67 of 116 = 57.76%
Aces	2	6
Double faults	6	1
Winners	25	40
Unforced errors	28	47
Net points won	11 of 17 = 65%	11 of 12 = 92%
Break points converted	5 of 14 = 36%	5 of 12 = 42%
Return points won	49 of 116 = 42%	41 of 102 = 40%
Total points won	110	108

Preceded by 2017 US Open – Women's singles	Grand Slam women's singles	Succeeded by 2018 French Open – Women's singles
