= 2018 Australian Open – Men's singles =

Tennis tournament held in 2018

Men's singles
- 2018 Australian Open

Final
- Champion: (Switzerland) Roger Federer
- Runner-up: (Croatia) Marin Čilić
- Score: 6–2, 6–7^{(5–7)}, 6–3, 3–6, 6–1

Details
- Draw: 128 (16Q / 8WC)
- Seeds: 32

Events
Singles	men	women		boys	girls
Doubles	men	women	mixed	boys	girls
WC Singles	men	women	quad
WC Doubles	men	women	quad
Legends	men	women	mixed
- Australian Open

Defending champion Roger Federer defeated Marin Čilić in the final, 6–2, 6–7^{(5–7)}, 6–3, 3–6, 6–1 to win the men's singles tennis title at the 2018 Australian Open. It was his record-equalling sixth Australian Open title (tied with Roy Emerson and Novak Djokovic), and his record-extending 20th and last major title overall. At 36 years, 5 months and 20 days old, Federer was the oldest man to win a major singles title since Ken Rosewall in 1972. Čilić became the first Croatian to reach an Australian Open singles final.

This was the first time since the 2008 Wimbledon Championships that two unseeded players (Chung Hyeon and Kyle Edmund) reached the semifinals of a men's singles major, and the first time at the Australian Open since 1999. Chung became the first South Korean to reach a major quarterfinal and semifinal.

This was the last Australian Open appearance for former world No. 3 and US Open champion Juan Martin del Potro; he lost to Tomáš Berdych in the third round.

== Seeds ==
All seedings per ATP rankings.

1. (Spain) Rafael Nadal (quarterfinals, retired)
2. (Switzerland) Roger Federer (champion)
3. (Bulgaria) Grigor Dimitrov (quarterfinals)
4. (Germany) Alexander Zverev (third round)
5. (Austria) Dominic Thiem (fourth round)
6. (Croatia) Marin Čilić (final)
7. (Belgium) David Goffin (second round)
8. (United States) Jack Sock (first round)
9. (Switzerland) Stan Wawrinka (second round)
10. (Spain) Pablo Carreño Busta (fourth round)
11. (South Africa) Kevin Anderson (first round)
12. (Argentina) Juan Martín del Potro (third round)
13. (United States) Sam Querrey (second round)
14. (Serbia) Novak Djokovic (fourth round)
15. (France) Jo-Wilfried Tsonga (third round)
16. (United States) John Isner (first round)

17. (Australia) Nick Kyrgios (fourth round)
18. (France) Lucas Pouille (first round)
19. (Czech Republic) Tomáš Berdych (quarterfinals)
20. (Spain) Roberto Bautista Agut (first round)
21. (Spain) Albert Ramos-Viñolas (third round)
22. (Canada) Milos Raonic (first round)
23. (Luxembourg) Gilles Müller (third round)
24. (Argentina) Diego Schwartzman (fourth round)
25. (Italy) Fabio Fognini (fourth round)
26. (France) Adrian Mannarino (third round)
27. (Germany) Philipp Kohlschreiber (first round)
28. (Bosnia and Herzegovina) Damir Džumhur (third round)
29. (France) Richard Gasquet (third round)
30. (Russia) Andrey Rublev (third round)
31. (Uruguay) Pablo Cuevas (second round)
32. (Germany) Mischa Zverev (first round, retired)

Click on the seed number of a player to go to their draw section.

== Draw ==
Key

- Q = Qualifier
- WC = Wild card
- LL = Lucky loser
- Alt = Alternate
- ITF = ITF entry
- PR = Protected ranking
- SR = Special ranking
- SE = Special exempt
- JE = Junior exempt
- JR = Junior Accelerator Programme entrant
- CO = College Accelerator Programme entrant
- NG = Next Gen Accelerator Program entrant
- w/o = Walkover
- r = Retired
- d = Defaulted

=== Finals ===
Quarterfinals
1	(Spain) Rafael Nadal	6	3	7^{7}	2	0^{r}
6	(Croatia) Marin Čilić	3	6	6^{5}	6	2
3	(Bulgaria) Grigor Dimitrov	4	6	3	4
(United Kingdom) Kyle Edmund	6	3	6	6
(United States) Tennys Sandgren	4	6^{5}	3
(South Korea) Chung Hyeon	6	7^{7}	6
19	(Czech Republic) Tomáš Berdych	6^{1}	3	4
2	(Switzerland) Roger Federer	7^{7}	6	6

Semifinals
6	(Croatia) Marin Čilić	6	7^{7}	6
(United Kingdom) Kyle Edmund	2	6^{4}	2
(South Korea) Chung Hyeon	1	2^{r}
2	(Switzerland) Roger Federer	6	5

Final
6	(Croatia) Marin Čilić	2	7^{7}	3	6	1
2	(Switzerland) Roger Federer	6	6^{5}	6	3	6

=== Top half ===
==== Section 1 ====
First round
1	(Spain) R Nadal	6	6	6
(Dominican Republic) V Estrella Burgos	1	1	1
(Chile) N Jarry	2	6^{1}	3
(Argentina) L Mayer	6	7^{7}	6
PR	(Australia) J Millman	7	6	6
(Croatia) B Ćorić	5	4	1
(Italy) P Lorenzi	6	6	6^{5}	2	4
28	(Bosnia and Herzegovina) D Džumhur	3	2	7^{7}	6	6
24	(Argentina) D Schwartzman	2	6	5	6	11
(Serbia) D Lajović	6	3	7	4	9
Q	(Norway) C Ruud	6	3	6^{5}	7	11
Q	(France) Q Halys	3	6	7^{7}	5	9
(Ukraine) A Dolgopolov	7^{7}	6	6
PR	(Austria) A Haider-Maurer	6^{3}	3	4
(Australia) M Ebden	6	3	6	6
16	(United States) J Isner	4	6	3	3

Second round
1	(Spain) R Nadal	6	6	7^{7}
(Argentina) L Mayer	3	4	6^{4}
PR	(Australia) J Millman	5	6	4	1
28	(Bosnia and Herzegovina) D Džumhur	7	3	6	6
24	(Argentina) D Schwartzman	6	6	6
Q	(Norway) C Ruud	4	2	3
(Ukraine) A Dolgopolov	7^{7}	6	6
(Australia) M Ebden	6^{0}	3	4

Third round
1	(Spain) R Nadal	6	6	6
28	(Bosnia and Herzegovina) D Džumhur	1	3	1
24	(Argentina) D Schwartzman	6^{1}	6	6	6
(Ukraine) A Dolgopolov	7^{7}	2	3	3

Fourth round
1	(Spain) R Nadal	6	6^{4}	6	6
24	(Argentina) D Schwartzman	3	7^{7}	3	3

==== Section 2 ====
First round
10	(Spain) P Carreño Busta	7	4	7	6
WC	(Australia) J Kubler	5	6	5	1
(France) G Simon	7	6	6
(Romania) M Copil	5	4	3
Q	(Italy) S Caruso	7^{7}	6	3	5	3
(Tunisia) M Jaziri	6^{2}	3	6	7	6
(Argentina) F Delbonis	5	4	3
23	(Luxembourg) G Müller	7	6	6
31	(Uruguay) P Cuevas	7^{9}	6	7
(Russia) M Youzhny	6^{7}	3	5
(Israel) D Sela	3	7	6	5	2
(United States) R Harrison	6	5	3	7	6
Q	(Germany) D Brown	4	3	6	7^{7}	1
(Portugal) J Sousa	6	6	4	6^{4}	6
Q	(Canada) V Pospisil	2	2	6	6^{5}
6	(Croatia) M Čilić	6	6	4	7^{7}

Second round
10	(Spain) P Carreño Busta	6	3
(France) G Simon	2	0^{r}
(Tunisia) M Jaziri	5	4	7^{7}	6	2
23	(Luxembourg) G Müller	7	6	6^{5}	3	6
31	(Uruguay) P Cuevas	4	6^{5}	4
(United States) R Harrison	6	7^{7}	6
(Portugal) J Sousa	1	5	2
6	(Croatia) M Čilić	6	7	6

Third round
10	(Spain) P Carreño Busta	7^{7}	4	7	7
23	(Luxembourg) G Müller	6^{4}	6	5	5
(United States) R Harrison	6^{4}	3	6^{4}
6	(Croatia) M Čilić	7^{7}	6	7^{7}

Fourth round
10	(Spain) P Carreño Busta	7^{7}	3	6^{0}	6^{3}
6	(Croatia) M Čilić	6^{2}	6	7^{7}	7^{7}

==== Section 3 ====
First round
3	(Bulgaria) G Dimitrov	6	6	6
Q	(Austria) D Novak	3	2	1
Q	(United States) M McDonald	6	6	4	6
Q	(Sweden) E Ymer	4	3	6	1
(Cyprus) M Baghdatis	7^{7}	6	6
Q	(India) Y Bhambri	6^{4}	4	3
(Spain) D Ferrer	5	7^{8}	2	7^{8}	2
30	(Russia) A Rublev	7	6^{6}	6	6^{6}	6
17	(Australia) N Kyrgios	6	6	6
(Brazil) R Dutra Silva	1	2	4
(Serbia) V Troicki	6^{2}	4	6	6	6
WC	(Australia) A Bolt	7^{7}	6	2	3	4
(Greece) S Tsitsipas	1	3	6^{5}
(Canada) D Shapovalov	6	6	7^{7}
Q	(United States) K King	4	4	1
15	(France) J-W Tsonga	6	6	6

Second round
3	(Bulgaria) G Dimitrov	4	6	6	0	8
Q	(United States) M McDonald	6	2	4	6	6
(Cyprus) M Baghdatis	4	7^{7}	4	2
30	(Russia) A Rublev	6	6^{5}	6	6
17	(Australia) N Kyrgios	7	6	7^{7}
(Serbia) V Troicki	5	4	6^{2}
(Canada) D Shapovalov	6	3	6	6^{4}	5
15	(France) J-W Tsonga	3	6	1	7^{7}	7

Third round
3	(Bulgaria) G Dimitrov	6	4	6	6
30	(Russia) A Rublev	3	6	4	4
17	(Australia) N Kyrgios	7^{7}	4	7^{8}	7^{7}
15	(France) J-W Tsonga	6^{5}	6	6^{6}	6^{5}

Fourth round
3	(Bulgaria) G Dimitrov	7^{7}	7^{7}	4	7^{7}
17	(Australia) N Kyrgios	6^{3}	6^{4}	6	6^{4}

==== Section 4 ====
First round
11	(South Africa) K Anderson	7^{7}	3	6	3	4
(United Kingdom) K Edmund	6^{4}	6	3	6	6
(France) P-H Herbert	2	1	7	6^{3}
(Uzbekistan) D Istomin	6	6	5	7^{7}
(Austria) G Melzer	3	4	6	3
(Georgia (country)) N Basilashvili	6	6	2	6
Q	(Belgium) R Bemelmans	6	6	6^{4}	7^{8}
18	(France) L Pouille	4	4	7^{7}	6^{6}
27	(Germany) P Kohlschreiber	3	6	0	6	2
PR	(Japan) Y Nishioka	6	2	6	1	6
(Italy) A Seppi	3	6	6	6
WC	(France) C Moutet	6	4	2	2
(Croatia) I Karlović	7^{7}	6	7^{7}
(Serbia) L Đere	6^{3}	3	6^{2}
(Japan) Y Sugita	6	7^{7}	5	6
8	(United States) J Sock	1	6^{4}	7	3

Second round
(United Kingdom) K Edmund	6	6	6
(Uzbekistan) D Istomin	2	2	4
(Georgia (country)) N Basilashvili	7	6	6
Q	(Belgium) R Bemelmans	5	1	3
PR	(Japan) Y Nishioka	1	3	4
(Italy) A Seppi	6	6	6
(Croatia) I Karlović	7^{7}	6^{3}	7	4	12
(Japan) Y Sugita	6^{3}	7^{7}	5	6	10

Third round
(United Kingdom) K Edmund	7^{7}	3	4	6	7
(Georgia (country)) N Basilashvili	6^{0}	6	6	0	5
(Italy) A Seppi	6	7^{7}	6^{3}	6^{5}	9
(Croatia) I Karlović	3	6^{4}	7^{7}	7^{7}	7

Fourth round
(United Kingdom) K Edmund	6^{4}	7	6	6
(Italy) A Seppi	7^{7}	5	2	3

=== Bottom half ===
==== Section 5 ====
First round
5	(Austria) D Thiem	6	6	6
(Argentina) G Pella	4	4	4
(United States) S Johnson	7^{7}	3	6^{3}	2
Q	(United States) D Kudla	6^{5}	6	7^{7}	6
Q	(Czech Republic) V Šafránek	4	3	3
(Czech Republic) J Veselý	6	6	6
LL	(Italy) M Berrettini	4	4	4
26	(France) A Mannarino	6	6	6
20	(Spain) R Bautista Agut	1	5	5
(Spain) F Verdasco	6	7	7
(Germany) C-M Stebe	0	3	4
(Germany) M Marterer	6	6	6
(France) J Chardy	4	6^{2}	2
(United States) T Sandgren	6	7^{7}	6
PR	(Lithuania) R Berankis	3	4	6	6^{2}
9	(Switzerland) S Wawrinka	6	6	2	7^{7}

Second round
5	(Austria) D Thiem	6^{6}	3	6	6	6
Q	(United States) D Kudla	7^{8}	6	3	2	3
(Czech Republic) J Veselý	3	6^{4}	7	3
26	(France) A Mannarino	6	7^{7}	5	6
(Spain) F Verdasco	4	6	6^{5}	6	3
(Germany) M Marterer	6	4	7^{7}	3	6
(United States) T Sandgren	6	6	6
9	(Switzerland) S Wawrinka	2	1	4

Third round
5	(Austria) D Thiem	6	6	7
26	(France) A Mannarino	4	2	5
(Germany) M Marterer	7	3	5	6^{5}
(United States) T Sandgren	5	6	7	7^{7}

Fourth round
5	(Austria) D Thiem	2	6	6^{4}	7^{9}	3
(United States) T Sandgren	6	4	7^{7}	6^{7}	6

==== Section 6 ====
First round
14	(Serbia) N Djokovic	6	6	6
(United States) D Young	1	2	4
(France) G Monfils	6	7^{7}	6
Q	(Spain) J Munar	3	6^{5}	4
WC	(United States) T Smyczek	6	6^{14}	6	6
WC	(Australia) A Popyrin	3	7^{16}	3	3
(United States) J Donaldson	2	3	4
21	(Spain) A Ramos Viñolas	6	6	6
32	(Germany) M Zverev	2	1^{r}
(South Korea) H Chung	6	4
WC	(Australia) T Kokkinakis	2	7^{8}	6^{8}	4
(Russia) D Medvedev	6	6^{6}	7^{10}	6
(Kazakhstan) M Kukushkin	3	3	1
(Germany) P Gojowczyk	6	6	6
(Italy) T Fabbiano	1	6^{5}	5
4	(Germany) A Zverev	6	7^{7}	7

Second round
14	(Serbia) N Djokovic	4	6	6	6
(France) G Monfils	6	3	1	3
WC	(United States) T Smyczek	4	2	6^{2}
21	(Spain) A Ramos Viñolas	6	6	7^{7}
(South Korea) H Chung	7^{7}	6	6
(Russia) D Medvedev	6^{4}	1	1
(Germany) P Gojowczyk	1	3	6	3
4	(Germany) A Zverev	6	6	4	6

Third round
14	(Serbia) N Djokovic	6	6	6
21	(Spain) A Ramos Viñolas	2	3	3
(South Korea) H Chung	5	7^{7}	2	6	6
4	(Germany) A Zverev	7	6^{3}	6	3	0

Fourth round
14	(Serbia) N Djokovic	6^{4}	5	6^{3}
(South Korea) H Chung	7^{7}	7	7^{7}

==== Section 7 ====
First round
7	(Belgium) D Goffin	6^{3}	6	6	6
Q	(Germany) M Bachinger	7^{7}	3	2	4
(France) J Benneteau	6^{6}	7^{7}	6	6
(Japan) T Daniel	7^{8}	6^{0}	4	1
(Russia) E Donskoy	6	6	6
(Germany) F Mayer	4	4	4
(Argentina) H Zeballos	4	4	5
25	(Italy) F Fognini	6	6	7
19	(Czech Republic) T Berdych	6	3	6	6
WC	(Australia) A de Minaur	3	6	0	1
(Spain) G García López	6	6^{4}	6	6
(France) B Paire	0	7^{7}	1	4
(Russia) K Khachanov	7^{7}	7^{7}	6
LL	(Canada) P Polansky	6^{3}	6^{2}	4
(United States) F Tiafoe	3	4	3
12	(Argentina) JM del Potro	6	6	6

Second round
7	(Belgium) D Goffin	6	6^{5}	1	6^{4}
(France) J Benneteau	1	7^{7}	6	7^{7}
(Russia) E Donskoy	6	3	4	1
25	(Italy) F Fognini	2	6	6	6
19	(Czech Republic) T Berdych	6	2	6	6
(Spain) G García López	3	6	2	3
(Russia) K Khachanov	4	6^{4}	7^{7}	4
12	(Argentina) JM del Potro	6	7^{7}	6^{0}	6

Third round
(France) J Benneteau	6	2	1	6	3
25	(Italy) F Fognini	3	6	6	4	6
19	(Czech Republic) T Berdych	6	6	6
12	(Argentina) JM del Potro	3	3	2

Fourth round
25	(Italy) F Fognini	1	4	4
19	(Czech Republic) T Berdych	6	6	6

==== Section 8 ====
First round
13	(United States) S Querrey	6	6	6
(Spain) F López	3	4	2
(Moldova) R Albot	2	3	6	5
(Hungary) M Fucsovics	6	6	4	7
(Argentina) N Kicker	6	6	4	3	6
(Australia) J Thompson	3	1	6	6	3
(Slovakia) L Lacko	6^{5}	7	6	7^{7}
22	(Canada) M Raonic	7^{7}	5	4	6^{4}
29	(France) R Gasquet	6	6	7
(Slovenia) B Kavčič	1	4	5
Q	(Italy) L Sonego	6	7	6^{6}	7
(Netherlands) R Haase	3	5	7^{8}	5
WC	(South Korea) S-w Kwon	1	2	4
(Germany) J-L Struff	6	6	6
(Slovenia) A Bedene	3	4	3
2	(Switzerland) R Federer	6	6	6

Second round
13	(United States) S Querrey	4	6^{6}	6	2
(Hungary) M Fucsovics	6	7^{8}	4	6
(Argentina) N Kicker	6	7	1	7
(Slovakia) L Lacko	2	5	6	5
29	(France) R Gasquet	6	6	6
Q	(Italy) L Sonego	2	2	3
(Germany) J-L Struff	4	4	6^{4}
2	(Switzerland) R Federer	6	6	7^{7}

Third round
(Hungary) M Fucsovics	6	6	6
(Argentina) N Kicker	3	3	2
29	(France) R Gasquet	2	5	4
2	(Switzerland) R Federer	6	7	6

Fourth round
(Hungary) M Fucsovics	4	6^{3}	2
2	(Switzerland) R Federer	6	7^{7}	6

== Other entry information ==
=== Qualifying ===
Preceded by 2017 US Open – Men's singles	Grand Slam men's singles	Succeeded by 2018 French Open – Men's singles
