= 2018 Australian Open – Wheelchair quad doubles =

Wheelchair quad doubles
- 2018 Australian Open

Final
- Champions: (Australia) Dylan Alcott (Australia) Heath Davidson
- Runners-up: (United Kingdom) Andrew Lapthorne (United States) David Wagner
- Score: 6–0, 6–7^{(5–7)}, [10–6]

Events
| Singles | men | women | | boys | girls |
| Doubles | men | women | mixed | boys | girls |
| WC Singles | men | women | quad |
| WC Doubles | men | women | quad |
| Legends | men | women | mixed |
- Australian Open

Dylan Alcott and Heath Davidson defeated the defending champions Andrew Lapthorne and David Wagner in the final, 6–0, 6–7^{(5–7)}, [10–6] to win the quad doubles wheelchair tennis title at the 2018 Australian Open.

== Seeds ==
1. (United Kingdom) Andrew Lapthorne / (United States) David Wagner (final)
2. (Australia) Dylan Alcott / (Australia) Heath Davidson (champions)

== Draw ==
Key

- Q = Qualifier
- WC = Wild card
- LL = Lucky loser
- Alt = Alternate
- ITF = ITF entry
- PR = Protected ranking
- SR = Special ranking
- SE = Special exempt
- JE = Junior exempt
- JR = Junior Accelerator Programme entrant
- CO = College Accelerator Programme entrant
- NG = Next Gen Accelerator Program entrant
- w/o = Walkover
- r = Retired
- d = Defaulted

| Final |
| 1 | (United Kingdom) Andrew Lapthorne (United States) David Wagner | 0 | 7^{7} | [6] |
| 2 | (Australia) Dylan Alcott (Australia) Heath Davidson | 6 | 6^{5} | [10] |
