= Mariam Dalakishvili =

Georgian tennis player (born 2001)

Mariam Dalakishvili მარიამ დალაქიშვილი
- Country (sports): Georgia
- Born: 7 November 2001 (age 23) Tbilisi, Georgia
- Plays: Right-handed (two-handed backhand)
- Prize money: US$ 14,953

Singles
- Career record: 33–29
- Career titles: 0
- Highest ranking: No. 771 (13 September 2021)
- Current ranking: No. 805 (3 February 2020)

Grand Slam singles results
- Australian Open Junior: 2R (2018)
- French Open Junior: 2R (2018)
- Wimbledon Junior: 1R (2018)
- US Open Junior: 1R (2018)

Doubles
- Career record: 11–18
- Career titles: 0
- Highest ranking: No. 741 (20 September 2021)
- Current ranking: No. 856 (3 February 2020)

Grand Slam doubles results
- Australian Open Junior: 1R (2018)
- French Open Junior: 1R (2018)
- Wimbledon Junior: 1R (2018)
- US Open Junior: 1R (2018)

Team competitions
- Fed Cup: 1–0
- Last updated on: 4 February 2020.

Mariam Dalakishvili (Georgian: მარიამ დალაქიშვილი; born 7 November 2001) is a Georgian tennis player.

Dalakishvili has a career high WTA singles ranking of 791, achieved on 14 October 2019. She also has a career high WTA doubles ranking of 849, achieved on 14 October 2019.

Dalakishvili represents Georgia in the Fed Cup.
