= Abigail Tere-Apisah =

Papua New Guinean tennis player

- Full name: Abigail Agivanagi Tere-Apisah
- Country (sports): Papua New Guinea; Pacific Oceania (Fed Cup tournaments)
- Born: 13 July 1992 (age 33) Port Moresby, Papua New Guinea
- Plays: Right-handed (two-handed backhand)
- Prize money: $55,261

Singles
- Career record: 111–68
- Career titles: 1 ITF
- Highest ranking: No. 276 (6 August 2018)

Doubles
- Career record: 61–51
- Career titles: 6 ITF
- Highest ranking: No. 224 (11 June 2018)

Team competitions
- Fed Cup: 16–12
Medal record
Representing Papua New Guinea
Women's tennis
Pacific Games
Gold medal – first place	2011 Nouméa	Doubles
Gold medal – first place	2015 Port Moresby	Singles
Gold medal – first place	2015 Port Moresby	Doubles
Gold medal – first place	2015 Port Moresby	Mixed doubles
Gold medal – first place	2015 Port Moresby	Team
Gold medal – first place	2019 Apia	Singles
Gold medal – first place	2019 Apia	Doubles
Gold medal – first place	2019 Apia	Team
Gold medal – first place	2023 Honiara	Singles
Gold medal – first place	2023 Honiara	Mixed doubles
Silver medal – second place	2007 Apia	Doubles
Silver medal – second place	2011 Nouméa	Team
Silver medal – second place	2019 Apia	Mixed doubles
Bronze medal – third place	2007 Apia	Singles
Bronze medal – third place	2011 Nouméa	Singles
Bronze medal – third place	2023 Honiara	Team
Pacific Mini Games
Gold medal – first place	2022 Saipan	Team
Silver medal – second place	2022 Saipan	Singles

Abigail Agivanagi Tere-Apisah (born 13 July 1992) is a former professional tennis player from Papua New Guinea.

Tere-Apisah has a career-high WTA singles ranking of No. 276, achieved on 6 August 2018. She is the daughter of Kwalam Apisah and Verenagi Tere. Her sister Marcia, and her nieces, Violet and Patricia Apisah, are also tennis players.

== Tennis career ==
In 2010, Abigail graduated from Albury High School in Albury, Australia. She then attended Georgia State University, playing tennis for the Panthers, and graduated in 2014 with a BS in Health and Physical Education. Apisah is a two time All-American tennis player (2012 and 2014).

On 24 May 2014, she reached the semifinals of the NCAA Championship, losing in the third-set tiebreak to Lynn Chi. She reached a collegiate national ranking of No. 8 in singles.

On 3 December 2017, in the Asia-Pacific Wildcard Playoff final for the 2018 Australian Open, she was looking to become the first player from Papua New Guinea to compete in a Grand Slam main draw, but lost the final match 6–4, 5–7, 4–6 to Wang Xinyu of China.

On 19 May 2019, Tere-Apisah became the first Pacific islander to win a professional tennis singles title beating Russian top seed, Valeria Savinykh, at a $25k event in Singapore.

== ITF Circuit finals ==
=== Singles: 2 (1 title, 1 runner–up) ===
Legend $25,000 tournaments	Finals by surface Hard (1–1)

Result	W–L	Date	Tournament	Tier	Surface	Opponent	Score
Loss	0–1	Oct 2017	ITF Cairns, Australia	25,000	Hard	(Australia) Olivia Rogowska	6–1, 2–6, 2–6
Win	1–1	May 2019	ITF Singapore	25,000	Hard	(Russia) Valeria Savinykh	6–3, 6–2

=== Doubles: 11 (6 titles, 5 runner–ups) ===
Legend $60,000 tournaments (0–1) $25,000 tournaments (6–4) $15,000 tournaments (0–0)	Finals by surface Hard (5–4) Clay (1–0) Carpet (0–1)

Result	W–L	Date	Tournament	Tier	Surface	Partner	Opponents	Score
Win	1–0	Sep 2016	ITF Brisbane, Australia	25,000	Hard	(Australia) Naiktha Bains	(Israel) Julia Glushko (China) Liu Fangzhou	6–7^{(4)}, 6–2, [10–3]
Win	2–0	Jun 2017	ITF Bethany Beach, United States	25,000	Clay	(United States) Sabrina Santamaria	(United States) Sophie Chang (United States) Alexandra Mueller	6–4, 6–0
Win	3–0	Sep 2017	ITF Penrith, Australia	25,000	Hard	(Australia) Naiktha Bains	(Australia) Tammi Patterson (Australia) Olivia Rogowska	6–0, 7–5
Win	4–0	Sep 2017	ITF Brisbane, Australia (2)	25,000	Hard	(Australia) Naiktha Bains	(United States) Jennifer Elie (Japan) Erika Sema	6–4, 6–1
Loss	4–1	Oct 2017	ITF Toowoomba, Australia	25,000	Hard	(Australia) Naiktha Bains	(Japan) Momoko Kobori (Japan) Ayano Shimizu	5–7, 5–7
Win	5–1	Oct 2017	ITF Cairns, Australia	25,000	Hard	(Australia) Naiktha Bains	(Australia) Astra Sharma (Australia) Belinda Woolcock	4–6, 6–2, [10–6]
Loss	5–2	May 2018	Kurume Cup, Japan	60,000	Carpet	(United Kingdom) Katy Dunne	(United Kingdom) Naomi Broady (United States) Asia Muhammad	2–6, 4–6
Loss	5–3	May 2019	ITF Singapore	25,000	Hard	(India) Rutuja Bhosale	(Indonesia) Beatrice Gumulya (Indonesia) Jessy Rompies	4–6, 6–0, [6–10]
Win	6–3	Jun 2019	ITF Hong Kong	25,000	Hard	(Japan) Junri Namigata	(Japan) Erina Hayashi (Japan) Momoko Kobori	6–3, 2–6, [10–6]
Loss	6–4	Feb 2020	Launceston International, Australia	25,000	Hard	(Australia) Alicia Smith	(Australia) Alison Bai (Australia) Jaimee Fourlis	6–7^{(4)}, 3–6
Loss	6–5	Feb 2020	ITF Perth, Australia	25,000	Hard	(New Zealand) Paige Hourigan	(Japan) Kanako Morisaki (Japan) Erika Sema	1–6, 6–4, [7–10]

== National representation ==
=== Fed Cup ===
Tere-Apisah made her Fed Cup debut for Pacific Oceania in 2015, while the team was competing in the Asia/Oceania Zone Group II.

Group membership World Group World Group Play-off World Group II (0–0) World Group II Play-off Asia/Oceania Group (15–10)	Matches by surface Hard (15–10) Clay (0–0) Grass (0–0) Carpet (0–0)	Matches by type Singles (10–5) Doubles (5–5)	Matches by setting Indoors (3–7) Outdoors (12–3)

==== Singles (10–5) ====
Edition	Stage	Date	Location	Against	Surface	Opponent	W/L	Score
2015 Fed Cup; Asia/Oceania Zone Group II	Pool D	14 April 2015	Hyderabad, India	Indonesia	Hard (i)	Lavinia Tananta	L	6–2, 1–6, 3–6
2015 Fed Cup; Asia/Oceania Zone Group II	Pool D	15 April 2015	Hyderabad, India	Sri Lanka	Hard (i)	Medhira Samarasinghe	W	6–0, 6–3
2015 Fed Cup; Asia/Oceania Zone Group II	5th-8th Play-off	17 April 2015	Hyderabad, India	Singapore	Hard (i)	Angeline Devanthiran	W	6–0, 6–3
2016 Fed Cup; Asia/Oceania Zone Group II	Pool A	11 April 2016	Hua Hin, Thailand	Hong Kong	Hard	Maggie Ng	W	2–6, 6–1, 7–5
2016 Fed Cup; Asia/Oceania Zone Group II	Pool A	12 April 2016	Hua Hin, Thailand	Iran	Hard	Sadaf Sadeghvaziri	W	6–1, 6–1
2016 Fed Cup; Asia/Oceania Zone Group II	Pool A	13 April 2016	Hua Hin, Thailand	Philippines	Hard	Anna Clarice Patrimonio	W	6–1, 6–0
2017 Fed Cup; Asia/Oceania Zone Group II	Pool B	18 July 2017	Dushanbe, Tajikistan	Iran	Hard	Sara Amiri	W	6–3, 6–0
2017 Fed Cup; Asia/Oceania Zone Group II	Pool B	19 July 2017	Dushanbe, Tajikistan	Hong Kong	Hard	Zhang Ling	L	4–6, 4–6
2017 Fed Cup; Asia/Oceania Zone Group II	5th-8th Play-off	21 July 2017	Dushanbe, Tajikistan	Singapore	Hard	Y-kit Nicole Tan	W	6–7^{(5–7)}, 6–0, 6–0
2018 Fed Cup; Asia/Oceania Zone Group II	Pool C	7 February 2018	Isa Town, Bahrain	Oman	Hard	Fatma Al-Nabhani	W	7–6^{(7–4)}, 7–5
2018 Fed Cup; Asia/Oceania Zone Group II	Pool C	8 February 2018	Isa Town, Bahrain	Malaysia	Hard	Suhana Sofia Mohd Adam Das	W	6–2, 6–0
2018 Fed Cup; Asia/Oceania Zone Group II	Promotional Play-off	10 February 2018	Isa Town, Bahrain	Singapore	Hard	Stefanie Tan	W	2–6, 6–2, 6–4
2019 Fed Cup; Asia/Oceania Zone Group I	Pool B	6 February 2019	Astana, Kazakhstan	China	Hard (i)	Zhang Shuai	L	1–6, 2–6
2019 Fed Cup; Asia/Oceania Zone Group I	Pool B	7 February 2019	Astana, Kazakhstan	Indonesia	Hard (i)	Beatrice Gumulya	L	4–6, 6–2, 4–6
2019 Fed Cup; Asia/Oceania Zone Group I	Pool B	8 February 2019	Astana, Kazakhstan	South Korea	Hard (i)	Han Na-lae	L	1–6, 7–5, 3–6

==== Doubles (5–5) ====
Edition	Stage	Date	Location	Against	Surface	Partner	Opponents	W/L	Score
2015 Fed Cup; Asia/Oceania Zone Group II	Pool D	14 April 2015	Hyderabad, India	Indonesia	Hard (i)	(Cook Islands) Brittany Teei	Ayu Fani Damayanti; Lavinia Tananta	L	0–6, 2–6
2015 Fed Cup; Asia/Oceania Zone Group II	5th-8th Play-off	17 April 2015	Hyderabad, India	Singapore	Hard (i)	(Cook Islands) Brittany Teei	Wi Joanne Koh; Sarah Pang	W	6–0, 6–3
2016 Fed Cup; Asia/Oceania Zone Group II	Pool A	11 April 2016	Hua Hin, Thailand	Hong Kong	Hard	(Samoa) Steffi Carruthers	Sher Chun-wing; Zhang Ling	L	3–6, 2–6
2016 Fed Cup; Asia/Oceania Zone Group II	Pool A	13 April 2016	Hua Hin, Thailand	Philippines	Hard	(Samoa) Steffi Carruthers	Khim Iglupas; Katharina Lehnert	L	4–6, 3–6
2018 Fed Cup; Asia/Oceania Zone Group II	Pool C	6 February 2018	Isa Town, Bahrain	Iran	Hard	(Samoa) Steffi Carruthers	Shahrzad Banisaeid; Kimia Rahmani	W	6–0, 6–0
2018 Fed Cup; Asia/Oceania Zone Group II	Pool C	7 February 2018	Isa Town, Bahrain	Oman	Hard	(Samoa) Steffi Carruthers	Maryam Al Balushi; Aisha Al Suleimani	W	6–0, 6–1
2018 Fed Cup; Asia/Oceania Zone Group II	Pool C	8 February 2018	Isa Town, Bahrain	Malaysia	Hard	(Samoa) Steffi Carruthers	Jawairiah Noordin; Suhana Sofia Mohd Adam Das	W	6–4, 6–2
2018 Fed Cup; Asia/Oceania Zone Group II	Promotional Play-off	10 February 2018	Isa Town, Bahrain	Singapore	Hard	(Samoa) Steffi Carruthers	Charmaine Shi Yi Seah; Stefanie Tan	W	6–1, 6–1
2019 Fed Cup; Asia/Oceania Zone Group I	Pool B	6 February 2019	Astana, Kazakhstan	China	Hard (i)	(Samoa) Steffi Carruthers	Xu Yifan; Zheng Saisai	L	6–3, 3–6, 4–6
2019 Fed Cup; Asia/Oceania Zone Group I	Pool B	7 February 2019	Astana, Kazakhstan	Indonesia	Hard (i)	(Samoa) Steffi Carruthers	Deria Nur Haliza; Jessy Rompies	L	4–6, 4–6
