= Tennis at the Pacific Games =

Tennis at the Pacific Games has been contested since 1963 when it was included as one of ten sports at the First South Pacific Games held in Suva, Fiji.

Tennis has also been played at many of the Pacific Mini Games, starting with the first edition held at Honiara in 1981.

== Pacific Games ==
Flag icons and three letter country code indicate the nationality of the gold medal winner of an event, where this information is known; otherwise an (X) is used. Moving the cursor onto a country code with a dotted underline will reveal the name of the gold medal winner. A dash (–) indicates an event that was not contested.

Games	Year	Host city	Men's			Mixed Doubles (or Team)	Women's			Total events	Refs
Games	Year	Host city	Singles	Doubles	Team	Mixed Doubles (or Team)	Team	Doubles	Singles	Total events	Refs
I	1963	Suva	–	–	–	FIJ	–	–	–	1	(Note: In 1963, tennis and table tennis were contested as mixed team sports on a knock-out basis, with one medal set awarded in each sport.)
II	1966	Nouméa	–	–	NCL	NCL	NCL	–	–	3	(Note: New Caledonia's tennis team made a clean sweep of the men's, women's and mixed events in Noumea.)
III	1969	Port Moresby	–	–	NCL	NCL	PNG	–	–	3	(Note: There were three team events in 1969, men's women's and mixed. Joan Ainsworth won gold medals for PNG in the women's events.)
IV	1971	Papeete	NCL	NCL	NCL	NCL	NCL	NCL	NCL	7	
V	1975	Tumon	NCL	PNG	–	TAH	–	NCL	TAH	5	(Note: The matches of opportunity men's and women's teams events were cancelled due to rain, as were the bronze medal playoffs in the men's doubles (Fiji vs. French Polynesia) and mixed doubles (PNG vs. Guam – in this case both were awarded bronze).)
VI	1979	Suva	TAH	NCL	TAH	TAH	TAH	TAH	TAH	7	(Note: Tahiti won six of the seven events, missing only the men's doubles which was won by New Caledonia.)
VII	1983	Apia	X	X	NCL	X	TAH	X	X	7	
VIII	1987	Nouméa	X	X	X	X	X	X	X	7	
IX	1991	Port Moresby	X	X	X	X	X	X	X	7	
X	1995	Papeete	X	X	X	X	X	X	X	7	
XI	1999	Santa Rita	NCL	NCL	NCL	NCL	SAM	SAM	SAM	7	
XII	2003	Suva	NCL	NCL	NCL	SAM	SAM	SAM	NCL	7	(Note: New Caledonia won all men's events, and the women's singles. Samoa won the other events.)
XIII	2007	Apia	SOL	NCL	NCL	NCL	SAM	SAM	NCL	7	
XIV	2011	Nouméa	NCL	SAM	NCL	NCL	NCL	PNG	NCL	7	(Note: New Caledonia won the singles, team's and mixed doubles events, while Samoa and PNG won the men's and women's doubles respectively.)
XV	2015	Port Moresby	NCL	NCL	NCL	PNG	PNG	PNG	PNG	7	(Note: Papua New Guinea swept up all of the women's and mixed events, while New Caledonia won all the men's events.)
XVI	2019	Apia	NMI	TON	NMI	NMI	PNG	PNG	PNG	7	(Note: Papua New Guinea swept up all of the women's and mixed events, while Northern Mariana Islands won 2 medals and Tonga won 1 medal.)
XVII	2023	Honiara	Currently ongoing								
XVIII	2027	Pirae	Scheduled for 2027								

== Pacific Mini Games ==
Games	Year	Host city	Men's			Mixed Doubles	Women's			Total events	Refs
Games	Year	Host city	Singles	Doubles	Team	Mixed Doubles	Team	Doubles	Singles	Total events	Refs
I	1981	Honiara	X	X	–	X	–	X	X	5	
II	1985	Rarotonga	X	X	–	X	–	X	X	5	
III	1989	Nuku'alofa	NCL	(French Polynesia); TAH	–	(French Polynesia); TAH	–	(French Polynesia); TAH	GUM	5	
IV	1993	Port Vila	X	X	X	X	X	X	X	7	
V	1997	Pago Pago	X	X	X	X	X	X	X	7	
VI	2001	Kingston	X	X	X	X	X	X	X	7	
VII	Tennis not contested										
VIII	2009	Rarotonga	NCL	NCL	NCL	NCL	NCL	COK	COK	7	(Note: In 2009, New Caledonia dominated the tennis tournament, taking five gold medals. Host nation the Cook Islands won the other two gold medals on offer; the women's singles and doubles events.)
IX	Tennis not contested										
X	2017	Port Vila	NCL	VAN	VAN	NCL	NCL	SAM	SAM	7	(Note: Host nation Vanuatu won two of the three men's events, Samoa won two of the three women's events, and New Caledonia took one of each plus the mixed doubles.)
XI	2022	Saipan	X	X	X	X	X	X	X	7	

== See also ==
- Tennis at the Summer Olympics
