= Annerly Georgopoulos =

Australian tennis player

- Country (sports): Australia; Samoa
- Born: 8 January 2003 (age 22) Canberra, Australia
- Plays: Right-handed (two-handed backhand)
- Prize money: $1,753

Singles
- Career record: 5–5
- Career titles: 0

Grand Slam singles results
- Australian Open Junior: 2R (2019)
- French Open Junior: 3R (2019)
- US Open Junior: 1R (2019)

Doubles
- Career record: 2–3
- Career titles: 0

Grand Slam doubles results
- Australian Open Junior: 1R (2017, 2018, 2019)
- French Open Junior: 1R (2019)
- Last updated on: 8 January 2019.

Annerly Georgopoulos (also known as Annerly Poulos; born 8 January 2003) is an Australian junior tennis player.

Georgopoulos has a career high ITF combined junior ranking of 64, achieved on 7 January 2019.

She made her WTA main draw debut at the 2019 Hobart International in the doubles event, partnering compatriot Alison Bai.

Georgopoulos is multiracial, being the daughter of a Greek father and a Samoan mother.
