= American Memorial Park =

National memorial located in the Northern Mariana Islands

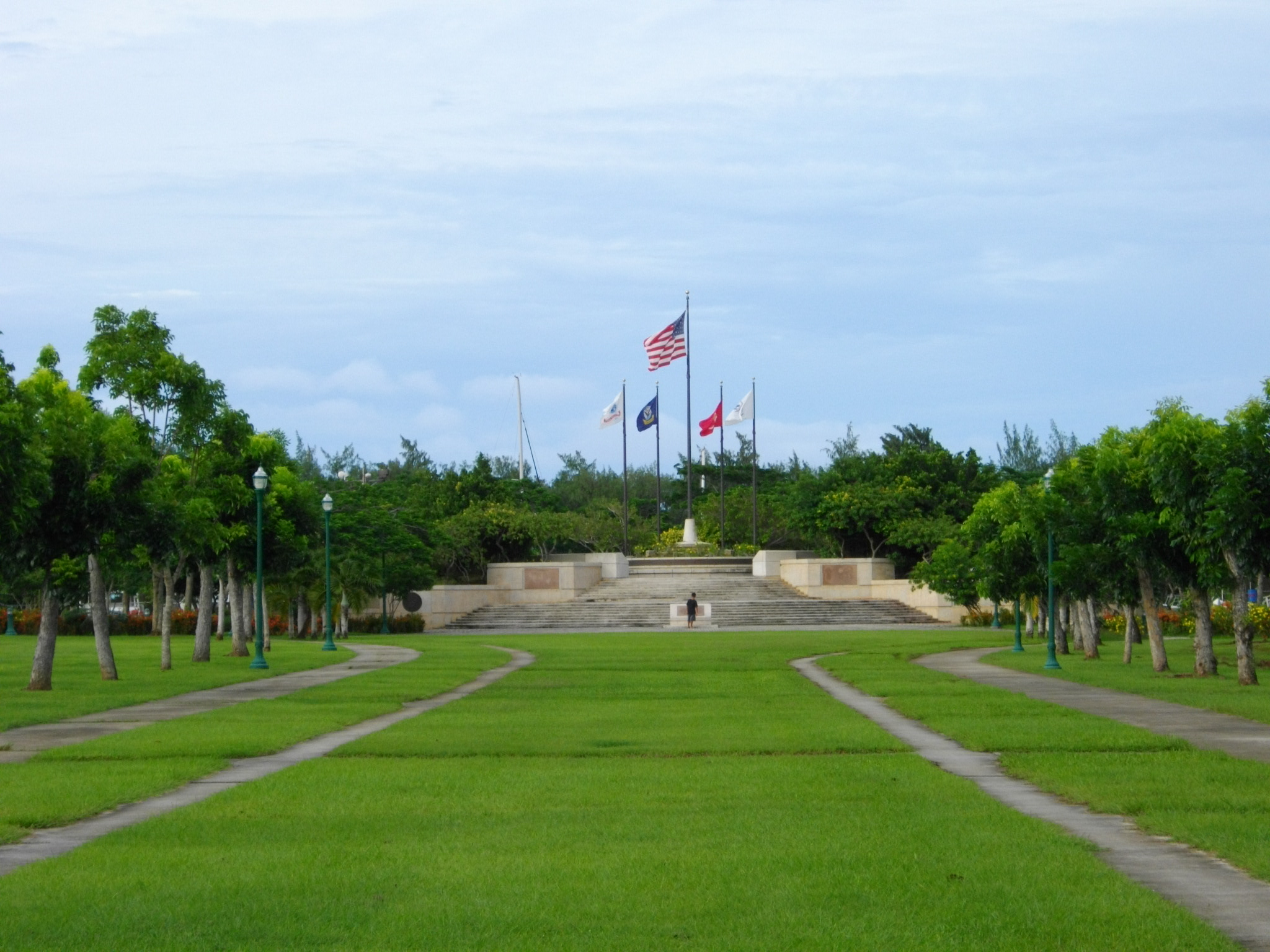
- American Memorial Park, 2010

- Location within Northern Mariana Islands
- Location: Northern Mariana Islands, US
- Nearest city: Garapan, Saipan
- Coordinates: 15°12′59″N 145°42′52″E
- Area: 133 acres (54 ha)
- Established: August 18, 1978
- Governing body: Commonwealth of the Northern Mariana Islands
- Website: American Memorial Park

American Memorial Park on the island of Saipan, Northern Mariana Islands, United States, was created as a memorial honoring the sacrifices made during the Marianas Campaign of World War II. Recreational facilities, a World War II museum and flag monument keep alive the memory of over 4,000 United States military personnel and local islanders who died in June 1944.

The park is owned by the Government of the Commonwealth of the Northern Mariana Islands, and the national memorial is managed in cooperation with the National Park Service as an affiliated area. It has facilities for baseball, bicycling, running, tennis, picnicking, and swimming.

== See also ==
- List of national memorials of the United States
