= Violet Apisah =

Australian-Papuan tennis player (born 2000)

- Country (sports): Papua New Guinea (2016–current); Australia (2014–16); Pacific Oceania (Fed Cup tournaments)
- Residence: Sydney, Australia
- Born: 11 February 2000 (age 26) Port Moresby, Papua New Guinea
- Plays: Right-handed (two-handed backhand)
- Prize money: $0

Singles
- Career record: 0–1
- Career titles: 0

Grand Slam singles results
- Australian Open Junior: 3R (2016)
- Wimbledon Junior: 1R (2017, 2018)
- US Open Junior: 3R (2018)

Doubles
- Career record: 0–0
- Career titles: 0

Grand Slam doubles results
- Australian Open Junior: F (2018)
- Wimbledon Junior: QF (2017)
- US Open Junior: 1R (2018)

Team competitions
- Fed Cup: 0–1
Medal record
Representing Papua New Guinea
Women's Tennis
Pacific Games
Gold medal – first place	2015 Port Moresby	Team
Gold medal – first place	2019 Apia	Doubles
Gold medal – first place	2019 Apia	Team
Silver medal – second place	2015 Port Moresby	Doubles
Silver medal – second place	2015 Port Moresby	Mixed Doubles
Silver medal – second place	2019 Apia	Singles
- Last updated on: 6 February 2019.

Violet Apisah (born 11 February 2000) is an Australian-Papuan tennis player.

== Career ==
In 2016, Apisah won the WTA Future Stars Under-16 Tournament, which was an exhibition tournament in Singapore during the 2016 WTA Finals.

On the junior tour, Apisah has a career high ITF junior combined ranking of 24, achieved on 26 March 2018.

In 2018, Apisah reached the final of the 2018 Australian Open girls' doubles event, partnering Lulu Sun.

In 2019, Apisah made her Fed Cup debut for Pacific Oceania.

== Personal life ==
Apisah is the niece of Abigail and Marcia Tere-Apisah, who are also tennis players. Her sister, Patricia, is also a junior tennis player.

== ITF Circuit finals ==
=== Singles: 2 (runner-ups) ===
Legend W15 tournaments (0–2)	Finals by surface Hard (0–2)

Result	W–L	Date	Tournament	Tier	Surface	Opponent	Score
Loss	0–1	Oct 2026	ITF Singapore	W15	Hard (i)	Alexandra Malova	7–5^{(3)}, 4–6, 4–6
Loss	0–2	Oct 2026	ITF Singapore	W15	Hard (i)	(Thailand) Thasaporn Naklo	2–6, 2–6

== Junior Grand Slam finals ==
=== Doubles ===
Result	Year	Tournament	Surface	Partner	Opponent	Score
Runner-up	2018	Australian Open	Hard	(Switzerland) Lulu Sun	(Chinese Taipei) Liang En-shuo (China) Wang Xinyu	6–7^{(4–7)}, 6–4, [5–10]

== ITF junior finals ==
Grand Slam
Category GA
Category G1
Category G2
Category G3
Category G4
Category G5

=== Singles (10–2) ===
Outcome	No.	Date	Tournament	Grade	Surface	Opponent	Score
Winner	1.	27 April 2014	Melbourne, Australia	G4	Clay	(Australia) Jaimee Fourlis	6–1, 6–3
Runner-up	1.	26 July 2014	Kawana, Australia	G4	Hard	(Australia) Sara Tomic	6–0, 3–6, 6–7^{(7–9)}
Winner	2.	19 October 2014	Gosford, Australia	G5	Hard	(Australia) Baijing Lin	6–3, 7–6^{(8–6)}
Runner-up	2.	8 August 2015	Lautoka, Fiji	B2	Hard	(Australia) Jaimee Fourlis	1–6, 0–6
Winner	3.	4 October 2015	Auckland, New Zealand	G4	Hard (i)	(Australia) Michaela Haet	6–4, 6–0
Winner	4.	11 October 2015	Canberra, Australia	G5	Hard	(Australia) Kaitlin Staines	6–2, 6–3
Winner	5.	17 July 2016	Caloundra, Australia	G4	Hard	(Australia) Kaitlin Staines	6–1, 7–5
Winner	6.	24 July 2016	Gold Coast, Australia	G4	Hard	(Australia) Kaitlin Staines	6–4, 6–3
Winner	7.	12 August 2016	Lautoka, Fiji	B2	Hard	(Australia) Kaitlin Staines	6–7^{(4–7)}, 6–4, 6–4
Winner	8.	25 June 2017	Lautoka, Fiji	G4	Hard	(Northern Mariana Islands) Carol Young Suh Lee	6–0, 6–4
Winner	9.	11 August 2017	Lautoka, Fiji	B2	Hard	(Australia) Megan Smith	6–3, 6–1
Winner	10.	21 October 2017	Nonthaburi, Thailand	G2	Hard	(Canada) Natasha Sengphrachanh	6–4, 6–3

=== Doubles (12–4) ===
Outcome	No.	Date	Tournament	Grade	Surface	Partner	Opponents	Score
Runner-up	1.	12 October 2014	Gosford, Australia	G5	Hard	(Australia) Ella Husrefovic	(Australia) Baijing Lin (Australia) Gabriela Ruffels	3–6, 0–6
Runner-up	2.	4 October 2015	Auckland, New Zealand	G4	Hard (i)	(New Zealand) Rosie Cheng	(New Zealand) Stella Cliffe (New Zealand) Ashleigh Harvey	5–7, 3–6
Runner-up	3.	11 October 2015	Canberra, Australia	G5	Hard	(Australia) Maria Vais	(Australia) Imogen Clews (Australia) Kaitlin Staines	4–6, 4–6
Runner-up	4.	22 April 2016	Melbourne, Australia	G4	Hard	(Australia) Gabriela Sprague	(Australia) Gabriella Da Silva-Fick (Australia) Selina Turulja	2–6, 5–7
Winner	1.	24 July 2016	Gold Coast, Australia	G4	Hard	(Australia) Patricia Apisah	(Australia) Lisa Mays (Australia) Kaitlin Staines	6–1, 6–1
Winner	2.	12 August 2016	Lautoka, Fiji	B2	Hard	(Australia) Petra Hule	(Australia) Kaitlin Staines (Australia) Jessica Zaviacic	6–2, 6–2
Winner	3.	30 October 2016	Incheon, South Korea	G2	Hard	(Chinese Taipei) Lee Yang	(Chinese Taipei) Cho I-hsuan (China) Du Zhima	7–6^{(7–5)}, 7–6^{(7–5)}
Winner	4.	25 June 2017	Lautoka, Fiji	G4	Hard	(Papua New Guinea) Patricia Apisah	(Northern Mariana Islands) Carol Young Suh Lee (Singapore) Maxine Ng	6–0, 7–6^{(7–3)}
Runner-up	5.	11 August 2017	Lautoka, Fiji	B2	Hard	(Papua New Guinea) Patricia Apisah	(New Zealand) Valentina Ivanov (Australia) Amber Marshall	2–6, 6–1, [4–10]
Winner	5.	21 October 2017	Nonthaburi, Thailand	G2	Hard	(Japan) Rina Saigo	(Thailand) Mananchaya Sawangkaew (China) Wang Jiaqi	2–6, 6–1, [10–7]
Winner	6.	4 November 2017	Tin Hau, Hong Kong	G2	Hard	(Switzerland) Lulu Sun	(Chinese Taipei) Lee Kuan-yi (Thailand) Mananchaya Sawangkaew	6–1, 6–1
Runner-up	6.	27 January 2018	Australian Open, Melbourne	GS	Hard	(Switzerland) Lulu Sun	(Chinese Taipei) Liang En-shuo (China) Wang Xinyu	6–7^{(4–7)}, 6–4, [5–10]
Runner-up	7.	10 March 2018	Nonthaburi, Thailand	G1	Hard	(Switzerland) Lulu Sun	(China) Guo Meiqi (Hong Kong) Cody Wong	4–6, 6–0, [8–10]
