= Ruby Coffin =

Fijian tennis player (born 2000)

- Country (sports): Fiji
- Born: 12 April 2000 (age 26) Lautoka, Fiji
- Plays: Junior tennis

Ruby Coffin (born 12 April 2000) is a Fijian tennis player. She represented Fiji at the 2017 Asian Indoor and Martial Arts Games (which was also the first instance where Fiji went onto compete in an Asian event) and competed in the Indoor tennis event. She was seeded 9th in the jr. Women's singles and in the jr. Women's doubles, and finished in 5th place in the Indoor tennis tournament. She is currently playing in junior level tennis competitions. In doubles she is partnered with Vienna Kumar, a fellow Fijian jr. tennis player.

Ruby Coffin studied at the Natabua High School, and had an itf ranking of 1965 in the world
